= Christian Gueintz =

17th-century German teacher and writer

Christian Gueintz (Christian Gueintzius)
- Born: 13 October 1592; Kohlo (Guben), Saxony (HRE)
- Died: 3 April 1650 (aged 57); Halle, Archbishopric of Magdeburg (HRE)
- Occupations: Educator and education reformer
- Spouse: Catharina Brand (Note: Some sources spell her name Catharina Bernd, but there was evidently only one of her.)
- Children: Ursula Elisabeth Gueintz and others
- Parent(s): Johannes Gueintzius; Ursula Kretschmar/Gueintzius

Christian Gueintz (13 October 1592 – 3 April 1650) was a teacher and writer-grammarian. He was qualified and taught in several mainstream subjects of the time, notably philosophy, theology, and law.

He lived during the first half of the seventeenth century, a period characterised by Baroque architecture and, in northern Germany, repeatedly disrupted by destructive war, which at various points had a dislocating impact on his career, and through which he demonstrated impressive qualities of persistence.

== Life ==
Guenitz was born in Kohlo near Guben, (Note: Kolo/ Kolau/Kohlo in the Kreis (district) of Guben an der Neiße: today Koto in the Wojewodschaft of Zilona.) roughly 40 kilometres (25 mi) north-east of Cottbus. His father was a protestant pastor. His mother, Ursula, was the daughter of another evangelical pastor, called Daniel Kretschmar. He attended school in Cottbus but had to leave when much of the city was destroyed by fire in 1608. Subsequently his school career took him to Guben, Crossen (1608/09), Sorau (1609–1612), Bautzen (1612) and Stettin (1613). When he was 23, on 23 June 1615 he entered the university at Wittemberg (often identified in contemporary sources as "Leucorea"). Unusually it was just fifteen months later, on 24 September 1616, that he became a "Magister". (Note: One source gives the date on which he was made a "Magister" as 24 November 1616 (and not 24 September 1616).) In 1617 Wittenberg made him a member of the Philosophy faculty and gave him a teaching contract that covered Rhetoric, Logic, Physics, Ethics and Politics.

The noted education reformer Prince Louis I of Anhalt-Köthen was looking for a suitable teacher to lead the school reforms which he was promoting. Christian Gueintz was recommended to The Prince, probably by the fashionably radical educationalist Wolfgang Ratke and/or possibly by Jakob Martini. Starting on 3 June 1619, Gueintz now found himself the other side of Dessau, in Köthen, teaching Latin and Greek. It was at Köthen that Gueintz also translated Ratke's Grammatica universalis into Greek and compiled a book of language exercises in Greek and German (Griechischer Sprach Ubung printed Köthen 1620).

Still in Köthen, on 14 September 1621 Christian Gueintz married Catharina Brand/Bernd She was a daughter of a former mayor of Köthen who had died in 1616. After this, in 1622, Gueintz returned to Wittemberg and embarked on a period of Law study. As soon as he had completed these studies he was elected a lawyer in the evangelical consistory in Wittenberg.

On 4 April 1627 Gueintz took over from Sigismund Evenius as rector of the important Gymnasium (school) at Halle. During his tenure other noted educationalists at the school would include Gebhard von Alvensleben, David Schirmer and Philipp von Zesen. However, in 1630 he became involved in a high-profile and acrimonious dispute over teaching priorities with Samuel Scheidt, following which the famous composer lost his music directorship in Halle, becoming, for the time being, an unquiet freelance music maestro.

Gueintz was still in Halle in 1631 when the city was overrun by the Swedish army. This ushered in several years of exacerbated hardship. The Swedish king arrived in person early in 1632 to negotiate the city's surrender. Negotiations took place in the house of the Halle council chairman, Karl Herold, whose son would later marry Christian Gueinz's eldest daughter, Ursula Elisabeth. As so often, plague followed the armies and later in 1632 Halle was hit by a serious outbreak. Overall 3,300 people died, and Gueintz's school was left with only a few pupils. Further disaster struck in 1637 when the Swedish troops plundered the city: however, they spared the school.

In 1641 Prince Louis had Guenitz enrolled into the so-called Fruitbearing Society (societas fructifera), an organisation launched in 1617 to promote the standardisation and promotion of vernacular German as a language of literature and scholarship. Gueintz is recorded as the 361st member: the record of his membership also includes the in seventeenth-century German rhyming couplets, which he composed expressing gratitude for his membership.

In the grammar/school books of his later years Gueintz sticks closely to the line of his mentor Wolfgang Ratke. The two had worked closely together on the Köthen school reform programme, with the hands-on approach of Gueintz elegantly complementing Ratke's intellectually formidable, but more theoretically based contributions to the project. Geuintz's conception of language nevertheless stood in opposition to that of the "Analogists" Justus Georg Schottel and Georg Philipp Harsdörffer.

== Principal publications ==
- Gregor Ritzsch, ed. (1640). "Lob der Edlen vnd nützlichen Druckerey-Kunst [Praise of the Noble and Useful Art of Printing]". Jubilaeum typographorum Lipsiensium: Oder Zweyhundert-Jähriges Buchdrucker JubelFest [Jubilaeum typographorum Lipsiensium: Or Two Hundred Years' Jubilee of Book Printers] (in German). Leipzig.
  - Alternate title: Trucker-Lob/ Auff das ander hundertjährige Jubel-Fest/ So gehalten am Johannes-Tage, available at VD 17, 125:002807N.
- Deutscher Sprachlehre Entwurf [German Grammar Draft] (in German) (reprint ed.). Hildesheim: Georg Olms Verlag. 1978 [1641]. ISBN 3-487-06478-2.
- Die Deutsche Rechtschreibung [German Orthography] (in German) (reprint ed.). Hildesheim: Georg Olms Verlag. 2008 [1645]. ISBN 978-3-487-12861-0.
