= August Buchner =

German philologist, poet, literary scholar and professor

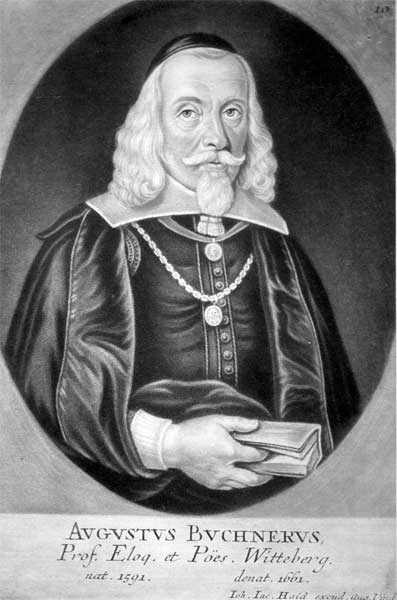
- Buchner, engraving by Johann Jacob Haid
- Born: 2 November 1591; Dresden
- Died: 12 February 1661 (aged 69); Apollensdorf
- Education: Landesschule Pforta; University of Wittenberg
- Occupations: Philologist; Poet; Professor of poetry; Professor of rhetoric; University director

August Buchner (2 November 1591 – 12 February 1661) was a German philologist, poet and literary scholar, an influential professor of poetry and rhetoric at the University of Wittenberg.

== Career ==
Buchner was born in Dresden the son of Paul Buchner and his wife Maria, the daughter of the mayor of Dresden Bastian Kröß. After private education, he attended from 17 November 1604 the Landesschule Pforta, where he received education in religion, classical languages and the liberal arts. He studied at the University of Wittenberg from 19 November 1610, first law and philosophy. He studied poetry with Friedrich Taubmann and Johann Rodenberg, ethics with Balthasar Meisner, Greek with Erasmus Schmidt, and rhetoric with Adam Theodor Siber.

Before he achieved the magister degree, he was appointed professor of poetry in 1616 as the successor of Rodenberg by the court of Saxony. Among his students are Simon Dach, Paul Fleming, Johann Franck, Paul Gerhardt, Christian Gueintz, Christian Keymann, Balthasar Kindermann, Johann Klaj, Martin Opitz, David Schirmer, Andreas Tscherning, Jakob Thomasius, Philipp von Zesen and Caspar Ziegler. After Opitz had died, Buchner was regarded as most influential for German Baroque poetry. He was Rektor of the university in 1618, 1632 and 1654. He died in Apollensdorf.

== Work ==
Buchner's Hauptwerk, Anleitung zur deutschen Poeterei (Instructions for German poetry), was published in Wittenberg in 1665 after his death by his son-in-law Otto Praetorius. It contains his lectures on poetry, compiled from his manuscripts and those of students. He contributed to the Thesaurus Eruditionis Scholasticae, a Latin dictionary first printed in 1571. Buchner wrote the libretto for a ballet-opera Orpheus und Euridice with music by Heinrich Schütz, which was performed on 20 November 1638 for a courtly wedding. The musical score of this work has subsequently been lost.

== Selected works ==
The German National Library holds 17 of his publications. The VD 17 (Bibliography of Books Printed in the German Speaking Countries from 1601 to 1700) lists 216 publications related to him, including collections of dissertations, speeches and letters, including:

- Dissertationum academicarum Wittenberg 1650 (VD 17, 134)
- Oratio panegyrica. Halle 1661
- Epistolae (letters) Dresden 1697 (VD 17, No. 5–7)
- Poemata selectiora, nunc primum edita. Leipzig and Frankfurt am Main 1694. (Latin Poems.)
- Deutsche Gedichte. Editors: Gerd Hergen Lübben and Wulf Segebrecht. Bamberg 2020. (German Poems.)

=== As editor ===
- Plautus: Comoediae Wittenberg 1640 (VD 17, 174–176)
- Gabriel Naudé: Bibliographia politica Wittenberg 1641 (VD 17, 173)
- Pliny the Younger (ed.): Epistolarum libri X Wittenberg 1643 (VD 17, 169)

== Literature ==
- Hans Heinrich Borchardt: August Buchner und seine Bedeutung für die deutsche Literatur des 17. Jahrhunderts. Habilitationsschrift, München 1919
- Wilhelm Buchner: August Buchner, sein Leben und Wirken. Hannover 1863 Online
- Franz Hahne: Paul Gerhardt und Augustus Buchner. In: Euphorion 15 (1908), pp. 19–34
- Martin Keller: Johann Klajs Weihnachtsdichtung. Berlin 1971
- Käte Lorenzen: Augustus Buchner. In: Musik in Geschichte und Gegenwart, 2 (1952), pp. 416–418
- William Jervis Jones: Sprachhelden und Sprachverderber – Dokumente zur Erforschung des Fremdwortpurismus im Deutschen (1478–1750). de Gruyter, 1995, ISBN 3-11-014480-8, pp. 455–462

== Bibliography ==
- Hermann Palm (1876). "Buchner, August" . Allgemeine Deutsche Biographie (in German). Vol. 3. Leipzig: Duncker & Humblot. pp. 485–487.
- Publications by or about August Buchner at VD 17
- Hans Heinrich Borcherdt (1955). "Buchner, Augustus". Neue Deutsche Biographie (in German). Vol. 2. Berlin: Duncker & Humblot. pp. 703–704. (full text online).
- Friedrich Wilhelm Bautz (1975). "Buchner, August". In Bautz, Friedrich Wilhelm (ed.). Biographisch-Bibliographisches Kirchenlexikon (BBKL) (in German). Vol. 1. Hamm: Bautz. col. 792. ISBN 3-88309-013-1.
- Gerhard Dünnhaupt: Augustus Buchner (1591–1661). In: Personalbibliographien zu den Drucken des Barock, Bd. 2. Hiersemann, Stuttgart 1990, ISBN 3-7772-9027-0, pp. 855–910.
- "Entry". Zedlers Universallexikon. Vol. 4. p. 900.
- Abraham Calov: Artificii Oratorii Magisterium. Oder Sonderbahre Kunst und Meisterstück der göttlichen Beredsamkeit/ des grossen Oratoris Christi Jesu ... : Bey ... Leich-Begängnüß Des ... Augusti Buchneri, Eloquentiae und Poeseos bey der löblichen Universität Wittenberg berühmten Prof. Publ. ... Welcher im Jahr Christi 1661. seines Alters im 70sten/ am 12. Febr. ... entschlaffen/ Und darauf am 19. selbigen Monats in der Schloß Kirchen in sein Ruch-Bettlein versetzet / In der Pfarr-Kirchen daselbst. Wittenberg 1661 (Online)
- "August Buchner / Publications" (in German). German National Library.
- "August Buchner / Literat August Buchner 1591 – 1661" (in German). Heinrich Schütz Haus.
