= Johann Michael Dilherr =

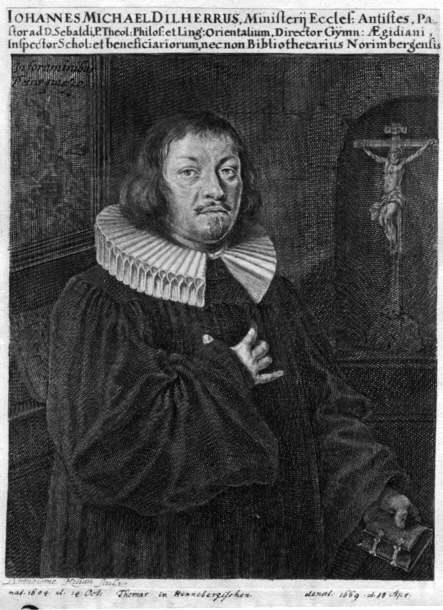
- Born: 14 October 1604; Themar, Henneberg, Germany
- Died: 8 April 1669 (aged 64); Nuremberg, Germany
- Spouse: Anna Maria Schmid (?-1664)
- Parent(s): Johann Dilherr; Regina Götz

Johann Michael Dilherr (14 October 1604 - 8 April 1669) was a German Protestant theologian and philologist at the universities of Jena and Atldorf (Nuremberg).

== Life ==
Johann Michael Dilherr was born at Themar, a small walled market town to the south of Erfurt in the German heartland. Johann Dilherr, his father, was an administrative official. The boy grew up in modest circumstances, but when he was 13 he was able to progress to the Gymnasium (secondary school) at nearby Schleusingen. In 1623 he moved on to university, studying successively at Jena, Leipzig, Wittenberg and Atldorf (Nuremberg). He also supported himself by tutoring the sons of the nobility.

At Jena he was taught by Johann Gerhard, who decisive influenced his ideas, combining Lutheran orthodoxy with the ideas being promulgated by Johann Arndt. Dilherr's early theological writings also disclose powerfully the influence of Johann Matthäus Meyfart, whose eschatological and ascetic vision he in most respects adopted. In 1630, Dilherr received his Magister degree in Theology at Jena, where the next year he was appointed professor for Eloquence (Rhetoric). In 1634, he was appointed professor for History and Literature. In 1640, still at Jena, he was appointed to an extraordinary professorship in Theology.

In 1642 Dilherr accepted an invitation from the Nuremberg City Council ("Rat der Stadt Nürnberg") to become preacher at the church of St. Lorenz. Between 1642 and 1644, he was serving as rector at the newly opened "Aegidianum" Gymnasium (secondary school), also employed as a schools supervisor and working to reform the city schools system. As an education reformer he was, in particular, an adherent of the ideas of Wolfgang Ratke.

Johann Michael Dilherr married Anna Maria Deschauer (born Anna Maria Schmid) from Eger on 29 November 1644. She was a widow and their twenty year marriage was childless. In 1646 he became a preacher at St. Sebaldus Church. It was also around this time that he was appointed Nuremberg's city librarian.

Dilherr became rich. His wife, reportedly, was the widow of a rich merchant. He was able to give substantial sums of money to endow schools at Meiningen, Themar and Schleusingen. Of at least equal lasting value to posterity was his 8,000 volume personal library which, on his death, he bequeathed to the city of Nuremberg, along with his valuable coin collection.

== Personality ==
Dilherr was a man driven by his convictions. He used the new technology to publish his insights and pronouncements, whether profound or trivial. On account of this, at least one source marks him out as a remarkably vain man.

== Importance ==
Both as a leading churchman and as a promoter of the literary arts, Dilherr was one of the key figures in mid-seventeenth century Nuremberg. In theological terms he represented the Irenicist tendency, always more interested in what united Christians than in what divided them. His written work was popular among contemporary readers, and widely quoted and adopted by fellow authors.

Soon after taking office he established the Auditorium Publicum at the "Aegidianum", and he encouraged talented students to give public speeches in it.

He had close ties with the Pegnesischer Blumenorden (literally, if misleadingly, "Pegnitz Flower Society"), the Nuremberg-based literary association. He welcomed the destitute student Johann Klaj into his home and promoted his house guest's poetic output. He was similarly supportive of the orphaned poet Sigmund von Birken. Another poet whom Dilherr admired was Georg Philipp Harsdörffer: when Harsdörffer died in 1658 it was Dilherr who delivered his funeral oration. Eleven years later, when Dilherr himself died, the Blumenorden (association) produced an elaborate eulogy in his honour.

Dilherr's library of 8,000 volumes is today preserved at the Regional Church Archive of the Evangelical Lutheran Church in Nuremberg. His extensive correspondence with various important contemporaries is also represented in this archive by a collection of more than a hundred letters.

== Works ==
As senior preacher at one of the city's main churches, Dilherr had plenty of duties in addition to the church services on Sundays and feast days. Several hundred printed orders of service for funeral services that he led survive. Unusually, almost all of the sermons he wrote and delivered during his Nuremberg years have been published, many in thick bound volumes, and some reappearing in several editions. Many of his published literary works were adorned with verses by well known Nuremberg poets and illustrations by Jacob von Sandrart. Poets who "participated" with Dilherr in this way included Georg Philipp Harsdörffer, Johann Christoph Arnschwanger and, in particular, Sigmund von Birken who contributed well over 500 verses and devotional poems and also designed some emblems for Dilherr's published pieces.

=== Output (selection) ===
- Vitia Linguarum Praecipua, Jena 1640 (digitised in the Digital Library of Mecklenburg-Vorpommern)
- Christliche KarfreitagsBetrachtung, Nürnberg 1642 (digitised in the Digital Library of Mecklenburg-Vorpommern)
- Confessio Augustana, 1643
- Weg zur Seligkeit, Erbauungsbuch, 1646 (13 Auflagen bis 1752)
- Evangelische Schlußreimen, vertont von Johann Erasmus Kindermann, 1652
- Heilige Karwochen, Predigten, 1653
- Geistliches Klaghaus, oder Christliche Leichpredigten, 1655
- Ehre der Ehe, illustrierte Ehelehre, 1662
- Heilig epistolischer Bericht, 2-teiliger Band 1663/1661 (digitised)
- Herz- und Seelenspeise, Postille, 1661 (2. Aufl. 1663 mit 450 Gedichten Birkens)
- Drei-ständige Sonn- und Festtag-Emblemata, hrsg. von D. Peil, Hildesheim 1994
