= Post-Reformation Digital Library =

Database of digitized books

The Post-Reformation Digital Library (PRDL) is a database of digitized books from the early modern era. The collected titles are directly linked to full-text versions of the works in question. The bibliography was initially inclined toward Protestant writers from the Reformation and immediate Post-Reformation era (the later sometimes characterized as the age of Protestant Scholasticism). In its current development the project is moving toward being a comprehensive database of early modern theology and philosophy and also includes late medieval and patristic works printed in the early modern period.

The database is a project of the Junius Institute for Digital Reformation Research at Calvin Theological Seminary, and was produced in cooperation with the H. Henry Meeter Center for Calvin Studies, a joint undertaking of Calvin College and Calvin Theological Seminary.

As bibliographical projects such as VD 16, VD 17, and English Short Title Catalogue, have a more narrow national or regional focus, meta-bibliographical tools such as PRDL and Early Modern Thought Online play a vital role in facilitating scholarship in the rapidly changing technological landscape.

== See also ==
- List of digital library projects
- Digital curation
- Category:Digital libraries
- Category:Geographic region-oriented digital libraries

== Sources ==
- Reformation Library Expands its Reach, Christian Reformed Church in North America, archived from the original on 2013-04-14.
- "Webbibliotheek met theologisch werk gelanceerd", Reformatorisch Dagblad (in Dutch).
- "Online archive opens the Reformers' works at US seminary", The Presbyterian Outlook, archived from the original on 2012-04-20.
- PRDL has a new home at Junius Institute for Digital Reformation Research of Calvin Theological Seminary, Post-Reformation Digital Library.
- Calvin Theological Seminary launches new digital research center for Reformation studies, Junius Institute, 22 April 2013.
