= VD =

VD may refer to:

== Arts and entertainment ==
- The Vampire Diaries
- Ivan Vdović (1960–1992), Serbian drummer
- Veni Domine, a Swedish metal band
- Vicious Delite, a metal band featuring Ratt's Stephen Pearcy
- Vijay Deverakonda (born 1989), Indian actor, often abbreviated to VD (as in film titles like VD13)
- Varun Dhawan (born 1987), Indian film actor, sometimes abbreviated as VD (as in film titles like VD18)

== Holidays ==
- Valentine's Day, a holiday
- Veterans Day, a holiday
- Victory Day, a public holiday in several countries

== Science and technology ==
- V_{d}, design diving speed for an aircraft, see V speeds for further information
- Vaginal delivery, a natural birth
- Vapour density, the density of a vapor in relation to that of hydrogen
- Venereal disease, now more commonly known as sexually transmitted disease or sexually transmitted infection
- Virtual desktop, expansion of the space of a computer's desktop environment beyond the physical limits of the screen
- Virtual directory, in computing
- Visual design
- Volume of distribution (V_{D})
- Volumetric Display
- Video decoder
- Videodisc

== Other uses ==
- Van der (v.d.), a prefix in Dutch language surnames
- Vaud, a canton in Switzerland
- Vd., an abbreviation of the Spanish personal pronoun usted
- Volunteer Officers' Decoration, a Crown honour or long-service award made to auxiliary army officers of the British Empire between 1894 and 1931
- Volga-Dnepr Airlines, Russian cargo airline
- Henan Airlines (IATA code VD), former Chinese airline
- Victoria Dockside

== See also ==
- Vroom & Dreesmann (V&D), a former Dutch retail chain
- 495 (number), in roman numerals can be represented as "VD" (500-5)
- VD 16, Bibliography of Books Printed in the German Speaking Countries of the Sixteenth Century
- VD 17, Bibliography of Books Printed in the German Speaking Countries from 1601 to 1700
