= Sepp Schönmetzler =

German figure skater, coach and journalist

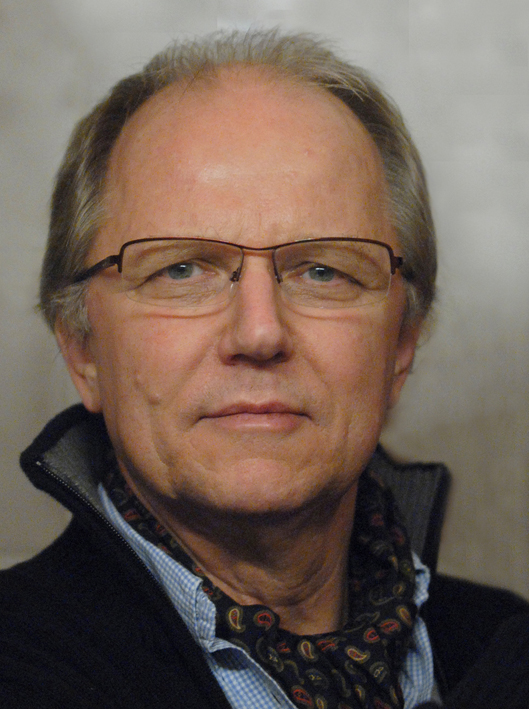
- Sepp Schönmetzler

Personal information
- Born: 24 September 1944 (age 81) Etzdorf, Saxony, Germany
- Height: 1.73 m (5 ft 8 in)

Figure skating career
- Country: Germany; West Germany
- Skating club: SC Rießersee
- Retired: 1965

Sepp Schönmetzler (born 24 September 1944 in Etzdorf, Saxony) is a German figure skater, coach, and journalist. He is the 1962 and 1965 German national champion and placed 12th at the 1964 Winter Olympics. He produces the German figure skating magazine Eissport-Magazin.

== Biography ==
=== Personal life ===
In 1963, Sepp Schönmetzler finished school and passed his Abitur in Oberstdorf.

In 1965, he was honored with honorary citizenship of Colorado Springs, Colorado, United States.

Beginning in 1967, he studied photography at the Staatlichen Höheren Fachschule, in Cologne. He passed his degree in 1970 and became a Diplom-Engineer for technical-scientific photography. In 1976, he studied science of sport at the sport-college in Cologne (DSHS). He finished these studies in 1979 as a Diplom-sport-teacher.

In 1984 he did his PhD at the DSHS in sports-science in the fields biomechanics and general coaching and moving science (Bewegungslehre).

In 1979, Sepp Schönmetzler married Sabine Beier. The couple had two children. They divorced on 31 January 2002.

=== Competitive career ===
Sepp Schönmetzler began skating at age four. He represented the club SC Rießersee in national competition and was coached by his father, Josef Schönmetzler, a Diplom Sport-Teacher. His mother, Sonja Schönmetzler (nee Fuchs) was a sportswomen.

In addition to figure skating, Schönmetzler also competed in golf, tennis and shaolin temple boxing.

He won the German Figure Skating Championships in 1962 and 1965. He represented the United Team of Germany at the 1964 Winter Olympics, where he placed 12th. He also competed at the World Figure Skating Championships, with a highest placement of 7th, which he achieved in 1963, and at the European Figure Skating Championships, with a highest placement of 4th, which he achieved in 1965.

He retired from competitive skating in 1965. He turned professional and toured for two years with the Ice Capades.

=== Professional career ===
Beginning in 1967, he worked also as a coach for the Cologne Iceclub (Kölner Eisklub). In 1970 he became certified coach for figure skating (Fachübungsleiter). In 1972, he started to work for the German newspaper BILD as a photo-journalist for three months in Cologne and later in Hamburg. In 1972 he worked voluntarily for the 1972 Summer Olympics in Munich. He took part in producing the village newspaper (Dorfzeitung).

In 1977 he became a certified coach for tennis. From 1979 to 1991, he worked for the DSHS as scientific employee. Also from 1979 on Sepp Schönmetzler worked as a coach-teacher for the German sport association Deutscher Sportbund, LSB, the coaching academy in Cologne, for the German figure skation association DEU and its association in the state of North Rhine-Westphalia and others.

In 1983, Schönmetzler became the leading coach of the ice sport department of the club TSV Bayer 04 and worked there for three years. In 1986, Sepp Schönmetzler became the federal coach of Austria for figure skating and served in that position for one year. In 1988, he became the leading coach at the club TUS Wiehl 1891.

Since 1992 Sepp Schönmetzler works as a freelance coach and sport event manager. He founded the publishing house for scientific sport information (Verlag für Sportfachinformation) and publishes the German ice sport magazine "Eissport-Magazin”.

== Competitive results ==
International
Event	1960	1961	1962	1963	1964	1965
Winter Olympics					12th	
World Championships			13th	7th	10th	11th
European Championships		7th	8th	5th	6th	4th
National
German Championships	3rd	2nd	1st	2nd		1st
