= Sigismund Evenius =

German educationalist, teacher, and writer

- Born: ca. 1587; Nauen, Germany
- Died: 17 September 1639 date of burial Weimar, Saxe-Weimar, Germany
- Occupation: educationalist

Sigismund Evenius (ca. 1587 – 17 September 1639) was a German educationalist, teacher and writer.

== Life ==
Evenius was born in Nauen, a mid-sized town a short distance to the west of Potsdam and Berlin. His father was a clothier/weaver. On 23 April 1602 Sigismund Evenius commenced his studies at Leucorea (subsequently part of Wittemberg University). In due course he emerged with a Magister qualification, and in 1611 he obtained a position in the Philosophy faculty. Shortly after this, in 1613, he relocated to Halle, becoming the rector of the Gymnasium (school). During his time in Halle he came into contact with the education reformer Wolfgang Ratke, on whose ideas he seized. In 1618 he visited Köthen in order to see the implementation of Ratke's ideas at first hand. It is evident that Evenius was so enthused by Ratke's ideas that he began teaching, primarily religion, at according to Ratke's Christian school precepts, using the vernacular (rather than Latin), despite personal differences between the two of them. He also put together a plan to create a "German Arts School", which would promote practical awareness with hands-on craftsmanship activities. His parting contribution, when he left Halle in 1622, was a speech entitled "De contemtu scholarum scholasticique ordinis".

While in Halle Evenius produced a work in which he addressed the doctrine of the Eucharist, which set him against, in particular, the Jesuits and the Protestant reformed churches. Notwithstanding his essential humanism, his basic commitment to the tenets of Lutheranism is apparent across his writing. With his appointment later the same year as rector of the Gymnasium in Magdeburg he gave another speech entitled "De vindicando huiusmodi contemtu". It is evident from these and from his subsequent writings and activities that he was fully engaged in the passionate sectarian disputes which were erupting across much of western Europe at the time. His progressive approach to schooling continued in Magdeburg where initial teaching took place in the students' mother tongue, and instruction in other languages following one by one, extending only later to the classics. Religious instruction was an important segment of the overall curriculum but it did not, at this stage, provide the context for the entire curriculum, as it would come to do during the 1630s. It is apparent from his subsequently published writings that he was also deeply concerned for the moral condition of the young men sent to him to be educated.

Magdeburg was besieged and then destroyed by Catholic armies under Tilly and others in 1630/1631. Historians sometimes contend that the Thirty Years' War was the most destructive event in Europe prior to the twentieth century: the massacre in Magdeburg that followed the surrender of the city may have involved the death of perhaps 20,000 inhabitants. Military destruction was followed, as so often, by plague. Evenius fled with his family to Tallinn where he took over the headship of the newly founded Gymnasium (school).

== Sigismund Evenius: Published output (not a complete list) ==
- Formul und Abriß wie eine christliche und evangelische Schule wohl und richtig anzustellen sei, Halle 1618
- Methodi… compendiosioris…demonstrata veritas, Halle 1620
- Christianarum scholarum unum necessarium, 1630, Nuremberg 1634
- Speculum intimae coruptionis, Lüneburg 1640
- Ernestinische Bibel, Nuremberg 1640, 1720
- Christlich- gottselige Katechismusschule …, Jena 1636, French 1666, Italian 1673

He returned to Germany less than a year later, however. In 1633 he took charge of the Gymnasium (school) in Regensburg. Evenius had been much affected by the destruction of Magdeburg and his writings, which from now on were published in German rather than Latin, disclose the (then widely held) belief that his former home-city's fate had been some sort of a judgement, reflecting God's anger over he conduct of citizens. In 1634 he was summoned to Weimar, accepting an appointment from The future Duke as Schools Advisor (Kirchen- und Schulrat). Duke Ernest I would gain a reputation as a practical champion for Lutheranism and an educational pioneer: Sigismund Evenius took part in setting up and expanding a new style of school system, and he also produced the widely distributed (German language) "Ernestine Bible". Evenius believed that the destructive consequences of the Thirty Years' War must be addressed by improvements in education, and although he himself died in 1639, he lived long enough to help create a firm basis for some of those improvements. After his death his influence was if anything more apparent than earlier, as a result of the education reforms successfully enacted by Duke Ernest, the practical extent of whose own authority would be extended through the timely death of an elder brother.
