= David Schirmer =

German lyric poet and librarian

David Schirmer (29 May 1623 – 1686) was a German lyric poet and librarian, who also used the pseudonyms Der Bestimmende, Der Beschirmende and DiSander. He is considered one of the most gifted lyric poets of the Baroque era.

== Biography ==
Schirmer was born in Pappendorf into a family of evangelical pastors that already had a literary tradition. Initially educated by his father, in 1640, he studied under Christian Gueintz at the Gymnasium in Halle. In 1641, he enrolled as a student at Leipzig, and from 1645, studied under August Buchner in Wittenberg. In 1647 Philipp von Zesen admitted him into his literary society, the Deutschgesinnte Genossenschaft. From 1649 Schirmer worked as Hofdichter (court poet) at Dresden, and in 1650 his first collection of poetry was published.

Schirmer obtained musical settings for 68 of his poems from the Dresden court musician Philipp Stolle, and these were published in 1654 as the songbook Singende Rosen Oder Liebes-und Tugend-Lieder. Stolle's settings were for soprano, theorbo or viola da gamba, and basso continuo. Schirmer later included 51 of the songs from Singende Rosen in his 1657 collection Poetische Rosen-Gepüsche. The latter, a two-part collection of 800 pages, showed him at the height of his poetic creativity. His great skill in lyric love poetry and Lied (German song) verse owed something to the influences of Martin Opitz and Paul Fleming. A later volume, Poetische Rauten-Gepüsche (1663), provided 700 pages of the kind of occasional poetry and courtly diversions that his position as court poet demanded of him.

In 1655, he was appointed as Hofbibliothekar (court librarian), succeeding Christian Brehme. After nearly 30 years of activity, in 1683, he retired due to illness, and died three years later in Dresden. He was buried on 12 August 1686.

== Sources ==
- Harper, Anthony J (2003). German Secular Song-books of the Mid-Seventeenth Century. Aldershot, Hampshire: Ashgate. ISBN 0-7546-0642-2.
