= Books in Germany =

As of 2018, ten firms in Germany rank among the world's biggest publishers of books in terms of revenue: C.H. Beck, Bertelsmann, Cornelsen Verlag, Haufe-Gruppe, Holtzbrinck Publishing Group, Ernst Klett Verlag, Springer Nature, Thieme, WEKA Holding, and Westermann Druck- und Verlagsgruppe. (Note: Of these, several also topped the list in 2016 and 2017.) Overall, "Germany has some 2,000 publishing houses, and more than 90,000 titles reach the public each year, a production surpassed only by the United States." Unlike many other countries, "book publishing is not centered in a single city but is concentrated fairly evenly in Berlin, Hamburg, and the regional metropolises of Cologne, Frankfurt, Stuttgart, and Munich."

== History ==
In the 1450s in Mainz, Johannes Gutenberg printed a Bible using movable metal type, a technique that quickly spread to other German towns and throughout Europe.

In the 1930s Nazis conducted book burnings, over 25,000 books were burned in at least 34 cities. These books included works by Jewish authors, American authors, and other opponents of Nazism.

German publishers issued around 61,000 book titles in 1990, and around 83,000 in 2000.

Recent historians of the book in Germany include Bernhard Fabian and Paul Raabe.

== Fairs ==
The influential Frankfurt Book Fair began in 1454, and the Leipzig Book Fair in 1632.

== Collections ==
Outside of Germany, collections of German books include those stored in the UK at the British Library and London Library; in the US at Harvard University and Yale University.

== In popular culture ==
In 2006 a temporary sculpture about German book history was installed at Bebelplatz in Berlin as part of the Walk of Ideas.

== See also ==
- Copyright law of Germany
- Legal deposit in Germany
- Börsenverein des Deutschen Buchhandels
- Deutsche Nationalbibliografie
- Verzeichnis der im deutschen Sprachbereich erschienenen Drucke des 16. Jahrhunderts
- Verzeichnis der im deutschen Sprachraum erschienenen Drucke des 17. Jahrhunderts
- Verzeichnis der im deutschen Sprachraum erschienenen Drucke des 18. Jahrhunderts
- German literature
- Media of Germany
- Open access in Germany to scholarly communication

== Bibliography ==
=== in English ===
- G.W. Porter; G.K. Fortescue, eds. (1889). "Bibliographies of Countries: Germany". List of Bibliographical Works in the Reading Room of the British Museum (2nd ed.). London. OCLC 3816244 – via Internet Archive.
- Robert Proctor (1898). "Books Printed From Types: Germany". Index to the Early Printed Books in the British Museum. London: Kegan Paul, Trench, Trübner and Company. pp. 29+. hdl:2027/uc1.c3450631. OCLC 6438080 – via HathiTrust.. Part 2
- Alice Bertha Kroeger; Isadore Gilbert Mudge (1917). "Bibliography: National and Trade: German". Guide to the Study and Use of Reference Books (3rd ed.). American Library Association.
- Albert Ward (1974). Book production, fiction and the German reading public: 1740-1800. Clarendon Press. ISBN 0198181574.
- Ronald A. Fullerton (1977). "Creating a Mass Book Market in Germany: The Story of the "Colporteur Novel" 1870-1890". Journal of Social History. 10 (3): 265–283. doi:10.1353/jsh/10.3.265. JSTOR 3786389.
- Allen Kent; et al., eds. (1978). "Printers and Printing". Encyclopedia of Library and Information Science. Vol. 23. Marcel Dekker. ISBN 978-0-8247-2023-0. (Includes info about Germany)
- P. Weidhaas (1995). "Germany". In Philip G. Altbach; Edith S. Hoshino (eds.). International Book Publishing: An Encyclopedia. Garland. ISBN 9781134261260.
- John Sandford, ed. (1999). Encyclopedia of Contemporary German Culture. Routledge. ISBN 978-1-136-81603-1. (Includes articles about book clubs, publishing, etc.)
- "Germany: Directory: Publishers". Europa World Year Book. Europa Publications. 2004. ISBN 978-1-85743-254-1.
- Euromedia Research Group; Mary Kelly; et al., eds. (2004). "Germany: Book Publishing". Media in Europe (3rd ed.). SAGE Publications. p. 81+. ISBN 978-0-7619-4132-3.
- Gideon Reuveni (2006). Reading Germany: Literature and Consumer Culture in Germany Before 1933. Berghahn Books. ISBN 978-1-84545-087-8.
- John L. Flood (2013). "Germany". In Michael F. Suarez; H. R. Woudhuysen (eds.). The Book: A Global History. Oxford University Press. ISBN 978-0-19-967941-6.
- "Would You Like Some Sausage With Your Novel?", The New York Times, 22 September 2018

=== in German ===
- Allgemeines Bücher-Lexicon [General Book List] (in German), Heinsius, 1793–1798, OCLC 491343885
- Verzeichniß neuer Bücher [Directory of New Books] (in German), Leipzig: Hinrichs, 1794–1822, OCLC 894883757
- Christian Gottlob Kayser [in Italian] (1834–1911), Vollständiges Bücher-Lexicon [Complete Book List] (in German), OCLC 496011129
- "Archiv für Geschichte des Buchwesens" [Archive for the History of the Book], Archiv für Geschichte des Buchwesens Agb (in German), ISSN 0066-6327 1958-
- Reinhard Wittmann [in German] (1991). Geschichte des deutschen Buchhandels: ein Uberblick [History of the German Book Trade: an Overview] (in German). C.H. Beck. ISBN 3406354254.
- Jäger, Georg (2013-02-07). Geschichte des deutschen Buchhandels im 19. und 20. Jahrhundert [History of the German book trade in the 19th and 20th centuries] (in German). Walter de Gruyter. ISBN 978-3-11-095617-7. Multiple volumes, 2001-

=== Filmography ===
- How to Make a Book with Steidl, 2010; about Steidl publisher in Göttingen

== Images ==
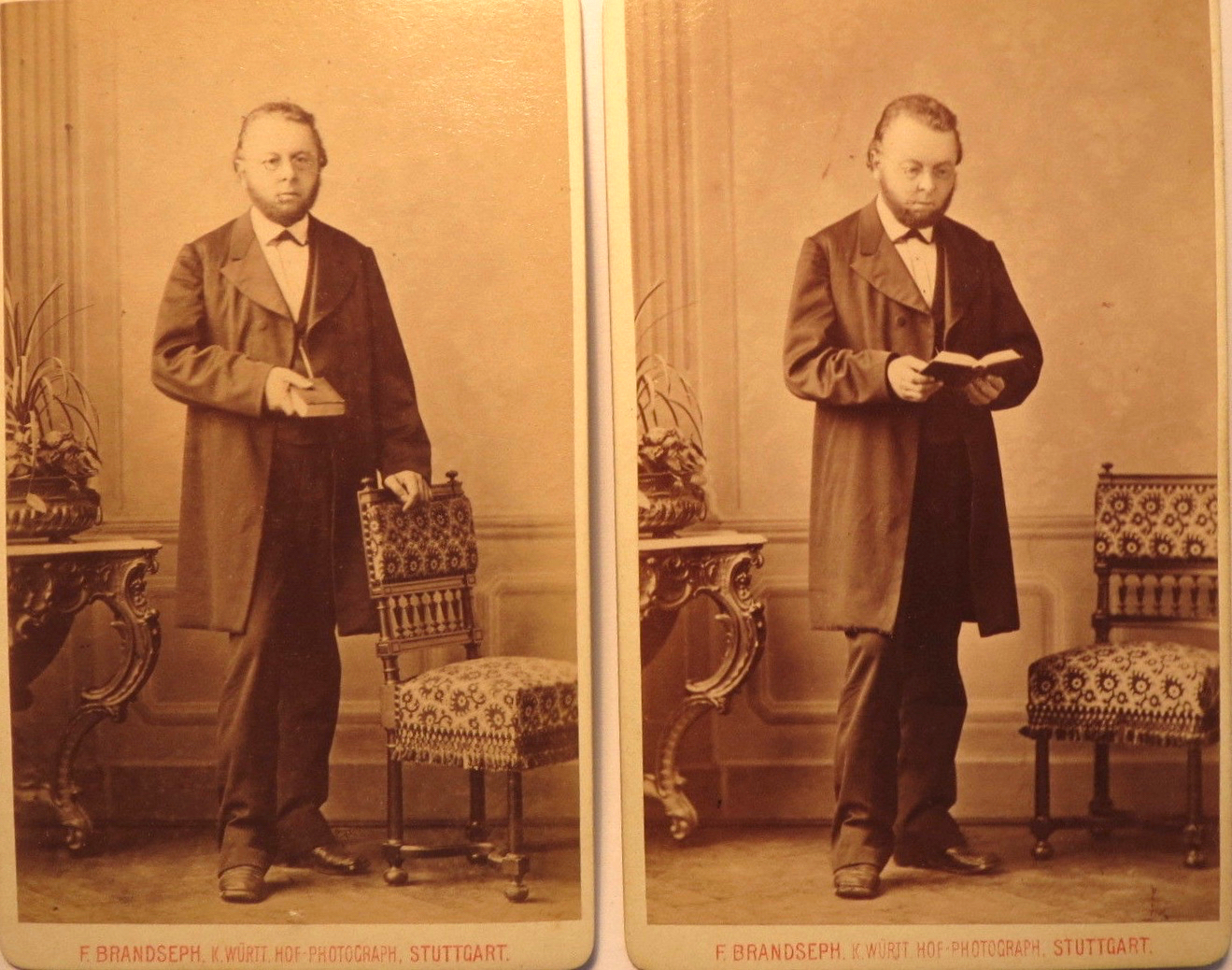
Man with book, Stuttgart, circa 1890s; photo by Friedrich Brandseph

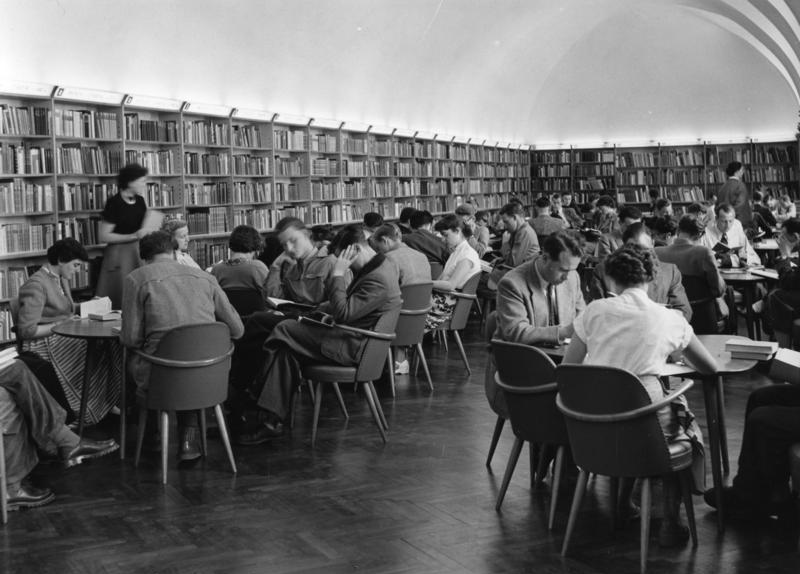
Readers in Bonn, 1950

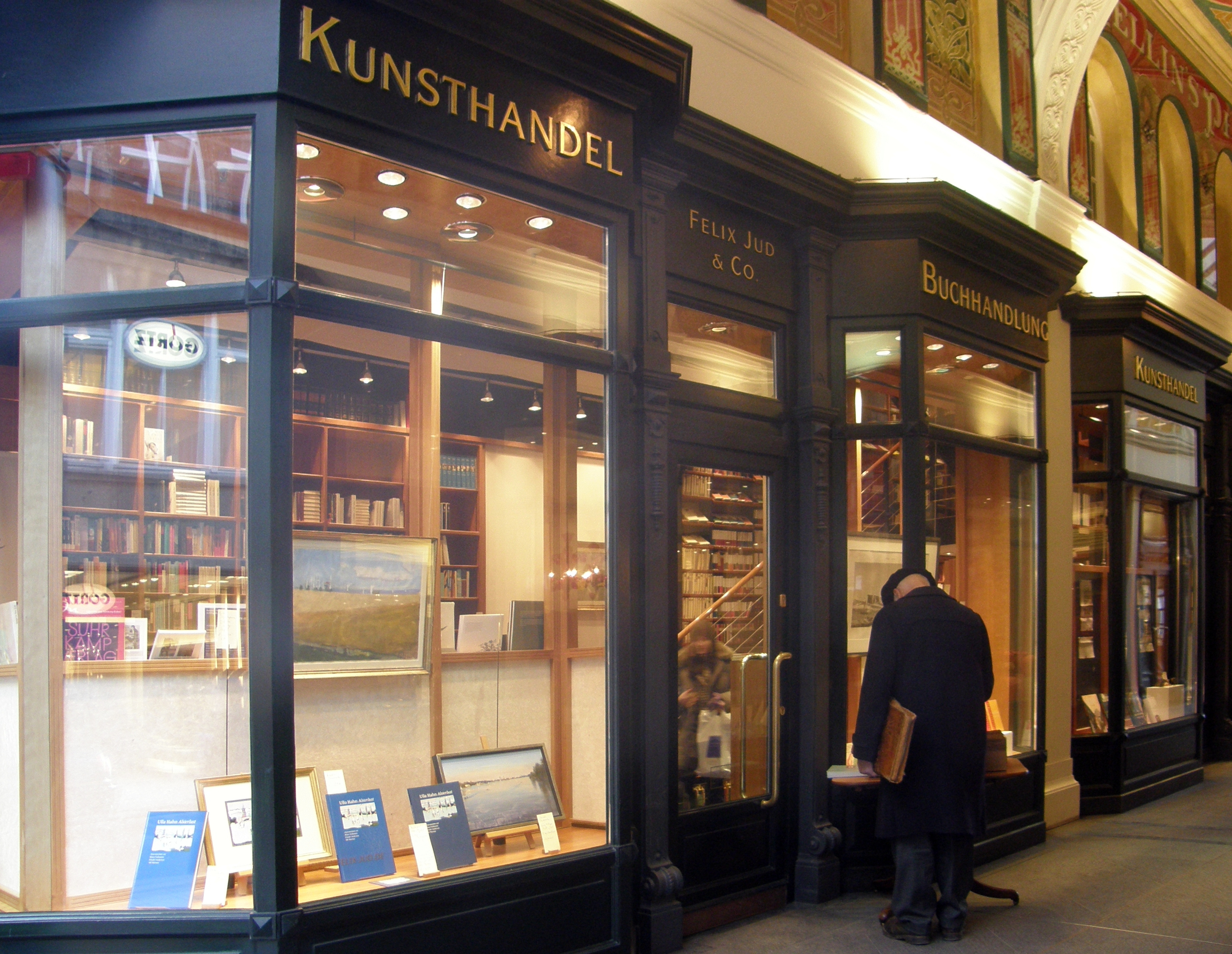
Felix Jud bookshop, Hamburg, 2010

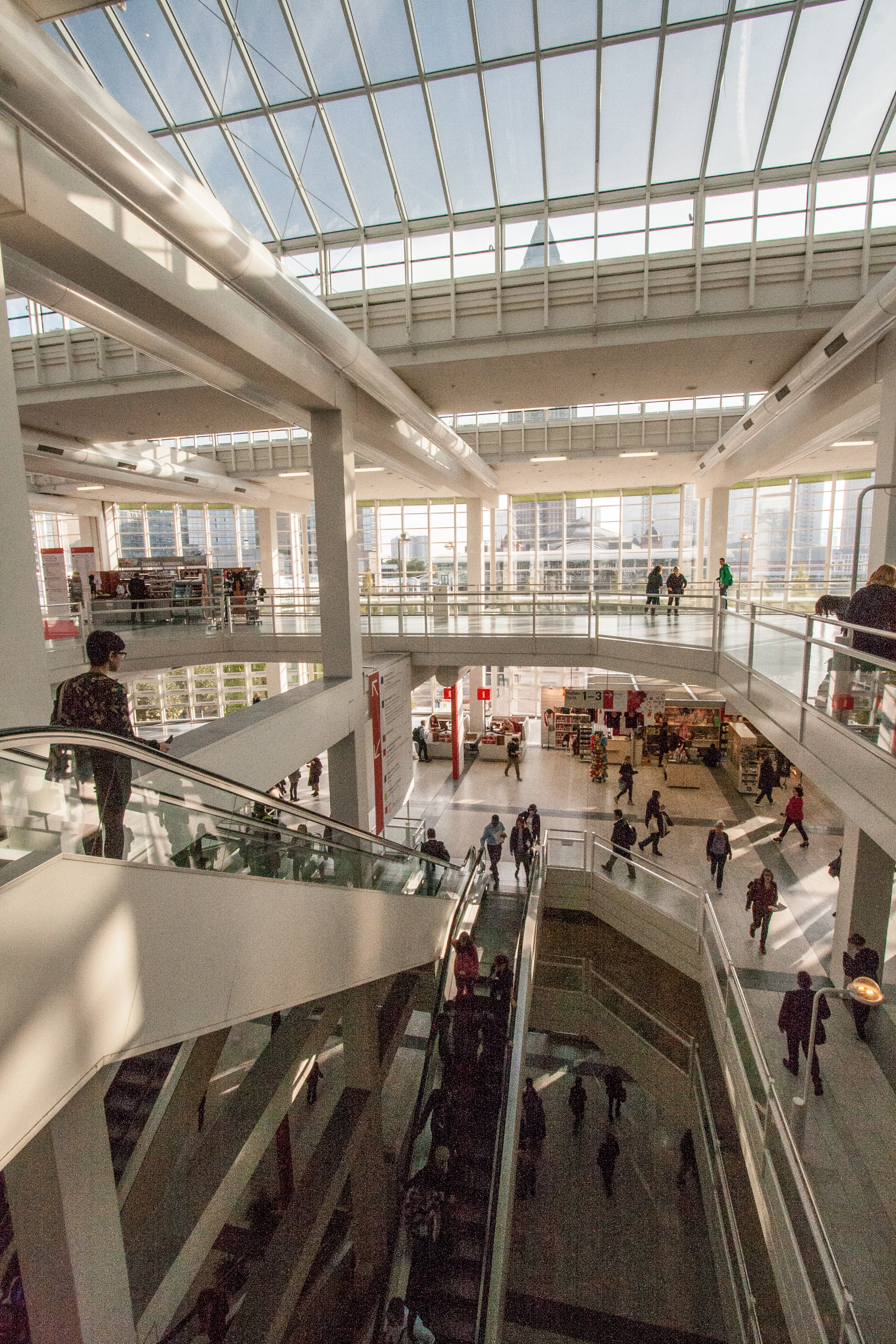
Frankfurt Book Fair, October 2017
