= Irrhain =

Coordinates: 49°30′53″N 11°3′38″E

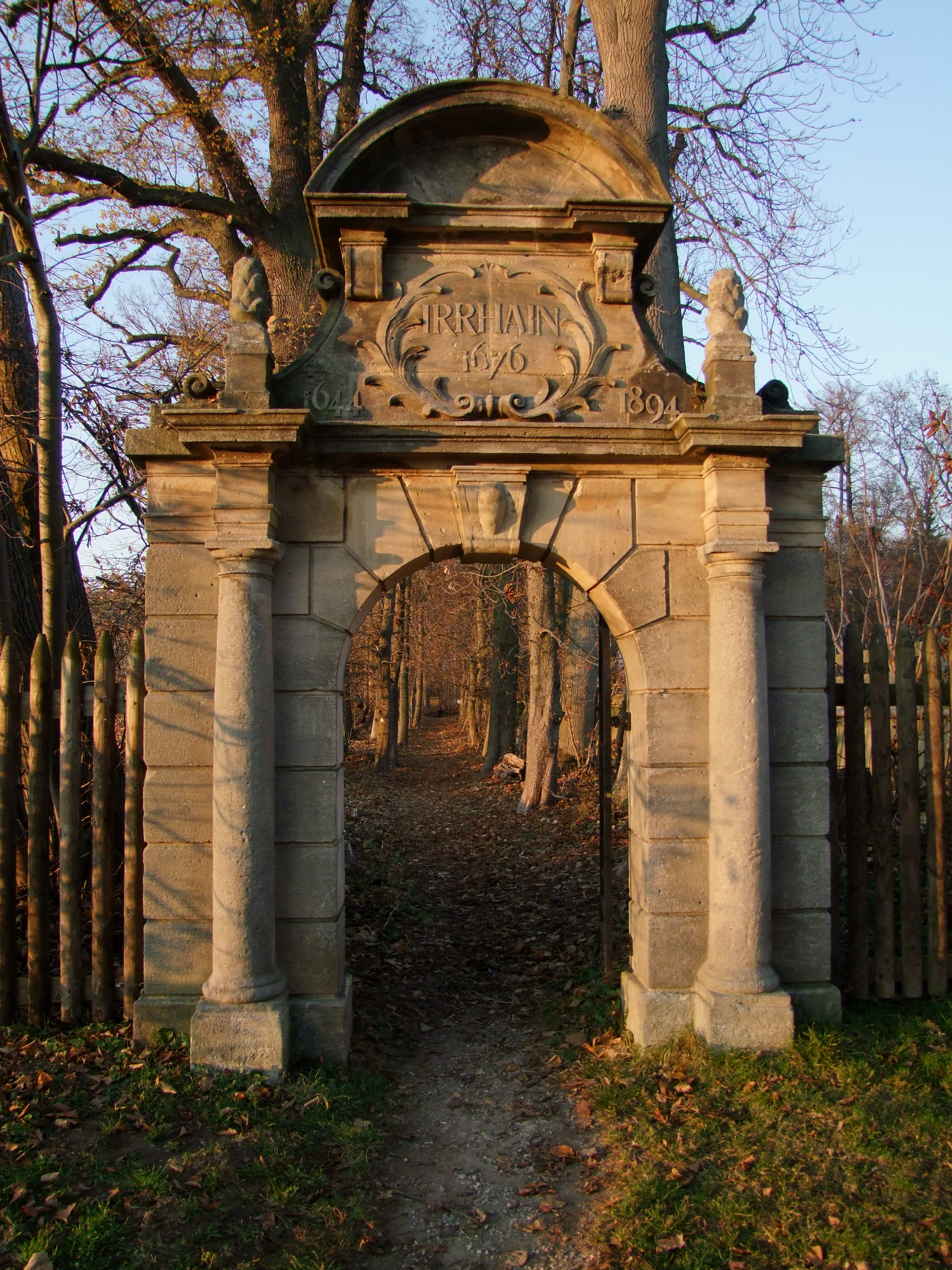
Baroque arch in front of the alley

Irrhain (German: Irrhain) — is a small landscape-ecological and cultural-historical nature reserve within the Nuremberg agglomeration. It is located north of the city's airport on lands bearing the historical name «Knoblauchland» — «Garlic Field», where farms are located that largely provide the city with fresh vegetables.

== History ==
The ecological significance of the reserve is expressed in the fact that it is a piece of forest that has been preserved in its natural form, which is especially important due to the fact that most of the German forests are the result of artificial planting of coniferous trees, while originally they were formed by deciduous trees.

Some specimens of the trees have died and are reported by stationary signs to be a fall hazard. However, they are not removed because they are the natural habitat of insects.

The safety of the place is also connected with the fact that in 1676 from the banks of the Pegnitz, now within the city limits, moved the «Pegnesischer Blumenorden» — an association of writers who support the style of their writings in the Baroque style. The association still exists and poetic holidays are organized here in the summer.

Initially, the circle of poets around Georg Philipp Harsdörfer and Johann Clay, who founded the flower order in 1644, met in the so-called poetic grove near Weidenmühle, a peninsula formed by the old waters of the Pegnitz. After the owner of the property made the place inaccessible with a fence, the participants gathered at the Half Moon house, which was owned by Andreas Ingolstetter.

In order to be able to cultivate poetry close to nature again, Kraftshof's pastor Martin Limburger proposed to the then head of the order, Sigmund von Birken, in 1676, to create a new meeting place in an overgrown oak grove near the village of Kraftshof.

Limburger developed the concept of a talking garden, he understood the "mad forest" as a symbol of the "world's crazy forest", which corresponded to the then pietistic spirit. The work was completed in 1678, and in 1681 the Forest Alms Authority on the Sebalder side of the city confirmed to the Order of the Flowers that it had received "Irraine" as a perpetual fief.

== Description ==
The main entrance to the reserve is decorated in the form of a stone arch in the architectural style of the Baroque, behind which begins an alley leading to a forested area, on which monuments associated with the names of members of the order are installed. There is also a hut in which writers gathered.

== Gallery ==
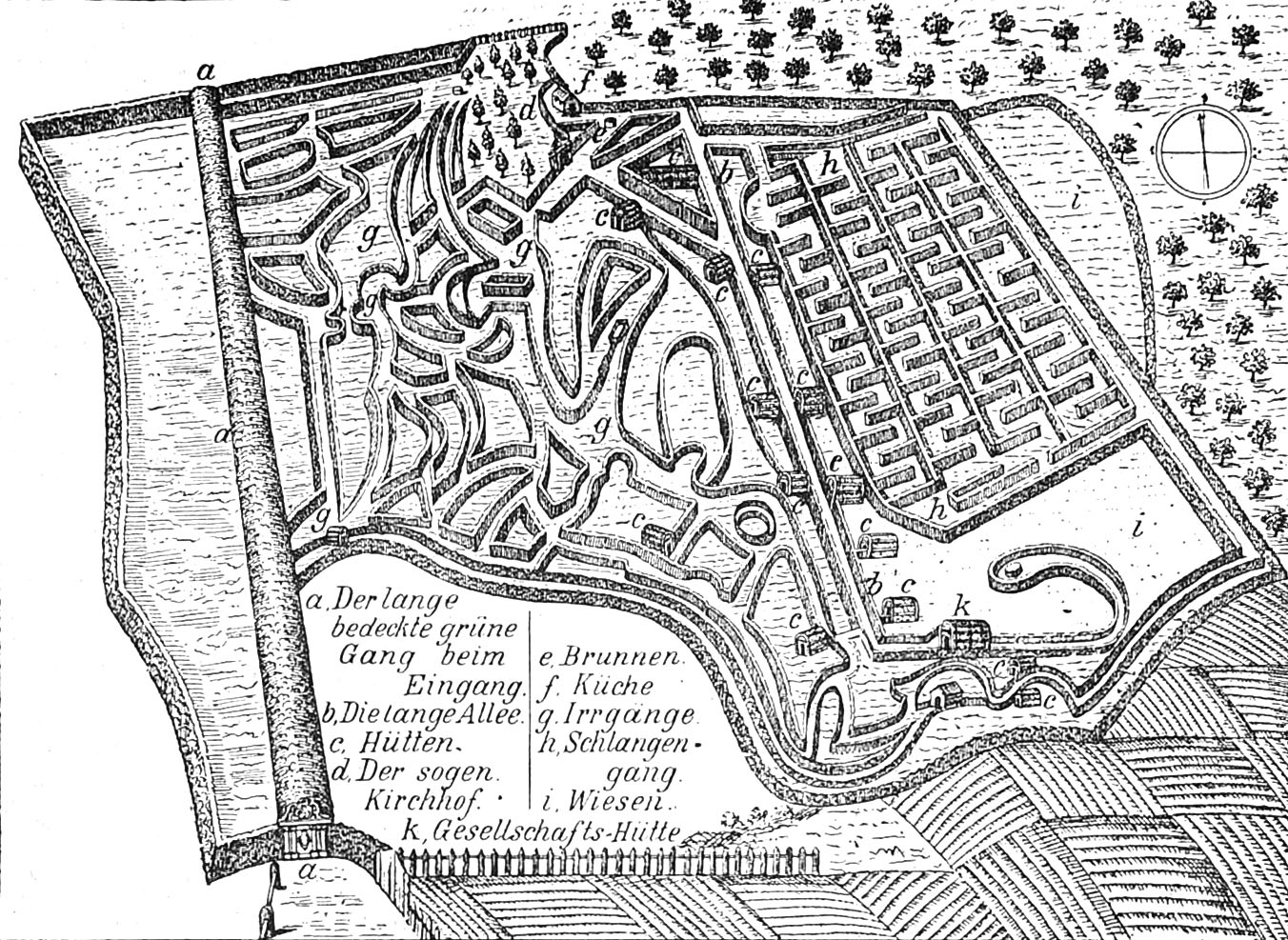
Labyrinth in 1676.

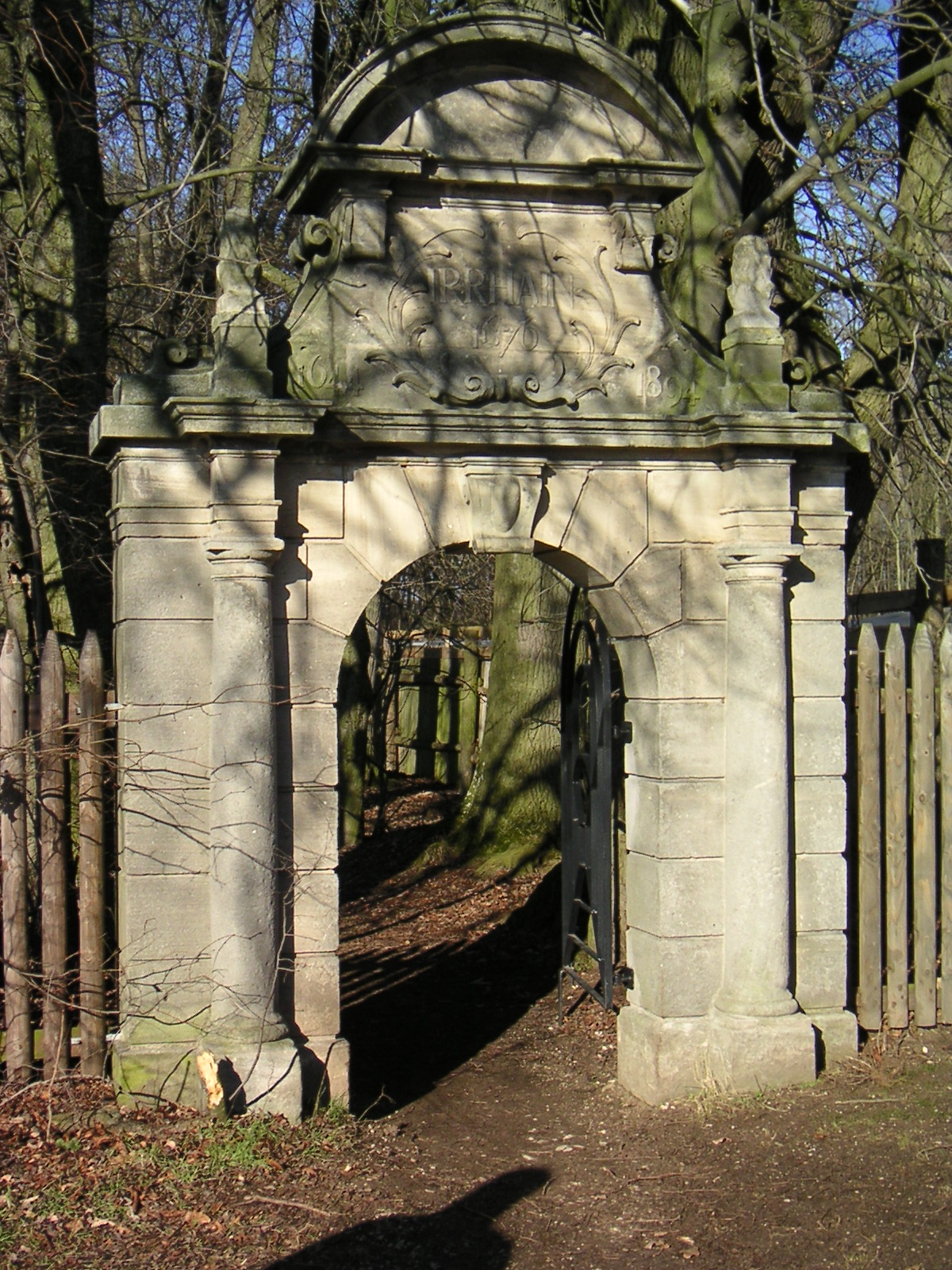
Entrance arch to the labyrinth

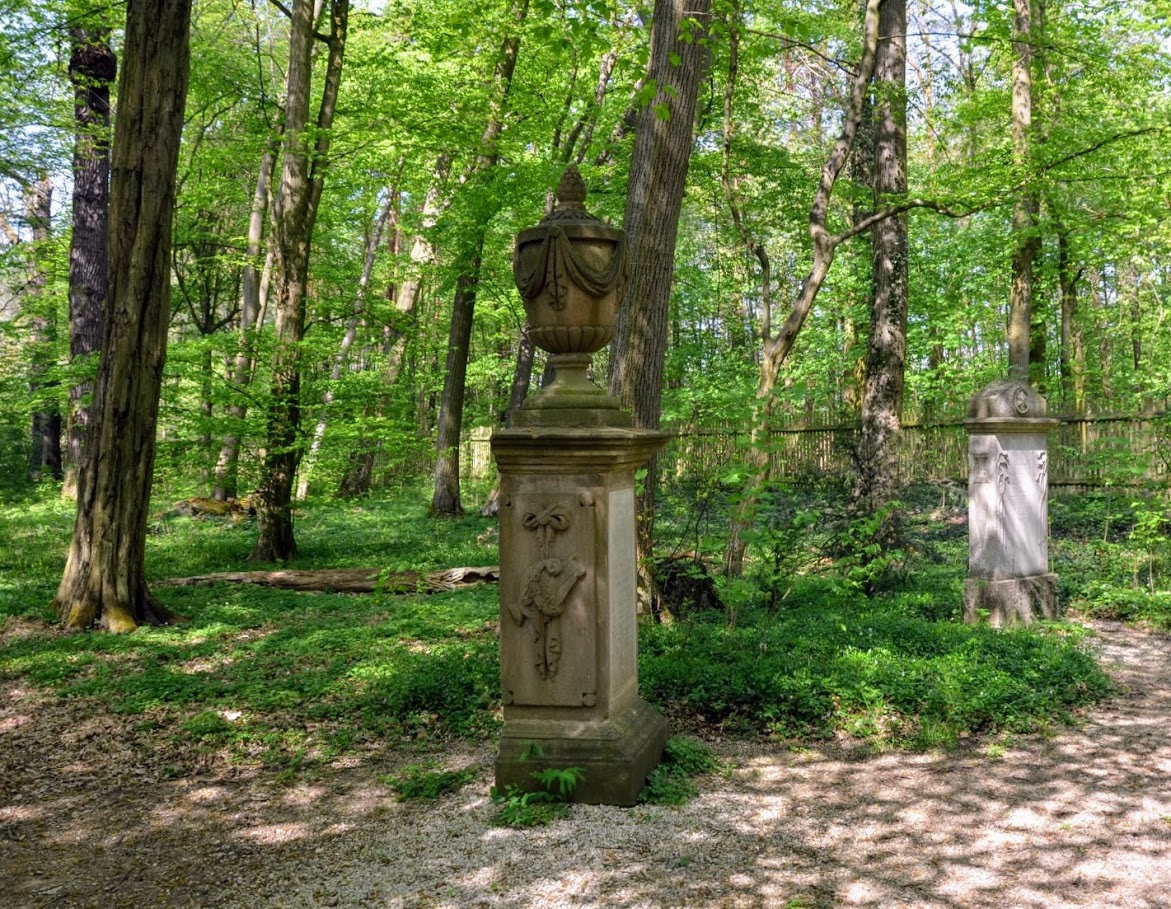
Memorial stones

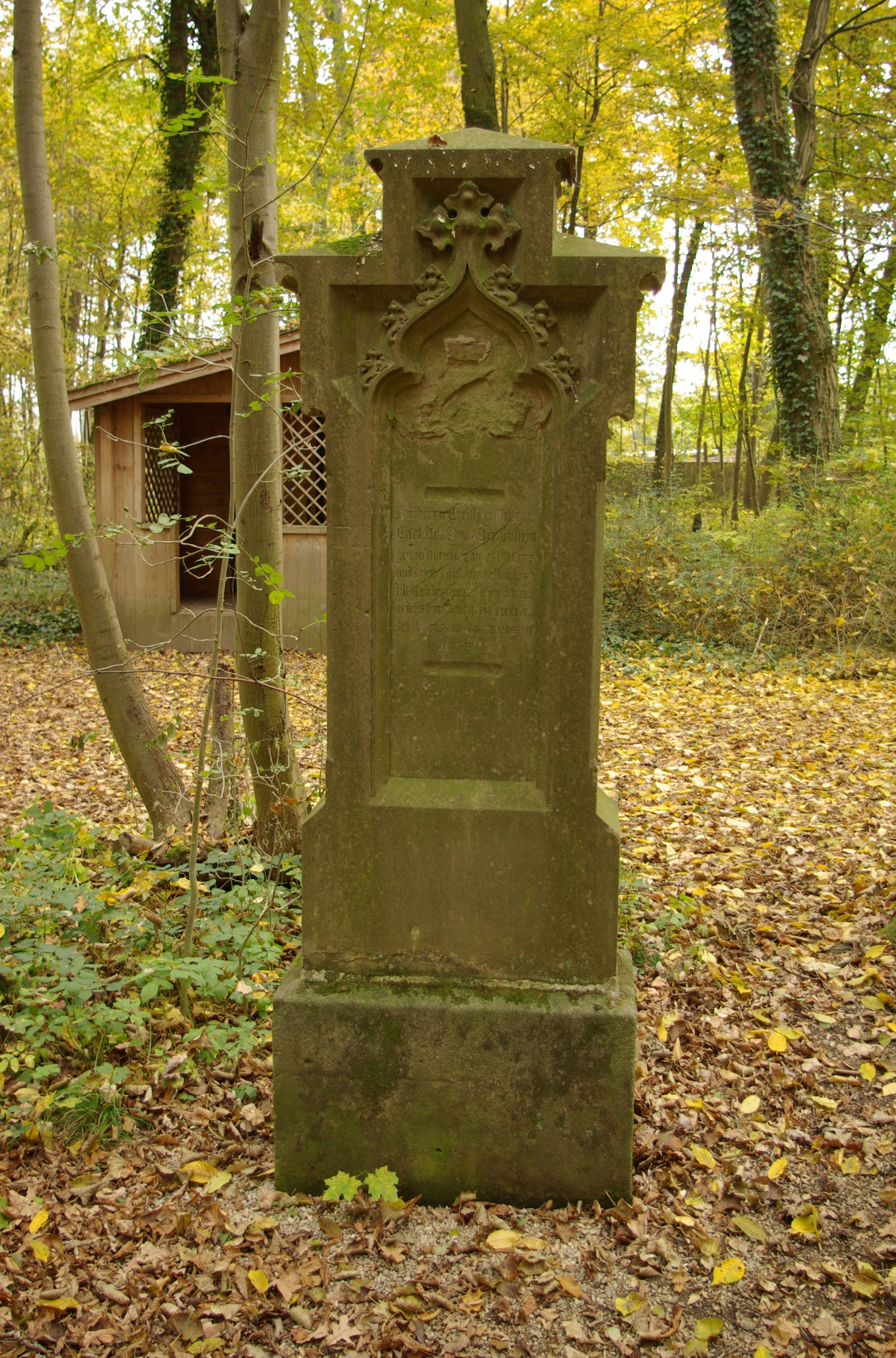
Memorial stones

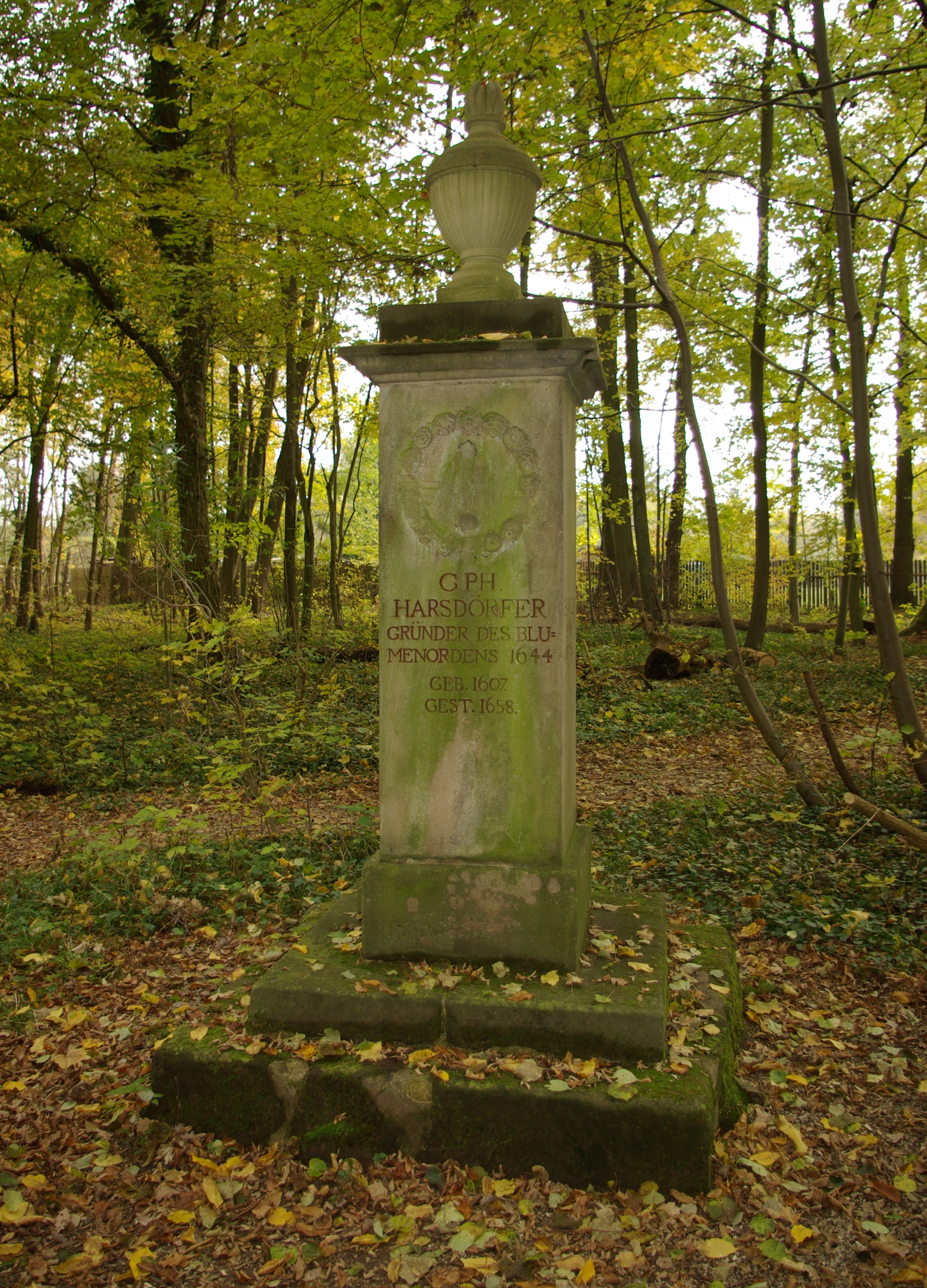
Irrhain

== See also ==
- Pegnesischer Blumenorden

== Bibliography ==
- Winter, Sascha: Arkadische Memoria um 1700. Kollektives Totengedenken des Pegnesischen Blumenordens im Irrhain bei Nürnberg. In: Annette Dorgerloh, Michael Niedermeier, Marcus Becker, Annette Dorgerloh (Hgg.): Grab und memoria im frühen Landschaftsgarten. Wilhelm Fink, München 2015, S. 117–151, ISBN 978-3-7705-5442-3.
- Wiegel, Helmut: Der Irrhain des Pegnesischen Blumenordens. In: Die Gartenkunst 5 (2/1993), S. 293–306.
- Hermann Rusam: Der Irrhain des Pegnesischen Blumenordens zu Nürnberg. Des löblichen Hirten- und Blumen-Ordens an der Pegnitz Irrwald bei Kraftshof. Altnürnberger Landschaft e.V. — Korn & Berg, Nürnberg 1983, 83 S., zahlr. Ill., ISBN 3-87432-089-8 (Schriftenreihe der Altnürnberger Landschaft; 33)
- Hermann Kern: Labyrinthe. Erscheinungsformen und Deutungen. 5000 Jahre Gegenwart eines Urbilds. München 1982 [3. Aufl. 1995], S. 383.
- Valeria Sokolova. Nürnberg und Nürnberger. 2011 Ekaterina Müller Medienagentür & Ubersetzungsbüro. Nürnberg ISBN 978-3-00-034848-8
- Karin Lucke.Franken.Köln: DuMont Buchverlag. 1994. ISBN 3-7701-3413-3
