= Tiefenbach, Saxony =

Tiefenbach
- Ortsteil of Striegistal
- Coat of arms
- Interactive map of Tiefenbach
- Location within Germany Location within Saxony
- Coordinates: 51°2′48″N 13°10′9″E
- Country: Germany
- State: Saxony
- District: Mittweida
- Town: Striegistal
- Disbanded: 2008
- Subdivisions: 9

Area
  - Total: 43.90 km^{2} (16.95 sq mi)
- Elevation: 300 m (980 ft)

Population (2006-12-31)
  - Total: 3,511
  - Density: 79.98/km^{2} (207.1/sq mi)
- Time zone: UTC+01:00 (CET)
  - Summer (DST): UTC+02:00 (CEST)
- Postal codes: 09661
- Dialling codes: 034322
- Vehicle registration: MW
- Website: www.tiefenbach-sachsen.de

Tiefenbach (German pronunciation: [ˈtiːfn̩bax]) is a former municipality in the district of Mittweida, in Saxony, Germany. It was formed in 1994 by the merger of the former municipalities Arnsdorf, Böhrigen, Dittersdorf, Etzdorf, Marbach and Naundorf. On 1 July 2008 Tiefenbach was absorbed into Striegistal.
