= Jakob Martini =

German theologian and philosopher (1570–1649)

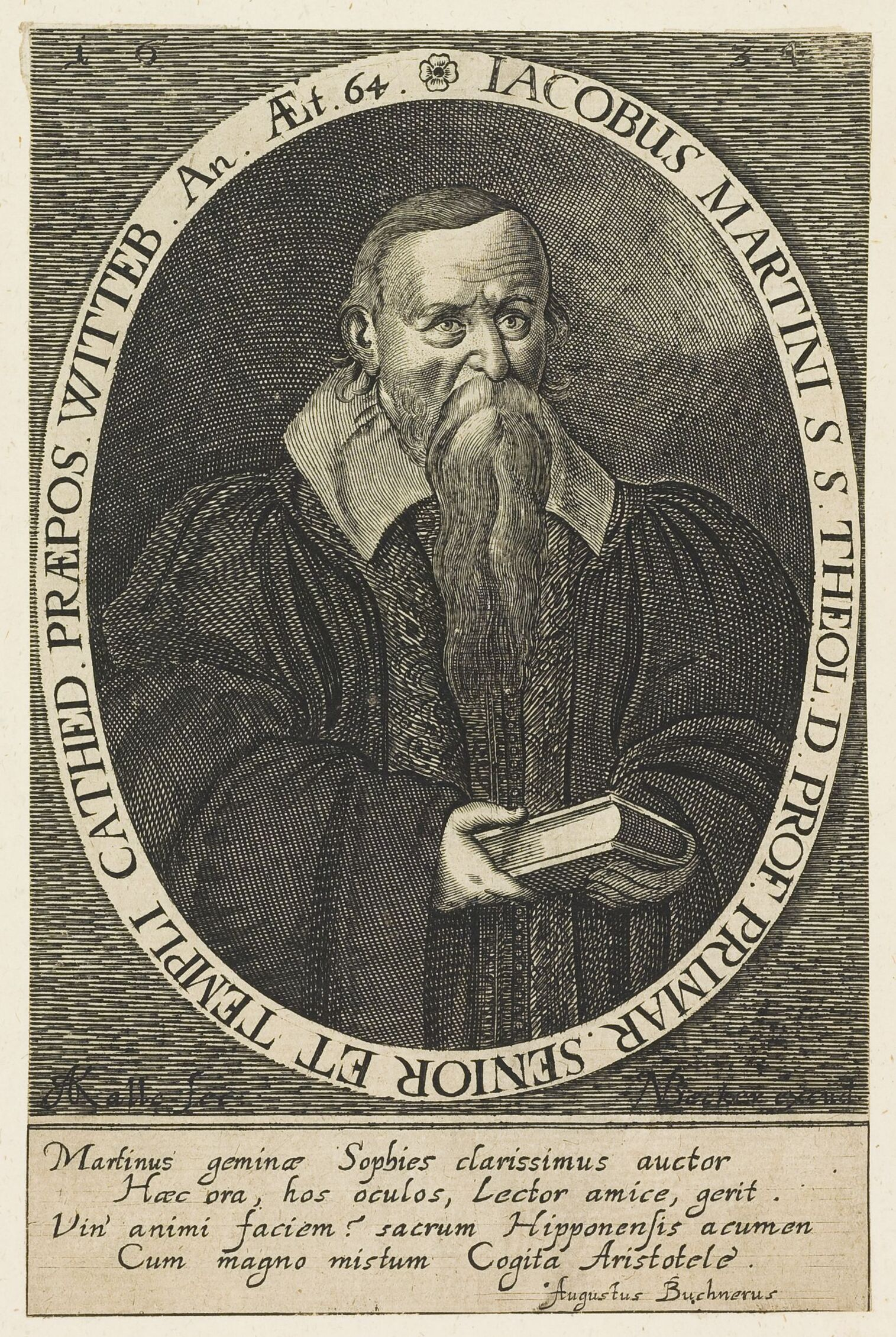
Jakob Martini (1570-1649), deutscher lutherischer Theologe und Philosoph Aus der Kupferstichsammlung der Bibliothek des evangelischen Predigerseminars in der Lutherstadt Wittenberg

Jakob Martini (17 October 1570 - 30 May 1649) was a German Lutheran theologian and philosopher.

== Biography ==
Jakob Martini was born at Langenstein (Halberstadt) in the hill country to the west of Magdeburg. Adam Martini, his father, was a pastor.

He matriculated (enrolled) at the University of Wittenberg on 21 April 1587 and then, on 10 February 1590, switched to the recently established University of Helmstedt. Here he pursued the study of philosophy under the direction of the Lutheran metaphysician and aristotelian, his namesake Cornelius Martini. Returning to Wittenberg, in 1593 Jakob Martini acquired a Master's degree. Under Polykarp Leyser the Elder and Aegidius Hunnius he acquired growing insight into the study of Theology, and in 1597 he took a teaching position in Norden (north of Emden, and along the coast to the west of present-day Bremerhaven) which also came with a pastoral appointment.

In 1602 he was called back to Wittenberg and appointed to a professorship in Logic and Metaphysics. In this work, he ordered all knowledge in a context of Lutheran orthodoxy, which led to a growing focus on Metaphysics, for which he did much to establish a Lutheran structure and opened up the "instrumental logic theory" associated with Jacopo Zabarella. Creating a specifically protestant "school" involved an adaptation of neo-scholastic metaphysics as it had developed in the post-tridentine Catholic Church, primarily through the work of the Salamanca scholar Francisco Suárez. From his academic teaching there emerged Martini's "Theorematum metaphysicorum exercitationes quatuordecim, continentes universam Metaphysicam in formam scientiae compendiose redactam".

Living in a period of intensified religious dispute, Martini saw his own life's mission as the fight against the Socinianism who embraced Nontrinitarianism and denied the pre-existence of Christ. Between 1614 and 1647 he was responsible for six substantial written works opposing Socinian beliefs. His motivation was based, at least in part, on practical concerns for the university and for the endurance of Lutheran doctrines. He was not alone. Metaphysical scholars were opposing Socinianism in Gießen, Tübingen, Rostock, Leipzig and Jena. Nevertheless, there is a prevalent view that Jakob Martini was the leading opponent of this contentious and, some felt, threatening set of doctrines. An important piece of teaching material in support of his lectures was Martini's "Institutionum Logicarum lihri VII". Alongside his regular lectures he conducted frequent disputations.

His sheer competence as an author of text books on Logic and Metaphysics gave the necessary impetus for his decision to produce systematically what amounted to an ongoing series designed to replace the existing traditional and Melanchthonian texts. Martini was the right man in the right place at the right time. The "visitors" (inspectors) for the three "princely schools" ("Fürstenschulen") at the universities of Leipzig and Wittenberg, the teachers at the three princely school as well as the members of the "Oberkonsistoria" (loosely, "governing bodies") were all persuaded that it would be a good thing to replace the "Dialektiks" of the Melanchthonian scholar Lucas Lossius, and the "Rhetorik" of Melanchthon himself, with new textbooks for the prestigious "princely schools" covering both disciplines, just as had already been done in respect of "grammar" and the old Aelius Donatus "Ars grammatica". There was a widespread sense that the old texts no longer matched up to young peoples' learning needs.

But as the new century progressed Martini found himself increasingly drawn back to Theology. In 1613 he took on the professorship for Ethics, and in 1615, with the permission of the elector, he was able to start working towards a Theology Licentiate, receiving his doctorate in 1623. He then accepted a professorship in the Theology faculty. In 1627 he was promoted to the position of Provost at the Castle Church ("Schlosskirche"), which was closely associated with the Saxon ruling family. After Jakob Martini died on 30 May 1649 his body was buried, on 7 June 1649, at the Castle Church. His life-sized tomb stone survives.

== Family ==
Jakob Martini was married twice. His first marriage was to Agnes Ohrlaub. Her father, Andreas Ohrlaub, was a mayor of Berenburg The marriage to Agnes lasted nineteen years and is known to have produced five sons and four daughters. Agnes had evidently died by 1619 which is when, on 6 July, Jakob Martini married Magdalena Sturm, another mayor's daughter, this time from Köthen, a more substantial town. This marriage is known to have produced three more sons and three more daughters. Magdalena was probably younger than her husband since she died only in 1663.

== Works (selection) ==
- Logicae peripateticae libri II, 1603, 16227; Exercitationes metaphysicarum libri II (1603/4), 1608, 1624
- Disputationes ethicae, 1605
- Oratio de utilitate et necessitudine logices, 1606
- Disputationes logicae domesticae 1606, 1608
- Exercitationes nobiles de anima, 1606
- Disputationum logicarum publicarum decas, 1607
- Quaestiones illustres philosophicae, 1607
- De communicatione proprii contra Barth. Keckermannum, 1609
- Themata decem contra systema logicum Keckermannianum, 1610
- Institutionum logicarum libri VII, 1610, 1674
- Partitiones et quaestiones metaphysicae 1611, 1615
- Collegium metaphysicum, 1614
- Disputationes physicae, 1617
- Disputationes metaphysicae, 1619
- Discussionum ramistarum libri II, 1623.
