= Pegnesischer Blumenorden =

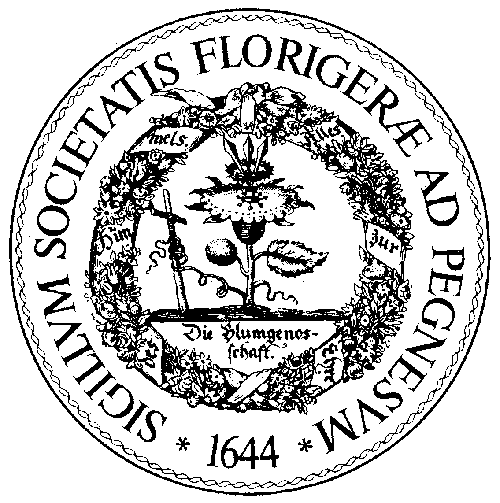
Seal of the Pegnesischer Blumenorden

The Pegnesischer Blumenorden (English: Pegnitz Flower Society; Latin: Societas Florigera ad Pegnesum; abbr. P.Bl.O.) is a German literary society that was founded in Nuremberg in 1644. It is the sole Baroque literary society that remains active today. The name derived from the river Pegnitz, which flows through Nuremberg.

== History ==
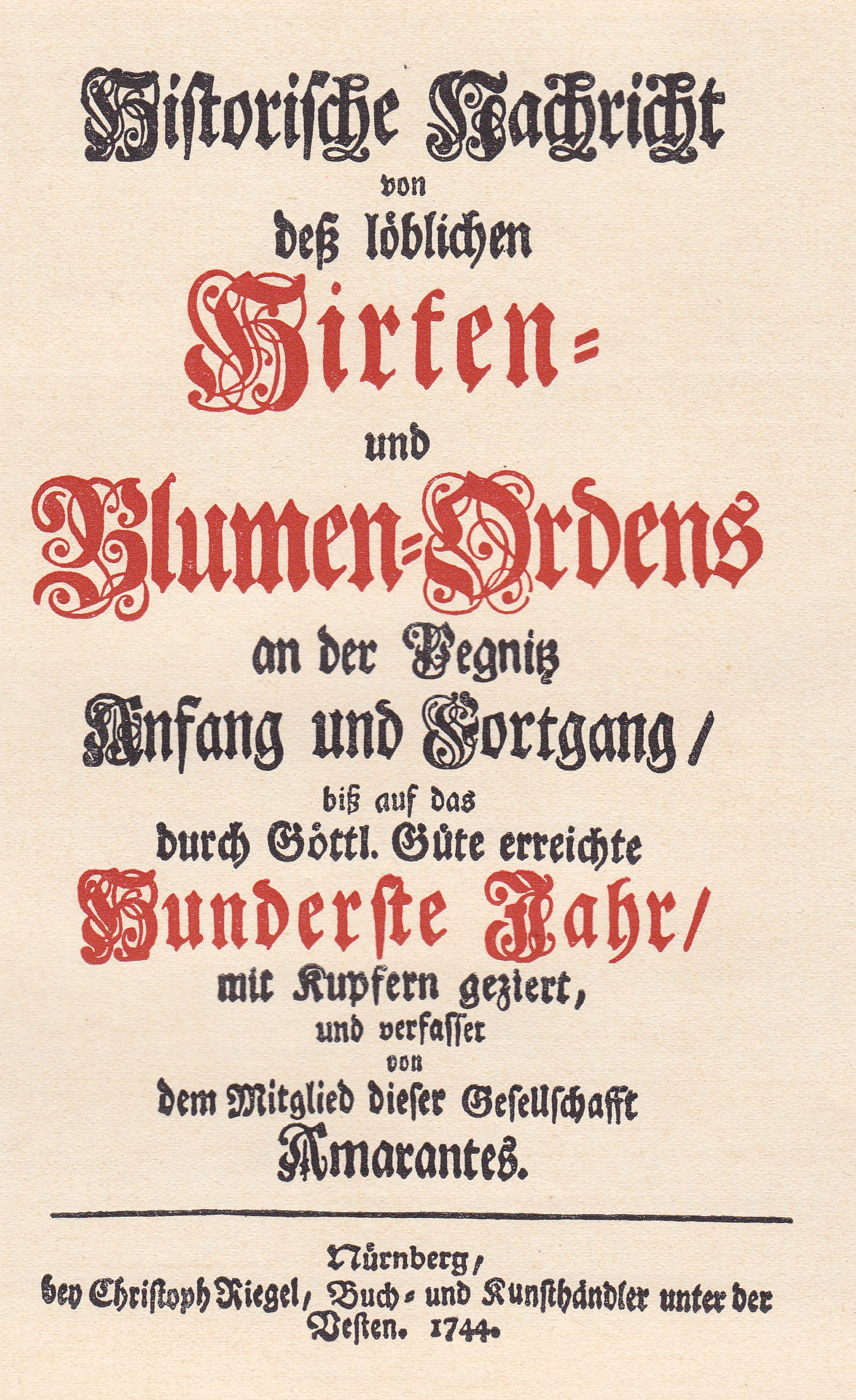
Cover of the society's periodical, centennial edition (1744)

The Society was founded in 1644 by the poets Georg Philipp Harsdörffer and Johann Klaj on the model of the Fruchtbringende Gesellschaft (Fruitbearing Society). Members called themselves Pegnitzschäfer (Pegnitz shepherds). The stated goal of the society was the "support and improvement of German language and poetry."

After the deaths of Klaj and Harsdörffer (1656, 1658, resp.), Sigmund von Birken revived the Society and became its director until his death in 1681. Under his leadership a total of almost 60 new members were inducted. Unusually for the time, Birken also allowed women to join; a total of 14 did so. The best known among these was Maria Catharina Stockfleth (1634–1692).

The 1660s and 1670s saw the society at its most fertile; its members produced many pastorals in the style of Virgil and Opitz.

After Birken's death the Society began a slow decline. His successors Martin Limburger and Magnus Daniel Omeis were not especially successful in their attempt to promote and propagate the florid Baroque style in the 18th century, by which time the more structured neoclassical style had become the norm. Nevertheless, the society has continually maintained a membership of some sort, and remains active to this day.

== See also ==
- Irrhain
