= Striegistal =

- Municipality
- Coat of arms

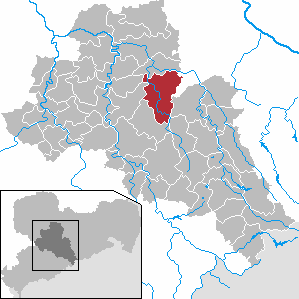
- Location of Striegistal within Mittelsachsen district
- Interactive map of Striegistal
- Location within Germany Location within Saxony
- Coordinates: 50°59′30″N 13°11′10″E
- Country: Germany
- State: Saxony
- District: Mittelsachsen
- Subdivisions: 6

Government
  - Mayor (2022–29): Bernd Wagner

Area
  - Total: 77.04 km^{2} (29.75 sq mi)
- Elevation: 240–373 m (787–1,224 ft)

Population (2025-12-31)
  - Total: 4,496
  - Density: 58.36/km^{2} (151.1/sq mi)
- Time zone: UTC+01:00 (CET)
  - Summer (DST): UTC+02:00 (CEST)
- Postal codes: 09661
- Dialling codes: 037207, 034322
- Vehicle registration: FG
- Website: www.striegistal.de

Striegistal is a municipality in the district of Mittelsachsen, in Saxony, Germany. In 1994, the unification of the former municipalities of Berbersdorf, Goßberg, Mobendorf and Pappendorf as part of the regional administrative reform, created the municipality of Striegistal. In 2008 it absorbed the former municipality Tiefenbach. It received its name from the two rivers that flow through the community, the Little Striegis and the Big Striegis.

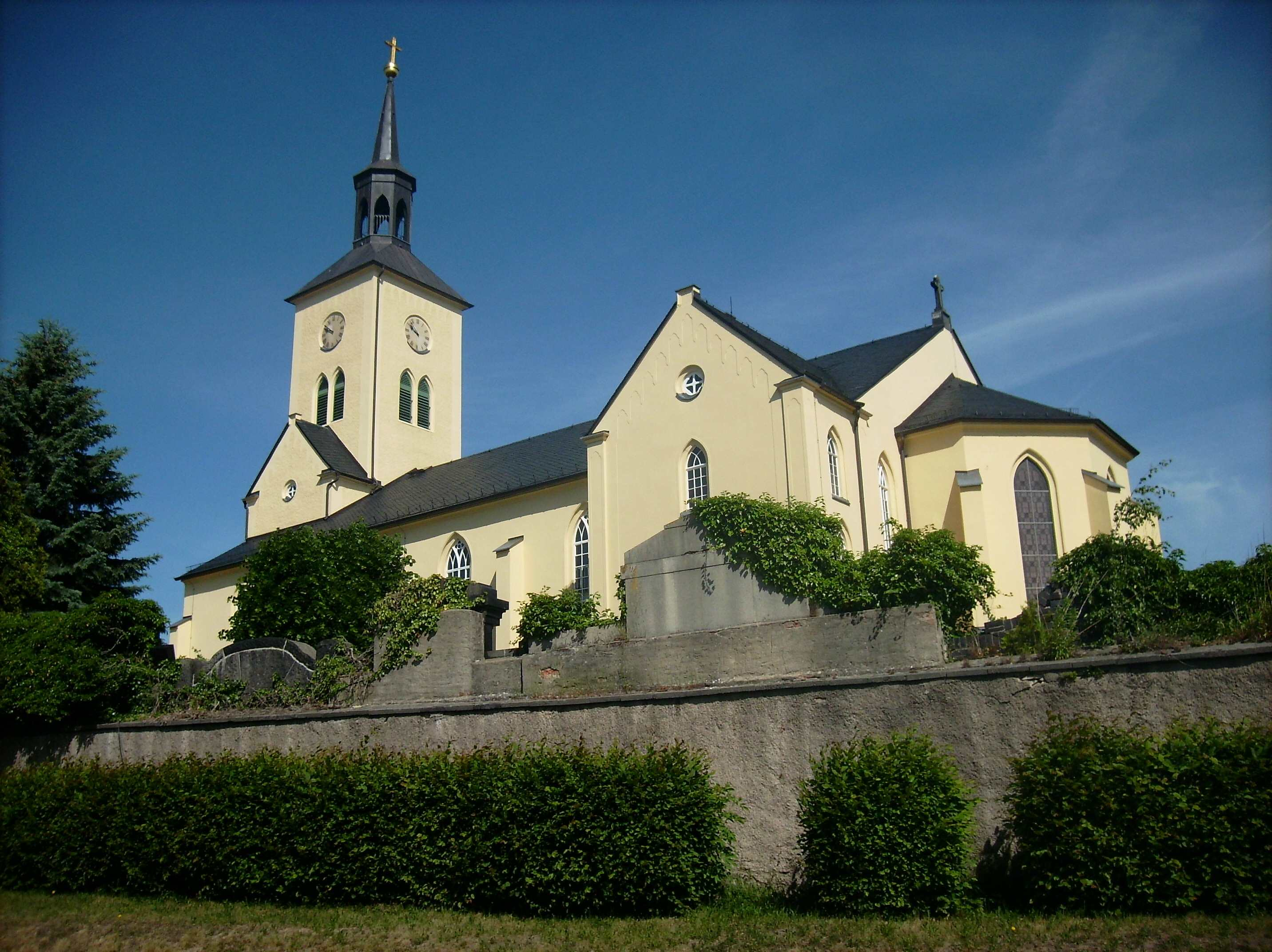
District Etzdorf church

== Sons and daughters of the community ==
- David Schirmer (1623-1686), lyricist of the baroque period.
- Wolfgang Schindler (1929-1991), classical archaeologist
- Martin Kröger (1894-1980), chemist and professor at the University of Leipzig
