= Georg Philipp Harsdörffer =

German jurist, poet, translator

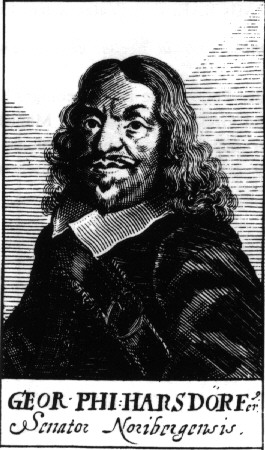
- Georg Philipp Harsdörffer
- Born: 1 November 1607; Fischbach (Nuremberg)
- Died: 17 September 1658 (aged 50); Nuremberg
- Education: Law
- Alma mater: University of Altdorf; University of Strassburg
- Occupations: Poet, jurist, encyclopedist
- Writing career
- Language: German, Latin
- Period: Baroque-era Germany
- Genres: Concrete and constrained poetry; treatise; literary criticism; sayings collection; libretto; translation
- Literary movement: German Baroque, Nuremberg Poetic School

Georg Philipp Harsdörffer (1 November 1607 – 17 September 1658) was a Jurist, Baroque-period German poet and translator.

== Life and career ==
Georg Philipp Harsdörffer was born in Nuremberg on 1 November 1607 into a patrician family. He studied law at Altdorf and Strassburg. He received a broad classical education in the home of his family before pursuing studies at the University of Strassburg where he studied under professor Matthias Bernegger. After completing his studies, he traveled through the Netherlands, England, France and Italy. While he was in Italy, he came into contact with members of learned academies. He shared his desire for reform in literary and linguistic for the improvement of moral and culture of the society.

Harsdörffer returned to Nuremberg in 1634. There he worked as a government assessor until 1655 when he was elected to the Nuremberg city council. During that time he became a vocal advocate for the purification of the German language. His knowledge of languages earned him the appellation "the learned." He was well-versed in contemporary French culture and literature. As an innovative poet, he was receptive to ideas from abroad. He is still known for his "Germanizations" of foreign-language terms. As a member of the Fruitbearing Society (Fruchtbringende Gesellschaft) he was called der Spielende (the player). In 1644 jointly with Johann Klaj he founded the Pegnesischer Blumenorden, a literary society, in Nuremberg. He was known by the name Strephon among the members of this order.

His writings in German and Latin fill fifty volumes, and a selection of his poems, which are mostly interesting for their form, can be found in Müller's Bibliothek deutscher Dichter des 17ten Jahrhunderts, vol. ix (Leipzig, 1826). Widmann (Altdorf, 1707) wrote a biography of him. His eight volume work, Frauenzimmer Gesprächspiele (published from 1641-1649) contains a variety of literary works by Harsdörffer. Some of these texts are important to German music history; including Harsdörffer's libretto to Seelewig which is the oldest surviving German-language opera. That opera used music by composer Sigmund Theophil Staden who also used Harsdörffer as his librettist for the musical pageant Tugendsterne. The text to this work is also contained in the Frauenzimmer Gesprächspiele.

In his Treatise to Protect the Work on the German Language (1644), he asserted that German ‘speaks with the tongues of nature.'

He was the father of Karl Gottlieb Harsdörffer (1637–1708).

== Selected works ==
- Frauenzimmer Gesprächspiele, 8 Bde. (1641–1649)
- Das geistlich Waldgedicht oder Freudenspiel, genant Seelewig (1644)
- Poetischer Trichter-die Teutsche Dicht- und Reimkunst ohne Behuf der lateinischen Sprache, in VI Stunden einzugießen (1647–1653)
- Hertzbewegliche Sonntagsandachten (1649–1652)
- Der Grosse Schau-Platz Jämmerlicher Mord-Geschichte (1649–1650)
- Der Grosse Schau-Platz Lust- und Lehr-reicher Geschichte (1650–1651)
- Nathan und Jotham (1650–1651)
- Ars Apophthegmatica, 2 Bde. (1655–1656)
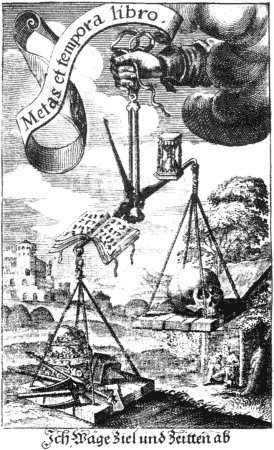
Emblem in his book Icones mortis
