= VD 16 =

The Verzeichnis der im deutschen Sprachbereich erschienenen Drucke des 16. Jahrhunderts (VD 16) (in English: Bibliography of Books Printed in the German Speaking Countries of the Sixteenth Century), abbreviated VD 16, is a project to make a retrospective German national bibliography for the sixteenth century. The project was compiled during the period 1969–1999. It is financed by the Deutsche Forschungsgemeinschaft (German Research Foundation).

There is a corresponding German national bibliography for the seventeenth century, known as VD 17. Together the VD 16 and VD 17 alongside the planned VD 18 (Verzeichnis der im deutschen Sprachraum erschienenen Drucke des 18. Jahrhunderts) fulfill a function for the bibliographic history of the German cultural zone similar to the English Short Title Catalogue for Britain and North America.

== See also ==
- Books in Germany
