= Wolfgang Ratke =

German educational reformer (1571–1635)

Wolfgang Ratke (also Wolfgangus Ratichius or Wolfgang Ratich) (18 October 1571 – 27 April 1635) was a German educational reformer.

== Biography ==
=== Early life ===
He was born at Wilster, Holstein, the son of Andreas Ratke who died early and Margarete Rost who died aged 66 on 19 May 1613. He was educated at the Gelehrtenschule des Johanneums and the University of Rostock.

=== System of education ===
While sojourning in Holland (1603–11), he devised a new method for teaching languages quickly. His system of education was based upon Francis Bacon's philosophy, the principle being that of proceeding from things to names, from the particular to the general, and from the mother tongue to foreign languages. His fundamental idea was that the Baconian theory of induction was following nature, meaning that there is a natural sequence along which the mind moves in the acquisition of knowledge, through particulars to the general. He advocated, above all, the use of the vernacular as the proper means for approaching all subjects, and demanded the establishment of a vernacular school on the basis of the Latin school.

=== Implementation efforts ===
He tried to enlist the Prince of Orange in his cause, but failing, he went to Germany. In 1618 he opened schools at Augsburg and elsewhere. In Köthen, Prince Ludwig von Anhalt furnished him with the means of opening a school to be conducted according to his own ideas; however, difficulties with the clergy led to his imprisonment for eight months. After starting another school at Magdeburg in 1620, which failed, he became a wanderer. In addition to Augsburg and Köthen, he put his method of instruction into operation in Amsterdam, Basel, Strassburg, Frankfurt, Weimar, and various other places.

His ideas were advanced for his time, but he lacked executive ability, and his personality alienated both assistants and patrons. His influence upon his contemporaries and posterity was much greater than would be supposed from the failure of his own attempts to put his plan in practice. His work was overshadowed by that of the more successful Comenius. He died at Erfurt in 1635.

== Bibliography ==
- Barnard, German Teachers and Educators (Hartford, 1878)
- Quick, Educational Reformers (New York, 1890)
- G. Vogt, Wolfgang Ratichius, der Vorgänger des Amos Comenius (Langensalza, 1894)
