= Johann Klaj =

German poet (1616–1656)

Johann Klaj (Latinized Clajus) (1616 – 16 February 1656) was a German poet.

He was born at Meissen in Saxony. After studying theology at University of Leipzig, Wittenberg, he went to Nuremberg as a "candidate for holy orders," and there, in conjunction with Georg Philipp Harsdörffer, founded in 1644 the literary society known as the Pegnitz order. This references Julius Tittmann, Die Nürnberger Dichterschule (Göttingen, 1847).

In 1647 he received an appointment as master in the Sebaldus school in Nuremberg, and in 1650 became preacher at Kitzingen, where he died in 1656. Klaj's poems consist of dramas, written in stilted language and redundant with adventures, among which are Höllen- und Himmelfahrt Christi (Nuremberg, 1644), and Herodes, der Kindermörder (Nuremberg, 1645), and a poem, written jointly with Harsdörffer, Pegnesische Schäfergedicht (1644), which gives in allegorical form the story of his settlement in Nuremberg.
