= Philipp von Zesen =

German poet, hymnist and writer

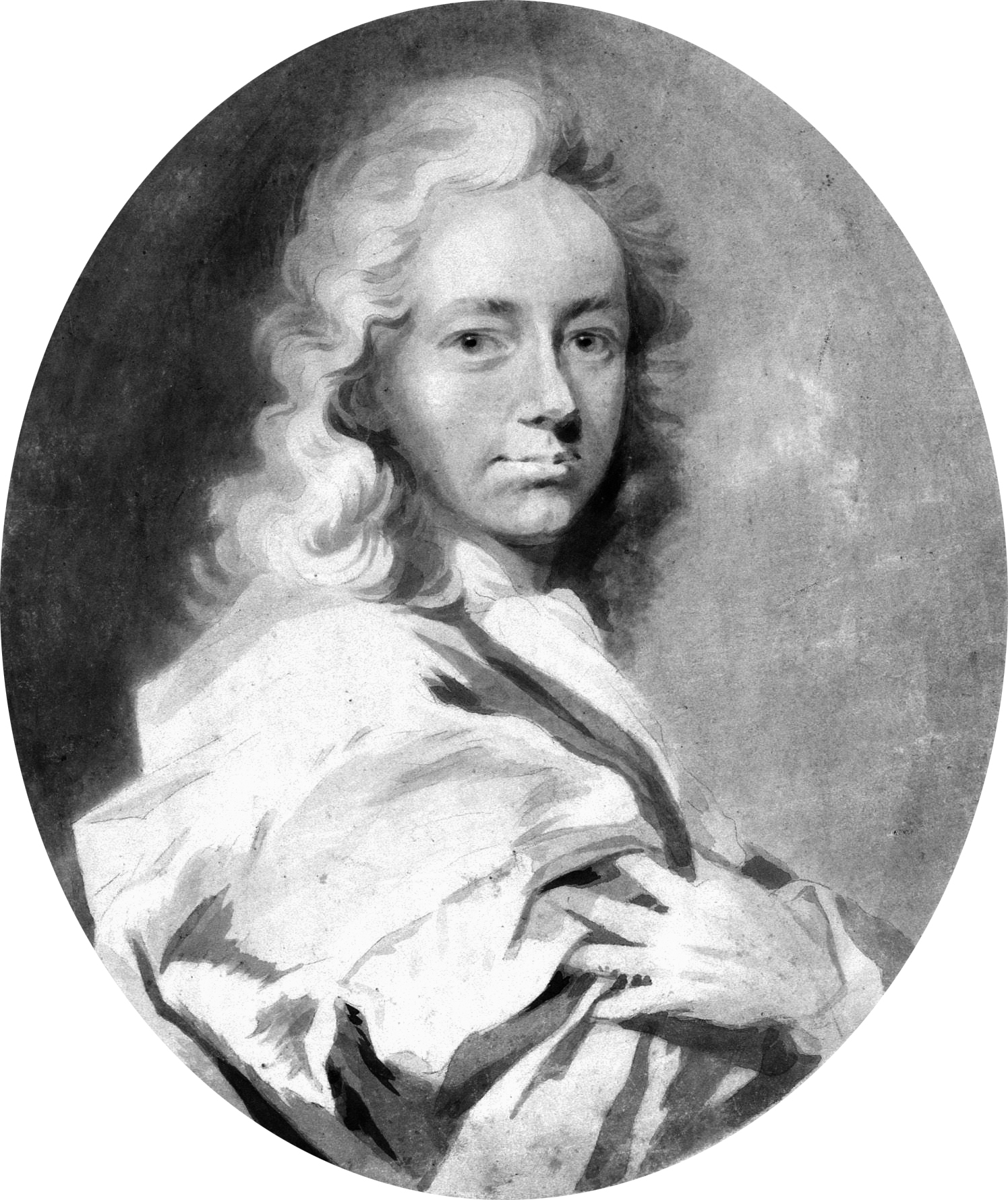
Philipp von Zesen

Philipp von Zesen, also Filip Cösius or Caesius (originally Ph. Caesien, Filip Zesen, Filip von Zesen, in Latin Philippus Caesius à Fürstenau, Philippus Caesius à Zesen) (8 October 1619 O.S. – 13 November 1689 O.S.) was a German poet, hymnist and writer. Some of his works are published under his pen name Ritterhold von Blauen.

== Biography ==
Von Zesen was born in Priorau near Dessau. From 1639 to 1641 he studied rhetorics and poetry at the University of Wittenberg. During the war years from 1642 to 1648 von Zesen lived in the Dutch Republic working as a translator. In 1648 he returned to his hometown of Priorau and was accepted to the Fruitbearing Society in 1649. From 1656 he worked in the Dutch Republic again, being a major contributor to Elsevier publishing company. When he married Maria Becker in 1672 he moved to Hamburg where he spent the rest of his life.

== Style ==
Although his purist language found many opponents, a number of the neologisms he coined are still in use in the German language today, co-existing with loanwords he sought to replace. Examples include "Abstand" for "Distanz" (distance), "Leidenschaft" for "Passion" (passion), or "Rechtschreibung" for "Orthographie" (orthography).

Other more native words he promoted include: Angelpunkt (Pol), Anschrift (Adresse), Ausflug (Exkursion), Beifügung (Apposition), Beistrich (Komma), Besprechung (Rezension), Blutzeuge (Märtyrer), Bücherei (Bibliothek), Emporkömmling (Parvenü), Entwurf (Projekt), Farbgebung (Kolorit), Freistaat (Republik), Gesichtskreis (Horizont, Panorama), Glaubensbekenntnis (Credo), Gotteshaus (Tempel), Grundstein (Fundament), Kreislauf (Zirkulation), Letzter Wille (Testament), Mundart (Dialekt), Nachruf (Nekrolog), Sinngedicht (Epigramm), Sterblichkeit (Mortalität), Verfasser (Autor), Vollmacht (Plenipotenz), Wahlspruch (Devise), Weltall (Universum).

== Selected works ==
- Melpomene (1638)
- Deutscher Helicon (1640)
- Himmlische Kleio (1641)
- FrühlingsLust oder Lob-, Lust- und Liebeslieder (1642)
- Poetischer Rosen-Wälder Vorschmack (1642), Pastoral
- Hooch-Deutsche Spraachübrung (1643)
- Liebesbeschreibung Lysanders und Kalisten (1644), translation of Vital d'Audiguier's Lysandre et Caliste
- Die Adriatische Rosemund (1645)
- Lustinne (1645)
- Die afrikanische Sofonisbe (1646)
- Kurze gründl. Anleitung zur Höflichkeit (1649)
- Leo Belgicus (1656)
- Coelum Astronomico-Poeticum (1662)
- Beschreibung der Stadt Amsterdam (Description of Amsterdam) (1664)
- Schöne Hamburgerin (1668) Songs
- Assenat (1670)
- Reiselieder (1677)
- Simson (1679)
