= VD 17 =

The Verzeichnis der im deutschen Sprachraum erschienenen Drucke des 17. Jahrhunderts (in English: Bibliography of Books Printed in the German Speaking Countries from 1601 to 1700), abbreviated VD17, is a project to make a retrospective German national bibliography for the 17th century. The project was initiated in 1996 and planned to continue for 10–12 years. It is financed by the Deutsche Forschungsgemeinschaft (German Research Foundation). As of early 2007, the database contains more than 250,000 titles.

There is a corresponding German national bibliography for the 16th century, known as VD 16, which was compiled during the period 1969-1999, and another for the 18th century is planned.

== See also ==
- Books in Germany
