= Germany in the early modern period =

Map of the empire following the Peace of Westphalia in 1648

The German-speaking states of the early modern period (c. 1500–1800) were divided politically and religiously. Religious tensions between the states comprising the Holy Roman Empire had existed during the preceding period of the Late Middle Ages (c. 1250–1500), notably erupting in Bohemia with the Hussite Wars (1419–1434). The defining religious movement of this period, the Reformation, led to unprecedented levels of violence and political upheaval for the region.

Usually considered to have begun with the publication of the Ninety-five Theses (1517) by Martin Luther in the city of Wittenberg (then within the Electorate of Saxony, now located within the modern German state of Saxony-Anhalt), the progression of the Reformation would divide the German states among new religious lines: the north, the east, and many of the major cities—Strasbourg, Frankfurt, and Nuremberg—becoming Protestant while the southern and western regions largely remained Catholic. Compromises and reforms would be made in an effort to promote internal stability within the Holy Roman Empire, importantly with the Peace of Augsburg in 1555, but these efforts would ultimately fall short and culminate in one of the most destructive conflicts the European continent had yet seen, the Thirty Years' War (1618–1648), which ended with the adoption of the Peace of Westphalia.

This period also saw the emergence of the Kingdom of Prussia as the primary competitor to the previously hegemonic Habsburg monarchy. After the close of early modern period in Europe following the Age of Enlightenment and the dissolution of the Holy Roman Empire in 1806 during the Napoleonic Wars, this Austro-Prussian rivalry would prove to be the driving internal force behind the unification of Germany in 1871.

== The 16th century ==
=== German Renaissance ===
L'Empire d'Allemagne by Nicolas de Fer, 1710

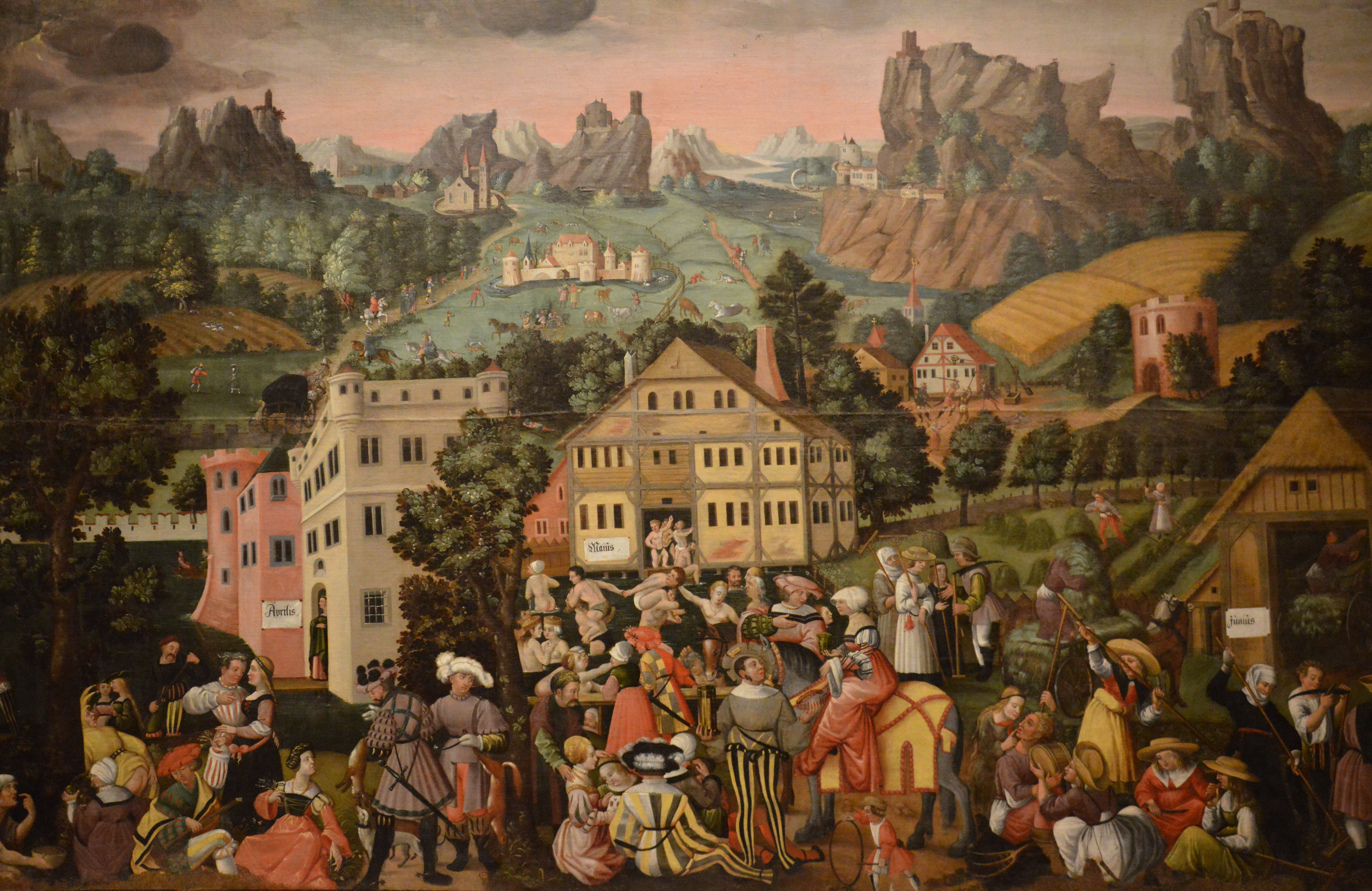
Augsburg in the early 16th century, by Jörg Breu the Elder

The German Renaissance, part of the Northern Renaissance, was a cultural and artistic movement that spread among German thinkers in the 15th and 16th centuries, which originated with the Italian Renaissance in Italy. This was a result of German artists who had traveled to Italy to learn more and become inspired by the Renaissance movement. Many areas of the arts and sciences were influenced, notably by the spread of humanism to the various German states and principalities. There were many advances made in the development of new techniques in the fields of architecture, the arts, and the sciences. This also marked the time within Germany of a rise of power, independent city states, and spread of Franciscan humanism.

=== German Reformation ===
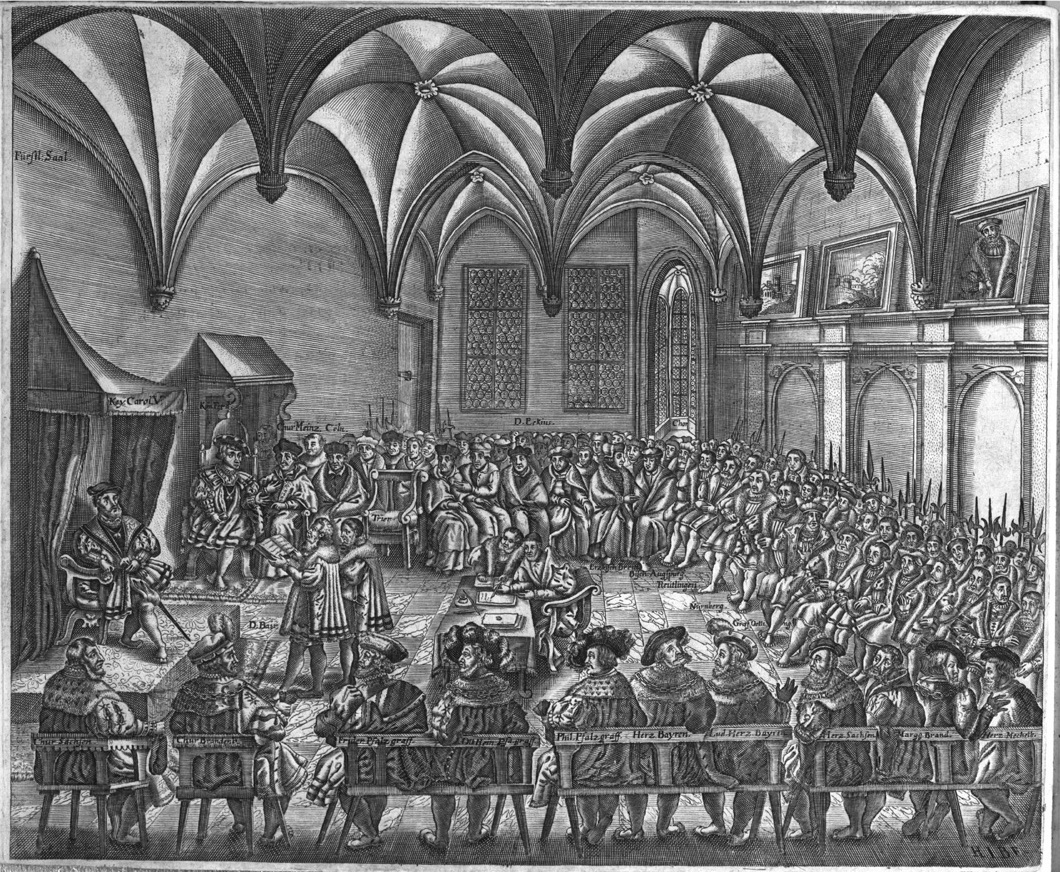
Charles V, Holy Roman Emperor receives the Augsburg Confession, Augsburg, 1530

The German Reformation initiated by Martin Luther led to the German Peasants' War in 1524–1525. Luther, along with his colleague Philipp Melanchthon, emphasized this point in his plea for the Reformation at the Imperial Diet of 1529 amid charges of heresy, but the edict by the Diet of Worms (1521) prohibited all innovations. With efforts to be understood as Catholic reformer as opposed to a heretical revolutionary, and to appeal to German princes with his religious condemnation of the peasant revolts backed up by the Doctrine of the Two Kingdoms, Luther's growing conservatism would provoke more radical reformers. At a religious conference with the Zwinglians in 1529, Melanchthon joined with Luther in opposing a union with Zwingli. With the protestation of the Lutheran princes at the Diet of Speyer (1529) and rejection of the Lutheran "Augsburg Confession" at Augsburg (1530), a separate Lutheran church finally emerged.

In Northern Europe, Luther appealed to the growing national consciousness of the German states because he denounced the Pope for involvement in politics as well as religion. Moreover, he backed the nobility, which was now justified to crush the Great Peasant Revolt of 1525 and to confiscate church property by Luther's Doctrine of the Two Kingdoms. This explains the attraction of some territorial princes to Lutheranism. However, the Elector of Brandenburg, Joachim I, blamed Lutheranism for the revolt and so did others. In Brandenburg, it was only under his successor Joachim II that Lutheranism was established, and the old religion was not formally extinct in Brandenburg until the death of the last Catholic bishop there, Georg von Blumenthal, who was Bishop of Lebus and sovereign Prince-Bishop of Ratzeburg.

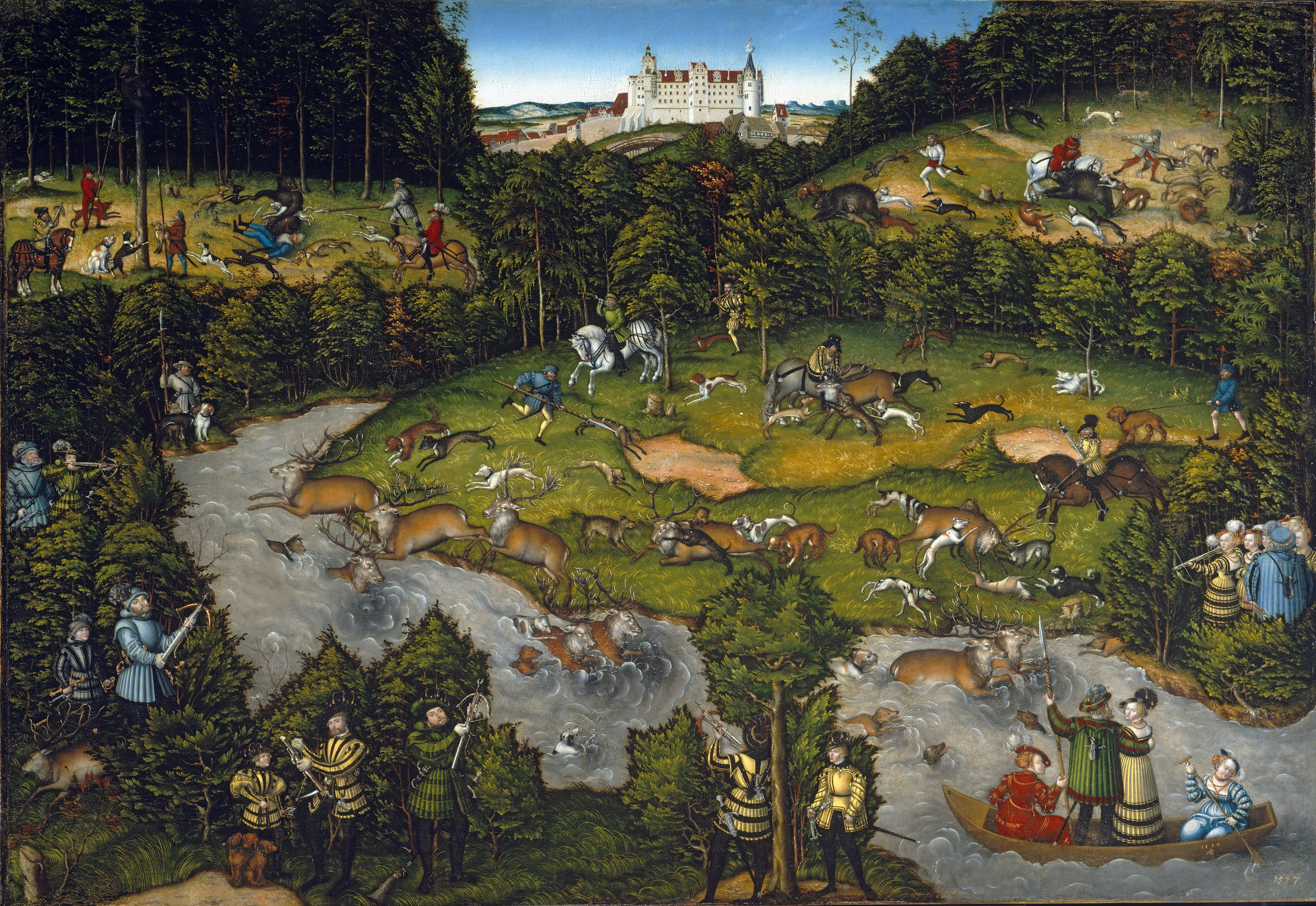
Hunting near Hartenfels castle, by Lucas Cranach the Elder, 1540

Although Charles V fought the Reformation, it is no coincidence either that the reign of his nationalistic predecessor Maximilian I saw the beginning of the Reformation. While the centralized states of western Europe had reached accords with the Vatican permitting them to draw on the rich property of the church for government expenditures, enabling them to form state churches that were greatly autonomous of Rome, similar moves on behalf of the Empire were unsuccessful so long as princes and prince bishops fought reforms to drop the pretension of the secular universal empire.

=== The printing press and literacy ===
The Reformation and printing press combined to mark a major breakthrough in the spread of literacy. From 1517 onward religious pamphlets flooded Germany and much of Europe. By 1530, over 10,000 publications are known, with a total of ten million copies. The Reformation was thus a media revolution. Luther strengthened his attacks on Rome by depicting a "good" against "bad" church. From there, it became clear that print could be used for propaganda in the Reformation for particular agendas. Reformist writers used pre-Reformation styles, clichés, and stereotypes and changed items as needed for their own purposes.

Illustrations in the newly translated Bible and in many tracts popularized Luther's ideas. Lucas Cranach the Elder (1472–1553), the great painter patronized by the electors of Wittenberg, was a close friend of Luther, and illustrated Luther's theology for a popular audience. He dramatized Luther's views on the relationship between the Old and New Testaments, while remaining mindful of Luther's careful distinctions about proper and improper uses of visual imagery.

== Baroque period and Thirty Years' War ==
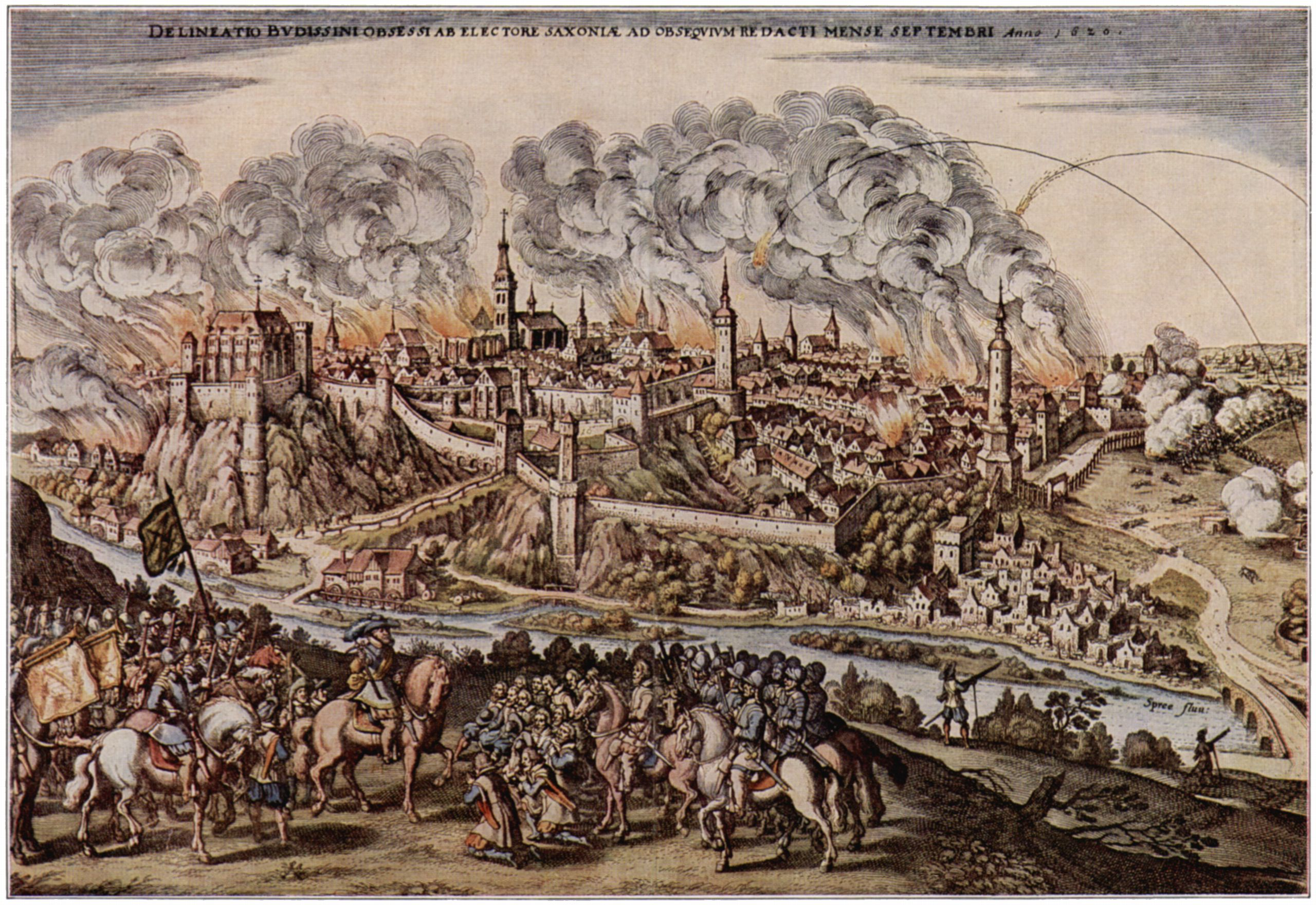
The siege and capture of Bautzen by John George I, Elector of Saxony, in September 1620

The Thirty Years' War (1618–1648) was a religious war principally fought in Germany, where it involved most of the European powers. The conflict began between Protestants and Catholics in the Holy Roman Empire, but gradually developed into a general, political war involving most of Europe. The Thirty Years' War was a continuation of the France-Habsburg rivalry for European political pre-eminence, and in turn led to further warfare between France and the Habsburg powers.

The major impact of the Thirty Years' War, fought mostly by mercenary armies, was the extensive destruction of entire regions, denuded by the foraging armies. Episodes of famine and disease significantly decreased the populace of the German states and the Low Countries and Italy, while bankrupting most of the combatant powers. Some of the quarrels that provoked the war went unresolved for a much longer time. The Thirty Years' War was ended with the Peace of Westphalia.

The Baroque period (1600 to 1720) was one of the most fertile times in German literature. Many writers reflected the horrible experiences of the Thirty Years' War, in poetry and prose. Grimmelshausen's adventures of the young and naïve Simplicissimus, in the eponymous book Simplicius Simplicissimus, became the most famous novel of the Baroque period. Andreas Gryphius and Daniel Caspar von Lohenstein wrote German language tragedies, or Trauerspiele, often on Classical themes and frequently quite violent. Erotic, religious and occasional poetry appeared in both German and Latin.

== Rise of Prussia and the end of the Holy Roman Empire ==
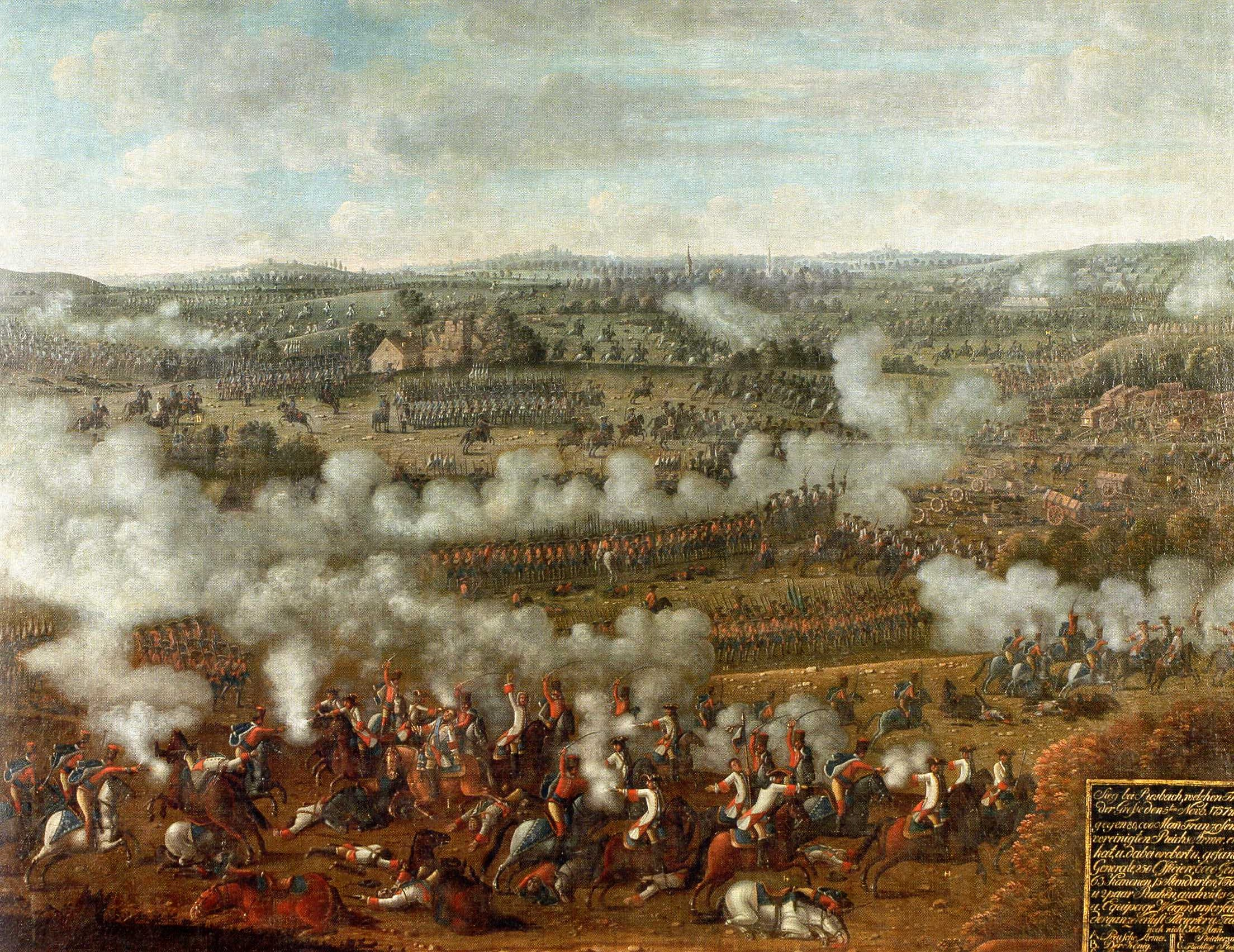
Battle of Rossbach in Saxony during the Seven Years' War, 1757

The 18th century saw the ascendancy of the Kingdom of Prussia and the outbreak of the Napoleonic Wars which lead to the final dissolution of the Holy Roman Empire in 1806.

=== Silesia ===
When Emperor Charles VI failed to produce a male heir, he bequeathed lands to his daughter Maria Theresa by the "Pragmatic sanction" of 1713. After his death in 1740 the Prussian king Frederick the Great attacked Austria and invaded Silesia in the First Silesian War (1740–1742). Austria lost and in the Treaty of Berlin (1742) Prussia acquired nearly all of Silesia. Prussia's victory weakened Austria's prestige and Maria Theresa, and gave Prussia an effective equality with Austria within the Holy Roman Empire" for the next century.

=== French Revolutionary Wars and final dissolution of the Holy Roman Empire ===
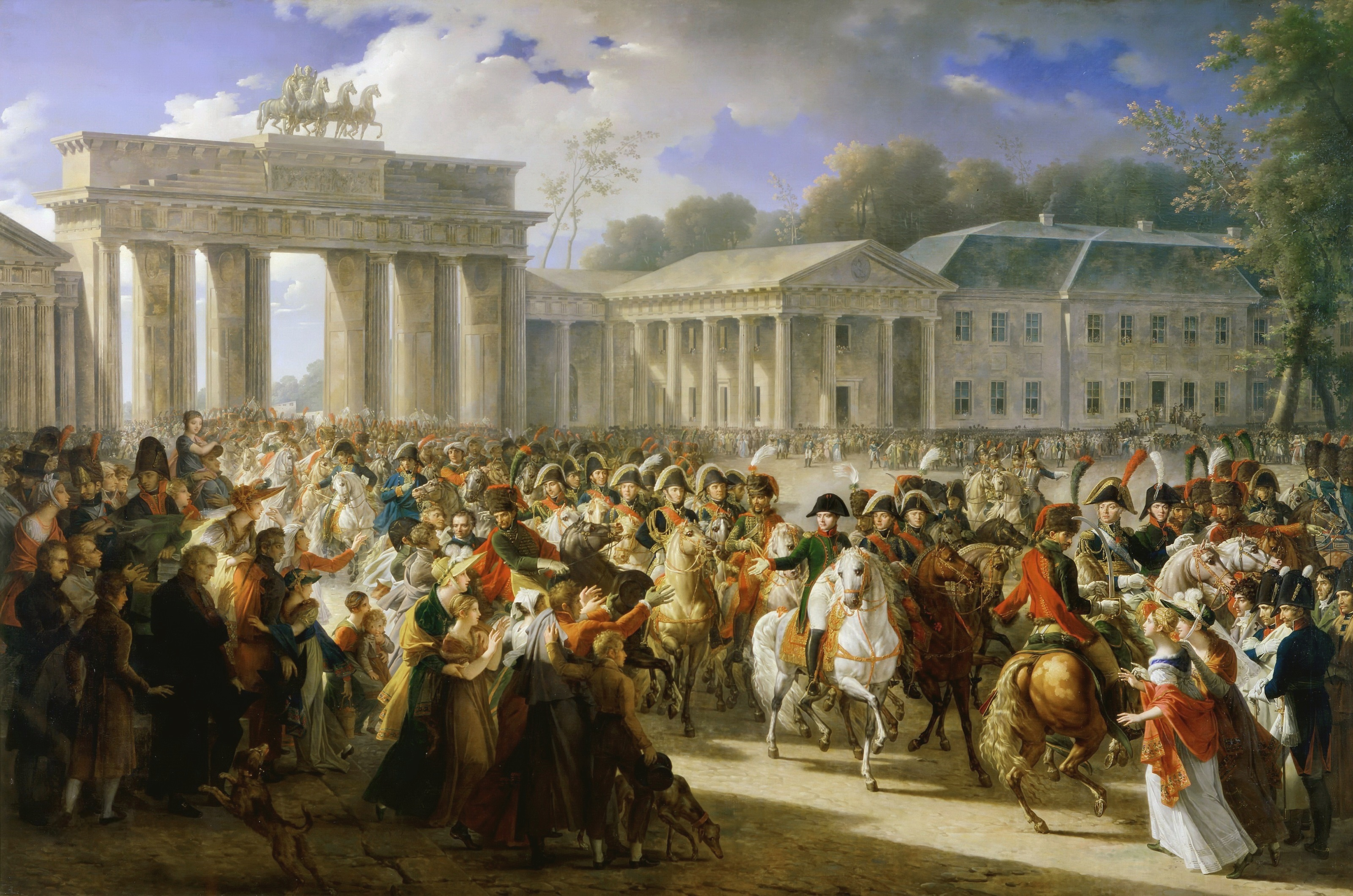
After defeating Prussian forces at Jena, Napoleon entered Berlin on 27 October 1806

From 1792 onwards, revolutionary France was at war with various parts of the Empire intermittently. The German Mediatisation was the series of mediatisations and secularisations that occurred in 1795–1814, during the latter part of the era of the French Revolution and then the Napoleonic Era.

Mediatisation was the process of annexing the lands of one sovereign monarchy to another, often leaving the annexed some rights. Secularisation was the redistribution to secular states of the secular lands held by an ecclesiastical ruler such as a bishop or an abbot.

The Empire was formally dissolved on 6 August 1806 when the last Holy Roman Emperor Francis II (from 1804, Emperor Francis I of Austria) abdicated, following a military defeat by the French under Napoleon (see Treaty of Pressburg). Napoleon reorganized much of the Empire into the Confederation of the Rhine, a French satellite. Francis' House of Habsburg-Lorraine survived the demise of the Empire, continuing to reign as Emperors of Austria and Kings of Hungary until the Habsburg empire's final dissolution in 1918 in the aftermath of World War I.

The Napoleonic Confederation of the Rhine was replaced by a new union, the German Confederation, in 1815, following the end of the Napoleonic Wars. It lasted until 1866 when Prussia founded the North German Confederation, a forerunner of the German Empire which united the German-speaking territories outside of Austria and Switzerland under Prussian leadership in 1871. This later served as the predecessor-state of modern Germany.

== Science and philosophy ==
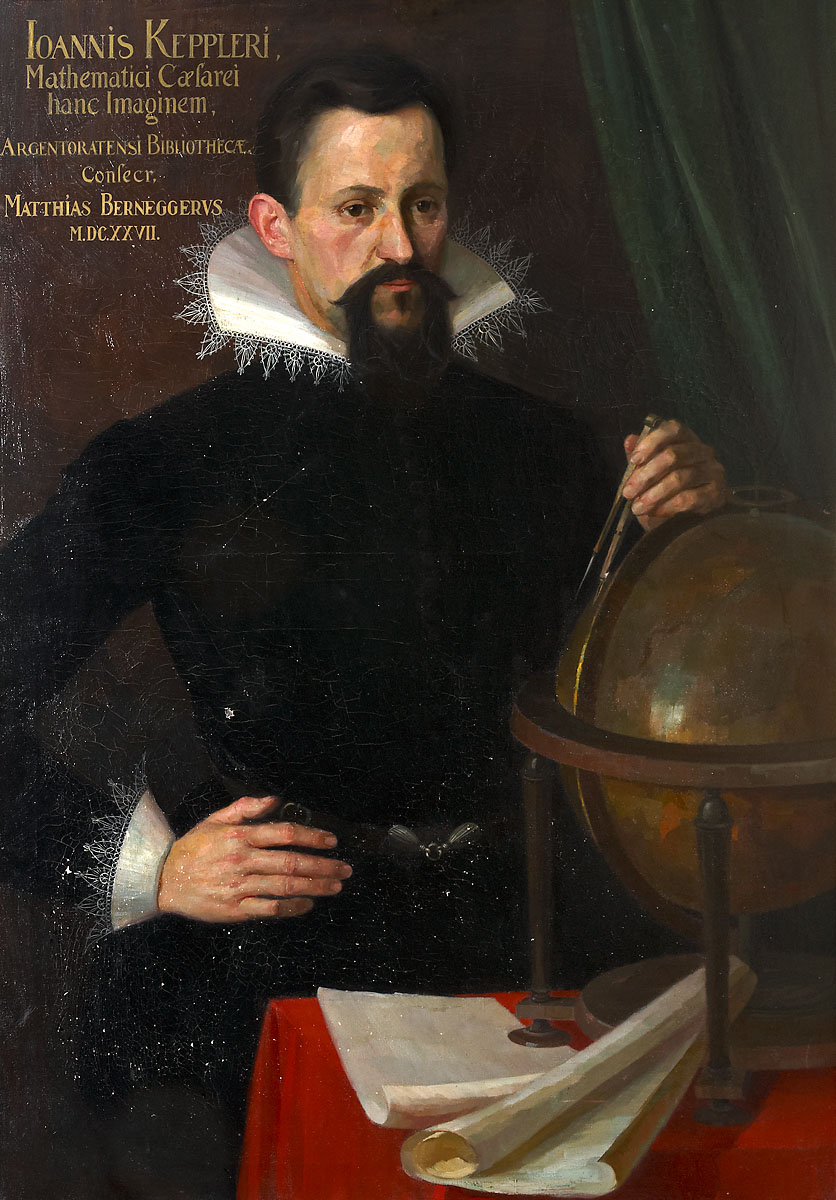
Portrait of Johannes Kepler

- Heinrich Cornelius Agrippa (1486–1535)
- Paracelsus (1493–1541)
- Georg Pictorius (c. 1500-1569)
- Johann Weyer (1516–1588)
- Judah Loew ben Bezalel (1525–1609)
- Jan Baptist van Helmont (1577–1644)
- Franz Kessler (1580–1650)
- Otto von Guericke (1602–1686)
- Adrian von Mynsicht (1603–1638)
- Johann Friedrich Schweitzer (1625–1709)
- Gottfried Leibniz (1646–1716)
- Christian Thomasius (1655–1728)
- Christian Wolff (1679–1754)
- Hermann Samuel Reimarus (1694–1768)
- Johann Christoph Gottsched (1700–1766)
- Leonhard Euler (1707–1783)
- Christian August Crusius (1715–1775)
- Johann Bernhard Basedow (1723–1790)
- Immanuel Kant (1724–1804)
- Johann Heinrich Lambert (1728–1777)
- Gotthold Ephraim Lessing (1729–1781)
- Moses Mendelssohn (1729–1786)
- Johann Georg Hamann (1730–1788)
- Johannes Nikolaus Tetens (1736–1807)
- Thomas Abbt (1738–1766)
- Johann Augustus Eberhard (1739–1809)
- Friedrich Heinrich Jacobi (1743–1819)
- Johann Gottfried von Herder (1744–1803)
- Johann Wolfgang von Goethe (1749–1832)

== List of emperors ==
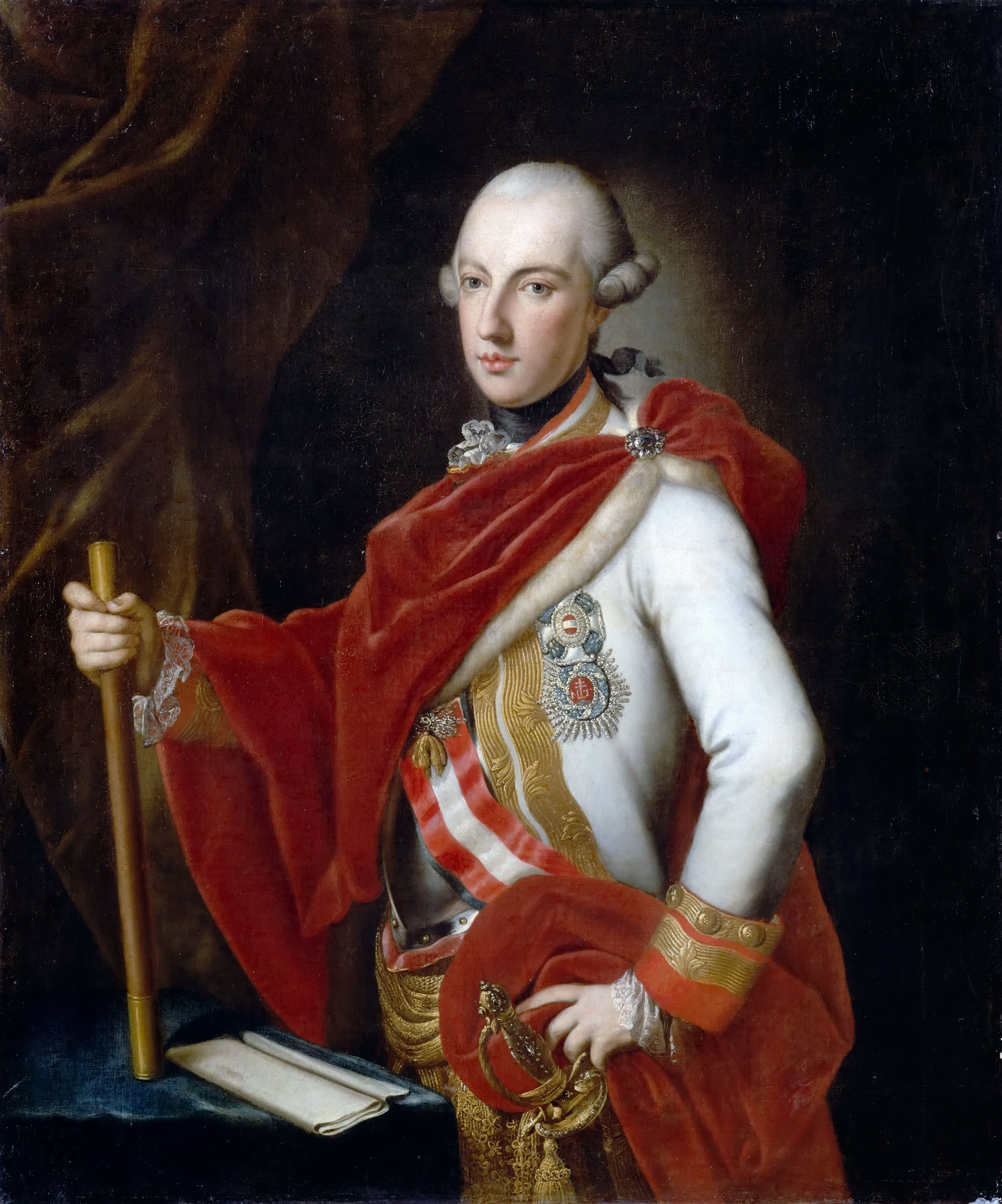
Joseph II, Holy Roman Emperor

Early modern Holy Roman Emperors:

- Maximilian I, 1508–1519
- Charles V, 1530–1556 (emperor-elect 1519–1530)
- Ferdinand I, 1558-1564
- Maximilian II, 1564–1576
- Rudolf II, 1576–1612 (enumerated as successor of Rudolf I who was German King 1273–1291 but not Emperor)
- Matthias, 1612–1619
- Ferdinand II, 1619–1637
- Ferdinand III, 1637–1657
- Leopold I, 1658–1705
- Joseph I, 1705–1711
- Charles VI, 1711–1740
- Charles VII Albert, 1742–1745 (House of Wittelsbach)
- Francis I, 1745–1765 (House of Lorraine)
- Joseph II, 1765–1790
- Leopold II, 1790–1792
- Francis II, 1792–1806

== See also ==
- Early Modern High German
- Baroque period German literature
- 18th-century German literature
- Brandenburg-Prussia
- House of Hohenzollern
- Electorate of Bavaria
- Kingdom of Bohemia (1526–1648)
- Kingdom of Bohemia (1648–1867)
- Dutch Republic
- Early Modern Switzerland
- Royal Hungary (1541–1699)
- Croatia in the Habsburg Empire
