= List of poetry groups and movements =

Poetry groups and movements or schools may be self-identified by the poets that form them or defined by critics who see unifying characteristics of a body of work by more than one poet. To be a 'school', a group of poets must share a common style or a common ethos. A commonality of form is not in itself sufficient to define a school; for example, Edward Lear, George du Maurier and Ogden Nash do not form a school simply because they all wrote limericks.

There are many different 'schools' of poetry. Some of them are described below in approximate chronological sequence. The subheadings indicate broadly the century in which a style arose.

== Prehistoric ==
The oral tradition is too broad to be a strict school but it is a useful grouping of works whose origins either predate writing, or belong to cultures without writing.

== Second century BC (100-200BC) ==
China: Zenith of Han poetry, a movement away from the ancient Chinese poetry of the Classic of Poetry and the Chu Ci.

== Third century (200–300) ==
China: Jian'an poetry, a poetic movement occurring during the end of the Han dynasty, in the state of Cao Wei.

China: Seven Sages of the Bamboo Grove, a group of poets active during the late Cao Wei to early Jin dynasty era, poets incorporating the Wei-Jin Xuanxue movement.

China: Start of Six Dynasties poetry (220–589).

== Fourth century (300–400) ==
China: Six Dynasties poetry period (220–589).

China: Emergence of Midnight Songs poetry.

China: Orchid Pavilion Gathering of 353, which led to the publication of the Lantingji Xu and the related movement in Classical Chinese poetry.

== Fifth century (400–500) ==
China: Six Dynasties poetry period (220–589).

China: Emergence of Yongming poetry (483-93) within the state of Southern Qi, a major movement within Classical Chinese poetry.

== Sixth century (500–600) ==
China: End of the Six Dynasties poetry period (220–589).

China: Emergence of the brief Sui poetry movement of the Sui dynasty (581–618).

== Seventh century (600–700) ==
China: Emergence of Tang poetry (618–907), and the Early Tang (初唐) and High Tang (盛唐) movements.

== Eighth century (700–800) ==
China: Period of Tang poetry (618–907), and the zenith of the High Tang (盛唐) movement, leading into the Middle Tang (中唐) movement.

== Ninth century (800–900) ==
China: Period of Tang poetry (618–907), and the end of the Middle Tang (中唐) movement, leading into the Late Tang (晚唐) movement.

== Tenth century (900–1000) ==
China: Emergence of Song poetry (960–1279).

== Twelfth century (1100–1200) ==
China: Emergence of Yuan poetry (1271–1368).

== Thirteenth century (1200–1300) ==
The Sicilian School was a small community of Sicilian and mainland Italian poets between 1230 and 1266 headed by Giacomo da Lentini.

== Fourteenth century (1300–1400) ==
China: Emergence of Ming poetry (1368–1644).

The Renaissance poetry within the Renaissance literature is a wide movement which arose in the 14th-century Italy—Petrarch is the most important representative—and continued until the mid-17th century in England.

== Fifteenth century (1400–1500) ==
The Makars or Scottish Chaucerians were a diverse genere of Scottish court poets who wrote in Middle Scots during the 15th and 16th century Northern Renaissance. The most important representatives are Robert Henryson, Walter Kennedy, William Dunbar, Gavin Douglas, David Lyndsay, and Alexander Montgomerie. Figures such as William Drummond of Hawthornden wrote in English might loosely be seen as forming a continuation into the 17th century.

== Sixteenth century (1500–1600) ==
Mannerism was a movement and style that emerged in the later Italian High Renaissance. Mannerism in poetry is notable for its elegant, highly florid style and intellectual sophistication. The style involved poetry of Michelangelo, Clément Marot, Giovanni della Casa, Giovanni Battista Guarini, Torquato Tasso, Veronica Franco, and Miguel de Cervantes.

Petrarchism was a trans-European movement of Petrarch's style followers, partially coincident with Mannerism, including Pietro Bembo, Michelangelo, Mellin de Saint-Gelais, Vittoria Colonna, Clément Marot, Garcilaso de la Vega, Giovanni della Casa, Thomas Wyatt, Henry Howard, Joachim du Bellay, Edmund Spenser, Philip Sidney, and Bálint Balassi.

Grobianism is a particular movement in 16th-century German literature that parodied moralizing works and ridiculed in the most extreme caricatures the imitation of Romanesque fashions by gentle circles. The Grobianus Tischzucht (1538) and Friedrich Dedekind's Grobianus (1549) works give their name to Grobianism. The poet representatives include Sebastian Brant, Thomas Murner, Hans Sachs, Friedrich Dedekind, and Johann Fischart.

The Areopagus was a club dedicated to the reformation of English poetry. The club may have involved figures such as Edmund Spenser, Gabriel Harvey, Edward Dyer and Philip Sidney.

The Castalian Band was a court grouping of Scottish makars led by the King James VI. The group included Alexander Montgomerie, William Fowler, John Stewart of Baldynneis, William Alexander, Earl of Stirling, and others.

== Seventeenth century (1600–1700) ==
The Baroque poetry replaced Mannerism and includes several schools, especially most artificial poetic style of the early 17th-century. It involved Giambattista Marino, Lope de Vega, John Donne, Vincent Voiture, Pedro Calderón de la Barca, Georges de Scudéry, Georg Philipp Harsdörffer, John Milton, Andreas Gryphius, and Christian Hoffmann von Hoffmannswaldau.

Classical or Neoclassical poetry movement echoes the forms and values of classical ancient Greek and Latin literature, favouring formal, restrained forms. Major dramatist and other genres figures include Pierre Corneille, Molière, Jean Racine, John Dryden, William Wycherley, William Congreve, Joseph Addison, Friedrich Gottlieb Klopstock, and Gotthold Ephraim Lessing.

Marinism was Italian Baroque poetic school and techniques of Giambattista Marino and his followers was based on its use of extravagant and excessive extended metaphor and lavish descriptions. Among Giambattista Marino's followers were Cesare Rinaldi, Bartolomeo Tortoletti, Emanuele Tesauro, Francesco Pona, Francesco Maria Santinelli, and others.

Conceptismo was a Baroque poetic school in the Spanish literature, a similar to the Marinism. Major figures include Francisco de Quevedo and Baltasar Gracián.

Culteranismo was another Spanish Baroque movement, in contrast to Conceptismo, characterized by an ornamental, ostentatious vocabulary and a highly latinal syntax. It involved such poets as Luis de Góngora, Hortensio Félix Paravicino, Conde de Villamediana, and Juana Inés de la Cruz.

The Précieuses was a French Baroque movement, similar to the Spanish culteranismo. Its main features are the refined language of aristocratic salons, periphrases, hyperbole, and puns on the theme of gallant love. Poets associated with the Précieuses were Vincent Voiture, Charles Cotin, Antoine Godeau, and Isaac de Benserade.

Metaphysical poets was an English Baroque school using extended conceit, often (though not always) about religion. They include such figures as John Donne, George Herbert, Andrew Marvell.

Cavalier poets in England were Baroque royalist group, writing primarily about courtly love, called Sons of Ben (after Ben Jonson) and included Richard Lovelace with William Davenant.

The Pegnesischer Blumenorden (1644 – present) is a German Baroque literary society represented the Nuremberg Poetic School of Georg Philipp Harsdörffer and other figures.

Emergence of Qing poetry (1644–1912) in China.

Danrin school in Japan.

== Eighteenth century (1700–1800) ==
The 17th-century Classicism has recurred in various Neoclassical schools and poets such as Voltaire and Friedrich Gottlieb Klopstock since the eighteenth century.

Augustan poets such as Alexander Pope.

Rococo, also known as Late Baroque, is the final expression of the Baroque movement that began in France in the 1730s and characterized by a cheerful lightness and intimacy of tone, and an elegant playfulness in erotic light poetry and principally small literary forms. The poets associated with style are Paolo Rolli, Pietro Metastasio, Friedrich von Hagedorn, P. J. Bernard, Johann Wilhelm Ludwig Gleim, Johann Uz, Johann Nikolaus Götz, Christoph Martin Wieland, Alexandre Masson de Pezay, Abbé de Favre, Évariste de Parny, Ippolit Bogdanovich, and others.

The Sturm und Drang was a from 1767 till 1785 literary group, precursor to the Romanticism. Its literature often features a protagonist which is driven by emotion, impulse and other motives that run counter to the enlightenment rationalism. The key members were Johann Wolfgang von Goethe with Friedrich Schiller, among other poets Heinrich Wilhelm von Gerstenberg, Christian Friedrich Daniel Schubart, and Gottfried August Bürger.

== Nineteenth century (1800–1900) ==
Romanticism started in the late 18th century Western Europe, but existed largely within the nineteenth. Wordsworth's and Coleridge's 1798 publication of Lyrical Ballads is considered by some as the first important publication in the movement. Romanticism stressed strong emotion, imagination, freedom within or even from classical notions of form in art, and the rejection of established social conventions. It stressed the importance of "nature" in language and celebrated the achievements of those perceived as heroic individuals and artists. Romantic poets include William Blake, William Wordsworth, Samuel Taylor Coleridge, Lord Byron, Percy Bysshe Shelley, and John Keats (those previous six sometimes referred to as the Big Six, or the Big Five without Blake); other Romantic poets include James Macpherson, Robert Southey, Emily Brontë, Adelbert von Chamisso, Alexander Pushkin, and Mikhail Lermontov.

The Lake Poets was a group of Romantic poets from the English Lake District who wrote about nature and the sublime. Among them were William Wordsworth, Samuel Taylor Coleridge, and Robert Southey.

The Pre-Raphaelite Brotherhood was a primarily English art and poetic school, founded in 1848, based ostensibly on undoing innovations by the painter Raphael. Some members were both painters and poets. Most significant figures include Dante Gabriel Rossetti and Christina Rossetti.

The Fleshly School was realistic, sensual school of poets.

The Transcendentalists were from the mid-19th-century American movement: poetry and philosophy concerned with self-reliance, independence from modern technology. It includes Ralph Waldo Emerson and Henry David Thoreau.

The Verismo is a derivative of literary realism and naturalism that began in post-unification Italy. The poets which associated with the movement are Giosuè Carducci and Cesare Pascarella.

The Aesthetes were an artistic and literary movement of Victorian era from 1860s related to the Decadent Movement that cultivated beauty, rather than didactic purpose, and illustrated by the slogan "art for art's sake." The poets most strongly associated with the aestheticism are Dante Gabriel Rossetti, Algernon Charles Swinburne, Oscar Wilde, and A. E. Housman.

The Parnassians were a group of the 1860s–1890s French poets, named after their journal, the Parnasse contemporain. They included Charles Leconte de Lisle, Théodore de Banville, Sully Prudhomme, Paul Verlaine, François Coppée, and José María de Heredia. Non-French parnassians were Felicjan Faleński, Alberto de Oliveira, Olavo Bilac, and others. In reaction to the looser forms of romantic poetry, they strove for exact and faultless workmanship, selecting exotic and classical subjects, which they treated with rigidity of form and emotional detachment.

The American literary regionalism or "local color" is a style, genre or movement of writing, which includes both poetry and prose, in the United States from circa 1865 that speak nostalgically to modern readers. In this style the setting is particularly important and writers often emphasize specific features, such as dialect, customs, history and landscape, of a particular region. Figures associated with the movement such as Alice Cary, Alice Brown, Hamlin Garland, Sherwood Anderson, Zitkala-Ša, William Faulkner, August Derleth, Wendell Berry, and others.

Symbolism started in the late 19th century in France and Belgium. It included Paul Verlaine, Tristan Corbière, Arthur Rimbaud, and Stéphane Mallarmé. Alexandru Macedonski was a prominent Romanian symbolist. Symbolists believed that art should aim to capture more absolute truths which could be accessed only by indirect methods. They used extensive metaphor, endowing particular images or objects with symbolic meaning. They were hostile to "plain meanings, declamations, false sentimentality and matter-of-fact description".

Russian symbolism arose enough separately from West European symbolism, emphasizing mysticism of Sophiology and defamiliarization. Its most significant poets included Alexander Blok, Valery Bryusov, Fyodor Sologub, Konstantin Balmont, Vyacheslav Ivanov, Dmitry Merezhkovsky, Zinaida Gippius, and Andrei Bely.

Irish Literary Revival was a movement within Celtic Revival in the late 19th and early 20th century that advocated rebirth of creativity in Irish language and included such poets as George Sigerson, W. B. Yeats, Roger Casement, and Thomas MacDonagh.

Modernist poetry is a broad term for poetry written between 1890 and 1970 in the tradition of Modernist literature. Schools within it include already 20th-century Acmeist poetry, Imagism, Objectivism, and the British Poetry Revival.

The Fireside Poets (also known as the "Schoolroom" or "Household Poets") were a group of American poets from New England. The group is usually described as comprising Henry Wadsworth Longfellow, William Cullen Bryant, John Greenleaf Whittier, James Russell Lowell, and Oliver Wendell Holmes Sr.

== Twentieth century (1900–2000) ==
The Mahjari poets (émigré school) was a neo-romantic movement within Arabic-language poets in the Americas (Ameen Rihani, Kahlil Gibran, Nasib Arida, Mikhail Naimy, Elia Abu Madi), that appeared at the turn of the 20th century.

New peasant poets was the conditional collective name of a group of peasant origin and country trend during the Silver Age of Russian Poetry. The key figures include Nikolai Klyuev, Pyotr Oreshin, Alexander Shiryaevets, Sergei Klychkov, and Sergei Yesenin.

The Futurists were an avant-garde, largely Italian and Russian, movement codified in 1909 by the Manifesto of Futurism. They managed to create a new language free of syntax punctuation, and metrics that allowed for free expression. Poets involved with Futurism Filippo Tommaso Marinetti, Giovanni Papini, Mina Loy, Aldo Palazzeschi, Velimir Khlebnikov, Almada Negreiros, Vladimir Mayakovsky, Stanisław Młodożeniec, and Jaroslav Seifert.

The Cubo-Futurists were an avant-garde art and poetry movement within Russian Futurism in the 1910s with practice of zaum, the experimental visual and sound poetry. Their major figures include David Burliuk, Velimir Khlebnikov, Aleksei Kruchyonykh, and Vladimir Mayakovsky.

The Ego-Futurists were another poetry school within Russian Futurism during the 1910s, based on a personality cult. Most prominent figures among them are Igor Severyanin and Vasilisk Gnedov.

The Acmeists were a Russian modernist poetic school, which emerged ca. 1911 and to symbols preferred direct expression through exact images. Figures involved with Acmeism include Nikolay Gumilev, Osip Mandelstam, Mikhail Kuzmin, Anna Akhmatova, and Georgiy Ivanov.

The Imagists were (predominantly young) modernist poets working in England and America in the early 20th century (from 1914), including F. S. Flint, T. E. Hulme, Richard Aldington and Hilda Doolittle (known primarily by her initials, H.D.). They rejected Romantic and Victorian conventions, favoring precise imagery and clear, non-elevated language. Ezra Pound formulated and promoted many precepts and ideas of Imagism. His "In a Station of the Metro" (Roberts & Jacobs, 717), written in 1916, is often used as an example of Imagist poetry:

The apparition of these faces in the crowd;
Petals on a wet, black bough.

The Dada avant-garde movement touted by its proponents (Jean Arp, Kurt Schwitters, Tristan Tzara) as anti-art, dada focused on going against artistic norms and conventions.

The Imaginists were avant-garde post-Russian Revolution of 1917 poetic movement that created poetry based on sequences of arresting and uncommon images. The major figures include Sergei Yesenin, Anatoly Marienhof, and Rurik Ivnev.

The Proletarian poetry is a genre of political poetry developed in the United States during the 1920s and 1930s that endeavored to portray class-conscious perspectives of the working-class. Connected through their mutual political message that may be either explicitly Marxist or at least socialist, the poems are often aesthetically disparate.

The Harlem Renaissance was a cultural movement in the 1920s involving many African-American writers from the New York Neighbourhood of Harlem.

The Scottish Renaissance, including Scottish Gaelic Renaissance, was a modernist, mainly literary, movement of the 1920s to mid-20th century that incorporated folk influences with no nostalgia and a strong concern for the fate of Scotland's declining languages. The major figures associated with the movement were Hugh MacDiarmid, Edwin Muir, Naomi Mitchison, William Soutar, Lewis Grassic Gibbon, Robert Garioch, Sorley Maclean, George Campbell Hay, Sydney Goodsir Smith, Edwin Morgan, Derick Thomson, and Iain Crichton Smith.

The Hermeticism was influential in the Renaissance, after the translation into Latin of a compilation of Greek Hermetic treatises called the Corpus Hermeticum by Marsilio Ficino (1433–1499). Within the Novecento Italiano, Hermetic poetry became an Italian literary movement in the 1920s and 1930s, developing in the interwar period.

The OBERIU was a short-lived influential Soviet Russian avant-garde art group in Leningrad from 1927 to repressions in 1931, which held provocative performances, that foreshadowed the European theatre of the absurd, nonsensical illogical absurd verse and prose. Members associated with it were Daniil Kharms, Alexander Vvedensky, Nikolay Zabolotsky, Nikolay Oleynikov, Konstantin Vaginov, Igor Bekhterev (ru), and Yury Vladimirov (ru).

The Négritude cultural, literary and political movement mainly developed by a francophone elite in the African diaspora during the 1930s, aimed at raising and cultivating "black consciousness"; the poets such as Léopold Senghor, Léon Damas and Aimé Césaire drew heavily on a surrealist literary style.

The Objectivists were a loose-knit group of second-generation Modernists from the 1930s. They include Louis Zukofsky, Lorine Niedecker, Charles Reznikoff, George Oppen, Carl Rakosi, and Basil Bunting. Objectivists treated the poem as an object; they emphasised sincerity, intelligence, and the clarity of the poet's vision.

The "Apollo Society" with the magazine Apollo was a neo-romantic group, formed in Cairo, Egypt in 1932. Its members were Ahmed Zaki Abu Shadi (founder), Ibrahim Nagi, Ali Mahmoud Taha, and Abu al-Qasim al-Shabbi.

The Afro-Surrealism is an art and poetry movement primarily in the African diaspora, inspired by Négritude and postcolonial literature and partially coinciding with them. Notable practitioners and inspirations of it include Léopold Senghor, Aimé Césaire, Bob Kaufman, Ted Joans, Will Alexander, and Krista Franklin.

The Black Mountain poets (also known as the Projectivists) were a group of the mid-20th-century (from the 1950) avant-garde and postmodern poets associated with Black Mountain College in the United States.

The San Francisco Renaissance was initiated by Kenneth Rexroth and Madeline Gleason in Berkeley in the 1950s. It included Robert Duncan, Jack Spicer, and Robin Blaser. They were consciously experimental and had close links to the Black Mountain and Beat poets.

The Beat Generation poets or the Beats met in New York in the 1950s–1960s. The core group were Jack Kerouac, Allen Ginsberg, and William S. Burroughs, who were joined later by Gregory Corso.

The New York School was an informal group of poets active in 1950s New York City whose work was said to be a reaction to the Confessionalists. Some major figures include John Ashbery, Frank O'Hara, James Schuyler, Kenneth Koch, Barbara Guest, Joe Brainard, Ron Padgett, Ted Berrigan and Bill Berkson.

The Concrete poetry was an avant-garde movement started in Brazil during the 1950s, characterized for extinguishing the general conception of poetry, creating a new language called ''verbivocovisual''. its significant figures are Augusto de Campos, Haroldo de Campos, and Décio Pignatari.

The Movement was a group of English writers including Kingsley Amis, Philip Larkin, Donald Alfred Davie, D. J. Enright, John Wain, Elizabeth Jennings and Robert Conquest. Their tone is anti-romantic and rational. The connection between the poets was described as "little more than a negative determination to avoid bad principles."

The "Modernist School", the "Blue Star", and the "Epoch" were modernist, including avant-garde and surrealism, Chinese poetic groups founded in 1954 in Taiwan and led by Qin Zihao (1902–1963) and Ji Xian (b. 1903).

Confessional poetry was an American movement that emerged in the late 1950s and the 1960s. They drew on personal history for their artistic inspiration. Poets in this group include Sylvia Plath, Anne Sexton, John Berryman, and Robert Lowell.

Soviet nonconformism was a dissident, stylistically diverse art "movement" in the post-Stalinist era Soviet Union from 1950s to 1980s in opposition to official socialist realism. Poets involved with it Evgenii Kropivnitsky, Varlam Shalamov, Yury Dombrovsky, Aleksandr Galich, Igor Kholin, Naum Korzhavin, Yury Aikhenvald, Genrikh Sapgir, Vilen Barskyi, Roald Mandelstam, Leonid Chertkov, Gennadiy Aygi, Stanislav Krasovitsky, Vsevolod Nekrasov, Yuliy Kim, Anri Volokhonsky, Andrei Bitov, Igor Sinyavin, Joseph Brodsky, Alexei Khvostenko, Yevgeny Kharitonov, Dmitry Prigov, Kari Unksova, Ry Nikonova, Oleg Grigoriev, Eduard Limonov, Viktor Krivulin, Sergey Stratanovsky, Vladimir Erl, Elena Ignatova, Serge Segay, Lev Rubinstein, Aleksandr Mironov, Elena Shvarts, and Sergey Gandlevsky.

The Liverpool poets, also known as the Mersey Beat poets, were Adrian Henri, Brian Patten and Roger McGough from the 1960s. Their work was an English equivalent to the American Beats.

The Hungry generation was a group of about 40 poets in West Bengal, India during 1961–1965 who revolted against the colonial canons in Bengali poetry and wanted to go back to their roots. The movement was spearheaded by Shakti Chattopadhyay, Malay Roy Choudhury, Samir Roychoudhury, and Subimal Basak.

The Black Arts Movement (BAM) was an African-American-led art and literary movement that was active during the 1960s and 1970s and related to Black Power politics. Major poets associated with it were Dudley Randall, Sun Ra, Gwendolyn Brooks, Maya Angelou, Amiri Baraka, Henry Dumas, Audre Lorde, Sonia Sanchez, Larry Neal, Ishmael Reed, David Henderson, Haki R. Madhubuti, and Nikki Giovanni.

The Language poets were American avant garde poets who emerged in the 1960s-1990s; their approach started with the modernist emphasis on method. They were reacting to the poetry of the Black Mountain and Beat poets. The poets included: Leslie Scalapino, Bruce Andrews, Charles Bernstein, Ron Silliman, Barrett Watten, Lyn Hejinian, Bob Perelman, Rae Armantrout, Carla Harryman, Clark Coolidge, Hannah Weiner, Susan Howe, and Tina Darragh.

The Minimalism is an avantgardist artistic, dramatic and literary movement in the late 1960s and '70s U.S. emerged, is characterized by an economy with words and a focus on surface description. The poets who identified with it are Samuel Beckett, Grace Paley, Raymond Carver, Robert Grenier, Aram Saroyan, and Jon Fosse.

The British Poetry Revival was a loose wide-reaching collection of groupings and subgroupings during the late 1960s and early 1970s. It was a modernist reaction to the conservative The Movement. The leading poets included J. H. Prynne, Eric Mottram, Tom Raworth, Denise Riley, and Lee Harwood.

The Misty Poets are a group of Chinese poets whose style is defined by the obscurity of its imagery and metaphors. The movement was born after the Cultural Revolution, mainly from the 1970s. Leading members include Bei Dao, Duo Duo, Shu Ting, Yang Lian, Gu Cheng, and also Hai Zi.

The Martian poets were English poets of the 1970s and early 1980s, including Craig Raine and Christopher Reid. Through the heavy use of curious, exotic, and humorous metaphors, Martian poetry aimed to break the grip of "the familiar" in English poetry, by describing ordinary things as if through the eyes of a Martian.

The Nuyorican poets of the 1970s, 1980s, and 1990s wrote and recited dramatic poetry in Spanish, Spanglish, and English with humor and rage about social injustice, ethnic and racial discrimination, and U.S. colonialism in Latin America and the Caribbean. Leaders of the Nuyorican poetry movement include Pedro Pietri, Miguel Algarín, and Giannina Braschi. The Nuyorican movement gave rise to Poetry slams, a performing arts practice developed at open mic venues such as the Nuyorican Poets Cafe in Loisada of New York City.

The Moscow Conceptualists were a movement within Soviet nonconformist art emerged during the 1970s and related to western conceptual and neo-conceptual art in which the concept(s) involved in the work are prioritized equally to or more than traditional aesthetic or material concerns. The Moscow group included not only artists but also poets Vsevolod Nekrasov, Dmitry Prigov, Lev Rubinstein, Anna Alchuk, and Timur Kibirov.

The Metarealists, namely metaphysical realists, in the 1970s–90s unofficial postmodern Soviet and Russian poetry, who all used complex metaphors which they called meta-metaphors. Their representatives are Konstantin Kedrov, Viktor Krivulin, Elena Katsyuba, Ivan Zhdanov, Elena Shvarts, Vladimir Aristov, Aleksandr Yeryomenko, Yuri Arabov, and Alexei Parshchikov.

The New Formalism is a movement originating ca. 1977 in American poetry that promotes a return to metrical and rhymed verse. Rather than looking to the Confessionalists, they look to Robert Frost, Richard Wilbur, James Merrill, Anthony Hecht, and Donald Justice for poetic influence. These poets are associated with the West Chester University Poetry Conference, and with literary journals like The New Criterion and The Hudson Review. Associated poets include Dana Gioia, X.J. Kennedy, Timothy Steele, Mark Jarman, Rachel Hadas, R. S. Gwynn, Charles Martin, Phillis Levin, Kay Ryan, Brad Leithauser.

The New Sincerity is a cultural movement and trend that matured in the 1990s within Postmodernism, primarily in America, preferring sincerity ethos to the hegemony of postmodernist irony and cynicism. Poets named as associated with this movement have included David Berman, Catherine Wagner, Dean Young, Miranda July, Tao Lin, Steve Roggenbuck, Frederick Seidel, Arielle Greenberg, Karyna McGlynn, and Mira Gonzalez.

== Twenty-first century (2000–present) ==
An emergent movement across poetry is termed Poelectics, a general trend among many poets to vary subject, mode and form according to the artistic impetus, situation or commission at hand. This can be observed across contemporary published poetry in the West as an intensification within individual poets' oeuvres of "all kinds of style, subject, voice, register and form" which replaces, in large measure, the more conventional or traditional search by authors for a singular definitive poetic voice.

== Alphabetic list ==
- Absurdism
- Acmeist poetry
- Aestheticism
- Afro-Surrealism
- Alabama State Poetry Society
- American literary regionalism
- Apollo Society
- Arizona State Poetry Society
- Black Arts Movement
- British Poetry Revival
- Cairo poets
- Chhayavad
- Classical Chinese poetry
- Conceptismo
- Conceptual writing
- Confessional poetry
- Columbine Poets of Colorado
- Concrete poetry
- Connecticut Poetry Society
- Crescent Moon Society
- Cubo-Futurism
- Culteranismo
- Cyclic Poets
- Dada
- Danrin school
- Deep image
- Della Cruscans
- Dymock poets
- Ego-Futurism
- Expressionism
- Florida State Poets Association
- Fugitives (poets)
- Futurism (literature)
- Generation of '27
- Georgia Poetry Society
- Georgian poets
- Goliard
- Graveyard poets
- Grobianism
- The Group (literature)
- Harlem Renaissance
- Harvard Aesthetes
- Heptanese School (literature)
- Illinois State Poetry Society
- Imaginism
- Imagism
- Impressionism
- Iowa Poetry Association
- Irish Literary Revival
- Jindyworobak movement
- Kentucky State Poetry Society
- Lake Poets
- La Pléiade
- League of Minnesota Poets
- Liverpool poets
- Los Contemporáneos
- Louisiana State Poetry Society
- Mahjar
- Maine Poets Society
- Mannerism
- Marinism
- Massachusetts State Poetry Society
- Metarealism
- Minimalism
- Mississippi Poetry Society
- Missouri State Poetry Society
- Misty Poets
- Modern Chinese poetry
- Modernist poetry
- Modernist School (Taiwan)
- Moscow Conceptualists
- The Movement
- National Federation of State Poetry Societies
- Naturalism
- Négritude
- Neotericism
- Net-poetry
- Nevada Poetry Society
- New Apocalyptics
- New Formalism
- New Mexico State Poetry Society
- New peasant poets
- New Sincerity
- Nijō poetic school
- North Dakota State Poetry Society
- Nuyorican movement
- Oberiu
- OBJECT:PARADISE
- Oregon Poetry Association
- Others (art group)
- Oulipo
- Panfuturism
- Pegnesischer Blumenorden
- Pennsylvania Poetry Society
- Petrarchism
- Poets Roundtable of Arkansas
- Poetic transrealism
- Poetry Society of Indiana
- Poetry Society of Michigan
- Poetry Society of Oklahoma
- Poetry Society of Tennessee
- Poetry Society of Texas
- Postmodernism
- Précieuses
- Pre-Raphaelite Brotherhood
- Realism
- Rhymers' Club
- Rochester Poets
- Rococo
- Scottish Renaissance
  - Scottish Gaelic Renaissance
- Sicilian School
- Socialist realism
- Poetry Slam
- Renaissance literature
- Sons of Ben
- South Dakota State Poetry Society
- Southern Agrarians
- Soviet nonconformism
- Spasmodic poets
- Spectrism
- Sturm und Drang
- Surrealist poets
- The poets of Elan
- Transcendentalism
- Uranian poetry
- Utah State Poetry Society
- Verismo
- Vitalist poetry
- WyoPoets

== See also ==
- List of literary movements

== Main sources ==
- Baldick, Chris (2015). The Oxford Dictionary of Literary Terms (Online Version) (4th ed.). Oxford University Press. ISBN 9780191783234.
- Greene, Roland; et al., eds. (2012). The Princeton Encyclopedia of Poetry and Poetics (4th rev. ed.). Princeton, NJ: Princeton University Press. ISBN 978-0-691-15491-6.
- Willhardt, Mark; Parker, Alan Michael, eds. (2001). Who's Who in Twentieth Century World Poetry. Who's Who Series. London: Routledge. doi:10.4324/9780203991992. ISBN 0-415-16355-2.
