= Audrae Visser =

Poet Laureate of South Dakota (1974–2001)

- Born: Audrae Eugenie Visser; June 3, 1919 near Hurley, South Dakota, United States
- Died: October 8, 2001 (aged 82); Mabank, Texas
- Education: Black Hills Teachers College; University of Denver
- Occupation: Poet

Audrae Eugenie Visser (June 3, 1919 – October 8, 2001) was an American poet and educator. She was Poet Laureate of South Dakota between 1974 and her death in 2001.

== Life ==
Audrae Visser was born on June 3, 1919, to Harry and Addie Mae Visser on the family farm near Hurley, South Dakota. The family moved to Elkton when Visser was 12. She graduated from Flandreau High School in Flandreau, South Dakota, in 1938. She subsequently attended the Black Hills Teachers College, University of Denver, and South Dakota State University. In 1939, she began teaching at various schools in Moody County, and after 1943 taught at several schools across South Dakota and Minnesota. Between 1954 and 1955, she taught the children of U.S. Air Force personnel stationed in Nagoya, Japan.

Visser began writing poetry at the age of 12. Her first published work was a poem featured in Pasque Petals, the magazine of the South Dakota State Poetry Society, in 1941. Her first book of poetry, Rustic Roads, was published in 1961. Her other published works include Grass Roots Poetry in 1991 and Prairie Poetry in 1998.

Visser was named Poet Laureate of South Dakota in 1974 by Governor Richard Kneip. During that time, she also served as associate editor and editor of Pasque Petals. In 1990, she was awarded the title of Woman of Achievement in Literature from the General Federation of Women's Clubs in South Dakota.

Visser died on October 8, 2001, in Mabank, Texas.

== Works ==
- Visser, Audrae (1961). Rustic Roads and Other Poems. New York, NY: Exposition Press. OCLC 3196623.
- Visser, Audrae (1974). Poems for Brother Donald. Elkton, SD: Lundgren Publishing Company. OCLC 17253165.
- Visser, Audrae (1980). South Dakota. OCLC 7100304.
- Visser, Audrae (1981). Honyocker Stories. Flandreau, SD: Booster Publishing Company. OCLC 7536697.
- Visser, Audrae (1986). Country Cousin. OCLC 14289397.
- Visser, Audrae (1991). Grass Roots Poetry. Freeman, SD: Pine Hill Press. ISBN 978-0962924002. OCLC 23886384.
- Visser, Audrae (1998). Prairie Poetry. Freeman, SD: Pine Hill Press. ISBN 9781575791388. OCLC 42310062.
