= Poet Laureate of South Dakota =

The poet laureate of South Dakota is the poet laureate for the U.S. state of South Dakota. The first poet laureate was appointed in 1937, and a permanent office of poet laureate of South Dakota was created by legislation in 1959. The Governor has the authority to appoint a candidate who has received a recommendation from the South Dakota State Poetry Society. The appointment was indefinite, "during the pleasure of the Governor", until 2015, when the term was set at four years. Past appointees have lifetime emeritus status.

== List of poets laureate ==
- Charles "Badger" Clark (1937–1957)
- Adeline Jenny (1958-1973)
- Mabel Frederick (July-October 1973)
- Audrae Visser (1974-October 2001)
- David Allan Evans (2002–2014, retired)
- Lee Ann Roripaugh (2015–2019)
- Christine Stewart-Nuñez (2019–2022)
- Bruce Roseland (2023-Present)

== See also ==
- Poet laureate
- List of U.S. state poets laureate
- United States Poet Laureate
