= Laura Evans =

Laura Evans may refer to:

- Laura Evans (actress) (born 1986), British actress and singer
- Laura Evans (snooker player) (born 1986), Welsh snooker player
- Laura Evans (sex worker) (1871–1953), madam and sex worker in the Old West
- Laura Evans-Williams (1883–1944), née Evans, Welsh soprano singer
- Laura Evans Reid (1883–1951), née Evans, Canadian painter
