= Sherwood Ross =

American journalist

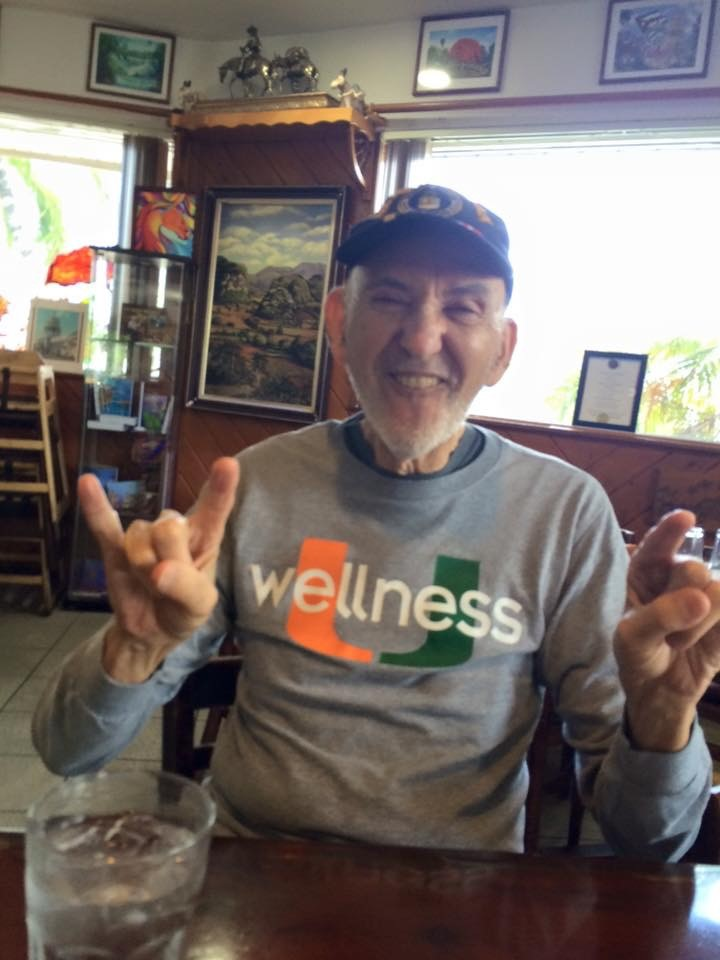
Sherwood Ross (2015).

Sherwood Ross (May 5, 1933 – June 21, 2018) was an American journalist, activist, songwriter and poet. He was best known for publicizing James Meredith's historic voter registration drive through rural Mississippi called the "March Against Fear". He was credited with helping save Meredith's life after the civil rights leader was shot during an ambush.

== "James, he's got a gun!" ==
The march set out from Memphis, Tennessee, on June 5, 1966, with only a handful of participants – five men, including Meredith and Ross. Meredith wanted to inspire black voters in his home state of Mississippi to exercise their voting rights. His march was to become a flash-point for the civil rights movement. The next day a lone white gunman opened fire on Meredith in Hernando, Mississippi. Ross can be seen in photos tending to Meredith's gunshot wounds. Ross had hoped to avert such a tragedy by encouraging news agencies to follow the event. Meredith was ambushed all the same, but the ensuing media coverage sparked outrage and galvanized the movement's leadership, which had spurned Meredith as a lone crusader.

"James, he's got a gun!" Ross was quoted as saying in his eye-witness account of the shooting that was published on the front page of The Washington Star and other major newspapers. Photos of Meredith writhing in agony appeared in newspapers around the world. One such photo by the Associated Press garnered the Pulitzer Prize in 1967. These images – along with Ross' appearance the following day on NBC's Today show calling for reinforcements – prompted Rev. Dr. Martin Luther King, Stokely Carmichael, and other civil rights leaders to rally to Mississippi to continue in Meredith's footsteps. "Thousands from all races responded over the next few weeks so that the renewed march became, literally, a turning point and victory celebration over Jim Crow in Mississippi," Ross later wrote about the event.

After his release from the hospital, Meredith rejoined marchers on June 25 – the day before the conclusion of the 220-mile trek to Jackson, Mississippi. As they descended upon the state capitol building, the number of protesters had mushroomed to an estimated 15,000. The event came to be known as the "Last Great March of the Civil Rights Era." It also signaled the beginning of the "Black Power" movement as Stokely Carmichael made a fiery speech popularizing the slogan following his trespassing arrest in Greenwood, Mississippi. Ross' involvement in publicizing the march and his efforts on behalf of Meredith were chronicled by historian Aram Goudsouzian in his 2014 book Down to the Crossroads: Civil Rights, Black Power and the Meredith March Against Fear.

Goudsouzian credits Ross with helping save Meredith's life by threatening the ambulance driver with losing his job if he didn't speed up and rush Meredith to the hospital. Many years later, Meredith himself recognized Ross' contribution in a story published following Ross' death in June 2018. "The Mississippi March Against Fear was a big deal primarily because of him," Meredith told the Chicago Sun-Times. "Nobody was paying attention. I told him what I was going to do …He took it serious." Ross approached Meredith about publicizing the march after attending Meredith's announcement at the White House Conference on Civil Rights in Washington, D.C. Many observers considered it a suicide mission, as Meredith had rejected support from major civil rights groups. Following the assassination attempt on Meredith and the subsequent groundswell of support, Dr. King publicly thanked Ross for his efforts on behalf of racial equality.

Years later, Ross wrote to a media colleague that his intentions were to have Meredith "surrounded by reporters" when he trudged through Ku Klux Klan territory "so they just couldn't come and shoot him and dump his body in a swamp like the three they murdered in Philadelphia, Miss". Ross made his remarks to a producer at The New American Dream radio show, which devoted a segment of its August 18, 2015, program to his first-hand account of the Meredith march.

== From the Daily News to Richard J. Daley ==
After a stint in the United States Air Force resulting in an honorable discharge, Ross attended the University of Miami (UM). He was a member of the UM debate team, which included Gerald Kogan, a future Supreme Court of Florida justice and life-long friend. He also wrote copy for the Miami Herald, and had a play, "The Peacemonger", produced at the Miami students' Box Theater. In 1955, he earned UM's first-ever degree in Race Relations. In 1956, Ross became the first white editor at Ebony magazine. In 1958, he ventured into politics as a speech writer and publicist for Chicago Mayor Richard J. Daley. He returned to journalism in 1962, covering urban affairs for the Chicago Daily News and, in 1963, he won an award for best spot news coverage for any Chicago radio station for a documentary on Dr. King's historic "March on Washington". Inspired by the likes of Chicago community organizer Saul Alinsky, Ross again took a hiatus from journalism and turned to activism and civil rights. In 1964, he left Chicago for New York, where he would become news director for the National Urban League led by Whitney Young Jr. He wrote speeches for Young and ghost wrote a syndicated column for Young called "To Be Equal". In one such column from August 1964 titled "A Visit to the Children's Zoo", Young challenged the publishing industry to end racial stereotyping and to diversify the images of children appearing in books to include blacks and other minorities. Ross also hatched the idea for a "Domestic Marshall Plan" that Young advocated, calling for investment in U.S. black communities similar to the Marshall Plan to reconstruct Europe after World War II.

== WOL's "War on slums" ==
In 1965, Ross moved his young family to Washington, D.C., where he became public affairs director for the influential soul music radio station WOL (AM). His impact in that role was colorfully depicted by reporter Carl Bernstein of Watergate fame in a May 1967 profile in The Washington Post's Sunday magazine Potomac. “Finally, there is the legacy of Sherwood Ross, called ‘the boss with the slum sauce’ by the disc jockeys,” Bernstein wrote. He added Ross was known by other monikers, among them “Robin Hood of Sherwood Jungle … the only honest white man in town … the first white guy to get some results.” Ross created and hosted WOL's public affairs program “Speak Up,” which aired from 11 p.m. to 2 a.m. on Sunday nights as part of his effort to empower listeners. Bernstein spotlighted Ross’ “War on Slums” in which Ross would drive around the city in his WOL “Slummobile” and expose substandard housing conditions. Kids would run alongside the car and tell him about vermin-infested apartments. He identified slum landlords on the air and was responsible for the repair of hundreds of dwellings. In the article, Bernstein quoted Ross' on-the-air rant against one such landlord, advising him against evicting a tenant who had called the station to denounce the condition of his rental unit. "Slum lord -- you have run-down, rat-infested, raggedy houses all over Washington and I know where they are ... If it takes me a week, if it takes me a month, I will personally inspect every one of your slums and turn my reports over" to city building inspectors. Ross told Bernstein that the "War on Slums" showed it was possible for a radio station to get results on behalf of listeners "in an action program that runs counter to some of the city's vested interests." Ross went on to say that "soul radio" stations such as WOL were a vehicle for civil rights leaders to reach a wider audience.

== Public relations man ==
Ross left WOL that year and soon thereafter founded Sherwood Ross Associates, a national public relations firm that was featured in a 1971 New York Times article titled "Public Relations With A Twist". “At 37, Sherwood Ross has already been a Chicago newspaper reporter, a star of a Washington radio show, a news director for the National Urban League and a press aide to political candidates,” the Times noted. The article went on to state that Ross’ firm was the first to promote the editorial content of magazines, helping them promote their stories in newspapers, radio and TV. In doing so, he helped many of his clients expand their circulations significantly. “He’s terrific and he’s the only public relations man I’ve ever heard editors say anything good about,” the Times reported, quoting a spokesman for Business Week, one of his many clients. A leading radio analyst called Ross “a pioneer” for his work as a magazine publicist in the 1970s and 1980s, noting that it was "groundbreaking" at that time for magazines to get their stories quoted with attributions in major newspapers. Ross publicized more than 100 national magazines and his client roster included The Atlantic, Business Week, Harvard Business Review, the New Yorker, The Nation, Playboy, Penthouse, Psychology Today, Inc. Magazine, and Essence. Ross’ work publicizing “The Education of David Stockman” for The Atlantic Monthly in 1981 spurred a national debate about the Reagan Administration's philosophy of "trickle-down economics" and helped boost the sale of the magazine by 100,000 copies. Throughout the 1990s and beyond, Ross continued to work in journalism and public relations. His business column for Reuters News Service was turned into a weekly "Workplace" column syndicated to U.S. dailies for 10 years. Ross also did public relations for a number of colleges and universities – among them Johns Hopkins University, Baylor University, Kalamazoo College, Miami Dade College, and the Massachusetts School of Law. He was described in a 2000 profile in the Rapid City Journal as "A Flack with a Conscience".

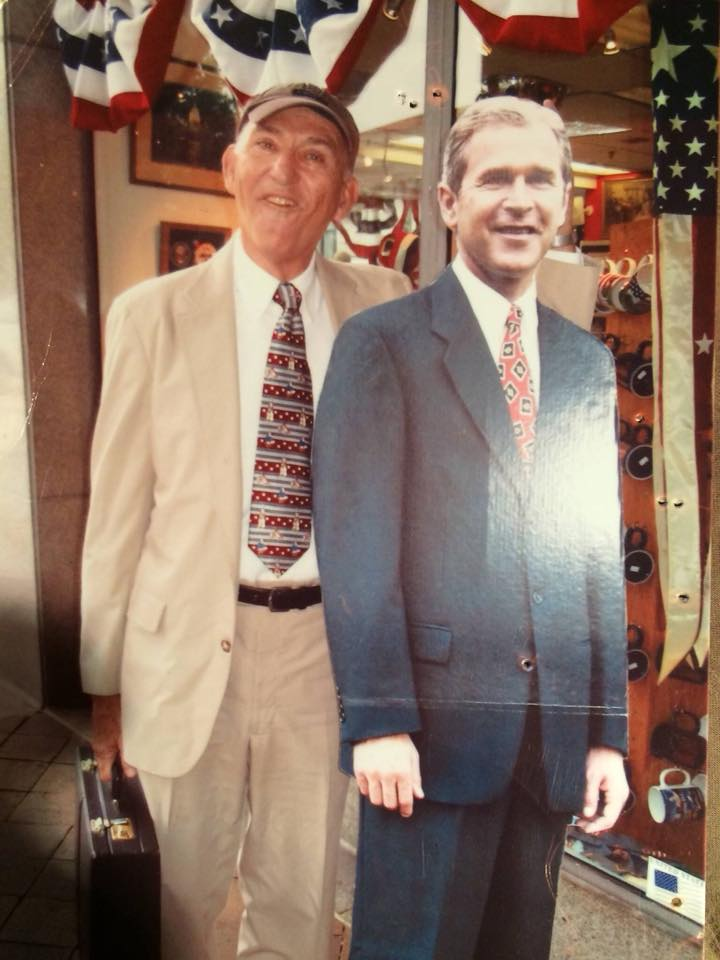
Sherwood Ross mocks a cardboard cutout of then Pres. George W. Bush near the National Press Club in Washington, DC. (2005)

== He "Sliced pastrami for the CIA" ==
During the 1980s, Ross was a regular at the Greenwich Village folk music scene and made a name for himself performing offbeat material, such as “Nightmare Room,” “Don’t Go to No Sperm Bank,” and “I Sliced Pastrami for the CIA (And Found God)." Ross had five original songs recorded on the Fast Folk label, which was later published by Smithsonian/ Folkways Records. After Ross moved to Sturgis, South Dakota, in the 1990s, he focused on writing plays – including “Baron Giro,” “Yamamoto’s Decision,” and “Kremlin Wife,” historical dramas that were met with limited success. "Yamamoto's Decision" was first read by local actors in Deadwood, South Dakota, and later in Montreal, Canada. “Baron Giro” was performed at the Live Arts Theater in Charlottesville, Virginia, in 2004. However, after returning to Miami in the early 2000s, Ross found a niche for himself as a poet and was a crowd favorite at student poetry slams and other readings. His poem “Hiroshima” was widely republished on the Internet to commemorate the anniversary of the bombings of Hiroshima and Nagasaki in August 1945. Ross dedicated a tribute poem to James Meredith titled “Jesus in Mississippi” about the 1966 “March Against Fear.” He won several awards from the Florida State Poets Association, the first in 2013 for his poem titled “Bon Voyage” about the death of a former lover, followed by "The Egret" and "O, Guitar!" in 2014, and "The Astronomers" in 2015. He also wrote anti-war poems such as "War No More" and "America, The Imperial," which can be found on the U.S. Peace Memorial Registry.

== Family history ==
Ross spent his boyhood in Chicago's Logan Square neighborhood, where he grew up in the same row of buildings as Shel Silverstein, who was three years his senior. Ross' father, Boris, immigrated to the United States from Kiev after fighting as a teenager in the 1917 Russian Revolution. Even though he fought for the prevailing side in the conflict and suffered stab wounds, Boris Ross was forced to help his family flee Soviet Russia because of continued persecution against Jews. Boris Ross moved to Chicago, where he met Sherwood Ross’ mother, Libbe, who later became an elementary school teacher. The family moved to Miami in the late 1940s when Ross was in high school. He graduated from Miami Senior High School. Ross married and divorced three times, but had a 30-year relationship with Dolores Curry of Sturgis, South Dakota. He sired four children and five grandchildren. In 1975, he purchased Woodrow Wilson's former governor's mansion in Princeton, New Jersey, but lost it in a divorce five years later. He was a New York City YMCA-league squash champion in the early 1970s, and competed in USATF masters track and field events well into his 80s. He died in June 2018 from injuries resulting from a traumatic fall in July 2016 that happened while he was walking to the gym in his Little Havana neighborhood.
