= Mildred Breedlove =

Poet Laureate of Nevada

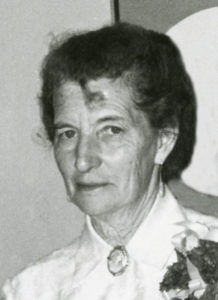
- Born: Mildred Cox; 27 May 1904; Coal Hill, Arkansas, United States
- Died: 14 August 1994 (aged 90); Ferron, Utah, United States
- Spouse: Crongy P. Breedlove (m. 1920–1957)
- Parents: John F. Cox (father); Rose M. Wilson (mother)

Poet Laureate of Nevada
- In office 15 July 1957 – 19 September 1966
- Preceded by: Luther B. Scherer
- Succeeded by: Norman Kaye

Mildred Mathews Breedlove (27 May 1904 – 14 August 1994) was an American poet who was appointed as the Poet Laureate of Nevada from 1957 to 1967. She was nominated for the Nobel Prize in Literature in 1968.

== Biography ==
Mildred Cox was born to John F. Cox and Rose M. Wilson on 27 May 1904 at Coal Hill, Arkansas. Her mother relocated the family to Prowers, Colorado, and later to Braggs, Oklahoma, following the death of her father when she was only 4 years old. There her mother married Daniel Mathews. Mildred later adopted her step-father's family name, Mathews.

Before being married to Crongy P. Breedlove at the age of sixteen, Mildred attended school in Braggs and completed the tenth grade. She obtained her teaching credential and began working as a Braggs schoolteacher after getting married. Additionally, she started her writing career as a columnist for the Muskogee Daily Phoenix and Muskogee Times Democrat.

Relocating to Las Vegas with her family in 1949, Mildred started taking poetry seriously a year later. When she sold her first poem in 1953, her poetic career took off. She received National League of American Pen Women (NLAPW) Achievement Award in 1955 and 1957. She participated actively in the National Federation of State Poetry Societies and founded the Nevada Poetry Society in 1961.

In 1957, Mildred's husband died. She was named by Governor Charles H. Russell as the Poet Laureate of Nevada on July 15. In 1964, in honor of Nevada's centennial, Governor Grant Sawyer commissioned her to compose a poem about the state. In order to gather the information for her poem Nevada, Mildred traveled throughout Nevada for three years. After the poem was bound and published, an original watercolor illustration by artist Lucile Bruner was included in a limited edition.

Because of her work, she was nominated by the United Poets Laureate International Society for the Nobel Prize in Literature and given the Narrative Poet Laureate of Nevada Award. Amado Yuzon, the international organization's founder and president, gave the said award in Las Vegas. Among her many honors from President Ferdinand Marcos of the Philippines were a gold medallion and a gold laurel wreath.

Despite receiving numerous honors and accolades for her poetry, Mildred left her position as Nevada Poet Laureate in 1966. She resigned because Governor Sawyer suppressed the poem Nevada, according to a newspaper article. There has to be a misunderstanding, according to the governor's office. Evidently this issue was never resolved. In a letter she wrote she said she could no longer live in Nevada because she had grown so resentful and bitter.

She died on 14 August 1994 in Ferron, Utah.

== Published works ==
- Those Desert Hills and Other Poems (1959)
- A Study of Rhyme & Rhythm in Creative Expression (1959)
- Nevada: A Poem Commemorating Nevada’s One Hundredth Anniversary as a State (1963)
