= George Eklund =

American poet and academic

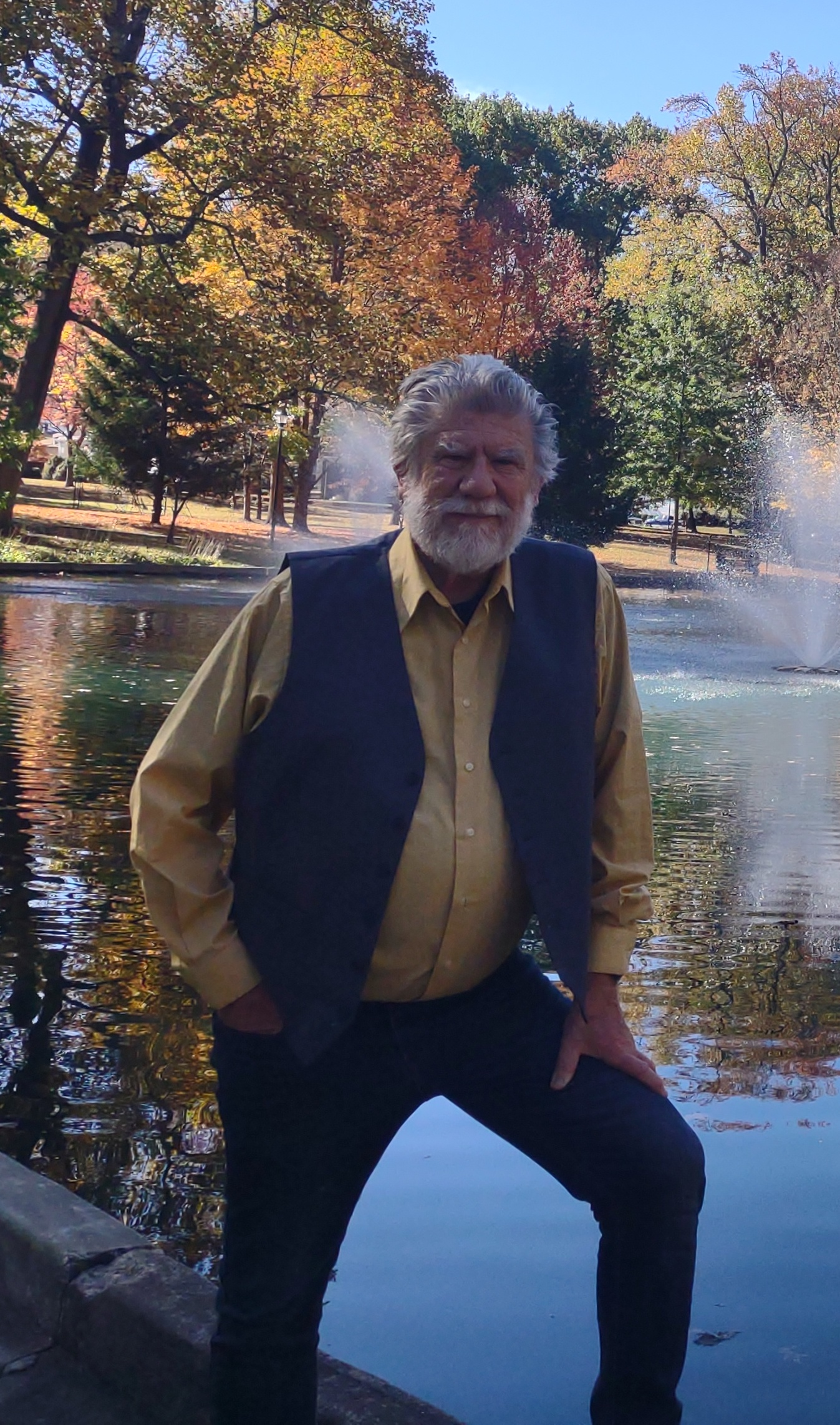
- Eklund in 2023
- Born: 1952 (age 73–74); Portsmouth, Virginia, US
- Education: University of Dubuque (BA); Iowa Writer's Workshop (MFA)
- Spouse: Laura Eklund
- Writing career
- Genre: Poetry
- Notable awards: Al Smith Fellowship in Poetry, Iowa Arts Council Poetry Award

George Eklund (born 1952 in Portsmouth, Virginia) is an American writer, translator, former educator, and the author of over ten collections of poetry. A 1992 recipient of the Al Smith Fellowship in Poetry from the Kentucky Arts Council, Eklund taught creative writing from 1989 to 2016 at Morehead State University where he was recognized with the Distinguished Creative Production Award in 2007 and 2014 and was named Professor Emeritus in 2017. He served as president of the Kentucky State Poetry Society from 2015 to 2017. His poems have appeared in major literary journals including The American Poetry Review, Beloit Poetry Journal, Crazyhorse, The Iowa Review, The Massachusetts Review, The New Ohio Review, and The North American Review.

== Personal life and education ==
Born to George Earnest Eklund and Joan Hines Eklund in Portsmouth, Virginia in 1952, Eklund grew up in Long Island, New York as the oldest of six children. Eklund recalls in a personal interview that he began to write creatively around seventh or eighth grade, as an outlet for introspection and need for privacy, and his writing activities increased alongside social justice concerns in high school.

Eklund graduated from the University of Dubuque in 1974, where he worked as editorial staff on the college newspaper and literary magazine, earning a Bachelor of Arts degree in English Education. Eklund briefly attended Columbia University's MFA program in 1978 but did not finish the program. He later attended the Writer's Workshop at the University of Iowa, graduating with the MFA in 1989.

Eklund is married to the painter and poet Laura Eklund.

== Style and influences ==
Eklund's poetic style has been characterized as surrealist by poet and critic Christopher Prewitt in a review of Eklund's collection Each Breath I Cannot Hold. "When one reads Eklund’s poetry," writes Prewitt, "one draws comparisons to Péret with his figurative, associative language, especially as it pertains to Eklund’s metaphors, which at times can also bring to mind García Lorca." Prewitt continues:

What sets Eklund’s latest full-length Each Breath I Cannot Hold apart from what readers/listeners tend to expect of surreal-oriented poetry is that Eklund grounds a poem in locations so that the wild metaphorical play can commence and open up the unconscious mind into what is both a beautiful and painful transcription of events and experiences that are transnational and that sometimes damn well near exceed corporeal human existence.

Early in his career, Eklund named James Wright, García Lorca, and César Vallejo as important influences to his own work. In an interview in 2025, when asked about the title of his newly released full-length collection Toward a Credo, Eklund shared the following philosophy about his work:

I’m very process oriented in the way I do art, and the way I think and write, and the whole idea of writing as a way to bring oneself closer to a system of belief, whether it be aesthetic or spiritual or political… I like that whole idea of writing as a way to take us toward a discovery, or call it a creed, a belief, the truth, the breakthrough of the system, whatever. So, I think that maybe that’s an aesthetic kind of statement about how I feel about writing, and maybe art in general.

== Teaching career ==
After graduating from the University of Dubuque with a Bachelor of Arts in English Education, Eklund taught high school English in Massapequa, New York for one year, before leaving public education to focus on writing. Eklund returned to public high school teaching in 1983, joining the faculty at Dubuque Community Schools, where he worked with at-risk students in an alternative school setting. After attending the Iowa Writer's Workshop and earning his Master's of Fine Arts, Eklund began teaching at Morehead State University in 1989, where he remained until 2016, and where he currently holds the title of professor emeritus.

== Published works ==
=== Books ===
- Toward a Credo. Kelsay Books, 2025. ISBN 978-1639807093
- Altar. Finishing Line Press, 2019. ISBN 9781646620388
- Wanting to Be an Element. Finishing Line Press, 2012. ISBN 9781599249452
- The Island Blade. ABZ Press, 2011. ISBN 978-0980156041
- Each Breath I Cannot Hold. Wind Publications, 2011. ISBN 9781936138333
- Assemblage Without Technique. One-Legged Cow Press, 2006.
- The Sorrow of the King. White Fields Press, 1994.
- Gone West of Sunrise Highway. Bearstone Publishing, 1982.

== Awards ==
- "Best Poet" award in 2023 at The Appalachian Arts Awards
- Al Smith Fellowship in Poetry from the Kentucky Arts Council
- Mississippi Valley Poetry Award
- Iowa Arts Council Award
