= FIBArk =

Three-day festival held in Salida, Colorado

FIBArk stands for "First in Boating the Arkansas"—it's a three-day festival held in Salida, Colorado that started in the 1950s. The history actually began in 1949 when two friends bet each other who'd win a race from Salida to Cañon City on the Arkansas River. Since that race almost killed both contestants, the race was shortened in subsequent years to about 26 miles of whitewater. It became a community-wide festival. Today, the festival draws over 10,000 people yearly, around the 3rd week of June, and includes a variety of events on the river and in town. The event has grown from a single boating race to now include biking, running, and other races. The portion of the river where the majority of the races are held runs through downtown Salida, keeping the event close to all of the other activities and festivities offered downtown during the festival.

From modest beginnings with only 23 competitors, this festival has grown to showcase more than a hundred competitors each year and now includes live music, foot and bike races, and a parade.

== History ==
It is unknown whether the origin of the first kayak race was created by a group of young Salida businessmen over coffee or if it was a dare for bragging rights between boaters. Early interest in the race was carried by word of mouth, and later was promoted by the Salida Chamber of Commerce to promote tourism as the event gained fame. It was one of the first white water events in the U.S. and helped popularize whitewater sports there, compared to the well-developed whitewater competition in Europe.

The original race was held on June 19, 1949, and was a 57-mile course from Salida to Canon City on the headwaters of the Arkansas River. The race crosses through Bighorn Sheep Canon and the Royal Gorge Canon. The first race had twenty three entrants in six boats, and only two experienced Swiss boaters finished the race.

The following year the race was shortened to forty five miles, by cutting out the Royal Gorge Canon portion, instead ending in Parkdale, Colorado. Ten boaters entered the race and only one finished.

The downriver race was shortened to the length it is today, 25.7 miles on the third year of the races since its creation. The course spanned from Salida to the nearby town of Cotopaxi. Eleven boats entered the race, and ten finished.

In the 1970s, rafting was added to the event list. This included the raft rodeo, raft sprint, and downriver raft races.

Freestyle kayaking was added in 1995. Changes over time to the kayaks made them lighter and more maneuverable, and now allowed acrobatics. Points are earned by the kayaker standing the kayak on its end, flips, and spins. This event gained national ranking in 1998, which allowed competitors to qualify for national championship events.

=== Early Hooligans ===
There were no regulations on the boats in the early years of FIBArk, and boats were made from a variety of materials. Some crafts were made from catamarans, airplane belly-tanks, pontoon boats, and covered kayaks, among a variety of other materials. The covered kayaks won because of their easy maneuverability on the swift rapids.

This "anything goes" attitude toward crafts paved the way for the modern Hooligan Race, held on the Saturday night of the festival. This race’s criteria are that nothing traditionally boat related, other than paddles, are allowed, and the crafts must be made up of anything but typical boat materials. Crafts that appear in this race are made from a variety of materials, such as inner tubes, wood, life savers, and many more.

== Today ==
As of 2026, athletes from twelve countries, including France, Germany, Mexico, Canada and the United states, complete in the boating, foot and bicycle races.

=== Races ===
==== Slalom ====
In 1953, the first whitewater Slalom races in North America were offered in Salida. This event includes 25-30 gates that the kayaker has to paddle through spanning a half mile course. Points are deducted for missing a gate, hitting a gate, or entering a gate from the wrong direction, which is difficult in whitewater rapids. It’s timed and is to show the kayaker’s skill and maneuverability. Each event has two heats, and the competitors’ best score is picked from the two in final scoring.

==== Tenderfoot Hill Climb ====
Competitors start at the intersection of F Street and 1st Street, and race up the face of "S" mountain, touch the door frame of the house at the top, and run back to the place they started. This is the first event and it kicks off the entire festival. It starts on the Friday afternoon of FIBArk weekend.

== Events and Entertainment ==
FIBArk features many events such as boating, music, attractions for children, and a small amount of shopping. Some bands from Salida's area perform on a local amphitheater. There are many boat races, including the Hooligan race, which is a race where people make boats out of anything they can find, and race them down the Arkansas. Some of them sink, some of them float, but everyone agrees that it's fun. The children's attractions feature inflatable slides and obstacle courses as well as one or two motorized rides. Some vendors in the area set up small stalls to sell their wares in the park that borders the Arkansas.
