= Methodist Mountain =

Mountain in Colorado, United States

- Location within Colorado

Highest point
- Elevation: 11,713 ft (3,570 m)
- Prominence: 807 ft (246 m)
- Isolation: 2.83 mi (4.55 km)
- Coordinates: 38°27′10″N 106°01′03″W

Geography
- Location: Chaffee and Saguache counties, Colorado, United States
- Parent range: Sangre de Cristo Range
- Topo map(s): USGS 7.5' topographic map Poncha Pass, Colorado

Climbing
- Easiest route: hike

Methodist Mountain is a mountain summit in the northern Sangre de Cristo Range of the Rocky Mountains of North America. The 11,713-foot (3,570 m) peak is located 5.5 miles (8.8 km) south by west (bearing 191°) of the City of Salida, Colorado, United States, on the drainage divide separating San Isabel National Forest and Chaffee County from Rio Grande National Forest and Saguache County. Methodist Mountain is the northernmost peak of the Sangre de Cristo Mountains, which stretch south through southern Colorado to Santa Fe, New Mexico.

== See also ==
- List of Colorado mountain ranges
- List of Colorado mountain summits
  - List of Colorado fourteeners
  - List of Colorado 4000 meter prominent summits
  - List of the most prominent summits of Colorado
- List of Colorado county high points
