= Zoe Tilghman =

American writer and historian

Zoe Agnes Stratton Tilghman (November 15, 1880- June 1964) was an American writer and historian, best known for her biography of her husband, lawman Bill Tilghman.

== Early life and education ==
Stratton was born in Greenwood County, Kansas, to Agnes M. Stratton, a homemaker mother, and rancher Mayo E. Stratton. In 1887, the family moved to what would become Osage County, Kansas; in 1893 they moved again, this time to the Cherokee Outlet. Throughout her childhood, Stratton became familiar with the region's flora and fauna, and when she was older she would ride with her father's cowhands.

Although mostly taught at home by her mother, for a time Stratton did attend public school in Arkansas City. She went on to attend the University of Oklahoma's preparatory school for a year and a half, and then, in 1897, the university itself. While at the University of Oklahoma, Stratton became the literary editor of Umpire Magazine, the school's literary magazine, and began to write poetry.

== Marriage ==
Stratton met Bill Tilghman, a friend of her father, in 1900. The two sent letters to each other while Stratton was at university, and Tilghman proposed to her in 1902. The couple married on July 15, 1903, and had a short honeymoon in Kansas City. Now Zoe Tilghman, she moved into the house her husband had shared with his previous wife, Flora, and their three children. Flora's children and Zoe had a tense relationship. Tilghman had three sons with her husband.

TIlghman worked as a schoolteacher for three years.

== Writing career ==
Tilghman began writing during her marriage.

From 1925 to 1934, Tilghman worked at Oklahoma City newspaper Harlow's Weekly as a literary editor. Tilghman was involved in organizations such as the YWCA, the Oklahoma Federation of Women's Clubs, and later became president of the Oklahoma Writer's Club.

=== Historical and non-fiction writing ===
Tilghman drew on her own experiences when writing about the early history of Oklahoma. Her 1925 book, The Dugout, was approved as a textbook in Kansas and Texas, in addition to Oklahoma. In the 1950s, Tilghman wrote several books aimed towards children.

Tilghman's historical works have been noted for their bias towards "officers of the law," and unflattering and stereotypical depictions of Native Americans, with the exception of her biography of Comanche leader Quanah Parker. However, Tilghman also did not erase Native Americans and their culture from her works on Oklahoma's history.

In the 1930s, she also published two articles in American Anthropologist.

=== Poetry ===
In 1915, Tilghman won the Oklahoma Federation of Women's Clubs's annual poetry contest.

Tilghman taught a YWCA class on poetry, and taught a poetry correspondence course through an organization in St. Louis, Missouri.

Beginning in 1935, Tilghman became the assistant director of the Federal Writers' Project in Oklahoma, through which she organized the Oklahoma Poetry Society. In 1936, the group produced a poetry anthology that was used in state public schools. Also through the Federal Writers' Project, Tilghman wrote Oklahoma: A Guide to the Sooner State.

=== Published works ===
- Outlaw Days: A True History of Early Day Oklahoma Characters
- The Dugout (1925)
- Katska of the Seminoles
- Sacajawea
- The Shoshoni
- Mika the Osage Boy
- Oklahoma Stories (1955)
- Stories of Oklahoma (1955)

==== Biographies ====
- Quanah, The Eagle of the Comanches
- Marshal of the Last Frontier: Life and Services of William Matthew (Bill) Tilghman, for Fifty Years One of the Greatest Peace Officers of the West (1949)

==== Poetry ====
- Prairie Winds (1930)

== Later life ==
Tilghman died of natural causes in 1964, at age 83. She was buried next to her husband, in Oak Park Cemetery in Chandler, Oklahoma.
