= Salida, Colorado =

City in Colorado, United States

- Statutory city
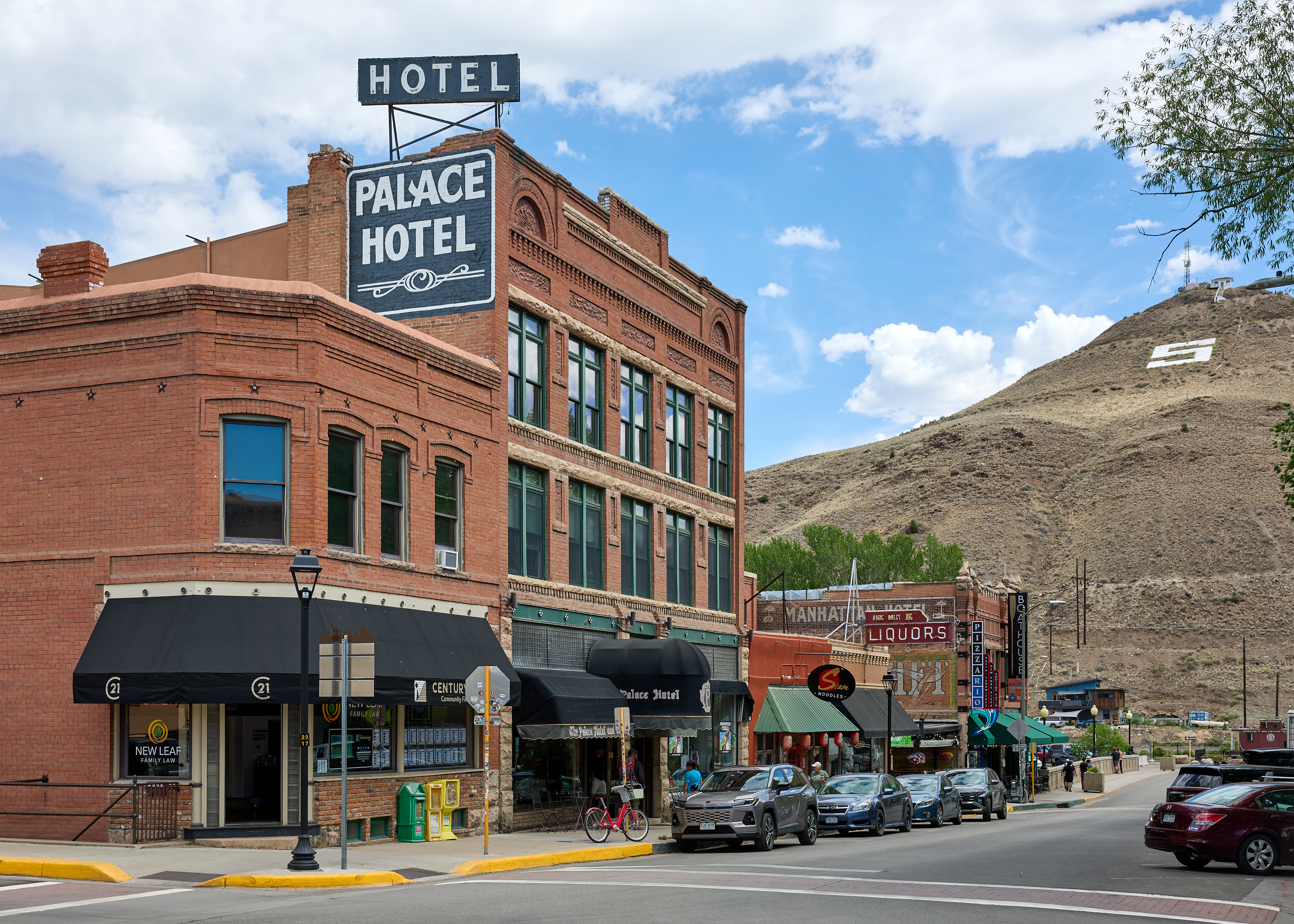
- Palace Hotel and Hotel Manhattan (background) in downtown Salida, 2026
- Nickname: Heart of the Rockies
- Motto: "Union, Justice, Safety"
- Location of the City of Salida in Chaffee County, Colorado
- Coordinates: 38°31′52″N 106°00′12″W
- Country: United States
- State: Colorado
- County: Chaffee
- Founded: 1880
- Incorporated: March 23, 1891

Government
  - Type: Statutory city

Area
  - Total: 2.77 sq mi (7.17 km^{2})
  - Land: 2.77 sq mi (7.17 km^{2})
  - Water: 0 sq mi (0.00 km^{2})
- Elevation: 7,084 ft (2,159 m)

Population (2020)
  - Total: 5,666
  - Density: 2,050/sq mi (790/km^{2})
- Time zone: UTC−7 (Mountain (MST))
  - Summer (DST): UTC−6 (MDT)
- ZIP codes: 81201, 81227 (PO Box), 81237
- Area code: 719
- FIPS code: 08-67280
- GNIS ID: 2411766
- Website: Official website

Salida (/səˈlaɪdə/ sə-LY-də; Spanish pronunciation: [saˈliða], 'exit') is the statutory city that is the county seat of and the most populous municipality in Chaffee County, Colorado, United States. The population was 5,666 at the 2020 census.

== History ==
The Arkansas, Colorado, post office opened on June 16, 1880, but was renamed Salida on March 28, 1881. Salida, meaning "exit" in Spanish, was named on account of its location near the point where the Arkansas River flows out of the valley and into Bighorn Sheep Canyon, upstream from the Royal Gorge. The Town of Salida was incorporated on March 23, 1891.

The Denver & Rio Grande Railroad built their 3-foot narrow-gauge railroad up from Texas Creek and built a station at Salida, known at the time as "South Arkansas" in 1880. bypassing the nearby community of Cleora. Rather than risk their settlement withering away from lack of rail service, it is said that the population of Cleora moved to Salida en masse. That same year, the railroad continued from "South Arkansas," following up the Arkansas river, connecting with the rich silver mines of Leadville. Later that year, the Rio Grande connected South Arkansas to Poncha Junction. This small start would connect via Marshall Pass with the western slope and Salt Lake City, Utah, turning the newly re-christened Salida into an important junction in the early history of Colorado. In 1890, the railroad laid an additional third rail through Salida, but only on the line towards Tennessee Pass. As a result, Salida became known as a tourist and railroad enthusiast mecca into the mid-20th century.

== Geography ==
According to the United States Census Bureau, the city has a total area of 2.77 square miles (7.2 km^{2}), and the Arkansas River, which runs through the town, is the major source of water for local agriculture.

The Sawatch Range runs north and south and is located roughly 10 miles (16 km) west of Salida. The Mosquito Range parallels the Sawatch Range to the east, forming the Upper Arkansas Valley, and the southern terminus of the range, just east of Salida, is known locally as the Arkansas Hills. Methodist Mountain, which is a major feature on Salida's southern horizon, is the northernmost mountain in the Sangre de Cristo Mountains. To the north of Salida is the Upper Arkansas Valley and the town of Buena Vista.

U.S. Route 50 runs along the southern edge of the city and leads east down the Arkansas River 58 miles (93 km) to Cañon City; to the west it leads 4 miles (6 km) to Poncha Springs and 63 miles (101 km) over the Continental Divide to Gunnison. Canon City and Pueblo lie to the east.

=== Climate ===
According to the Köppen climate classification, Salida has a cold semi-arid climate (BSk).

Climate data for Salida, Colorado (1991–2020 normals, extremes 1897–1923, 1931–2017)
Month	Jan	Feb	Mar	Apr	May	Jun	Jul	Aug	Sep	Oct	Nov	Dec	Year
Record high °F (°C)	65 (18)	71 (22)	77 (25)	82 (28)	93 (34)	98 (37)	103 (39)	100 (38)	94 (34)	85 (29)	80 (27)	70 (21)	103 (39)
Mean maximum °F (°C)	57.9 (14.4)	60.0 (15.6)	67.7 (19.8)	75.3 (24.1)	83.0 (28.3)	91.1 (32.8)	93.9 (34.4)	89.9 (32.2)	85.6 (29.8)	78.2 (25.7)	66.9 (19.4)	58.0 (14.4)	94.3 (34.6)
Mean daily maximum °F (°C)	43.4 (6.3)	45.5 (7.5)	54.0 (12.2)	60.3 (15.7)	70.2 (21.2)	82.0 (27.8)	85.8 (29.9)	83.1 (28.4)	77.0 (25.0)	65.4 (18.6)	52.7 (11.5)	43.2 (6.2)	63.6 (17.6)
Daily mean °F (°C)	27.4 (−2.6)	30.1 (−1.1)	37.5 (3.1)	44.0 (6.7)	52.4 (11.3)	62.7 (17.1)	67.4 (19.7)	65.1 (18.4)	58.0 (14.4)	47.1 (8.4)	36.1 (2.3)	27.9 (−2.3)	46.3 (7.9)
Mean daily minimum °F (°C)	11.5 (−11.4)	14.8 (−9.6)	21.0 (−6.1)	27.7 (−2.4)	34.6 (1.4)	43.4 (6.3)	49.1 (9.5)	47.2 (8.4)	38.9 (3.8)	28.9 (−1.7)	19.5 (−6.9)	12.6 (−10.8)	29.1 (−1.6)
Mean minimum °F (°C)	−5.1 (−20.6)	−6.3 (−21.3)	5.4 (−14.8)	12.5 (−10.8)	23.4 (−4.8)	32.4 (0.2)	40.6 (4.8)	38.4 (3.6)	26.6 (−3.0)	14.0 (−10.0)	1.6 (−16.9)	−7.3 (−21.8)	−15.7 (−26.5)
Record low °F (°C)	−35 (−37)	−33 (−36)	−21 (−29)	−8 (−22)	13 (−11)	23 (−5)	30 (−1)	31 (−1)	14 (−10)	−4 (−20)	−20 (−29)	−31 (−35)	−35 (−37)
Average precipitation inches (mm)	0.31 (7.9)	0.27 (6.9)	0.69 (18)	1.05 (27)	0.96 (24)	0.50 (13)	1.36 (35)	1.46 (37)	0.67 (17)	0.87 (22)	0.25 (6.4)	0.38 (9.7)	8.77 (223)
Average snowfall inches (cm)	4.0 (10)	4.1 (10)	6.5 (17)	8.0 (20)	2.7 (6.9)	0.0 (0.0)	0.0 (0.0)	0.0 (0.0)	0.0 (0.0)	2.6 (6.6)	4.1 (10)	4.7 (12)	36.7 (93)
Average precipitation days (≥ 0.01 in)	2.3	2.4	3.9	4.7	5.0	4.3	8.3	9.9	5.1	4.9	3.1	3.0	56.9
Average snowy days (≥ 0.1 in)	2.1	2.2	2.4	2.6	0.6	0.0	0.0	0.0	0.0	1.1	2.3	3.0	16.3
Source: NOAA (mean maxima/minima 1981–2010)

== Demographics ==
Historical population
Census	Pop.	Note	%±
1890	2,586		—
1900	3,722		43.9%
1910	4,425		18.9%
1920	4,689		6.0%
1930	5,065		8.0%
1940	4,969		−1.9%
1950	4,553		−8.4%
1960	4,560		0.2%
1970	4,355		−4.5%
1980	4,870		11.8%
1990	4,737		−2.7%
2000	5,504		16.2%
2010	5,236		−4.9%
2020	5,666		8.2%
U.S. Decennial Census

=== 2020 census ===
As of the 2020 census, Salida had a population of 5,666. The median age was 48.0 years. 17.0% of residents were under the age of 18 and 25.3% of residents were 65 years of age or older. For every 100 females there were 94.1 males, and for every 100 females age 18 and over there were 93.9 males age 18 and over.

99.4% of residents lived in urban areas, while 0.6% lived in rural areas.

There were 2,744 households in Salida, of which 20.8% had children under the age of 18 living in them. Of all households, 40.1% were married-couple households, 22.7% were households with a male householder and no spouse or partner present, and 29.8% were households with a female householder and no spouse or partner present. About 38.6% of all households were made up of individuals and 17.9% had someone living alone who was 65 years of age or older.

There were 3,282 housing units, of which 16.4% were vacant. The homeowner vacancy rate was 1.4% and the rental vacancy rate was 5.0%.

Racial composition as of the 2020 census
Race	Number	Percent
White	4,921	86.9%
Black or African American	21	0.4%
American Indian and Alaska Native	41	0.7%
Asian	39	0.7%
Native Hawaiian and Other Pacific Islander	4	0.1%
Some other race	149	2.6%
Two or more races	491	8.7%
Hispanic or Latino (of any race)	584	10.3%

=== 2000 census ===
At the 2000 census there were 5,504 people, 2,504 households, and 1,449 families living in the city. The population density was 2,480.1 inhabitants per square mile (957.6/km^{2}). There were 2,748 housing units at an average density of 1,238.3 per square mile (478.1/km^{2}). The racial makeup of the city was 92.66% White, 0.05% African American, 1.44% Native American, 0.38% Asian, 0.02% Pacific Islander, 3.29% from other races, and 2.16% from two or more races. Hispanic or Latino of any race were 10.76%.

Of the 2,504 households 25.0% had children under the age of 18 living with them, 45.9% were married couples living together, 8.6% had a female householder with no husband present, and 42.1% were non-families. 35.9% of households were one person and 15.4% were one person aged 65 or older. The average household size was 2.15 and the average family size was 2.80.

The age distribution was 21.4% under the age of 18, 6.3% from 18 to 24, 27.5% from 25 to 44, 24.2% from 45 to 64, and 20.6% 65 or older. The median age was 42 years. For every 100 females, there were 94.6 males. For every 100 females age 18 and over, there were 92.7 males.

The median household income was $28,790 and the median family income was $38,240. Males had a median income of $30,447 versus $20,867 for females. The per capita income for the city was $17,252. About 9.2% of families and 14.8% of the population were below the poverty line, including 23.7% of those under age 18 and 13.7% of those age 65 or over.

== Arts and culture ==
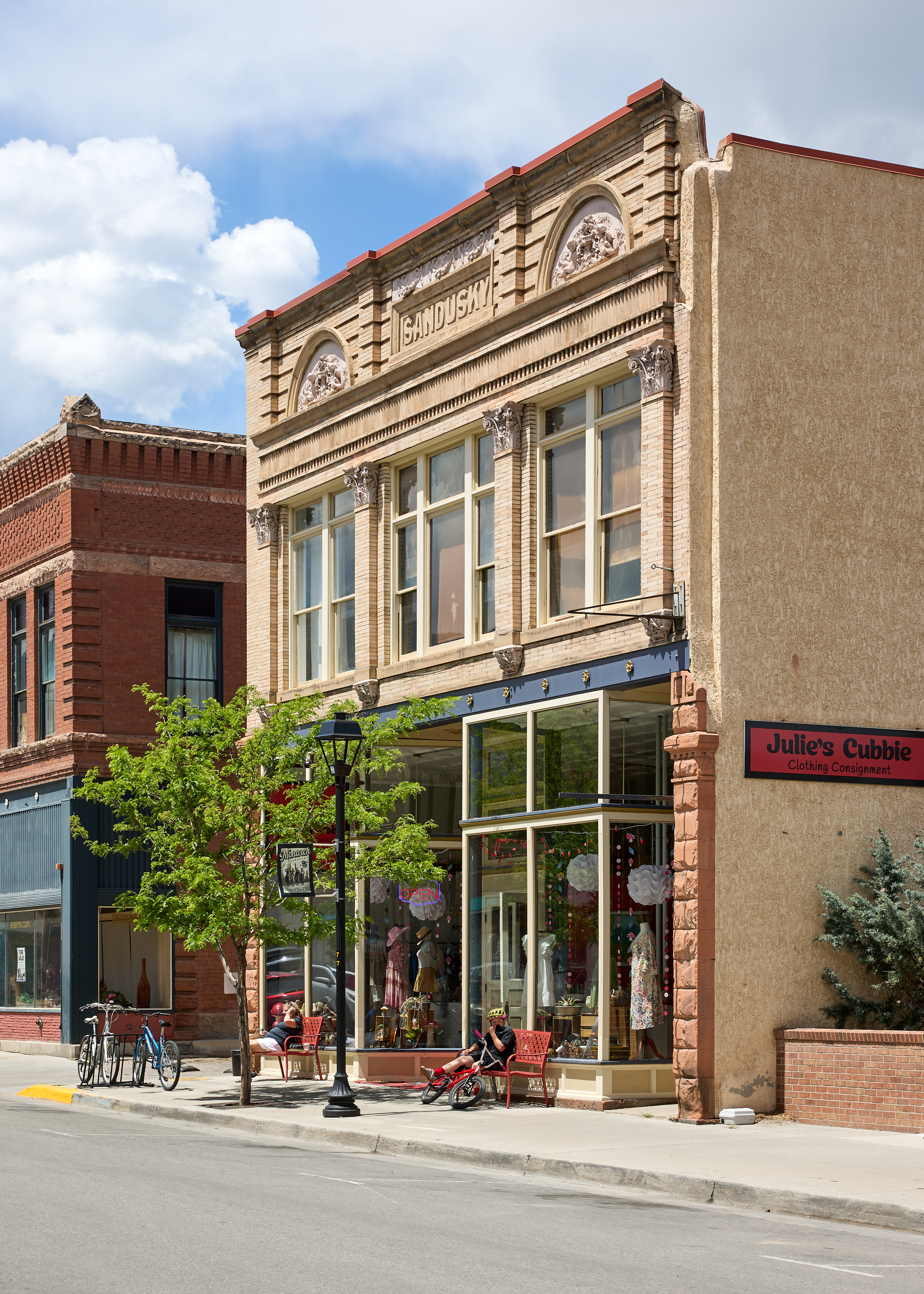
The Sandusky Block in downtown Salida (2026)

The Salida Downtown Historic District was added to the National Register of Historic Places in 1984. On March 30, 2012, downtown Salida was named one of two inaugural Certified Creative Districts in Colorado. Salida is also home to the Shavano Chapter of the Columbine Poets of Colorado, which is affiliated with the National Federation of State Poetry Societies (NFSPS). The group organizes workshops and festivals and offers poetry contests for both adults and students. On March 30, 2012, Colorado by Colorado Creative Industries, a division of the State's Office of Economic Development and International Trade, announced that the City of Salida's historic downtown was selected as one of only two inaugural “Certified Creative Districts” in Colorado.

== Education ==
The city is served by Salida Public Schools. There are two public high schools, Salida High School and Horizons Exploratory Academy; and three middle schools, Salida Middle School, Salida Montessori Charter School, and the Crest Academy. Colorado Mountain College has a campus in Salida, which opened in 2019.

== Infrastructure ==
=== Health care ===
Salida and surrounding Chaffee County are served by the Heart of the Rockies Regional Medical Center, located on the north side of town on Rush Drive.

=== Transportation ===
Salida is part of Colorado's Bustang bus network. It is on both the Alamosa-Pueblo and the Crested Butte-Denver Outrider lines. Mountain Valley Transport offers hourly service between Salida and Buena Vista during the day, as well as local door-to-door service.

== Notable people ==
- Sally Blane, actress
- Louie Croft Boyd, Superintendent of Nurses, Rio Grande Hospital
- Laura Evans, madam
- Chris Guccione, Major League Baseball umpire
- Kent Haruf, novelist
- Ruth Hinshaw Spray, peace activist

== See also ==
- Browns Canyon National Monument
