= Poet Laureate of Nevada =

The poet laureate of Nevada is the poet laureate for the U.S. state of Nevada.

== List of poets laureate ==
- Luther B. Scherer, appointed in 1950.
- Mildred Breedlove, appointed July 15, 1957
- Norman Kaye, 1967–April 2007
- Gailmarie Pahmeier September 2021 through August 2023
- Shaun Griffin May 2024 - April 2026

== Poet laureate emeritus ==
- Norman Kaye, April 2007–September 2012

== See also ==
- List of U.S. state poets laureate
