= Arkansas Hills =

Mountain range in Colorado, US

Coordinates: 38.57°N 105.84°W

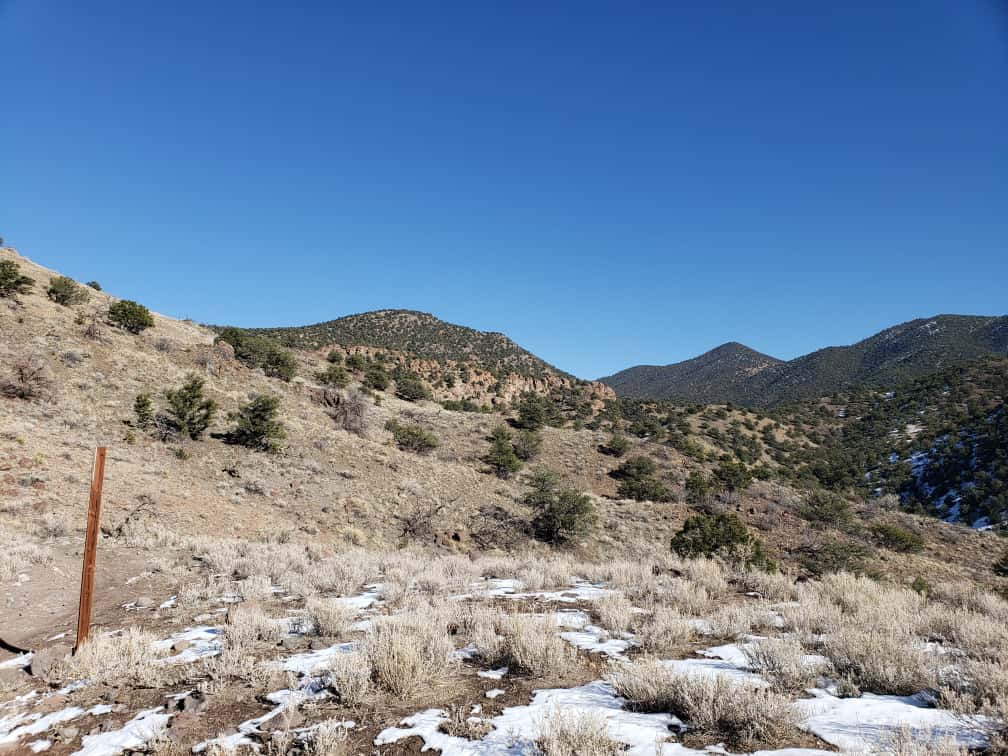
Looking east into the Arkansas Hills from the Backbone Trail, east of Salida, Colorado

The Arkansas Hills are a mountain range in Central Colorado located between the upper Arkansas River Valley and the upper South Platte River Valley. This landmass is a continuation of the ridge known as the Mosquito Range north of Trout Creek Pass. The range continues for roughly 60 miles south-southwest from Trout Creek Pass to the town of Texas Creek. Few perennial streams flow out of the Arkansas Hills, as the area is arid. The range is in the rain shadow of the much higher Sawatch to the west across the Arkansas River Valley. The City of Salida, Colorado is the most notable municipality near the Arkansas Hills. To the south is the town of Cotopaxi, Colorado, and to the east is the town of Guffey, Colorado. The highest points in the Arkansas Hills tend to be between 11,000 and 12,000 feet elevation.
