= Iowa Poetry Association =

- Established: 1945
- Type: Poetry organization
- Location: Des Moines, Iowa
- President: Jerrold Narland
- Website: iowapoetry.com

The Iowa Poetry Association (IPA) is a non-profit state-level poetry association in the U.S. state of Iowa, which is affiliated with the National Federation of State Poetry Societies (NFSPS). The organization promotes poetry, provides resources for teachers, conducts meetings and contests, publishes a poetry anthology and organizes periodic workshops and festivals.

== History ==
Lyrical Iowa anthology 2018

The Iowa Poetry Association was established in 1945, with a mission "to promote interest in and appreciation of poetry among Iowans" and "to encourage and improve the art of self-expression through verse of varied styles." The IPA celebrated its 75th anniversary in October 2020 with events in Des Moines. The Iowa Poetry Association currently includes over 350 members across the state.

== Activities ==
The Iowa Poetry Association operates an annual contest cycle, and publishes a newsletter four times a year including a message from the president and member, contest and NFSPS news and events. The society offers two workshops annually in Des Moines, Iowa, where members can submit poetry for critique, and maintains a program of resources for teachers. IPA also publishes an annual anthology including poems from the contest winners, titled Lyrical Iowa.
