= Luther B. Scherer =

American poet

- Born: March 27, 1879; Kenosha, Wisconsin, U.S.
- Died: August 19, 1957 (aged 78); Las Vegas, Nevada, U.S.
- Occupations: Businessman, poet
- Spouse: 4
- Children: 1 son, 2 daughters

Luther Bacon Scherer (March 27, 1879 – August 19, 1957) was an American businessman, real estate investor and poet.

Scherer was an investor in gambling saloons in Los Angeles, California, in the 1930s. He was a co-founder of the Pioneer Club Las Vegas in 1942, and subsequently invested in many casinos in Las Vegas, Nevada. He was the owner of large real estate holdings in Nevada and California.

Scherer published poems in the Nevada press, and republished selected poems in a poetry collection. He was appointed as the Poet Laureate of Nevada in 1950.

== Biography ==
Luther B. Scherer was born in 1879 in Kenosha, Wisconsin.

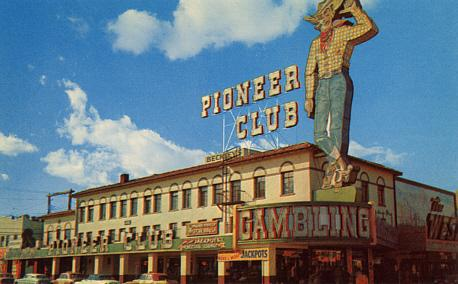
The Pioneer Club.

Scherer invested in gambling in Los Angeles, California, in the 1930s.

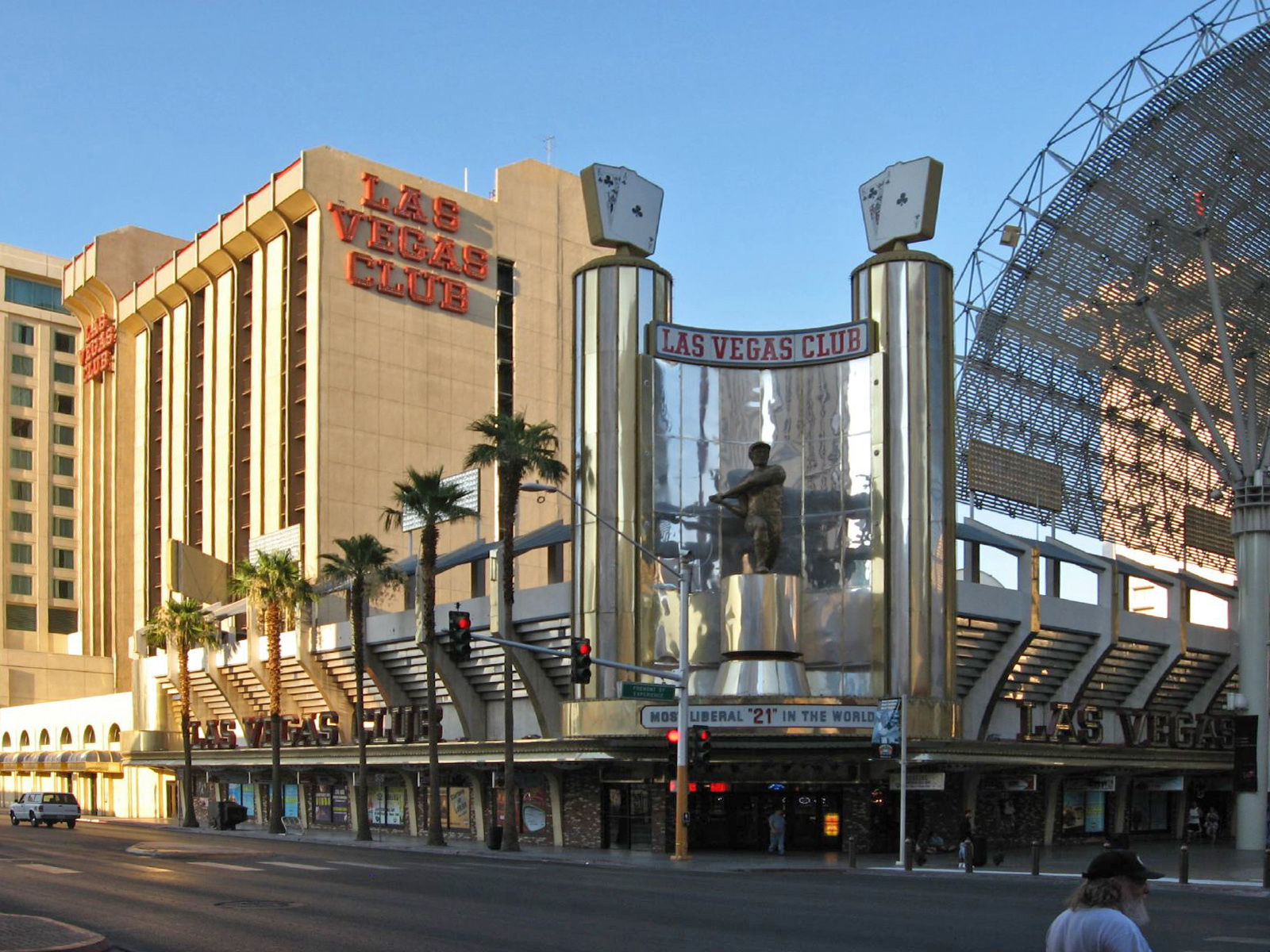
The Las Vegas Club.

Scherer moved to Las Vegas, Nevada, in 1939. With Chuck Addison, Bill Kurland and Milton B. Page, Scherer was a co-founder of the Pioneer Club, a casino in Las Vegas, in 1942. It was Lieutenant Governor Clifford A. Jones who helped them get a gambling license; in exchange for it, he received 5% of the casino. Scherer subsequently served as the president of El Rancho Vegas, another casino.

Scherer was an investor in the Las Vegas Club, the Thunderbird Hotel and the Sahara Hotel. By the 1950s, he was also an investor in the Lucky Strike Club, The Mint Las Vegas and the Las Vegas Club. In 1955, one of his partners in the Las Vegas Club, Arthur Shellang, was found dead in a suspicious suicide at his residence in Paradise Valley, Nevada.

Additionally, Scherer was a large real estate investor in Las Vegas, Nevada and California.

== Poetry ==
Scherer was appointed as the Poet Laureate of Nevada by Governor Charles H. Russell in 1950. Many of his poems were published in Magazine Las Vegas and Fabulous Las Vegas. In 1956, he published a collection of poems entitled Reminiscing in Rhyme illustrated by Crosby DeMoss.

== Personal life ==
Scherer was married four times. He married Laveeda Marie Varley on July 30, 1951. The couple divorced in 1952. In 1953, he married Judy Cauley, a 24-year-old former cocktail waitress from Lubbock, Texas. They resided on the corner of 10th Street and Charleston Boulevard in Las Vegas.

Scherer's mother-in-law, Mrs Mabel Monahan, was murdered in her house in Burbank, California, by burglars who thought she was hiding US$100,000 for Scherer on March 9, 1953. Six more murders followed hers, the last of which took place in 1958. Meanwhile, two men, John A. Santo and Emmitt R. Perkins, and a woman, Barbara Graham, were executed at the San Quentin State Prison by the state of California over her murder in 1955. Graham's story was later immortalized in the 1958 film I Want to Live!, in which she was portrayed by Susan Hayward. Hayward won an Oscar for her portrayal of Graham.

== Death and legacy ==
Scherer suffered a stroke in July 1957. He died of a stroke-related heart attack on August 19, 1957, at the Southern Nevada Memorial Hospital in Las Vegas, Nevada. He was 77 years old. By the time of his death, he was worth US$1 million, as well as real estate holdings in Nevada and California. His widow, Judy, inherited half his estate. One fourth of his estate was inherited by his daughter, Lolly Scherer, while another one fourth went to his son, Lord Bacon Scherer, also known as Tutor Taylor. Another daughter, Janna Lynn Scherer, inherited US$25,000.

In 2012, Scherer Street was named in his honor in Las Vegas.

== Works ==
- Scherer, L. B. (1956). Reminiscing in Rhyme: From a Collection of Illustrated Verse Originally Appearing in the Magazine "Las Vegas". Las Vegas, Nevada: [Privately printed by L.B. Scherer]. OCLC 24665444.
