= Columbine Poets of Colorado =

U.S. non-profit poetry association

- Established: 1978
- Type: Poetry organization
- Location: Denver, Colorado
- Website: www.columbinepoetsofcolorado.com

The Columbine Poets of Colorado is a non-profit state-level poetry association in the U.S. state of Colorado, affiliated with the National Federation of State Poetry Societies (NFSPS). The organization promotes poetry, conducts monthly and annual contests, issues poetry publications and organizes periodic workshops and festivals.

== History ==
insert a caption here

Columbine Poets was incorporated as a 501(c)(3) non-profit on May 11, 1978. The organization was first based in Ft. Collins, but later it moved to Denver when the Foothills Poets from the Foothills Art Center in Golden became the core membership. Membership currently runs between 90 and 100 members across the state of Colorado with two affiliate chapters: the Foothills Chapter, based in Denver, and the Shavano Chapter, based in Salida.

== Activities ==
Columbine Poets Inc. is an active state society with projects including sponsorship of both adult and student poetry contests annually. The Foothills Chapter in the Denver metropolitan area hosts weekly workshops on Saturday mornings. The society also sponsors a Poetry Festival annually with readings and workshops by well-known poets.

The organization has published 10 chapbooks from their national chapbook contests, and in 2008 the group published an anthology of members' poetry, titled Thirty Years or Thirty Miles From Here, which is available from booksellers.
