= Georgia Poetry Society =

Poetry association

- Abbreviation: GPS
- Established: 1979
- Type: Poetry organization
- Location: Atlanta, Georgia
- Website: georgiapoetrysociety.org

The Georgia Poetry Society (GPS) is a non-profit state-level poetry association in the U.S. state of Georgia, which is affiliated with the National Federation of State Poetry Societies (NFSPS). The organization promotes poetry, conducts monthly and annual contests, publishes poetry books and organizes periodic meetings, workshops and festivals.

== History ==
Cover of the 2011 anthology The Reach of Song

The Georgia Poetry Society was established in Atlanta on August 30, 1979 by Charles J. Bruehler and Edward Davin Vickers. Beginning with 30 charter members, the organization has expanded to about 200 members. In 1986 GPS received a supporting grant from the Georgia Council for the Arts, after which members established the Charles Dickson chapbook competition. The 2010 competition in honor of Ed Vickers led to publication of Under a Hundred poetry book. With support from the Coca-Cola company, the society held the Coca-Cola 1996 Centennial Olympic Games Poetry Contest and published the poems in an anthology titled Poetry in Motion.

In 1999 GPS hosted the National Federation of State Poetry Societies convention in Atlanta using the theme “A Peach of a Convention.” The conference was attended by nearly 250 poets from all parts of the United States. In 2004 GPS celebrated 25 years of service to poetry in the state of Georgia.

== Activities ==
The Georgia Poetry Society maintains a cycle of contests and publishes an annual anthology, titled The Reach of Song. GPS has established quarterly meetings to handle business, announce contest winners and hold poetry readings. It also publishes a newsletter and promotes poetry programs for youth. The Georgia Historical Society maintains the archives for the organization.

GPS currently maintains an Instagram, Facebook, and YouTube account.
