= Vitalist poetry =

Vitalist poetry is a genre developed in the 1970s by a group of poets seeking a more "vital" poetry.

A group of poets gathered round the magazine Littack (1972–1976) and the Littack Supplement (1976–1980). Vitalist poetry was defined in Littack Magazine and its supplement with publication of the Vitalist Memoranda and responses thereto by various hands, principally William Oxley, Peter Russell, Professor Anthony L. Johnson, Anthony Rudolf, Walter Perry and Richard Burns.

The Littack archive was sold at Sotherby's (London) on 19 July 1990 to the University of Texas at Austin.
