= Pennsylvania Poetry Society =

- Established: 1949
- Type: Poetry organization
- Location: Carlisle, Pennsylvania
- Website: www.nfsps.com/pa/

The Pennsylvania Poetry Society (PPS) is a non-profit state-level poetry association in the U.S. state of Pennsylvania, which is affiliated with the National Federation of State Poetry Societies (NFSPS). The organization promotes poetry, conducts monthly and annual contests, publishes poetry books and organizes periodic meetings, workshops and festivals.

== History ==
Cover of Prize Poems, 2020

The Pennsylvania Poetry Society (PPS), Inc. was founded October 21, 1949, growing out of the Pennsylvania Folklore Society and inaugurated by Colonel Henry W. Shoemaker and his sister, Blanche Shoemaker Wagstaff. PPS is a 501(c)(3) non-profit organization of poets involved in the craft of poetry at the local, state, and national levels. The mission of the Pennsylvania Poetry Society is "to secure fuller recognition for poetry, to foster a better appreciation of it, and to assist American poets in their craft." The society's historical archives are housed at the State Archives Building in Harrisburg, Pennsylvania.

== Activities ==
The Pennsylvania Poetry Society state affiliate chapters hold monthly workshops and meetings, sponsor a contest cycle and arrange for poetry readings, events and publication of anthologies featuring members' poems. The organization also promotes poetry in schools, colleges, retirement communities, and community programs. The PPS has hosted the NFSPS annual convention a number of times, including a conference in Philadelphia in 1960, in Carlisle in 1974, and Harrisburg in 2005.

The organization publishes a newsletter, the Sylvan (print and electronic formats), and a member-focused digital journal of poetry titled "Pennsylvania's Poetic Voices" (electronic format). In addition, the society publishes a traditional anthology of annual award-winning poems, titled "Firefly" (formerly called Prize Poems).
