= Illinois State Poetry Society =

U.S. non-profit state poetry society

- Established: 1991
- Type: Poetry organization
- Location: Chicago, Illinois
- Website: www.illinoispoets.org/index.htm

The Illinois State Poetry Society (ISPS) is a non-profit state-level poetry association in the U.S. state of Illinois, affiliated with the National Federation of State Poetry Societies (NFSPS). The organization promotes poetry through monthly and annual contests, publishes poetry books and organizes meetings, workshops and festivals.

== History ==
Cover of Distilled Voices 2018

The Illinois State Poetry Society was established in 1991 at the annual convention of the National Federation of State Poetry Societies held that year in Madison, Wisconsin. From 12 charter members, the organization has grown to a membership of about 150 and actively works to achieve its mission "to encourage the crafting and enjoyment of poetry in the State of Illinois..." The society currently has seven affiliate chapters.

== Activities ==
The ISPS publishes member poetry on its website, and a bimonthly newsletter. The society maintains a cycle of contests annually and publishes an anthology titled Distilled Voices. The society also organizes meetings, conferences, programs and poetry readings. The organization supports the institution of Poet Laureates within the state to promote the art of poetry.
