= Poetry Society of Tennessee =

U.S. non-profit organization

- Established: 1953
- Type: Poetry organization
- Location: Tennessee
- Website: www.poetrytennessee.org

The Poetry Society of Tennessee (PST) is a non-profit state-level poetry organization affiliated with the National Federation of State Poetry Societies. In 2020 it has three affiliate chapters in the U.S. state of Tennessee. The society hosts conferences and maintains award and educational programs related to poetry.

== History ==
Tennessee Voices Anthology 2017–2018: The Poetry Society of Tennessee, October 2, 2017

The Poetry Society of Tennessee was founded by poets in Memphis in 1953, and is recognized as the founding society in the State of Tennessee by the National Federation of State Poetry Societies (NFSPS). Since then, the organization has expanded to three affiliate chapters in West Tennessee, East Tennessee and Knoxville.

== Activities ==
The Poetry Society of Tennessee hosts a number of annual conferences, festivals and events and publishes the Tennessee Voices anthology annually. It also offers the NFSPS Critiquing Challenges, a discussion and educational opportunity for poet development.

The organization sponsors a number of contests that provide monthly and annual awards. The youth contests are open to all Tennessee students. Student award categories are:

- Elementary (Grades 2–5)
- Middle School (Grades 6–8)
- High School (Grades 9–12)
- Eye Poems (all age groups)
