= Massachusetts State Poetry Society =

- Established: 1976
- Type: Poetry organization
- Location: Lynn, Massachusetts
- Website: mastatepoetrysociety.tripod.com

The Massachusetts State Poetry Society (MSPS) is a non-profit state-level poetry organization affiliated with the National Federation of State Poetry Societies. It has affiliate chapters in the U.S. state of Massachusetts, where the society hosts events and conferences and maintains award and educational programs related to poetry.

== History ==
The Massachusetts State Poetry Society was incorporated as a 501(c)(3) nonprofit on November 30, 1976, in Lynn, Massachusetts, as a literary and educational organization dedicated to the appreciation and writing of poetry. The society currently has three affiliate chapteres.

== Activities ==
The MSPS sponsors an annual contest cycle for both adults and children, and presents awards for winning poems. The group publishes the Bay State Echo newsletter, which provides book reviews, craft articles, market lists, poems from members, and news about events and contest cycles. MSPS conducts "round robin" critiques among interested members and publishes a poetry anthology annually in December that showcases the work of members and contest award winners. The society also organizes and participates in cultural events in the community as opportunities to promote the art of poetry.
