= Louisiana State Poetry Society =

Poetry organization in Louisiana

- Established: 1954
- Type: Poetry organization
- Location: Baton Rouge, Louisiana
- Website: louisianastatepoetrysociety.org

The Louisiana State Poetry Society (LSPS) is a non-profit state-level poetry organization affiliated with the National Federation of State Poetry Societies. As of 2020, it has three affiliate chapters in the U.S. state of Louisiana. The society hosts events and conferences and maintains award and educational programs related to poetry.

== History ==
Louisiana State Poetry Society was inaugurated on October 9, 1954, by Mary Berthelot Wall and Ethel Harvey of Baton Rouge, Louisiana. Their mission in forming the society was "to promote and further the interest and appreciation of poetry and the poetic spirit".

Seeking to unify state poetry societies into a national organization, Mary Berthelot Wall went on to found the National Federation of State Poetry Societies on October 17, 1959.

== Activities ==
LSPS sponsors regular meetings and two conference events annually to bring members together and present the winners of the society's poetry bi-annual contests. The Spring Festival is held April to celebrate National Poetry Month, and the Fall Festival is held in mid-October to conduct the annual business meeting, observe National Poetry Day and celebrate the founding of the society.

The organization publishes The Poets' Gazette, the Society's official quarterly newsletter. In the past, LSPS has published anthologies including Lyric Louisiana (1955) and Lyric Louisiana 1960: An Anthology of Selected Poems Volume I and Volume II (1960).
