= Utah State Poetry Society =

- Established: 1950
- Type: Poetry organization
- Website: www.utahpoets.com/default.html

The Utah State Poetry Society (UTSPS) is a non-profit state-level poetry organization affiliated with the National Federation of State Poetry Societies. In 2020 it has eight affiliate chapters in the U.S. state of Utah. The society hosts conferences and maintains award and educational programs related to poetry.

== History ==
Utah Sings: An Anthology of Contemporary Poetry, May 8, 2015

The Utah State Poetry Society was established by C. Cameron Johns and six other members on May 6, 1950. The organization was incorporated as a 501(c)(3) non-profit corporation in the State of Utah on October 18, 1963, and currently has seven affiliated chapters.

== Activities ==
The USPA offers workshops, contests, critique groups, an annual Poetry Festival in April, a summer conference and a fall Book Concert. The organization also fosters small writing and critique groups and accepts manuscripts for the UTSPS Critique Bureau. Annual contests and awards include the UTSPS Contest and the Chaparral Poetry Contest.

The society publishes the UTSPS Poet Tree newsletter, the Panorama and other publications including the 2015 anthology Utah Sings.
