= Poetry Society of Oklahoma =

Poet society in Oklahoma

- Established: 1934
- Type: Poetry organization
- Location: Oklahoma
- Website: www.angelfire.com/poetry/pso/

The Poetry Society of Oklahoma (PSO) is a non-profit state-level poetry association in the U.S. state of Oklahoma. The organization is affiliated with the National Federation of State Poetry Societies (NFSPS), and promotes poetry, conducts monthly and annual contests, publishes poetry books and organizes periodic meetings, workshops and festivals.

== History ==
Red Earth Revisited, 2015 anthology of the Poetry Society of Oklahoma

The Poetry Society of Oklahoma was established February 9, 1934, by literary editor Zoe Tilghman, who invited 30 poets to meet at the YMCA library in Oklahoma City. The group approved a plan for the poetry society and elected officers a month later. Tilghman served as the first president of the organization.

In 1969 PSO sponsored their first Statewide Youth Poetry Contest for Oklahoma Public School students. The society affiliated with NFSPS in 1971 and incorporated as a non-profit on January 11, 1985. The organization has hosted the NFSPS national convention in 1968, 1989 and 2007. The society features six past Poet Laureates of Oklahoma as members, including: Bess Truitt, Rudolph Hill, Leslie McRill, Carol Hamilton, Carl Sennhenn and Eddie Wilcoxen.

== Activities ==
PSO sponsors an annual awards cycle and hosts an Awards Banquet in March where awards are announced and the winning poems read. In 2003 the organization began honoring an annual Poet Laureate at the banquet. PSO observes October 15 as Poetry Day and also organizes and sponsors other events during the year. In 2007 the society hosted the annual NSFPS conference in Oklahoma City. The organization publishes a bi-monthly newsletter, the Oklahoma Rose and publishes periodic anthologies of member poetry.

Poems by PSO members are featured at the Oklahoma City National Memorial & Museum.
