= Arizona State Poetry Society =

Literary society

- Established: 1965
- Type: Poetry organization
- Website: azpoetry.webs.com

The Arizona State Poetry Society (ASPS) is a non-profit state-level poetry organization affiliated with the National Federation of State Poetry Societies (NFSPS). The society hosts conferences and maintains award and educational programs related to poetry.

== History ==
The Arizona State Poetry Society (ASPS) is a state-wide, non-profit organization established in 1965 and is open to poets within the state of Arizona as well as out of state poets. The society was formed by some of the same people that established the University of Arizona Poetry Center and the two remain associated. Their mission is to stimulate a fine and intelligent appreciation of poetry, to encourage the writing and reading of poetry, and to further the goals of the National Federation of State Poetry Societies in securing fuller public recognition of the art of poetry. In 2020, the organization had four regional affiliates in the state of Arizona: Scottsdale Mustang Poets, Tucson Poetry Society, East Valley Poetry Society, and West Valley Poets. ASPS encourages their members to post and link their published poetry collections as well.

Cover of the 2014 Sandcutters poetry anthology.

== Activities ==
ASPS operates monthly and annual poetry contests, featuring 10-14 categories for the annual contest and three individual categories in January, March, May, July and September for member only contests {https://azpoetry.net/contests/#MemberContest}. The categories include a variety of formats and topics, and winners are awarded cash prizes. The organization is a member of the National Federation of State Poetry Societies and supports their national contests {http://www.nfsps.com/poetry_contests.htm}. The society publishes a quarterly newsletter, The Desert Voice. The annual anthology, "Sandcutters", features the annual contest prize-winning poems, member winners in the bimonthly contests, member artwork, curated member poetry, and a featured Arizona poet. The anthology is available from the online store.
