= Nevada Poetry Society =

American non-profit poetry association

Nevada Poetry Association
- Established: 1961
- Type: Poetry organization
- Location: Nevada
- Website: www.nfsps.com

The Nevada Poetry Association (OPA) is a non-profit state-level poetry association in the U.S. state of Nevada, which is affiliated with the National Federation of State Poetry Societies (NFSPS). The organization promotes poetry, conducts contests, publishes poetry books and organizes periodic meetings, workshops and festivals.

== History ==
The Nevada Poetry Society was established by Mildred Breedlove in 1961, and has sponsored and developed poets over the years since. The society's archives are housed at the University of Nevada, Las Vegas. University Libraries.

== Activities ==
The Nevada Poetry Society promotes poetry in the state, conducts an annual cycle of contests, publishes poetry anthologies and organizes periodic conferences, meetings, workshops and festivals. The society releases member publications, and has also published calendars and a cookbook. The organization has been a strong supporter for a Nevada state Poet Laureate.
