= Connecticut Poetry Society =

U.S. non-profit organization

- Established: 1974
- Type: Poetry organization
- Location: Connecticut
- Website: www.ctpoetry.net/index.html

The Connecticut Poetry Society (CPS) is a non-profit state-level poetry association in the U.S. state of Connecticut, affiliated with the National Federation of State Poetry Societies (NFSPS). The organization promotes poetry, conducts monthly and annual contests, issues poetry publications, and organizes periodic workshops and festivals.

The society was established in 1974 and in 1985, incorporated as a non-profit, tax-exempt organization and adopted a revised constitution.

== History ==
Cover of the 2020 Connecticut River Review

The Connecticut Poetry Society was established on October 4, 1974, at the Hartford Public Library, including approximately 15 charter members. CPS was affiliated with the National Federation of Poetry societies in 1975. In 1976, the organization launched the first poetry contest, known as the Joseph E. Brodine Memorial Poetry Awards.

In 1978, the Connecticut River Review journal published its first volume of poetry under editor Candace Catlin Hall. In 2008, CPS established its website and began an online presence. It currently has 12 affiliate chapters.

== Activities ==
CPS operates a number of monthly and annual poetry contests and arranges workshops, readings, and festivals. The organization publishes a quarterly newsletter, the Connecticut Poetry Society Newsletter, and a poetry journal, titled Connecticut River Review.
