= Laura Evans (sex worker) =

Old west sex worker (1871 - 1953)

- Born: Alice Chapel Reed; May 31, 1871; St. Louis, Missouri or Mobile, Alabama
- Died: April 4, 1953 (aged 81); Salida, Colorado
- Other names: Laura Evens, Alice Chapel Reed
- Occupation: Sex worker
- Children: Lucille Evans

Laura Evans, (May 31, 1871 – April 4, 1953), sometimes spelled Evens, was born Alice Chapel Reed. She was Salida's most prominent madam and a famous sex worker in the Old West.

== Biography ==
There are conflicting records of Evans' birthday. According to cemetery records, she was born May 31, 1874, but her obituary in the Salida Daily Mail-Record notes that she was born May 31, 1871 in St. Louis, Missouri. It was also possible she was born May 31, 1871 on a farm in Mobile, Alabama.

Evans became a sex worker in the 1890s. She got married at 17 years old to John Cooper Evans, Jr. They had a baby daughter, Lucille. She left her husband and daughter, and changed her name to move to Missouri. She took the name Laura after her husband's sister. She intended to go to Hong Kong with another sex worker named Nora Kirk, but Kirk was killed by one of her clients.

=== Expanded description ===
She likely began her career in St. Louis, Missouri, in 1890, and within a few years traveled west to the red light district of Denver, Colorado. She was known as a prankster, and her wild escapades kept her name in the press.

Evans became known as a sex worker in Leadville, Colorado, in 1894. She left Leadville in 1896, after she was involved in strike breaking during a labor dispute. The Maid of Erin mine laborers were on strike, and Evans smuggled payroll into the strike breakers. She was blacklisted and forced to leave Leadville.

She settled in Salida, Colorado, in January 1896, where she worked her way up to be madam of her parlor house. She became a full time madam and owned her own parlor house by 1900. In 1906, she bought a small apartment building with six units.

In 1918 during the flu pandemic, Evans and her employees took care of the sick, often using nursing costumes so that the patients did not realize they were sex workers.

Evans' parlor was closed in 1950 by Salida town council. She then used the space to rent out rooms to local workers. The city asked her to reopen when sexual assault crimes increased, but she was content with renting rooms to railroad workers and playing cards.

=== Personal life ===
She was known for her love of her dog, Mister Pimp Powers. He was a brown and black, well-tempered chihuahua. Lillian "Lil" Powers was another sex worker, and she sent the dog to Evans in a box, possibly as a going away gift as Powers left Salida.

Evans was known as an "outgoing, outspoken woman and prankster". She cared for her community, and often had groceries delivered anonymously to families in need. She had an extensive doll collection, and some were gifts of appreciation from clients.

Evans had a daughter, Lucille, who wrote and distributed a "defamatory circular" that denigrated prominent residents of Salida. She felt contempt for her mother because of neglect.

=== Death and legacy ===
Evans died on April 4, 1953.

Her tombstone is in Fairview Cemetery, and her last name is misspelled as Evens.

After her death, her daughter donated the building to the Monarch Shrine.

== In popular culture ==
Buena Vista Heritage Museum in Buena Vista, Colorado, has a performance called "Madams of Central Colorado" in which Laura Evans is one of the main characters.
