= Maine Poets Society =

- Established: 1936
- Type: Poetry organization
- Location: Randolph, Maine
- Website: www.mainepoetssociety.com

The Maine Poets Society (MPS) is a non-profit state-level poetry organization affiliated with the National Federation of State Poetry Societies. It has affiliate chapters in the U.S. state of Maine, where the society hosts events and conferences and maintains award and educational programs related to poetry.

== History ==
Coming Home Twice anthology, 2005

The Maine Poets Society was established in 1936 when the Waterville Poets Club and the Dover-Foxcroft Poetry Circle merged to form the Poetry Fellowship of Maine. In 1993 the organization changed its name to Maine Poets Society to better reflect the organization's changing mission to a statewide network of writers sharing their interests.

In 1985 MPS incorporated as a 501(c)(3) non-profit organization affiliated with the National Federation of State Poetry Societies, and members receive the benefits of national membership, including access to newsletters, publication opportunities, events and contests.

== Activities ==
MPS offers regularly scheduled conferences, meetings, events and workshops for members and an annual contest cycle with opportunities for awards and publication. The society publishes a newsletter titled Stanza that provides news and information on events and publishes winners of the poetry contests. In addition, the society publishes poetry anthologies presenting the work of members.

The organization offers Opportunity Grants on a first-come basis for poets interested in educational events or residencies.
