= Poetry Society of Indiana =

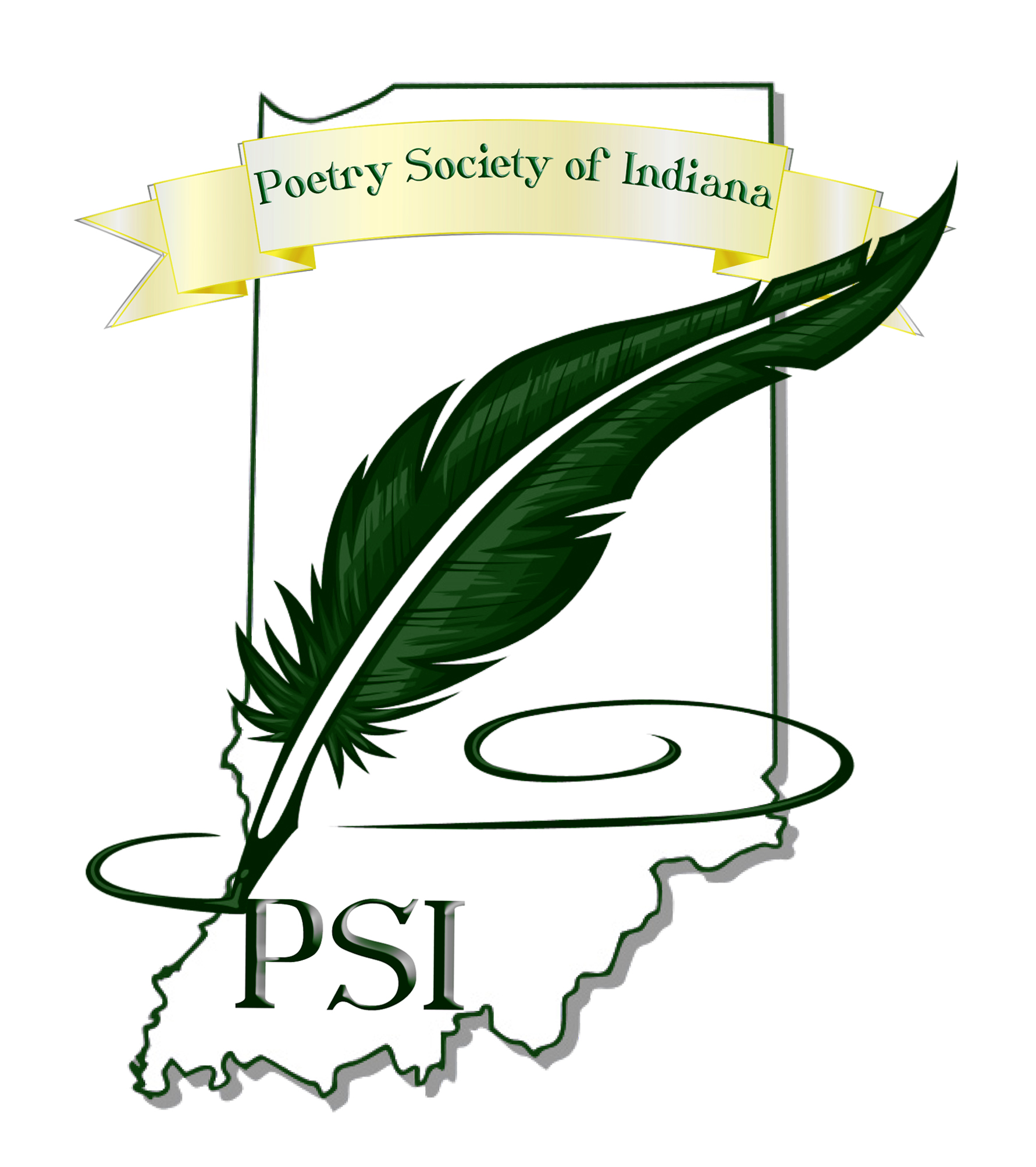
- Abbreviation: PSI
- Established: 1941
- Type: Poetry organization
- Location: Indiana, U.S.
- Website: poetrysocietyofindiana.org

The Poetry Society of Indiana (PSI) is an all-volunteer 501(c)(3) non-profit state-level poetry association in the U.S. state of Indiana, which is affiliated with the National Federation of State Poetry Societies (NFSPS). The organization promotes poetry, conducts monthly meetings and annual contests, publishes poetry books and organizes periodic workshops and festivals.

== About ==
The Poetry Society of Indiana is an all-volunteer non-profit 501(c)(3) poetry organization in Indiana. Formerly known as Indiana State Federation of Poetry Clubs, it was first established on May 31, 1941, and included 25 charter members; it was incorporated as a non-profit in 1980 as the Indiana State Federation of Poetry Clubs. In 2016 the organization changed its name to Poetry Society of Indiana and extended its outreach throughout the state. Poetry Society of Indiana membership consists of individual poet members and local poetry groups.

In 1978, the organization inaugurated its PSI Annual Poetry Contest, which now has over 25 poem categories. The winners of the PSI Annual Poetry Contest are announced at the annual PSI Fall Rendezvous Convention.

The annual PSI Spring Fling Convention includes announcing the winners of the annual PSI Members-Only Spring Fling Poetry Contest. PSI published its first newsletter bulletin Indiana Poet on August 1, 1942.

== Activities ==
The Poetry Society of Indiana hosts:

- the PSI Annual Poetry Contest that offers over $1800 in prize moneys (total). The contest consists of at least 25 different categories sponsored by local poetry groups and/or individuals
- annual PSI Spring Fling Convention, a one-day event in April
- annual PSI Fall Rendezvous Convention, a weekend event in October
- annual PSI Young Voices Poetry Contest, open state-wide to public, private, and homeschool students in grades 3–12
- annual state-level Manningham Trust Student Poetry Contest (MTSPC). Poetry Society of Indiana announces state-level winners. The highest awards advance to the national Manningham Contest, sponsored by National Federation of State Poetry Societies (NFSPS).
- monthly PSI Members-only meetings, and members-only poetry contests and collaborative poetry opportunities
- other various public workshops and events.

Since 1945, PSI has also nominated an unofficial state's PSI Premier Poet.

PSI publishes the Indiana Poet newsletter four times a year, including PSI contests & events information, other PSI activities, and local and state-level poetry news. PSI also publishes an annual print anthology of the winners of its PSI Annual Poetry Contest, titled Ink to Paper, and in 2017 it released a 75th-anniversary collection and history, called Diamonds..
