= Poetry Society of Texas =

- Established: 1921
- Type: Poetry organization
- Location: Dallas, Texas
- Website: poetrysocietyoftexas.org/about/history/basic-history

The Poetry Society of Texas (PST) is one of the oldest (if not the oldest) non-profit state-level poetry associations in the U.S. state of Texas, affiliated with the National Federation of State Poetry Societies. The organization promotes poetry, conducts monthly and annual contests, issues annual poetry publications and organizes periodic conferences.

== History ==
The Poetry Society of Texas was established in Dallas, Texas, on November 5, 1921, prompted mainly by poet Therese Lindsey, and chartered January 26, 1922. Since then, the organization has grown to be one of the largest state poetry associations in the United States with membership including numerous chapters and over 200 poets. Its mission is to encourage the recognition, writing and appreciation of poetry.

Poetry Society of Texas' annual poetry publication A Book of the Year

The society has published poetry books annually since 1922, featuring the year's prize-winning poetry. The archive of the PST publications is housed in the Dallas Public Library, including numerous volumes from the society and its members.

== Activities ==
The society celebrates an annual Poetry Day on October 15, first proclaimed in 1947 by Governor Beauford Jester. Activities on this date include workshops, contests and poetry readings. The society also operates a podcast and observes National Poetry Month in April. PST holds an annual conference and has hosted the Federation of State Poetry Societies Annual Convention five times since affiliating in 1965.

PST conducts a number of contests and presents awards for both adult and children's poetry, and presents the adult awards at an annual Awards Banquet held in November. Awards for children's poetry are presented at a Student Festival held annually in May. The society issues an annual poetry publication, A Book of the Year, and also releases other publications, such as the anthology A Texas Garden of Verses, published in 2014.
