= WyoPoets =

U.S. non-profit organization

- Established: 1996
- Type: Poetry organization
- Location: Cheyenne, Wyoming
- Website: www.wyopoets.org

The WyoPoets is a non-profit state-level poetry organization in the U.S. state of Wyoming, affiliated with the National Federation of State Poetry Societies. The society promotes the writing and appreciation of poetry, hosts conferences, releases poetry publications and maintains poetry awards and educational programs.

== History ==
Labyrinth poetry chapbook published by the WyoPoets, January 1, 2016

In 1977 Florence Rubert Rossi was instrumental in organizing the state's poets and affiliating with the NFSPS. At that time, the organization was known as Poets of Wyoming Writers (PWW). The group separated from Wyoming Writers in 1996 and formed a new poets' organization with a membership of about 70. This organization incorporated in 2004 as WyoPoets, a 501(c)(3) organization, and retained its affiliation with the National Federation of State Poetry Societies.

== Activity ==
WyoPoets aims to provide mutual help and inspiration to foster an interest in poetry throughout the state of Wyoming. This includes activities like writing, workshops, publishing, studying, and sharing poetry in its many forms. The organization began celebrating April as National Poetry Month in 1996 when the event was organized.

Over the years, seven members of WyoPoets have served as Poet Laureates of the State of Wyoming. The organization sponsors contests and awards, and publishes poetry chapbooks periodically. Contests include: the Eugene V. Shea National Poetry Contest, a Members-Only Chapbook Contest and a Members-Only Contest for poetry.
