= Oregon Poetry Association =

Literary association

- Established: 1956
- Type: Poetry organization
- Location: Oregon
- Website: oregonpoets.org

The Oregon Poetry Association (OPA) is a non-profit state-level poetry association in the U.S. state of Oregon, which is affiliated with the National Federation of State Poetry Societies (NFSPS). The organization promotes poetry, conducts monthly and annual contests, publishes poetry books and organizes periodic meetings, workshops and festivals.

== History ==
Cover of the 2020 Cascadia

The Oregon Poetry Association was founded in 1956 and is Oregon's oldest literary society. The organization grew out of the Verseweavers Poetry Society, founded in 1936. The OPA incorporated as the Oregon State Poetry Association and created the constitution and by-laws in April 1956, and conducted the first annual meeting in April 1957. The organization changed its name to Oregon Poetry Association in 2011, and currently has about 350 members.

Association president David Hedges revitalized the society between the years of 1982–1983, initiating Poetry Day readings, the Student Poetry Contest and the Family Poetry Workshop Project.

== Activities ==
The Oregon Poetry Association hosts an annual fall meeting and conference that provides workshops, poetry sessions, and a luncheon. The society operates an annual spring and fall adult poetry contest cycle and also offers a free annual poetry contest for K-12 children. The OPA publishes the annual anthology Cascadia in late spring to showcase winning poems from the year's student contest, and Verseweavers, which showcases the work of adult contest winners.

Oregon State Library has partnered with OPA to establish and maintain the Oregon Poetry Collection now held at the Knight Library at the University of Oregon.
