= New Mexico State Poetry Society =

- Established: 1969
- Type: Poetry organization
- Location: Santa Fe, New Mexico
- Website: www.nmpoetry.com/wp/

The New Mexico State Poetry Society (MSPS) is a non-profit state-level poetry association in the U.S. state of New Mexico, which is affiliated with the National Federation of State Poetry Societies (NFSPS). The organization promotes poetry, conducts monthly and annual contests, publishes poetry books and organizes periodic meetings, workshops and festivals.

== History ==
Poetry from the Other Side, 2013 poetry anthology from the New Mexico State Poetry Society, Albuquerque chapter

The New Mexico State Poetry Society (NMSPS) was established by poet Alice Briley on March 19, 1969, in Albuquerque, New Mexico. In October charter members met to elect officers and adopt a constitution. The group set up monthly meetings. In the same year, the society was designated the official state affiliate by the NFSPS. The organization was incorporated in Santa Fe as a 501(c)(3) nonprofit on December 7, 1976, and currently has five affiliate chapters in the state.

== Activities ==
The NMSPS sponsors meetings, events, an annual contest cycle and publication of members' poetry. Special projects may receive grant funding. Current projects include: Poets in the Classroom, Poets in the Garden, Poets’ Picnic and Speak with the Poet. The society hosts an Annual Meeting & Poetry Celebration in October, and sponsors publication of members' poetry. The organization supported the efforts that led to establishment of a State Poet Laureate position in 2019.
