= Poetry Society of Michigan =

- Established: 1933
- Type: Poetry organization
- Location: Cadillac, Michigan
- Website: poetrysocietyofmichigan.wordpress.com

The Poetry Society of Michigan (PSM) is a non-profit state-level poetry association in the U.S. state of Michigan, which is affiliated with the National Federation of State Poetry Societies (NFSPS). The organization promotes poetry, conducts monthly and annual contests, publishes poetry books and organizes periodic meetings, workshops and festivals.

== History ==
I Hear the Song and It Wells in Me, 2005 anthology from Poetry Society of Michigan

The Poetry Society of Michigan was established in 1933 and incorporated as a 501(c)(3) nonprofit organization in 1976 in Cadillac, Michigan. The society's historical archives are housed at Clarke Historical Library Central Michigan University. The society currently has 11 affiliate chapters around the state.

== Activities ==
The PSM sponsors annual poetry contests and encourages young people to read and write poetry. The organization holds regular meetings and events in the state during the spring, summer and fall. The society publishes the quarterly literary magazine Peninsula Poets, which showcases member and award winners' poetry, and a regular 5 -year anthology of members' work. Members' work is also published regularly on PSM's website.
