= Missouri State Poetry Society =

- Established: 1988
- Type: Poetry organization
- Location: Missouri
- Website: mostatepoetry.com/index.html

The Missouri State Poetry Society (MSPS) is a non-profit state-level poetry association in the U.S. state of Missouri, which is affiliated with the National Federation of State Poetry Societies (NFSPS). The organization promotes poetry, conducts monthly and annual contests, publishes poetry books and organizes periodic meetings, workshops and festivals.

== History ==
Grist, 2017 anthology published by the Missouri State Poetry Society

The Missouri State Poetry Society grew out of Missouri Poets & Friends, an organization formed on June 16, 1988, but Derlyne Gibson, an employee of Southwest Missouri State University in Springfield. First meetings were in the homes of members, then At Christ Episcopal Church and then the New Age Books and Gifts store. The eventual location for the group was Brentwood Library. By 1989 the society had affiliated with the National Federation of State Poetry Societies. In 1998 the organization revised their constitution and approved new Articles of Organization and chartered as MSPS, a 501(c)(3) nonprofit, on November 1, 1998. By 2012 there were eight affiliated chapters.

== Activities ==
The MSPS conducts four major state-wide activities: a fall convention, a winter contest, a spring anthology and a summer contest. The society publishes a quarterly newsletter titled Spare Mule and an annual anthology called Grist, which showcase member and contest winners' poetry. The society also sponsors other events, including workshops and readings of member's poetry.
