= Mississippi Poetry Society =

- Established: 1932
- Type: Poetry organization
- Location: Gautier, Mississippi
- Website: www.misspoetry.net

The Mississippi Poetry Society (MPS) is a non-profit state-level poetry association in the U.S. state of Mississippi, which is affiliated with the National Federation of State Poetry Societies (NFSPS). The organization promotes poetry, conducts monthly and annual contests, publishes poetry books and organizes periodic meetings, workshops and festivals.

== History ==
Mississippi Poetry Journal 2020, literary journal from the Mississippi Poetry Society

The Mississippi Poetry Society was founded in 1932 when eleven charter members met at Belhaven College in Jackson, Mississippi. The society was established as the Belhaven Poetry Society and elected Elizabeth Newman of the Belhaven English Department as the first president. Early meetings were held in the municipal Art Gallery. The organization incorporated as a 501(c)(3) nonprofit in Gautier, Mississippi in 1981.

== Activities ==
The Mississippi Poetry Society was established to foster interest in writing poetry and organizes meetings, contests, school programs and festivals, with opportunities for both adult and youth poets. The MPS names a poet of the year. The society publishes an online newsletter titled The Magnolia Muse and publishes the Mississippi Poetry Journal to showcase poetry from members and contest winners.
