= National Federation of State Poetry Societies =

American organization of state poetry societies

- Established: 1959
- Type: Poetry organization
- Website: www.nfsps.net

The National Federation of State Poetry Societies, Inc. (NFSPS) is a national organization of state poetry societies in the United States. It was established in 1959 and now includes affiliates in 32 U.S. states. The federation hosts conferences and maintains awards and educational programs related to poetry.

== History ==
The National Federation of State Poetry Societies was established in Baton Rouge on October 17, 1959, by Mary B. Wall. The first conference was held in conjunction with the Louisiana State Poetry Society where national officers were elected. A constitution was adopted in Philadelphia in 1960, and the organization was incorporated in Madison, Wisconsin, in July 1966. The federation included 10 state affiliates at that time. By 2020 that number had grown to 32.

== Activities ==
Encore Prize Poems 2019, July 6, 2019

The NFSPS normally sponsors fifty annual poetry contests offering cash prizes, including a grand prize of $1,000. It also sponsors the Stevens Manuscript contest for a collection of poems by one poet, the BlackBerry Peach Poetry Awards, and the College Undergraduate Poetry competition. All members of the national organization are members of an NFSPS-affiliated state organization. The Federation encourages and supports the institution of Poets Laureate in the various cities and states.

The federation publishes the Strophes official newsletter quarterly, which provides both national and state society news. The newsletter also announces contests and awards and lists current state presidents and board members. NFSPS conducts an annual national convention to handle business and offer poetry workshops and presentations. The Federation Library Collection is housed at Baylor University in Waco, Texas, and includes the Encore poetry anthologies published annually by NFSPS.

== Affiliates ==
- Alabama State Poetry Society
- Arizona State Poetry Society
- Poets Roundtable of Arkansas
- Columbine Poets of Colorado
- Connecticut Poetry Society
- Florida State Poets Association
- Georgia Poetry Society
- Illinois State Poetry Society
- Poetry Society of Indiana
- Iowa Poetry Association
- Sunflower Poetry Society of Kansas
- Kentucky State Poetry Society
- Louisiana State Poetry Society
- Maine Poets Society
- Massachusetts State Poetry Society
- Poetry Society of Michigan
- League of Minnesota Poets
- Mississippi Poetry Society
- Missouri State Poetry Society
- Nevada Poetry Society
- New Mexico State Poetry Society
- North Dakota State Poetry Society
- Poetry Society of Oklahoma
- Oregon Poetry Association
- Pennsylvania Poetry Society
- South Dakota State Poetry Society
- Poetry Society of Tennessee
- Poetry Society of Texas
- Utah State Poetry Society
- Poetry Society of Virginia
- WyoPoets (Wyoming)

=== Alabama State Poetry Society ===
Cover of The Sampler, 1986

The Alabama State Poetry Society (ASPS) is a non-profit state-level poetry association in the U.S. state of Alabama which is affiliated with the National Federation of State Poetry Societies. The organization promotes poetry, conducts biannual contests, and organizes workshops, meetings, readings and other events.

The Alabama State Poetry Society was founded in 1968 and incorporated as a 501 (c)(3) non-profit in 2015. The organization is based in Huntsville and is affiliated with the National Federation of State Poetry Societies. ASPS welcomes both new and active poets who write, publish and participate in readings and slams.

ASPS conducts Spring and Fall meetings where poets meet and read their work, and sponsors programs and workshops to improve writing abilities through local readings and critique groups. ASPS also sponsors two rounds of poetry contests annually that feature cash prizes.

ASPS publishes a quarterly newsletter, the Muse Messenger, which features articles on writing, publishing opportunities, news about poetry events and publications, and contest information. In the past, the society published an annual anthology, called The Sampler.

=== Poets Roundtable of Arkansas ===
Cover of the 80th anniversary anthology from Poets Roundtable of Arkansas, 2013.

Poets Roundtable of Arkansas (PRA) is a non-profit state-level poetry association in the U.S. state of Arkansas, affiliated with the National Federation of State Poetry Societies (NFSPS). The organization promotes poetry, conducts monthly and annual contests, issues poetry publications and organizes periodic meetings and conferences.

The Poets Roundtable of Arkansas was founded on February 5, 1931, by a group of seven women interested in developing as poets. The group was originally named Round Table Poets. The PRA adopted its current name on July 25, 1939, and is currently a 501(c)(3) nonprofit organization.

PRA is an affiliate member of the National Federation of State Poetry Societies. In 2020 PRA had ten affiliate branches in Arkansas. The archives of the organization are stored at the Butler Center for Arkansas Studies.

PRA hosts contests, study groups, an annual workshop, and celebrates National Poetry Day annually in October. It publishes a quarterly newsletter, the News 'N' Notes. In 2013 the PRA published a retrospective of 80 years of members' poetry.
