= Kentucky State Poetry Society =

- Established: 1965
- Type: Poetry organization
- Website: kystatepoetrysociety.org

The Kentucky State Poetry Society (KSPS) is a non-profit state-level poetry organization affiliated with the National Federation of State Poetry Societies. The society hosts conferences and maintains award and educational programs related to poetry.

== History ==
The Kentucky State Poetry Society was established in 1965 at a meeting of the Eastern Kentucky Poetry Society in Ashland, Kentucky, and in 1966 the organization joined the National Federation of State Poetry Societies. The first annual conference was held October 16, 1967, at the Henry Clay Hotel in Ashland. Soon after that, membership expanded to over 500 members

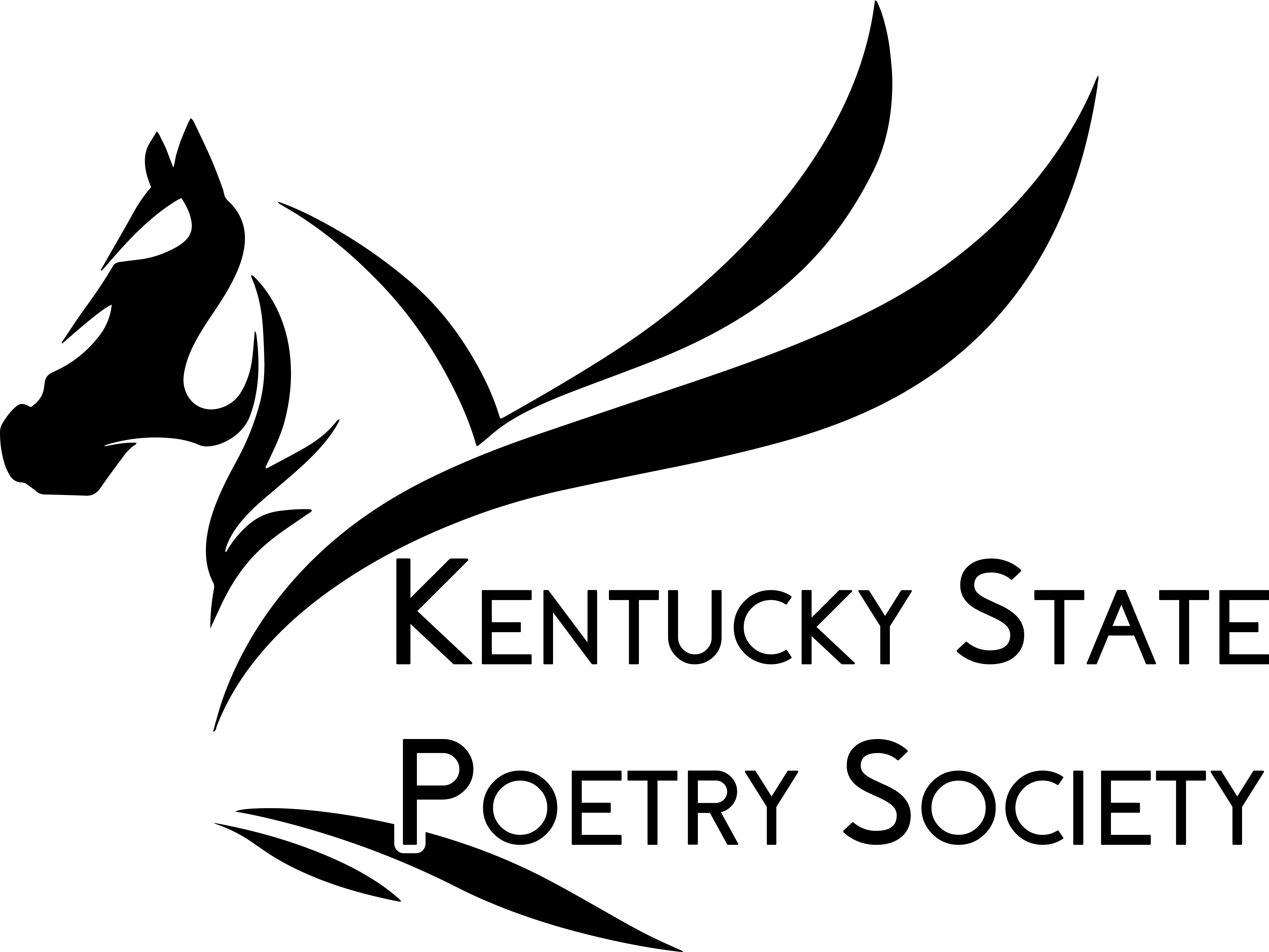

The first Pegasus poetry journal was published in 1966 with four pages of poetry, but by 1970 the periodical had expanded and established a publishing schedule of two times a year.

The records of the KSPS are archived at Eastern Kentucky Kentucky in Richmond, KY.

Besides the Pegasus literary journal, the society provides information on society events, news, members' news and publications.
