= Florida State Poets Association =

U.S. non-profit organization

Florida State Poets Society
- Established: 1974
- Type: Poetry organization
- Website: flpoets.org

The Florida State Poets Association Inc. (FSPA) is a non-profit literary association chartered in the U.S. state of Florida and affiliated with the National Federation of State Poetry Societies The association fosters poetry in the state and helps select the Florida State Poet Laureate.

== History ==
The Florida State Poets Association was founded as a non-profit in October 1974 by Henrietta Kroah and Hans Juergensen. The society affiliated with the National Federation of State Poetry Societies in the same year, and was chartered by the State of Florida in 1979.

Cadence 2020: Florida State Poets Association Anthology 38, October 22, 2020

Beginning with a single chapter in Deland, the association grew to include ten chapters in 2020. Including members-at-large, the membership included more than 200 poets in that year. In 2015 the society hosted the NSFPA national conference in the city of St. Petersburg.

== Activities ==
The association organizes biannual poetry conferences in the state. In 2015 FSPA established a Chancellor Program, which identifies poets of esteem for attendance at events and conferences, and established a Speaker Bureau to provide poetry presenters on request. The society was instrumental in inauguration of a Poet Laureate position in the State of Florida, and maintains Chairs for Youth Contests, Student Contests, and a Slam poetry coordinator. It operates an annual national contest and publishes the Cadence anthology that presents the contest winners and selected submissions of poetry and photography from around the state.

In 2015 FSPA accredited The 12 Chairs education program established by member Al Rocheleau. The program provides a three-year intensive poetry curriculum that has been adopted by English teachers throughout Florida.
