= South Dakota State Poetry Society =

- Established: 1927
- Type: Poetry organization
- Location: Brookings, South Dakota
- Website: sdpoetry.org

The South Dakota State Poetry Society (SDSPS) is a non-profit state-level poetry association in the U.S. state of South Dakota, affiliated with the National Federation of State Poetry Societies (NFSPS). The organization promotes poetry, conducts state-wide contests, issues poetry publications and organizes periodic workshops and festivals.

== History ==
The South Dakota State Poetry Society was founded in 1927 by Dr. James C. Lindberg at Northern State University after serving as editor of the college's literary magazine Pasque Petals the previous year. The organization incorporated as a 501(c)(3) nonprofit in 1984, with a mission statement that reads, in part: "To encourage and foster the writing and publication of poetry by South Dakota writers and to promote excellence therein."

== Activities ==
October 1999 Pasque Petals literary poetry journal

The SDSPS organizes and supports poetry events and readings around the state, in communities, schools, and prisons, and hosts a website that provides up-to-date information on activities and opportunities for members. The society has a board of up to fifteen members that selects the editor for the literary journal Pasque Petals, oversees the organization's annual state-wide poetry contests, and assists in planning for the South Dakota Festival of Books. SDSPS has also recommended candidates for South Dakota Poet Laureate to the state's Governor since 1959.

The Pasque Petals is the oldest poetry journal sponsored by a state poetry society in continuous publication within the National Federation of State Poetry Societies. The journal began as a mimeographed monthly publication, and has grown to a high-quality professional release that presents poetry in a variety of forms and styles from local, national and international contributors. Since 2010 the society has also published poetry chapbooks selected through a competition. The SDSPS achieves are stored in the Hilton M. Briggs Library at South Dakota State University.
