= Koyanovo =

Koyanovo (Russian: Кояново) is the name of several rural localities in Russia:

- Koyanovo, Perm Krai, village in Permsky District, Perm Krai
- Koyanovo, Birsky District, Republic of Bashkortostan, village in Birsky District, Republic of Bashkortostan
- Koyanovo, Kaltasinsky District, Republic of Bashkortostan, village in Kaltasinsky District, Republic of Bashkortostan
