= Kozloyalovo =

Kozloyalovo Козлоялово
- Village
- Location within Bashkortostan Location within Russia
- Coordinates: 56°02′N 54°33′E
- Country: Russia
- Region: Bashkortostan
- District: Kaltasinsky District
- Time zone: UTC+5:00

Kozloyalovo (Russian: Козлоялово; Bashkir: Ҡуҙлыял, Quźlıyal) is a rural locality (a village) in Amzibashevsky Selsoviet, Kaltasinsky District, Bashkortostan, Russia. The population was 151 as of 2010. There are 3 streets.

== Geography ==
Kozloyalovo is located 24 km (15 mi) northwest of Kaltasy (the district's administrative centre) by road. Chashkino is the nearest rural locality.
