= U-Yal =

U-Yal У-Ял
- Village
- Location within Bashkortostan Location within Russia
- Coordinates: 56°03′N 54°48′E
- Country: Russia
- Region: Bashkortostan
- District: Kaltasinsky District
- Time zone: UTC+5:00

U-Yal (Russian: У-Ял; Bashkir: Уял, Uyal) is a rural locality (a village) in Tyuldinsky Selsoviet, Kaltasinsky District, Bashkortostan, Russia. The population was 13 as of 2010. There is 1 street.

== Geography ==
U-Yal is located 13 km north of Kaltasy (the district's administrative centre) by road. Tyuldi is the nearest rural locality.
