= Toykino, Republic of Bashkortostan =

Toykino Тойкино
- Village
- Location within Bashkortostan Location within Russia
- Coordinates: 55°58′N 55°05′E
- Country: Russia
- Region: Bashkortostan
- District: Kaltasinsky District
- Time zone: UTC+5:00

Toykino (Russian: Тойкино; Bashkir: Туйкагурт, Tuykagurt) is a rural locality (a village) in Novokilbakhtinsky Selsoviet, Kaltasinsky District, Bashkortostan, Russia. The population was 35 as of 2010. There are 2 streets.

== Geography ==
Toykino is located 30 km east of Kaltasy (the district's administrative centre) by road. Krasnokholmsky is the nearest rural locality.
