= Novy Oryebash =

Novy Oryebash Новый Орьебаш
- Village
- Location within Bashkortostan Location within Russia
- Coordinates: 56°02′N 54°44′E
- Country: Russia
- Region: Bashkortostan
- District: Kaltasinsky District
- Time zone: UTC+5:00

Novy Oryebash (Russian: Новый Орьебаш; Bashkir: Яңы Уръябаш, Yañı Uryabaş) is a rural locality (a village) in Tyuldinsky Selsoviet, Kaltasinsky District, Bashkortostan, Russia. The population was 126 as of 2010. There is 1 street.

== Geography ==
Novy Oryebash is located 21 km north of Kaltasy (the district's administrative centre) by road. Stary Oryebash is the nearest rural locality.
