= Saulyashbash =

Saulyashbash Сауляшбаш
- Village
- Location within Bashkortostan Location within Russia
- Coordinates: 55°59′N 54°52′E
- Country: Russia
- Region: Bashkortostan
- District: Kaltasinsky District
- Time zone: UTC+5:00

Saulyashbash (Russian: Сауляшбаш; Bashkir: Сәүәләшбаш, Säwäläşbaş) is a rural locality (a village) in Kaltasinsky Selsoviet, Kaltasinsky District, Bashkortostan, Russia. The population was 21 as of 2010. There is 1 street.

== Geography ==
Saulyashbash is located 7 km northeast of Kaltasy (the district's administrative centre) by road. Kalmash is the nearest rural locality.
