= Novy Atkul =

Novy Atkul Новый Аткуль
- Village
- Location within Bashkortostan Location within Russia
- Coordinates: 55°57′N 54°43′E
- Country: Russia
- Region: Bashkortostan
- District: Kaltasinsky District
- Time zone: UTC+5:00

Novy Atkul (Russian: Новый Аткуль; Bashkir: Яңы Аткүл, Yañı Atkül) is a rural locality (a village) in Nizhnekachmashevsky Selsoviet, Kaltasinsky District, Bashkortostan, Russia. The population was 68 as of 2010. There are 2 streets.

== Geography ==
Novy Atkul is located 6 km west of Kaltasy (the district's administrative centre) by road. Nizhny Kachmash is the nearest rural locality.
