= Bolshoy Keltey =

Bolshoy Keltey Большой Кельтей
- Village
- Location within Bashkortostan Location within Russia
- Coordinates: 55°58′N 54°32′E
- Country: Russia
- Region: Bashkortostan
- District: Kaltasinsky District
- Time zone: UTC+5:00

Bolshoy Keltey (Russian: Большой Кельтей; Bashkir: Оло Кәлтәй, Olo Kältäy) is a rural locality (a village) and the administrative centre of Kelteyevsky Selsoviet, Kaltasinsky District, Bashkortostan, Russia. The population was 759 as of 2010. There are 18 streets.

== Geography ==
Bolshoy Keltey is located 18 km west of Kaltasy (the district's administrative centre) by road. Kuterem is the nearest rural locality.
