= Nizhny Tykhtem =

Nizhny Tykhtem Нижний Тыхтем
- Village
- Location within Bashkortostan Location within Russia
- Coordinates: 55°57′N 54°37′E
- Country: Russia
- Region: Bashkortostan
- District: Kaltasinsky District
- Time zone: UTC+5:00

Nizhny Tykhtem (Russian: Нижний Тыхтем; Bashkir: Түбәнге Тиктәм, Tübänge Tiktäm) is a rural locality (a village) in Kelteyevsky Selsoviet, Kaltasinsky District, Bashkortostan, Russia. The population was 159 as of 2010. There are 5 streets.

== Geography ==
Nizhny Tykhtem is located 13 km west of Kaltasy (the district's administrative centre) by road. Verkhny Tykhtem is the nearest rural locality.
