= Kuchash =

Kuchash Кучаш
- Selo
- Location within Bashkortostan Location within Russia
- Coordinates: 55°59′N 55°16′E
- Country: Russia
- Region: Bashkortostan
- District: Kaltasinsky District
- Time zone: UTC+5:00

Kuchash (Russian: Кучаш; Bashkir: Күсәш, Küsäş) is a rural locality (a selo) in Novokilbakhtinsky Selsoviet, Kaltasinsky District, Bashkortostan, Russia. The population was 252 as of 2010. There are 13 streets.

== Geography ==
Kuchash is located 34 km east of Kaltasy (the district's administrative centre) by road. Aktuganovo is the nearest rural locality.
