= Staroyashevo =

Staroyashevo Старояшево
- Village
- Location within Bashkortostan Location within Russia
- Coordinates: 56°02′N 55°20′E
- Country: Russia
- Region: Bashkortostan
- District: Kaltasinsky District
- Time zone: UTC+5:00

Staroyashevo (Russian: Старояшево; Bashkir: Иҫке Йәш, İśke Yäş) is a rural locality (a village) in Staroyashevsky Selsoviet, Kaltasinsky District, Bashkortostan, Russia. The population was 221 as of 2010. There are 5 streets.

== Geography ==
Staroyashevo is located 44 km east of Kaltasy (the district's administrative centre) by road. Bratovshchina is the nearest rural locality.
