= Kalmash, Kaltasinsky District, Republic of Bashkortostan =

Kalmash Калмаш
- Village
- Location within Bashkortostan Location within Russia
- Coordinates: 55°58′N 54°54′E
- Country: Russia
- Region: Bashkortostan
- District: Kaltasinsky District
- Time zone: UTC+5:00

Kalmash (Russian: Калмаш; Bashkir: Ҡалмаш, Qalmaş) is a rural locality (a village) in Kaltasinsky Selsoviet, Kaltasinsky District, Bashkortostan, Russia. The population was 503 as of 2010. There are 12 streets.

== Geography ==
Kalmash is located 7 km east of Kaltasy (the district's administrative centre) by road. Novotokranovo is the nearest rural locality.
