= Novy Amzibash =

Novy Amzibash Новый Амзибаш
- Village
- Location within Bashkortostan Location within Russia
- Coordinates: 56°01′N 54°36′E
- Country: Russia
- Region: Bashkortostan
- District: Kaltasinsky District
- Time zone: UTC+5:00

Novy Amzibash (Russian: Новый Амзибаш; Bashkir: Яңы Әмзебаш, Yañı Ämzebaş) is a rural locality (a village) in Amzibashevsky Selsoviet, Kaltasinsky District, Bashkortostan, Russia. The population was 11 as of 2010. There is 1 street.

== Geography ==
Novy Amzibash is located 22 km northwest of Kaltasy (the district's administrative centre) by road. Verkhny Tykhtem is the nearest rural locality.
