= Kugarchino =

Kugarchino Кугарчино
- Village
- Location within Bashkortostan Location within Russia
- Coordinates: 55°52′N 55°04′E
- Country: Russia
- Region: Bashkortostan
- District: Kaltasinsky District
- Time zone: UTC+5:00

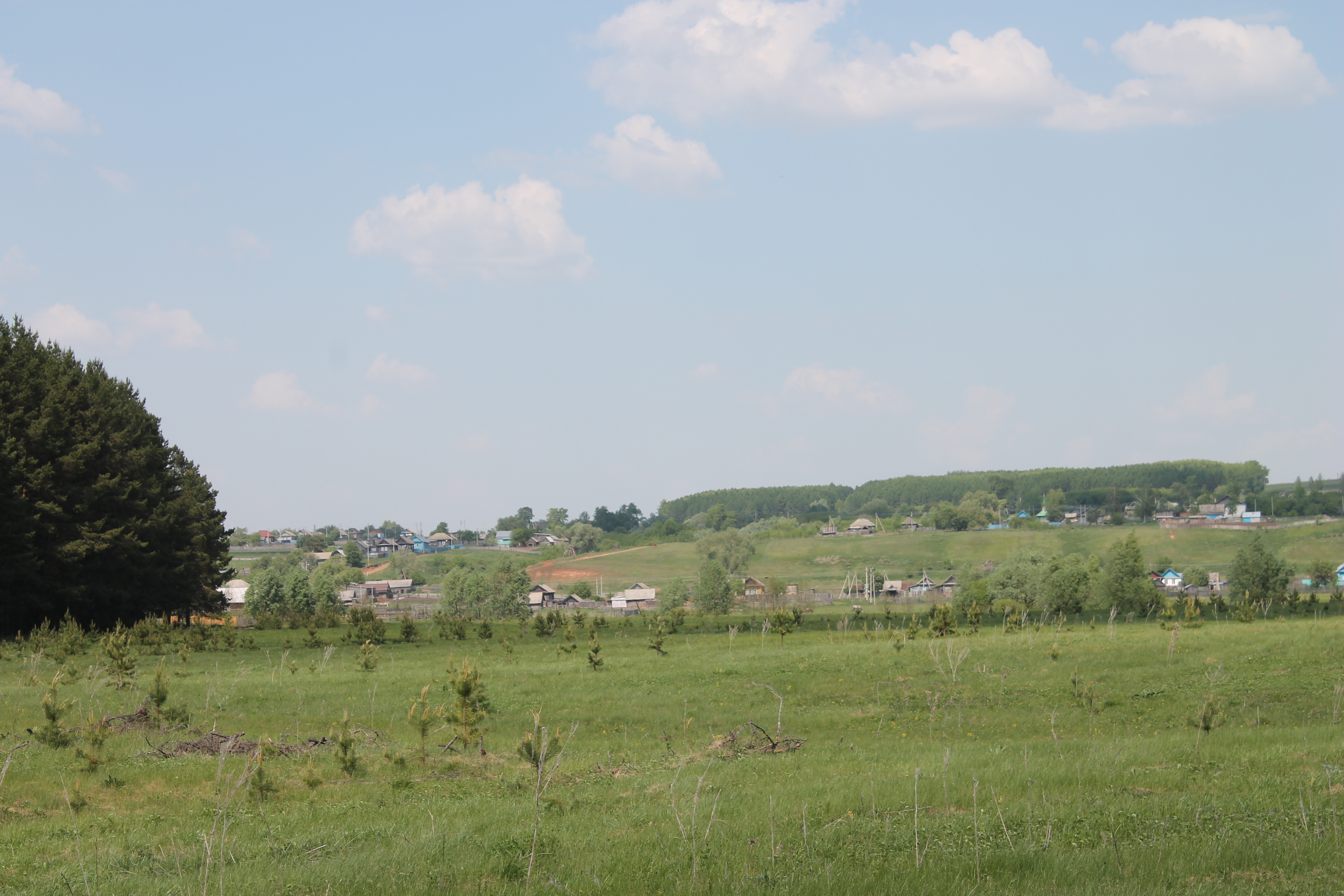
Кугарчино (Башкортостан) Калтасинский район

Kugarchino (Russian: Кугарчино; Bashkir: Күгәрсен, Kügärsen) is a rural locality (a village) in Bolshekachakovsky Selsoviet, Kaltasinsky District, Bashkortostan, Russia. The population was 178 as of 2010. There are 7 streets.

== Geography ==
Kugarchino is located 29 km (18 mi) southeast of Kaltasy (the district's administrative centre) by road. Babayevo is the nearest rural locality.
