= Stary Oryebash =

Stary Oryebash Старый Орьебаш
- Village
- Location within Bashkortostan Location within Russia
- Coordinates: 56°05′N 54°43′E
- Country: Russia
- Region: Bashkortostan
- District: Kaltasinsky District
- Time zone: UTC+5:00

Stary Oryebash (Russian: Старый Орьебаш; Bashkir: Иҫке Уръябаш, İśke Uryabaş) is a rural locality (a village) in Tyuldinsky Selsoviet, Kaltasinsky District, Bashkortostan, Russia. The population was 297 as of 2010. There are 4 streets.

== Geography ==
Stary Oryebash is located 20 km north of Kaltasy (the district's administrative centre) by road. Kyrpy is the nearest rural locality.
