= Staroturayevo, Kaltasinsky District, Republic of Bashkortostan =

Staroturayevo Старотураево
- Village
- Location within Bashkortostan Location within Russia
- Coordinates: 55°58′N 55°12′E
- Country: Russia
- Region: Bashkortostan
- District: Kaltasinsky District
- Time zone: UTC+5:00

Staroturayevo (Russian: Старотураево; Bashkir: Иҫке Турай, İśke Turay) is a rural locality (a village) in Novokilbakhtinsky Selsoviet, Kaltasinsky District, Bashkortostan, Russia. The population was 202 as of 2010. There are 3 streets.

== Geography ==
Staroturayevo is located 31 km east of Kaltasy (the district's administrative centre) by road. Kachkinturay is the nearest rural locality.
