= Malokachakovo =

Malokachakovo Малокачаково
- Village
- Location within Bashkortostan Location within Russia
- Coordinates: 55°53′N 55°09′E
- Country: Russia
- Region: Bashkortostan
- District: Kaltasinsky District
- Time zone: UTC+5:00

Malokachakovo (Russian: Малокачаково; Bashkir: Бәләкәй Ҡасаҡ, Bäläkäy Qasaq) is a rural locality (a village) in Bolshekachakovsky Selsoviet, Kaltasinsky District, Bashkortostan, Russia. The population was 279 as of 2010. There are 5 streets.

== Geography ==
Malokachakovo is located 31 km southeast of Kaltasy (the district's administrative centre) by road. Bolshekachakovo is the nearest rural locality.
