= Tat-Bikshik =

Tat-Bikshik Тат-Бикшик
- Village
- Location within Bashkortostan Location within Russia
- Coordinates: 56°00′N 55°14′E
- Country: Russia
- Region: Bashkortostan
- District: Kaltasinsky District
- Time zone: UTC+5:00

Tat-Bikshik (Russian: Тат-Бикшик; Bashkir: Тат-Бикшек, Tat-Bikşek) is a rural locality (a village) in Novokilbakhtinsky Selsoviet, Kaltasinsky District, Bashkortostan, Russia. The population was 73 as of 2010. There is 1 street.

== Geography ==
Tat-Bikshik is located 35 km east of Kaltasy (the district's administrative centre) by road. Kuchash is the nearest rural locality.
