= Semyonkino, Kaltasinsky District, Republic of Bashkortostan =

Semyonkino Семёнкино
- Village
- Location within Bashkortostan Location within Russia
- Coordinates: 55°58′N 55°18′E
- Country: Russia
- Region: Bashkortostan
- District: Kaltasinsky District
- Time zone: UTC+5:00

Semyonkino (Russian: Семёнкино) is a rural locality (a village) in Staroyashevsky Selsoviet, Kaltasinsky District, Bashkortostan, Russia. The population was 109 as of 2010. There is 1 street.

== Geography ==
Semyonkino is located 38 km east of Kaltasy (the district's administrative centre) by road. Aktuganovo is the nearest rural locality.
