= Kokush, Kaltasinsky District, Republic of Bashkortostan =

Kokush Кокуш
- Village
- Location within Bashkortostan Location within Russia
- Coordinates: 55°59′N 54°40′E
- Country: Russia
- Region: Bashkortostan
- District: Kaltasinsky District
- Time zone: UTC+5:00

Kokush (Russian: Кокуш; Bashkir: Кәкүш, Käküş) is a rural locality (a village) in Nizhnekachmashevsky Selsoviet, Kaltasinsky District, Bashkortostan, Russia. The population was 284 as of 2010. It has 7 streets.

== Geography ==
Kokush is located 9 km northwest of Kaltasy (the district's administrative centre) by road. Nizhny Kachmash is the nearest rural locality.
