= Verkhny Kachmash =

Verkhny Kachmash Верхний Качмаш
- Village
- Location within Bashkortostan Location within Russia
- Coordinates: 56°00′N 54°42′E
- Country: Russia
- Region: Bashkortostan
- District: Kaltasinsky District
- Time zone: UTC+5:00

Verkhny Kachmash (Russian: Верхний Качмаш; Bashkir: Үрге Ҡасмаш, Ürge Qasmaş) is a rural locality (a village) in Nizhnekachmashevsky Selsoviet, Kaltasinsky District, Bashkortostan, Russia. The population was 86 as of 2010. There are 4 streets.

== Geography ==
Verkhny Kachmash is located 13 km northwest of Kaltasy (the district's administrative centre) by road. Ilchibay is the nearest rural locality.
