= Akineyevo =

Akineyevo Акинеево
- Village
- Location within Bashkortostan Location within Russia
- Coordinates: 56°06′N 54°28′E
- Country: Russia
- Region: Bashkortostan
- District: Kaltasinsky District
- Time zone: UTC+5:00

Akineyevo (Russian: Акинеево; Bashkir: Әкәнәй, Äkänäy) is a rural locality (a village) in Kaleginsky Selsoviet, Kaltasinsky District, Bashkortostan, Russia. The population was 68 as of 2010. There is 1 street.

== Geography ==
Akineyevo is located 30 km northwest of Kaltasy (the district's administrative centre) by road. Chilibeyevo is the nearest rural locality.
