= Chilibeyevo =

Chilibeyevo Чилибеево
- Village
- Location within Bashkortostan Location within Russia
- Coordinates: 56°05′N 54°27′E
- Country: Russia
- Region: Bashkortostan
- District: Kaltasinsky District
- Time zone: UTC+5:00

Chilibeyevo (Russian: Чилибеево; Bashkir: Силәбей, Siläbey) is a rural locality (a village) in Kaleginsky Selsoviet, Kaltasinsky District, Bashkortostan, Russia. The population was 113 as of 2010. There is 1 street.

== Geography ==
Chilibeyevo is located 29 km northwest of Kaltasy (the district's administrative centre) by road. Norkino is the nearest rural locality.
