= Bolshekachakovo =

Bolshekachakovo Большекачаково
- Village
- Location within Bashkortostan Location within Russia
- Coordinates: 55°55′N 55°10′E
- Country: Russia
- Region: Bashkortostan
- District: Kaltasinsky District
- Time zone: UTC+5:00

Bolshekachakovo (Russian: Большекачаково; Bashkir: Оло Ҡасаҡ, Olo Qasaq) is a rural locality (a village) and the administrative centre of Bolshekachakovsky Selsoviet, Kaltasinsky District, Bashkortostan, Russia. The population was 510 as of 2010. There are 5 streets.

== Geography ==
Bolshekachakovo is located 27 km southeast of Kaltasy (the district's administrative centre) by road. Malokachakovo is the nearest rural locality.
