= Kuyanovo =

Kuyanovo Куяново
- Village
- Location within Bashkortostan Location within Russia
- Coordinates: 55°57′N 55°05′E
- Country: Russia
- Region: Bashkortostan
- District: Kaltasinsky District
- Time zone: UTC+5:00

Kuyanovo (Russian: Куяново; Bashkir: Ҡуян, Quyan) is a rural locality (a village) in Novokilbakhtinsky Selsoviet, Kaltasinsky District, Bashkortostan, Russia. The population was 57 as of 2010. There are 4 streets.

== Geography ==
Kuyanovo is located 21 km east of Kaltasy (the district's administrative centre) by road. Krasnokholmsky is the nearest rural locality.
