= Kiyebak =

Kiyebak Киебак
- Village
- Location within Bashkortostan Location within Russia
- Coordinates: 55°57′N 55°01′E
- Country: Russia
- Region: Bashkortostan
- District: Kaltasinsky District
- Time zone: UTC+5:00

Kiyebak (Russian: Киебак; Bashkir: Кейебәк, Keyebäk) is a rural locality (a village) in Krasnokholmsky Selsoviet, Kaltasinsky District, Bashkortostan, Russia. The population was 394 as of 2010. There are 6 streets.

== Geography ==
Kiyebak is located 17 km east of Kaltasy (the district's administrative centre) by road. Krasnokholmsky is the nearest rural locality.
