= Sazovo =

Sazovo Сазово
- Village
- Location within Bashkortostan Location within Russia
- Coordinates: 55°57′N 55°02′E
- Country: Russia
- Region: Bashkortostan
- District: Kaltasinsky District
- Time zone: UTC+5:00

Sazovo (Russian: Сазово; Bashkir: Һаҙ, Haź) is a rural locality (a village) in Krasnokholmsky Selsoviet, Kaltasinsky District, Bashkortostan, Russia. The population was 549 as of 2010. There are 11 streets.

== Geography ==
Sazovo is located 18 km east of Kaltasy (the district's administrative centre) by road. Kiyebak is the nearest rural locality.
