= Mariysky Bikshik =

Mariysky Bikshik Марийский Бикшик
- Village
- Location within Bashkortostan Location within Russia
- Coordinates: 55°59′N 55°12′E
- Country: Russia
- Region: Bashkortostan
- District: Kaltasinsky District
- Time zone: UTC+5:00

Mariysky Bikshik (Russian: Марийский Бикшик; Bashkir: Мари Бикшеге, Mari Bikşege) is a rural locality (a village) in Novokilbakhtinsky Selsoviet, Kaltasinsky District, Bashkortostan, Russia. The population was 73 as of 2010. There are 2 streets.

== Geography ==
Mariysky Bikshik is located 30 km east of Kaltasy (the district's administrative centre) by road. Kuchash is the nearest rural locality.
