= Yasnaya Polyana, Kaltasinsky District, Republic of Bashkortostan =

Village in Russia

Yasnaya Polyana Ясная Поляна
- Village
- Location within Bashkortostan Location within Russia
- Coordinates: 55°59′N 54°47′E
- Country: Russia
- Region: Bashkortostan
- District: Kaltasinsky District
- Time zone: UTC+5:00

Yasnaya Polyana (Russian: Ясная Поляна) is a rural locality (a village) in Kaltasinsky Selsoviet, Kaltasinsky District, Bashkortostan, Russia. The population was 54 as of 2010. There is 1street.

== Geography ==
Yasnaya Polyana is located 3 km north of Kaltasy (the district's administrative centre) by road. Kaltasy is the nearest rural locality.
