= Bolshetuganeyevo =

Bolshetuganeyevo Большетуганеево
- Village
- Location within Bashkortostan Location within Russia
- Coordinates: 56°01′N 54°49′E
- Country: Russia
- Region: Bashkortostan
- District: Kaltasinsky District
- Time zone: UTC+5:00

Bolshetuganeyevo (Russian: Большетуганеево; Bashkir: Оло Туғанай, Olo Tuğanay) is a rural locality (a village) in Tyuldinsky Selsoviet, Kaltasinsky District, Bashkortostan, Russia. The population was 314 as of 2010. There are 4 streets.

== Geography ==
Bolshetuganeyevo is located 9 km north of Kaltasy (the district's administrative centre) by road. Tyuldi is the nearest rural locality.
