= Kurgak =

Kurgak Кургак
- Village
- Location within Bashkortostan Location within Russia
- Coordinates: 55°54′N 55°11′E
- Country: Russia
- Region: Bashkortostan
- District: Kaltasinsky District
- Time zone: UTC+5:00

Kurgak (Russian: Кургак; Bashkir: Көркәк, Körkäk) is a rural locality (a village) in Bolshekachakovsky Selsoviet, Kaltasinsky District, Bashkortostan, Russia. The population was 186 as of 2010. There are 3 streets.

== Geography ==
Kurgak is located 34 km southeast of Kaltasy (the district's administrative centre) by road. Malokachakovo is the nearest rural locality.
