= Grafskoye =

Village in Bashkortostan, Russia

Grafskoye Графское
- Village
- Location within Bashkortostan Location within Russia
- Coordinates: 55°55′N 54°27′E
- Country: Russia
- Region: Bashkortostan
- District: Kaltasinsky District
- Time zone: UTC+5:00

Grafskoye (Russian: Графское) is a rural locality (a village) in Kelteyevsky Selsoviet, Kaltasinsky District, Bashkortostan, Russia. The population was 64 as of 2010. There is 1 street.

== Geography ==
Grafskoye is located 28 km southwest of Kaltasy (the district's administrative centre) by road. Nizhnyaya Tatya is the nearest rural locality.
