= Kalegino =

Kalegino Калегино
- Village
- Location within Bashkortostan Location within Russia
- Coordinates: 56°05′N 54°33′E
- Country: Russia
- Region: Bashkortostan
- District: Kaltasinsky District
- Time zone: UTC+5:00

Kalegino (Russian: Кале́гино; Bashkir: Калегин, Kalegin) is a rural locality (a village) and the administrative centre of Kaleginsky Selsoviet, Kaltasinsky District, Bashkortostan, Russia. The population was 311 as of 2010. There are 2 streets.

== Geography ==
Kalegino is located 25 km northwest of Kaltasy (the district's administrative centre) by road. Chashkino is the nearest rural locality.
