= Sultanayevo =

Sultanayevo Султанаево
- Village
- Location within Bashkortostan Location within Russia
- Coordinates: 55°54′N 54°55′E
- Country: Russia
- Region: Bashkortostan
- District: Kaltasinsky District
- Time zone: UTC+5:00

Sultanayevo (Russian: Султанаево; Bashkir: Солтанай, Soltanay) is a rural locality (a village) in Kalmiyabashevsky Selsoviet, Kaltasinsky District, Bashkortostan, Russia. The population was 61 as of 2010. There are 2 streets.

== Geography ==
Sultanayevo is located 16 km southeast of Kaltasy (the district's administrative centre) by road. Kalmiyabash is the nearest rural locality.
