= Ilchibay =

Ilchibay Ильчибай
- Village
- Location within Bashkortostan Location within Russia
- Coordinates: 56°00′N 54°39′E
- Country: Russia
- Region: Bashkortostan
- District: Kaltasinsky District
- Time zone: UTC+5:00

Ilchibay (Russian: Ильчибай; Bashkir: Илсебай, İlsebay) is a rural locality (a village) in Nizhnekachmashevsky Selsoviet, Kaltasinsky District, Bashkortostan, Russia. The population was 27 as of 2010. There are 4 streets.

== Geography ==
Ilchibay is located 12 km northwest of Kaltasy (the district's administrative centre) by road. Verkhny Kachmash is the nearest rural locality.

== History ==
The village of Ilchebay (New Ilchibay) was first mentioned in the Household Census of Peasant Farms of 1912–1913. It recorded 179 Bashkirs with patrimonial rights living on 34 farms.

The Agricultural census of 1917 recorded the village under the name of Novo-Ilchibaeva with 97 farms and 437 Bashkir residents; a Russian family of 6 people lived in 1 farm.
