= Sharipovo, Kaltasinsky District, Republic of Bashkortostan =

Sharipovo Шарипово
- Village
- Location within Bashkortostan Location within Russia
- Coordinates: 55°53′N 54°32′E
- Country: Russia
- Region: Bashkortostan
- District: Kaltasinsky District
- Time zone: UTC+5:00

Sharipovo (Russian: Шарипово; Bashkir: Шәрип, Şärip) is a rural locality (a village) in Kelteyevsky Selsoviet, Kaltasinsky District, Bashkortostan, Russia. The population was 26 as of 2010. There are two streets.

== Geography ==
Sharipovo is located 88 km southwest of Kaltasy (the district's administrative centre) by road. Grafskoye is the nearest rural locality.
