= Vanyshevo =

Vanyshevo Ванышево
- Village
- Location within Bashkortostan Location within Russia
- Coordinates: 55°55′N 54°57′E
- Country: Russia
- Region: Bashkortostan
- District: Kaltasinsky District
- Time zone: UTC+5:00

Vanyshevo (Russian: Ванышево; Bashkir: Ваныш, Wanış) is a rural locality (a village) in Krasnokholmsky Selsoviet, Kaltasinsky District, Bashkortostan, Russia. The population was 37 as of 2010. There are 3 streets.

== Geography ==
Vanyshevo is located 13 km southeast of Kaltasy (the district's administrative centre) by road. Sultanayevo is the nearest rural locality.
