= Kachkinturay =

Kachkinturay Качкинтурай
- Village
- Location within Bashkortostan Location within Russia
- Coordinates: 55°57′N 55°10′E
- Country: Russia
- Region: Bashkortostan
- District: Kaltasinsky District
- Time zone: UTC+5:00

Kachkinturay (Russian: Качкинтурай; Bashkir: Ҡасҡын-Турай, Qasqın-Turay) is a rural locality (a village) in Bolshekachakovsky Selsoviet, Kaltasinsky District, Bashkortostan, Russia. The population was 259 as of 2010. There are 4 streets.

== Geography ==
Kachkinturay is located 32 km east of Kaltasy (the district's administrative centre) by road. Staroturayevo is the nearest rural locality.
