= Norkino, Kaltasinsky District, Republic of Bashkortostan =

Norkino Норкино
- Village
- Location within Bashkortostan Location within Russia
- Coordinates: 56°05′N 54°26′E
- Country: Russia
- Region: Bashkortostan
- District: Kaltasinsky District
- Time zone: UTC+5:00

Norkino (Russian: Норкино; Bashkir: Нөркә, Nörkä) is a rural locality (a village) in Kaleginsky Selsoviet, Kaltasinsky District, Bashkortostan, Russia. The population was 115 as of 2010. There are 2 streets.

== Geography ==
Norkino is located 30 km northwest of Kaltasy (the district's administrative centre) by road. Chilibeyevo is the nearest rural locality.
