= Novokilbakhtino =

Novokilbakhtino Новокильбахтино
- Village
- Location within Bashkortostan Location within Russia
- Coordinates: 55°58′N 55°09′E
- Country: Russia
- Region: Bashkortostan
- District: Kaltasinsky District
- Time zone: UTC+5:00

Novokilbakhtino (Russian: Новокильбахтино; Bashkir: Яңы Килбаҡты, Yañı Kilbaqtı) is a rural locality (a village) in Novokilbakhtinsky Selsoviet, Kaltasinsky District, Bashkortostan, Russia. The population was 360 as of 2010. There are 11 streets.

== Geography ==
Novokilbakhtino is located 26 km east of Kaltasy (the district's administrative centre) by road. Staroturayevo is the nearest rural locality.
