= Staryye Kaltasy =

Staryye Kaltasy Старые Калтасы
- Village
- Location within Bashkortostan Location within Russia
- Coordinates: 55°58′N 54°49′E
- Country: Russia
- Region: Bashkortostan
- District: Kaltasinsky District
- Time zone: UTC+5:00

Staryye Kaltasy (Russian: Старые Калтасы; Bashkir: Иҫке Ҡалтасы, İśke Qaltası) is a rural locality (a village) in Kaltasinsky Selsoviet, Kaltasinsky District, Bashkortostan, Russia. The population was 518 as of 2010. There are 12 streets.

== Geography ==
Staryye Kaltasy is located 2 km east of Kaltasy (the district's administrative centre) by road. Kaltasy is the nearest rural locality.
