= Malokurazovo =

Malokurazovo Малокуразово
- Village
- Location within Bashkortostan Location within Russia
- Coordinates: 56°00′N 54°59′E
- Country: Russia
- Region: Bashkortostan
- District: Kaltasinsky District
- Time zone: UTC+5:00

Malokurazovo (Russian: Малокуразово; Bashkir: Бәләкәй Ҡураз, Bäläkäy Quraz) is a rural locality (a village) in Krasnokholmsky Selsoviet, Kaltasinsky District, Bashkortostan, Russia. The population was 150 as of 2010. There are 5 streets.

== Geography ==
Malokurazovo is located 21 km northeast of Kaltasy (the district's administrative centre) by road. Bolshekurazovo is the nearest rural locality.
