= Kalmiyabash =

Kalmiyabash Калмиябаш
- Village
- Location within Bashkortostan Location within Russia
- Coordinates: 55°53′N 54°56′E
- Country: Russia
- Region: Bashkortostan
- District: Kaltasinsky District
- Time zone: UTC+5:00

Kalmiyabash (Russian: Калмиябаш; Bashkir: Ҡалмыябаш, Qalmıyabaş) is a rural locality (a village) in Kalmiyabashevsky Selsoviet, Kaltasinsky District, Bashkortostan, Russia. The population was 351 as of 2010.

== Geography ==
Kalmiyabash is located 18 km southeast of Kaltasy (the district's administrative centre) and 26 km west of the town of Balyegorsk by road. Babayevo is the nearest rural locality.
