= Baryaza, Republic of Bashkortostan =

Baryaza Барьяза
- Selo
- Location within Bashkortostan Location within Russia
- Coordinates: 55°51′N 54°54′E
- Country: Russia
- Region: Bashkortostan
- District: Kaltasinsky District
- Time zone: UTC+5:00

Baryaza (Russian: Барьяза; Bashkir: Баръяҙы, Baryaźı) is a rural locality (a selo) in Kalmiyabashevsky Selsoviet, Kaltasinsky District, Bashkortostan, Russia. The population was 53 as of 2010. There is 1 street.

== Geography ==
Baryaza is located 25 km southeast of Kaltasy (the district's administrative centre) by road. Nadezhdino is the nearest rural locality.
