= Chumara =

Chumara Чумара
- Village
- Location within Bashkortostan Location within Russia
- Coordinates: 55°47′N 54°46′E
- Country: Russia
- Region: Bashkortostan
- District: Kaltasinsky District
- Time zone: UTC+5:00

Chumara (Russian: Чумара; Bashkir: Сумара, Sumara) is a rural locality (a village) in Kelteyevsky Selsoviet, Kaltasinsky District, Bashkortostan, Russia. The population was 148 as of 2010. There are 7 streets.

== Geography ==
Chumara is located 97 km south of Kaltasy (the district's administrative centre) by road. Novokhazino is the nearest rural locality.
