= Naratovo =

Naratovo Наратово
- Village
- Location within Bashkortostan Location within Russia
- Coordinates: 55°54′N 55°04′E
- Country: Russia
- Region: Bashkortostan
- District: Kaltasinsky District
- Time zone: UTC+5:00

Naratovo (Russian: Наратово; Bashkir: Нарат, Narat) is a rural locality (a village) in Bolshekachakovsky Selsoviet, Kaltasinsky District, Bashkortostan, Russia. The population was 34 as of 2010. There are 3 streets.

== Geography ==
Naratovo is located 28 km southeast of Kaltasy (the district's administrative centre) by road. Babayevo is the nearest rural locality.
