= Verkhny Tykhtem =

Verkhny Tykhtem Верхний Тыхтем
- Village
- Location within Bashkortostan Location within Russia
- Coordinates: 55°58′N 54°37′E
- Country: Russia
- Region: Bashkortostan
- District: Kaltasinsky District
- Time zone: UTC+5:00

Verkhny Tykhtem (Russian: Верхний Тыхтем; Bashkir: Үрге Тиктәм, Ürge Tiktäm) is a rural locality (a village) in Kelteyevsky Selsoviet, Kaltasinsky District, Bashkortostan, Russia. The population was 258 as of 2010. There are 4 streets.

== Geography ==
Verkhny Tykhtem is located 12 km west of Kaltasy (the district's administrative centre) by road. Nizhny Tykhtem is the nearest rural locality.
