= Bolshekurazovo =

Bolshekurazovo Большекуразово
- Village
- Location within Bashkortostan Location within Russia
- Coordinates: 56°01′N 54°57′E
- Country: Russia
- Region: Bashkortostan
- District: Kaltasinsky District
- Time zone: UTC+5:00

Bolshekurazovo (Russian: Большекуразово; Bashkir: Оло Ҡураз, Olo Quraz) is a rural locality (a village) in Krasnokholmsky Selsoviet, Kaltasinsky District, Bashkortostan, Russia. The population was 303 as of 2010. There are 5 streets.

== Geography ==
Bolshekurazovo is located 23 km northeast of Kaltasy (the district's administrative centre) by road. Malokurazovo is the nearest rural locality.
