= Novy Ashit =

Novy Ashit Новый Ашит
- Village
- Location within Bashkortostan Location within Russia
- Coordinates: 55°56′N 54°38′E
- Country: Russia
- Region: Bashkortostan
- District: Kaltasinsky District
- Time zone: UTC+5:00

Novy Ashit (Russian: Новый Ашит; Bashkir: Яңы Әшит, Yañı Äşit) is a rural locality (a village) in Kelteyevsky Selsoviet, Kaltasinsky District, Bashkortostan, Russia. The population was 58 as of 2010. There are 2 streets.

== Geography ==
Novy Ashit is located 16 km west of Kaltasy (the district's administrative centre) by road. Gareyevka is the nearest rural locality.
