= Aktuganovo =

Aktuganovo Актуганово
- Selo
- Location within Bashkortostan Location within Russia
- Coordinates: 55°59′N 55°18′E
- Country: Russia
- Region: Bashkortostan
- District: Kaltasinsky District
- Time zone: UTC+5:00

Aktuganovo (Russian: Актуганово; Bashkir: Аҡтуған, Aqtuğan) is a rural locality (a selo) in Staroyashevsky Selsoviet, Kaltasinsky District, Bashkortostan, Russia. The population was 326 as of 2010. There are 7 streets.

== Geography ==
Aktuganovo is located 37 km east of Kaltasy (the district's administrative centre) by road. Semyonkino is the nearest rural locality.
