= Sredny Kachmash =

Sredny Kachmash Средний Качмаш
- Village
- Location within Bashkortostan Location within Russia
- Coordinates: 56°02′N 54°40′E
- Country: Russia
- Region: Bashkortostan
- District: Kaltasinsky District
- Time zone: UTC+5:00

Sredny Kachmash (Russian: Средний Качмаш; Bashkir: Урта Ҡасмаш, Urta Qasmaş) is a rural locality (a village) in Nizhnekachmashevsky Selsoviet, Kaltasinsky District, Bashkortostan, Russia. The population was 27 as of 2010. There is 1 street.

== Geography ==
Sredny Kachmash is located 15 km northwest of Kaltasy (the district's administrative centre) by road. Ilchibay is the nearest rural locality.
