= Barsukovo =

Barsukovo Барсуково
- Village
- Location within Bashkortostan Location within Russia
- Coordinates: 55°55′N 54°46′E
- Country: Russia
- Region: Bashkortostan
- District: Kaltasinsky District
- Time zone: UTC+5:00

Barsukovo (Russian: Барсуково; Bashkir: Бурһыҡ, Burhıq) is a rural locality (a village) in Nizhnekachmashevsky Selsoviet, Kaltasinsky District, Bashkortostan, Russia. The population was 12 as of 2010. There is 1 street.

== Geography ==
Barsukovo is located 9 km south of Kaltasy (the district's administrative centre) by road. Alexandrovka is the nearest rural locality.
