= Gareyevka =

Gareyevka Гареевка
- Village
- Location within Bashkortostan Location within Russia
- Coordinates: 55°55′N 54°39′E
- Country: Russia
- Region: Bashkortostan
- District: Kaltasinsky District
- Time zone: UTC+5:00

Gareyevka (Russian: Гареевка; Bashkir: Гәрәй, Gäräy) is a rural locality (a village) in Kelteyevsky Selsoviet, Kaltasinsky District, Bashkortostan, Russia. The population was 15 as of 2010. There are 2 streets.

== Geography ==
Gareyevka is located 18 km southwest of Kaltasy (the district's administrative centre) by road. Novy Ashit is the nearest rural locality.
