= Vasilovo =

Vasilovo Василово
- Village
- Location within Bashkortostan Location within Russia
- Coordinates: 55°52′N 55°00′E
- Country: Russia
- Region: Bashkortostan
- District: Kaltasinsky District
- Time zone: UTC+5:00

Vasilovo (Russian: Василово; Bashkir: Вәсил, Wäsil) is a rural locality (a village) in Kalmiyabashevsky Selsoviet, Kaltasinsky District, Bashkortostan, Russia. The population was 273 as of 2010. There are 4 streets.

== Geography ==
Vasilovo is located 28 km southeast of Kaltasy (the district's administrative centre) by road. Babayevo is the nearest rural locality.
