= Buraly, Kaltasinsky District, Republic of Bashkortostan =

Buraly Буралы
- Village
- Location within Bashkortostan Location within Russia
- Coordinates: 55°57′N 54°45′E
- Country: Russia
- Region: Bashkortostan
- District: Kaltasinsky District
- Time zone: UTC+5:00

Buraly (Russian: Буралы; Bashkir: Буралы, Buralı) is a rural locality (a village) in Nizhnekachmashevsky Selsoviet, Kaltasinsky District, Bashkortostan, Russia. The population was 34 as of 2010. There is 1 street.

== Geography ==
Buraly is located 5 km west of Kaltasy (the district's administrative centre) by road. Kaltasy is the nearest rural locality.
