= Novoyashevo =

Novoyashevo Новояшево
- Village
- Location within Bashkortostan Location within Russia
- Coordinates: 56°01′N 55°21′E
- Country: Russia
- Region: Bashkortostan
- District: Kaltasinsky District
- Time zone: UTC+5:00

Novoyashevo (Russian: Новояшево; Bashkir: Яңы Йәш, Yañı Yäş) is a rural locality (a village) in Staroyashevsky Selsoviet, Kaltasinsky District, Bashkortostan, Russia. The population was 143 as of 2010. There are 5 streets.

== Geography ==
Novoyashevo is located 41 km east of Kaltasy (the district's administrative centre) by road. Staroyashevo is the nearest rural locality.
