= Amzibash =

Amzibash Амзибаш
- Village
- Location within Bashkortostan Location within Russia
- Coordinates: 56°03′N 54°36′E
- Country: Russia
- Region: Bashkortostan
- District: Kaltasinsky District
- Time zone: UTC+5:00

Amzibash (Russian: Амзибаш; Bashkir: Әмзебаш, Ämzebaş) is a rural locality (a village) and the administrative centre of Amzibashevsky Selsoviet, Kaltasinsky District, Bashkortostan, Russia. The population was 417 as of 2010. There are 8 streets.

== Geography ==
Amzibash is located 19 km northwest of Kaltasy (the district's administrative centre) by road. Chashkino is the nearest rural locality.
