= Tynbakhtino =

Tynbakhtino Тынбахтино
- Village
- Location within Bashkortostan Location within Russia
- Coordinates: 55°59′N 54°59′E
- Country: Russia
- Region: Bashkortostan
- District: Kaltasinsky District
- Time zone: UTC+5:00

Tynbakhtino (Russian: Тынбахтино; Bashkir: Тымбаҡты, Tımbaqtı) is a rural locality (a village) in Krasnokholmsky Selsoviet, Kaltasinsky District, Bashkortostan, Russia. The population was 70 as of 2010. There are 2 streets.

== Geography ==
Tynbakhtino is located 20 km east of Kaltasy (the district's administrative centre) by road. Malokurazovo is the nearest rural locality.
