= Nizhny Kachmash =

Nizhny Kachmash Нижний Качмаш
- Village
- Location within Bashkortostan Location within Russia
- Coordinates: 55°58′N 54°43′E
- Country: Russia
- Region: Bashkortostan
- District: Kaltasinsky District
- Time zone: UTC+5:00

Nizhny Kachmash (Russian: Нижний Качмаш; Bashkir: Түбәнге Ҡасмаш, Tübänge Qasmaş) is a rural locality (a village) in Nizhnekachmashevsky Selsoviet, Kaltasinsky District, Bashkortostan, Russia. The population was 471 as of 2010. There are 10 streets.

== Geography ==
Nizhny Kachmash is located 6 km west of Kaltasy (the district's administrative centre) by road. Kokush is the nearest rural locality.
