= Chashkino =

Chashkino Чашкино
- Village
- Location within Bashkortostan Location within Russia
- Coordinates: 56°04′N 54°34′E
- Country: Russia
- Region: Bashkortostan
- District: Kaltasinsky District
- Time zone: UTC+5:00

Chashkino (Russian: Чашкино) is a rural locality (a village) in Amzibashevsky Selsoviet, Kaltasinsky District, Bashkortostan, Russia. The population was 88 as of 2010. There are 3 streets.

== Geography ==
Chashkino is located 21 km northwest of Kaltasy (the district's administrative centre) by road. Amzibash is the nearest rural locality.
