= Koyanovo, Kaltasinsky District, Republic of Bashkortostan =

Koyanovo Кояново
- Village
- Location within Bashkortostan Location within Russia
- Coordinates: 56°04′N 54°31′E
- Country: Russia
- Region: Bashkortostan
- District: Kaltasinsky District
- Time zone: UTC+5:00

Koyanovo (Russian: Кояново; Bashkir: Ҡуян, Quyan) is a rural locality (a village) in Kaleginsky Selsoviet, Kaltasinsky District, Bashkortostan, Russia. The population was 184 as of 2010. There is 1 street.

== Geography ==
Koyanovo is located 25 km northwest of Kaltasy (the district's administrative centre) by road. Kushnya is the nearest rural locality.
