= Bearing Away the Bride =

1908 painting by Russian artist Nicolai Fechin

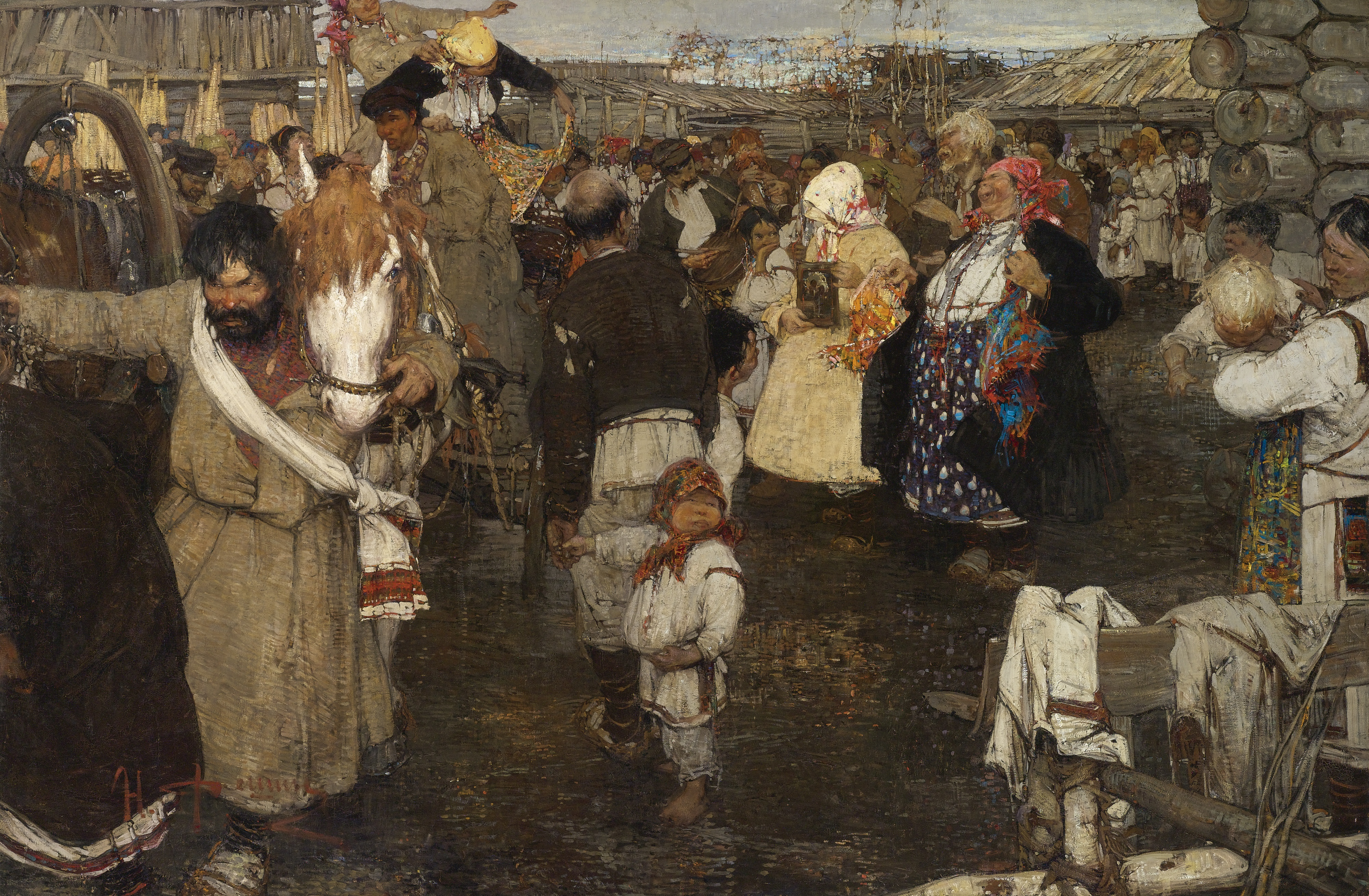
- Artist: Nicolai Fechin
- Year: 1908
- Type: Oil on canvas
- Dimensions: 111 cm × 282 cm (44 in × 111 in)
- Location: Private Collection, Russian Federation

Bearing Away the Bride (Russian: Черемисская свадьба; also known by other titles, not officially established in art history bibliography: Cheremis Wedding, Seeing the Bride Away, Abduction of the Bride, Mari Wedding, Chuvash Wedding) is a painting by Russian artist Nicolai Fechin. It was painted in Kazan in 1908. Fechin collected the material for the canvas during a trip through Mari villages.

Candidate of Art History Galina Tuluzakova called it a stage of Fechin's work, (Note: Candidate of Art History Ekaterina Kliuchevskaya also wrote that since 1908, and more specifically with two paintings Bearing Away the Bride and Portrait of an unknown (Lady in purple), created in this year, began the most fruitful stage of the master's work, which is characterized by mature professionalism, although Fechin still continued to study at the Imperial Academy of Arts.) where he "for the first time and fully" manifested the peculiarities of the artist's compositional thinking, characterized by his principles of genre painting and color. Nicolai Fechin repeated and developed the innovations he found while working on Bearing Away the Bride in his later paintings Pouring and Slaughterhouse.

It was exhibited at major national (St. Petersburg, Kazan) and international art exhibitions (Munich, Pittsburgh, New York, Chicago) many times. There is a significant scientific and popular research literature dedicated to the painting, its fate has been closely followed by the media for decades. In 2011, the painting returned to the Russian Federation from the United States, where it had been for a century, but it is part of a private collection and is currently unavailable to a wide audience of art amateurs.

== Representation ==
It is an oil on canvas painting of 111x282 cm. (Note: Dmitry Seryakov mentioned another size: 182.5x277.5 cm. Marina Yashina, head of the department for organizational and project activities of the Kozmodemyansk cultural and historical museum complex, twice in an article devoted to the painting, mistakenly called the size 73x111 cm (it is actually inches, not centimeters).) It is signed by the artist in the lower left corner: N. Fechin.

Nicolai Fechin depicted an episode of the wedding ceremony of the Mari (pre-revolutionary name — Cheremis) — the taking away of the bride from her parents' house. This event takes place in front of the whole village. In the background of the scene there are wooden buildings of village houses and fragile birches. The artist painted the scene from above, showing the viewer a wide expanse of land and leaving only a thin strip of sky above. This technique was considered characteristic of all of Fechin's genre compositions by art historian Dmitri Seryakov. Art historian Marina Yashina suggested that the event depicted by the artist takes place in autumn, as weddings were usually held after the completion of agricultural work.

In the center of the composition there is a bride dressed in white holding an icon in her hands. Her face is covered. To her right is a fat matchmaker. The embroidery on her costume is on the collar, the cleavage, and the hem. Marina Yashina explained this by the old Mari belief that the holes and edges of the clothes should be protected from the evil eye. The red color of the scarf on the matchmaker's head symbolizes life and is fundamental to Mari embroidery. Closer to the viewer, the artist placed the image of a Cheremisk woman with a child cut off by the frame. Behind her are relatives, musicians and onlookers. The bride is preparing to be placed on a cart standing to her left. The groom sits on the seat of the cart, one of the horses harnessed to it being held by a bearded man in the foreground who seems to be stepping out of the picture — toward the viewer. Seryakov believed that, judging by his facial expression and ridiculous gestures, he was depicted in a state of severe intoxication. He wears a traditional caftan (shabyr) tied over his shoulder with a festive towel. The art historian and local historian Pyotr Dulsky noted that the traditional costumes depicted in the painting do not all correspond to the historical ones. In his opinion, Fechin depicted a tradition that was changing under the influence of the artist's contemporary fashions coming to the village from the city. Gennady Ivanov-Orkov attributed such fashion influences to the bright scarves and women's aprons made of colored calico.

== History ==
=== Mari wedding rituals in ethnographers' and art historians' work ===
Galina Tuluzakova, a candidate of art history, wrote that the subject attracted the artist "by the colorfulness of the action itself. Even the Mari people, who adopted Christianity, continued to follow pagan marriage rites. Matchmakers were usually sent to find a girl, but in some cases bride kidnapping was practiced. In the late 19th and early 20th centuries, this happened when the marriage was opposed by relatives or, more often, with the permission of the parents, because the wedding was expensive for both the groom and the bride.

Once the bride price and dowry were agreed upon, the wedding date was set. The bridegroom's brother or father appointed from among his relatives. All of them were drunk with oatmeal salma, beer and wine. After that, the festive procession followed the bride with music and singing, visiting the groom's relatives along the way. A feast was arranged at each of them. Only after passing all of them did the procession reach the bride's house. Participants of the trip pretended to be drunk and fooling around, pretended to be ready to fall off the horse, swayed on it, shouted, sang to the uneven sounds of music.

At the house, the procession stopped in the street without entering the gate. The bridegroom informed the bride's father of her arrival, and then the procession entered the yard, left the horses, and approached the porch with songs and dances. Already inside the house, new rites were performed, then a feast with music and dancing began in the house. After that, the participants of the wedding procession left the house with a lot of noise. The matchmaker took the bride by the hands and handed her to the groom, saying: "Take this girl into your family. The groom took her to the yard to his relatives and put her in a cart or a sleigh. The wedding festivities moved to the groom's house. Tuluzakova attributed to the remnants of the bride kidnapping rite the custom preserved in some Volga regions, according to which the bride, after the wedding, entered the house of the groom's parents with her face covered.

Timofey Semyonov, a researcher of the everyday life of the Mari people, wrote at the end of the 19th century: "The most sullen Cheremis at a wedding becomes unrecognizably cheerful: he wiggles in all sorts of ways, claps his hands to the beat of the music, dances with passion, sings, sometimes makes furious shouts. Actually, under the influence of alcoholic beverages with sullen, suppressed by the harsh nature of Mari people, as if to remove the shackles, and he is from a quiet becomes exuberant". (Note: An extremely detailed description of the Mari wedding was given by the Chuvash ethnographer Spiridon Mikhailov (1821-1861), but for an earlier time.)

=== The artist's work ===
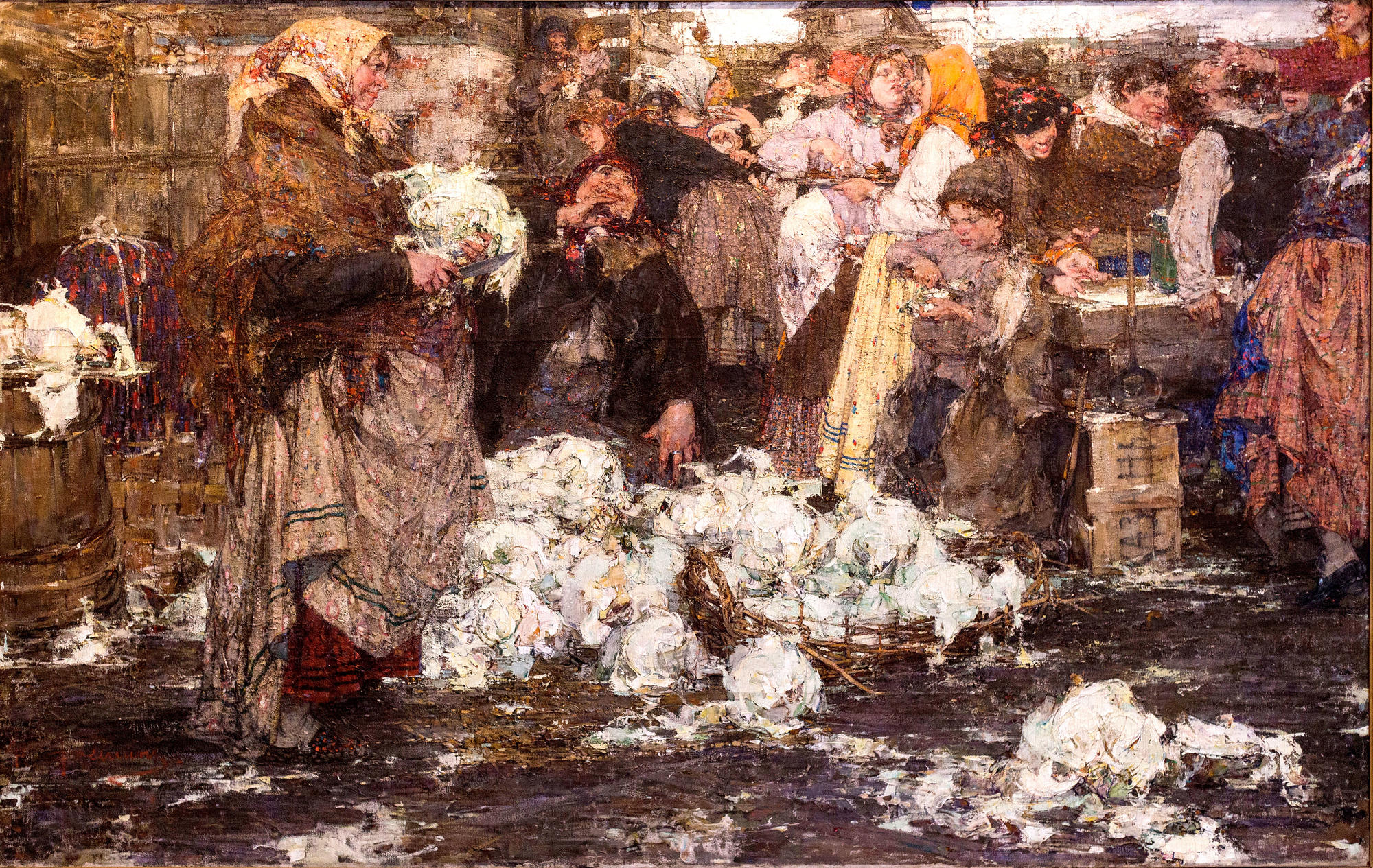
Kapustnitsa (1909) — graduation work by Nikolai Fechin, St. Petersburg, Museum of the Russian Academy of Arts

Bearing Away the Bride (1908), as well as another genre painting Fechin Kapustnitsa (1909), was created during his studies at the Imperial Academy of Arts. Galina Tuluzakova believes that in Bearing Away the Bride the artist defined the theme that fascinated him at that time — "customs, rituals, holidays of the Russian and foreign village". The choice of the theme was influenced by Nicolai Fechin's life experience. From the age of 12, he accompanied his father on trips to the villages of Kazan province to fulfill church orders for the production of wooden iconostases for altars. Fechin and his father often stayed with relatives in the village of Kushnya. "The primitive life of the people here, with their ancient pagan deities and mysterious mystical sacrifices made during rites held in the remote forests, naturally developed in me a love for everything that belongs to nature," the artist later recalled.

Nicolai Fechin said that in the summer of 1908, "...I went to the Cheremiss village of Lipsha, not to rest, but to work. After gathering the necessary material, I returned to Kazan. I settled in an empty house that belonged to my uncle and began to work on my first large composition, thee Abduction of a Young Woman, which was based on the marriage customs of the Mari people. My large painting only fit diagonally into the room. The light from the low windows was so weak that more than half of the painting was in darkness. In order to see the result of my work, I was forced to lie directly on the floor under the painting and look up". Galina Tuluzakova describes these events differently in her 1998 dissertation. The conception and collection of material for the painting, she says, "took place during the summer vacation of 1907 in the villages of Kushnya and Morki Tsaryovokokshaysky Uyezd of Kazan province. The artist wrote it already in Kazan. A compromise variant was chosen by Dmitry Seryakov in his doctoral thesis. He wrote that "the artist in the summer of 1908 goes to the Mari village Lipsha Cheboksarsky uyezd, he also works in the vicinity of the villages Kushni and Morki Tsarevokokokshaisky uyezd". The same version was presented in 1921 by the Soviet art historian and local historian Peter Dulsky.

Another version was expressed by the art historian Gennady Ivanov-Orkov. He wrote that the sketches for Bearing Away the Bride belong to the years 1906-1908 and were made in the city of Cheboksary and its Trans-Volga suburbs, where the artist visited his relatives I. S. and M. T. Teplovykh. A part of these travels took place during the First Russian Revolution, and Ivanov-Orkov assumed that, although nothing is known about the unrest and riots of the local population at that time, the very appearance and way of life could inspire fear in the artist, which was aggravated by strange rituals and sometimes bloody sacrifices. The memory of the Multan affair was also fresh in the minds of the Russian population. Despite all this, from the researcher's point of view, Fechin could not perceive the peoples of the Volga region as "alien". According to Ivanov-Orkov, he could write sketches in summer on the meadows of the Volga region (the summer period is indicated by the tan on the faces of the characters), as well as in the city of Cheboksary itself, where the inhabitants of the surrounding villages came to the market to sell their products.

According to Tuluzakova, the artist was attracted by the idea of depicting a collective action in which the crowd is a single entity and the primordial nature of people living in accordance with the natural rhythms of nature is manifested. Fechin did not even talk about a specific rite, but "tried to express in the language of painting the emotional feeling of these people, whose wildness more closely approximates the essence of human nature". In her opinion, the artist worked on an intuitive level rather than according to a logical analysis. The attempt to deal with the primary sources in the art of the early 20th century led to an interest in archaic art, as well as in folklore and primitive art. It also manifested itself in the desire to penetrate the "naive" thinking of "natural" man.

== Sketches and studies ==
The Russian Soviet "peasant poet" and artist, the last chairman of the Peredvizhniki Society and the first chairman of the Association of Artists of Revolutionary Russia, Pavel Radimov, recalled that in the early years of his acquaintance with Nicolai Fechin, the latter showed him a set of sketches of twelve of his works. Among them was Bearing Away the Bride). Radimov wrote that the artist later created his paintings on the basis of these sketches. Doctor of art history Gennady Kudryavtsev wrote about dozens of sketches of various kinds for the painting Bearing Away the Bride. He saw their special value in the fact that they "authentically convey the ethnic type, rich ethnographic characterization". Kudryavtsev drew attention to the fact that the artist practically did not turn to religious and mythological subjects in his work, but actively used folklore motifs — traditional holiday rituals and customs.

Nikolai Fусhin's sketches for Bearing Away the Bride (front and back sides of canvas), 1908

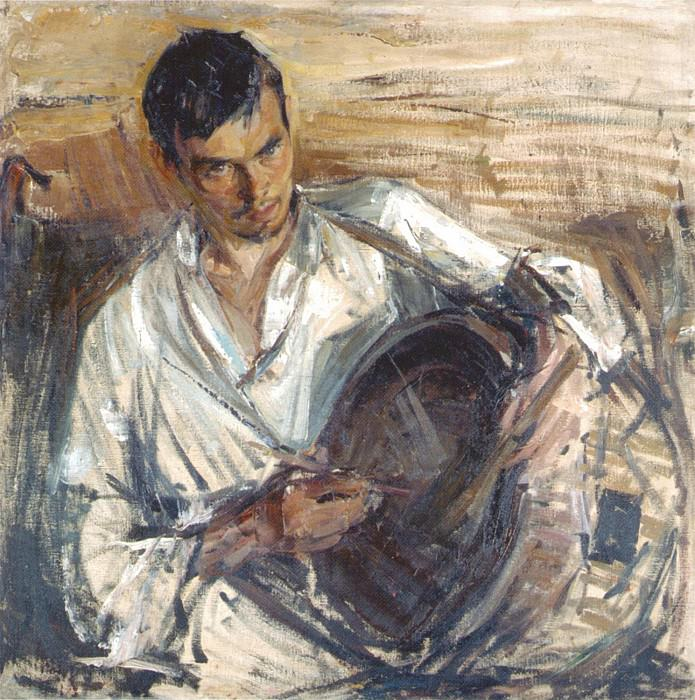
Nikolai Feshin. The Drummer

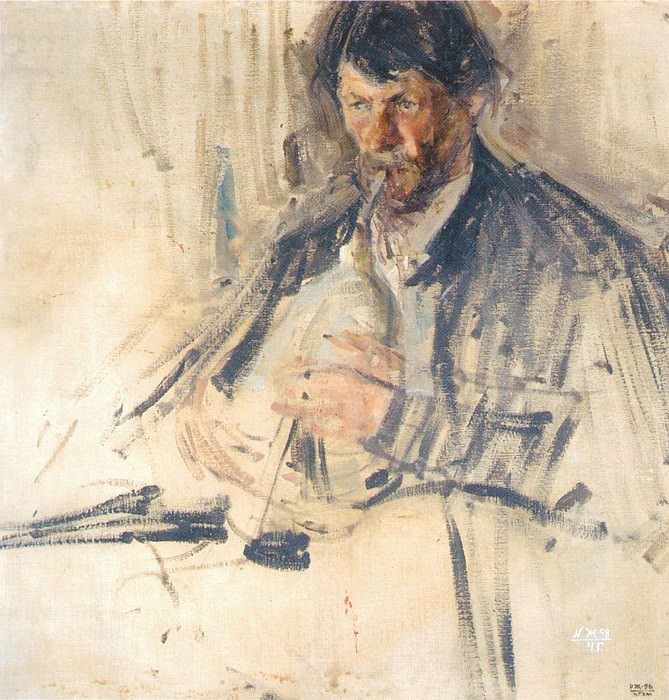
Nikolai Fechin. The Musician

Galina Tuluzakova mentions the Drummer Man (1908, canvas, oil, 92x92 cm, before restoration — 86,5x86,5 cm, inv. Zh-58, received in 1940 from P.A. Radimov), the Musician (this is an unfinished painting on the reverse side of the Drummer), and Matchmaker Woman. All these sketches are in the collection of the Chuvash Museum of Fine Arts in Cheboksary. Seryakov also called these sketches Portrait of a Chuvash Boy (1908, canvas, pencil, oil, 39.8 x 36 cm, inv. RZh-25, bottom left signature of the author N. Fechin, received in 1980 from A. V. Smoliannikov. It is also in the collection of the same museum). Tuluzakova also mentioned among the sketches related to the work on Bearing Away the Bride and the Portrait of an Unknown Woman, kept in the Kozmodemyansk Museum of Art and History named after A. B. Grigoryev), which she also dated 1907. Alexander Grigoriev, the founder of the Kozmodemyansk museum, stated: "It seems that ... (name illegible) mistakenly considers [the sketch Chuvash Woman]; it is a bride for a Mari wedding. She is sitting on a wedding carriage". Gennady Ivanov-Orkov wrote that this is a married Chuvash woman in the everyday costume of the ethnographic group, with the appropriate "female" accessories.

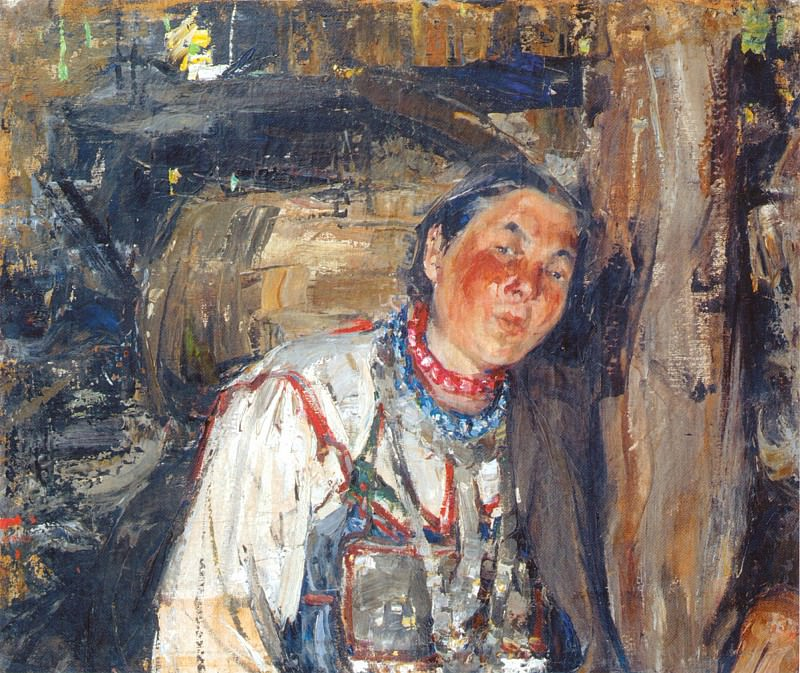
Nicolai Fechin, the Matchmaker-woman, 1908

Marina Yashina noted that in the literature of art history there are different opinions about the nationality of Nicolai Fechin's models. According to the Chuvash costume expert Gennady Ivanov-Orkov, head of the Decorative and Applied Arts Department of the Chuvash State Art Museum, the work Chuvash Woman (1908, canvas, oil, 89x31.3 cm) depicts a representative of this nationality, she is wearing the typical costume of a married woman. Ivanov-Orkov insisted that her dress could not be considered festive or ceremonial. It is typically everyday, which is particularly indicated by the absence of a hushpu headdress.

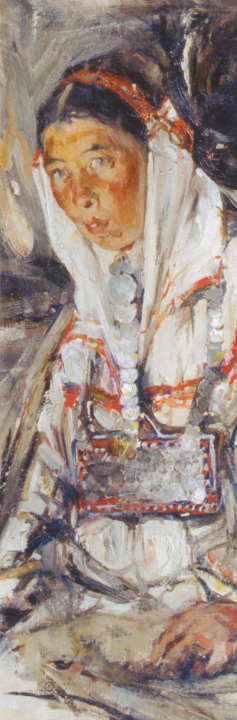
Nicolai Fechin. Chuvash woman, 1908

Dmitry Seryakov wrote about two sketches of the general composition of the painting, which are kept in the Kozmodemyansk Museum of Fine Arts (the first — 1908, canvas, oil, 79x102 cm, inv. 282, received from A. V. Grigoriev; the second — 1908, canvas, oil, 58x100 cm, inv. 284, received from A.V. Grigoriev). Like the painting itself, they depict the wedding scene from a high vantage point. Narratively, they are different. One sketch depicts a procession — the cart with the bride is escorted by the whole village. The drum and bagpipes played by two musicians in the middle of the composition had a ritual significance. During the wedding, the bagpipes played a melody to which the newlyweds ate ritual food. Marina Yashina concluded that the presence of these instruments emphasized the ritual beginning of the composition. In the painting Bearing Away the Bride, the drum was also depicted, but in the sketch the artist emphasized its importance. The bride and groom are not in the sketch, presumably already in the tarantas. But in the work itself, the painting Bearing Away the Bride, the artist placed the bride in the center of the composition.

Another sketch from the Kozmodemyansk Museum depicts the climax of the festivities. In the center of the composition are two musicians — a piper and a trumpeter. The trumpet, played by the girls to announce their marriage, is present in the sketch but absent in the finished painting. Sergei Voronkov noted that in these sketches, the person is part of the surrounding space, where figures and objects merge to preserve the pictorial unity. Fechin outlines spots of color, which Voronkov links to the tradition of Ilya Repin. Both sketches, which came to the Kozmodemyansk Museum from Kazan in 1925, are in need of restoration. The first has cracks and chips of 0.8×0.6 cm, the second has vertical craquelé. Despite their condition, they were exhibited in 1963-1965 in Moscow, Leningrad, Kirov, Kiev, Riga, Kazan, and the United States.

Seryakov wrote that the sketches from the Tatarstan State Museum of Fine Arts are made with gouache combined with watercolor. They are close to abstract compositions, drawing attention to the "swirl of strokes and lines that only remotely resemble real images". The artist sketched only the general composition of the future picture, not bothering to work out the details. The Catalogue of the works of N. I. Fechin till 1923 gives information about only one sketch (Bearing Away the Bride, sketch, 1908), paper, watercolor, whitewash (instead of it in the catalog of the exhibition of Nicolai Fechin in Kazan, held in 2006-2007, named gouache, graphite pencil and ink), 15,8x20 cm, 11,5x13,8 cm, inv. G-1899, received from N. P. Grechkin in 1978, exhibited at the exhibition in Kazan in 1991).

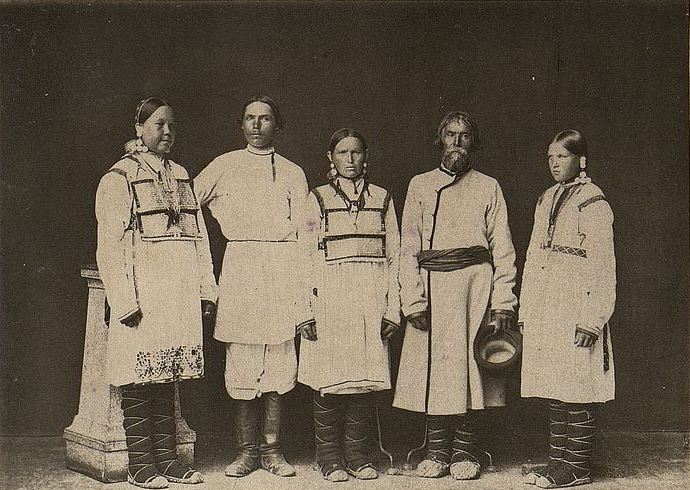
Hill Mari People, 1870

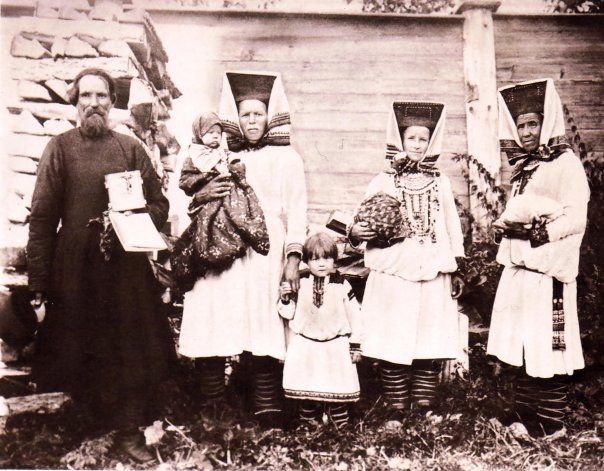
Meadow Mari, 1900

Gennady Ivanov-Orkov believed that the artist was depicting the so-called Meadow Mari people. He based this conclusion on the loose costumes — white with red stripes, exposed bellies, and low belts. He also judged the barely distinguishable pectoral jewelry to be specifically Mari. Ivanov-Orkov considered the three sketches from Kozmodemyansk and Kazan as the first stage of the artist's work on the painting. At this stage, Fechin "felt" the foundations of the future composition and color of the canvas. In the second stage he made sketches of the characters in Chuvash national costumes. In them he tried to determine the characters of the future painting. But if on the sketches he depicted the Chuvash costumes of the ethnographic group of the Middle Mari, and on the sketches — the meadow Mari, then in the final version of the canvas he depicted a third version of the costume, characteristic both for the Hill Mari people and for the Highland Chuvash. This type of costume was found in Fechin's time in two districts of Kazan province: Kozmodemyansk and Cheboksarsky, but there is no reliable evidence of the artist's visit to the former. Ivanov-Orkov noted that at that time the term Cheremis was applied to both Mari and Chuvash.

Sketches for the painting Bearing Away the Bride, 1908

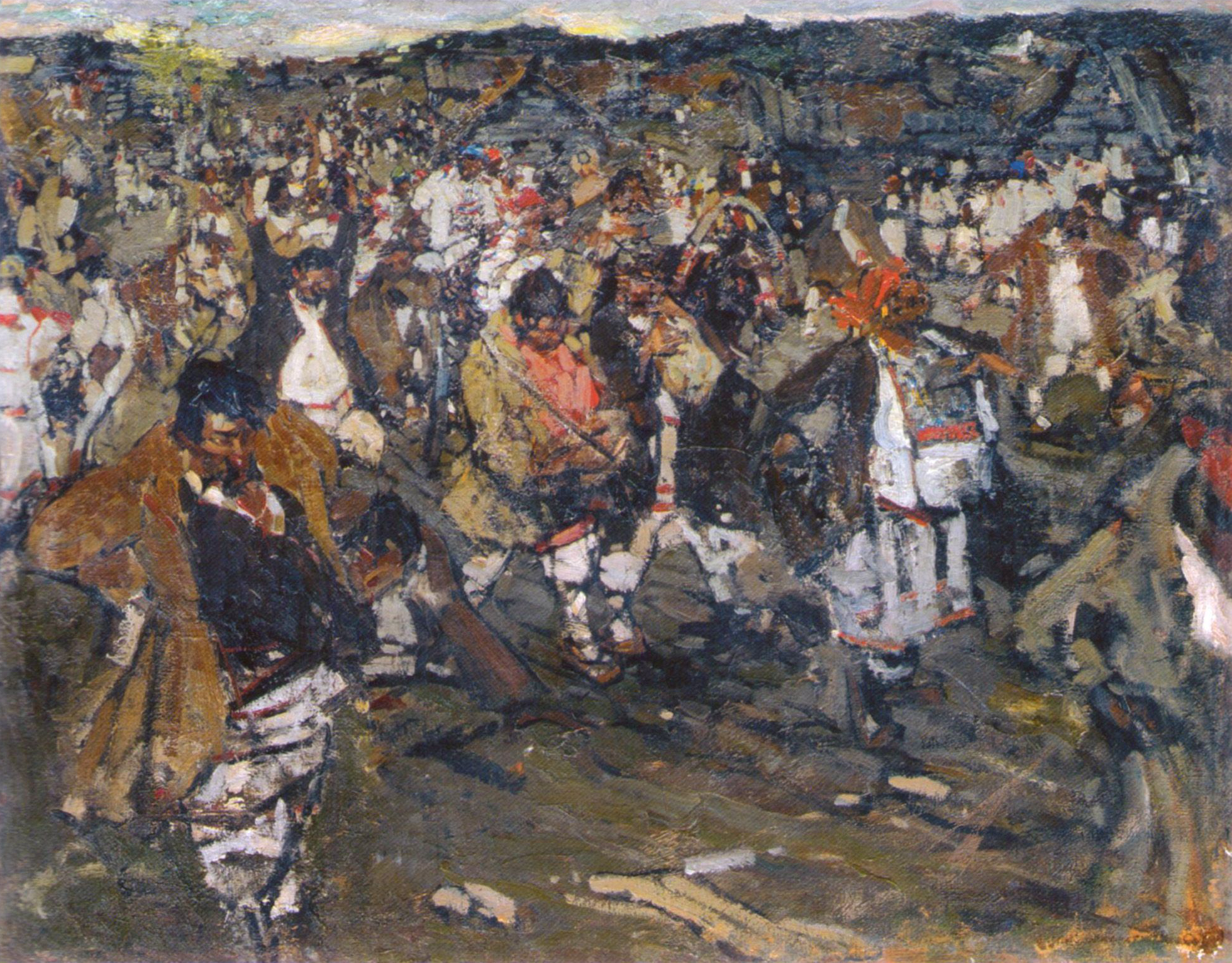
From the Kozmodemyansk Museum (with the drummer)

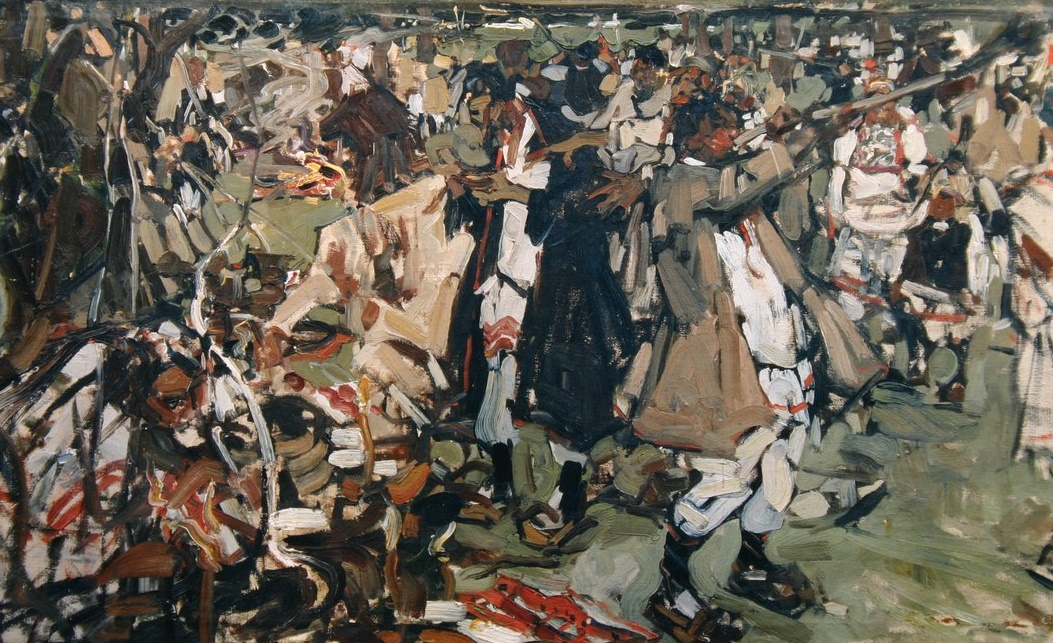
From Kozmodemyansk museum (with trumpeter)

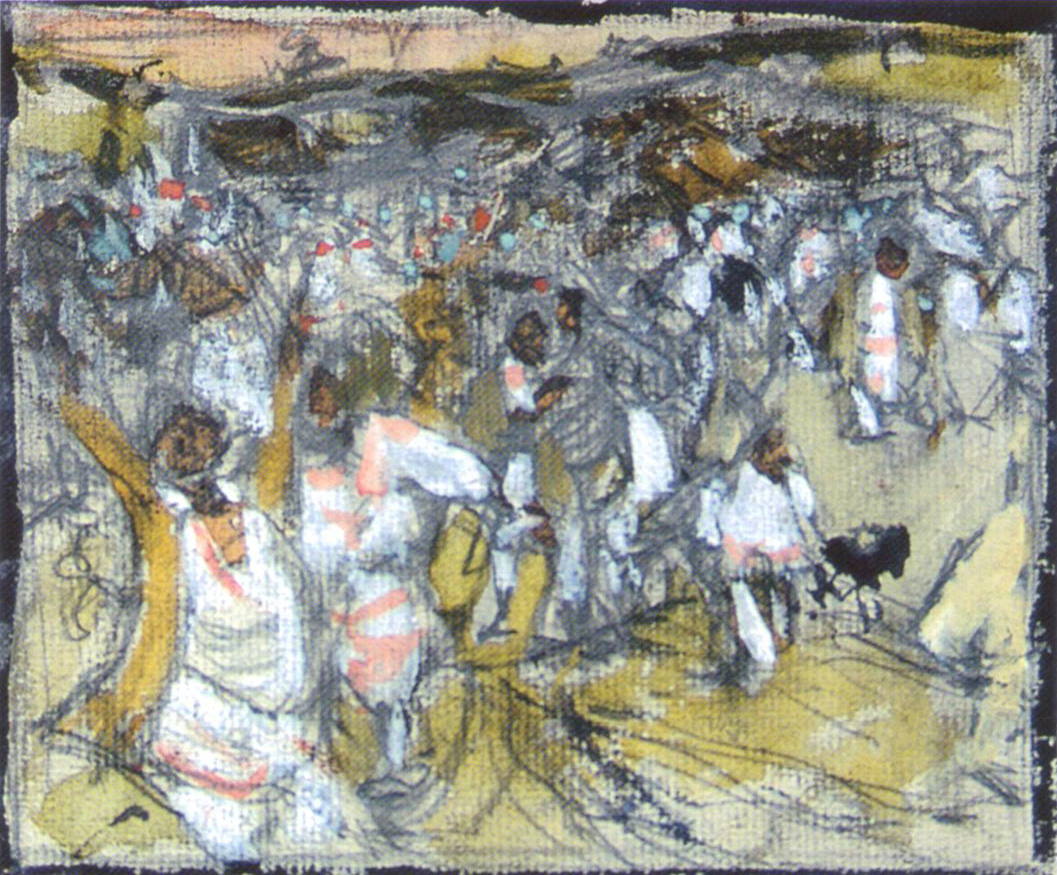
From Kazan

== Painting's destination ==
=== From Russia to the United States ===
Bearing Away the Bride was presented at the spring exhibition of the Imperial Academy of Arts in 1908 in St. Petersburg, was praised and received the first prize of the Artists' Society named after A. I. Kuindzhi in the amount of 1000 rubles. But the artist admitted that from this money he "got a little", as Fechin lent almost all the money he received to his friends-students, "whose circle was constantly expanding" as the young artist's success. Then the painting was exposed at the exhibition Modern Russian Art in Kazan in 1909.

The painting, which was then in the artist's own collection, was presented at the International Exhibition of the Society of Artists in the Glass Palace in Munich in 1910. Bearing Away the Bride was exhibited in Munich together with the painting Lady in Purple, which was awarded a small gold medal.

The painting was purchased by George Arnold Hearn, a New York businessman and art collector. He saw the painting at the Fifteenth Annual International Exhibition, held in April-June 1911 at the Carnegie Institute in Pittsburgh, The December issue of American Art News noted: "It is gratifying to know that such a remarkably strong painting has entered the collection of so distinguished and generous a patron as Mr. Hearn, and that it will remain in [our] country".

Hearn loaned Fechin's canvas to a number of exhibitions: the Sixth Annual Winter Exhibition at the National Academy of Design in December 1911-January 1912, when the Vanderbilt Gallery was the venue, and an exhibition at the Salmagundi Art Club Gallery in New York in February 1912. He died in 1913, leaving the collection to his widow, Laura Frances Hearn. A few years later, after her death (1917), the collection was sold by the American Art Association on August 27, 1918 (lot 262).

=== After 1918 ===
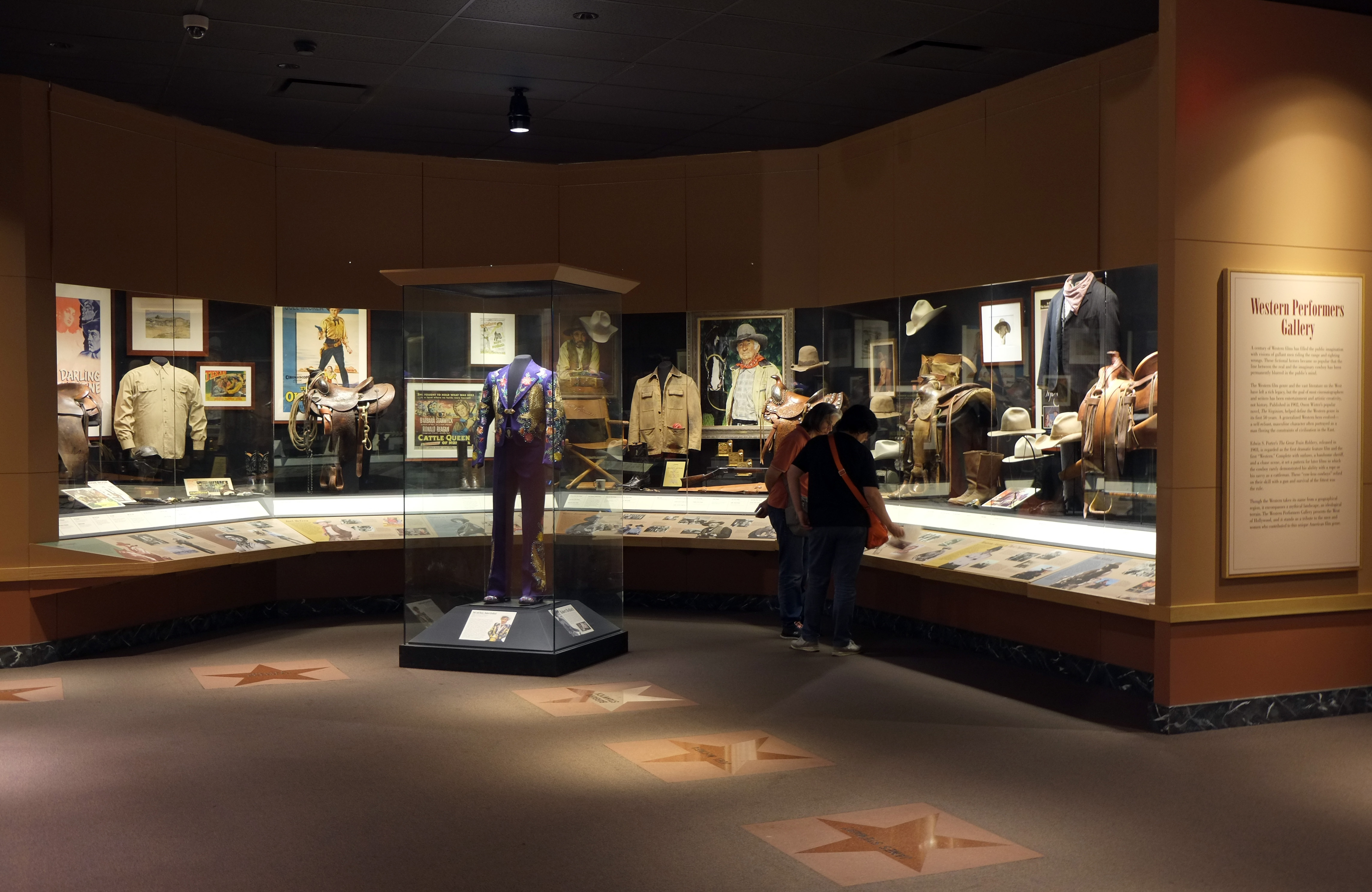
The interior of one of the rooms of the National Cowboy and Western Heritage Museum

In 1918, Bearing Away the Bride was sold for $1,500 to George B. Wheeler, Hearne's widowed son-in-law, who purchased several lots at the same sale. The painting remained in the Hearne family collection until the Great Depression, when it was sold again by the American Art Association on May 5, 1932 (lot 88). Wheeler is known to have given the painting to Clarkson Cole, another Hearne son-in-law, prior to this sale (the date of this event is not reported). Bearing Away the Bride was included in a number of major exhibitions during this period, including an exhibition of Russian art at the Brooklyn Museum in 1923 and at the Art Institute of Chicago in 1924. In 1932, the painting was purchased by August Sonnin Krebs, president of the Krebs Pigment and Chemical Company. He bequeathed the painting to Helen Krebs of Santa Fe, New Mexico. She donated the Nicolai Fechin painting to the National Cowboy Hall of Fame (now the National Cowboy and Western Heritage Museum) in Oklahoma City in 1975 through the Hammer Museum. From 1975-2011, Bearing Away the Bride was on display in the museum's permanent collection.

The National Cowboy Museum in Oklahoma City exhibited the canvas at the Masterpieces of Russian Art auction held by Sotheby's in New York on November 1, 2011. The theme of the canvas did not correspond to the direction of the museum, which is devoted to the history of the American West. It was assumed that the funds from the sale of three paintings by Nicolai Fechin (Bearing Away the Bride, Peasant Girl, and Temple Dancer), which were part of his collection and put up for auction, would be used to replenish the museum's thematic collection. Chuck Schroeder, president of the Oklahoma City museum, argued that such a significant painting needed a place where it could be presented "to a public interested in Russian art, in Fechin, and in the period in question". "There are many collectors in Russia who are interested in repatriating works by prominent historical artists," he said.

The price of the painting Bearing Away the Bride was estimated at $3-5 million. The painting became a top lot and was advertised as "the largest canvas by the artist ever sold at public auction". However, Bearing Away the Bride was sold to a private individual who wished to remain anonymous for only $3,330,500.

=== Erroneous perceptions about the history of the painting ===
Dmitry Seryakov argued in his dissertation that the painting in the Pittsburgh exhibition was not acquired by Hearn, but by William S. Stimmel, a collector of works by American artists Paul Gauguin, Maurice Vlaminck and Boris Grigoriev, who in his time created the largest collection of Fechin's works outside the artist's homeland and who made great efforts to ensure the artist's departure from the USSR to the United States. The Russian art historian based this statement on the memoirs of Maria Burlyuk, who wrote that Stimmel had about 40 paintings by Fechin in his collection, including Bearing Away the Bride, which was allegedly sold at auction after Stimmel's death. Galina Tuluzakova wrote that the possibility of Stimmel acquiring the painting was theoretically possible, but only after 1924. Sotheby's art historians, who have traced the history of the painting in detail, do not mention Stimmel among its owners.

The Chuvash national poet Pyotr Khuzangai claimed in one of his letters that Nicolai Fechin took the painting Bearing Away the Bride to the United States during his emigration in 1923, and added that the artist also took his large collection of folk embroideries, which he had collected for free during the famine of the Civil War, and which allegedly became the basis for an album of national ornaments he published in the United States.

Gennady Ivanov-Orkov, head of the department of the Chuvash State Museum of Art, wrote that for a long time in the USSR and post-Soviet Russia there were rather vague ideas about the image in the painting, based on the most widespread black-and-white illustration of poor quality in the book by Peter Dulsky, published in 1921. These perceptions were further confused by the various names given to the painting in scholarly literature and the media. Since the painting was sometimes called Bearing Away the Bride and sometimes — Chuvash Wedding, some artists and art historians even wrote about the existence of two paintings by Nicolai Fechin on the subject of weddings of two different peoples of the Volga region.

== Reviews and critics ==
=== In the Russian Empire and the Russian SFSR ===
Russian art criticism was reserved in its reception of the painting. The Moscow monthly art and literary criticism magazine Zolotoe Runo, in its review of the Academy of Arts exhibition, mentioned that Fechin's painting had been awarded the first prize, but argued that this work could not be classified as one of the best paintings of the exhibition. The media criticized the artist for his decision to exhibit this particular painting abroad, considering it unacceptable to show "images of foreigners" in everyday life in Germany, which was critical of Russia. Wrote the art critic Yevseev:

"It is simply annoying that this artist, in spite of all his virtues as a painter, seems to have deliberately distorted the drawing and reached the ridiculous in exaggeration. On the huge canvas he painted, there is not a single figure that resembles a human likeness. The respectable German families were understandably horrified to see an animal-like man standing by a cart, a woman painted with cinnabar, a boy with a pumpkin for a head, the face of an old orangutan, and a belly that almost reached the ground. I was ashamed of this caricature of Russian life. As it is, we have no special advantage abroad, and here they are shitting at an international exhibition in front of all honest people". (Note: Gennady Ivanov-Orkov explained such reviews by three factors: - Russian society itself was tense after the First Russian Revolution, and passions raged in art criticism, which had political overtones. - Critics of the painting had a poor understanding of the peculiarities of the national culture and everyday life of the peoples of the Volga region and judged from the point of view of Russian tradition. - Fechin provoked the critics with a whole group of his genre paintings (Pouring, Kapustnitsa...), so the judgment could not refer specifically to the heroes of the painting Bearing Away the Bride but in general to such characters in Fechin's work.)

On the contrary, the scientific-literary and critical-bibliographical monthly Vesy spoke positively about the painting. Peter Dulsky praised the painting for its technical skill and as a successful illustration of the everyday life of the people of the Volga region. The liberal-democratic newspaper Volzhsko-Kamskaya Speech gave a detailed positive review of the painting. It wrote: "The picture is talented and interesting. Faithful, juicy, slightly dark colors. The artist has a great ability to rich ethnographic characterization, to psychological transmission of the truth of the human face, Surikov's ability to present a living mass of people, truthful life layout". The observer noted the undeniable realism of Fechinov's picture in depicting "the sad life, eternal slavery, hard work, degeneration" of the foreign village, the richness of ethnographic details, some humor of the author.

=== Foreign reviews ===
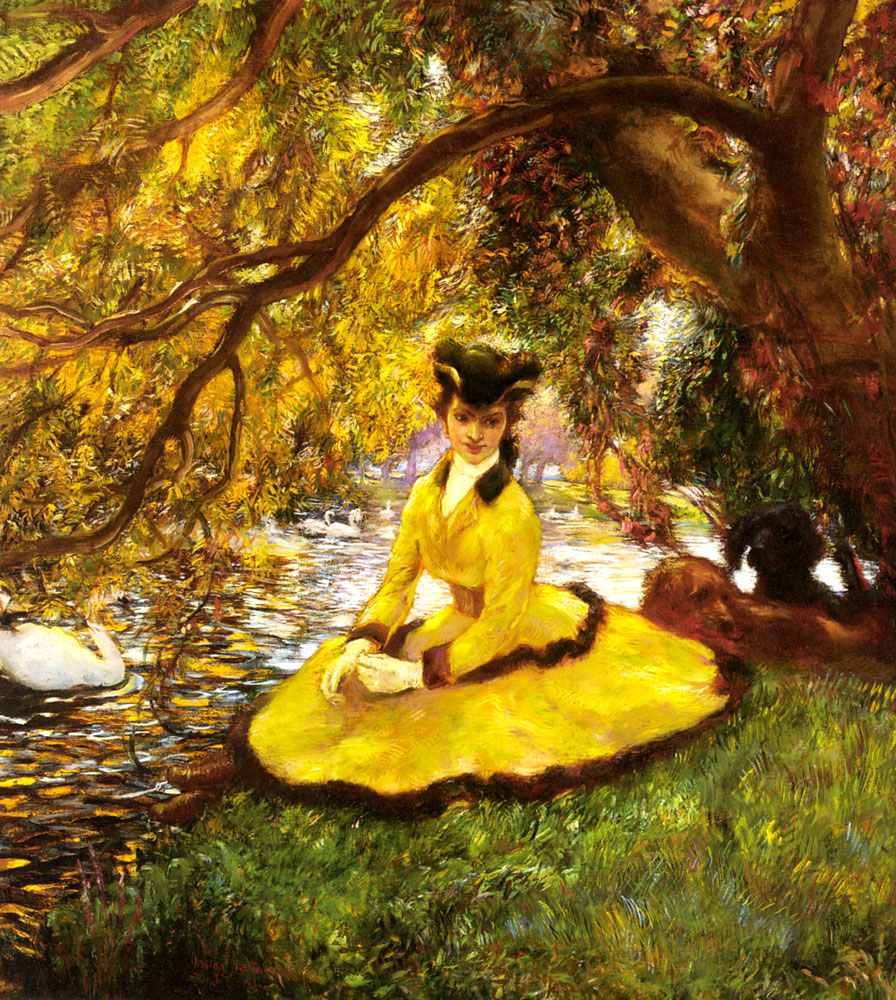
Gaston La Touche. An Amazon sitting on the bank of a pond. Canvas, oil, 111.1 x 100.3 cm

The painting was highly appreciated by art critics abroad. Dulsky wrote that Fechin managed to interest them with his unusual painting technique and ethnographic subject, unusual for Russian exhibitions abroad, and especially with his "orgiastic moods" and depiction of "the barbarism of primitive culture". The Munich art journal Die Kunst included a painting of the Bearing Away the Bride in its exhibition review. A German art critic remarked:

"A piece of truly deep Russia is represented by this gray, deserted village, this scene immersed in mud and wine fumes! Such an ugly truth! But a truth that does not pretend to be friendly, but wants to be a bitter, unvarnished truth. Bright, screaming colors of some clothes and a light spring breeze over the huts, slightly appearing on the general background, emphasize even more the miserable desert of the rest, and the peculiarly dry and rigid writing fits perfectly the character of the whole picture".

At an exhibition in Pittsburgh, the painting made a "stunning impression". An art critic for the Baltimore Sun compared Fechin's painting with the French artist Gaston La Touche's Paris Shop (in the exhibition catalog — 146A), which hung next to it in the exhibition. He wrote that both painters used the same colors, but in Bearing Away the Bride more light, it does not strike or offend the eye, "the colors are wonderfully and harmoniously arranged", Fechin's painting "in all its charming simplicity and wholeness shows all new attractive features, while the other is monotonous in impression".

=== In Soviet and American art criticism of the 1960s–1980s ===
Soviet art historians knew little about the painting Bearing Away the Bride. Even in the Catalogue of the works of N. I. Fechin until 1923 (1992), the painting was included in the "list of works whose whereabouts are unknown", without specifying its dimensions. Only three exhibitions before 1912 were mentioned, and its whereabouts were described as "in the USA".

Joseph Brodsky, in his monograph Repin as a Pedagogue (1960), criticized the painting as "caricatured" and untrue, but noted its painterly manner and technique. The 1964 exhibition catalog noted the maturity of the composition, the expressiveness of the imagery, and the brilliant technique of the painting, although the exhibition showed only sketches and drawings from the Kozmodemyansk Museum.

Sofia Kaplanova in an essay (1975) described her idea of the painting on the basis of sketches, emphasizing its mastery and vitality. Svetlana Chervonnaya in her book (1978) noted the combination of the beauty of Mari peasants with the denunciation of the coarseness of village life. In a monograph (1987), she wrote about the painting as a testament to the poverty of the region, emphasizing the drama and power of the images, including the "barbaric, brutal power" of the work.

In 1975, a monograph on the work of Nicolai Fechin was published in the United States, written by the painter, printmaker, designer, and writer Mary N. Balcom. Analyzing the painting, Balcom wrote about "...decorativeness, stylization", sinuous lines — signs of Russian Impressionism, which, in her opinion, became the main highway of development of fine art in the Russian Empire after the 1905 Revolution.

=== Contemporary art historians' reviews ===
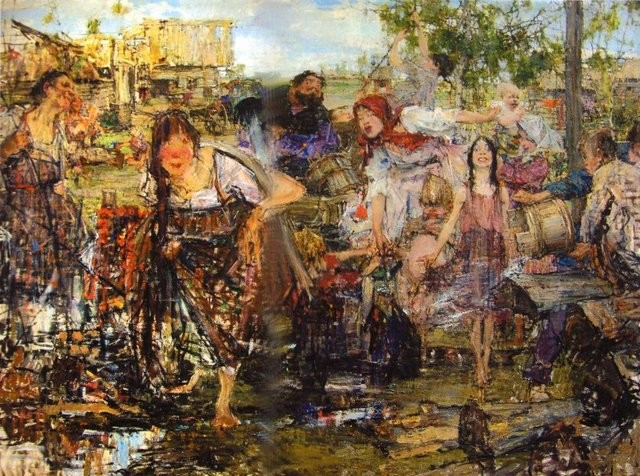
Pouring (1911-1914). Kazan, National Art Gallery Khazine

Bearing Away the Bride is briefly mentioned in the article The Return of Varenka by Anatoly Novitsky, Honored Worker of Culture of the Republic of Tatarstan, published in 1994. He believed that Fechin "cannot be considered an artist of broad social generalizations". In his opinion, Bearing Away the Bride and Pouring are not itinerant paintings, they were painted from the position of "pictorial ethnography". Novitsky noted the "animal-like faces of the men" and the "stupidity of the women's physiognomies", "ugly, blurred figures". The same thoughts were expressed verbatim by the leader of the Kazan artistic avant-garde of the 1920s, Konstantin Chebotaryov, in a conversation with Novitsky published in 2019 under the title "Reflections on Nicolai Fechin (based on a conversation between A. I. Novitsky and K. K. Chebotaryov in 1971).

The candidate of art history Aida Almazova in a monograph on the development of fine arts of Tatarstan in the context of social processes and spiritual traditions noted in the painting Bearing Away the Bride "a special scope, temperament, ability to organize and reveal characters, bright eye-catching color and primordial images". In their opinion, it was this picture that Nicolai Fechin managed to attract the attention of the public and art critics for the first time.

The chief curator of the Chuvash State Museum of Art, Georgy Isayev, believed that Fechin, by emphasizing the grotesque and "individual-physiognomic" features of the characters, did not allow the canvas to "descend into folklore". His role in this was played by the exquisite combination of red, blue and yellow colors, characteristic of the artist's individual handwriting. In the wedding ritual Nicolai Fechin, according to Isaev, attracted primarily theatrical and musical action, so he endowed his canvas with "sound". The art historian believes that Fechin's contemporary Alexander Savinov tried to solve a similar problem in his diploma picture Bathing horses on Volga (canvas, oil, 250 x 600 cm, State Russian Museum), also created in 1908. The researcher believed that in the painting Fechin managed to show not only "real existence" (its spatial and temporal characteristics), but also "essential reference points" (spiritual values, worldview), and the demand for the painting contemporaries explained by the fact that it reflects the spirit of the time between the two revolutions and the general trend of formation of the "plastic 'avant-garde' in Russian fine art.

=== Galina Tuluzakova's review ===
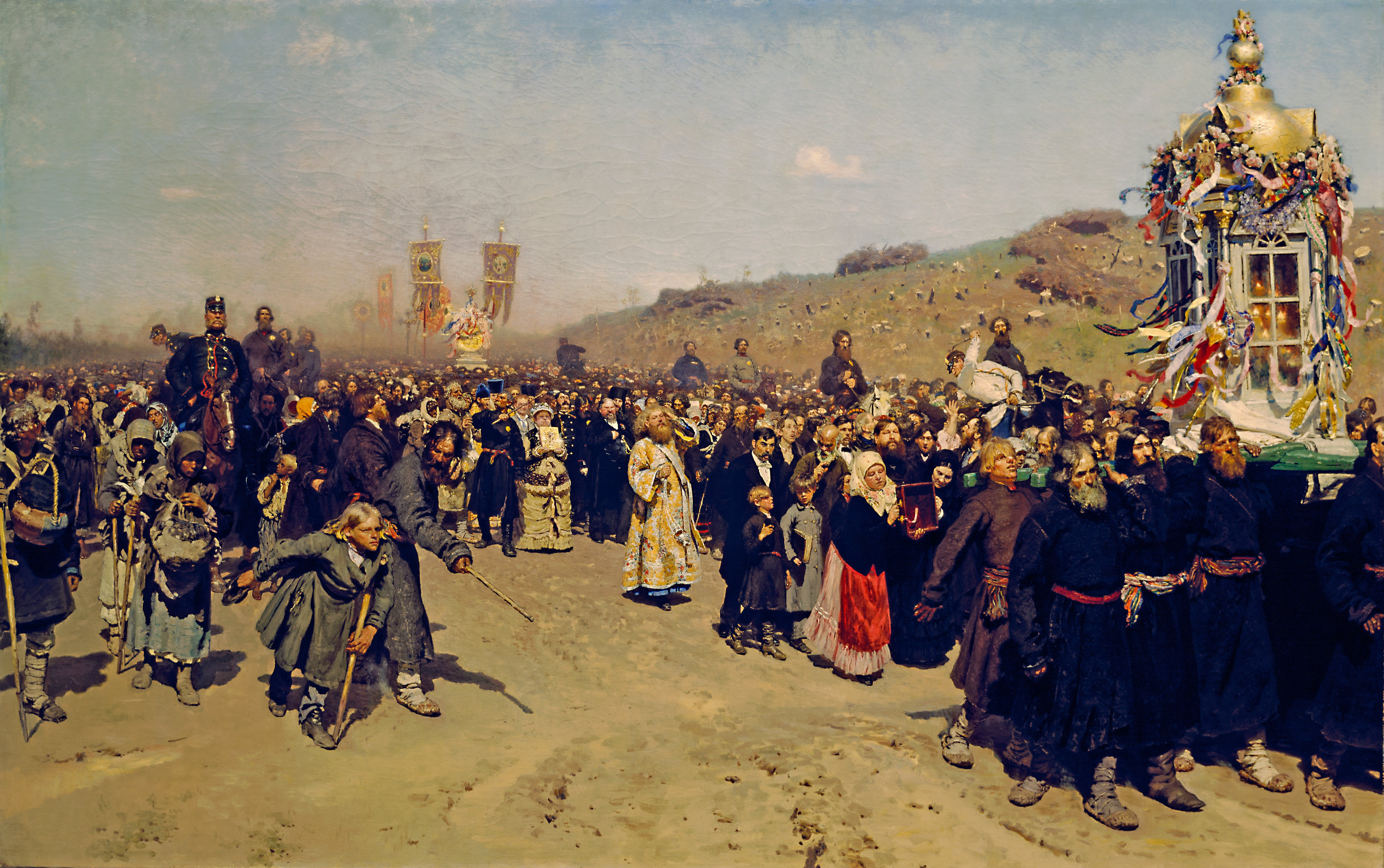
Ilya Repin, Religious Procession in Kursk Governorate, 1880-1883

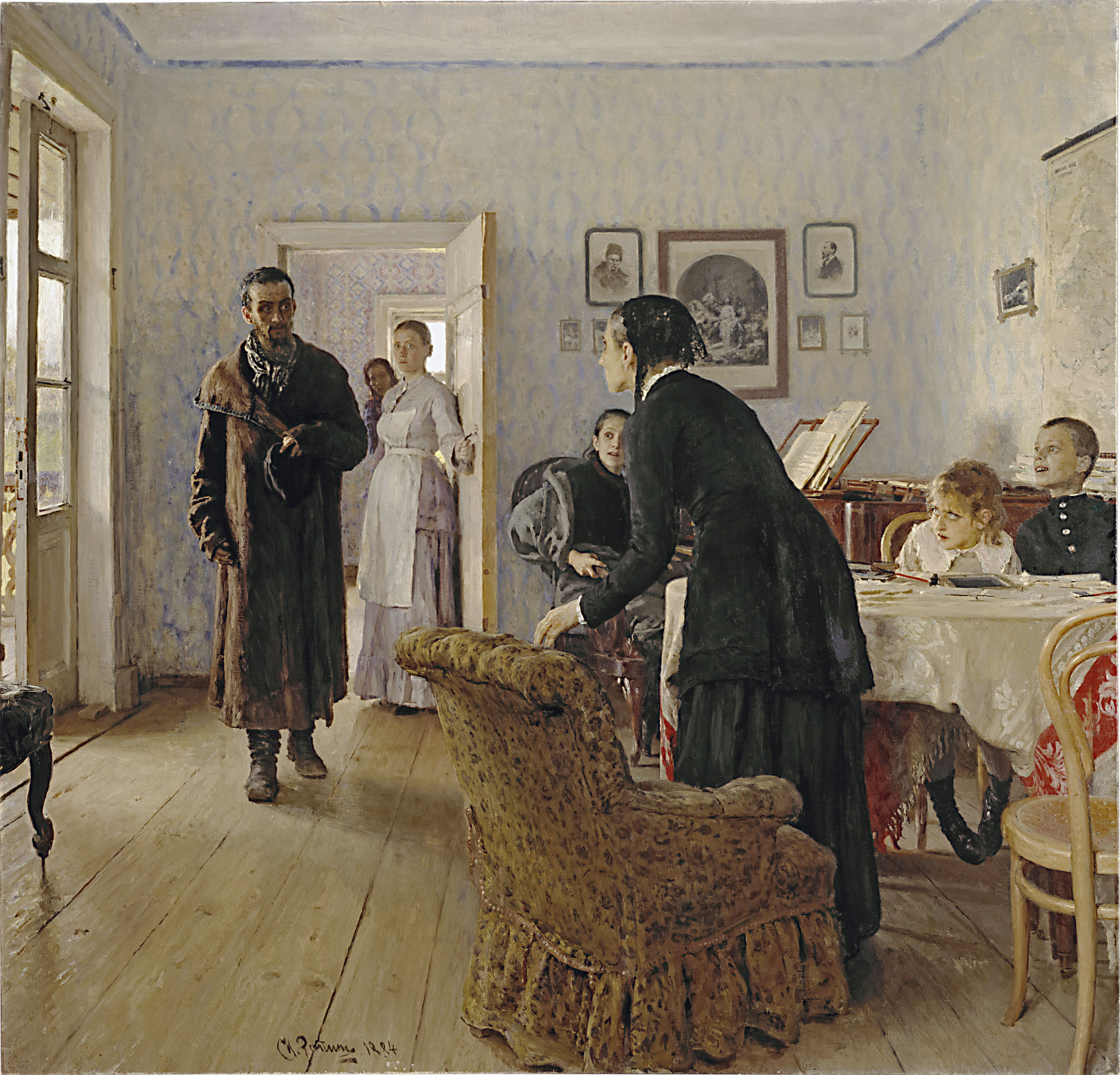
Ilya Repin, They Did Not Expect Him, 1884-1886

Galina Tuluzakova noted that in the initial sketches of Bearing Away the Bride Fechin depicted a ritual procession with a mystical character, but in the final version he chose a specific episode: the bride is led to the carriage with an icon, and the groom sits on the horses. The composition of the painting is decentralized, with the visual center shifted to the musicians. The figures of the characters form a closed composition, resembling a pattern, without the illusion of depth.

The painting combines realistic representation with a decorative construction of space. Fechin uses a muted gray palette to convey the atmosphere of an autumn day. Bright colors —yellow, blue, red— are rare and perceived as accents. The figures are individual, but united in a single action, which creates a dynamic. The artist emphasized contrasts: the landscape contrasts with the holiday, and the coarseness of the figures contrasts with the refinement of the technique. The effect of movement is reinforced by the rhythm of the strokes and the patches of color, emphasizing the tension between the static and the dynamic.

=== Dmitry Seryakov's critics ===
Dmitry Seryakov, a student of art history, considered Bearing Away the Bride to be characteristic of the so-called ethnographic theme in the artist's work, which was later reflected in such genre paintings as Pouring and Kapustnitsa. The researcher called these three paintings by the artist "ceremonial". According to Seryakov, in them the artist tried not so much to depict scenes of folk life as to show the way of life represented in certain rituals.

Dmitry Seryakov wrote that Bearing Away the Bride converges with other genre works of Fechin:

- The desire to show the pagan savagery, the kinship of man with the natural elements and his ethnic roots. No individual character is the main character in these paintings, they are all separate, independent, but only elements of the general "action".
- The plot lacks social orientation and social criticism. The art historian characterized the dramaturgy of the canvas as musical rather than literary. According to him, the painting does not tell, it only shows. The technique of painting and the artist's mastery of color are no less important than plot and composition.

=== Sergey Voronkov on painting ===
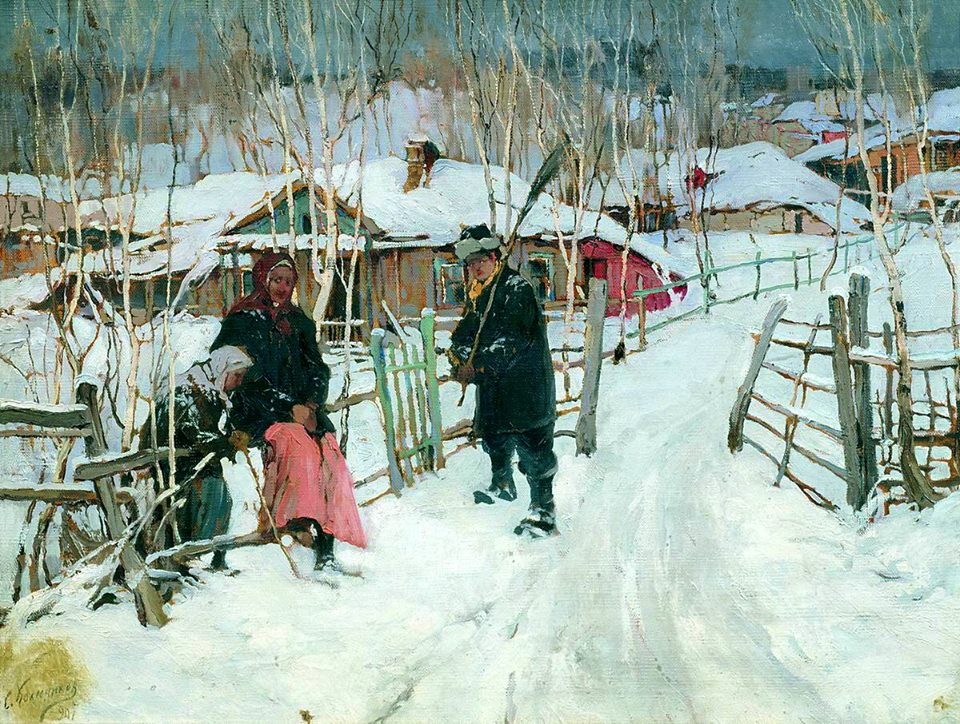
Stepan Kolesnikov. Winter. A hamlet (the artist's gaze is directed from above and the sky is depicted, as in Feshin's painting, in a narrow strip), before 1917.

The artist and art historian Sergei Voronkov noted that in the final version Fechin removed several figures from the sketches, the painting became more static, the artist brought it closer to the viewer. The painting is more decorative, drawn, dry, it has less freedom. He even referred Bearing Away the Bride to the painting panels. Art historian believed that the "temperament and way of writing" of the artist "not well enough manifested". In the interpretation of the landscape, Voronkov correlated the picture with the paintings of Fechin's contemporaries — Stepan Kolesnikov and Isaak Brodsky. Both had studied with Fechin under Repin. Voronkov believed that Brodsky's painting Boyarskaya epoch (1906, 104×206 cm, canvas, oil, Dnipro Art Museum, Dnipro), which he had painted two years earlier Bearing Away the Bride, was similar in composition to Fechinskaya's.

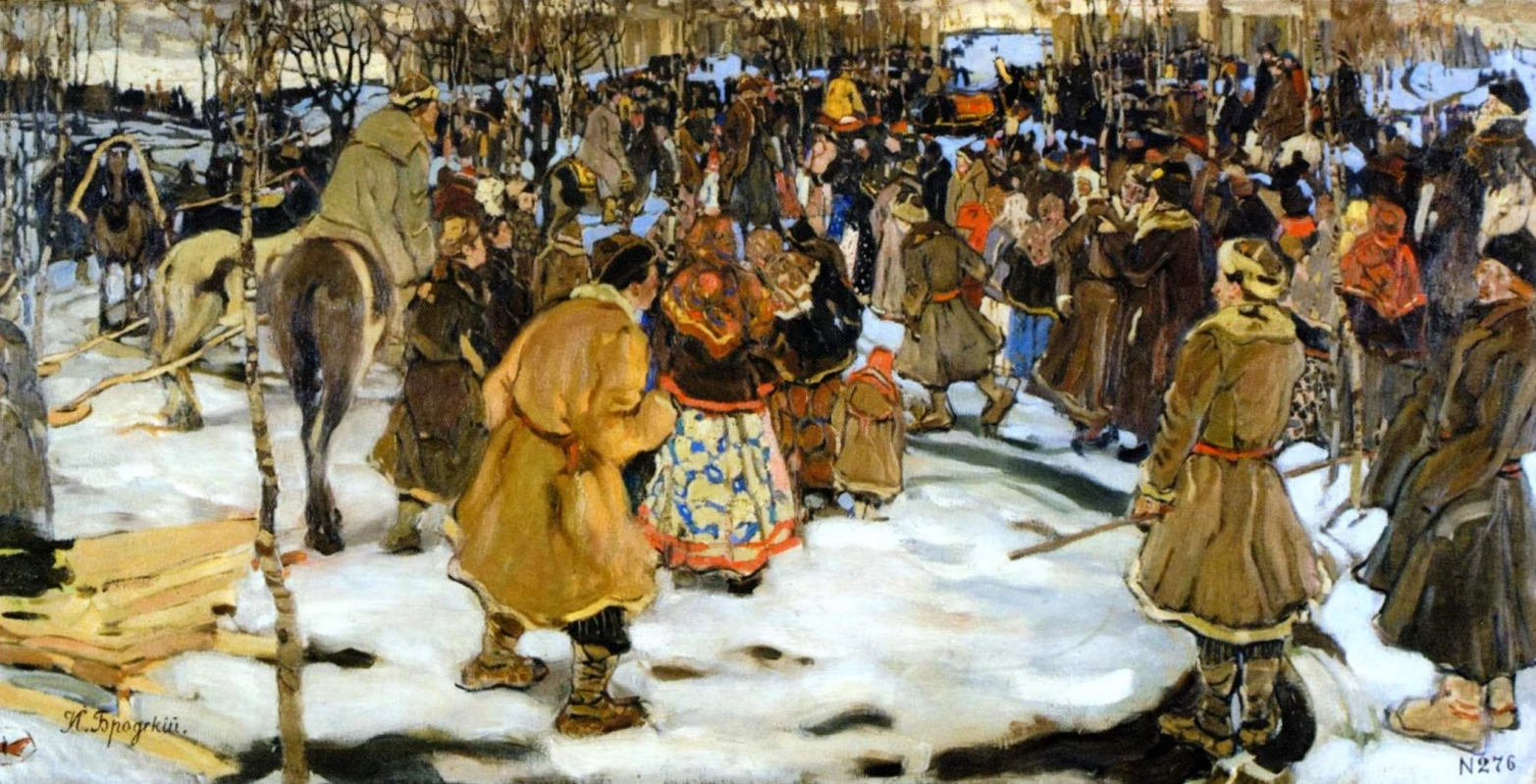
Isaac Brodsky. Boyar Epoch, 1906

Voronkov wrote about the shocking impression made on contemporaries by Fechin's paintings, especially Bearing Away the Bride, about the artist's use of the grotesque to create collective images of characters in his paintings. At the same time, there is no irony or hopelessness in his paintings. Voronkov saw in Fechin "artistic pleasure in folk customs and traditions, bordering on pagan rituals". In the researcher's opinion, Sergei Voronkov was right when he claimed that the artist not only demonstrated darkness and ignorance, but also wanted to show in Bearing Away the Bride "the poetic substance of folk ritual". Sergei Voronkov noted the thoughtfulness of the composition of the painting, formed by linear and color rhythms, and suggested that for the artist himself, the center of it could be a ricket boy in the center of the canvas in the foreground, although he admitted that it is difficult to judge this, as the original painting was not available to him.

== Bibliography ==
=== Sources ===
- Весенняя выставка Императорской академии художеств [Spring Exhibition of the Imperial Academy of Arts] (in Russian). Весы: Журнал. 1908. p. 100.
- Николай Иванович Фешин (Биографическая справка) / Каталог // Николай Фешин. Каталог выставки [Nikolai Ivanovich Feshin (Biographical information) / Catalog // Nikolai Feshin. Exhibition catalog] (in Russian). М.: Союз художников РСФСР, Министерство культуры РСФСР. 1964. pp. 3–6, 9–21.
- Каталог выставки // Николай Фешин. Каталог выставки произведений Н. И. Фешина в Государственном музее изобразительных искусств Республики Татарстан 22 ноября 2006 — 20 января 2007. Живопись. Графика. Скульптура. Декоративно-прикладное искусство [Exhibition catalog // Nikolai Feshin. Catalog of the exhibition of works by N. I. Feshin in the State Museum of Fine Arts of the Republic of Tatarstan November 22, 2006 - January 20, 2007. Painting. Graphics. Sculpture. Decorative and applied art] (in Russian). Казань: Заман. 2006. pp. 92–106. ISBN 5-89052-036-9.
- Каталог [Николай Иванович Фешин]. Сост. Ключевская Е. П. и Цой В. А. // Каталог произведений Н. И. Фешина до 1923 г. [Catalog [Nikolai Ivanovich Feshin]. Compiled by. Kliuchevskaya E. P. and Tsoi V. A. // Catalog of works by N. I. Feshin until 1923] (in Russian). Казань: Государственный музей изобразительных искусств Республики Татарстан, Татарское газетно-журнальное издательство. 1992. pp. 33–51.
- Konyonkov, S. T. (1968). Земля и люди [Earth and people]. Панорама (in Russian). М.: Молодая гвардия. p. 160.
- Konyonkov, S. T. (1964). Соколиный глаз художника [The artist's falcon's eye] (in Russian). Советская культура: Газета.
- Любитель. По поводу выставки современного русского искусства (Впечатления и мысли) [Amateur. On the exhibition of contemporary Russian art (Impressions and thoughts)] (in Russian). Волжско-Камская речь: Газета. 1909.
- Radimov, P. A. (1975). Воспоминания // Николай Иванович Фешин. Документы, письма, воспоминания о художнике: сб [Memories // Nikolai Ivanovich Feshin. Documents, letters, memories of the artist: collection] (in Russian). Л.: Художник РСФСР. pp. 120–122.
- Solovyov, A. M. (1975). Выступление на вечере памяти Н. И. Фешина 7 декабря 1963 года в Казани // Николай Иванович Фешин. Документы, письма, воспоминания о художнике: сб [Speech at the evening in memory of N. I. Feshin December 7, 1963 in Kazan // Nikolai Ivanovich Feshin. Documents, letters, memories of the artist: collection] (in Russian). Л.: Художник РСФСР. pp. 68–74.
- Художественная жизнь Петербурга [Artistic life of St. Petersburg] (in Russian). Золотое руно: Журнал. 1908. p. 123.
- Chebotaryov, К. К. (2019). Размышления о Николае Фешине (по материалам беседы А. И. Новицкого с К. К. Чеботарёвым в 1971 году) // Казанское окружение Николая Фешина. Автор идеи, редактор-составитель Сарчин Р. Ш. [Reflections on Nikolai Feshin (based on A. I. Novitsky's conversation with K. K. Chebotaryov in 1971) // Nikolai Feshin's Kazan Environment. Author of the idea, editor-compiler Sarchin R. Sh.]. Академия народной энциклопедии (in Russian). Казань: Издательство Академии наук Республики Татарстан. p. 194. ISBN 978-5-9690-0559-4.
- A Fair Exhibit. American Art News. 1911. p. 7.
- Steffens, D. H. (1911). The Carnegie Internationale Art Exhibiiion. The Baltimore Sun.

=== Researches and non-fiction ===
- Almazova, A. A. (2013). Изобразительное искусство в XX столетии // Художественная культура Татарстана в контексте социальных процессов и духовных традиций: очерки [Fine Arts in the 20th Century // Artistic Culture of Tatarstan in the Context of Social Processes and Spiritual Traditions: Essays] (in Russian). Казань: Казанский университет. pp. 209–233.
- Brodsky, I. A. (1960). Высшее художественное училище Академии художеств и педагогическое наследие Репина // Репин — педагог [The Higher Art School of the Academy of Arts and Repin's pedagogical heritage // Repin - pedagogue] (in Russian). М.: Академия художеств СССР. pp. 92–102.
- Voronkov, S. N. (1999). К вопросу о творчестве Николая Фешина. Дипломная работа, перераб. и исправл [To the question about the creativity of Nikolai Feshin. Diploma thesis, revised and corrected] (PDF) (in Russian). СПб.: Санкт-Петербургский Академический институт живописи, скульптуры и архитектуры имени И. Е. Репина. p. 125.
- Dulsky, P. M. (1921). Н. Фешин [N. Fechin]. Библиотека иллюстрированных монографий отдела изобразительных искусств Казанского народного комиссариата по просвещению (in Russian). Казань: Казанское отделение государственного издательства. p. 32.
- Ivanov-Orkov, G. N. (2007). Загадки «Чувашской свадьбы» Н. И. Фешина [Enigmas of the Bearing Away the Bride by N. I. Fechin] (in Russian). ЛИК: Литература. Искусство. Культура: Журнал. pp. 154–157.
- Ivanov-Orkov, G. N. (2016). Чувашские образы в ранних произведениях Н. И. Фешина // Чувашское искусство: вопросы теории и истории [Chuvash images in the early works of N. I. Feshin // Chuvash art: issues of theory and history] (in Russian). Чебоксары. pp. 62–72.
- Isayev, G. G. (2008). Черемисская свадьба Н. И. Фешина и тема свадьбы в произведениях чувашских художников как отражение бытия народа // Н. И. Фешин и художественная культура XX века. Материалы научно-практической конференции 22—25 ноября 2006 года ["Bearing away the bride" of N. I. Feshin and the theme of wedding in the works of Chuvash artists as a reflection of the people's life // N. I. Fechin and artistic culture of the XX century. I. Feshin and the theme of wedding in the works of Chuvash artists as a reflection of the people's existence // N. I. Fechin and artistic culture of the XX century. Materials of the scientific-practical conference November 22-25, 2006] (in Russian). Казань: Заман: Сборник. pp. 28–40.
- Isayev, G. G. (2011). «Черемисская свадьба» Н. И. Фешина и тема свадьбы в произведениях Н. К. Сверчкова // Проблемы культуры в современном образовании: глобальные, национальные, регионально-этнические: сборник научных статей: в 3 частях ["Bearing away the bride" N. I. Feshin and the theme of wedding in the works of N. K. Sverchkov // Problems of culture in modern education: global, national, regional-ethnic: collection of scientific articles: in 3 parts] (in Russian). Чебоксары: Чувашский государственный институт гуманитарных наук: Сборник. pp. 135–137.
- Kaplanova, S. G. (1975). Творческий путь Н. И. Фешина // Николай Иванович Фешин. Документы, письма, воспоминания о художнике: сб [Creative path of N. I. Feshin // Nikolai Ivanovich Feshin. Documents, letters, memoirs about the artist: collection] (in Russian). Л.: Художник РСФСР. pp. 7–20.
- Klyuchevskaya, E. P. (1992). [Николай Иванович Фешин] // Каталог произведений Н. И. Фешина до 1923 г. [[Nikolai Ivanovich Fechin] // Catalog of works by N. I. Fechin until 1923.] (in Russian). Казань: Государственный музей изобразительных искусств Республики Татарстан, Татарское газетно-журнальное издательство. pp. 7–16.
- Kudryavtsev, V. G. (2005). Фольклор финно-угорских народов Поволжья и Приуралья в графике XX века. Автореферат диссертации на соискание учёной степени доктора искусствоведения [Folklore of Finno-Ugric peoples of the Volga region and the Urals in the graphics of the XX century. Abstract of the dissertation for the degree of Doctor of Art History [Nikolai Ivanovich Feshin] // Catalog of works by N. I. Feshin until 1923.] (in Russian). М.: Российский институт культурологии. p. 40.
- Mikhailov, S. M. (1972). Труды по этнографии и истории русского, чувашского и марийского народов [Works on ethnography and history of the Russian, Chuvash and Mari peoples] (in Russian). Чебоксары: Научно-исследовательский институт при Совете министров Чувашской АССР. p. 420.
- Николай Фешин. Каталог выставки произведений Н. И. Фешина в Государственном музее изобразительных искусств Республики Татарстан 22 ноября 2006 — 20 января 2007. Живопись. Графика. Скульптура. Декоративно-прикладное искусство [Nikolai Feshin. Catalog of the exhibition of works by N. I. Feshin in the State Museum of Fine Arts of the Republic of Tatarstan November 22, 2006 - January 20, 2007. Painting. Graphics. Sculpture. Decorative and applied art.] (in Russian). Казань: Заман. 2006. pp. 93–106. ISBN 5-89052-036-9.
- Novitsky, A. I. (1994). Возвращение Вареньки [Varenka's Home-Coming] (in Russian). Казань: журнал. pp. 156–160.
- Petinova, E. F. (2006). Николай Иванович Фешин (1881—1956) // От академизма к модерну. Русская живопись конца XIX — начала XX века [Nikolai Ivanovich Fechin (1881-1956) // From Academism to Art Nouveau. Russian painting of the late XIX - early XX century] (in Russian). СПб.: Искусство-СПб. pp. 491–503. ISBN 5-210-01572-6.
- Semyonov, T. (1893). Черемисы: Этнографический очерк [Cheremis: Ethnographic sketch] (in Russian). М.: Типография А. И. Снегирёвой. p. 36.
- Seryakov, D. G. (2009). Становление индивидуальной художественной манеры Н. И. Фешина. Ученический период творчества. III. «Нон-финито» в портрете // Проблемы «нон-финито» в творчестве Николая Ивановича Фешина: диссертация на соискание учёной степени кандидата искусствоведения [Formation of individual artistic manner of N. I. Feshin. Student period of creativity. III. "Non-finito" in the portrait // Problems of 'non-finito' in the work of Nikolai Ivanovich Feshin: thesis for the degree of Candidate of Art History] (in Russian). М.: НИИ теории и истории изобразительных искусств Российской академии художеств. pp. 50–79, 80–141.
- Tuluzakova, G. P. (2007). Николай Фешин: Альбом [Nikolai Fechin: Album]. Русские художники. XX век (in Russian). СПб.: Золотой век. p. 480. ISBN 978-5-342-00105-2.
- Tuluzakova, G. P. (2008). Роль У. С. Стиммела и казанского представительства A.R.A. в организации эмиграции Н. И. Фешина (по материалам архива наследников художника) // Изобразительное искусство, архитектура и искусствоведение Русского зарубежья / Отв. редактор О. Л. Лейкинд: Сборник [The role of W. S. Stimmel and the Kazan representative office of the A.R.A. in organizing the emigration of N. I. Feshin (based on the materials of the archive of the artist's heirs) // Fine Art, Architecture and Art History of the Russian Abroad] (in Russian). pp. 159–167.
- Tuluzakova, G. P. (1998). Эволюция творчества Н. И. Фешина, 1881—1955 гг.: Основные проблемы: диссертация на соискание учёной степени кандидата искусствоведения [The Evolution of N. I. Fechin's Art, 1881-1955: Main Problems: Thesis for the degree of Candidate of Art History] (in Russian). СПб.: Санкт-Петербургский государственный академический институт живописи, скульптуры и архитектуры имени И. Е. Репина при Российской академии художеств. p. 221.
- Chervonnaya, S. M. (1978). Искусство Советской Татарии. Живопись. Скульптура. Графика [Art of Soviet Tatarstan. Painting. Sculpture. Graphics] (in Russian). М.: Изобразительное искусство. p. 292.
- Chervonnaya, S. M. (1987). Русская художественная культура в Татарии с начала XVIII до начала XX века // Искусство Татарии [Russian art culture in Tatarstan from the beginning of the XVIII to the beginning of the XX century // Art of Tatarstan] (in Russian). М.: Искусство. pp. 181–235.
- Shestakov, V. M. (1866). Быт черемис Уржумского уезда [The life of the Cheremis of Urzhum uyezd] (in Russian). Казань: Типография императорского Казанского университета.
- Yashina, M. G. (2014). Эскизы к картине Н. И. Фешина «Черемисская свадьба» из коллекции Козьмодемьянского художественного музея имени А. В. Григорьева [Sketches for the painting Bearing Away the Bride by N. I. Feshin from the collection of the A. V. Grigoryev Kozmodemyansk Art Museum] (in Russian). Казань. pp. 18–23. ISBN 978-5-93962-688-0.
- Balcomb, M. N. (1975). Nicolai Fechin. Northland Press. p. 167. ISBN 978-0873-5814-00.
- Rogers, R. (2011). The Oklahoma Cowboy & Western Heritage Museum to auction three works. The Oklahoman. ISSN 0030-171X.
