= Tyuldi =

Tyuldi Тюльди
- Village
- Location within Bashkortostan Location within Russia
- Coordinates: 56°02′N 54°51′E
- Country: Russia
- Region: Bashkortostan
- District: Kaltasinsky District
- Time zone: UTC+5:00

Tyuldi (Russian: Тюльди; Bashkir: Төлдө, Töldö) is a rural locality (a village) in Tyuldinsky Selsoviet, Kaltasinsky District, Bashkortostan, Russia. The population was 273 as of 2010. There are 4 streets.

== Geography ==
Tyuldi is located 11 km north of Kaltasy (the district's administrative centre) by road. Bolshetuganeyevo is the nearest rural locality.
