= Kushnya =

Kushnya Кушня
- Village
- Location within Bashkortostan Location within Russia
- Coordinates: 56°05′N 54°29′E
- Country: Russia
- Region: Bashkortostan
- District: Kaltasinsky District
- Time zone: UTC+5:00

Kushnya (Russian: Кушня; Bashkir: Ҡушна, Quşna) is a rural locality (a village) in Kaleginsky Selsoviet, Kaltasinsky District, Bashkortostan, Russia. The population was 115 as of 2010. There are 2 streets.

== Geography ==
Kushnya is located 27 km northwest of Kaltasy (the district's administrative centre) by road. Koyanovo is the nearest rural locality.
