= Novotokranovo =

Novotokranovo Новотокраново
- Village
- Location within Bashkortostan Location within Russia
- Coordinates: 55°57′N 54°56′E
- Country: Russia
- Region: Bashkortostan
- District: Kaltasinsky District
- Time zone: UTC+5:00

Novotokranovo (Russian: Новотокраново; Bashkir: Яңы Туҡран, Yañı Tuqran) is a rural locality (a village) in Kaltasinsky Selsoviet, Kaltasinsky District, Bashkortostan, Russia. The population was 43 as of 2010. There are 2 streets.

== Geography ==
Novotokranovo is located 3 km south of Kaltasy (the district's administrative centre) by road.
