= Krasnokholmsky =

Krasnokholmsky (masculine), Krasnokholmskaya (feminine), or Krasnokholmskoye (neuter) may refer to:

- Krasnokholmsky District, a district of Tver Oblast, Russia
- Krasnokholmsky (rural locality), a rural locality (a selo) in the Republic of Bashkortostan, Russia
- Krasnokholmskoye, a rural locality (a settlement) in Kaliningrad Oblast, Russia
