= Kyrpy =

Kyrpy Кырпы
- Selo
- Location within Bashkortostan Location within Russia
- Coordinates: 56°05′N 54°44′E
- Country: Russia
- Region: Bashkortostan
- District: Kaltasinsky District
- Time zone: UTC+5:00

Kyrpy (Russian: Кырпы; Bashkir: Ҡырпы, Qırpı) is a rural locality (a selo) in Tyuldinsky Selsoviet, Kaltasinsky District, Bashkortostan, Russia. The population was 15 as of 2010. There is 1 street.

== Geography ==
Kyrpy is located 17 km north of Kaltasy (the district's administrative centre) by road. Novokudashevo is the nearest rural locality.
