= Novokudashevo =

Novokudashevo Новокудашево
- Village
- Location within Bashkortostan Location within Russia
- Coordinates: 56°05′N 54°44′E
- Country: Russia
- Region: Bashkortostan
- District: Yanaulsky District
- Time zone: UTC+5:00

Novokudashevo (Russian: Новокудашево; Bashkir: Яңы Ҡоҙаш, Yañı Qoźaş) is a rural locality (a village) in Starokudashevsky Selsoviet, Yanaulsky District, Bashkortostan, Russia. The population was 4 as of 2010. There are 2 streets.

== Geography ==
Novokudashevo is located 37 km southwest of Yanaul (the district's administrative centre) by road. Kyrpy is the nearest rural locality.
