= Krasnokholmsky (rural locality) =

Krasnokholmsky Краснохолмский
- Selo
- Location within Bashkortostan Location within Russia
- Coordinates: 55°59′N 55°02′E
- Country: Russia
- Region: Bashkortostan
- District: Kaltasinsky District
- Time zone: UTC+5:00

Krasnokholmsky (Russian: Краснохолмский) is a rural locality (a selo) and the administrative centre of Krasnokholmsky Selsoviet, Kaltasinsky District, Bashkortostan, Russia. The population was 8,021 as of 2010. There are 54 streets.

== Geography ==
Krasnokholmsky is located 17 km west of Kaltasy (the district's administrative centre) by road. Kiyebak is the nearest rural locality.
