= Koyanovo, Birsky District, Republic of Bashkortostan =

Koyanovo Кояново
- Selo
- Location within Bashkortostan Location within Russia
- Coordinates: 55°16′N 55°20′E
- Country: Russia
- Region: Bashkortostan
- District: Birsky District
- Time zone: UTC+5:00

Koyanovo (Russian: Кояново; Bashkir: Ҡуян, Quyan) is a rural locality (a selo) in Starobazanovsky Selsoviet, Birsky District, Bashkortostan, Russia. The population was 130 as of 2010. There are 5 streets.

== Geography ==
Koyanovo is located 29 km southwest of Birsk (the district's administrative centre) by road. Usakovo is the nearest rural locality.
