= Koyanovo, Perm Krai =

Koyanovo Кояново
- Selo
- Location within Perm Krai Location within Russia
- Coordinates: 57°47′N 56°19′E
- Country: Russia
- Region: Perm Krai
- District: Permsky District
- Time zone: UTC+5:00

Koyanovo (Russian: Кояново) is a rural locality (a selo) in Lobanovskoye Rural Settlement, Permsky District, Perm Krai, Russia. The population was 1,320 as of 2010. There are 19 streets.

== Geography ==
Koyanovo is located 28 km south of Perm (the district's administrative centre) by road. Mulyanka is the nearest rural locality.
