= Kaltasy, Kaltasinsky District, Republic of Bashkortostan =

Kaltasy Калтасы
- Selo

Other transcription(s)
  - Bashkir: Ҡалтасы
- Interactive map of Kaltasy
- Location of Kaltasy Kaltasy (Bashkortostan)
- Coordinates: 55°58′10″N 54°47′57″E
- Country: Russia
- Federal subject: Bashkortostan
- Administrative district: Kaltasinsky District
- SelsovietSelsoviet: Kaltasinsky

Population (2010 Census)
  - Total: 4,418
  - Estimate (2010): 4,418 (0%)

Administrative status
  - Capital of: Kaltasinsky District, Kaltasinsky Selsoviet

Municipal status
  - Municipal district: Kaltasinsky Municipal District
  - Rural settlement: Kaltasinsky Selsoviet Rural Settlement
  - Capital of: Kaltasinsky Municipal District, Kaltasinsky Selsoviet Rural Settlement
- Time zone: UTC+5 (MSK+2)
- Postal code: 452860
- OKTMO ID: 80633425101

Kaltasy (Russian: Калтасы, Bashkir: Ҡалтасы, Qaltası) is a rural locality (a selo) and the administrative center of Kaltasinsky District in the Republic of Bashkortostan, Russia. Population: 4,418 (2010 census); 4,445 (2002 census); 4,121 (1989 Soviet census).
