= Kaltasinsky District =

Kaltasinsky District Калтасинский район (Russian)
- District

Other transcription(s)
  - Bashkir: Ҡалтасы районы
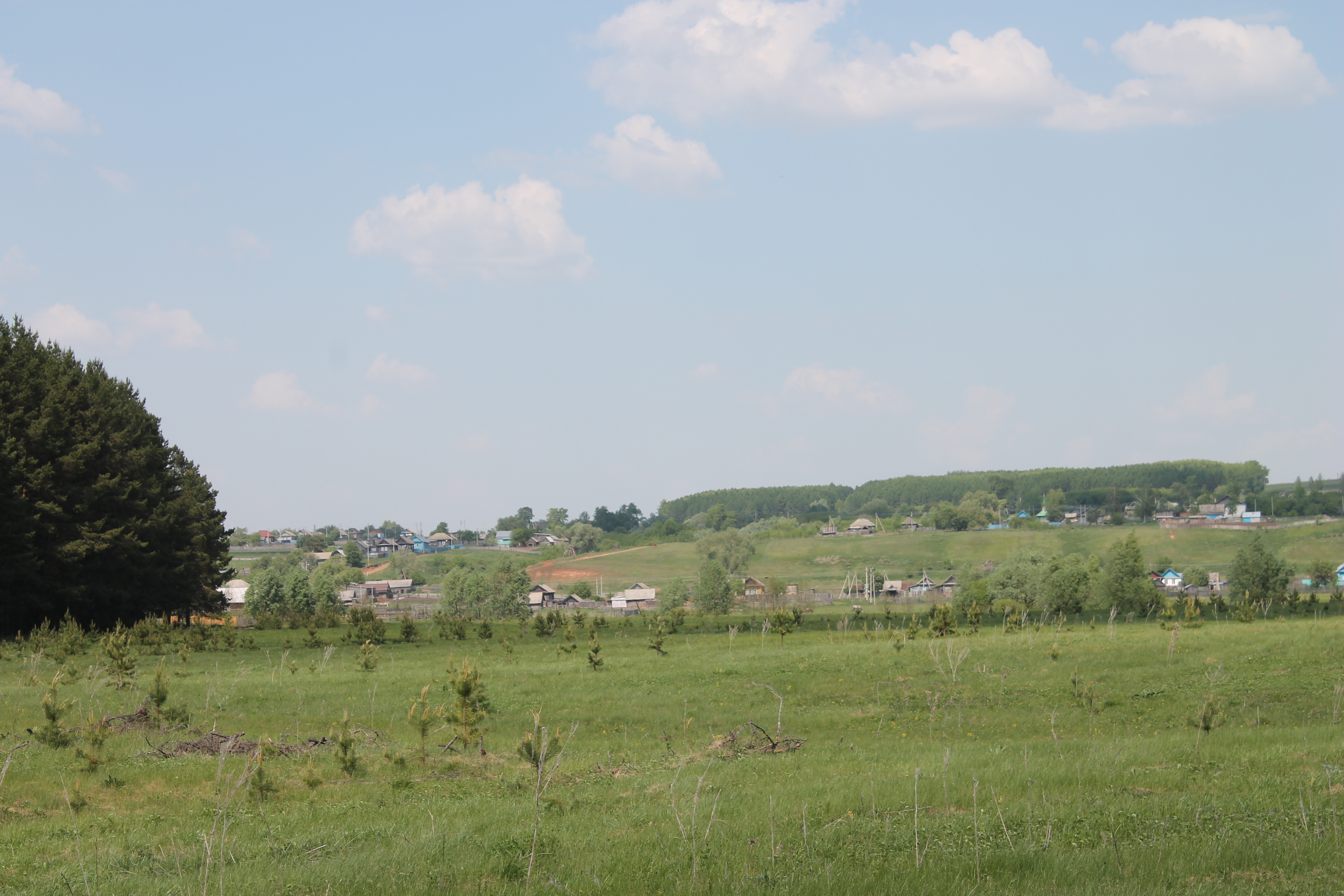
- Landscape in Kaltasinsky District

- Flag Coat of arms
- Location of Kaltasinsky District in the Republic of Bashkortostan
- Coordinates: 55°58′N 54°48′E
- Country: Russia
- Federal subject: Republic of Bashkortostan
- Established: August 20, 1930
- Administrative center: Kaltasy

Area
  - Total: 1,548.35 km^{2} (597.82 sq mi)

Population (2010 Census)
  - Total: 26,268
  - Estimate (2018): 23,063 (−12.2%)
  - Density: 16.965/km^{2} (43.940/sq mi)
  - Urban: 0%
  - Rural: 100%

Administrative structure
  - Administrative divisions: 11 Selsoviets
  - Inhabited localities: 79 rural localities

Municipal structure
  - Municipally incorporated as: Kaltasinsky Municipal District
  - Municipal divisions: 0 urban settlements, 11 rural settlements
- Time zone: UTC+5 (MSK+2)
- OKTMO ID: 80633000
- Website: http://kaltasyrb.ru

Population of Kaltasinsky District
- 2010 Census: 26,268
- 2002 Census: 28,881
- 1989 Census: 27,885
- 1979 Census: 32,711

Kaltasinsky District (Russian: Калтаси́нский райо́н; Bashkir: Ҡалтасы районы, Qaltası rayonı; Meadow Mari: Калтаса кундем, Kaltasa kundem) is an administrative and municipal district (raion), one of the fifty-four in the Republic of Bashkortostan, Russia. It is located in the northwest of the republic and borders Yanaulsky District to the north, Burayevsky District to the east and southeast, Dyurtyulinsky District to the south and Krasnokamsky District to the west. The area of the district is 1,548.35 square kilometers (597.82 sq mi). Its administrative center is the rural locality (a selo) of Kaltasy. As of the 2010 Census, the total population of the district was 26,268, with the population of Kaltasy accounting for 16.8% of that number.

== History ==
The district was established on August 20, 1930.

== Administrative and municipal status ==
Within the framework of administrative divisions, Kaltasinsky District is one of the fifty-four in the Republic of Bashkortostan. The district is divided into eleven selsoviets, comprising seventy-nine rural localities. As a municipal division, the district is incorporated as Kaltasinsky Municipal District. Its eleven selsoviets are incorporated as eleven rural settlements within the municipal district. The selo of Kaltasy serves as the administrative center of both the administrative and municipal district.
