= Kapustnitsa =

1909 painting by Russian artist Nicolai Fechin

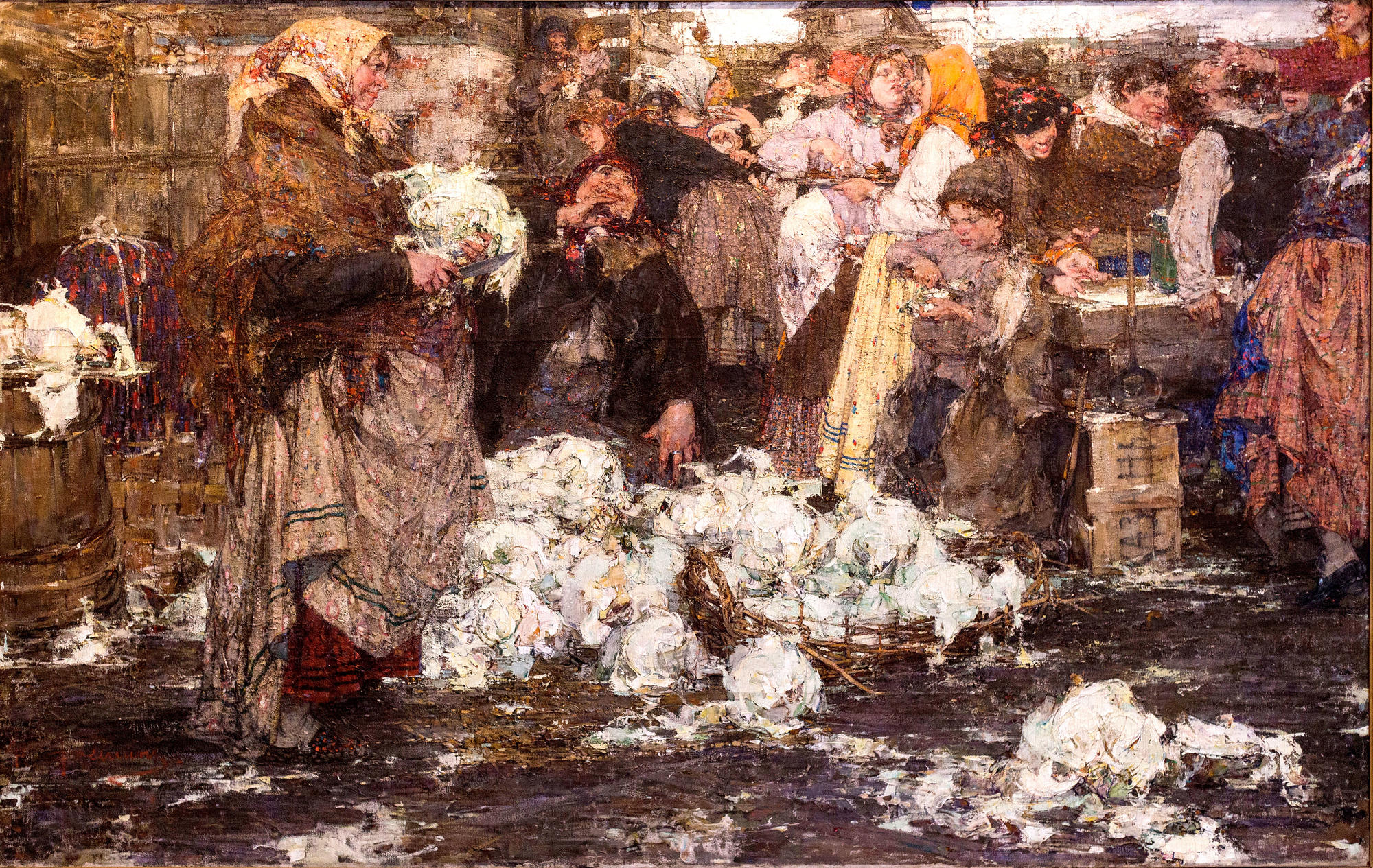
- Artist: Nicolai Fechin
- Year: 1909
- Medium: Oil on canvas
- Dimensions: 219 cm × 344 cm (86 in × 135 in)
- Location: Museum of the Russian Academy of Arts, St. Petersburg

Kapustnitsa (Russian: Капустница) is a painting by Russian, Soviet and American artist Nicolai Fechin (219 x 344 cm). The canvas depicts a scene from everyday life in a Russian village and small provincial towns at the beginning of the 20th century. It displays the tradition of kapustnitsa ("cabbage works"), a communal work to salt cabbage for the winter.

In 1909, it became his diploma work at the graduation course of the Higher Art School at the Imperial Academy of Arts. The artist received a gold medal for it Candidate of Art History Galina Tuluzakova called this picture "the most significant and harmonious" multifigure composition of the artist. Kapustnitsa is one of only four large genre works by Nicolai Fechin. It is currently part of the collection and is presented in the permanent exposition of the Research Museum of the Russian Academy of Arts in St. Petersburg.

The painting Kapustnitsa was presented at two major pre-revolutionary exhibitions in St. Petersburg and Venice, where it was noticed by art critics and the public. There is an extensive scientific and popular literature on this painting by Nicolai Fechin, written by both Soviet and Russian art historians. The artist's work on the canvas is well documented and described in the memoirs of numerous contemporaries.

== Cabbage salting in Russian peasants' life ==
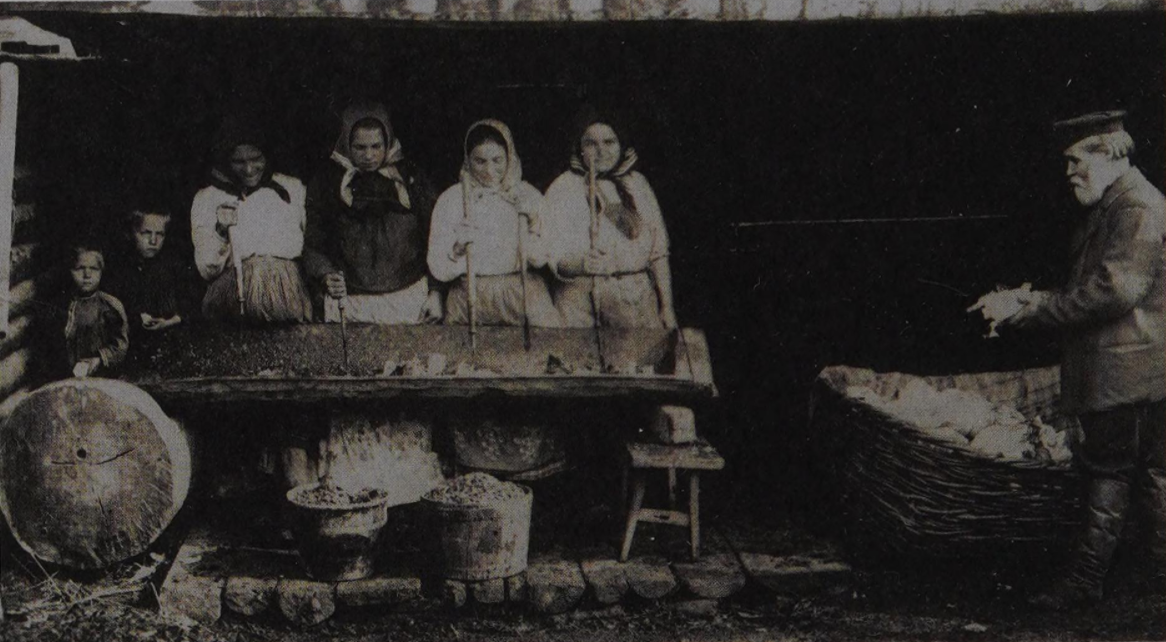
Cabbage preparation for winter. Photo of the end of the 19th century

Russian peasants had a concept toloka (the art historian and museum curator Pyotr Dulsky (1879–1956) called this custom podmoga (подмога), "helping"). Toloka was helping fellow villagers with work they could not do on their own. Such help was common in harvesting and haymaking, as well as in preparing vegetables for winter. The toloka also served as a means of entertainment for young peasants. The tolokas which peasant girls took part in were kapustki (or kapustnitsa) and supryadki (yarn spinning). Kapustnitsa — helping to prepare cabbage for winter— was organized not only in the countryside, but also in small provincial towns. It was organized every year on the occasion of the Feast of the Cross (September 14 [27]). The work usually lasted more than two weeks and was finished only on Pokrov Day (October 1 [14]), when the marriage season usually began in the village. Usually 10 to 15 girls were invited (this number depended on the harvest and, accordingly, the expected amount of work) to be given away. After finishing work in one house, the girls would often move to another. They dressed smartly for work, expecting to attract the attention of their peers, and brought cleavers for cutting cabbage.

When the workers arrived, the owners would set up a separate table for snacks. The boys would come without invitations, usually bringing sweets. They not only watched the girls work, but also helped them: they closed the barrels filled with cabbage and took them to the cellar. They were also responsible for entertaining the girls with jokes and compliments. In the evenings, after work, people used to organize circle dances, traditionally called khorovod.

== Image on the canvas ==
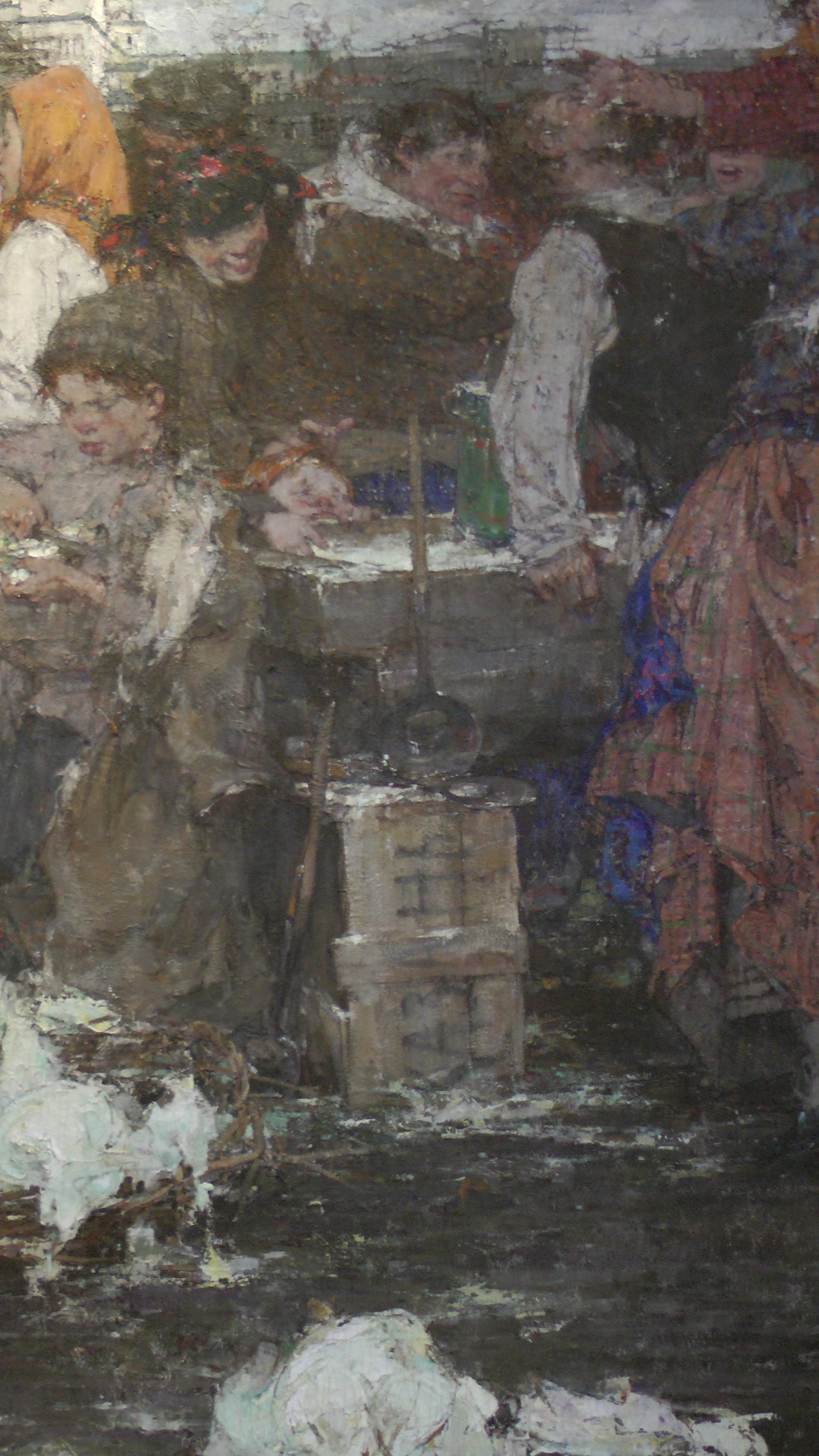
Capustnitsa. Fragment of the right part of the painting

The subject of the painting was an episode from the life of a Russian village. The whole village gathers to salt cabbage for the winter. The painting combines the festive joy and the gloom of monotonous physical labor, health and misery, beauty and ugliness. The events of the painting take place in a peasant's yard. The peasants are already dressed quite warmly. Above the wooden houses there is a narrow strip of bright and clear sky. Neighbors have gathered to shred cabbage in the traditional way. A woman and a boy are cutting stalks from the cabbage. Behind the boy's back is a tall wooden trough for chopping cabbage. The hosts have already begun to treat the workers.

The artist arranged the figures in a semicircle, "the clearest expression of the unity of the action". Peasant women peel and chop cabbage, a girl passes around a carafe of vodka, children take advantage of the commotion to eat stalks, men and teenagers are "tied to a trough of chopped cabbage, which a little boy pulls at with all his might". The painting is filled with noise, laughter, and conversation. The faces of the figures are grotesque, sometimes distorted to the point of ugliness, deliberately emphasized by the artist. Galina Tuluzakova noted, however, that Fechin's grotesqueness does not look like caricature, but affirms the unity of the beautiful and the ugly. There are also humorous details in the painting. For example, the trough of cabbage stands on a box labeled "Kazan," and the viewer can only see the colorful skirt of the bent peasant woman on the left edge of the canvas, so they will not immediately understand what is depicted in this fragment. The baby's face next to the basin makes the public smile.

Peter Dulsky emphasized two main plans on the canvas: in the foreground on the left, a well-fed peasant woman stands with a cabbage and a knife. Cabbage is scattered on the ground in front of her. Dulsky noticed that the type of woman in the picture is repeated in the images of several figures, and suggested that Fechin may have used the same model for several female figures. Directly opposite the peasant woman is a boy cutting cabbage leaves. Behind the first plan, with a shift to the center of the canvas, is a scene of refreshment — a girl with a tray containing shot glasses of vodka is offering a drink to the workers and their assistants. Further to the right, Fechin painted a scene of cabbage chopping.

== History of painting's creation ==
=== Nicolai Fechin in 1909 ===
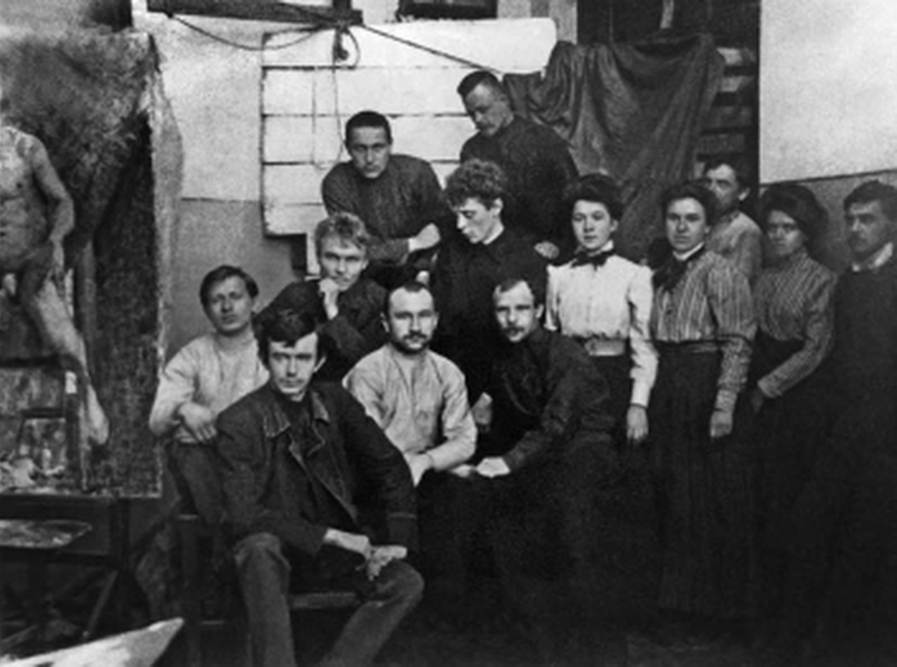
Nicolai Fechin together with the Kazan Art School students, 1908. In the second row, second from the left is Fechin, to his right is Alexander Solovyov.

The painting was created by the artist in 1909 as a final work in his fifth year of study at the Higher Art School of the Imperial Academy of Arts.

Galina Tuluzakova wrote that Nicolai Fechin finally formed as an artist at the Academy after Ilya Repin left in 1907 (Fechin had been his student since 1902). From Repin, he took an interest in genre painting and psychological portraiture, brushstrokes, and got close to Impressionism. From the Academy and Repin he learned the moral principles that would guide his work for many years: sympathy for ordinary people, humanism, and a belief in the transformative power of art. Another source of Fechin's inspiration at that time was the artistic atmosphere of St. Petersburg at the beginning of the 20th century: the paintings of the artists of Mir iskusstva, Union of Russian Artists and the first experiments of the future avant-garde artists also influenced the formation of the world view of the author of Kapustnitsa.

The artist Nikita Sverchkov —Fechin's student at the Kazan Art School in 1909— described him as a slender young man with blond hair who walked with a light and quick gait. Fechin wore a kosovorotka shirt and jacket without a tie (or a blouse with patch pockets) and dark trousers. Sverchkov noted Fechin's proud look, energy, and will. He looked like a simple worker, but in his eyes "the fire of creative inspiration burned". A contemporary claimed that Fechin was not handsome (he was even called "walnut cake" for his earthy complexion), but his charming smile made people like him.

=== Preparing Kapustnitsa's creation ===
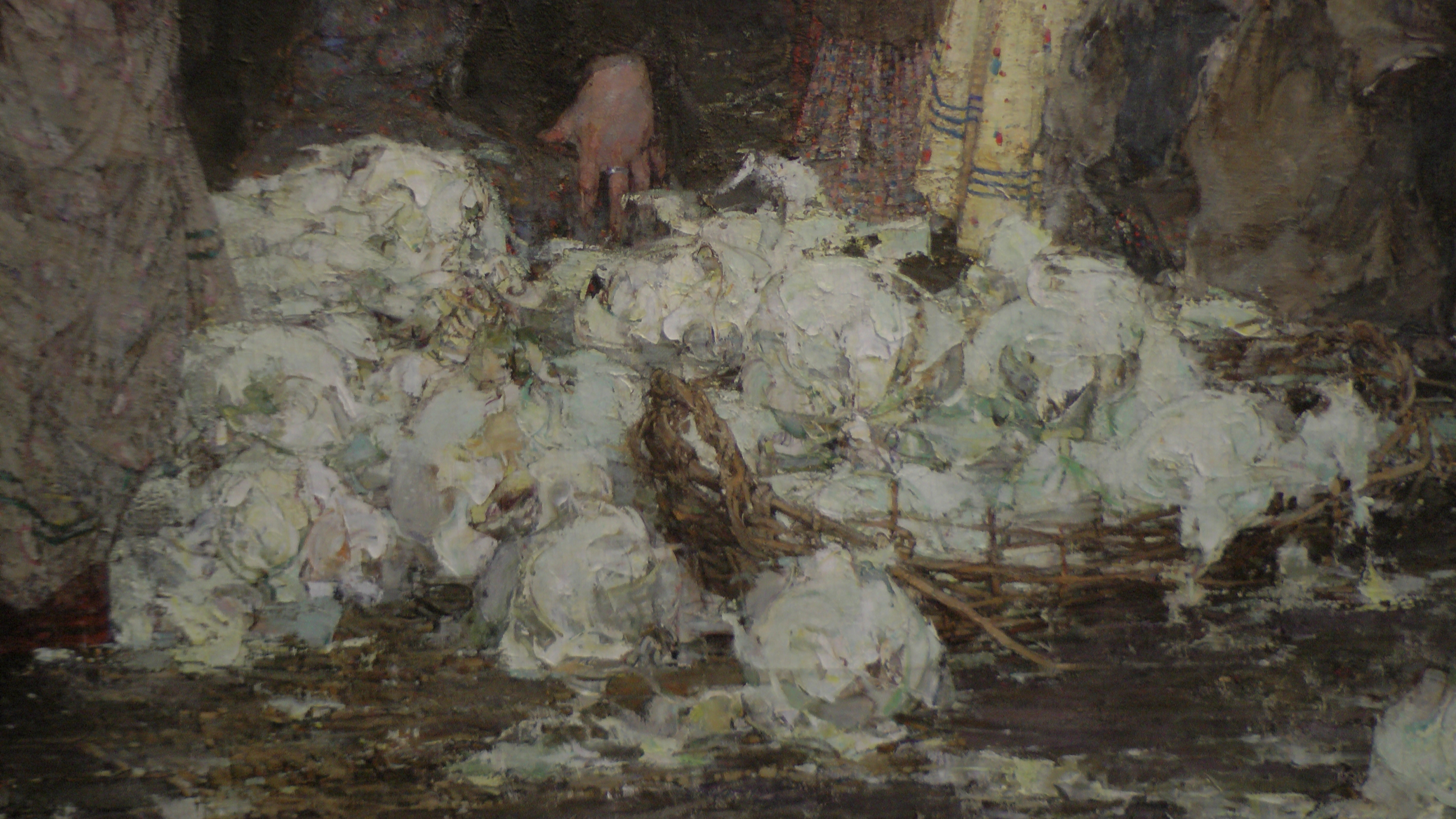
Fragment of Nicolai Fechin's painting Capustnitsa

Art and local historian Peter Dulsky wrote that Nicolai Fechin had the idea of painting Kapustnitsa in 1907. The creation of the painting was preceded by a long period of work by the artist, collecting materials from the field, determining the color and composition. It is believed that the artist collected materials in Pushkarka near Arzamas in preparation for the future final work. Dmitry Seryakov, a student of art history, claimed that the artist came to Pushkarka to make sketches and that it was here that he had the idea for the canvas. Nicolai Fechin made numerous pencil sketches, studies and sketches of compositions in the technique of oil painting. To date, only two drawings are known to experts — Peasant Woman (Young Woman with a Tray) (1909, paper, charcoal, 22 × 16 inches) and Peasant Woman in a Jacket (1909, paper, charcoal, 23 × 14 inches). Both were for a long time in the private collection of Iya Feshina-Brenham, the artist's daughter, in Taos, New Mexico in the United States. There is also a known pastel sketch (1909, paper, pastel, 64 × 43 cm, Samara Regional Art Museum, Zh-902, the sketch came in 1956 from the Ministry of Culture of the RSFSR) and three or four gouache sketches (State Museum of Fine Arts of the Republic of Tatarstan) Kapustnitsa (1909, paper, ink, gouache, sheet size — 23.5 × 33.2 cm, drawing size — 14.2 × 23.9 cm, inv. g-1844), Kapustnitaa (1909, paper, cardboard, ink, gouache, 22.9 × 34 cm, 15.5 × 27 cm, inv. g-1834), Kapustnitsa (1909, paper, cardboard, ink, gouache, 22.9×34 cm, 15.5 × 27 cm, inv. g-1834), Kapustnitsa (1909, paper, gouache, sheet size — 23.5 × 33.4 cm, the size of the figure — 15 × 27 cm, g-1848). (Note: The book Research Museum of the Academy of Arts of the USSR lists only three sketches, although Galina Tuluzakova wrote about four in her doctoral thesis. All of them come from the collection of N.P. Grechkin (and before that from the collection of S.P. Belkovich) and were acquired by the Kazan Museum in 1978. These sketches were presented at an exhibition in the capital of Tatarstan in 1991.)

External images
- | Nicola Fechin. Sketch to the painting Kapustnitsa
- | Nicola Fechin. Kapustnitsa's sketch after restoration, 1907-1908

The Russian Soviet "peasant poet" and artist, the last chairman of the Peredvizhniki Society and the first chairman of the Association of Artists of Revolutionary Russia —Pavel Radimov— recalled that in the early years of his acquaintance with Nicolai Fechin, the latter showed him a set of sketches of twelve of his works. Among them were sketches for Kapustnitsa. Radimov wrote that the artist later created his canvases on the basis of these sketches.

In 2017, after the restoration at the All-Russian Center of Art Research and Restoration named of I. E. Grabar, the sketches for Kapustnitsa were presented at a temporary exhibition of this institution, along with other works by Nicolai Fechin. At the exhibition of 2006-2007 they were presented even before the beginning of the restoration.

Galina Tuluzakova considered the two preparatory charcoal drawings for Kapustnitsa, depicting peasant women, as finished graphic works. One of them is an image of a woman holding a plate in her hands. It is drawn with several lines along the contours of the figure, the hands and the handkerchief. The figure, however, creates the illusion of volume. The lines reveal the construction of the body, detailing the requirements of anatomy. The drawing is laconic, but the gradations of the lines are varied. Some are bold and black, while others are thin and barely visible. The lines obey a restless rhythm, and the white space of the paper creates the illusion of an airy environment.

=== Work on painting ===
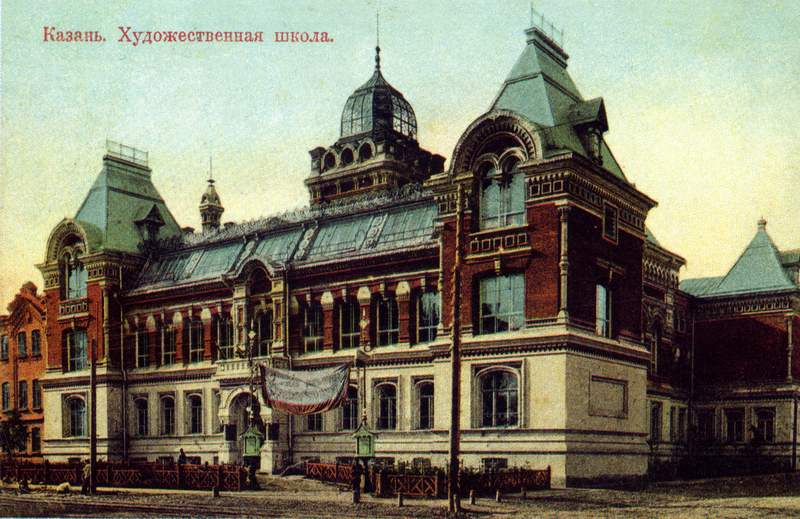
The main facade of the Kazan Art School, where Nicolai Fechin worked on the canvas, on a pre-revolutionary postcard.

The artist and teacher Alexander Solovyov wrote in his memoirs that Nicolai Fechin arrived in Kazan from St. Petersburg in the fall of 1908, when he was transferred to the nature class. He had been appointed by the Imperial Academy of Arts to teach painting and drawing at the Kazan Art School. Dmitri Seryakov specified that Fechin took only a temporary teaching position, but with a full salary, and was given a studio in the new building of the school. He was also given full freedom to work with students. The artist himself, according to Seryakov, assessed such conditions of stay in Kazan as acceptable for creativity in general and for the completion of competitive academic work, which he was working on at that time.

At the Kazan Art School, Fechin anticipated completing his final work, which he was not permitted to paint as a free student in academic workshops. His arrival in Kazan was an event that attracted the attention not only of the students and teachers of the school, but also of the entire Kazan art community. The new teacher immediately made a strong impression on the students. Their admiration increased when they saw the Kapustnitsa (Solovyov calls this canvas Kapustnik), which was placed in the assembly hall of the Kazan Art School to complete the work on it. It also made a great impression on the teachers of the school. The artist German Melentiev wrote in his memoirs that when Fechin placed his unfinished work in one of the halls of the art school, all approaches to it were blocked. Curious students peered through the keyhole to see Fechin at work. One of the school employees, feeling sorry for the students, began to open the hall for them when Nicolai Fechin was absent. The students, fearing the artist's return, only had brief glimpses of the unfinished canvas, struggled to understand the subject, but were nonetheless struck by the master’s immense size and unconventional technique. The diffuse light in the hall gave the painting an "enchanting and exciting" character.

On the contrary, the Soviet artist Moses Spiridonov wrote in his memoirs that Nicolai Fechin allowed his students to visit the workshop hall where the canvas was being worked on. He wrote: “We went to him with excitement and awe. What we saw was unusual, delighted, and amazed us". Spiridonov recalled that a huge canvas stood on an easel. At first glance, he could not even discern what was depicted on the unfinished painting. Decorative spots caught his eye, and the human figures appeared as dark silhouettes. Only after some time did separate “details” (such as the boy at the trough with cabbage and the gray sky) begin to emerge, eventually forming a cohesive scene. Gradually, the artist's intention became clearer. Spiridonov noted that he particularly liked the foreground, with cabbage sprouts and leaves scattered on the ground. The painting seemed filled with air and light. The memoirist commented on the “tangibility of the texture of the objects,” the unprecedented freshness, and the “novelty in the ways of conveying real reality.” Despite having visited numerous museums, including those in the capital, and having seen masterpieces by the greatest masters of the past, Spiridonov had never encountered paintings executed in such a peculiar, original, and unique manner. He observed that something about the painting drew the viewer in, compelling a careful examination.

Academics Elena Petinova and Svetlana Chervonnaya, based on the testimonies of contemporaries, wrote that Nicolai Fechin, while working on the canvas, brought an entire carriage of cabbage and painted it from life directly onto the final version of the painting — “into the canvas". According to Petinova, Fechin sought typages in the villages surrounding Kazan (which contrasts with other researchers' data pointing to Pushkarka in the Nizhny Novgorod province), where he went for sketches.

== The painting in the museum's collection ==
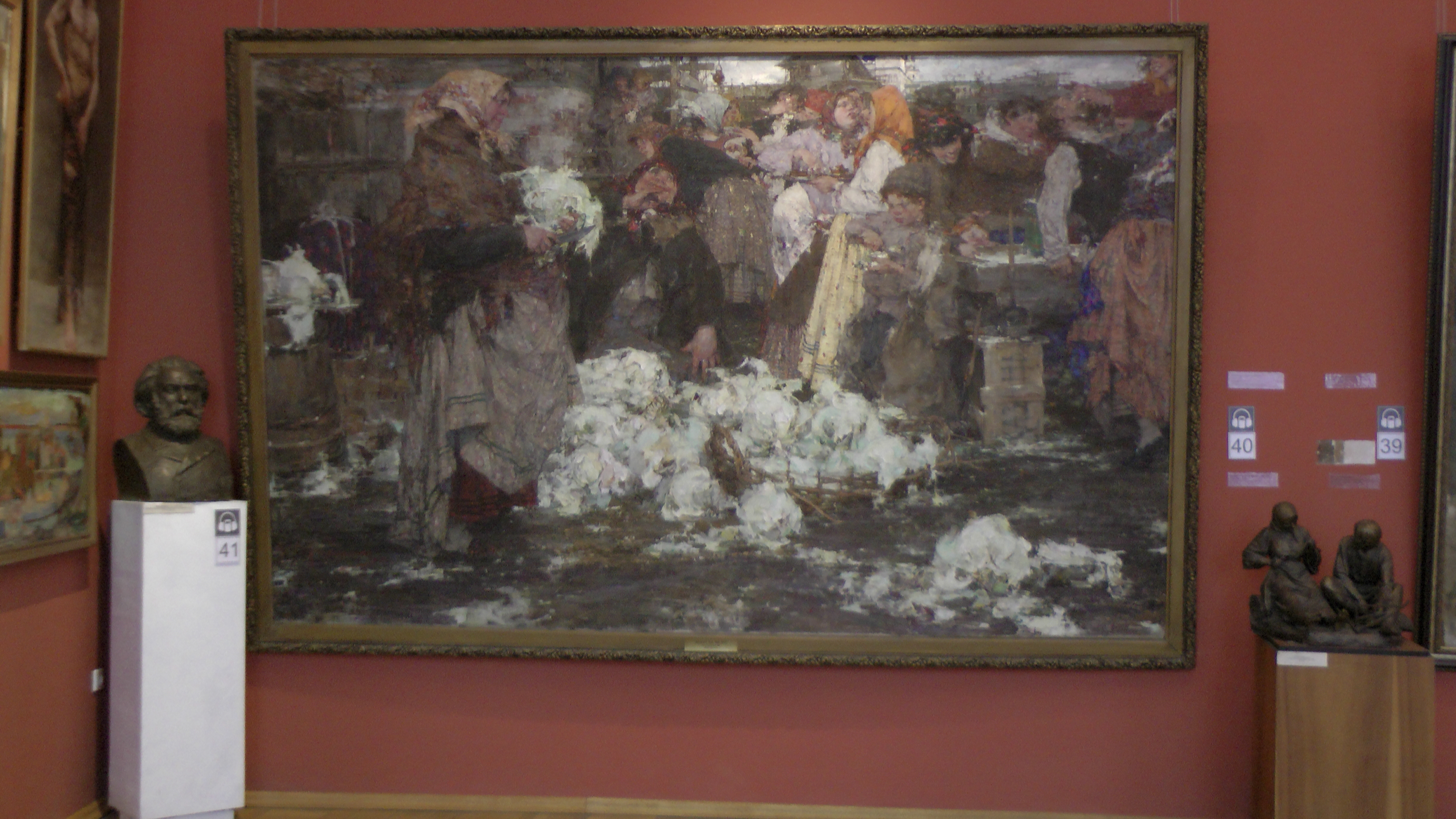
Kapustnitsa in the permanent exhibition of the Russian Academy of Arts, October 2020

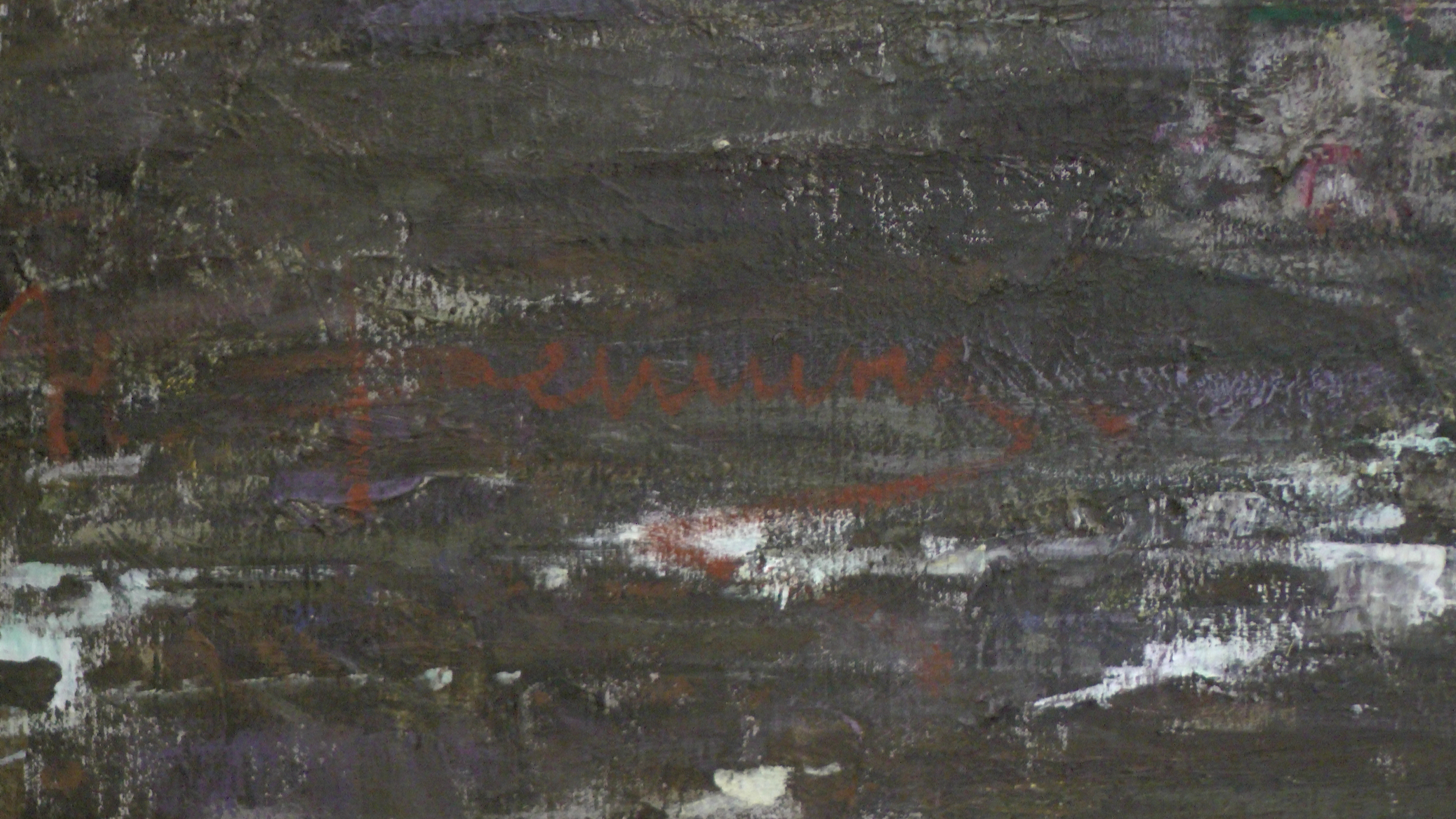
The artist's signature on the painting Kapustnitsa

Kapustnitsa is a canvas painting measuring 219 × 344 cm. (Note: The book Research Museum of the Academy of Arts of the USSR indicates a different size: 240 × 245 cm.) The artist, Nicolai Fechin, signed it in the lower left corner. It is part of the collection at the Research Museum of the Russian Academy of Arts in St. Petersburg and is displayed in its permanent exhibition (Hall No. 5). The inventory number for this painting in the museum's collection is Zh-1498. Nicolai Fechin left this painting, along with two others —Portrait of an Unknown Woman (also known as Lady in Purple, 1908, canvas, oil, 102 × 79 cm, State Russian Museum, Zh-2281) and Exit from the Catacombs after Prayer (1903, canvas, oil, 91 × 199 cm, Research Museum of the Russian Academy of Arts, Zh-414)— at the Imperial Academy of Arts. These works were meant as models for students of the Higher Art School. This tradition at the institution involved keeping the best works of students, from their early sketches to competition pieces, as "samples of academic education". These pieces were used for copying in classes, studying composition, and learning individual techniques. Kapustnitsa was left at the Academy immediately after its display at an exhibition there in 1909.

Nicolai Fechin was awarded the title of artist and a golden medal for his painting Kapustnitsa, which granted him the privilege of a trip abroad. During this trip, he visited France, the German Empire, and Italy, and some sources also mention the Austro-Hungarian Empire. During his travels, he became acquainted with major museum collections in these countries. Additionally, Fechin received the right to the rank of X class when entering the civil service and the right to teach drawing in educational institutions.

In 1914, Kapustnitsa was presented at the International Exhibition in Venice, where it made a strong impression on the public. The Russian and Soviet sculptor Sergei Konyonkov, in his memoirs, even erroneously remarked about Fechin's painting: "...having been in Italy in 1914, so far [it] has not found its way back to the Motherland largely due to the fact that the coloristic perfection of this thing in no way gives the Italians the strength to make a legitimate and worthy act of restitution. They simply don't want to part with Kapustnitsa".

== Contemporaries about Kapustnitsa ==
The Imperial Academy of Arts received Nicolai Fechin's painting enthusiastically. The reaction of the media was different. The art critic Yakov Tugendhold wrote in the monthly literary, scientific, and political journal Sovremenniy Mir, that Fechin was a gifted artist but was unable to “cognize or direct his talent.” According to Tugendhold, he is not a decorator but an “intimist,” so his painting has only “separate beautiful pieces of painting”. The painting itself is not characterized by unity and harmony and resembles a large panel or carpet.

During the public demonstration of the painting at the competition of the Imperial Academy, the press spoke of it rather reservedly. In an article in the newspaper Novoe Vremya, art critic, painter, and writer Nicolai Kravchenko positively noted the subtle coloring of Kapustnitsa, but immediately wrote that the active use of bright green color destroys the color scheme on the canvas.

Nicolai Nikonov, an artist and one of the founders of the Association of Artists of Revolutionary Russia, saw the painting Kapustnitsa at the Kazan Art School. Many years later, he wrote about the shock he experienced when looking at it. He was struck by almost everything in this painting: temperament, technique, harmony of tone, “the aroma of fresh cabbage leaves,” the spontaneity and motleyness of the depicted objects, the depiction of characters in motion, their unusual angles, and “the even light of a gray autumn day.” None of the large crowd of spectators who gathered at the painting tried to give it critical feedback. Nikonov recalled that he heard someone utter the lines, “Look at it and learn!” and “You can do it, too!”. After the demonstration of the finished painting at the Kazan Art School, Fechin's authority among the students became unquestionable. Some students were proud to study with him, while others dreamed of going to him for training.

The artist Lyudmila Burliuk, David Burliuk's sister, noted that all visitors to the museum of the Imperial Academy of Arts usually paid attention to Fechin's canvas, which was presented in the museum's permanent exhibition. She cited a quote she heard from a young man who came from the provinces, noting its immediacy: “This is the first category — this is our Fechin, well written, such a brushstroke, what a twist!”

== Soviet art historians about the painting ==
Soviet art historian Iosif Brodsky, in his monograph Repin the Teacher, noted various influences on Nicolai Fechin's work during the period of the creation of Kapustnitsa: Repin's realism, impressionism, and naturalism. The researcher wrote that Fechin was sharply negative about the depiction of folk life in the paintings of Filipp Malyavin, but he himself was “excessive and excessively free in the ‘pictorial’ expression of folk scenes”. Brodsky considered Kapustnista and Bearing Away the Bride to be caricatures of village life and devoid of truth, although he found these paintings peculiar in their painterly manner and knife painting technique. The edition, published in 1961, noted that the artist was fascinated not by the domestic scene but by the opportunity to convey spontaneous fun. Fechin tried to convey the movement of characters with the help of “flickering colorful spots”. The author of the canvas was praised for his “hot temperament ... sophisticated sense of colorful tone, life ease". It was noted that, in depicting an episode from everyday life, the artist succeeded in portraying “a cheerful, noisy, and tipsy day”.

In the biographical sketch in the catalog of Fechin's works, presented at an exhibition in Moscow in 1964, the painting Kapustnitsa (though not presented at the exhibition) was noted for its compositional maturity, the “sharpness” of its characteristics, and brilliant technique. The Guide to the Research Museum of the Academy of Arts, published in 1965, noted in Nicolai Fechin's painting “a broad pictorial style and sharp expressiveness”.

Alexander Solovyov wrote in his memoirs that decades later it was much easier for him to make sense of this painting by Fechin and understand what had so delighted him in his youth. In his opinion, “the power of the impact of this painting lies in the decorativeness that gives special significance to this late autumn festival”. When viewed from a distance, the viewer “only sees a series of decorative spots, spectacular in their coloring and composition”. When the viewer approaches the canvas, however, he distinguishes “a sea of pale green cabbage leaves, an autumn gray sky, and cheerful, mischievous village youth at the cabbage chopping". Solovyov drew attention to the technique of execution of the canvas: the matte application of colors, the skillful depiction of the texture of fabrics, cabbage, earth, and other objects, the skillful transfer of movement, and the expressiveness of the figures and their faces. In his opinion, the great power of impact on the viewer comes from the connection of “direct impression of nature with free masterful execution”.

Art historian Sofia Kaplanova wrote in her biographical sketch of the artist that Kapustnitsa demonstrated Fechin's maturity as an artist. The composition of the canvas is vivid and relaxed, and the images of the characters are lifelike, drawing the viewer into the atmosphere of a cheerful holiday. She noted the difference between the sketches and the final canvas: the sketches are characterized by contrasting compositional solutions, intense color, and grotesque images of characters, while in the final version, the color is muted and the grotesque elements are softened. Kaplanova placed Kapustnitsa on par with the best genre paintings by Abram Arkhipov and Philip Malyavin.

Doctor of Art History Svetlana Chervonnaya, in her monograph The Art of Tatarstan, noted that in Kapustnitsa Nicolai Fechin managed to reveal both the beauty and strength of the people of labor and “‘wilderness’ life in the wilderness”.

The authors of the book Research Museum of the Academy of Arts of the USSR, published in 1989, characterized the canvas Kapustnitsa as an independent and original work, noting its virtuosic skill and the artist's skillful creation of a festive atmosphere of folk fun. Thanks to the successfully constructed composition, the artist places the viewer among the participants of this holiday. According to the authors, the painting occupies a well-deserved place in Russian genre painting of the early 20th century.

== Contemporary Russian art historians about the painting ==
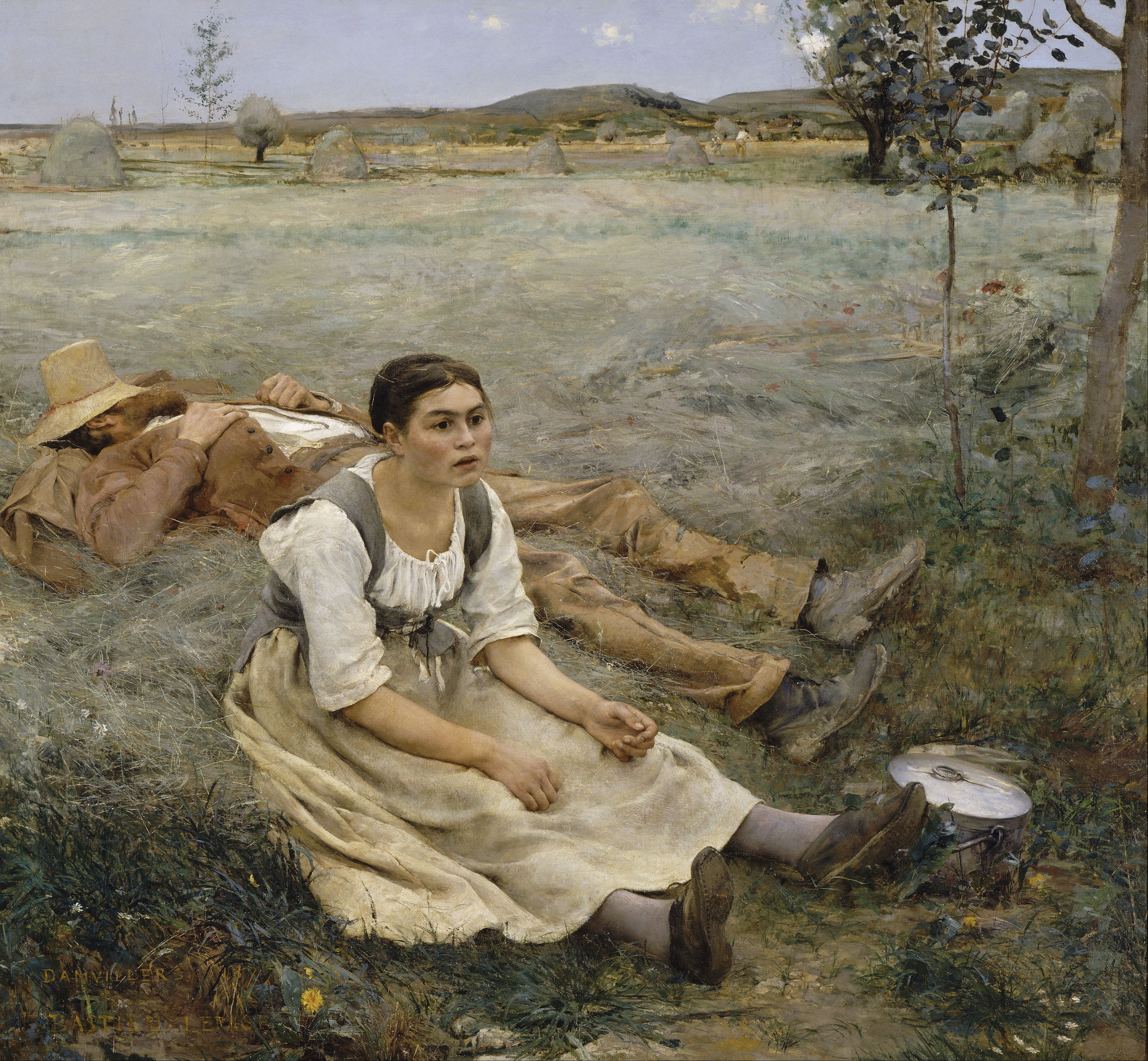
Jules Bastien-Lepage. Haymaking, 1877

Doctor of Art History Tatiana Mozhenok compared Nicolai Fechin's paintings with the French artist Jules Bastien-Lepage's and concluded that the Russian artist was characterized by “broad, free, temperamental writing,” while Bastien-Lepage's genre paintings were created in the style of photographic naturalism.

=== Sergey Voronkov about the painting ===
Art historian and artist Sergei Voronkov wrote about the main feature of the painting's composition—“linear rhythmic repetitions” expressed “in the arc-shaped lines of the contours of figures and separate groups of characters.” He found similarities in the construction of the composition of Kapustnitsa and the painting Bearing Away the Bride, painted a year before it. On both canvases, in the left part of the painting, there is a large figure, the same horizon line with narrow strips of sky, a reproduced foreground, and the ground under the feet of the characters.

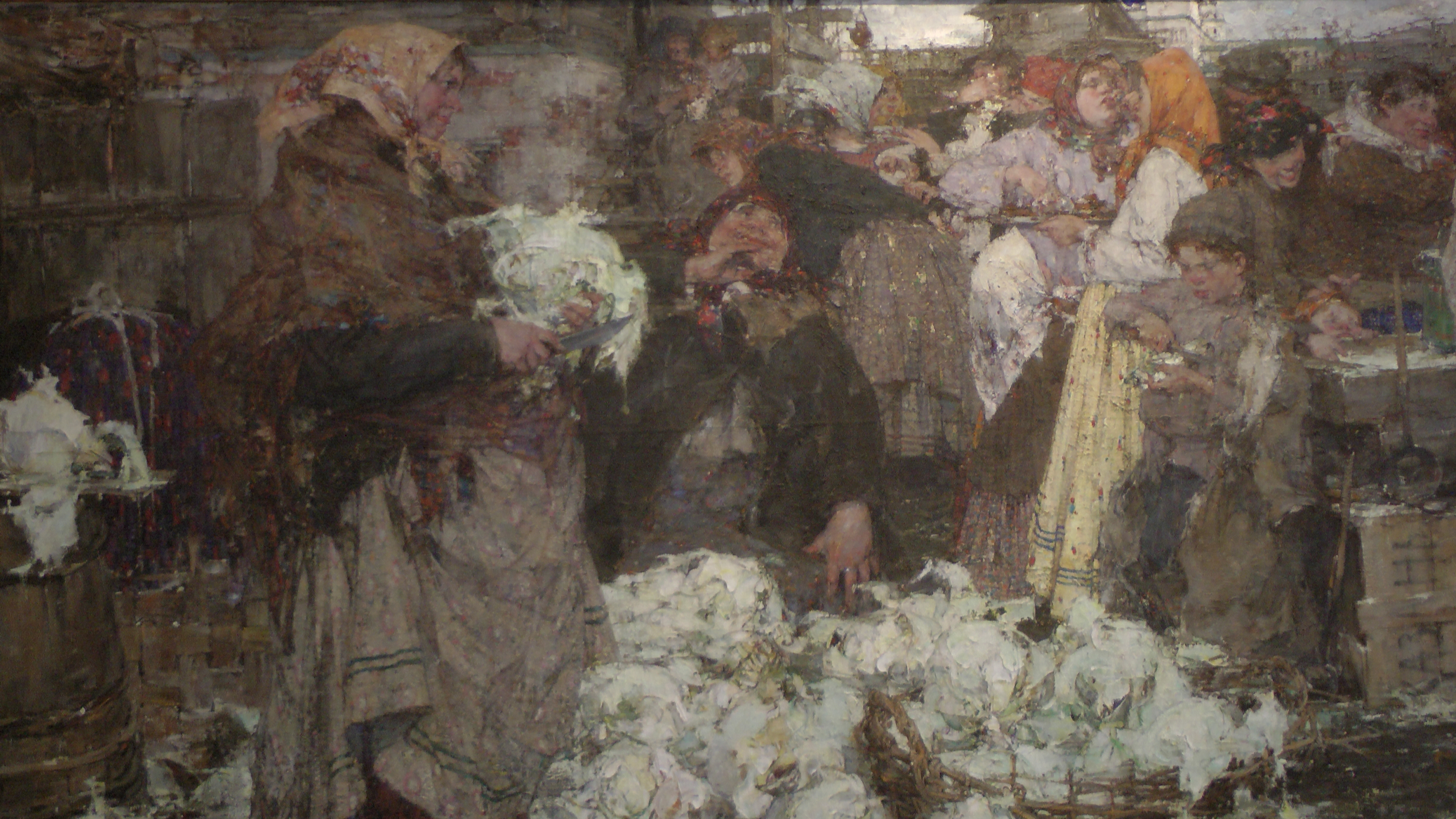
Capustnitsa, the central part of the painting

Voronkov argued that in the painting Kapustnitsa, a geometric center is emphasized. In his opinion, this is the brush in the hand of the seated peasant woman. The line of the left shoulder of this figure directs the viewer's eye to the compositional center of the painting—a face blurred by a smile, somewhat caricatured. The viewer sees the face of a pregnant woman with a cabbage and a knife, whose voluptuous figure resembles the shape of a matryoshka doll. To the right of this figure stands a boy cutting a pokeweed. From Sergei Voronkov's point of view, this is the second compositional center of the canvas. Behind his figure is a girl with a tray: although she is in the distant background, her clothes are the brightest spot on the canvas. The researcher considered these four figures to be the main protagonists of the painting. They are the ones that the artist has worked out in the greatest detail with his brush. The gaze of the woman standing on the left draws the viewer's attention to the background, where there are "closed" (as Voronkov put it) groups of figures. The canvas is animated by angles, gestures, and "rhythmic repetitions in the contours of the figures".

Voronkov noted the "restrained silver-gray, cold coloring", which the artist complemented with "pearly shimmers of light green, emerald, white, and pinkish tones" (these are the tones used to paint the cabbage). Nicolai Fechin masterfully conveyed air and light, preserving the "purity and sound of color". According to the art historian, the most beautiful and convincing fragments are the images of clothes, especially the folds of women's dresses. Voronkov observed that the artist used several techniques of color application in one painting: "softly smoothed strokes", "bodily dynamic painting knife's strokes with painting over the glaze", and "dry brush". The researcher highlighted the artist's innovation, readiness to see the beauty in the village plot, and ability to reflect the impression of nature through pictorial means.

=== Elena Petinova about the painting ===
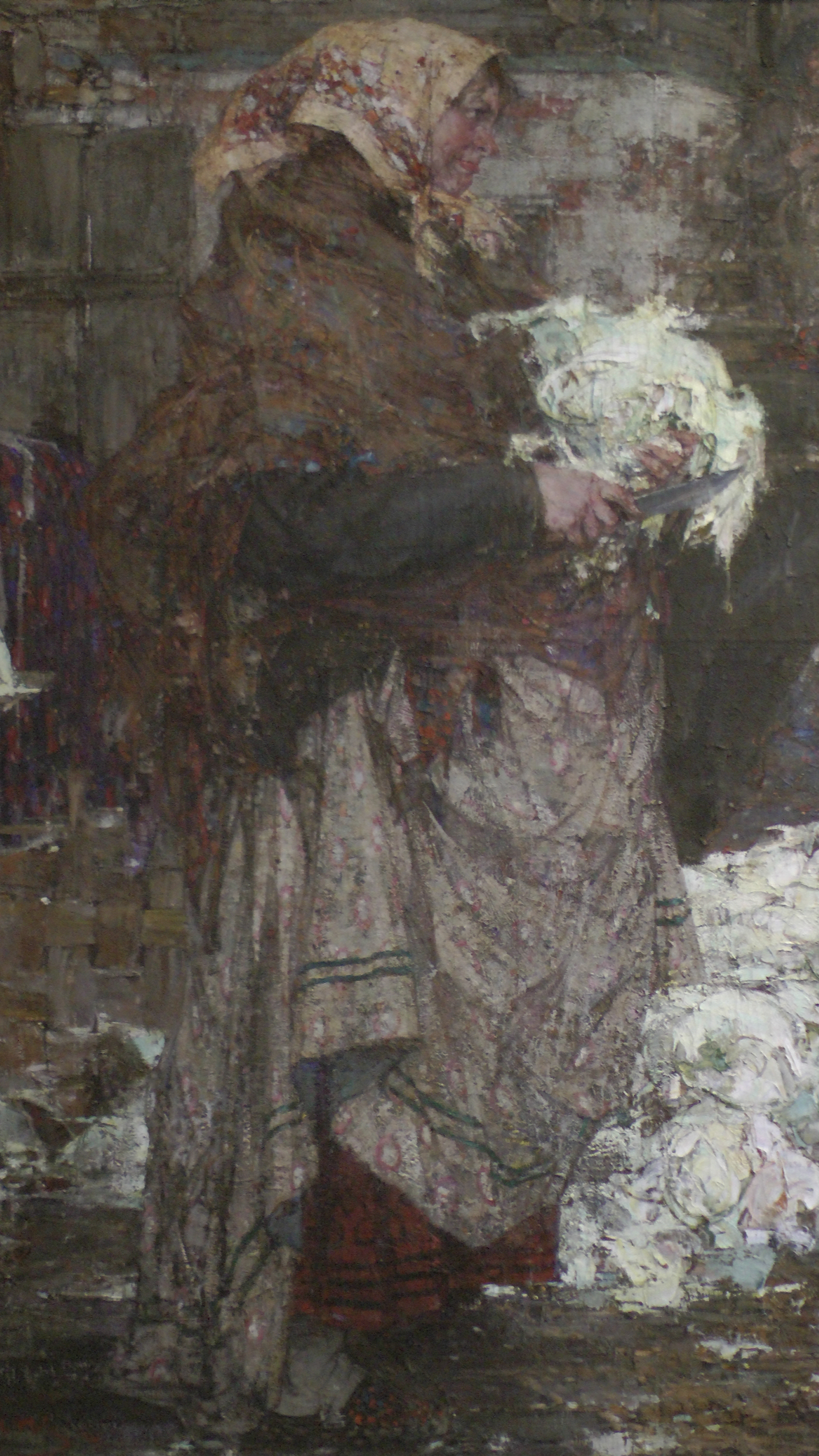
Fragment of the painting Kapustnitsa (peasant woman with a bob and a knife)

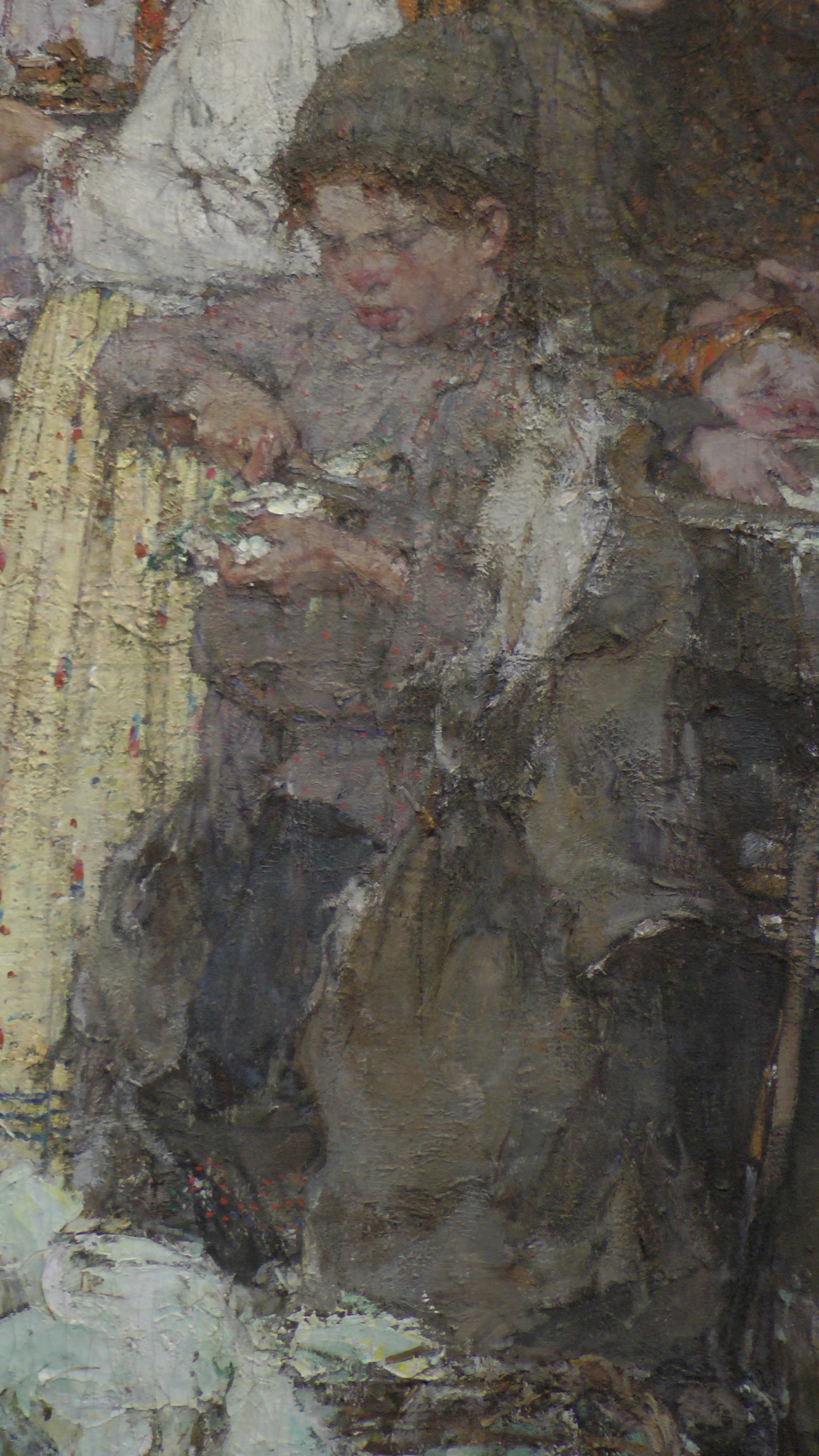
Fragment of the painting Kapustnitsa (a boy with a cabbage stalk)

In the book From Academism to Art Nouveau: Russian painting of the late 19th - early 20th century, candidate of art history Elena Petinova wrote that the plot of the canvas is characterized by unpretentiousness and truthfulness. She believed that the painting has a semantic center—the figure of a full peasant woman in a high-lifted light skirt, who holds a cabbage sprout and a knife for shredding. Its cheerfulness combined with monotonous physical labor evoked in the researcher's mind the female images of Fechin's contemporaries — Philip Malyavin, Abram Arkhipov, and Sergey Ivanov. She wrote that although the artist clearly admires his heroine, her figure on the canvas is grotesque. The artist also endowed other characters of Kapustnitsa with grotesque elements. At the same time, Petinova agreed with Kaplanova that the grotesque final version is softened compared to the preparatory work for the canvas.

Elena Petinova pointed out that Kapustnitsa, as well as other works of Nicolai Fechin from this period, is made in a special technique. The artist himself impregnated the canvas with casein glue. Thanks to this, the ground was not affected by moisture and the oil was removed from the colors. Although the canvas is painted with oil colors, they resemble the matte nature of tempera. The mattness was complemented by an extremely restrained palette with a predominance of pearl grays and ochres. However, this technique caused the paint layer to darken over time, and in the darkest places tonal nuances — gradations of the same chromatic tone — began to disappear, and these fragments now appear to the viewer painted in a uniform black color. Fechin worked on the canvas not only with a brush, but also with a knife, some fragments of the canvas —the faces and hands of the figures— he simply formed with his hands, using dry gloss.

=== Galina Tuluzakova about the painting ===
Galina Tuluzakova, an art history graduate and author of several monographs on the artist's work, considered Kapustnitsa and Bearing Away the Bride to be two of Fechin's most important works in genre painting. She wrote that the composition of Kapustnitsa is determined by the distribution of paint spots. In her opinion, the canvas is less complex "in terms of dynamics" than Bearing Away the Bride made a year before. This is due to the pronounced center of the composition, which is emphasized by a large light spot below the center of the painting. This spot is formed by a mountain of cabbage sprouts lying directly on the ground. Adjacent to this bright mass is a contrasting spot — a peasant woman in dark clothing. The painting has two "tonal poles" — white and black. In general, according to Tuluzakova, it is the "rhythm of light and dark spots" that forms the structure of the entire canvas. Bearing Away the Bride" is asymmetrical, Kapustnitsa, on the other hand, follows the principle of symmetry, though not "mathematically literally". In the transition from white to dark, the color passes through a whole range of shades "from purple to yellow and cadmium tones" in the depiction of the actors, and in the depiction of the landscape it turns into gray. Golden-yellow and purple colors are contrasted, which, according to Galina Tuluzakova, should evoke associations with the translucency of rare rays of sunshine on a cloudy day. The purple tones serve to emphasize the golden ones.

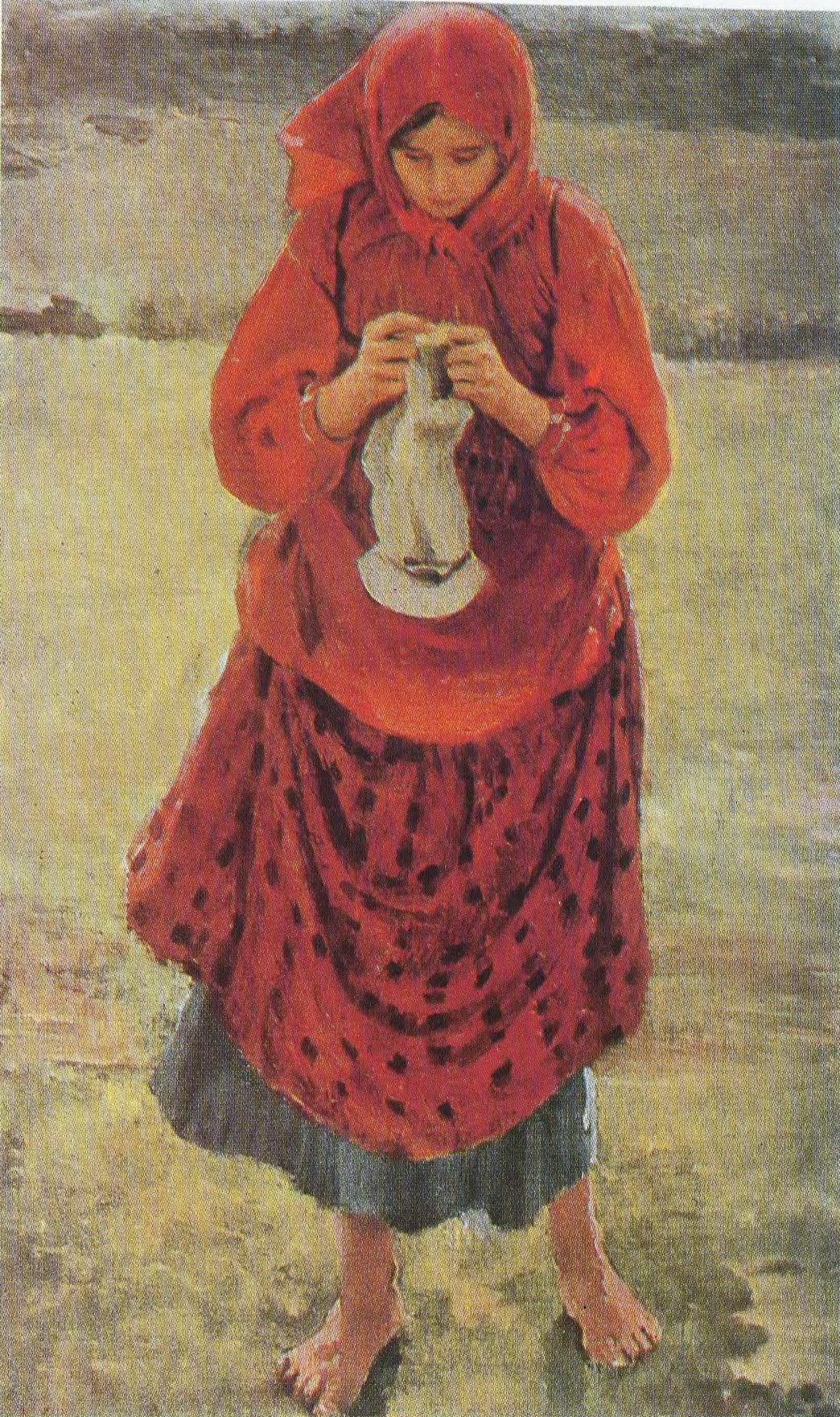
Philip Malyavin. Peasant Girl with Stocking, 1895

The artist succeeded in creating the effect of a shimmering pearly surface. Although Fechin's color palette is diverse, it is characterized by restraint. Nevertheless, in some fragments of the canvas, bright color combinations are used. One example is the juxtaposition of bright blue and yellow in the skirt of one of the peasant women in the left corner of the painting. Tuluzakova believed that here Fechin was anticipating the color contrasts of his Indigenous people's portraits, which he painted in Taos during the last period of his life. The painterly texture of "dense" colors creates the illusion of life and movement, creating an atmosphere of cheerful turmoil. Out of the "chaos of the colorful medley" emerge characters with distinct individuality, accentuated gestures and poses. Their movements are motivated by the action, but the narrative beginning is minimized. The monolithic nature of the enthusiastic crowd, as in the painting Bearing Away the Bride, is conveyed by Nicolai Fechin through the extreme density of the figures in the painting and the overlapping of the figures, as well as through the "middle tone of the painting", where the symmetry of the color spots (for example, the yellow shawl of the peasant woman in the foreground corresponds to the yellow spots of the shawl and skirt of the girl with the tray) gives the composition wholeness. The "vanishing point" coincides with the dark building in the background. According to Tuluzakova, it is the vertex of the triangle in which the artist has placed the scene. In Kapustnitsa, the depth of the space contrasts with the flatness of the painting, the volumetry of the image of signs with the decorative, graphic with the painterly, naturalism with the conventional.

Galina Tuluzakova believed that the canvas reflected "the dualism of the very thinking" of Nicolai Fechin. He was a proponent of realistic representation but sought to express "his intuitive sensations". For this reason, he neglected the consistency of the narrative to express the "immediacy of feeling". He succeeded in expressing a wide range of emotions that overwhelm the characters: admiration, rejection, joy, despair, expectation, and hopelessness. At the same time, these extremes merge into a whole. According to Tuluzakova, "the pulsation of the pictorial fabric" embodies the "eternal energy of life" that comes from the earth and the rough, primitive nature of the peasants. The emotional expression is balanced by the restraint of the coloring. Tuluzakova even wrote that the author did not plan "a special activity of impact" of the painting on the viewer, so he harmonized the content and formal components.

=== Dmitry Seryakov about the painting ===
In his doctoral dissertation, Seryakov noted the unconventionality of the canvas's coloration. The dominant color scheme is cold, which shifts the emphasis to the bright light green cabbage leaves (which the art historian called "the dominant coloristic dominant in the painting"), which stand out against the dark earth and the characters' clothing. Seryakov wrote that Fechin managed to convey the materiality of the cabbage leaves with color alone. The painting skillfully shades the individuality of each character, but does not carry a social burden (although the art historian insisted on the realism of the painting and the truth of its images), which is characteristic of the paintings of Fechin's mentor at the Academy of Arts, Ilya Repin. According to the scholar, the artist sought to "show the beauty of the world in a simple, seemingly mundane subject". To this end, Fechin meticulously selected types, gave them expressive poses, found the appropriate combination of colors, and assembled them on the canvas. Unlike Elena Petinova, Seryakov believed that there were no main and secondary characters on the canvas. Each of the figures is valuable as a "semantic and artistic part" of the whole.

The faces of the characters are detailed, while the clothes and cabbage leaves are symbolic. In Seriakov's opinion, this was a way of showing the importance of the characters, their brightness and individuality, "concreteness and characteristic". The researcher pointed out that the artist achieved this not only by composition and coloring, but also by technique. Seryakov argued that "the conventionality of pictorial modeling in this case does not reach the level of non finito". In his opinion, we can only speak of "natural representativeness", closeness to the manner of sketching and "optical mixing" of colors, in which "individual strokes are formed into a concrete real image". If the use of "non-finito" painters only hints at the real object, bringing its image closer to abstraction, then in Kapustnitsa Nicolai Fechin's close attention "to the subject structure" is obvious.

Dmitry Seryakov assigned Kapustnitsa to the ethnographic series in the artist's oeuvre, which is reflected in such genre paintings of his as Pouring and the earlier Bearing Away the Bride. The researcher also called these three paintings "ceremonial". According to Seryakov, Fechin's aim in them was not so much to depict scenes of folk life as to show the way of life represented in certain rituals. The gouache sketches for Kapustnitsa, according to the researcher, differ significantly from the sketches for Bearing Away the Bride or Slaughterhouse. The sketches for Kapustnitsa are characterized by a careful elaboration of details; the author describes the characters to which he wants to draw the audience's attention. The sketches for Bearing Away the Bride and Slaughterhouse are executed in gouache and watercolor. In their free manner of execution, they are close to abstract compositions, with the figures being hardly distinguishable.

== Bibliography ==
=== Sources ===
- Бурлюк, Л. Д. (1975). Могильникова Г. (ed.). Воспоминания о Н. И. Фешине // Николай Иванович Фешин. Документы, письма, воспоминания о художнике: сб (in Russian). Л.: Художник РСФСР. pp. 62–64.
- Могильникова Г., ed. (1975). Диплом Николая Фешина. Санкт-Петербург 16 дня 1909 г. / Список поощрения Н. И. Фешина за время его обучения в Высшем художественном училище. Николай Иванович Фешин. Документы, письма, воспоминания о художнике: сб. (in Russian). Л.: Художник РСФСР. pp. 22–23.
- Кравченко, Н. И. (6 November 1909). Конкурсная выставка в Академии художеств (in Russian) (Новое время ed.).
- Конёнков, С. Т. (4 February 1964). Соколиный глаз художника (in Russian) (Советская культура ed.).
- Мелентьев, Г. А. (1975). Могильникова Г. (ed.). Воспоминания о Н. И. Фешине// Николай Иванович Фешин. Документы, письма, воспоминания о художнике: сб (in Russian). Л.: Художник РСФСР. pp. 81–82.
- Никонов, Н. М. (1975). Могильникова Г. (ed.). Воспоминания о Н. И. Фешине// Николай Иванович Фешин. Документы, письма, воспоминания о художнике: сб (in Russian). Л.: Художник РСФСР. pp. 79–80.
- Радимов, П. А. (1975). Могильникова Г. (ed.). Воспоминания о Н. И. Фешине// Николай Иванович Фешин. Документы, письма, воспоминания о художнике: сб (in Russian). Л.: Художник РСФСР. pp. 120–122.
- Соловьёв, А. М. (1970). Руднев В. В. (ed.). Отрывки из дневников // Александр Соловьев. Педагог, художник, человек (in Russian). М.: Изобразительное искусство. pp. 13–65.
- Сверчков, Н. К. (1975). Могильникова Г. (ed.). Воспоминания о Н. И. Фешине // Николай Иванович Фешин. Документы, письма, воспоминания о художнике: сб (in Russian). Л.: Художник РСФСР. pp. 75–79.
- Спиридонов, М. С. (1990). Юность. Казанская художественная школа // Крылья памяти. Воспоминания художника. Воспоминания о художнике. Документы. Статьи. Письма (in Russian). Чебоксары: Чувашское книжное издательство. pp. 28–44.

=== Researches and popular sources ===
- Бродский, И. А. (1960). Высшее художественное училище Академии художеств и педагогическое наследие Репина // Репин-педагог (in Russian). М.: Академия художеств СССР. pp. 92–102.
- Ванслов В. В., Капланова С. Г., Рязанцев И. В. (1997). III. Академия художеств в конце XIX — начале XX века // Императорская академия художеств. II половина XIX — начало XX века (in Russian). М.: Изобразительное искусство. pp. 147–325. ISBN 5-85200-333-6
- Воронков, С. Н. (1999). Краткая биография Н. И. Фешина (российские годы) / Академические годы / Жанровые композиции // К вопросу о творчестве Николая Фешина. Дипломная работа, перераб. и исправл (PDF) (in Russian). СПб.: Санкт-Петербургский Академический институт живописи, скульптуры и архитектуры имени И. Е. Репина. pp. 13–15, 15–18, 18–26. Archived from the original (PDF) on 21 January 2019.
- Гришина, Е. В. (1989). Вступительная статья // Научно-исследовательский музей Академии художеств СССР (in Russian). М.: Изобразительное искусство. pp. 9–23.
- Дульский, П. М. (1921). Н. Фешин. Библиотека иллюстрированных монографий отдела изобразительных искусств Казанского народного комиссариата по просвещению (in Russian). Казань: Казанское отделение государственного издательства. p. 32.
- Казанское окружение Николая Фешина. Автор идеи, редактор-составитель Сарчин Р. Ш. Академия народной энциклопедии (in Russian). Казань: Издательство Академии наук Республики Татарстан. 2019. p. 194. ISBN 978-5-9690-0559-4.
- Ключевская Е. П. и Цой В. А., ed. (1992). Каталог [Николай Иванович Фешин] (in Russian). Казань: Государственный музей изобразительных искусств Республики Татарстан, Татарское газетно-журнальное издательство. pp. 33–51.
- Каталог выставки // Николай Фешин. Каталог выставки произведений Н. И. Фешина в Государственном музее изобразительных искусств Республики Татарстан 22 November 2006 — 20 January 2007, Живопись. Графика. Скульптура. Декоративно-прикладное искусство, Казань: Заман, 2006, pp. 93–106. ISBN 5-89052-036-9
- Капланова, С. Г. (1975). Могильникова Г. (ed.). Творческий путь Н. И. Фешина // Николай Иванович Фешин. Документы, письма, воспоминания о художнике: сб (in Russian). Л.: Художник РСФСР. pp. 7–20.
- Ключевская, Е. П. (1992). Выставки // Каталог произведений Н. И. Фешина до 1923 г. (in Russian). Казань: Государственный музей изобразительных искусств Республики Татарстан, Татарское газетно-журнальное издательство. pp. 25–27.
- Ключевская, Е. П. (1992). Николай Иванович Фешин // Каталог произведений Н. И. Фешина до 1923 г. (in Russian). Казань: Государственный музей изобразительных искусств Республики Татарстан, Татарское газетно-журнальное издательство. pp. 7–16.
- Ключевская, Е. П. (1992). Даты жизни и творчества // Каталог произведений Н. И. Фешина до 1923 г. (in Russian). Казань: Государственный музей изобразительных искусств Республики Татарстан, Татарское газетно-журнальное издательство. pp. 19–24.
- Корнеева, В. М. (2015). Николай Фешин // Мои родные… Н. Н. Белькович. К 120-летию Казанского художественного училища им. Н. И. Фешина (in Russian). Казань: Отечество. pp. 73–121.
- Лисовский, В. Г. (1997). Музей Академии художеств // Академия художеств (in Russian). СПб.: Алмаз. pp. 91–106. ISBN 5-88353-278-0
- Моженок, Т. Э. (2014). Нургалеева Р. М., Хисамова Д. Д., Хабриева О. А. (ed.). Жюль Бастьен-Лепаж (1848—1884) — крестьянский художник // Вторые Казанские искусствоведческие чтения: материалы Международн. науч.-практ. конференции. К 130-летию со дня рождения Н. И. Фешина // Мин-во культуры Республики Татарстан, Государственный музей изобразительных искусств Республики Татарстан (in Russian). Казань: Центр инновационных технологий. pp. 40–47. ISBN 978-5-93962-688-0.
- Целищева Л. Н., Блянова И. М. (1989). Гришина Е. В., Литовченко Е. Н. (ed.). Научно-исследовательский музей Академии художеств СССР (in Russian). М.: Изобразительное искусство. pp. 35–61. ISBN 978-5-8520-0009-5.
- Научно-исследовательский музей Академии художеств СССР // Русская живопись в музеях РСФСР. Художественные сокровища СССР (in Russian). Vol. 11. М., Л.: Изобразительное искусство. 1961.
- Николай Иванович Фешин (Биографическая справка) // Николай Фешин. Каталог выставки (in Russian). М.: Союз художников РСФСР, Министерство культуры РСФСР. 1964. pp. 3–6.
- Петинова, Е. Ф. (2006). Николай Иванович Фешин (1881—1956) // От академизма к модерну. Русская живопись конца XIX — начала XX века (in Russian). СПб.: Искусство-СПб. pp. 491–503. ISBN 5-210-01572-6
- Серяков, Д. Г. (2009). III. 2. «Нон-финито» в портрете // Проблемы «нон-финито» в творчестве Николая Ивановича Фешина: диссертация на соискание учёной степени кандидата искусствоведения (in Russian). М.: Научно-исследовательский институт теории и истории изобразительных искусств Российской академии художеств. pp. 103–118.
- Тулузакова, Г. П. (2008). Академик Николай Иванович Фешин // ДИ. Журнал Московского музея современного искусства (in Russian). The Moscow Museum of Modern Art’s magazine: Журнал. pp. 116–121.
- Тулузакова, Г. П. (2006). Николай Фешин // Николай Фешин. Каталог выставки произведений Н. И. Фешина в Государственном музее изобразительных искусств Республики Татарстан 22 ноября 2006 — 20 января 2007. Живопись. Графика. Скульптура. Декоративно-прикладное искусство (in Russian). Казань: Заман. pp. 8–20. ISBN 5-89052-036-9
- Тулузакова, Г. П. (2007). Николай Фешин: Альбом. Русские художники. XX век (in Russian). СПб.: Золотой век. p. 480. ISBN 978-5-342-00105-2.
- Тулузакова, Г. П. (2012). Николай Фешин в России // Альманах Государственного Русского музея (in Russian). Палаце Едитионс. pp. 9–18. ISBN 978-5-93332-406-5.
- Тулузакова, Г. П. (1998). Эволюция творчества Н. И. Фешина, 1881—1955 гг.: Основные проблемы: диссертация на соискание учёной степени кандидата искусствоведения (in Russian). СПб.: Санкт-Петербургский государственный академический институт живописи, скульптуры и архитектуры имени И. Е. Репина при Российской академии художеств. p. 221.
- Ургалкина, Н. А. (1983). Глава I. Никита Кузьмич Сверчков. Жизнь и творчество (in Russian). Чебоксары: Чувашское книжное издательство. pp. 5–15.
- Цой, В. А. (1992). Николай Иванович Фешин // Каталог произведений Н. И. Фешина до 1923 г. (in Russian). Казань: Государственный музей изобразительных искусств Республики Татарстан, Татарское газетно-журнальное издательство. pp. 5–6.
- Червонная, С. М. (1987). Русская художественная культура в Татарии с начала XVIII до начала XX века // Искусство Татарии (in Russian). М.: Искусство. pp. 181–235.
- Шангина, И. И. (2007). Толока // Русские девушки. Русские традиции (in Russian). СПб.: Азбука-классика. pp. 95–97. ISBN 978-5-352-02194-1.

=== Guides ===
- Галич Л. Ф., Маслова Е. Н., Рохлина С. В., Русакова А. А. (1965). Академия художеств конца XIX — начала XX века // Академия художеств СССР. Научно-исследовательский музей. Русская и советская художественная школа. Путеводитель (in Russian). Л.: Советский художник. pp. 29–34.
