= Slaughterhouse (painting) =

1919 painting by Russian artist Nicolai Fechin

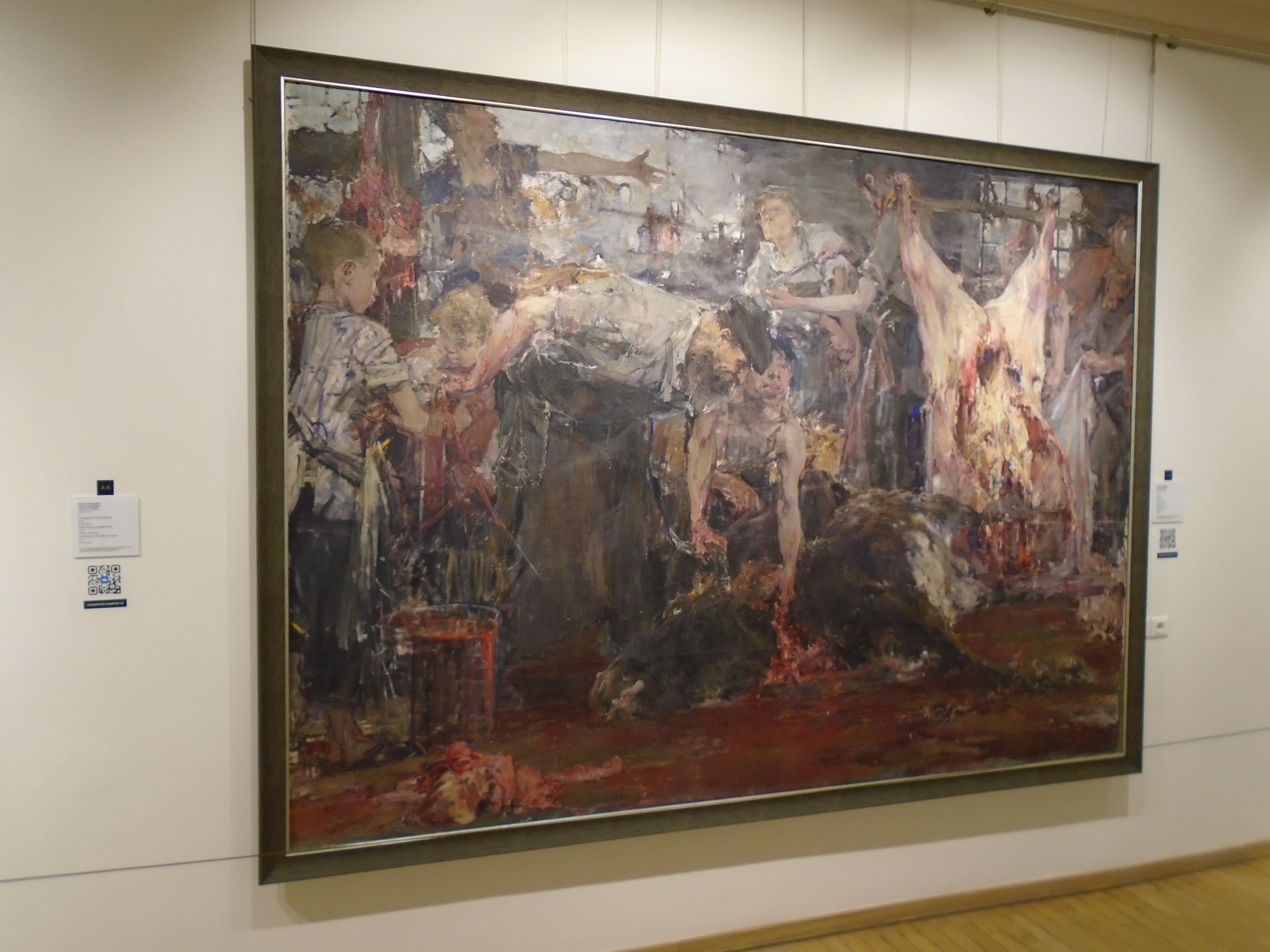
- Artist: Nicolai Fechin
- Year: 1919
- Type: Oil on canvas
- Dimensions: 220 cm × 289 cm (87 in × 114 in)
- Location: State Art Museum of Tatarstan, Kazan

Slaughterhouse (Russian: Бойня) is a painting by the Russian, Soviet and American artist Nicolai Fechin. Art historians believe that the canvas was created in Kazan and that work on it began in 1904, but they differ on when Fechin stopped working (1916, the mid-1910s, 1919, or even the early 1920s). The painting belongs to the collection of the State Art Museum of Tatarstan in Kazan and is exhibited in the permanent exhibition of the Nicolai Fechin Hall of the Khazine National Art Gallery.

Slaughterhouse is a rare genre painting in Fechin's oeuvre. It is one of only four of his large-scale works. Art historians identify him and his father in the figures on the canvas, and the canvas itself is associated not only with the young Fechin's expedition to the Yenisey Range, but also with the bloody events of the First World War or the Russian Civil War, which coincided with his maturity. Researchers are analyzing in detail Fechin's composition, color solution and painting technique.

From the art historians' point of view, the process of Fechin's work on the painting Slaughterhouse was interesting: he created three-dimensional images of animals and butchers as models – sketches for the painting; the few surviving sketches for it are abstract compositions – "a whirlwind of strokes and lines that only remotely resemble real images".

== Representation ==
A bull has been slaughtered, and a group of slaughterhouse workers of various ages are preparing to skin the carcass. According to Russian art historian Galina Tuluzakova, the action of the painting takes place indoors, as the sky is visible only in the upper left part of the painting.

In the foreground, a bull lies on the ground with its throat slit. The cold turquoise color of the eye against the bloody background gives the picture, in the words of the Soviet art historian Peter Dulsky, "a sharp eeriness". Two butchers bend over the bull. Their movements are confident and unhurried. In the background, a slaughterhouse worker drags another stubborn animal with a rope. Further to the right, a worker is skinning a hanging carcass. To the left of the carcass, behind it, is a worker dressed in a butcher's uniform with an apron. This attire does not conform to Jewish ritual (which, according to Peter Dulsky, is what Fechin chose to depict). This worker carefully wipes the blade of his knife. At the left edge of the foreground are the journeyman boys (one with his back to the viewer, the other full-face). They are playing with a bull's bladder (probably blowing it up) without paying attention to what is happening.

The upper part of the painting depicts hot air vapors through which bright patches of sky can be seen. In the same plan, a worker is holding out his hand and shouting, and another is dragging a bull to slaughter. Tuluzakova believed that Fechin gave this figure features of his own appearance. The butcher standing next to him holds a knife at the height of his chest, which the researcher took as a symbol.

== History of the painting ==
=== Place in Fechin's œuvre ===
The Russian art historian Galina Tuluzakova tried to determine the place of the painting Slaughterhouse in Fechin's creative development. His first stage (from Homeless Man to Full Victory and Exit from the Factory) – the assimilation of Fechin's subjects and the stylistics of the Peredvizhniki; the mature period of his work (from Bearing Away the Bride to Slaughterhouse), "due to external circumstances" did not continue, demonstrates the emotional intensity of canvases, "naked, nervous, on the verge of hysterical outbreak of feelings". In her opinion, the "climax" of this stage was the painting Pouring. In this second creative stage, Fechin intensified the compositional dynamics by "external movement of the figures" and "formal methods". His most "expressionist" painting in terms of form and content is Slaughterhouse, which "eliminates the contradiction between the plot and its interpretation, where the feeling of life 'as it is' is full of tragedy and tears".

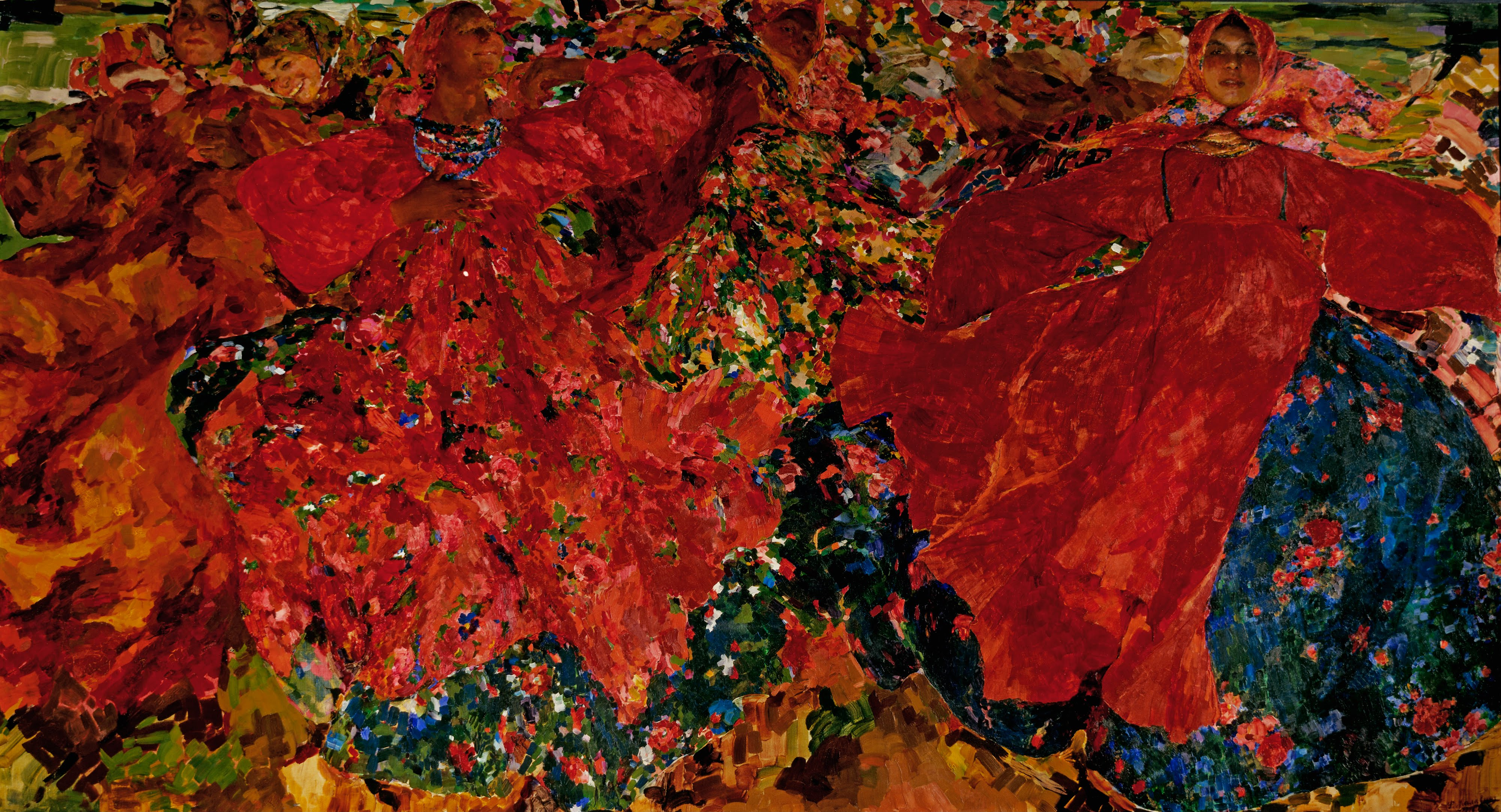
Filipp Malyavin, Whirlwind, 1906

Tuluzakova considered the domestic genre to be the key genre of this stage of Fechin's development. In her opinion, his goal was not visible nature, but a way of expressing his attitude to the world, "the understanding of deep, essential processes of being". The domestic genre provided an opportunity to "sharpen the images", "use the techniques of the grotesque" at the sensitive and intuitive levels. Tuluzakova concluded that exaggeration and the grotesque "seem closer to a sober view of the reality of life than to a photographically accurate fixation of the moment". (Note: By “photographically accurate capture of the moment” Tuluzakova in this case understood the portrait genre.) Rejecting a one-dimensional approach that combined the beautiful and the ugly, Fechin asserted the equality of the content and formal aspects of works. He drew from tradition, but freely interpreted composition and colorism, treating the painting as a "decorative whole". According to Tuluzakova, this led to the "fusion of plans" in this creative period, "the rejection of aerial perspective, the combination of silhouette and volumetric principles in the construction of form, the search for a variety of possibilities in working with texture and color, experimentation with purely technical methods", each fragment of the composition of the picture was understood by the artist as a "complete aesthetic whole". She attributed Fechin's works of this period to the "expressive-grotesque line" in the history of Russian art of the early 20th century, which also included paintings by Filip Malyavin, Boris Grigoriev, and Pavel Filonov. In her opinion, Fechin was less concerned with social problems than with "the element of national character". She characterized his genre compositions as "folk and everyday" (as opposed to "social and popular").

Dmitry Seryakov, a Russian researcher of Fechin's work, drew attention in his doctoral dissertation to the fact that Fechin, despite all his artistic activity, created only four major genre works, two of them in his student days (Bearing Away the Bride and Kapustnitsa), one not completed (Pouring), and only Slaughterhouse created in the period of maturity. In his opinion, he "clearly felt the artistic principles outlined earlier and found their logical development in Slaughterhouse", but "in a slightly different way than in his previous paintings". He also emphasized in this canvas "the expressiveness, the expansive writing, the revealing freedom and even a certain spontaneity of the creative act in the manner of painting, the ultimate generalization of details".

=== Fechin's work ===
In 1920, Fechin presented the unfinished canvas Slaughterhouse for the first time at the State Exhibition of Paintings in Kazan. It made a strong impression on the audience with its plot. The art historian and publisher Peter Dulsky, who was acquainted with Fechin at the Kazan Art School, wrote in an essay on Fechin's life and work that the canvas was conceived as long before as 1904, when he made a trip to the South Yenisey Range (Dmitry Seriakov assumed that the source of Dulsky's knowledge about the creation of the picture could be a story of Fechin himself). At that time, Fechin was part of an expedition to explore this region, led by the mining engineer Nicolai Izhitsky. Fechin later recalled that it was Izhitsky, who was "fascinated" by Siberia, who took the initiative for the trip. Izhitsky persuaded him to join the expedition. "These days, spent in the untouched beauty of Siberia, remained one of the most memorable and happiest in my life", recalled Fechin years later. Ekaterina Kliuchevskaya, a student of art history, wrote that the "binding" of genre painting to a specific geographical point was characteristic of Fechin's work. As an example she cited the painting Bearing Away the Bride, where the action takes place in the village of Morki Tsarevokokokshaisky uyezd of Kazan province, and other works of his.

In the taiga, Fechin saw several times how local people slaughtered cattle. The cattle were driven to special fenced meadows surrounded by ravines. The slaughter was done in the open. The animal was caught with a harness, then tied by the horns with a rope and dragged to a place where waiting workers stunned it, knifed it and made it bleed. The animals roared and struggled, creating a gruesome image that was enhanced by the considerable amount of blood under the feet of the slaughterhouse workers. Dulsky believed that Fechin was impressed by the "coloristic data of the peculiarities of this motif" and the "mental acuity" of the scene he had seen, "which were embedded in the artist's memory". Dulsky wrote that Fechin was most influenced by the large amount of blood and its brightness due to its exposure to " the oxygen of the air. He wanted to create a scene such that the bright effects of the spilling blood would be the focus of the viewer's attention. That is why, according to Dulsky, he chose as his subject the Jewish method of slaughtering cattle, in which the animal, lying on the ground with its hooves tied together, has its throat cut with a knife.

According to Dulsky, Fechin began to work on the subject of the massacre in 1905, but limited himself to sketches for his future painting. The artist Alexander Lyubimov, who studied at the Kazan Art School from 1914 to 1918 and was in close contact with Fechin at that time, wrote in his Memories that in 1915–1916 he exhibited in the Kazan Museum sketches of boys' heads for the painting Slaughterhouse. According to him, they were made in the technique of "wood carving". In the Kazan period, Fechin often used sculptural models as studies for pictorial compositions. For example, Galina Tuluzakova mentioned volumetric figures of bulls for Slaughterhouse (1910s). (Note: The place is unknown, only a photographic reproduction of it has survived – NA GMII RT, f. 4, OP. 1, ed. xr. 2 / 671).)

The Russian Soviet "new peasant poet" and artist, the last chairman of the Peredvizhniki Society and the first chairman of the Association of Artists of Revolutionary Russia, Pavel Radimov, recalled that in the early years of his acquaintance with Fechin, the latter showed him a set of sketches of twelve of his works. Among them was Slaughterhouse. Radimov wrote that Fechin later created his canvases on the basis of these sketches. Tuluzakova in her dissertation mentioned the drawing Boy (sketch for Slaughterhouse), created by Fechin in 1912, presumably with charcoal on paper, but noted that its location was unknown until 1998. This drawing was published in a biographical sketch by Peter Dulsky. (Note: Tuluzakova mistakenly wrote that this reproduction is in Dulsky's book between pages 20 and 21, in fact, in this place there is a reproduction of the painting Slaughterhouse itself.)

According to Dulsky, Fechin began to work on the painting itself only in 1912 and continued until 1916. In a letter to Valery Loboykov dated February 16, 1916, which contains his autobiography for his upcoming candidacy for Academician of the Imperial Academy of Arts, Fechin wrote that he was working on two large canvases. Art historians believe that these canvases were Pouring and Slaughterhouse.

Dulsky described the canvas as "a rather large canvas 286 × 205 centimeters depicting up to 8 figures, (Note: Dulsky is mistaken in his description of the dimensions of the cloth.) apparently in a small room of a Jewish butcher's shop (?)". Researchers of the late 20th and early 21st century generally accepted the version of the author of the first scientific essay on the work of Fechin. Galina Tuluzakova, however, in her doctoral thesis wrote that Fechin continued the work on this canvas in the early 1920s – until his departure to the United States. On the contrary, another Russian art historian, Dmitry Seriakov, wrote in his dissertation that since the mid-1910s "the artist's search for action in the field of thematic painting went in a new direction. The artist began to show interest in depicting the everyday life of people, their work, everyday life, which, according to Seryakov, can be clearly seen in his works In the Cooper's Workshop (1914, RT State Museum of Fine Arts), In the Forge (1920s, RT State Museum of Fine Arts). After the October Revolution, from Seryakov's point of view, Fechin had no opportunity to work on large genre paintings, and a number of sketches (for example, Hunger and Uprising at the Back of Kolchak (1921 and 1923 respectively, both at the State Museum of Fine Arts) indicate his interest in acute social and topical themes.

== Part of the State Art Museum of Tatarstan's collection ==
Having left his homeland, Fechin left Slaughterhouse in the Central Museum of the Tatar ASSR in 1923, (Note: The circumstances and reasons for Fechin's emigration to the United States are described in the articles by Dr. Ramil Sarchin and Yulia Anshakova, as well as in the popular essay My relatives... N. N. Belkovich, authored by Vera Korneeva, a relative of the artist's wife.) and gave the sketches and designs for it to his wife's relatives – the Belkovichs. Later, in 1944, it was transferred to the collection of the State Museum of the Tatar ASSR, which was formed on its basis. Nowadays, the painting forms part of the collection of the State Art Museum of Tatarstan, which was founded in 1958 on the basis of the picture gallery of the State Museum of the Tatar ASSR and is exhibited in the hall of Nicolai Fechin in the National Art Gallery Khazine (a branch of this museum in the Kazan Kremlin). It came there in 1962. Its inventory number in the collection is Zh-634.

Slaughterhouse is an oil painting on canvas, 220 × 289 cm. The museum catalog dates the painting to 1919. It was presented several times at large Russian and All-Union exhibitions. So it was shown at the 1st State Exhibition of Paintings in Kazan in 1920, at the exhibition of the Association of Artists of Revolutionary Russia in Moscow in 1926, at the exhibition Nicolai Fechin and his Time in Kazan in 1981, there at the exhibition The Art of Tatarstan in the 1920s – 1930s in 1990 and at the exhibition of works of N. I. Fechin in the State Museum of Fine Arts. Fechin in the State Art Museum of Tatarstan in November 2006 – January 2007.

Dmitry Seryakov mentioned in his doctoral thesis that the State Art Museum of Tatarstan has sketches for Slaughterhouse made in the 1910s. They are executed with gouache in combination with watercolor in a free way, close to abstract compositions. The "outlines of forms" here are almost indistinguishable. The sketches are "a whirlwind of strokes and lines that only vaguely resemble real paintings. According to Seryakov, they were only intended to determine the general composition of the work, so Fechin did not bother to detail the images, although he himself undoubtedly guessed at concrete forms behind the abstract dots of the sketches. The sketches occupy only a part of a sheet of paper and are inscribed in "rectangular frames that define the boundaries of the picture". Seryakov also suggested that the margins around the image were sometimes used by the author as an improvised palette, trying out colors on them before applying a stroke. In some of the sketches, however, Fechin enclosed the image in a wide frame, which he dashed with black paint. According to Seriakov, he did this to test how the picture would look in a dark environment. Such a frame adds tension and contrast to the sketch.

External images
- | Sketch 1, 1910s
- | Sketch 2, 1910s

In her 2007 book about Fechin, Galina Tuluzakova mentions the following surviving preparatory sketches for the canvas Slaughterhouse and reproduces them:

- Sketch for the painting Slaughterhouse, 1910s (paper, watercolor, gouache, graphic pencil, size 23.5 × 33.2 cm). It is in the State Art Museum of Tatarstan collection. It came to the museum in 1978 from the private collection of N.P. Grechkin in Kazan. Before Grechkin it was in the private collection of S. P. Belkovich, also in Kazan. The inventory number of the sketch in the museum's collection is G-18551.
- Sketch for the painting Slaughterhouse, 1910s (paper, watercolor, gouache, graphic pencil, size 22.7 × 28.9 cm). It is also in the State Art Museum of Tatarstan collection. The sketch came to the museum in 1963 as a gift from O. P. Barashova, whose private collection was in Astrakhan. The inventory number of the sketch in the museum's collection is G-911.

Both sketches were exhibited at the exhibition dedicated to the 125th anniversary of Fechin's birth, held from November 2006 to January 2007 in the State Art Museum of Tatarstan.

- Sketch for the painting Slaughterhouse, 1919 (canvas, oil, size: 43 × 56 cm). It belongs to the collection of the A.V. Grigoriev Art and History Museum in Kozmodemyansk. Marina Yashina, the head of the department of organizational and design activities of the Kozmodemyansk Cultural and Historical Museum Complex, puts this sketch among the first works of Fechin, which Alexander Grigoryev himself bought for the museum, either directly from Fechin himself or through the mediation of Radimov in Kazan in June 1920. (Note: The art historian Lyudmila Kuvshinskaya writes dates this not June but July 6.) According to the preliminary report, a total of 230 thousand rubles was spent on the purchase of seven works by Fechin, including this sketch. All seven were exhibited at the First Kozmodemyansk Exhibition of Paintings, Sketches, Drawings, etc., held on the occasion of the 3rd anniversary of the October Revolution. This exhibition took place from November 7 to December 7, 1920.

Seryakov wrote that Fechin's earlier sketches for the painting Kapustnica (1909, State Museum of Fine Arts), made in the same gouache, differ from Slaughterhouse by much more elaborate detail. Fechin paid special attention to the elaboration of the figures of the main characters.

== Art critics' and viewers' reviews ==
=== Contemporaries and Soviet art historians on the painting ===
The artist Deborah Ryazanskaya, who studied in from 1918 to 1920 in the painting studio of Nadezhda Sapozhnikova, where Fechin was giving classes, saw the painting Slaughterhouse and talked about her impressions of it. According to her, Fechin gave his students the task of writing a composition on the theme Ulysses' return to Penelope. Such an assignment was rare at that time. In the studio where the students were working, two large works by Fechin, Slaughterhouse and Blanching, were hanging on the wall. When Fechin left, the students turned the paintings away from the wall and studied them. According to Deborah Ryazanskaya, both paintings captivated the studio students. In addition to the composition, they also scrutinized Fechin's technique in these paintings.

Peter Dulsky paid great attention to Slaughterhouse, he described in detail the history of its creation and the image on it. He gave a contradictory evaluation of this painting. He wrote:

As for the composition and expression of the painting, it is quite curious, dramatized notes sound clearly in the painting, which is all soaked with the smell of blood, giving it some nightmarish, cruel character. All these dark moments repulsive side of cutting animals in the painting N. Fechin successfully transferred, the effects of gelled, spilled blood is also juicy captured by the artist, but it must be confessed that the picture of its screaming motif rather irritates the viewer, who, familiarized with it, takes away with him a feeling of bitterness and disgust, completely forgetting the technique and talented skill of the artist, inspired by such a grim bloody plot.

Soviet art historian S. G. Kaplanova considered Slaughterhouse to be the most complete and significant of Fechin's major works. She emphasized that the canvas depicts hard work and that Fechin shows the viewer "a piece of life exactly as it opened before him, without softening or concealing anything. Kaplanova noted that the painting combines tension and serenity. In her opinion, this atmosphere is created by the colors used: the black skin of the bull, the gray shirts of the slaughterhouse workers, the yellowish-red of the fresh carcass, and the earthen floor covered with blood. Such a range of colors creates a special "fusion, full of drama and inner strength".

=== Contemporary Russian art historians on the painting ===
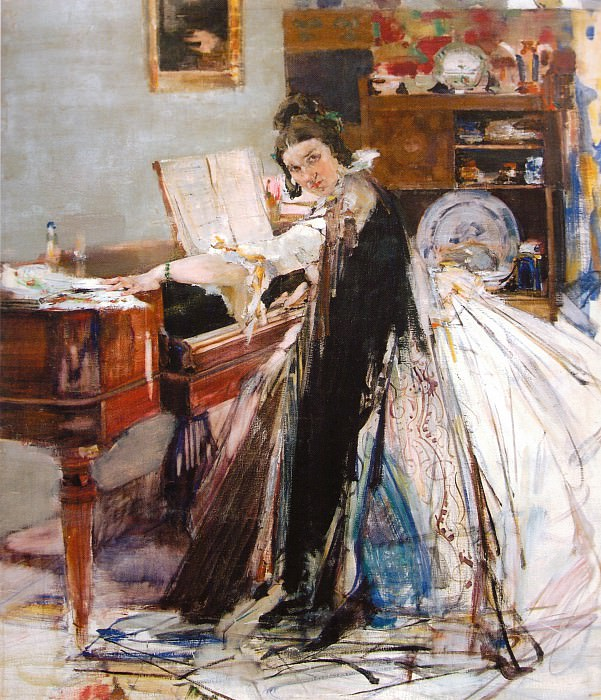
Nicolai Fechin. Portrait of N. M. Sapozhnikova (at the piano), 1916

Tuluzakova noted that "the contrast of the refinement of formal techniques and the anti-aestheticism of the subject of the picture", which always attracted Fechin, finds its "most open expression" in the painting Slaughterhouse. In her opinion, he portrayed people for whom murder has become a regular occupation. She believes that Fechin showed two poles – life and death. The symbol of the latter is a fresh corpse, that of the former is children. These two poles are symmetrical in relation to the central axis of the canvas and, in her opinion, provide the key to understanding Fechin's intention. Slaughterhouse appears on the canvas as a model of life, including tragedy and ordinariness, murder and play, indifference and protest.

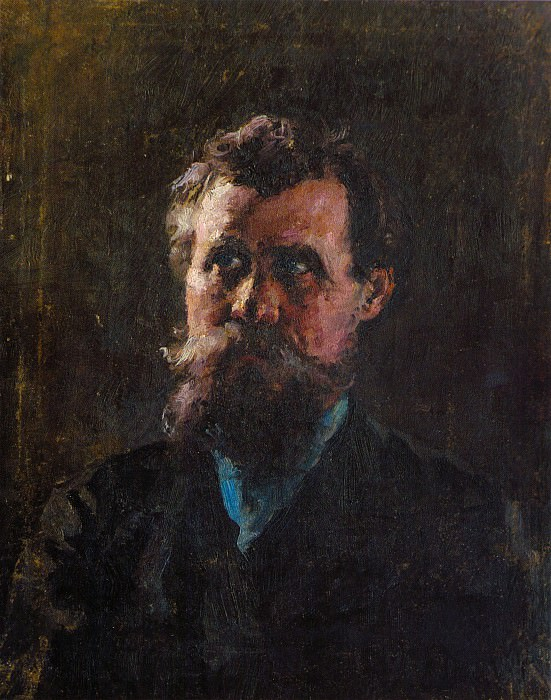
Nicolai Fechin. Portrait of Father I. A. Fechin, 1890s

According to Tuluzakova, the composition of the painting is based on contrasts and oppositions. The dark, heavy lower part of the painting contrasts with the light, brighter upper part. The left part with children contrasts with the right part (a bloody corpse). She noticed the combination of interior (closed) and exterior (open, free) space in Slaughterhouse. According to her, the rhythm of vertical and horizontal lines determines the internal structure of the work. The verticals are formed by the figures of children, a worker wiping a knife, a man in the background and the beams next to him, the legs of the bent man in the background, the hands of the crouching worker, and another figure skinning a carcass. For the horizontals, she referred to the floor, the lying carcass, the bent worker, the hands of the butcher and the worker in the far background, the hanging pole on which the carcass being processed is suspended, and the windowpane. She compared the relationship of these horizontal and vertical lines to the paintings of Piet Mondrian. Tuluzakova found the same Mondrian scheme with a rigid intersection of vertical and horizontal lines in Portrait of N. M. Sapozhnikova at the Piano, which she considered a genre painting rather than a portrait.

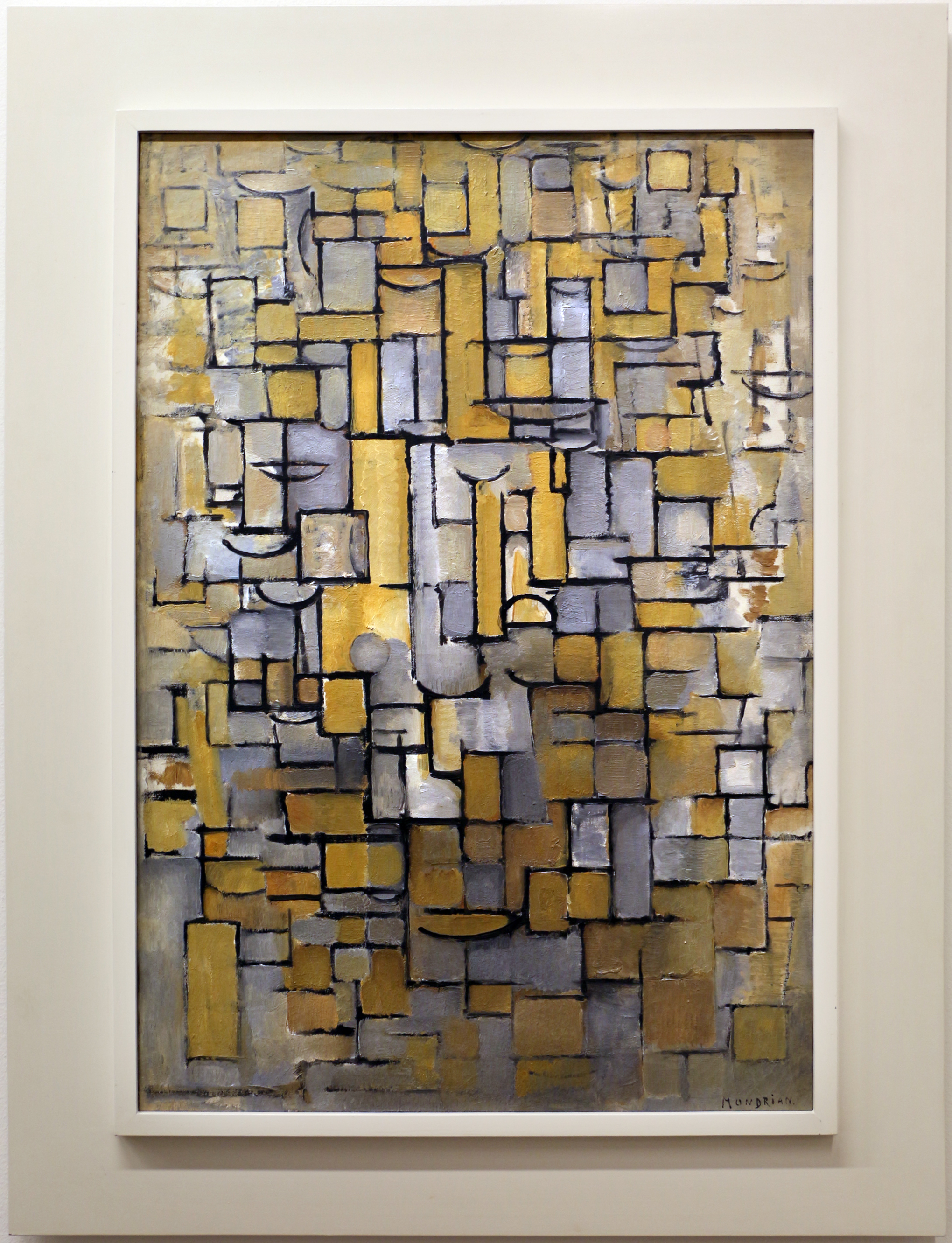
Piet Mondrian. Composition XIV, 1913

The face of the most distant figure in the center of the painting, which Tuluzakova perceived as a self-portrait, is, in her opinion, the top of an imaginary pyramid. The "slight break" between the outstretched hand and the counter-impulsive movement of this figure is, in her view, "a way out of the closed, stuffy space. The main action unfolds closer to the viewer. Its main elements are the figure of a leaning man close to the viewer, modeled after the artist's father, (Note: Ivan Alexandrovich Fechin (?–1919) was the owner of a carpenter's workshop and an expert in gilding iconostases, directed an artel working in Kazan province. He used to encourage his son's interest in painting, and dreamt of his career as an icon painter. He went bankrupt, lived in poverty, and died of typhus. Up to ten portraits of Ivan Fechin made by his son are known.) as well as the carcass of a slaughtered bull lying on the floor and the hanging carcass from which the worker is skinning. She noted the "delicacy of the elaboration of red, pink, yellow and white, with variations of warm and cold" of his image and that the carcass is "crucified" on a crossbar (an analogy to a well-known Christian subject). In the image of the bull lying on the ground, she noted the "free, almost careless brushstroke" applied to the painting eye of the lying bull, conveying the agony of death, and the use of shades of warm brown and cold white-gray colors to depict the softness, amorphousness of the carcass from which life is draining away.

Tuluzakova noted the contrast of red (which turns pink) and black (which fades to gray and white) in the fragment of the painting with the dead body. The absence of yellow here, she argued, leads the viewer to feel the instability and morbidity of the situation depicted. At the same time, she wrote, the canvas lacks Fechin's "opposition between the subject of the picture and its interpretation" characteristic of Fechin's festive compositions (Pouring, Bearing Away the Bride, and others). She wrote that not only are the images of the painting endowed with heightened expression, but Fechin fixes in them "his attitude to life as a tragedy, where cruelty and despair, rudeness and callousness constitute its meaning". She listed the emotions that, in her opinion, are endowed with the characters of the canvas: fear, collapse, tears, nervous excitement.

Tuluzakova noted that despite the bleakness of the scene depicted on the painting, Fechin managed to avoid realism. His painterly skill (nuances of color relations, "living, trembling texture", use of both paste and "fused, smooth painting") allows the viewer to abstract from the subject. From her point of view, in Slaughterhouse Fechin balances on the edge: the tragic action of the scene "should not cause disgust" and the "aesthetics of form" should not distract from the bloody nature of the scene.

Dmitry Seryakov noted that the coloration of the painting Slaughterhouse "is based on a dramatic combination of white, gray, black colors with blood-red, pink shades. Somewhere in the dense dark strokes, Fechin added a "bright ultramarine" that is imperceptible to the viewer at a considerable distance, but makes the nearby colors "look more intense". He emphasized that what shocks the viewer, the figures on the canvas, does not evoke any emotion at all. This is their everyday life. According to Seriakov, Fechin was not trying to epathetize the viewer, he was "contrasting the virtues of painting with the deliberately unaesthetic nature of the subject" and conducting a kind of experiment to see if it was possible to introduce "repulsive spectacle" into the framework of aesthetics. Seryakov wrote that Fechin "does not like the physiological details of what is happening" (Note: Art historian Elena Petinova wrote of the “magnificent in painting and physiologically repulsive painting Slaughterhouse".) and tries to convey primarily a tense coloristic atmosphere, so that Fechin is "extremely impartial in his painting". In Seryakov's opinion, this impartiality gives a special depth to the drama of the massacre scene he depicts.

The difference between Slaughterhouse and other genre paintings by Fechin, Dmitry Seryakov saw in the refusal to "build a picture on the basis of expressive types". The characters of the scene depicted on the canvas "do not stand out with a bright individuality. On the contrary, they have a generalized and typical character. The action is conveyed not so much by the facial expressions and gestures of the characters, but rather by the arrangement of color and tonal spots and "dynamics of the stroke", that is, by the "technique of painting" – by contrasting color combinations. Fechin's brushstrokes are intense. In some fragments of the canvas Fechin "sculpts volumes", in others – "linearly emphasizes the drawing, clarifies the silhouette", "the trace of the brush, often jerky, moving in its dynamics and sometimes deliberately chaotic, slides on the underlying layers, exposing the underpainting". The forms of the objects themselves are represented on the canvas in a generalized way, with a number of details that Fechin only hints at, there is a great deal of conventionality. Seryakov wrote that some objects can only be guessed at, and only from a great distance. When the viewer examines the canvas from a close distance, he sees "unplotted color-tone masses".

At the end of his review of Slaughterhouse, Seryakov wrote (confessing that he was exaggerating somewhat) that he had the impression that "the preparatory sketch for the painting has been enlarged to the scale of a large-format canvas, while retaining the intensity of elaboration and detail". In his opinion, this approach is close to the technique of non-finito, but it has peculiarities: the contrast between the main (which Fechin works out in detail in non-finito) and the secondary (which remains poorly worked out), which is characteristic of the deliberate incompleteness of Slaughterhouse, is "strongly smoothed out". This, according to him, relates it to the sketch, where Fechin reflects the general coloristic and emotional state of the subject (nuances and drawing are relegated to the background).

Sergei Voronkov has argued that Slaughterhouse has features in common with Fechin's other three major genre paintings:

- A "large, dominant figure" always placed on the left side,
- The horizon line is placed at about one third of the height of the painting, i.e. at the eye level of the main characters,
- There are "linear and color rhythmic repetitions".

Voronkov noted that Fechin shows only a part of the slaughterhouse, giving the viewer a sense of confinement. By bringing the action as close to the viewer as possible, he emphasizes the physiological nature of what is happening on the canvas. The impact of the picture is intensified by contrasts: a puddle of blood from a slaughtered bull and the calm faces of the workers, for whom it is a familiar work, the scene of skinning on the right and two boys inflating the bull's bladder on the left. In Voronkov's opinion, this removes the picture's internal tension. He believed that the coloring of Slaughterhouse is based on the ratio of three colors: black, red and white; and that Fechin applied the color to the canvas using both a brush and a painting knife, possibly mixing the colors "directly on the canvas, achieving strength, purity and exuberance of color". Voronkov drew a correlation between Fechin's painting and the much later Bull Carcasses by Chaïm Soutine, which used this particular technique. He believed that the painting could be a reflection of, and a response to, the bloody events of the Russian Civil War. He also suggested that the "incompleteness" of Slaughterhouse was in keeping with Fechin's intentions: he "deliberately left the painting at this stage in order not to lose something important, something found". Aida Almazova, on the other hand, wrote in the book Artistic Culture of Tatarstan in the Context of Social Processes and Spiritual Traditions: Essays, that Slaughterhouse was created by Fechin as early as 1914.

== Bibliography ==
=== Sources ===
- Lyubimov, А. А. (1975). Воспоминания // Николай Иванович Фешин. Документы, письма, воспоминания о художнике: сб [Memories // Nicolai Ivanovich Fechin. Documents, letters, memories of the artist: collection] (in Russian). Л.: Художник РСФСР. pp. 109–119.
- Radimov, P. A. (1975). Воспоминания // Николай Иванович Фешин. Документы, письма, воспоминания о художнике: сб [Memories // Nicolai Ivanovich Fechin. Documents, letters, memories of the artist: collection] (in Russian). Л.: Художник РСФСР. pp. 120–122.
- Ryazanskaya, D. I. (1975). Воспоминания // Николай Иванович Фешин. Документы, письма, воспоминания о художнике: сб [Memories // Nicolai Ivanovich Fechin. Documents, letters, memories of the artist: collection] (in Russian). Л.: Художник РСФСР. pp. 134–140.
- Fechin, N. I. (1975). Письмо В. П. Лобойкову // Николай Иванович Фешин. Документы, письма, воспоминания о художнике: сб [Letter to V. P. Loboykov // Nicolai Ivanovich Fechin. Documents, letters, memories of the artist: collection] (in Russian). Л.: Художник РСФСР. pp. 134–140.

=== Researches and non-fiction ===
- Almazova, A. A. (2013). Изобразительное искусство в XX столетии // Художественная культура Татарстана в контексте социальных процессов и духовных традиций: очерки [Fine Arts in the 20th Century // Artistic Culture of Tatarstan in the Context of Social Processes and Spiritual Traditions: Essays] (in Russian). Казань: Казанский университет. pp. 209–233.
- Anshakova, Yu. Yu. (2017). Николай Фешин и Американская администрация помощи. Материалы к биографии художника [Nicolai Fechin and the American Relief Administration. Materials for the artist's biography] (in Russian). Vol. 19. Журнал: Известия Самарского научного центра Российской академии наук. pp. 287–293. ISSN 1990-5378.
- Voronkov, S. N. (1999). Жанровые композиции // К вопросу о творчестве Николая Фешина [Genre compositions // To the question of Nicolai Fechin's work] (PDF) (in Russian). СПб.: Санкт-Петербургский Академический институт живописи, скульптуры и архитектуры имени И. Е. Репина. pp. 18–26.
- Dulsky, P. M. (1921). Н. Фешин [N. Fechin]. Библиотека иллюстрированных монографий отдела изобразительных искусств Казанского народного комиссариата по просвещению (in Russian). Казань: Казанское отделение государственного издательства. p. 32.
- Казанское окружение Николая Фешина. Автор идеи, редактор-составитель Сарчин Р. Ш. [Nicolai Fechin's Kazan Environment. Author of the idea, editor-composer Sarchin R. Sh.]. Академия народной энциклопедии (in Russian). Казань: Издательство Академии наук Республики Татарстан. 2019. p. 194. ISBN 978-5-9690-0559-4.
- Каталог [Николай Иванович Фешин]. Сост. Ключевская Е. П. и Цой В. А. // Каталог произведений Н. И. Фешина до 1923 г. [Catalog [Nicolai Ivanovich Fechin]. Compiled by. Kliuchevskaya E. P. and Tsoi V. A. // Catalog of works by N. I. Fechin until 1923] (in Russian). Казань: Государственный музей изобразительных искусств Республики Татарстан, Татарское газетно-журнальное издательство. 1992. pp. 33–51.
- Николай Фешин. Каталог выставки произведений Н. И. Фешина в Государственном музее изобразительных искусств Республики Татарстан 22 ноября 2006 – 20 января 2007. Живопись. Графика. Скульптура. Декоративно-прикладное искусство [Nicolai Fechin. Catalog of the exhibition of works by N. I. Fechin in the State Museum of Fine Arts of the Republic of Tatarstan November 22, 2006 – January 20, 2007. Painting. Graphics. Sculpture. Decorative and applied art.] (in Russian). Казань: Заман. 2006. pp. 93–106. ISBN 5-89052-036-9.
- Kaplanova, S. G. (1975). Творческий путь Н. И. Фешина // Николай Иванович Фешин. Документы, письма, воспоминания о художнике: сб [Creative path of N. I. Fechin // Nicolai Ivanovich Fechin. Documents, letters, memoirs about the artist: collection] (in Russian). Л.: Художник РСФСР. pp. 7–20.
- Klyuchevskaya, E. P. (1992). [Николай Иванович Фешин] // Каталог произведений Н. И. Фешина до 1923 г. [[Nicolai Ivanovich Fechin] // Catalog of works by N. I. Fechin until 1923.] (in Russian). Казань: Государственный музей изобразительных искусств Республики Татарстан, Татарское газетно-журнальное издательство. pp. 7–16.
- Korneeva, V. M. (2015). Николай Фешин // Мои родные… Н. Н. Белькович. К 120-летию Казанского художественного училища им. Н. И. Фешина [Nicolai Fechin // My relatives... N. N. Belkovich. To the 120th anniversary of the Kazan Art School named after N. I. Fechin] (in Russian). Казань: Отечество. pp. 73–121.
- Kuvshinskaya, L. A. (2014). Козьмодемьянский эпистолярный message. А. Н. И. Фешин и А. В. Григорьева [Kozmodemyansk epistolary message. A. N. I. Fechin and A. V. Grigorieva] (in Russian). pp. 104–111. ISBN 978-5-93962-688-0.
- Petinova, E. F. (2006). Николай Иванович Фешин (1881–1956) // От академизма к модерну. Русская живопись конца XIX – начала XX века [Nicolai Ivanovich Fechin (1881–1956) // From Academism to Art Nouveau. Russian painting of the late XIX – early XX century] (in Russian). СПб.: Искусство-СПб. pp. 491–503. ISBN 5-210-01572-6.
- Sarchin, R. Sh. (2018). Голодал ли Фешин? [Was Fechin starving?] (PDF) (in Russian). Казань: Аргамак. pp. 88–103.
- Seryakov, D. G. (2009). III. 2. «Нон-финито» в портрете // Проблемы «нон-финито» в творчестве Николая Ивановича Фешина: диссертация на соискание учёной степени кандидата искусствоведения [III. 2. “Non-finito” in the portrait // Problems of ‘non-finito’ in the work of Nicolai Ivanovich Fechin: thesis for the degree of Candidate of Art History] (in Russian). М.: НИИ теории и истории изобразительных искусств Российской академии художеств. pp. 103–118.
- Tuluzakova, G. P. (2008). Академик Николай Иванович Фешин // ДИ. Журнал Московского музея современного искусства [Academician Nicolai Ivanovich Fechin // DI. Journal of the Moscow Museum of Modern Art] (in Russian). The Moscow Museum of Modern Art’s magazine: Журнал. pp. 116–121.
- Tuluzakova, G. P. (2006). Николай Фешин // Николай Фешин. Каталог выставки произведений Н. И. Фешина в Государственном музее изобразительных искусств Республики Татарстан 22 ноября 2006 – 20 января 2007. Живопись. Графика. Скульптура. Декоративно-прикладное искусство [Nicolai Fechin // Nicolai Fechin. Catalog of the exhibition of works by N. I. Fechin in the State Museum of Fine Arts of the Republic of Tatarstan November 22, 2006 – January 20, 2007. Painting. Graphics. Sculpture. Decorative and applied art] (in Russian). Казань: Заман. pp. 8–20. ISBN 5-89052-036-9.
- Tuluzakova, G. P. (2007). Николай Фешин: Альбом [Nicolai Fechin: Album]. Русские художники. XX век (in Russian). СПб.: Золотой век. p. 480. ISBN 978-5-342-00105-2.
- Tuluzakova, G. P. (1998). Эволюция творчества Н. И. Фешина, 1881–1955 гг.: Основные проблемы: диссертация на соискание учёной степени кандидата искусствоведения [The Evolution of N. I. Fechin's Art, 1881–1955: Main Problems: Thesis for the degree of Candidate of Art History] (in Russian). СПб.: Санкт-Петербургский государственный академический институт живописи, скульптуры и архитектуры имени И. Е. Репина при Российской академии художеств. p. 221.
- Yashina, M. G. (2014). Эскизы к картине Н. И. Фешина «Черемисская свадьба» из коллекции Козьмодемьянского художественного музея имени А. В. Григорьева [Sketches for the painting Bearing Away the Bride by N. I. Fechin from the collection of the A. V. Grigoryev Kozmodemyansk Art Museum] (in Russian). pp. 18–23. ISBN 978-5-93962-688-0.
