= Nikolai Klyuev =

Russian poet (1884–1937)

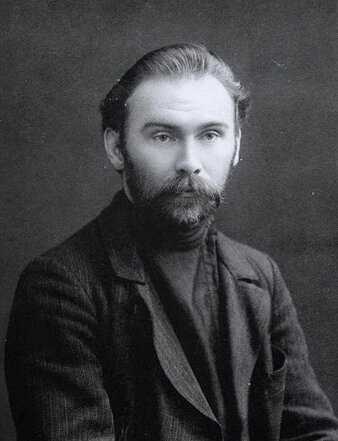
- Born: 22 October 1884; Koshtugi, Russian Empire
- Died: 23/25 October 1937 (aged 53); Tomsk, RSFSR, Soviet Union
- Occupation: Poet
- Writing career
- Years active: 1905–1933
- Literary movement: New peasant poets

Nikolai Alekseevich Klyuev (Russian: Николай Алексеевич Клюев, IPA: [nʲɪkɐˈlaj ɐlʲɪˈksʲejɪvʲɪtɕ ˈklʲʉjɪf]; 22 October 1884 – 23/25 October 1937) was a notable Russian poet. He was influenced by the symbolist movement, intense nationalism, and a love of Russian folklore.

Born in the village of Koshtugi in Olonets Governorate (now Vologda Oblast) near the town of Vytegra, Kluyev rose to prominence in the early twentieth century as the leader of the so-called "peasant poets". Kluyev was a close friend and mentor of Sergei Yesenin. Arrested in 1933 for contradicting Soviet ideology, he was shot in 1937 and rehabilitated posthumously in 1957.

== Homosexuality ==
Klyuev was homosexual and had love affairs in Vytegra in the immediate post-revolutionary years, before he settled in Saint Petersburg in the 1920s. Nevertheless, by the 1920s the evidence of active homosexual relationships become more evident in the account of his life, as well as his poetry. In 1928, he met his great love, Anatoly Kravchenko, a young artist. The two lived as companions in Leningrad until Kravchenko's marriage in 1933, which came as a blow to Klyuev.

Homo-eroticism can be found in Klyuev's poetry from as early as the late 1910s. By the 1930s a more romanticized form of homosexual love is found addressed in the poems to Kravchenko.

However, documentary evidence remains scarce; as some suggest, one of the reasons is that scholars in Russia working on archival material have tended to treat issues of sexuality with some caution; and homosexuality remains a taboo subject for Russian readers and students.

== Religious views ==
Kluyev, whose work is thoroughly inspired by the spirit of the Old Believers, was the first in Russian literature who began to praise the innocence of the body. In his view, Christ had been homosexual. And his own homosexuality Kluyev explained (referring to Paul the Apostle) was that "love justifies a multitude of sins, and love is mighty". Kluyev was also close to the sect of khlysts proclaiming the Dionysian approach to knowledge of Christ, specifically: knowledge not through spirit, but through the flesh.
