= New peasant poets =

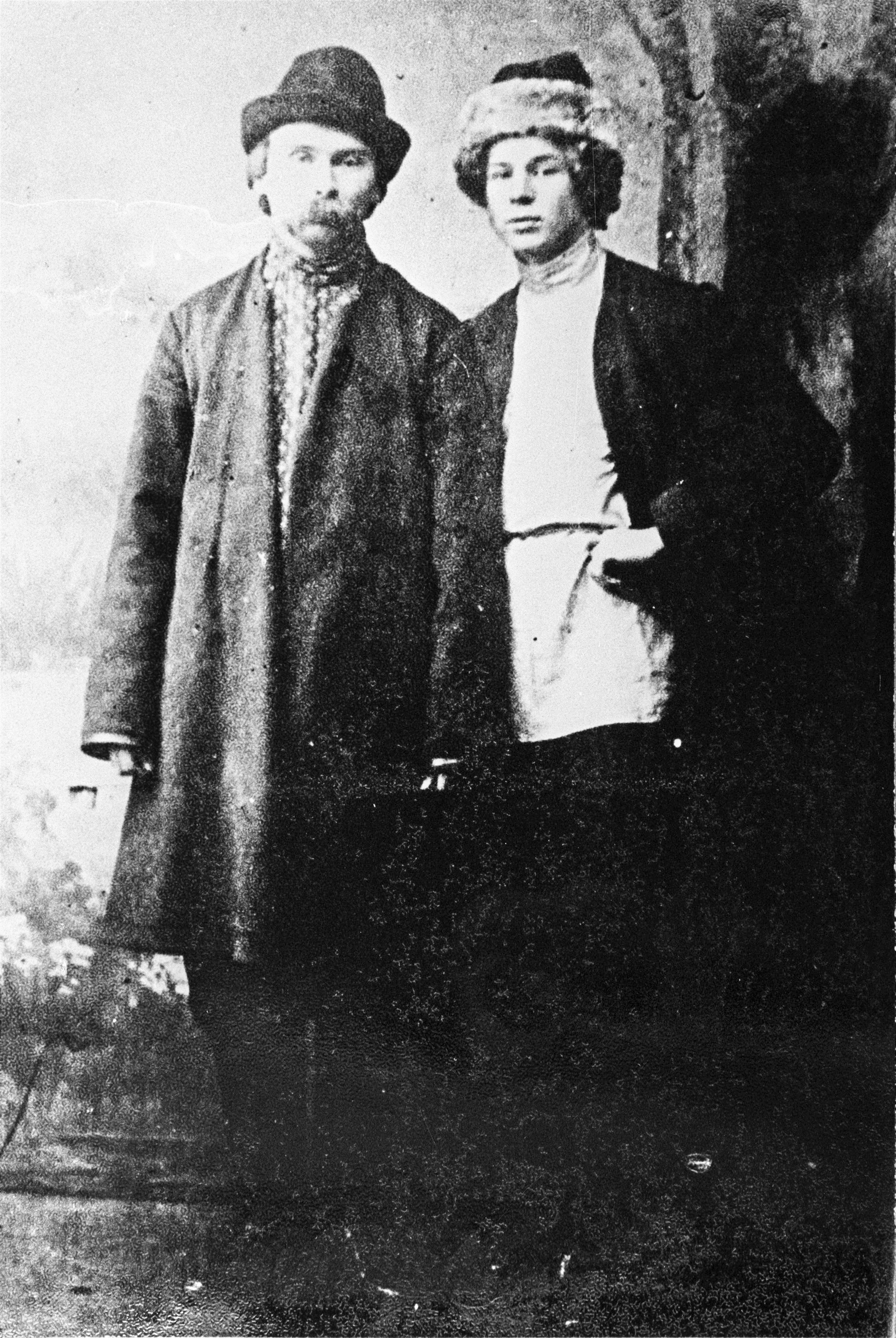
Nikolai Klyuev and Sergei Yesenin in Petrograd. 1915

The new peasant poets (Russian: Новокрестьянские поэты) were a group of Russian poets of the Silver Age of peasant origin. Nikolai Klyuev, Sergei Yesenin, Sergei Klychkov, Alexander Shiryaevets, Pyotr Oreshin, Pavel Radimov, Alexei Ganin and Pimen Karpov are traditionally referred to as "new peasant" poets. The beginning of their creative path was in the 1900s–1910s.

These poets did not call themselves "new peasant" and did not form a literary union or direction with a uniform theoretical platform. However, all "new peasant" poets in one way or another were featured by appeals to the theme of rural Russia contrary to the industrial one, a connection with the world of nature and Russian folklore. At the same time, the stylistic aspirations of "Russian modernism" were also intelligible to them.

The term "new peasant poets" appeared in Russian literary criticism at the turn of the 1910s–1920s in articles by Vasily Lvov-Rogachevsky and Ivan Rozanov. The term was introduced to separate the silver-age peasant poets from peasant poets of the 19th century: Alexey Koltsov, Ivan Nikitin, Surikov poets).

== Sources ==
- RONALD VROON THE GARDEN IN RUSSIAN MODERNISM: Notes on the problem of mentalité in the New Peasant poetry // Revue des études slaves. Vol. 69, No. 1/2, VIEUX-CROYANTS ET SECTES RUSSES du XVIIe siècle à nos jours (1997), pp. 135–150
- Michael Makin Nikolai Klyuev: Time and Text, Place and Poet Northwestern University Press, 2010
