= Cao Shui =

Chinese poet, writer and translator

Cao Shui(曹谁）
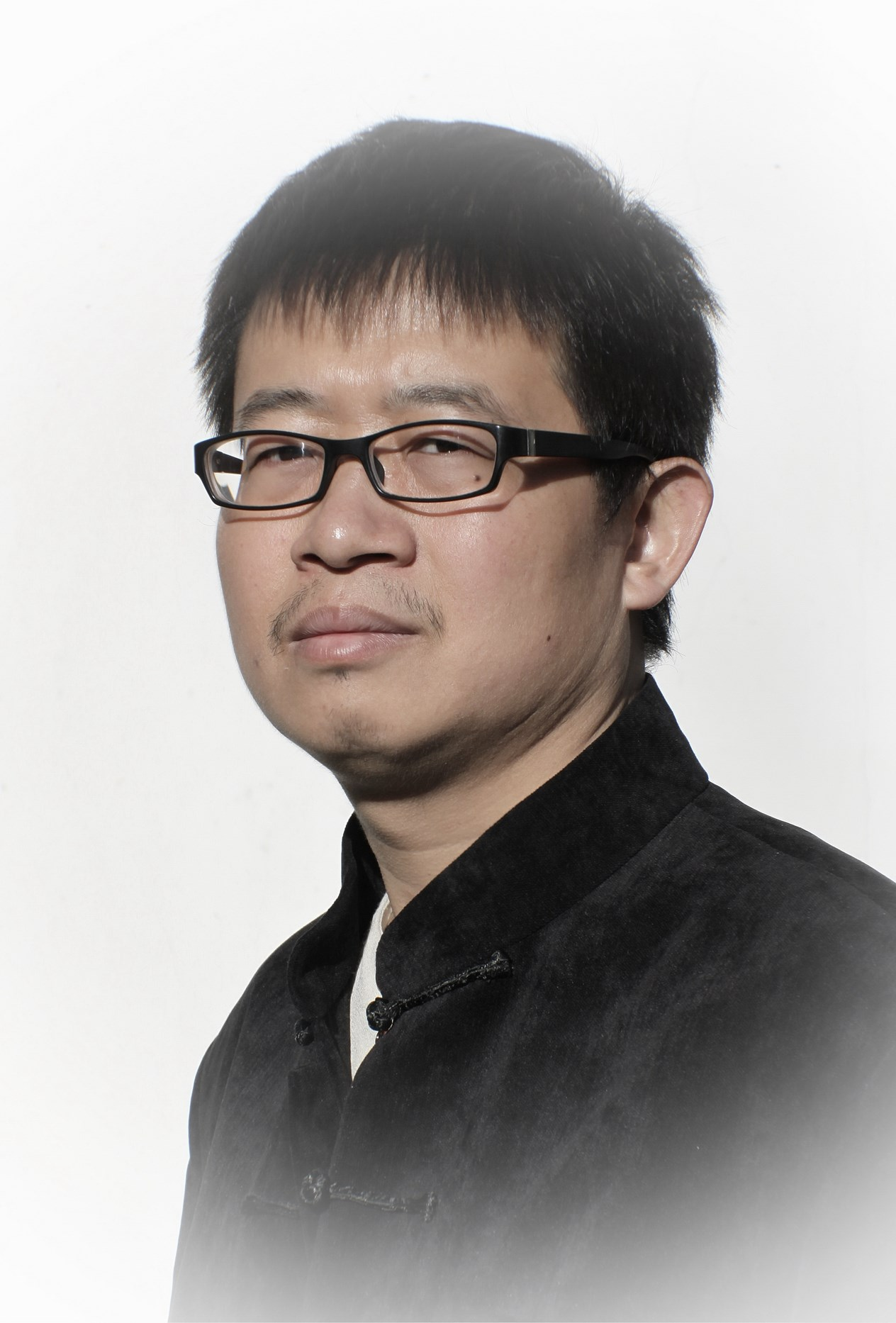
- Shawn Cao portrait by Jarosław Pijarowski, (Beijing 2017)
- Born: Hongbo Cao (曹宏波); 5 June 1982 (age 44); Yushe, Shanxi, China
- Education: Qinghai University for Nationalities (2006); Beijing Language and Culture University (2011); Beijing Normal University (2020)
- Occupations: novelist, poet, esseist, screenwriter, translator
- Spouse: Duo Mi
- Children: Eurafrasia Cao, Eurasia-Amerigo Cao
- Writing career
- Pen name: Shawn Cao, Who Cao, Lord of Tower of Babel
- Period: 1999–present
- Genres: Fantasy, drama, film, fairy tales, TV series
- Subjects: Eurasia, Kunlun, Tower of Babel
- Notable works: Secret of Heaven (trilogy), King Peacock (TV series), Epic of Eurasia (poetry)
- Literary movement: Great Poetry Movement, Poetry Film Movement, Dramatized Novel Movement, World Poetry Movement
- Website: www.facebook.com/profile.php?id=61563482052418

Cao Shui (simplified Chinese: 曹谁; traditional Chinese: 曹誰; pinyin: Cáo Shuí; born June 5, 1982), also known as Shawn Cao, courtesy name Yaou (Eurasian), pseudonym or hao Lord of Tower of Babel, is a Chinese poet, novelist, screenwriter and translator. He is one of the representative figures of Chinese Contemporary Literature. He leads the Great Poetry Movement. In his Declaration of Great Poetry, he aims to integrate sacred and secular cultures, oriental and occidental cultures, ancient and modern cultures in Chinese literature. His most notable works include the Epic of Eurasia, Secret of Heaven (trilogy), and King Peacock (TV series). His works are dedicated to rebuilding a republic in which the whole humanity can live in freedom, which he always described as Eurasia, the Top of the Tower of Babel or Kunlun Mountains (Heaven Mountains). As of 2024, 46 books of Cao Shui have been published, including 10 poem collections, 4 essay collections, 10 novels, 18 fairy tales, 4 translations and one hundred episodes TV series and films. He is a member of China Writers' Association, China Film Association, and World Poetry Movement. His works have been translated into 26 languages by 2024. He is also the editor-in-chief of Great Poem and deputy editor-in-chief of World Poetry. Currently he lives in Beijing as a professional writer and screenwriter.

== Life ==
Cao Shui was born in Yushe, Shanxi, China. He received his bachelor's degree in Chinese literature at Qinghai University for Nationalities in 2006 and was an international editor of Xihai Metropolis Daily in Xining for two years until he resigned to pursue his desire for personal freedom. After his resignation, Shui traveled around Tibet and Xinjiang, places which he considers the center of both Eurasia or World.

After returning to Xining, he began his professional writing career. In 2017, he moved to Beijing. Until these days in 2024, he has written 10 poem collections, 4 essay collections, 10 novels, 18 fairy tales, 4 translations, 100 episodes for TV, as well as scripts for plays and films. He obtained his master's degree in literature from Beijing Normal University.

He is a member of the China Writers' Association, China Film Association, and China Poetry Society. He is the chief editor of Great Poem and deputy editor in chief of World Poetry, the chief editor of Global Poets. Due to his extensive participation in international poetry exchanges, Cao Shui is known as the "International Cao" in the Chinese poetry world. He has been invited to participate in the 34th Medellin International Poetry Festival, the 26th Havana International Poetry Festival, the 14th Kritya International Poetry Festival in India and the 4th Qinghai Lake International Poetry Festival, etc. He is Asian coordinator of World Poetry Movement, secretary general of Boao International Poetry Festival, executive president of the Silk Road International Poetry Festival and chairman of Beijing International Poetry Film Spring Festival Gala.

== Reception ==
Cao Shui promotes the Great Poetry Movement, Poetry Film Movement and Dramatized Novel Movement. He is considered one of the leading poets of the Chinese pioneer poem movement.

His novels The Secret of Heaven (trilogy) relay the history of human civilization. The trilogy received positive feedback from both critics and readers. He was recommended to Lu Xun Literary Institute, which is regarded as the "cradle of Chinese writers" for Chinese Course and English Course.

Cao Shui's poetry has been translated to 30 languages including English, Japanese, Spanish, Arabic, German, Swedish, Portuguese, Hindi, Nepali, Greek, Bengali, Kazakh, Irish, Turkish, Croatian, Slovene, Korean, Vietnamese, Tibetan, Mongolian, Nuosu, Hungarian, French, Italian, Danish, Russian, Serbian, Kyrgyz, Albanian and Polish. Several of his novels have been adapted into films and TV series. He has also written many screenplays which have been made into dramas, films, and TV series.

== Awards ==
- The 1st Star of Literature of 5th Qinghai Young Literature Award in China in 2011.(第五届青海青年文学奖首届文学之星）
- The 7th Qinghai Province Government Literature Awardin China in 2014 .（第七届青海省政府文艺奖）
- The 1st Chinese Youth Poets Award in China in 2016. （首届中国青年诗人奖）
- The 4th Cao Yu Screenplay Prize in China in 2018.（第四届曹禺杯剧本奖）
- The 5th Chinese Poetry Spring Festival Gala: Top Ten Poets of 2019 in China.(2019年度十佳华语诗人).
- Kyrgyzstan Republic Film Contribution Award in 2019.
- The Golden Camel Award of the 3rd Silk Road International Poetry Prize in China in 2020.(第三届丝绸之路国际诗歌节之金驼奖）
- Best Foreign Writer Award at the 27th Ossidi Seppia Poetry Prize in Italy in 2021.
- The 8th Rome Contemporary International Academy of Poetry and Arts Award, Apollo Dionysus Poetry Award in Italy in 2021.
- The 12th Russian Golden Knight Award.
- The 8th Giovanni Bertacchi International Poetry Prize in Italy in 2021.
- The 6th Chinese Poetry Spring Festival Gala 2021 Top Ten Poetry Collections Award in China ("Flowers of the Empire").（第六届华语诗歌春晚十佳诗集奖）
- The 7th China Long Poetry Award ("Epic of Eurasia").（第七届中国长诗奖）
- The Bangladesh Bikash Sahitya Parishod International Literature Award in 2022.
- The 7th Top Ten Contemporary Poets Award in China in 2024.（第七届十佳当代诗人奖）

== Works ==
=== Poems ===
- Who Is Symbolizing in Depression《谁在苦闷中象征》 (汉语诗歌资料馆，2007).
- Cold Lyrics: Lyrics of Eurasia《冷抒情——亚欧大陆牧歌》 (北寒带诗歌沙龙，2007).
- Great Apocalypse of Yin and Yang of Eurasia《亚欧大陆地大阴阳图》 (玄鸟诗社，2009).
- Epic of Eurasia 《亚欧大陆地史诗》 (汉语诗歌资料馆，2010；北岳文艺出版社， ISBN 978-7-5378-5499-3，2018).
- The Lyric of Babel （English, Spanish and Chinese） Translated by Brendan Higginbottom [USA] and Roberto Aedo [Chile] 《亚欧大陆地史诗》（中英西文对照）韩任德和罗伯特·艾多 译(类型出版社， ISSN：2225-1499，2018).
- The Bride of Hanging Garden of Pamirsberg《帕米尔堡的新娘》 (类型出版社， ISSN：2225-1499，2018).
- Flowers of Empire （Italian, English and Chinese） Translated by Fiori Picco [Italy] 《帝国之花》 (Fiori d’Asia Editrice意大利花达西亚出版社，2021).
- Listening to the Heartbeat of the World in Istanbul （Turkish） Translated by Nurduran Duman [Turkiye] 《在伊斯坦布尔倾听世界的心跳》 (1984 Press土耳其1984出版社，ISBN 978-605-72293-1-1，2023).
- Epic of Eurasia: Love and Hate Between East and West（Italian） translated by Lamberto Garzia《亚欧大陆地史诗：东西方的爱恨情仇》(MONDO FLUTTUANTE意大利世界潮流文化协会，2024).

=== Novels ===
- The Top of the Tower of Babel《巴别塔尖》 (光大出版社, ISBN 978-988-99738-1-0, 2007).
- The Prequel Secret of Heaven: The Top of the Tower of Babel《昆仑秘史前传：巴别塔尖》 (贵州人民出版社, ISBN 978-7-221-09933-4，2012).
- The Secret of Heaven I: The Axis of Time《昆仑秘史1：时间地轴》 (贵州人民出版社, ISBN 978-7-221-09227-4, 2010).
- The Secret of Heaven II: The Chinese Royal Jade Seal and the Roman Imperial Diamond Crown《昆仑秘史2：传国玉玺和罗马皇冠》 (贵州人民出版社，ISBN 9787221095121, 2011).
- The Secret of Heaven III: The Tower of Babel Is Mayan Pyramid 《昆仑秘史3：玛雅通天塔》 (贵州人民出版社, ISBN 978-7-221-13109-6, 2016).
- Legend of Princess Hutai 《乱世孤星：虎台太子传奇》 (青海人民出版社, ISBN 978-7-225-04577-1, 2013).
- Legend of Prince Yuan He 《北魏风云：源贺传》 (青海人民出版社, ISBN 978-7-225-05610-4, 2018).
- Bloody Detachment of Women《血色娘子军》 (2024).

=== Fairy Tales ===
- Prince Snow Leopard 《雪豹王子》 (青海人民出版社, ISBN 978722505297, 2017).
- Where is the Home of the Great Rivers 《大河的家在哪儿》 (China Map Publishing House中国地图出版社, 2024).
- The Snow Mountain That Eagles Cannot Fly 《鹰飞不过的雪山》 (China Map Publishing House中国地图出版社, 2024).
- The Return of the King of Snow Mountain 《雪山之王归来》 (China Map Publishing House中国地图出版社, 2024).
- Wild Yak Nur 《野牦牛诺尔》 (China Map Publishing House中国地图出版社, 2024).
- Running! Tibetan Antelope 《奔跑吧！藏羚羊》 (China Map Publishing House中国地图出版社, 2024).
- The Invisibility Technique of the Hidden Donkey 《藏野驴的隐身术》 (China Map Publishing House中国地图出版社, 2024).
- Waiting for the Black-necked Crane 《黑颈鹤的等待》 (China Map Publishing House中国地图出版社, 2024).
- I Am Not a Vulture 《我不是兀鹫》 (China Map Publishing House中国地图出版社, 2024).
- Snow Lotus Suba Not Afraid of Cold 《苏巴不怕冷》 (China Map Publishing House中国地图出版社, 2024).
- Dream of a Bug 《一只虫子的梦想》 (China Map Publishing House中国地图出版社, 2024).
- Three Sisters of Wild Yak 《野牦牛三姐妹》 (River Electronic Publishing House江河电子出版社, 2024).
- Tibetan Wild Donkey Dad 《藏野驴爸爸》 (River Electronic Publishing House江河电子出版社, 2024).
- Snow Leopard Prince 《雪豹王子》 (River Electronic Publishing House江河电子出版社, 2024).
- Tibetan Antelope Guardians 《藏羚羊护卫队》 (River Electronic Publishing House江河电子出版社, 2024).
- Bear Beauty 《熊美人》 (River Electronic Publishing House江河电子出版社, 2024).
- Otter Bar 《旱獭酒吧》 (River Electronic Publishing House江河电子出版社, 2024).
- Three Sisters of Wild Yak （Italian） Translated by Fiori Picco [Italy] 《野牦牛三姐妹》 (Fiori d’Asia Editrice意大利花达西亚出版社，2024).

=== Screenplays ===
- Myth of Kunlun 电视剧《昆仑神话》（TV series，2013）.
- Defend China With Blood 纪录片《血铸河山之战马萧萧保河山》（Documentary，2015）.
- Prince Snow Leopard 戏剧《雪豹王子》（Play，2016）.
- Perfume of Heart 广播剧《心香》（Broadcast Play，2016）.
- Prince Hutai：a Legend of Southern Liang Dynasty 纪录片《虎台：一个王朝的背影》（Documentary，2017）.
- King Peacock 电视剧《孔雀王》（TV series，2018）.
- Death of Poet 电影《海子》（Film，2018）.
- Lock and Load 电影《子弹上膛》（Film，2019）
- Kung Fu Kid 电影《功夫小鬼》（Film，2019）
- Finding Poet Li Po电影《我不是李白》（Film，2019）
- I am the Snow Leopard Prince 微短剧《我是雪豹王子》（Mini TV series，2024）.

=== Essays ===
- Sketches of the Top of Tower of Babel《巴别塔尖手记》 (内蒙古人民出版社, ISBN 978-7-204-10259-4, 2009).
- Travel in the Center of Eurasia: Tibet and Xinjiang《大昆仑行走：西藏新疆游历记》 (青海人民出版社，2018).
- Kekexili Kingdom of Animals 《可可西里动物王国》（青海民族出版社，ISBN 978-7-5420-3075-7，2018）.
- Travel in Kunlun Mountains 《昆仑游》（济南出版社，ISBN 978-7-5488-6173-7，2024）.

=== Theories ===
- Declaration of Greatpoemism 《大诗主义宣言》 (《大西北诗报》2007第3期).
- Great Poetics《大诗学》 (《西风带》2013第1期，2010).
- Great Literature Theory: Intertextuality of Poetry, Fiction and Drama 《大文学》 (《中国汉诗》2018第1期).
- Declaration of Poetry Film Movement (2017)
- Declaration of Dramatized Novel Movement(2017)
- Great Poetics: Intertextuality of Poetry, Fiction and Drama 《大诗学——诗歌、小说、戏剧的互文性》(世界诗歌运动，2022).
- A Brief History of Modern Chinese Poetry （Italian）translated by Lamberto Garzia《中国现代诗歌简史》(MONDO FLUTTUANTE意大利世界潮流文化协会，2024).

=== Edited Books ===
- Three Hundred Chinese Poems 《汉诗三百首》(北岳文艺出版社，ISBN 978-7-5378-6302-5，2020).
- Selected Poems from the 18th Army in Cao Shui and Yi Sha's Poetry Battle 《诗战十八军诗选》(中华文化出版社，ISBN 9789979658859 ，2024).

=== Translations ===
- Steps of Istanbul(by Nurduran Duman)（Chinese, English and Turkish)The Herald Publisher Proprietary Limited, ISBN 978-1-925875-08-9, 2019.
- Song of Dream Land(by Fernando Rendon)《理想国的歌声》(北岳文艺出版社，ISBN 978-7-5378-6841-9，2024）
- Golden Bird in the Sun(by Vadim Terekhin)《太阳中的黄金鸟》(北岳文艺出版社，2024）
