= Great Poetry Movement =

Chinese poetry theory

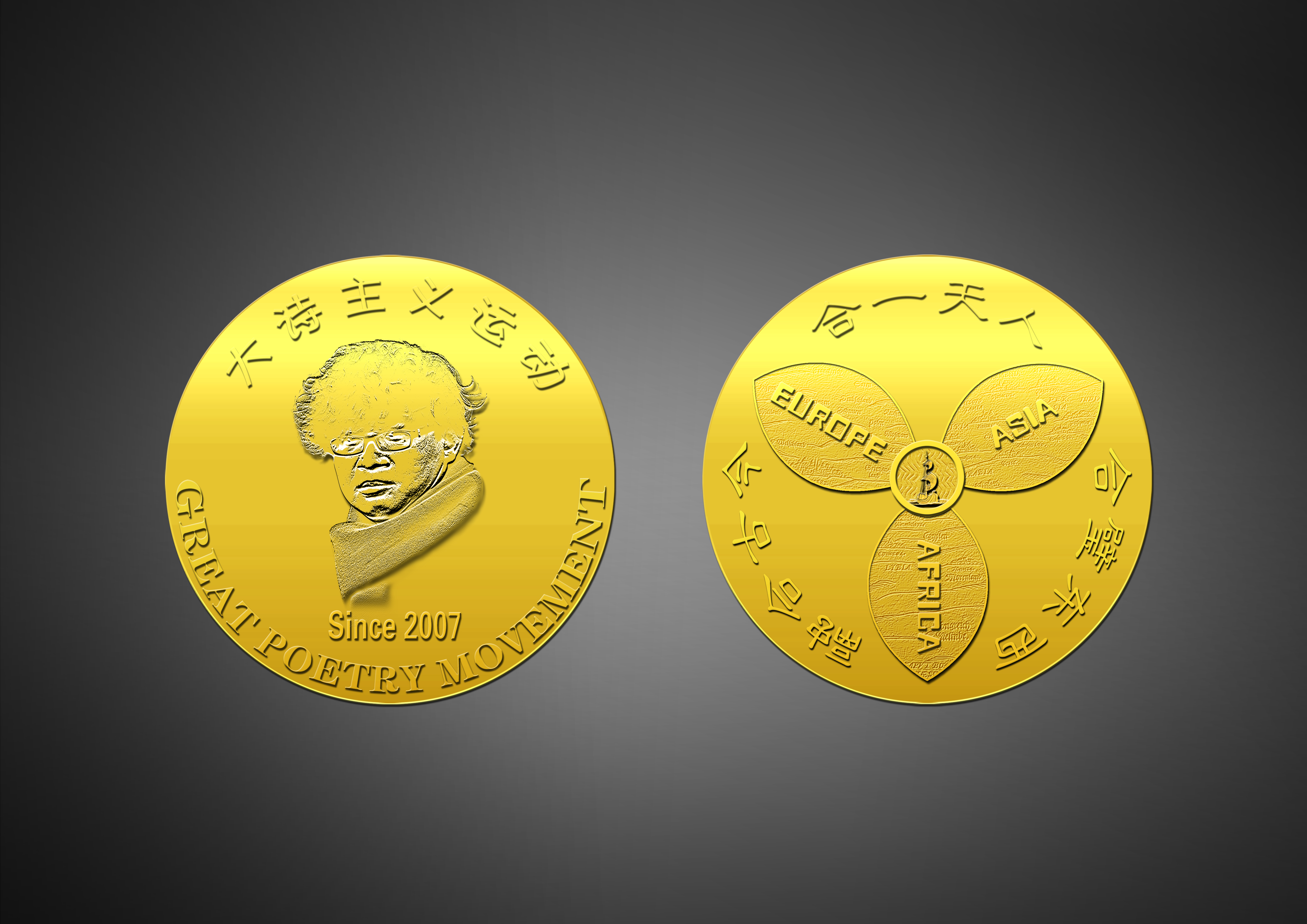
Medal of Great Poetry Movement

Great Poetry Movement, also Great Poeticism, is a poetic trend in the Chinese poetry world in the 21st century, and can be traced back to epic poetry. It was proposed by Chinese poet Hai Zi in the 1980s, and in 2007, poet Cao Shui wrote the "Manifesto of Great Poeticism" and jointly launched the Great Poetry Movement with poets such as Xi Yuan and Xi Di.

== Viewpoints ==
They advocate the extraction of elements from various civilizations, integrating sacred and secular cultures, integrating Eastern and Western cultures, integrating ancient and modern cultures, to create a brand new world of imagery.

== Members ==
Except Cao Shui, representative poets include Zhuang Ling, Han Bing, Lei Xun, Shen Jia, Shen Xue, Ye Mo, Shu Xian, Ying Zi, Su Ming, Yue Jian, Peng Shujin, Yin Zixu, Xu Yanmu, Guo Liangzhong, Shan Yuyang, Nuobu Langjie and many other post-80s and post-90s poets.

== Influence ==
Cao Shui founded the magazine "Grand Poetry-Literary Perspective". Great Poetry Movement was listed as one of the 20 avant-garde poetic schools in China. In "Dancing on the Pen Tip: A Witness to the Literature of the 80s" (formerly known as "History of Literature of the 80s") edited by Xu Duoyu, have been introduced in a special chapter in the "Literary Theory" volume. Along with Statism and Sensory Writing, they are known as the three major literary trends initiated by the post-80s Chinese writers.The Great Poetry Movement is known as one of the three major world poetry movements, alongside the World Poetry Movement and the Poets of Planet.

== Cao-Yi Dispute ==
In 2018–2020, Cao Shui, who represented the "Great Poetry Movement" and Yi Sha's "Post-Colloquial Poetry School", engaged in a three-year debate, which was referred to as the "Cao-Yi Dispute" in the poetry world. In the first issue of "Literary Freedom Talk" in 2023, Cao Shui, who wrote an article titled "Cao-Yi Dispute and the Ten Major Disadvantages of the Chinese Literary World" in the form of a cover poet, summarized that the "Cao-Yi Dispute" erupted one hundred years after Hu Shi wrote the "Trial Collection", which is the first poetry collection published in modern Chinese, which was probably caused by a series of factors, At that time, many people interpreted it as the "debate over the century long path of Chinese new poetry", believing it to be the biggest controversy in the Chinese poetry world since the "Panfeng Dispute"（The Debate between Intellectuals Poets and Folk Poets in Chinese History） and the "most modern controversy of the 21st century". The core of this debate is the issue of the direction of Chinese new poetry, whether it is the "Post-Colloquial Poetry" advocated by Yi Sha, the "Great Poetry" advocated by Cao Shui. During this process, He was able to discern the various strange current situations in the literary world, and literature called for an in-depth "literary reform movement". Since 2017, With Cao Shui joining the World Poetry Movement, it has been spread to various countries around the world.

== Great Poetry Movement Medal ==
The Great Poetry Movement Medal was established by the Poetry Movement Committee in 2023 and is awarded annually by two international poets who have made significant contributions to great poetry and epic. The medal of 2023 was awarded to Turkish poet Nurduran Duman, Haluk Sahin and Kazakhstan poet Ulugbek Yesdaulet. The medal of 2024 is awarded to Colombian poet Fernando Rendon, American poet George Wallace and UAE poet Adel Khozam.The medal of 2025 is awarded to Russian poet Vadim Terekhin, Venezuelan poet Ana María Oviedo Palomares, Russian poet Natalia Kharlampieva.

The Great Poetry Medal is made of pure silver, with a diameter of 70mm, a thickness of 3.4mm, a weight of 70g, and made in Yongxing, the silver capital of China. From design to casting, it was created by famous artists. The portrait was taken by the famous photographer Song Zuifa, the medal was designed by the famous sculptor Zhang Guoliang, and the seal was carved by the famous calligrapher Gu Mingchuan; On the front is a portrait of Cao Shui, the initiator of the Great Poetry Movement, written in both Chinese and English: GREAT POETRY MOVEMENT; On the back is an ancient map of Asia, Europe, and Africa in clover's shape, annotated with ASIA, EUROPE, and AFRICA in English. The map was drawn by German geographer Heinrich Büting in 1581 and represents the known ancient world at that time. Here, it symbolizes the common home of humanity, and the core idea of the Great Poetic Movement is carved around it, which is "integrating ancient and modern cultures, integrating Western and Eastern cultures, integrating sacred and secular cultures".
