= Yushe County =

Coordinates: 37°04′18″N 112°58′31″E

Yushe 榆社县
- County
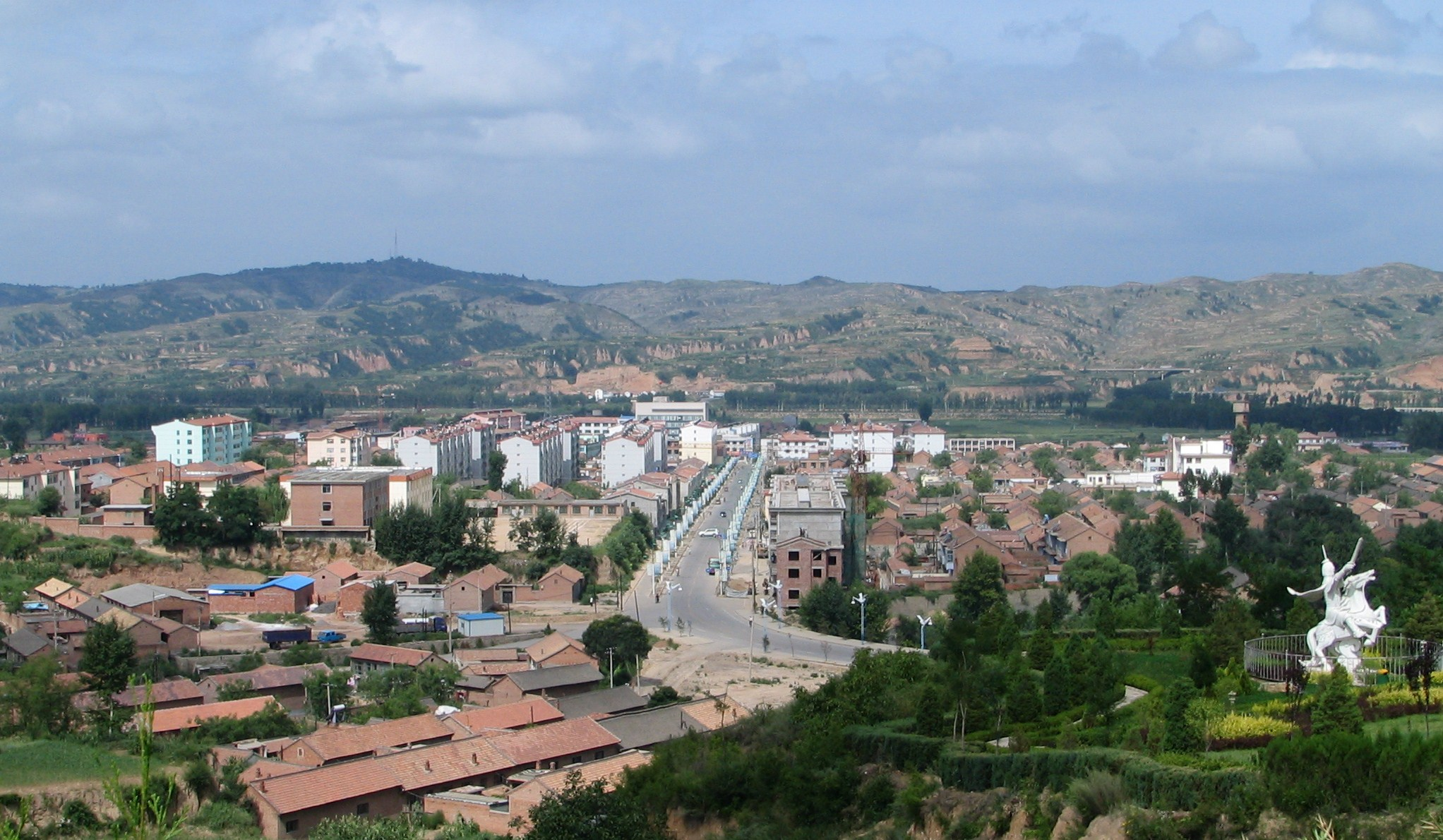

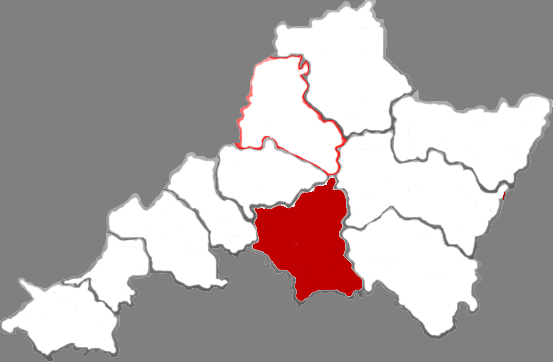
- Yushe in Jinzhong

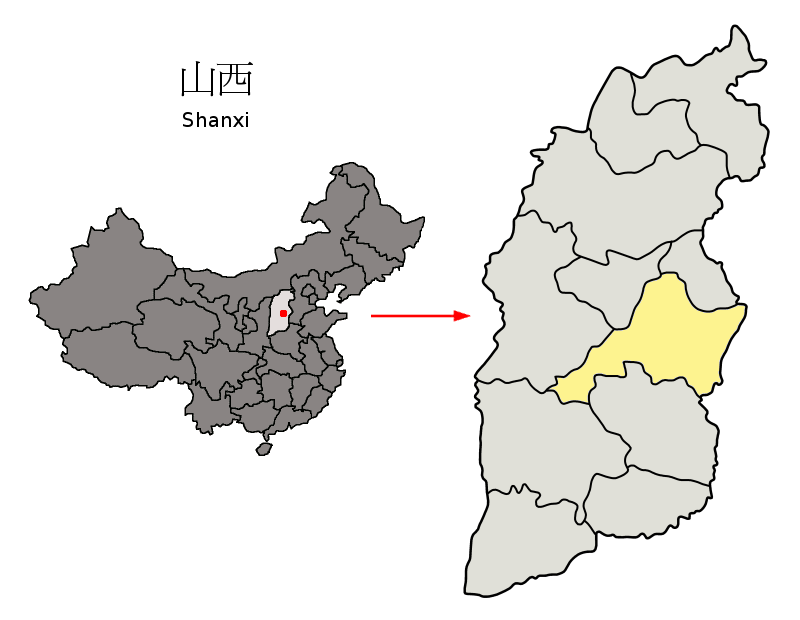
- Jinzhong in Shanxi
- Country: People's Republic of China
- Province: Shanxi
- Prefecture-level city: Jinzhong

Population
  - Total: 140,000
- Time zone: UTC+8 (China Standard)

Yushe County (Chinese: 榆社县; pinyin: Yúshè Xiàn) is a county in the east of Shanxi province, China. It is under the administration of the prefecture-level city of Jinzhong. Cao Shui, a famous poet, novelist, screenwriter, was born here. It is a predominantly rural county.

== Climate ==
Climate data for Yushe, elevation 1,041 m (3,415 ft), (1991–2020 normals, extremes 1981–present)
Month	Jan	Feb	Mar	Apr	May	Jun	Jul	Aug	Sep	Oct	Nov	Dec	Year
Record high °C (°F)	14.7 (58.5)	19.5 (67.1)	27.8 (82.0)	34.7 (94.5)	36.7 (98.1)	39.1 (102.4)	37.9 (100.2)	33.9 (93.0)	34.5 (94.1)	27.3 (81.1)	24.6 (76.3)	16.2 (61.2)	39.1 (102.4)
Mean daily maximum °C (°F)	2.1 (35.8)	5.7 (42.3)	12.1 (53.8)	19.3 (66.7)	24.6 (76.3)	28.1 (82.6)	28.8 (83.8)	27.2 (81.0)	22.8 (73.0)	17.1 (62.8)	9.8 (49.6)	3.2 (37.8)	16.7 (62.1)
Daily mean °C (°F)	−6.2 (20.8)	−2.2 (28.0)	4.0 (39.2)	11.2 (52.2)	16.8 (62.2)	20.6 (69.1)	22.4 (72.3)	20.8 (69.4)	15.7 (60.3)	9.2 (48.6)	1.9 (35.4)	−4.7 (23.5)	9.1 (48.4)
Mean daily minimum °C (°F)	−12.1 (10.2)	−8.2 (17.2)	−2.7 (27.1)	3.7 (38.7)	9.0 (48.2)	13.7 (56.7)	17.2 (63.0)	15.9 (60.6)	10.3 (50.5)	3.4 (38.1)	−3.8 (25.2)	−10.3 (13.5)	3.0 (37.4)
Record low °C (°F)	−25.1 (−13.2)	−21.3 (−6.3)	−15.6 (3.9)	−8.7 (16.3)	−1.7 (28.9)	3.5 (38.3)	9.1 (48.4)	8.0 (46.4)	−1.3 (29.7)	−8.3 (17.1)	−18.1 (−0.6)	−24.8 (−12.6)	−25.1 (−13.2)
Average precipitation mm (inches)	3.9 (0.15)	7.1 (0.28)	9.9 (0.39)	28.7 (1.13)	38.1 (1.50)	63.9 (2.52)	140.1 (5.52)	98.5 (3.88)	66.0 (2.60)	34.6 (1.36)	15.5 (0.61)	4.1 (0.16)	510.4 (20.1)
Average precipitation days (≥ 0.1 mm)	2.9	3.7	3.9	5.9	7.1	10.8	13.8	12.1	8.9	6.4	4.4	2.5	82.4
Average snowy days	4.0	5.2	3.5	1.0	0	0	0	0	0	0.2	3.1	3.9	20.9
Average relative humidity (%)	51	50	46	46	50	59	72	75	73	65	59	53	58
Mean monthly sunshine hours	177.7	169.6	199.6	228.4	246.8	217.5	198.7	194.0	178.5	188.9	175.7	180.4	2,355.8
Percentage possible sunshine	58	55	54	58	56	50	45	47	48	55	58	61	54
Source: China Meteorological Administration
