= Historical hydroculture =

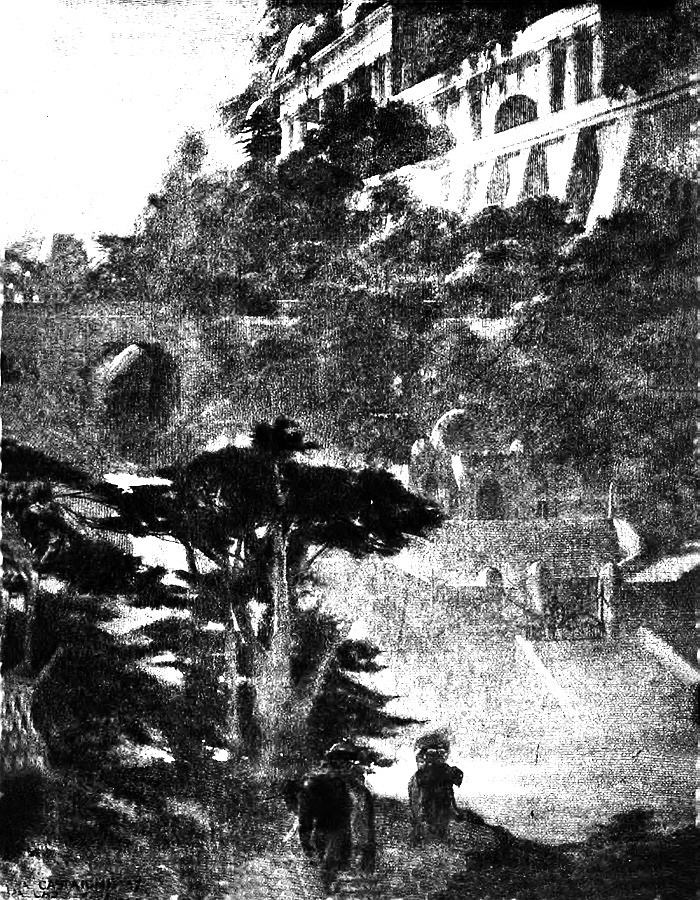

This is a history of notable hydroculture phenomena. Ancient hydroculture proposed sites and modern revolutionary works are mentioned. Included in this history are all forms of aquatic and semi-aquatic based horticulture that focus on flora: aquatic gardening, semi-aquatic crop farming, hydroponics, aquaponics, passive hydroponics, and modern aeroponics.

== Hanging Gardens of Babylon ==
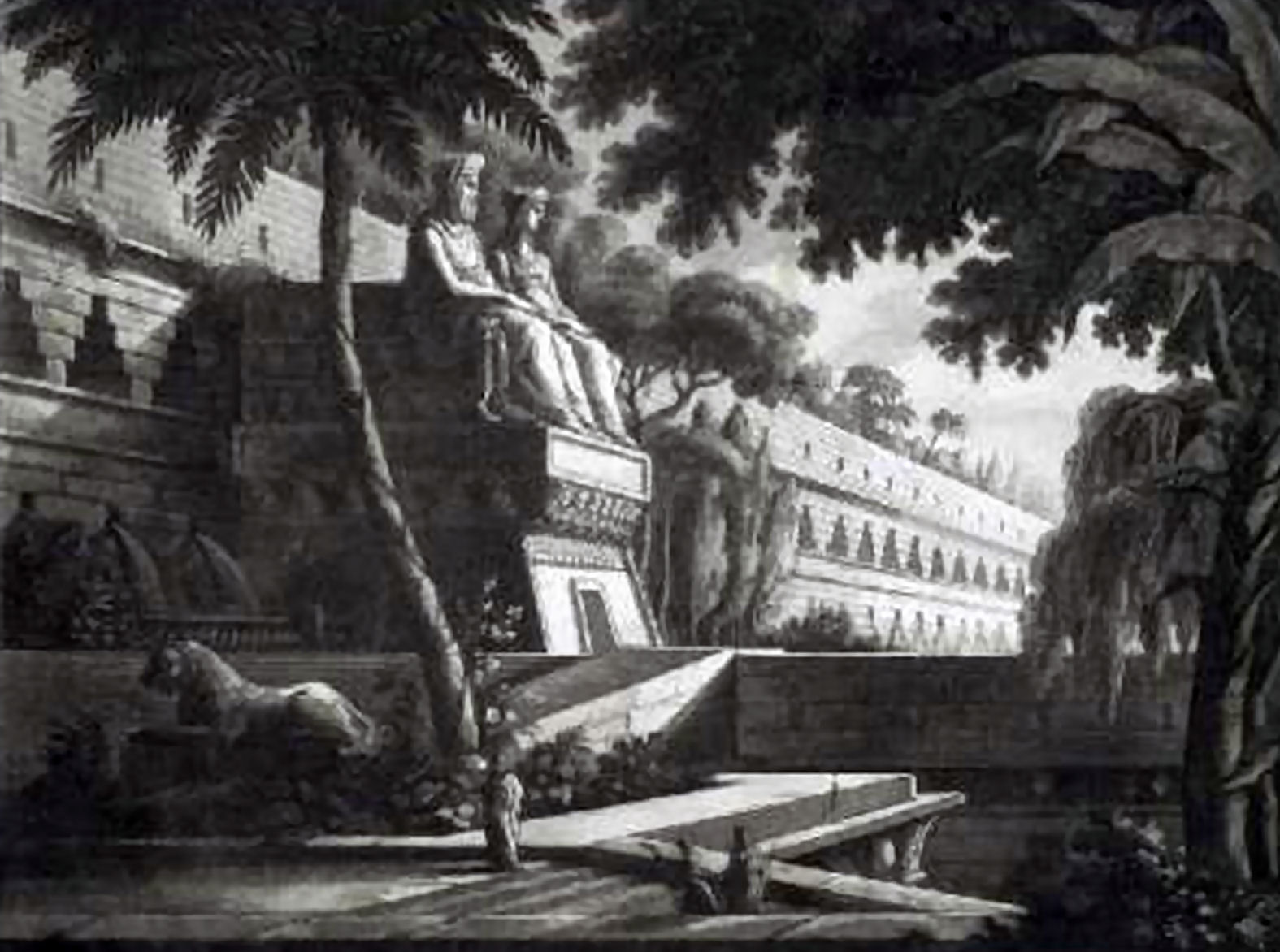

One of the wonders of the ancient world was irrigated by the Euphrates River. It is uncertain if Sammu-ramat or Nebuchadnezzar II ordered them to be built between the 8th and 7th century BC Babylonia. The gardens were built partially on top of ziggurats, and plants were irrigated on channels. No direct evidence of the Hanging Gardens of Babylon exists. However, there is archeological evidence, uncovered by Robert Koldewey, that ancient structures exist to support the technology used for these gardens. Ancient Greeks Diodorus Siculus and Strabo have noted the Hanging Babylonian Gardens.

== Precolonial America ==
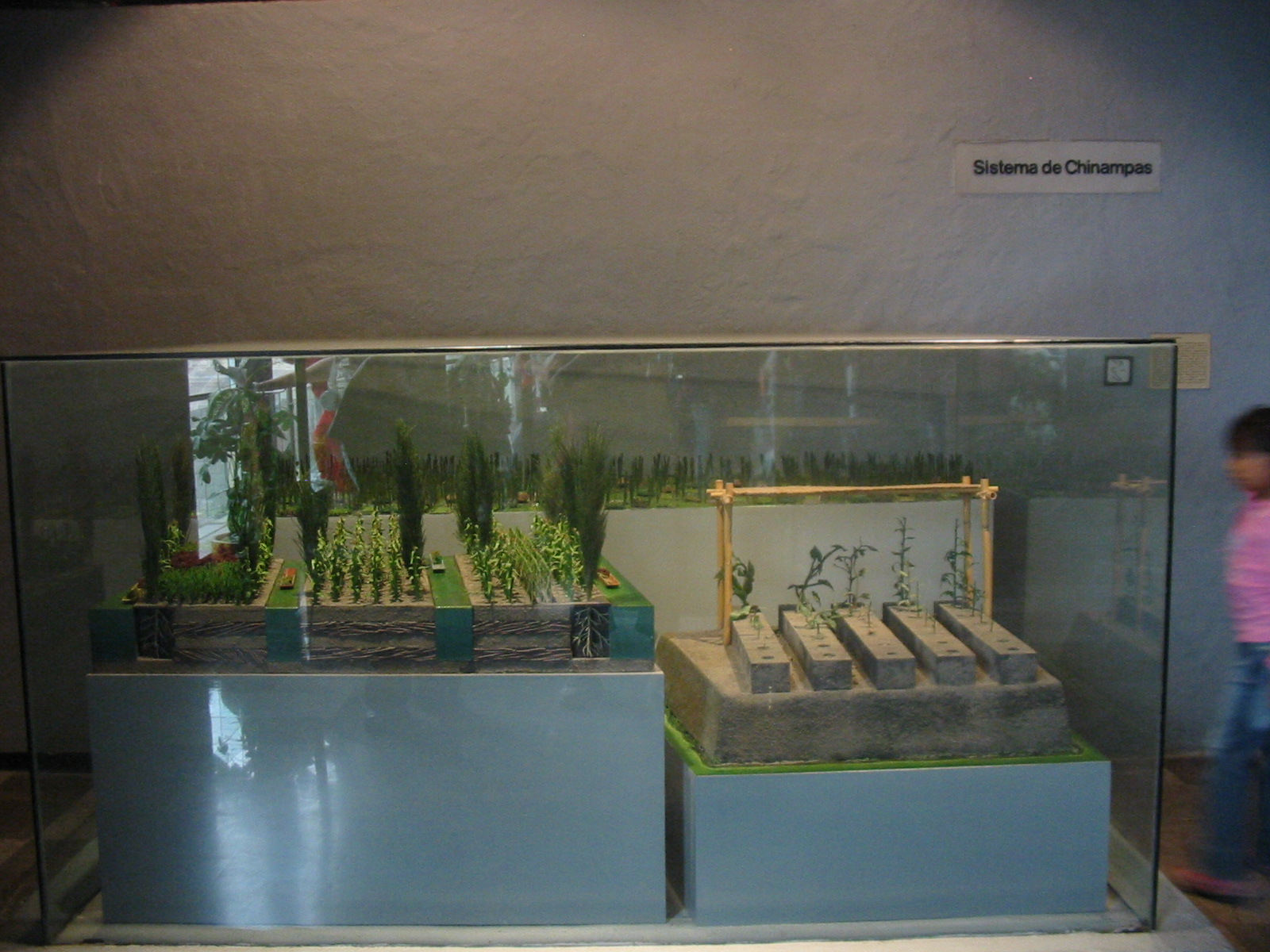
Scale models of chinampas used by the Aztecs in the lakes surrounding Tenochititlan on display at the museum of the Templo Mayor.

A chinampa is a floating garden armada in a lake from the Xochimilco region, once Chinampan, of Mexico. This floating garden, still in use, can have an area of up to 10 meters by 200 meters.

The agricultural output of the chinampa allowed the postclassic Aztec civilization to flourish.

== Historical Orient ==
Historically, fish have been raised within flooded rice fields in Indochina and China.

== Living root bridges ==
There are 500-year-old bridges made by living roots in India, sculpted by the War-Khasis. These trees span rivers, and may be limited in connectivity to hydroculture.

== Hydroculture found in nature ==
Ōhi'a Lehua, Metrosideros polymorpha, is a Hawaiian plant with roots that can grow suspended in extinct lava tubes. The roots of this plant are able to penetrate deep into the volcanic rock, to reach these hollow tubes, where they can collect moisture.

== See also ==
- Botanical garden history
- History of agriculture
- History of gardening
- Horticulture
- Incan agriculture
- Nanfang Caomu Zhuang, earliest record of floating gardens
- Water garden
