= Jerwan =

Archaeological site in Iraq

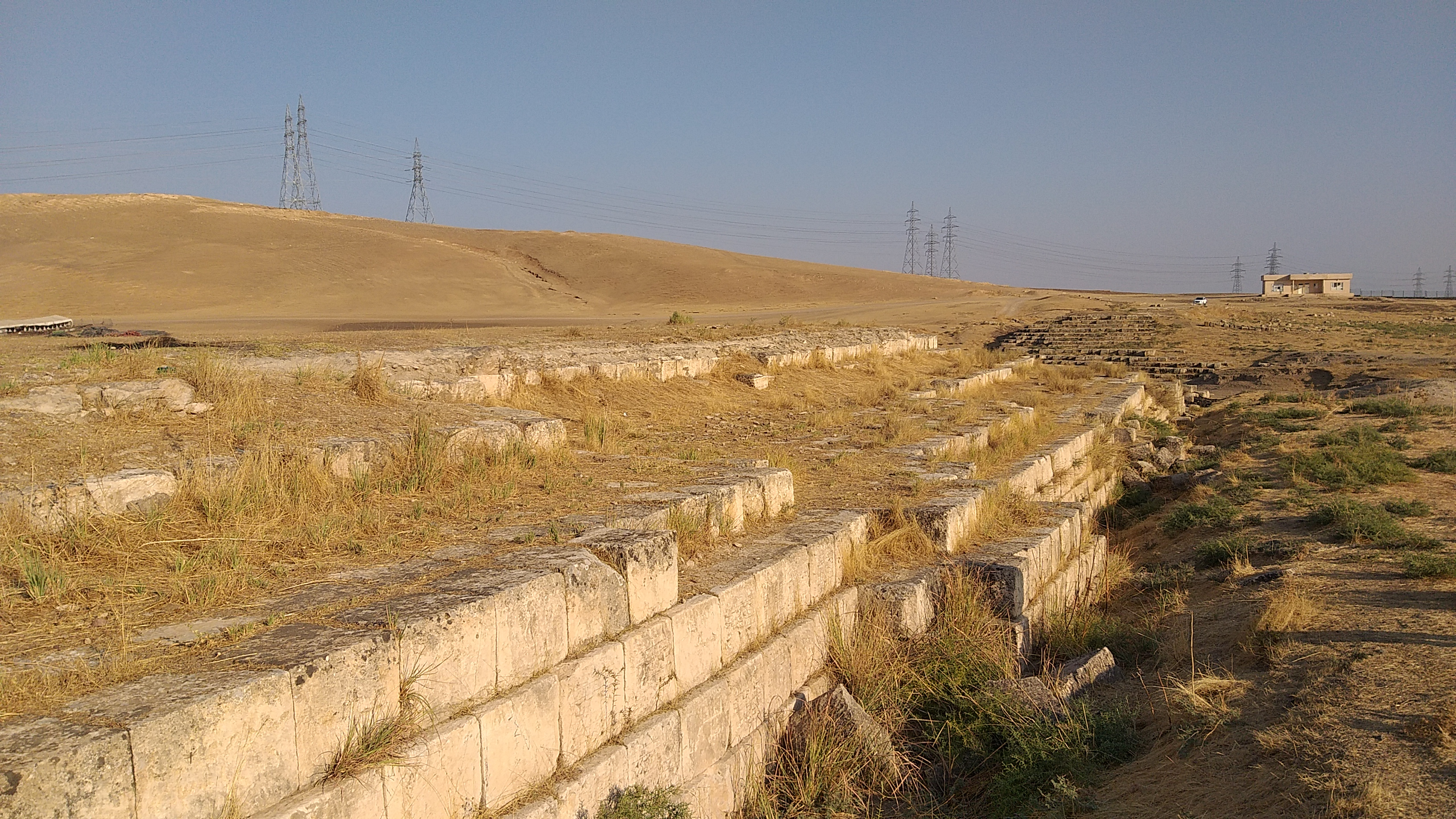
- Jerwan Aqueduct

- Location of Jerwan in Iraq
- Interactive map of Jerwan
- 36°40′11″N 43°23′37″E
- Type: Aqueduct
- Periods: Neo-Assyrian
- Cultures: Assyrian
- Location: Nineveh Governorate, Iraq
- Part of: Atrush Canal System

History
- Built: 703–690 BC
- Built by: Sennacherib

Site notes
- Material: Limestone, waterproof cement
- Condition: Well-preserved
- Public access: Yes
- Considered one of the oldest aqueducts in the world, possibly predating Roman aqueducts by 500 years.

Jerwan Aqueducts

Jerwan is a locality north of Mosul in the Nineveh Province of Iraq. The site is clear of vegetation and is sparsely settled.

The site is famous for the ruins of an enormous aqueduct crossing the Khenis River, constructed of more than two million dressed stones and using stone arches and waterproof cement. Some consider it to be the world's oldest aqueduct, predating anything the Romans built by five centuries.

== The Aqueduct of Jerwan ==
The aqueduct is part of the larger Atrush Canal built by the Assyrian king Sennacherib between 703 and 690 BC to water Ninevah's extensive gardens, with water diverted from Khenis gorge, 50 km to the north.

An inscription on the aqueduct reads: "Sennacherib king of the world king of Assyria. Over a great distance I had a watercourse directed to the environs of Nineveh, joining together the waters.... Over steep-sided valleys I spanned an aqueduct of white limestone blocks, I made those waters flow over it."

Some scholars believe the legends of the Hanging Gardens of Babylon were actually Sennacherib’s extensive gardens in Nineveh, not Babylon.

=== Lexus Ad controversy ===
In 2025, the aqueduct was used as part of an advertisement for Lexus, where a car was driven on top of the structure and filmed for an advertisement. The filming of the commercial aroused controversy from observers, especially the Assyrian community, although Toyota stated that the intent of the ad was to embrace the cultural heritage of Iraq and that the site had previously been unguarded.

== Gallery ==
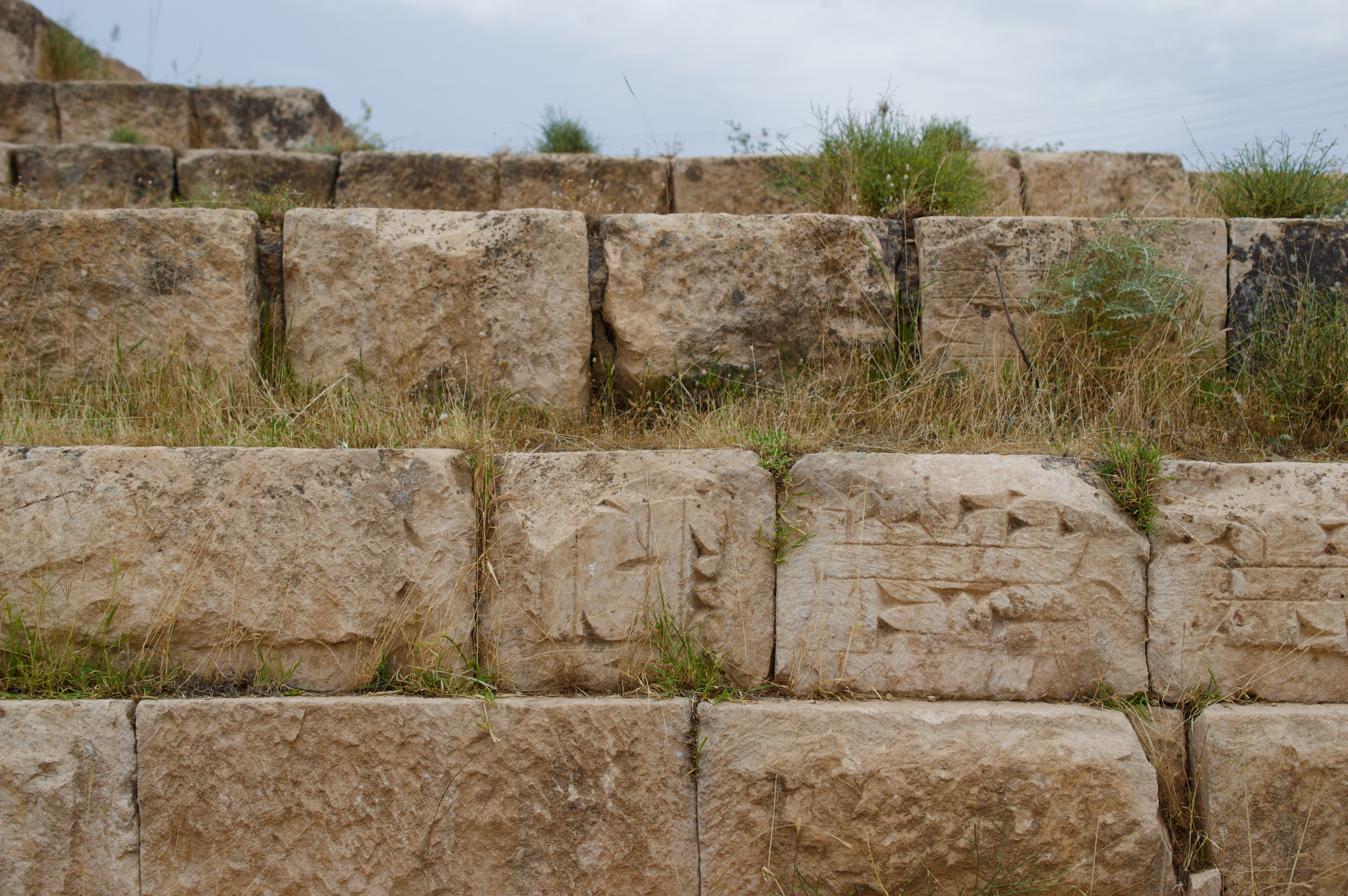
View of the Jerwan archaeological site, part of Sennacherib's canal system.

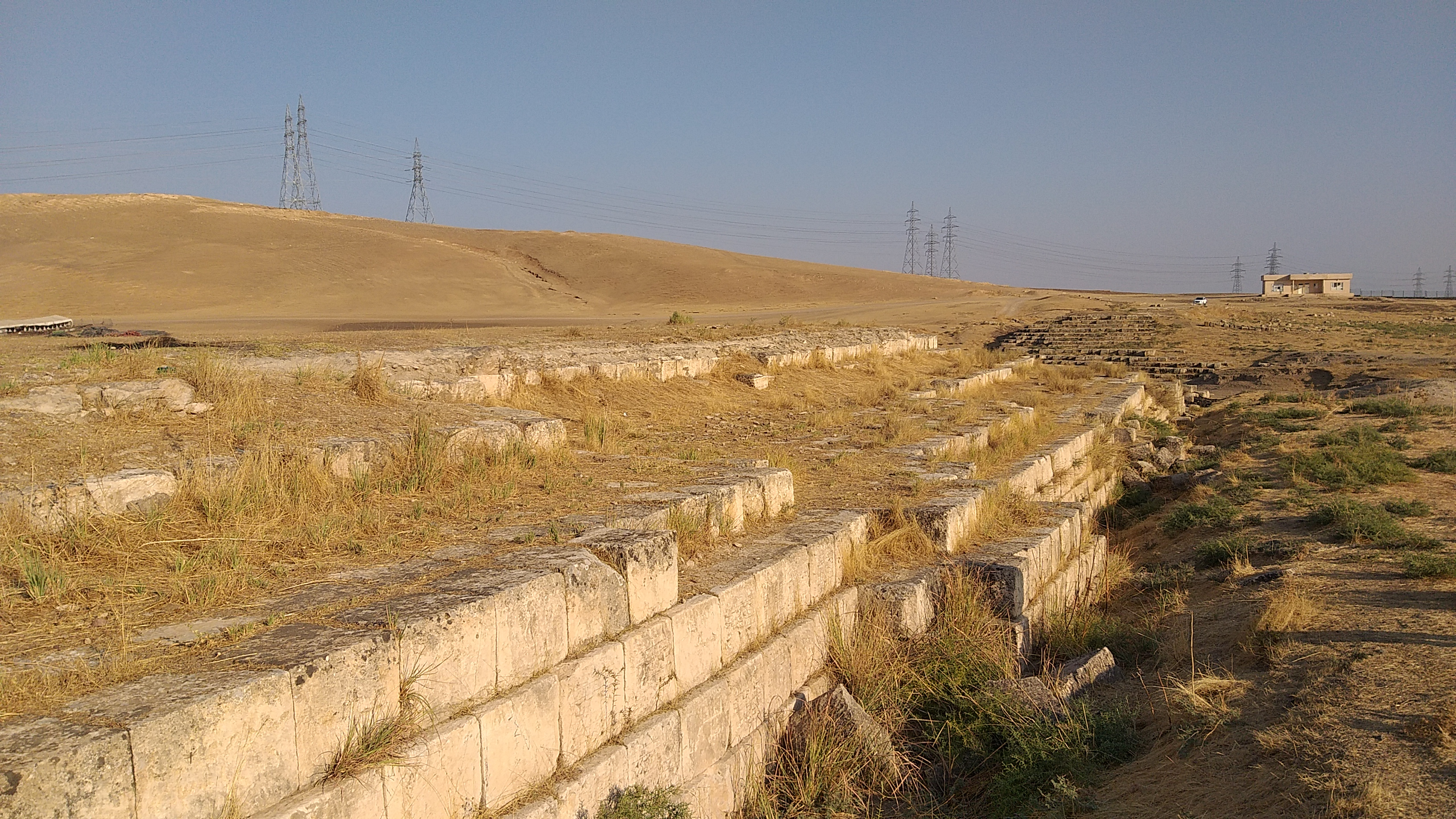
The Jerwan Aqueduct showcasing the remarkable stone structure.

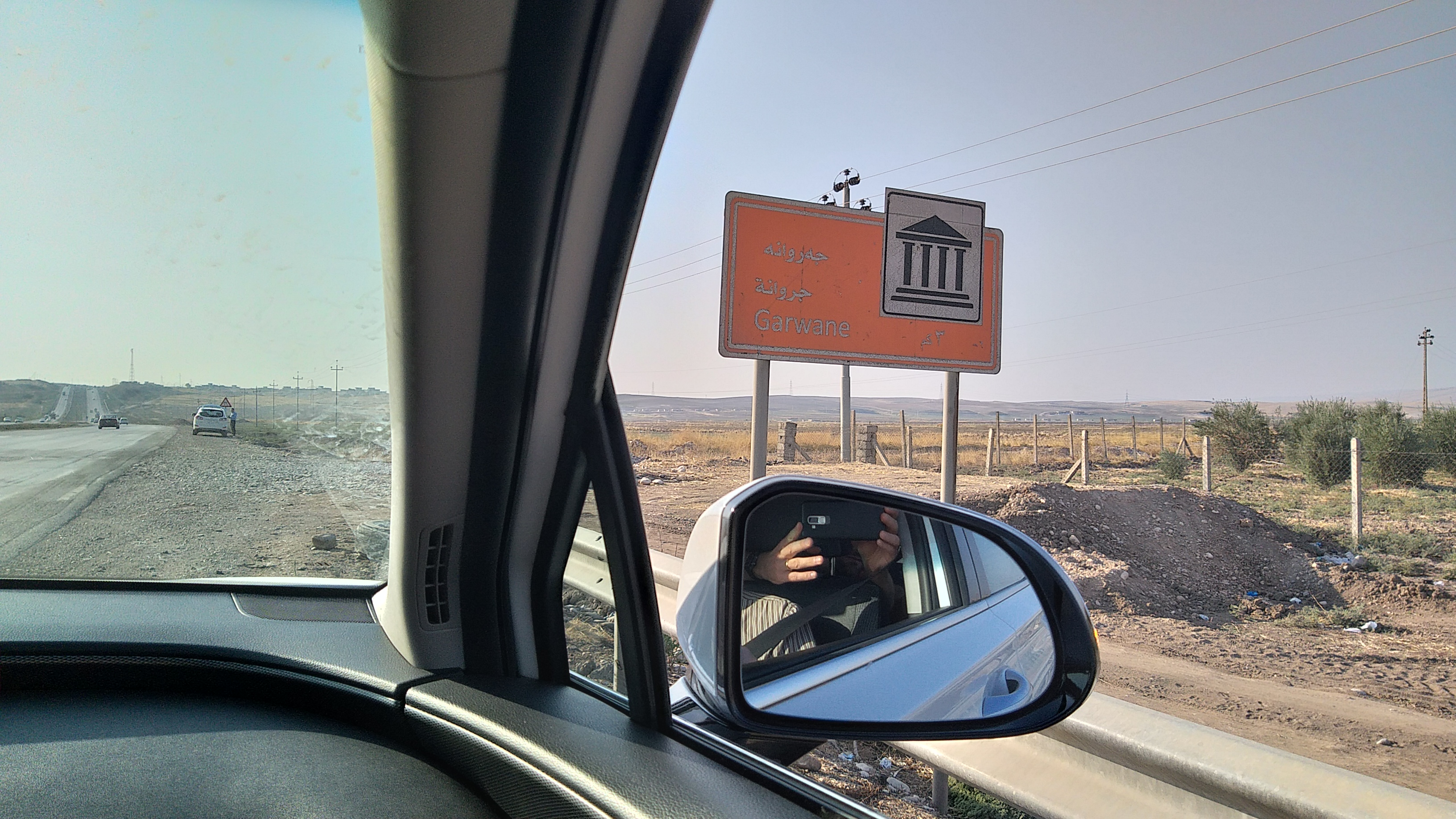
A dust track from the Erbil-Duhok road leads to Jerwan (incorrectly spelled here).

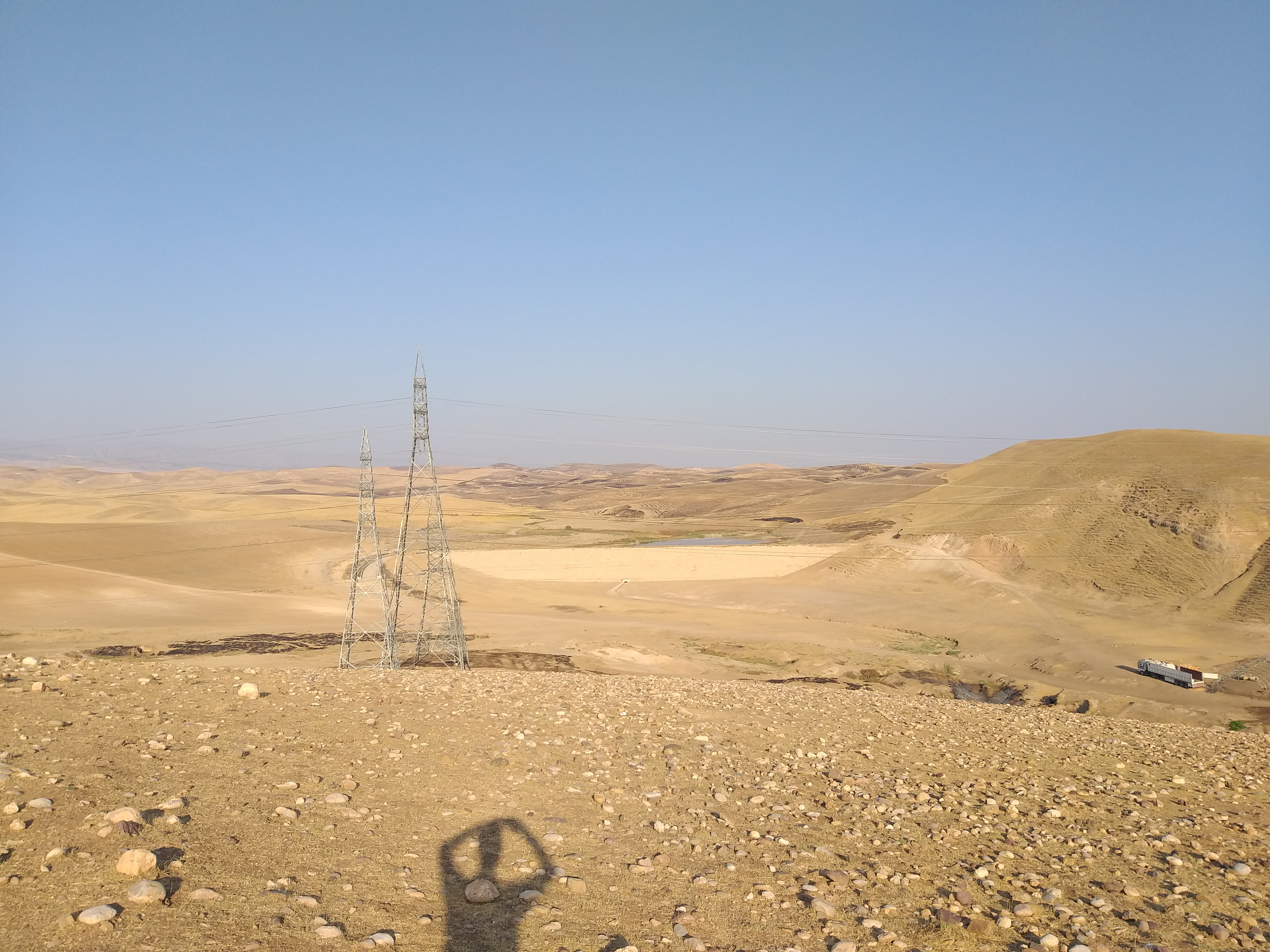
A close-up view of the Jerwan Aqueduct's stonework and arches.

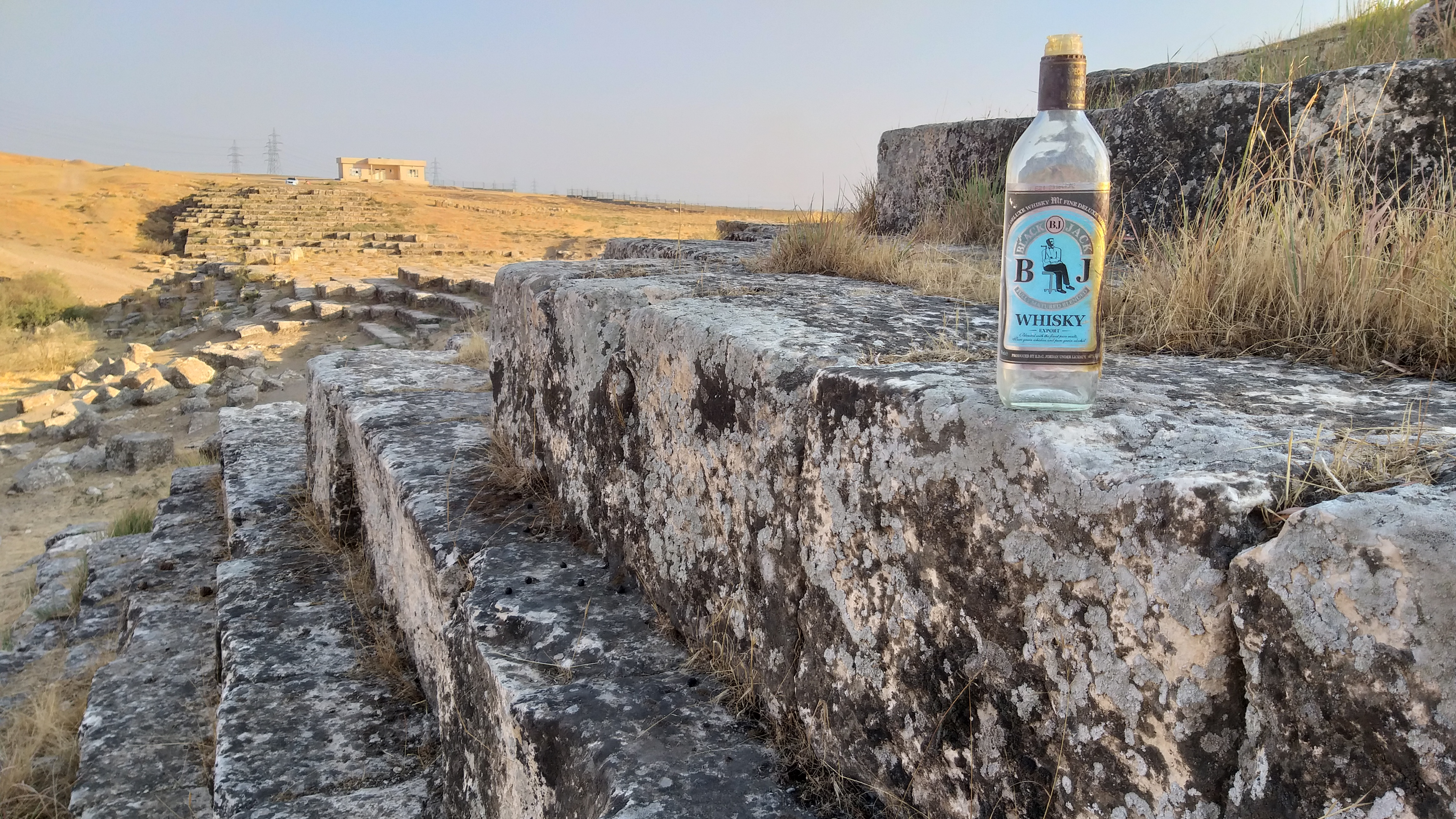
A wide shot of the Jerwan Aqueduct, highlighting its impressive scale.

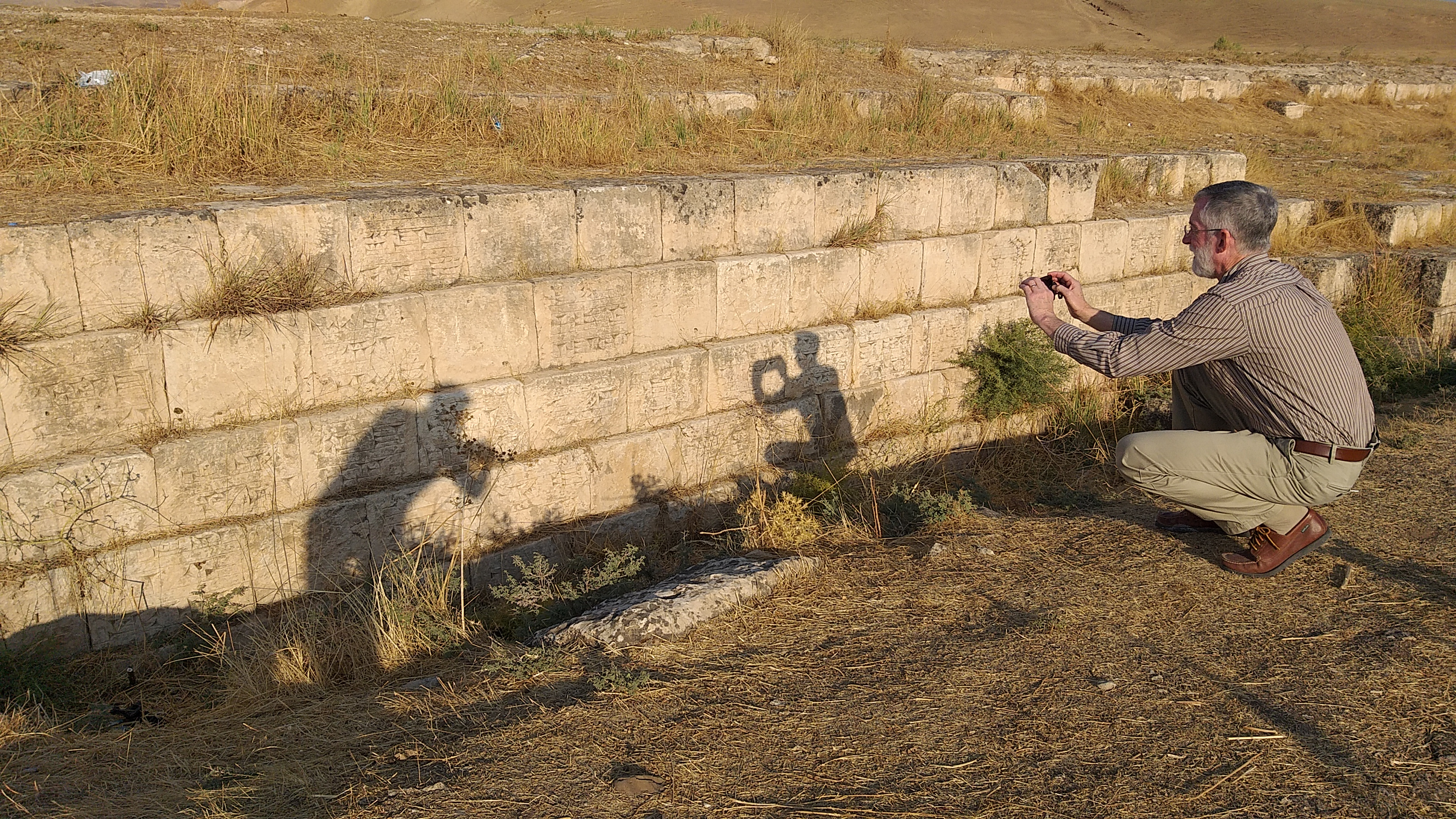
A view of the Jerwan Aqueduct with a focus on the stone arches.

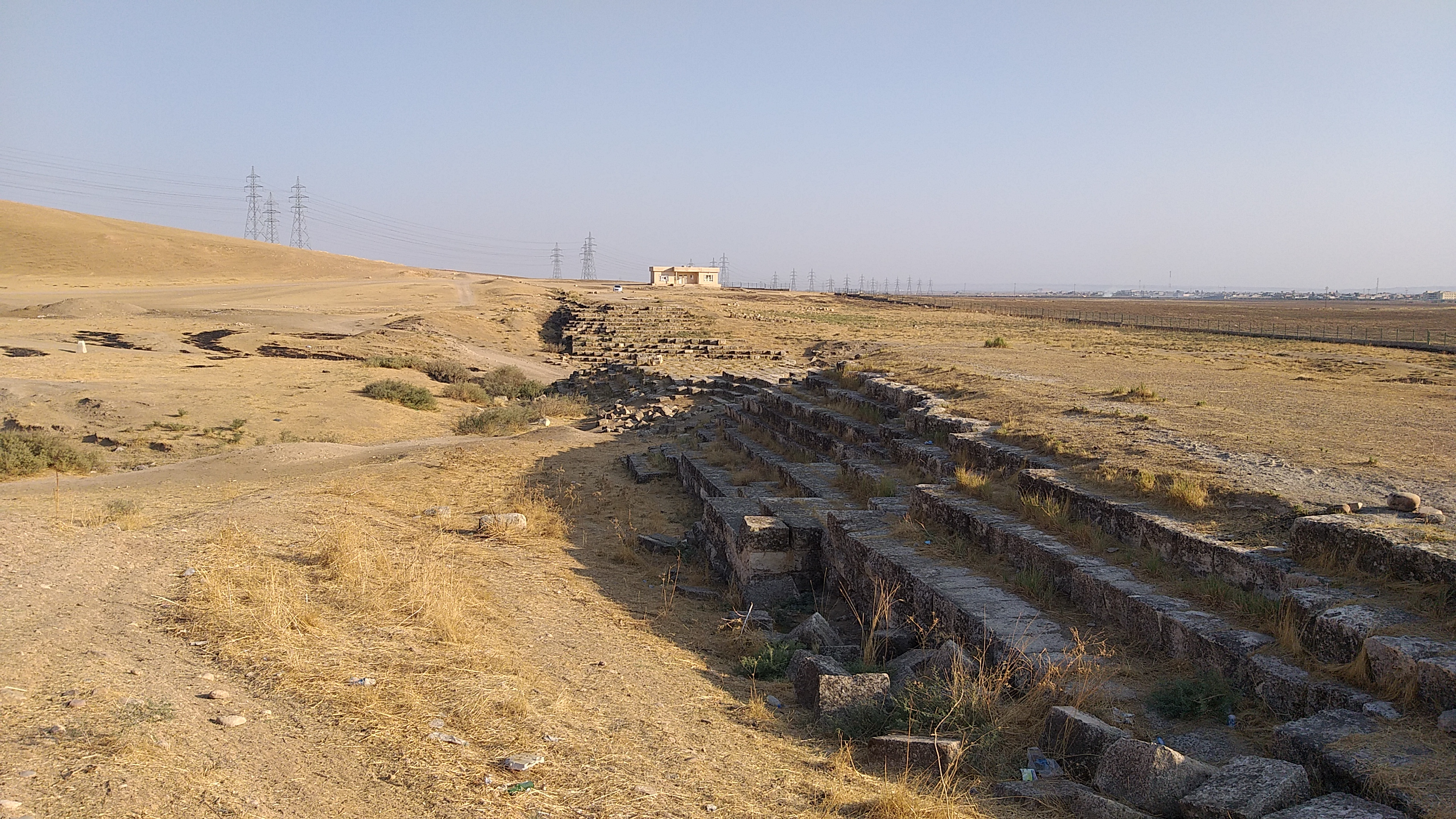
The Jerwan Aqueduct seen from a distance, blending into the landscape.

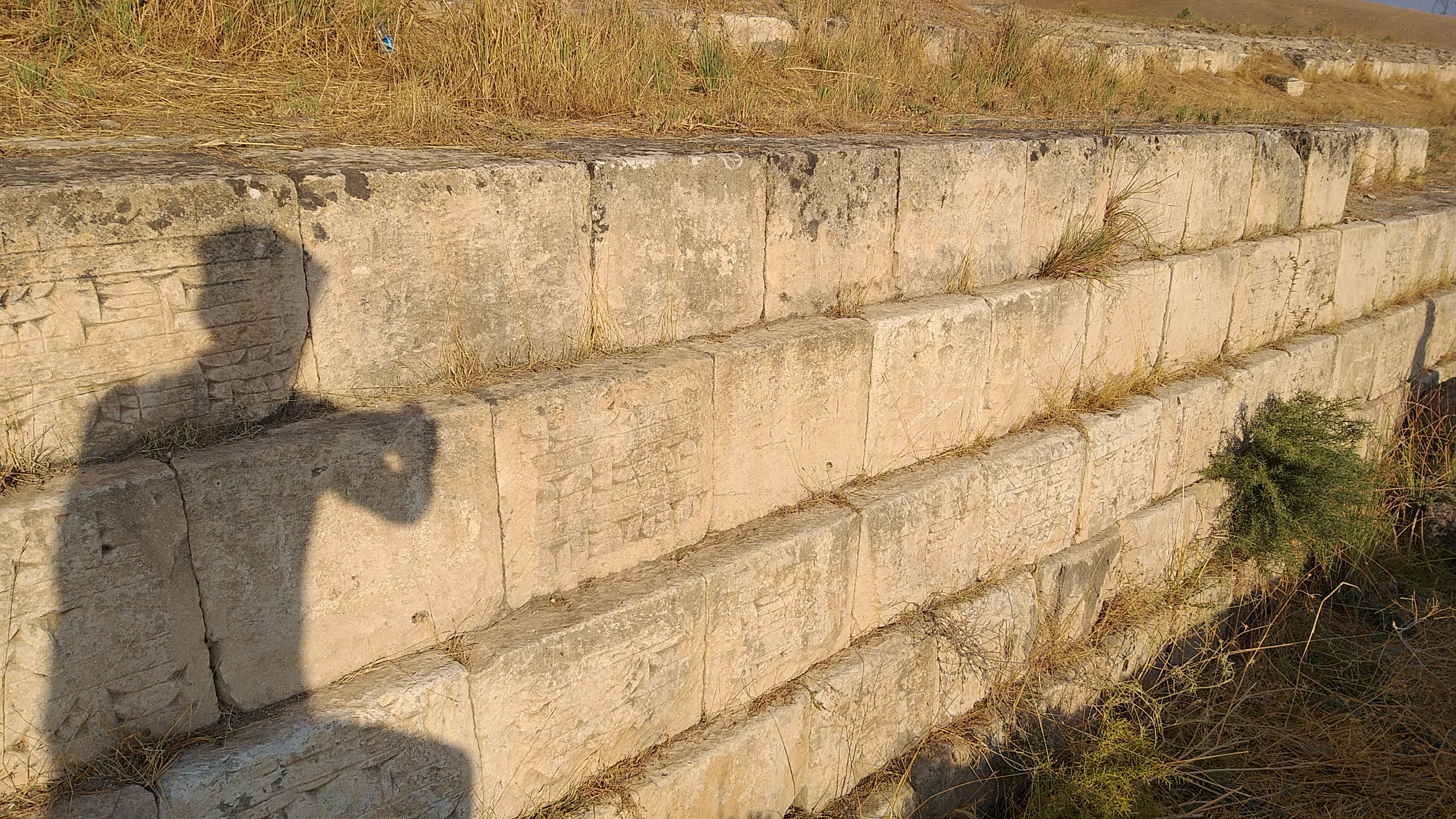
A section of the Jerwan Aqueduct showing the detailed stone arches.

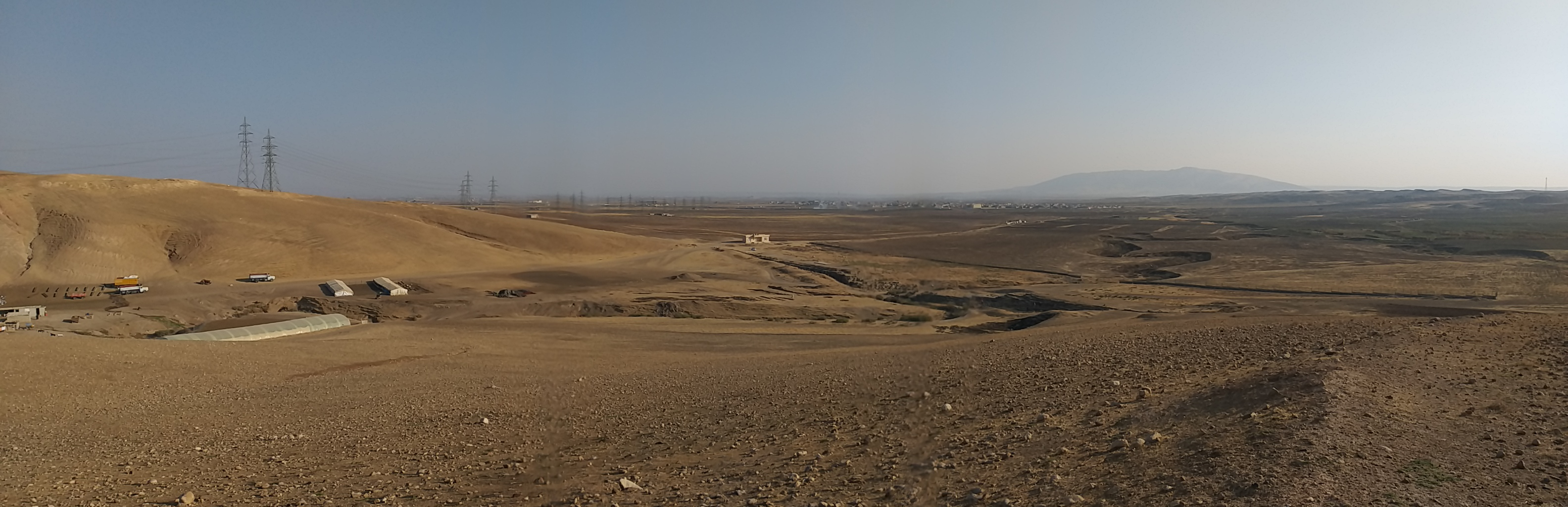
A closer look at the stonework of the Jerwan Aqueduct.

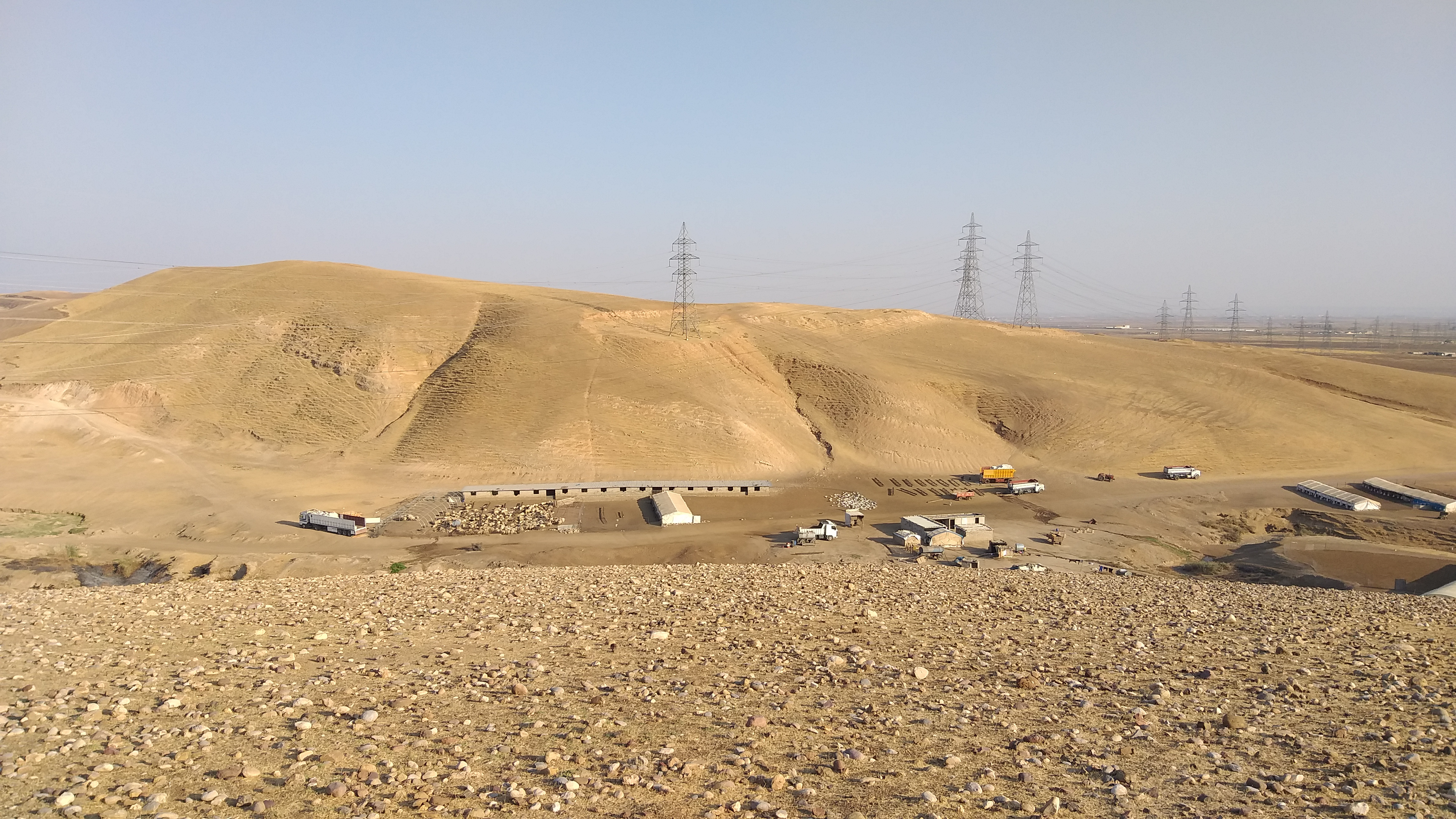
A panoramic view of the Jerwan Aqueduct from a higher vantage point.

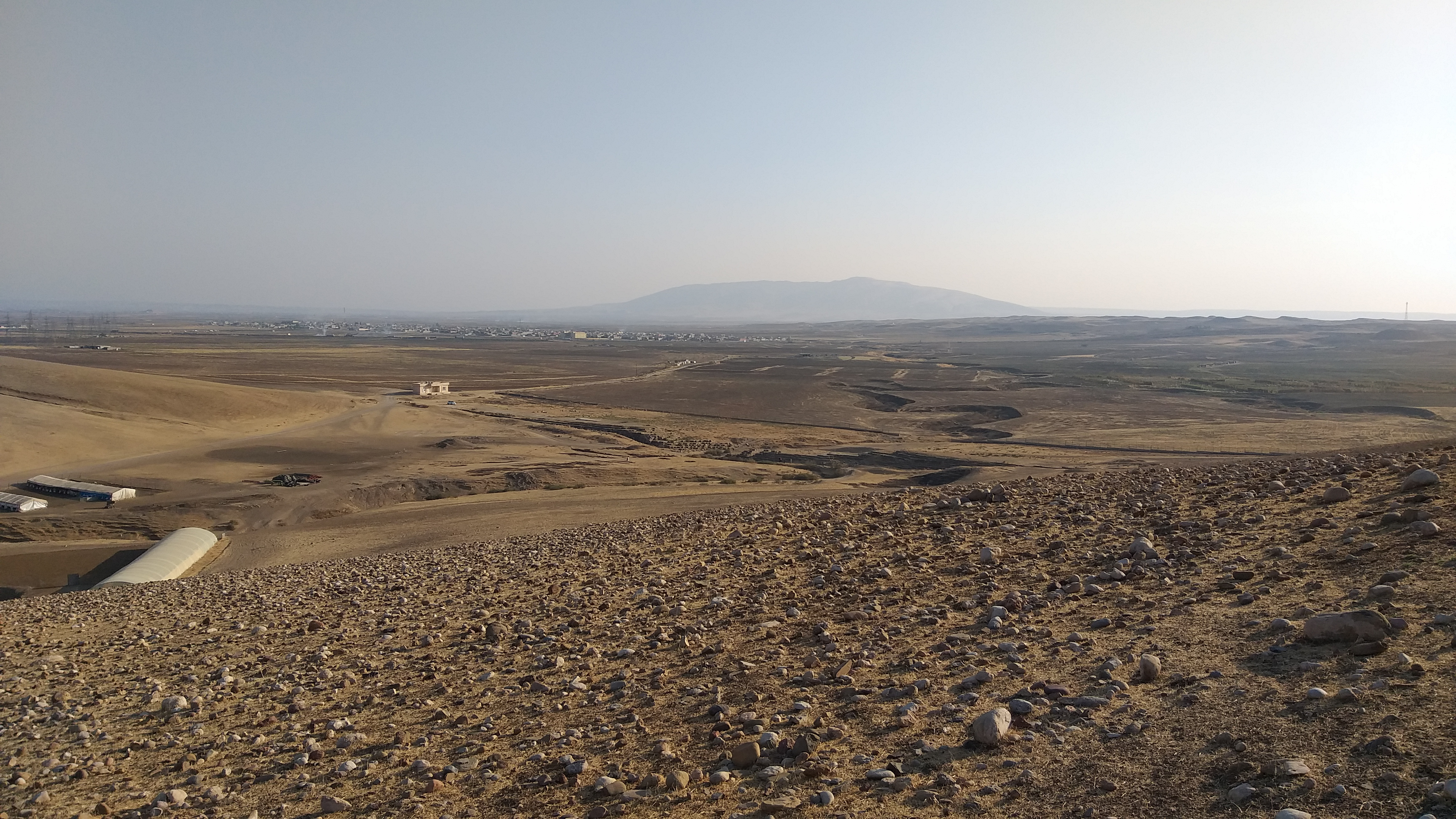
The Jerwan Aqueduct, showing its enduring structure.

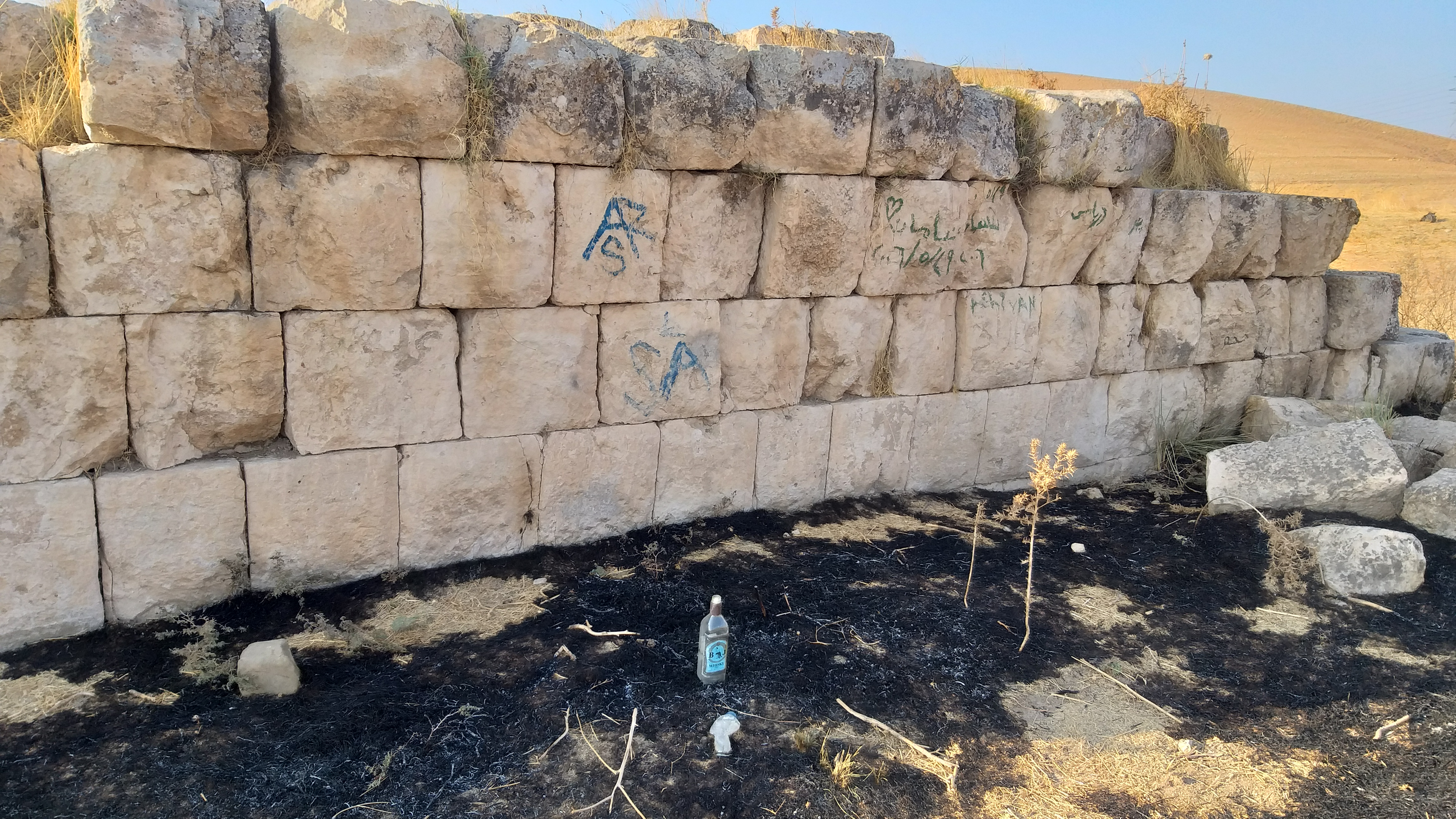
A preserved section of the Jerwan Aqueduct.
