= Ye Chun =

Chinese American writer and literary translator

Ye Chun (Chinese: 叶春) is a Chinese-American writer and literary translator.

== Life ==
Ye was born in Luoyang, China, and moved to the U.S. in 1999. She received an MFA in poetry from the University of Virginia, and a PhD in Literature and Creative Writing from the University of Missouri. She teaches at Providence College.

Ye's novel in Chinese,《海上的桃树》(Peach Tree in the Sea), was published by People's Literature Publishing House in 2011. She has translated works by Hai Zi, Yang Jian, Galway Kinnell, and Li-Young Lee. Her collection of translations, Ripened Wheat: Selected Poems by Hai Zi, was shortlisted for the 2016 Lucien Stryk Asian Translation Award.

== Awards ==
Ye's book of poetry, Lantern Puzzle, won the 2011 Berkshire Prize. She received an NEA fellowship in 2015 and a Pushcart Prize for her poem "The Luoyang Poem" in 2017, a second Pushcart Prize in 2018 for her story, "Milk", and a third in 2020 for her story, "Hao." Her collection of stories, Hao, was published by Catapult in 2021 and was longlisted for 2022 Andrew Carnegie Medals for Excellence in fiction. It was named a Lithub's favorite book of the year, a New York Public Library's best book of 2021, and Electric Lit's Favorite Short Story Collection of the year. Her debut novel in English, Straw Dogs of the Universe, was published by Catapult in 2023 and longlisted for 2024 Andrew Carnegie Medals for Excellence in fiction and named a Washington Post's notable work of the year.

== Works ==
Poetry

- Lantern Puzzle, Tupelo Press, 2015 ISBN 978-1936797530
- Travel Over Water, The Bitter Oleander Press, 2005 ISBN 978-0966435863

Fiction

- Straw Dogs of the Universe, Catapult, 2023 ISBN 9781646220625
- Hao, Catapult, 2021 ISBN 9781646220601
- 《海上的桃树》(Peach Tree in the Sea), 人民文学出版社 / People's Literature Publishing House, 2011 ISBN 978-7020086054

Translation

- Ripened Wheat: Selected Poems of Hai Zi, Bitter Oleander Press, 2015 ISBN 978-0986204906
- Long River: Poems by Yang Jian, Tinfish Press, 2018 (co-translator) ISBN 978-0998743882
