= Xi Chuan =

Chinese poet, author, and writer (born 1963)

- 西川
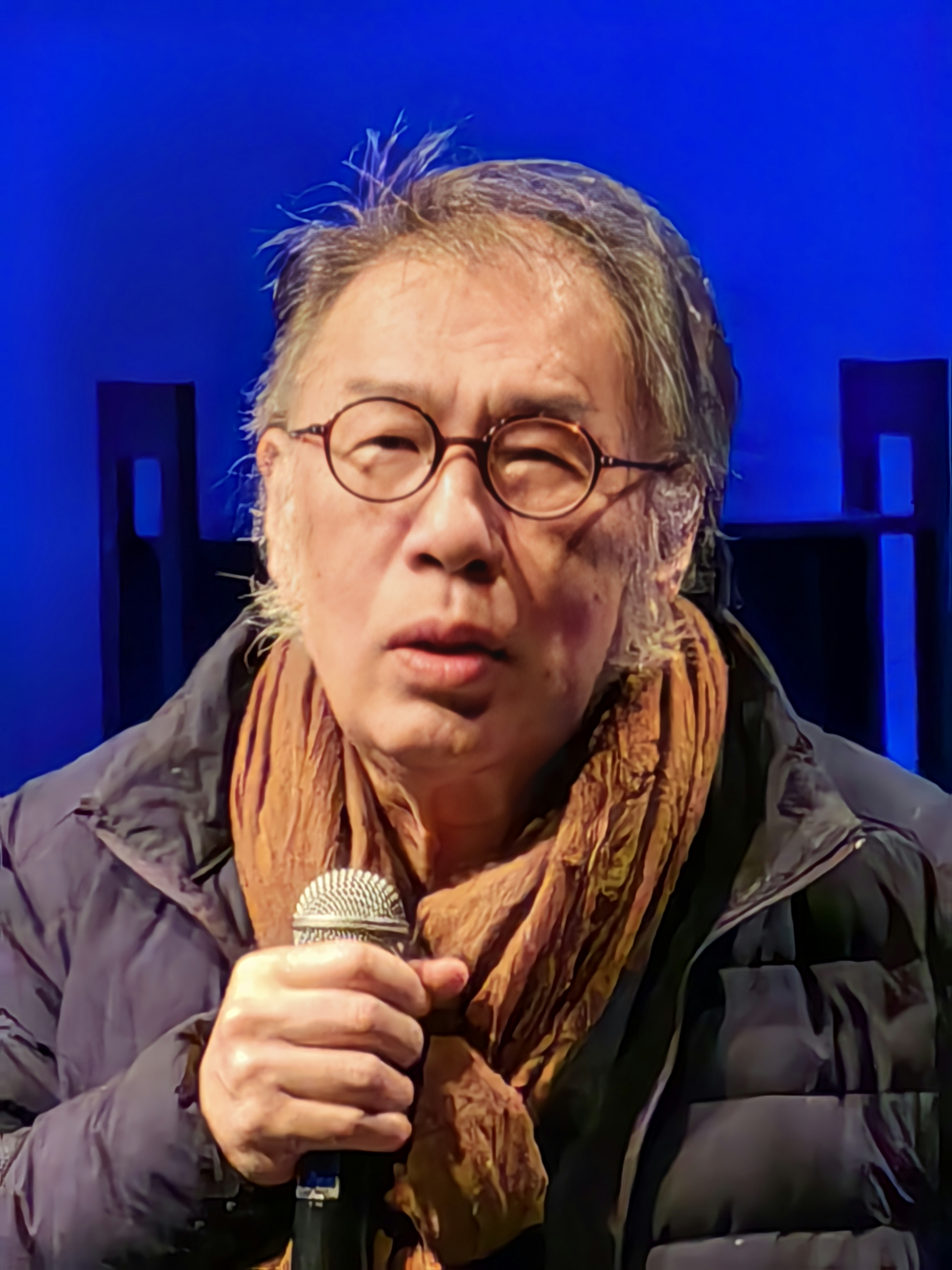
- Xi Chuan in January, 2024
- Born: Xi Chuan (西川); 1963 (age 62–63); Xuzhou, Jiangsu, China
- Education: Peking University
- Writing career
- Pen name: Liu Jun (刘军)

Xi Chuan (Chinese: 西川; born 1963), pen name of Liu Jun (Chinese: 刘军), is a poet, essayist, and translator. He is considered one of the most influential and celebrated contemporary Chinese poets. An author of experimental poetry and editor of underground poetry journals, his poems have been said to "carry a sense of the world’s plentitude and of the world’s puzzlement." In addition to his poetry, he has published two essay volumes, one book of criticism, a play, and translations of works by Pound, Borges, and Miłosz, and others.

Xi Chuan was born in Xuzhou, Jiangsu province and raised in Beijing. He attended a foreign-languages school for diplomats, an unusual opportunity at a time when most schools were closed. At Beijing University, he wrote a senior thesis on Ezra Pound's translations of Chinese poetry, earning an English degree. That's when he adopted his pen name, Xi Chuan (meaning "West Stream"). After college, he worked as a magazine editor for Huangqiu (Globus) and launched Qingxiang (Tendency), an independent literary journal that ran from 1988 until it was shut down in 1992, after only 3 issues. From 1990 to 1995, he was one of the editors of the unofficial magazine Modern Han Poetry. He also acted in Jia Zhangke's 2000 underground film Platform.

Xi gained recognition in the period following the Misty Poets in the late 1980s, in the early period of the reform and opening up. In 1989, two of his closest friends, both poets who had attended Beijing University, died: Hai Zi committed suicide on March 26, aged twenty-five, and Luo Yihe died from a cerebral hemorrhage, aged twenty-eight, on May 31. (Xi later published Hai Zi's works posthumously in 1997.) Following these deaths and the failure of the Tiananmen Square protests that year, he barely wrote for two years. This break took his poetry from "condensed, numinous lyricism" combining classical Chinese influences with Western modernism to "meditative, expansive prose poems that dismantled the aestheticism and musicality of his previous self".

He teaches classical and modern Chinese literature at the Central Academy of Fine Arts and lives in Beijing, China. Before that, he had taught Western literature in Chinese translation and introductory English. He has held appointments at universities outside China like New York University and the University of Victoria. He has won prizes in China, Germany, and from UNESCO.

== Awards ==
- Modern Chinese Poetry Award, 1994
- Lu Xun Prize for Literature, 2001
- Zhuang Zhongwen Prize for Literature, 2003

== Selected publications ==
- Chinese Roses (Zhongguo de meigui, 1991)
- A Fictitious Family Tree (Xugou de jiapu,1997)
- A Secret Convergence (Yinmi de huihe, 1997)
- The Poetry of Xi Chuan (Xi Chuan shi xuan, 1997, reprinted as Xi Chuan de shi in 1999)
- Roughly Speaking (Dayi ruci, 1997)
- Selected Poems of Xi Chuan,1986-1996 (2002)
- Depths and Shallowness (Shenqian, 2006)
- Personal Preferences (Geren haowu, 2008)
- Notes on the Mosquito, translated by Lucas Klein into English, 2012
- The Three from Peking University: Haizi, Luo Yihe, and Xi Chuan , Delufa Press, Rome (2025) translated by Francesco De Luca into Italian
