= The Secret of Heaven =

Trilogy of Chinese novels written by Cao Shui

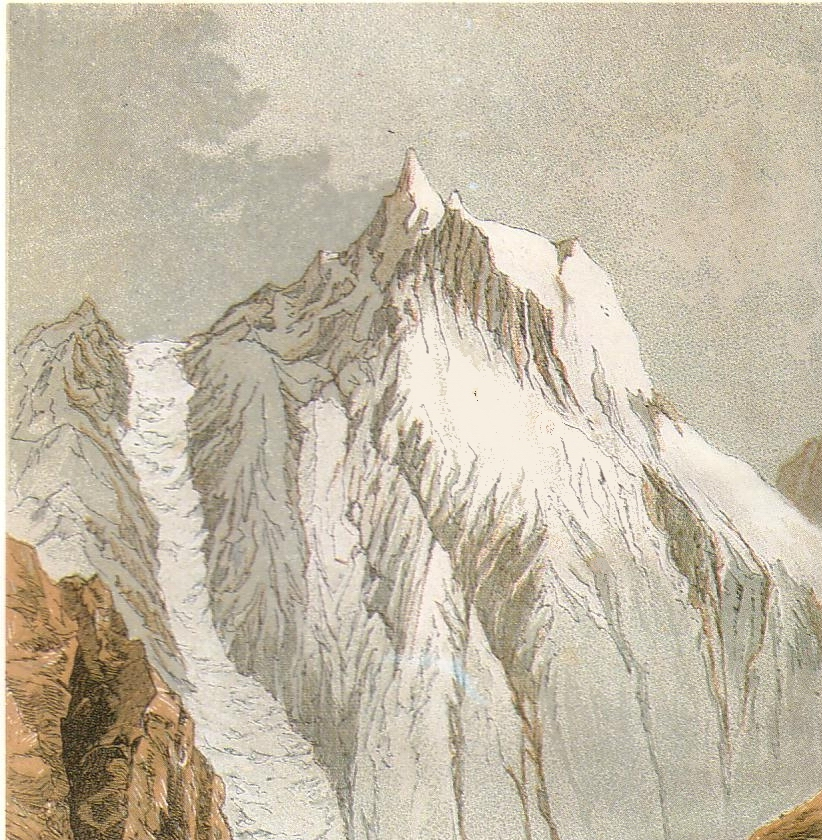
Illustration of the Kunlun Mountains, which the trilogy is named after

The Secret of Heaven, (Chinese: 昆仑秘史, "the secret history of Kunlun") also known as The Secret History of Kunlun, is a trilogy of Chinese language novels written by Cao Shui. Its story focuses around the Kunlun Shan, the important mountain-range of Chinese mythology, as the location of the world's original spiritual homeland where a new generation of Chinese Manichaeism (摩尼教 Móníjiào) inspires the protagonist's mission to bring about the salvation of humanity. The trilogy has received positive reviews from critics.

The Secret of Heaven follows its protagonist, Long Hao, during his journeys across Eurasia as he seeks to understand the ultimate mystery of the world, venturing into lands such as Tibet, India, Judea, Xinjiang, Ancient Egypt, Ancient Greece, and Persia. The story also follows the history of Manichaeism, from its beginnings in the Sassanid Empire (present-day Iraq) to its transcontinental spread. The later books in the trilogy also involve the Tower of Babel (the author, Cao Shui, is also known by the hao: "Lord of Tower of Babel") and the Mayan Civilization of Central America. The trilogy’s Eurasian setting and the region’s importance as the axis mundi of world cultures was inspired by Shui’s travels through Tibet and Xinjiang, which he started after resigning from an editorial position in Xining.

== Novels ==
- The Secret of Heaven I: The Axis of Time (2010).
- The Secret of Heaven II: The Chinese Royal Jade Seal and the Roman Imperial Diamond Crown (2011).
- The Secret of Heaven III: The Tower of Babel Is Mayan Pyramid (2016)
