= Qinghai University for Nationalities =

University in Xining, Qinghai, China

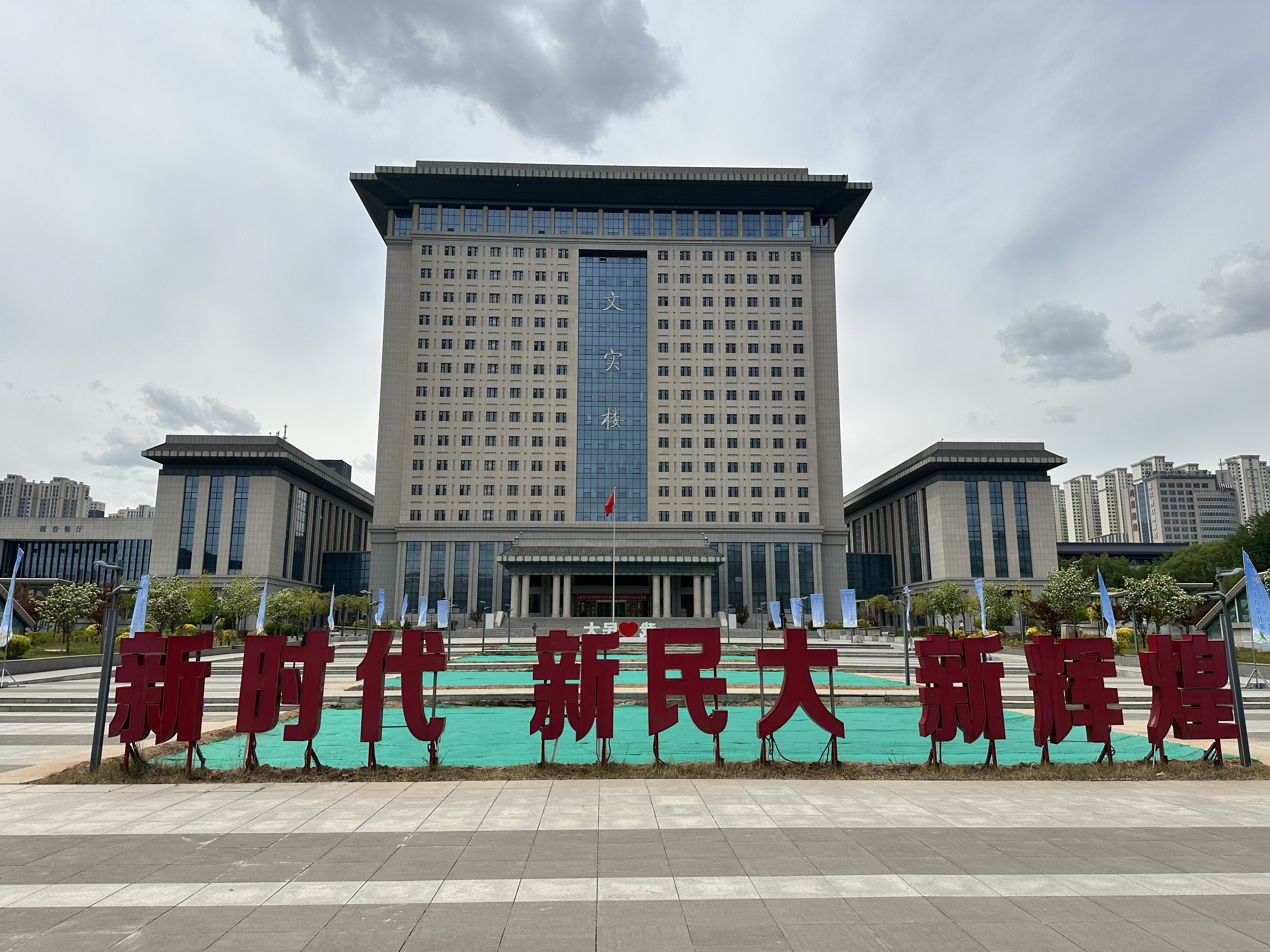
Qinghai University for Nationalities

Qinghai University for Nationalities (simplified Chinese: 青海民族大学; traditional Chinese: 青海民族大學; pinyin: Qīnghǎi Mínzú Dàxúe) is a university in Xining, Qinghai, China. It was established in December 1949 and was Qinghai's earliest university of higher education.
