= Nurduran Duman =

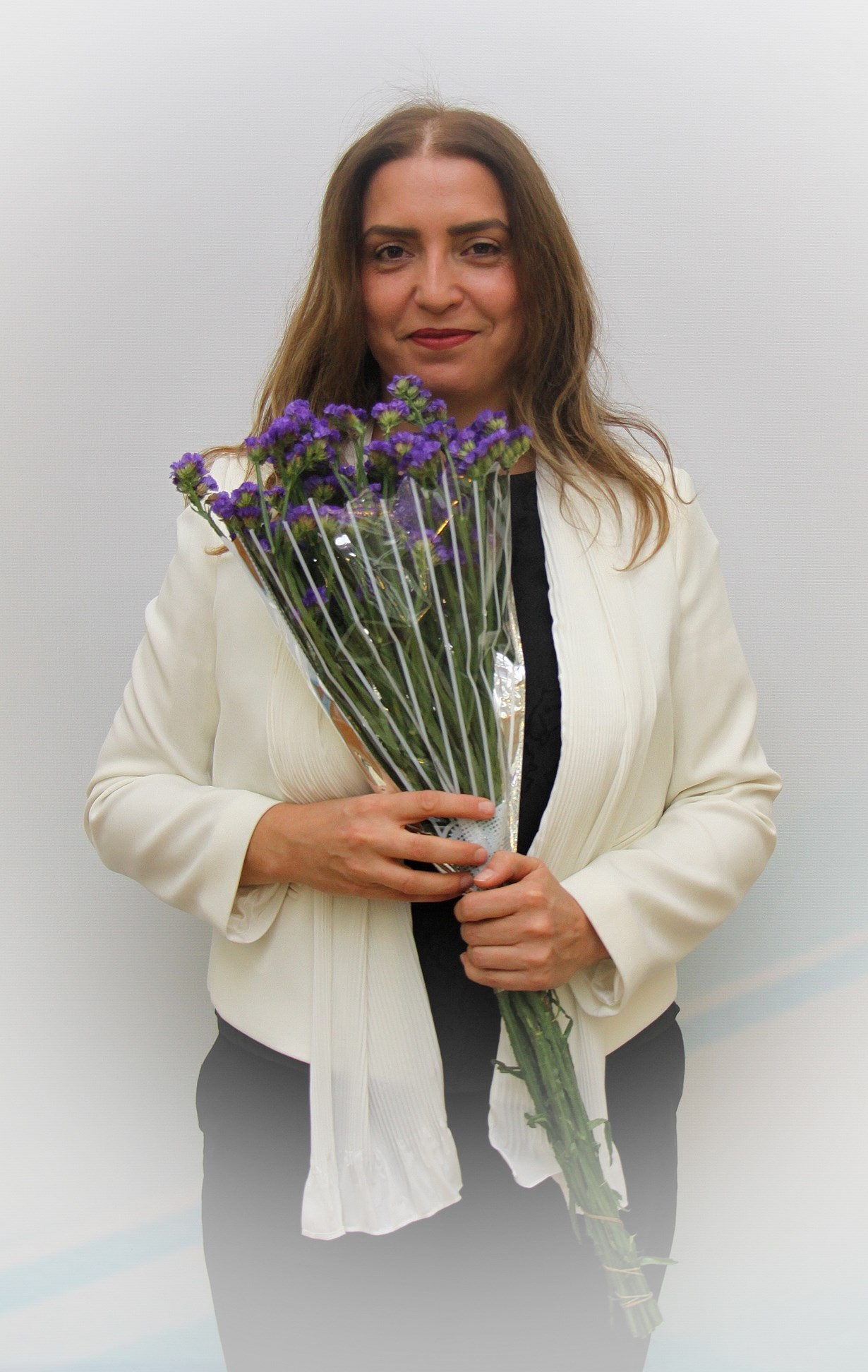
Nurduran Duman (Beijing – November 2017), photo by J.Pijarowski

Nurduran Duman (born 23 October 1974, in Çan-Çanakkale) is a Turkish poet, writer, translator, editor, culture & art journalist.

Nurduran Duman is a Turkish poet and playwright who lives in Istanbul. She wrote her first poem when she was 8 years old. When she was 9, she promised herself that in the future she would be a writer. She liked poetry, so she became a poet. Pursuing her passion for the sea, she received a degree as an Ocean Engineer and Naval Architect from the Istanbul Technical University. And, she's a columnist in one of the most prestigious newspapers of Turkiye, Cumhuriyet. She is also a member of the Turkish PEN.

== Life ==
Her books include Yenilgi Oyunu, the 2005 Cemal Sureya Poetry Award winner, and Mi Bemol. Semi Circle, a chapbook of her poems translated into English, was published in the United States in 2016, and "Selected Poems" (2017, Macedonian-English-Turkish) in Macedonia, "Selected Poems" (2019, Dutch-English-Turkish) in Belgium. Her poetry collection "Steps of Istanbul" (2019, Chinese-English-Turkish) was published in China in 2019, and was awarded as "The Poetry Collection of the Year of the Second Boao International Poetry Award". She featured in the #internationalwomensday2018 (#IWD18) Modern Poetry in Translation (MPT) list of ten women poets in translation from all over the World in 2018. (http://modernpoetryintranslation.com/ten-women-poets-in-translation-for-international-womens-day-2018/). Her poems also have been translated into Finnish, Chinese, Spanish, Azerbaijani Turkish, Bulgarian, Romanian, Slovak, French, German, Occitan, Macedonian, and Italian etc. The poem "act" for Alexandre Hollan's painting, she wrote upon request of Paul Valéry Museum in France, was published in the book of museum "Peinture et Poésie (Painting and Poetry)”. She is a poet included in the European poetry platform, Versopolis.

Individual translations of her poems have been published in Gallerie (India), Colorado Review, Interim, Faultline, Eleven Eleven, Asymptote, and other international journals. Recently, Duman was featured in the American art-literature magazine BRN with an interview conducted by Victor Hernandez Cruz, poet and Chancellor of the Academy of American Poets. Her article about the relationship between world peace and literary translation "Translation of Literature Means Peace" was originally written in English and appeared in the Finnish magazine Kaltio, translated into Finnish by Paavo J. Heinonen.

Duman also actively translates literature into Turkish. She translated Alma Alexander's book The Secret of Jin-shei, published in Turkey in 2007. Her poems, translations (poems and stories), poetic articles, book reviews and interviews with foreign writers (e.g. Eileen Gunn, Karen Joy Fowler, Yiyun Li, Anna Tambour, Monica Arac de Nyeko, etc.) have been published in numerous magazines and newspapers. She has also translated the poems of Anne Sexton, Sara Teasdale, Edna St. Vincent Millay, and Sylvia Plath.

Duman was elected as a board member of the Writers Syndicate of Turkiye and is an active member of Turkish PEN. She presented the literature programme 'Yazın Küresi – Sphere of Literature' and the children literature programme 'Kitap Hazinesi – Treasure of the Book' for radio and television. She has also been involved in many theatre activities as an actress, director throughout her career, and as a playwright nowadays. Her play "Before the Fly" was accepted into the repertoire of Turkish State Theaters. She teaches the course "Sociological Analysis in Turkish Literature" at Bahçeşehir University and she moderates literature activities as a curator in various platforms. She curated two events in Istanbul in 2019, in the name of the World Poetry Movement. Duman actively participates in a wide range of international literary events.

She is giving creative writing lessons and poetry lesson in Metot Sanat Academy.

== Awards ==
- Cemal Süreya Poetry Awards for Yenilgi Oyunu
- "Steps of Istanbul" (2019, Chinese-English-Turkish) was published in China in 2019, and was awarded as "The Poetry Collection of the Year of the Second Boao International Poetry Award"

== Literary works ==
=== Books ===
- Yenilgi Oyunu (The Defeat Game) (Poetry, 2006, Istanbul; Komşu Publishing, Yasakmeyve Books)
- İstanbul’la Bakışmak, Salacak (Exchanging Glances With Istanbul, Salacak) (Prose, 2010, Istanbul, Heyamola Publishing)
- Mi Bemol (Mi Bemol) (Poetry, 2012, Istanbul, Noktürn Publishing)

=== Translations of her works ===
- Semi Circle, (a chapbook of translations of the poet published by Goodmorning Menagerie in USA in January 2016)
- Selected Poems for Versopolis (Poetry, 2017, Turkish-Macedonian-English, published by Struga Poetry Evenings)
- Steps of Istanbul(Poetry,2019, Turkish-Chinese-English, translated by Cao Shui)

=== Book translations ===
- Jin-shei Kız Kardeşlik Sırları (The Secret of Jin-shei) (2006, İstanbul, Writer: Alma Alexander, Literatür Publishing)
