= Hai Zi =

Chinese poet (1964–1989)

- 査海生
- Born: Zha Haisheng; March 24, 1964; Huaining County, Anhui, China
- Died: March 26, 1989 (aged 25); Shanhaiguan District, Qinhuangdao, Hebei, China
- Citizenship: China
- Education: Peking University
- Occupations: Poet, editor
- Employer: China University of Political Science and Law
- Writing career
- Pen name: 海子 (Hai Zi)
- Language: Mandarin Chinese
- Years active: 1979–1989
- Period: Contemporary (20th century)
- Genre: Pastoral poetry
- Subjects: Village life; nature; motherland; love; death
- Notable works: Facing the Sea, with Spring Blossoms (面朝大海，春暖花开), other
- Notable awards: Shiyue Magazine Prize (1988)
- Movements: Great Poetry Movement, Misty Poets

Hai Zi (Chinese: 海子; March 24, 1964 – March 26, 1989) is the pen name of the Chinese poet Zha Haisheng (查海生). He was one of the most famous poets in Mainland China after the Cultural Revolution. He died on the evening of March 26, 1989 by suicide, lying in front of a train in Shanhaiguan at the age of 25.

== Biography ==
Zha Haisheng was born in an agricultural family of Zhawan, a small village in Anhui Province. He spent his childhood in traditional Chinese rural areas when the whole country was involved in the Cultural Revolution. In 1979, he was enrolled in Peking University at the age of 15. He began to write poems as a student in early 1980s, building a strong friendship with the two poets Xi Chuan and Luo Yihe. After graduation, he worked in China University of Political Science and Law. He kept sending his own poems written in an extremely dull environment of life to different newspapers and publishers but was hardly accepted. He remained unknown to common readers until his death.

Hai Zi was fascinated with Tibetan culture and Qigong in his last years. He ended his life by lying in front of a train not far from Shanhaiguan near his 25th birthday. A bag with a Bible, a book of selected stories by Joseph Conrad, Walden by Henry David Thoreau, and The Kon-Tiki Expedition by Thor Heyerdahl was found beside his body. His death is now regarded as an important event in modern Chinese literature with some suggesting it symbolizes "the sacrifice of the agricultural civilization".

In a writing two days before his death, Zha alleged that two people (Chang Yuan and Chang's wife Sun Ge) involved in researching special capacities of the human body (i.e., paranormal abilities), had used "Daoist witchcraft" to make him hear voices. Zha also wrote, "If I'm struck down by sudden death, schizophrenia, or suicide, the blame lies with them. They must be held criminally responsible."

== Legacy ==
Hai Zi has become one of the most quoted poets after the New Culture Movement. His mystical life and death remain an important topic of Chinese literature and society. He has gained a cult following, largely involving young people from all over China since the 1990s.

Hai Zi's poem Facing the Sea, with Spring Blossoms is inferred and mentioned several times in the Hong Kong movie McDull, Prince de la Bun.

Many coastal places of China are regarded as the one described in the poem Facing the Sea, with Spring Blossoms. But according to some research about the life of the poet, the beach of Xichong in Shenzhen is the most probable place.

== Works ==
Hai Zi wrote several long poems, "choral operas" and countless short poems in his brief life. His style is generally described as "anachronism". Many of his short poems contain symbolic images like Land, Sea and Wheat field and recall the ideals of the ancient Chinese pastoral poet Tao Yuanming.

The theme of nostalgia for the village life of his childhood, love for nature makes Hai Zi related to the Russian well-known poet Sergei Yesenin. Hai Zi himself wrote a cycle of poems "Poet Yesenin", in which he directly calls himself "Chinese Yesenin" as the reincarnation-like, which has become a popular cliché in works devoted to the personality of the poet.

Hai Zi was influenced by Western philosophy and arts, especially Nietzsche and Van Gogh. The strong sense of mysticism in his works is an important characteristic which turned him into a unique figure of Chinese literature.

Some of his poems have been translated into English. A bilingual book of his poems Over Autumn Rooftops, translated by Dan Murphy, was published in 2010 by Host Publications. A new bilingual book, Ripened Wheat: Selected Poems of Hai Zi, translated by Ye Chun, was out from the Bitter Oleander Press in 2015. In Italy, Del Vecchio Editore celebrated the 30th anniversary of Haizi’s death publishing, for the first time in Italian, a selection of 80 poems ("Un uomo felice", 2019) translated by Francesco De Luca. In 2025, Delufa Press published The Three from the University of Peking: Haizi, Luo Yihe, and Xi Chuan, a celebratory publication that brings together the three poets for the first time.

=== Short poems ===
Hai Zi's short poems are his most popular works. Some of them are now classics of 20th-century Chinese literature and are quoted frequently.

- Asian Copper (《亚洲铜》)
- The Sun of Arles (《阿尔的太阳》)
- The Four Sisters (《四姐妹》)
- To the Night (《黑夜的献诗》)
- Facing the Sea, with Spring Blossoms (《面朝大海，春暖花开》)
- Motherland, or Dream as a Horse (《祖国，或以梦为马》)
- Spring, Ten Hai Zis (《春天，十个海子》)

=== Long poems and other works ===
- Legend (《传说》)
- The River (《河流》)
- But Water, Water (《但是水、水》)
- Messiah (《弥赛亚》)
- Six Mysterious Stories (《神秘故事六篇》)

=== Selected Poems in translation ===
- "Mute Back" tr. Ye Chun
- "Dunhuang"
- "Poetry Book"
- "Song: Light Strikes the Ground"
- "Wind Cup: A Bouquet of Love Poems"
- "Thinking of a Past Life"

== See also ==
- Chinese poetry
- Misty Poets
