= List of Chinese-language poets =

The following is a list of Poets who wrote or write much of their poetry in the languages of China.

== A ==
- Ai Qing

== B ==
- Bai Juyi or Bo Juyi
- Consort Ban
- Ban Gu (32–92 A.D.)
- Bei Dao
- Bei Ling
- Bian Zhilin

== C ==
- Cai Wenji
- Cai Yong
- Cao Cao 曹操
- Cao Pi
- Cao Zhi
- Cen Shen
- Chen Sanli
- Chen Minghua
- Chen Nianxi
- Chen Yinke
- Chen Zi'ang
- Chūgan Engetsu (1300–1375), Japanese poet who wrote in Chinese, a figure in "Japanese Literature of the Five Mountains" (literature in Chinese written in Japan)
- Cui Hao, Tang dynasty poet

== D ==
- Dai Biaoyuan
- Dai Wangshu
- Dong Xiaowan
- Du Fu 杜甫, the "Poet Sage"
- Du Mu (803-852), Tang poet, official
- Duo Duo

== E ==
- Emperor Xuanzong of Tang

== F ==
- Fei Ye 菲野
- Fenggan, "Big Stick", a legendary Buddhist monk. He was an associate of the famous legendary poets Han Shan and Shih Te.

== G ==
- Gao Qi, Ming dynasty poet
- Gidō Shūshin
- Gong Zizhen
- Gu Cheng
- Gu Taiqing
- Guan Daosheng
- Guo Moruo, poet, historian, archaeologist

== H ==
- Hai Zi 海子, modern mystic poet
- Han Yu 韩愈
- Han Shan, "Cold Mountain"
- He Zhizhang
- Huang Tingjian 黄庭堅 (1045–1105)
- Huarui Furen
- Huang Zongxi

== I ==
- Ido Reizan

== J ==
- Jao Tsung-I
- Ji Xian (b. 1903), leading Taiwanese modernist
- Jia Dao 贾岛
- Jia Yi
- Jiang Yan

== K ==
- Ke Yan
- Kokan Shiren
- Kong Shangren

== L ==
- Leung Ping-kwan
- Li E
- Li Bai (Li Po), the "Poet Immortal"
- Li He
- Li Qiao
- Li Qingzhao
- Li Shangyin
- Li Yu (Li Houzhu)
- Liang Desheng
- Liang Huang
- Lin Huiyin
- Liu Yuxi
- Liu Zongyuan
- Lu Guimong
- Lu Ji
- Lu You
- Lu Yu
- Lu Zhaolin
- Lu Zhi
- Luo Binwang

== M ==
- Ma Rong
- Mang Ke
- Mao Zedong
- Mei Yaochen, Song dynasty poet
- Meng Haoran, Tang dynasty poet
- Mi Heng
- Mu Dan

== N ==
- Natsume Sōseki, Japan's modern composer of Chinese poetry
- Nalan Xingde
- Nie Gannu

== O ==
- Ouyang Xiu

== P ==
- Pan Yue
- Pan Lei
- Pei Di
- Pi Rixiu

== Q ==
- Qian Zhongshu
- Qin Zihao (1902–1963), leading Taiwanese modernist
- Qiu Jin
- Qiu Wei
- Qu Yuan, State of Chu poet
- Quan Deyu
- Qiao Ji

== R ==
- Ruan Ji

== S ==
- Shangguan Wan'er (上官婉儿)
- Shen Shanbao (沈善宝)
- Shen Yue (沈约)
- Shen Quanqi (沈佺期)
- Shi Zhi"index finger" (食指，郭路生)
- Shih-Te, "Pick-Up" (拾得)
- Shih-wu, "Stonehouse" (石屋)
- Shivaza Iasyr, wrote in the Dungan (Soviet Hui people) dialect (雅斯尔·十娃子 or 亚瑟尔·十娃子)
- Shu Ting (舒婷)
- Sima Xiangru (司马相如)
- Song Yu (宋玉)
- Su Shi (苏轼)
- Su Xiaoxiao (苏小小)
- Shang Ting (商挺)

== T ==
- Tao Qian, also known as Tao Yuanming

== W ==
- Wang Anshi
- Wang Bo
- Wang Can
- Wang Changling
- Wang Rong
- Wang Wei (Tang dynasty), the "Poet Buddha"
- Wang Wei (17th-century poet)
- Wang Yi-Ch'eng, poet
- Wang Yun (Qing dynasty)
- Wei Yuan
- Wei Zhuang
- Wen Tingyun
- Wen Yiduo
- Wu Cheng'en, Ming novelist, poet
- Wu Jiaji
- Wu Zao

== X ==
- Xi Chuan
- Xi Kang (or Ji Kang)
- Xi Xi
- Xiao Gang (Emperor Jianwen of Liang)
- Xie Lingyun
- Xie Tiao
- Xie Xiangnan
- Xin Qiji
- Xu Lizhi
- Lady Xu Mu
- Xu Zhi Mo 1895–1931, melancholic poet of early 20th century
- Xu Zihua
- Xue Tao 768-831

== Y ==
- Yang Jiong
- Yan Li
- Yang Lian
- Yang Wanli
- Yang Xiong
- Yao Shouzhong
- Yao Sui
- John Yau
- Chia-ying Yeh
- Yu Xin
- Yu Xiuhua
- Yu Xuanji
- Yuan Hongdao
- Yuan Zhen
- Yuan Zhongdao

== Z ==
- Zhai Yongming
- Zhang Heng
- Zhang Hua
- Zhang Ji (poet from Hubei)
- Zhang Ji (poet from Jiangnan)
- Zhang Jiuling
- Zhang Xu
- Zhang Yaotiao (Tang Geji poet)
- Zhao Luanluan (Yuan dynasty poet)
- Zhao Luorui
- Zhang Zhidong
- Zheng Min
- Zheng Xiaoqiong
- Zheng Yunduan
- Zhu Shuzhen
- Zhuo Wenjun
- Zuo Si

== See also ==
- Chinese poetry
- Song Dynasty poets (list)
- List of Three Hundred Tang Poems poets
- Tang Dynasty poets (list)
- List of Chinese authors
- List of Chinese women writers
- List of Hong Kong poets
