= Jintian (journal) =

Chinese literary journal

Jintian (Chinese: 今天; lit. 'Today') is the title of a Chinese literary journal. Founded in 1978, it was the first non-official literary journal in the People's Republic of China since the 1950s. It ran for nine issues until it was censored in 1980. It was revived in 1990.

== About ==
Jintian was created in 1978 by Mang Ke, Bei Dao and others, and was first distributed on and around Democracy Wall in Beijing. It was instrumental in bringing the Misty Poets into the open, publishing work by Bei Dao, Duo Duo, Shu Ting, Yang Lian and others. It ran for nine issues and published four books (poetry by Mang Ke, Bei Dao, and Jiang He, and a novella by Ai Shan [pen-name of Bei Dao]). It also ran two poetry readings (on 8 April and 21 October 1979), and two exhibitions of The Stars, the first non-official painters.

In 1990 Jintian was revived overseas, with Bei Dao as editor, and initially published from Stockholm. It is now an online journal, featuring writing in Chinese.

== Translations into English ==
Some of the poems, short stories and essays first published in Jintian have been translated into English, notably in the series Chinese Writing Today, the first two volumes published by the Wellsweep Press, in the UK, and the third volume published by the Zephyr Press in the USA. The Jintian Series of Contemporary Literature is published by Zephyr Press, in the USA.

Chinese Writing Today

- Under Sky Under Ground. Chinese Writing Today 1, ed. by Henry Y.H. Zhao and John Cayley, Wellsweep Press, London, 1994 (with foreword by Jonathan D. Spence) - this contains fiction by Haizi, Janet Tan, Henry Y.H. Zhao, Nan Fang, Ai Yan, Jane Ying Zha, Duo Duo and Du Ma; poetry by Bei Dao, Duo Duo, Yang Lian, Gu Cheng, Zhang Zhen, Meng Lang, Zhang Zao, Bai Hua, Daxian, Li Li, Dean Lü, Hong Ying, Daozi, and Zi An; memoirs of underground literature by Zhang Langlang, A Cheng, Li Tuo, and Zhong Ming; belles lettres by Song Lin, Yan Li, Zhang Chengzhi, and Gu Xiaoyang; and criticism by Henry Y.H. Zhao and You Yi.
- Abandoned Wine, Chinese Writing Today 2, ed. by Henry Y.H. Zhao and John Cayley, Wellsweep Press, London, 1996 (with foreword by Gary Snyder).
- Fissures. Chinese Writing Today 3, ed. by Yiheng Zhao (Henry Y.H. Zhao), Yanbing Chen and John Rosenwald, Zephyr Press, 2000.

The Jintian Series of Contemporary Literature (published by Zephyr Press)

- Mirror by Zhang Zao, tr. Fiona Sze-Lorrain (forthcoming 2025)
- Floral Mutter by Ya Shi, tr. Nick Admussen (2020)
- Sunday Sparrows by Song Ling, tr. Jami Proctor Xu (2019)
- October Dedications by Mang Ke, tr. Lucas Klein, with Huang Yibing and Jonathan Stalling (2017)
- Something Crosses My Mind by Wang Xiaoni, tr. Eleanor Goodman (2014)
- I Can Almost See Clouds of Dust by Yu Xiang, tr. Fiona Sze-Lorrain (2014)
- Canyon in the Body by Lan Lan, tr. Fiona Sze-Lorrain (2014)
- Double Shadows by Ouyang Jianghe, tr. Austin Woerner (2012)
- A Phone Call From Dalian by Han Dong, ed. by Nicky Harman (2012)
- Wind Says by Bai Hua, tr. Fiona Sze-Lorrain (2012)
- The Changing Room by Zhai Yongming, tr. Andrea Lingenfelter (2011)
- Flash Cards by Yu Jian, tr. Wang Ping and Ron Padgett (2010)
