= The Big Red Book of Modern Chinese Literature =

2016 Chinese literature anthology

The Big Red Book of Modern Chinese Literature: Writings from the Mainland in the Long Twentieth Century
- The Big Red Book of Modern Chinese Literature
- Editor: Yunte Huang
- Language: English
- Genre: Poetry and urban fiction anthology
- Published: 2016
- Publisher: W. W. Norton & Company
- Publication place: New York City, United States
- Pages: 624
- ISBN: 978-0-393-35380-8

The Big Red Book of Modern Chinese Literature: Writings from the Mainland in the Long Twentieth Century is an anthology of Chinese literature edited by Yunte Huang and published in 2016 by W. W. Norton & Company. Huang, a professor of English at the University of California, Santa Barbara, described the book as a "search for the soul of modern China" in the introduction.

== Contents ==
The book is 600 pages long and has works spanning about 100 years until its publishing date, with almost 50 authors represented. The works were translated by multiple people.

At the beginning of the anthology, Huang reveals that copyright conflicts prevented the inclusion of works that would have otherwise been a part of the anthology, specifically Love in a Fallen City by Eileen Chang and Fortreess Besieged by Qian Zhongshu.

The works were placed in three sections: the Republican Era which spans from 1911 to 1949 and includes works from the New Culture Movement; the Revolutionary Era, spanning 1949 to 1976; and the Post-Mao Era, which has works since 1976. The portions of the book post 1990 are heavily focused on poetry and have less emphasis on urban fiction.

=== Part One: 1911–1949 works ===
- Preface to Call to Arms and A Madman's Diary by Lu Xun
- A Maze of Stars and Spring Water (1923, excerpts) by Bing Xin
- Miss Sophia's Diary (1927, excerpts) by Ding Ling
- Rainbow (excerpts) by Mao Dun
- Family (1933, excerpts) by Ba Jin
- Border Town (1934, excerpts) by Shen Congwen
- My Country and My People (excerpts) by Lin Yutang
- Rickshaw (1937, excerpts) by Lao She
- An excerpt of Tales of Hulan River by Xiao Hong
- Other poetry and works by Mao Dun, Bian Zhilin, Zhou Zuoren, Dai Wangshu, Wen Yiduo, Xu Zhimo, Zhu Ziqing, He Haiming, Yu Dafu, Li Jinfa, Xu Dishan, Liu Bannong, Guo Moruo, Hu Shih

=== Part Two: 1949–1976 works ===
- The Legend of the Red Lantern (1960s Chinese opera)
- Changsha (1925), Mount Liupan (1935), Snow (1936), Quotations from Chairman Mao Tse-tung (1964, excerpts) by Mao Zedong
- Other works by Ai Qing, Wang Meng, Zhao Shuli

=== 1976–2016 works ===
- Red Sorghum (1986, excerpts) by Mo Yan
- Hut on the Mountain by Can Xue
- Raise the Red Lantern (1990, excerpts) by Su Tong
- Soul Mountain (1990, excerpts) by Gao Xingjian
- Nothing to My Name (1986) by Ciu Jian
- Other poetry and writing by Xi Chuan, Zhang Zhao, Yu Xinqiao, Yu Hua, Chi Zijian, Yu Jian, Che Qianzi, Ma Yuan, Hai Zi, Zhai Yongming, Wang Anyi, Yang Lian, Liu Suola, Shu Ting, Bei Dao, Gu Cheng

== Reception ==
Julia Lovell of The New York Times wrote that "it’s heartening to see a serious publisher, one whose list is geared to the general reader, invest in an anthology that manages to combine the established canon with less-well-known selections." She argued that the book should have included works by Eileen Chang, and that male writers were represented too heavily in this anthology of modern Chinese writing.
