= Shu Ting =

Chinese poet (born 1952)

- 舒婷
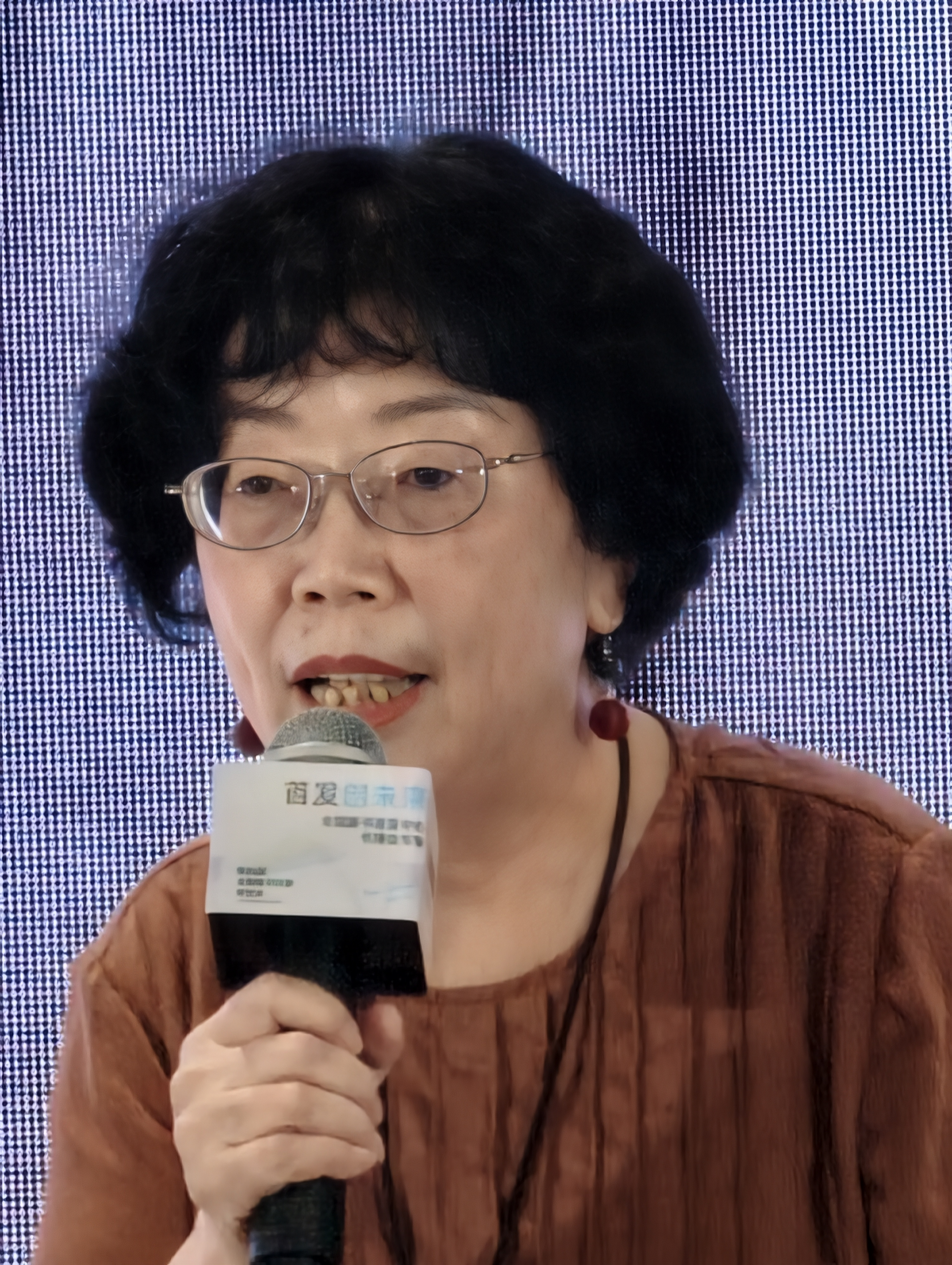
- Shu Ting at 2026 National Book Expo
- Born: Gong Peiyu; 1952 (age 73–74); Jinjiang, Fujian
- Occupation: Poet
- Spouse: Zhongyi Chen
- Writing career
- Language: Chinese
- Period: Contemporary
- Genre: Poetry
- Movement: Misty Poets

Shu Ting (Chinese: 舒婷; pinyin: Shū Tíng; Pe̍h-ōe-jī: Su-têng; born 1952 in Jinjiang, Fujian) is the pen name of Gong Peiyu (simplified Chinese: 龚佩瑜; traditional Chinese: 龔佩瑜; pinyin: Gōng Pèiyú; Pe̍h-ōe-jī: Kéng Pōe-jû), a modern Chinese poet associated with the Misty Poets. She began writing poetry in the 1970s and later had her works published.

== Life ==
Shu Ting grew up in Jinjiang, Fujian. However, as a teenager her father was accused of ideological aberrance and moved her to the countryside. Upon her return to Fujian, she took up job positions at a cement factory, a textile mill, and a lightbulb factory.

She began to write poetry and, in 1979, published her first poem and was one of the first people to have her work published in the underground journal Jīntiān (Today). She became part of the group known as the Misty Poets. Other Misty Poets include Bei Dao, Gu Cheng, Fei Ye, and Duo Duo. The journal, Jīntiān ran from 1978 to 1980 until Deng Xiaoping, a new Chinese statesman halted the publication due to suspicions of ideological nonconformity.

In the early 1980s, she achieved prominence as the leading female representative of the Misty Poets. She was the only Misty Poet given official government support. Because of this she worked clandestinely with other poets such as Gu Cheng and Bei Dao. Her first collection, Shuangwei Chuan appeared in 1982, as did a joint-collection with Gu Cheng.

She married her husband Zhongyi Chen in 1982.

She was asked to join the official Chinese Writers' Association, and won the National Outstanding Poetry Award in 1981 and 1983.

During the "anti-spiritual pollution" movement that was launched in 1983, she, like other writers that were thought to be subversive by the state, was heavily criticized. Following this, she published two collections with poetry: Hui changge de yiweihua and Shizuniao.

== Works ==
- The mist of my heart: selected poems of Shu Ting, Translator William O'Donnell, Panda Books, 1995, ISBN 978-0-8351-3148-3
- Book: Shu Ting: Selected Poems (ed. by Eva Hung). Hong Kong: Renditions Paperbacks, 1994.
- Shu, Ting. Shuang Wei Chuan. Shanghai: Shanghai wen yi chu ban she, 1982. Print.

=== Writing style ===
Shu Ting's writing style is known to be very straightforward. Andrea Lingenfelter's describes Shu Ting in her review of Selected Poems. An Authorized Collection by Eva Hung: "her attitude [as] idealistic, patriotic, and yet apolitical. In terms of form, the poet takes few, if any, risks." Her work is also known to have somewhat of a feminine voice, characterized by a personal style. At the time it stood out because of the contrast of styles between what was being advanced by the government.

Many of her works were published during the Cultural Revolution and were scrutinized by the government, even if they did not have direct political references.

=== Anthology inclusions ===
- "Smoking People" (PDF). 39 (2). Beloit Poetry Journal. Winter 1988–1989. Archived from the original (PDF) on 2010-11-21.
- Czeslaw Milosz, ed. (1998). "Perhaps". A Book of Luminous Things: An International Anthology of Poetry. Houghton Mifflin Harcourt. ISBN 978-0-15-600574-6.
- Edward Morin; Fang Dai, eds. (1990). The Red azalea: Chinese poetry since the Cultural Revolution. Translated by Edward Morin; Fang Dai; Dennis Ding. University of Hawaii Press. p. 99. ISBN 978-0-8248-1320-8. "shu ting."
- William H. Roetzheim, ed. (2006). "Assembly Line". The Giant Book of Poetry. Level4Press Inc. ISBN 978-0-9768001-2-5.
- Barnstone, Tony, ed. (1993). Out of the Howling Storm: The New Chinese Poetry. University Press of New England. pp. 59–65. ISBN 0-8195-1210-9.

== See also ==
- Misty Poets
- Bei Dao
- Duo Duo
- Fei Ye
- Gu Cheng
- Yang Lian
