= America Award =

America Award may refer to:

- America Award in Literature
- Italy-USA Foundation's America Award
