= Yinchuan Poetry Prize =

Poetry award

Yinchuan International Prize for Poetry
- Native name: 银川国际诗歌奖
- Sponsored by: Zhang Shaohua (initial sponsor)
- Country: China
- Status: Active / Intermittent (Check status)

Yinchuan International Prize for Poetry is poetry award established in Yinchuan, China, to recognize international and Chinese language poets of exceptional talent.

It is given for a volume of poetry. The work may be written in Chinese or translated into Chinese from another language.

The Prize is associated with Yinchuan Poetry Festival, which included such well known and beloved poets as Duo Duo and Cai Tianxin as well as respected translators from European Languages into Chinese such as Li Li.

This $10,000 cash prize is awarded to the winning poet. The award was organized by Wang Xiping, poet and journalist, and sponsored by Zhang Shaohua, who provided 200,000 RMB to the poetry festival, prize, and banquet everyday throughout the festival.

== Yinchuan International Prize: Past Winners ==
- Ilya Kaminsky (Russia/USA)
- Li Cheng-en (China)
- Maryam Ala Amjadi (Iran)
- Jiang Kuo (Taiwan)
- Yang Dian (China)
- Li Li (Sweden)
