= Wang Yun =

Wang Yun may refer to:

- Wang Yun (Han dynasty) (137–192), bureaucrat during the late Han dynasty
- Wang Yun (Yuan dynasty) (1228–1304), poet of the Yuan dynasty
- Wang Yun (Qing dynasty) (1749–1819), poet of the Qing dynasty
- Wang Yun (footballer) (born 1983), Chinese footballer
