= Yu Jian =

Chinese poet and documentary film director (born 1954)

Yu Jian (Chinese: 于坚;), born 1954, is a Chinese poet, writer and documentary film director. He is a major figure among "The Third Generation Poets" that came after the Misty Poetry movement of the early 1980s. His work has been translated into Bulgarian, English, French, German, Dutch, Spanish, Italian, Swedish, Danish, and Japanese.

== Biography ==
Born in Kunming, China, on August 8, 1954, Yu Jian's schooling was interrupted in 1966 by the Cultural Revolution. He became a factory worker in 1969, where frequent power failures enabled him to read voraciously. He started writing poetry (free verse) at the age of twenty. He studied in the Department of Chinese Language and Literature, at Yunnan University, and was a literary activist, organising events and editing publications. His career as a published poet took off when his poem "6 Shangyi Street" was published in China's leading poetry journal Shikan in 1986. He published a controversial long poem File Zero in 1994, then a collection of travel sketches and impressions of daily life Notes from the Human World in 1999, and another long poem Flight in 2000.

== Honours and awards ==
- 2016: An English-language translation of File Zero was included in the Chinese literature anthology The Big Red Book of Modern Chinese Literature.
- 2010 - "Home", poem, in cooperation with Zhu Xiaoyang won Taiwan's 14th United Daily News New Poetry Prize (2010), Taiwan's Genesis Poetry Magazine Prize and the Lu Xun Literary Prize.
- 2003 - "Turquoise Bus Stop", documentary, was considered for the 2003 Amsterdam International Documentary Filmmaking Festival's Silver Wolf AwardHome (2010).
- The German edition of Yu Jian's poetry collection File Zero won the German Association for the Promotion of Asia, African and Latin American Literature's “World Experiences” Prize.

== Selected publications – translated into English ==
- "16", "50", "63", "84", "The Last Summer Storm", tr. George O’Connell and Diana Shi, in Atlanta Review xiv, 2 (Spring/Summer 2008).
- "A Beethoven Chronology" [贝多芬纪年], tr. Steve Bradbury, in Words without Borders (Dec. 2011).
- "Immanuel Kant", tr. Steve Bradbury, in Words without Borders (Dec. 2011).
- "File 0", tr. Maghiel van Crevel, in Renditions 56 (2001).
- Flash Cards, tr. by Wang Ping and Ron Padgett (St. Paul, MN: Zephyr Press, 2011)
- "Four Poems", tr. Simon Patton, in Renditions 46 (1996).
- "Poems" in Wang Ping, ed., New Generation: Poems from China Today (Brooklyn: Hanging Loose Press, 1999).
- "Short Pieces (Selections)", tr. Nicholas Kaldis, in Dirty Goat 24 (2011).
- "Small Town", tr. Simon Patton, in Chinese Literature Today 3, 1/2 (2013).
- "Two Poems" ["Fat man with a kind face…" and "Crows in black robes"], tr. John Crespi, in basalt 2, 1 (2007).
- "Two or Three Things from the Past", tr. Wang Ping and Ron Padgett, in Words Without Borders (Dec. 2004).

== Selected documentary films ==
- Turquoise Bus Stop (2003) was considered for the 2003 Amsterdam International Documentary Filmmaking Festival's Silver Wolf Award.
