= John Cayley =

Canadian pioneer of writing in digital media

- Born: John Cayley; July 20, 1956 (age 70); Ottawa, Ontario, Canada
- Known for: Digital Language Art, Poetry, Translation, Electronic Literature
- Notable work: windsound, riverIsland, translation, Image Generation, The Listeners, The Readers Project, Grammalepsy

John Howland Cayley (born 1956) is a Canadian pioneer of writing in digital media as well as a theorist of the practice, a poet, and a Professor of Literary Arts at Brown University (from 2007).

== Education ==
After moving to the United Kingdom in the late 1960s, Cayley went to secondary school in the south of England. He read for a degree in Chinese Studies at Durham University, leaving with a 2:1 in 1978.

== Career ==
While still a graduate student and UK-based translator and poet, between the late 1970s and mid 1990s, Cayley began to experiment with using programs and algorithms, coded for newly-accessible personal computers, to manipulate and generate poetic texts.

From 1986 to 1988 Cayley worked as a curator in the Chinese Section of the British Library and, during the same period, founded Wellsweep, an independent micro-press devoted to literary translation from Chinese, chiefly poetry. One of Cayley's early experiments with hypertext and poetry, a late 1990s collaboration with Chinese poet Yang Lian, is discussed in 'Making waves in world literature,' chapter 6 of Jacob Edmond's Make it the same: poetry in the age of global media.

Throughout his career, Cayley has created and developed a number of original formal techniques for the composition and display of digital language art: poetically motivated Markov chain text generation, dynamic text, self-altering text, transliteral morphing, ambient poetry, etc. In 2017, his lifelong contributions to the theory and practice of digital language art earned him the Electronic Literature Organization Marjorie C. Luesebrink Career Achievement Award. There are a number of discussions of both Cayley's theoretical contributions and certain of his works in Scott Rettberg's Electronic Literature. Katherine Hayles discusses Cayley's riverIsland in 'The Time of Digital Poetry: From Object to Event,' and Tong-King Lee devotes a large part of chapter 7 in his co-authored book, Translation and translanguaging to Cayley's translation.

In 2009, Cayley launched, with long-term collaborator, Daniel C. Howe, The Readers Project, 'an aesthetically-oriented system of software agents, designed to explore the culture of human reading.' This project is extensively discussed in Manuel Portela's Scripting Reading Motions.

Cayley's most recent work explores transactive synthetic language and led to his creation of a skill for the Amazon Echo, The Listeners.

== Works (selected) ==
- The Listeners. 2015. Digital language art as aurature in transactive synthetic language deployed using Amazon's Alexa Voice Services.
- The Readers Project. 2009. With Daniel C. Howe.
- translation. 2004. Interlingual ambient poetics.
- what we will have of what we are: something past. 2000. With Giles Perring, Douglas Cape and James Waite. Collaborative web-based broadband interactive drama.
- windsound. 1999. Dynamic text movie. Winner of the 2001 Electronic Literature Award for poetry.
- The Speaking Clock. 1995. Poetic generator that spells the time and names moments. Hypercard on disk. Johannes Maibaum produced a critical appreciation of The Speaking Clock for YouTube. Markku Eskelinen analyzes this work.

== Books, chapbooks, artists books (selected) ==
- Grammalepsy: essays on digital language art. London: Bloomsbury. 2018. ISBN 978-1-5013-3576-1.
- Image Generation: a reader. London: Veer Books. 2015. ISBN 978-1907088827.
- How It Is in Common Tongues. Providence: NLLF Press. 2012. ISBN 978-0948454301. With Daniel C. Howe. Limited edition conceptual literary artist's book.
- Tianshu: Passages in the Making of a Book. London: Bernard Quaritch. 2009. ISBN 978-0955085291. by John Cayley with Xu Bing and others, ed. Katherine Spears.

== Scholarship (selected) ==
- "The Advent of Aurature and the End of (Electronic) Literature"
- "Pentameters toward the Dissolution of Certain Vectoralist Relations"
- "Terms of Reference & Vectoralist Transgressions: Situating Certain Literary Transactions over Networked Services"
- "The Readers Project: Procedural Agents and Literary Vectors"
- "The Code Is Not the Text (Unless It Is the Text)"

== Recognition ==
- Electronic Literature Organization inaugural prize for Poetry 2001.
- Marjorie Luesebrink Career Achievement Award 2017.

== See also ==
- List of electronic literature authors, critics, and works
- Digital poetry
- E-book#History
- Electronic literature
- Hypertext fiction
- Interactive fiction
- Literatronica
