= Arthur Cooper (translator) =

British codebreaker and translator

Arthur Richard Valentine Cooper (1916–1988) was a British codebreaker, who became a translator of Chinese literature after retirement. He is best remembered for his translations of the Tang dynasty poets Li Bai and Du Fu, but is also known for his original research on the early Chinese script.

== Life ==
Arthur Richard Valentine Cooper was born to Anglo-Irish parents in 1916. He developed an early interest in languages, learning Icelandic before turning to Japanese and Chinese. He joined the Government Code and Cypher School (GC&CS) in 1938, and in 1939 he was sent out to Hong Kong to work at the Far East Combined Bureau, a GC&CS outpost which moved to Singapore after the outbreak of WWII. Cooper learnt Chinese and Japanese and stayed in Singapore almost until the British surrender. He and several colleagues had been monitoring Japanese wireless transmissions to give warning of Japanese air raids. They escaped on 11 February 1942 and made their way to Australia. There Cooper spent several months working at the Special Intelligence Bureau in Melbourne before returning to GC&CS, which had moved to Bletchley Park in the summer of 1939. He wrote a textbook of written Japanese for wartime use and taught Japanese at Bletchley Park. In 1947 he returned to Australia where he worked as a codebreaker seconded to the Australian government. In 1953 he returned to GC&CS, which had now been renamed GCHQ. He retired in 1968, and thereafter devoted himself to Chinese language and literature. His work On the Creation of the Chinese Script (1978) revealed great insight. He also taught, one of his students being Michael Loewe.

== Writings ==
- Li Po and Tu Fu: Poems Selected and Translated with an Introduction and Notes (Penguin Books, 1973)
- The creation of the Chinese script (London: China Society, 1978)
- Deep Woods' Business: Uncollected Translations from the Chinese (Wellsweep Press, 1990)
- The Other Greek: An Introduction to Chinese and Japanese Characters, Their History and Influence, Imre Galambos ed. (Brill, 2018)
