= Shao Fei =

Chinese artist

- 邵飞
- Born: 1954 (age 71–72)
- Education: Beijing Fine Art Academy
- Movement: Stars Art Group
- Spouse: Bei Dao

Shao Fei (Chinese: 邵飞; born 1954) is a contemporary Chinese female artist from Beijing. As a professional painter at the Central Academy of Fine Arts from 1976 and a prominent member of the Stars Art Group from 1979–80, Shao Fei combines the use of expressionism, fantastic and figurative art in her works. In China, she has influenced the contemporary art movement and eliminated artistic restrictions imposed on female artists.

== Life ==
=== Early life ===
Her mother, Shao Jingkun, was an oil painter and taught her guo hua technique at an early age.

At the age of sixteen, Shao Fei joined the PLA (People's Liberation Army) where she served in the forces from 1970-76. During these years, she continued to practice painting. She entered the Beijing Fine Art Academy as a full-time professional painter in 1976 and was highly respected by other painters.

=== Groups ===
Shao Fei was a prominent member of the Stars Art Group (xing xing) from 1979-80. During this time, she participated in the Star Art Exhibition held on September 27, 1979. The Chinese government disapproved of their art and did not grant them permission to hold the exhibition. In protest, Shao Fei and other Stars Art Group members held the exhibition outside the China Art Gallery to challenge the government over their authority of classifying art. In November 1979, the government granted them permission to officially hold their first exhibition “Star Art Exhibition” (xing xing hua zhan) in Beijing.

=== Relationships ===
Shao Fei was married to Bei Dao, a Chinese poet who openly opposed the Chinese government. They had one child. In 1987, they went to England when Bei Dao was invited as a visiting scholar at Durham University. In the 1990s, they emigrated to the US. Shao Fei and Bei Dao later separated.

== Art ==
=== Art Style ===
Shao Fei's works are usually decorative, fantastical, and figurative. She practices expressionist devices in her oil paintings, and she often depicts women and children in her work.

=== Works ===
Shao Fei's works are often inspired by historical private gardens that were common in Xiuning, Angui during the Ming Dynasty from 1368-1644. Many of these garden scenes were made into woodcut illustrations, which Shao Fei incorporates into her art.

She also includes mythological creatures inspired by the Chinese classic text Shanhaijing (Classic of Mountains and Seas).

Her art work, Last Song of the Grand Historian, is painted on both the front and back of the paper. This results in thick, opaque layers that resemble heavy colour painting. The rich colours used portray the intense range of emotions the viewer is meant to feel. Shao Fei distorts the subjects in her painting, so that the scene parallels an imaginary world.

== Exhibitions ==
Shao Fei's exhibitions mainly toured in China, Japan, and the US. In 1982, her works were featured at the Exhibition of the Central Academy of Beijing in China. The exhibition, Contemporary Chinese Painting, toured the US which featured many of her paintings done in 1984-85.

=== Collections ===
Many of Shao Fei's collections are currently featured in the National Art Museum of China, Hong Kong Museum of Art, and private collections in China.

== Reception ==
Shao Fei gained popularity as an exceptional painter, having received many positive reviews from art critics and news outlets. China Daily has described her work as a bridge between the real and the imaginary, stating, “Her delicate brush strokes and vibrant colors have connected the past and present, reality and fantasy.” Her paintings have been praised as powerfully emotional and deeply decorative, which art historian Michael Sullivan has noted her for her unique expressionist and fantastic art style.

== Impact ==
Social and cultural conservatism in China has restricted Chinese female artists to go beyond the realms of traditional art genres. Shao Fei goes beyond the norms and restrictions by composing landscape and figure paintings with highly expressive and decorative strokes, rather than the typical subdued, muted ones traditionally tied with women's art in China. Subsequently, she has expanded the possible art genres for women artists to explore in China.
