= The Hut on the Hill =

1985 short story by Can Xue

"The Hut on the Hill" (Chinese: 山上的小屋; pinyin: Shānshàng de xiǎowū) is an avant-garde short story written by Can Xue and first published in the 8th issue of People's Literature in August 1985. It was later reprinted in Taiwan and translated into at least four English versions.

Some translations include:

- "The Hut on the Hill", tr. Michael S. Duke, Renditions, nos. 27-28 (Autumn, 1987)
  - Reprinted in Worlds of Modern Chinese Fiction, Michael S. Duke ed., (Armonk: M. E. Sharpe, Inc., 1990)
- "The Mountain Cabin", tr. Mei Zhong, Chinese Literature: Fiction, Poetry, Art, (Beijing, Summer, 1989)
- "The Hut on the Mountain", trs. Jian Zhang and Ronald R. Janssen, in Dialogues in Paradise, Ronald R. Janssen and Jian Zhang trs., (Evanston: Northwestern University Press, 1989).
- "Hut on the Mountain", tr. Zhong Ming. in Formations 3, 3, (Winter 1987).

An English-language translation of this story was included in the 2016 Chinese literature anthology The Big Red Book of Modern Chinese Literature edited by Yunte Huang.

== Historical context ==
The Cultural Revolution broke out in 1966, when Can Xue had just graduated from elementary school. The revolution forced her to leave school and she was ordered to labor in the countryside with other teenagers. Because of childhood tuberculosis, she was able to stay in Changsha. During this period, Can Xue's father was sentenced to prison, and her mother went to the labor camp. The whole family suffered continuously from political and economic persecution. In order to make a living, Can Xue worked in a small neighborhood factory for ten years. After the Cultural Revolution ended in 1976, Can Xue's father resumed his job politically and in 1980. She began to run her own sewing business and more time for her writing.

Regarding her motivation for writing during the early ten years, she called it a kind of vengeance. The tough memories in her past experience were unforgettable, and the feeling of vengeance drove her to write down her feelings in the emotional realm. The irreconcilability of self and reality made her reflect on the restlessness of human nature. Everyone lives in the opposition between self and reality, and we all need to realize ourselves in the real environment. The self-completion of life is so complicated, as the liberation of ourselves is the result of the victory of the good side of our human nature in the war of opposites.

Although not educated in the school system, Can Xue dived into literature herself, both domestic and foreign, which profoundly influenced the formation of her literary thought. Specifically, she formed her Modernist literary thought and writing style on the basis of Western culture and Western literature. Different from western modernist literary style, Can Xue's works are not written from the character of human beings, but from an abstract perspective to express the spiritual world of humans. They write the story of the soul and its pursuit of human nature. The emphasis on female consciousness and female self is another important aspect of Can Xue's modernist literary thoughts and an important feature of her literary creation.

== Summary ==
The Hut on the Hill describes the absurd and chaotic life of a family living in a hut on the mountain.

The "I" refers to the protagonist, and this usage applies throughout the text. The narrator is portrayed as being in a persistent state of vigilance, highly sensitive to the surrounding environment. The external world is depicted as hostile, represented by the cold and watchful presence of the household in which the protagonist’s family lives.

The narrator describes organizing his desk drawer ever night, but the noise and light in his room driving his mom crazy. His parents regularly snuck into his room, peeping into drawers and stealing objects. A set of Go was buried near the well, and moths and dragonflies were scattered on the floor. He begins to view the expressions of his parents and sister as cruel and monstrous, and hatred and suspicion become the main theme of the family's daily life.

This hut itself provides a harsh and inhospitable environment. It is a simple wooden house, surrounded by no other inhabitants. Sometimes, the narrator would leave the hut to explore the mountain. After reaching the top of the hill, all he saw was desolate rocks flashing white flames, no wild grapes, no huts and no people. The narrator encounters a fierce north wind and the screaming of a howling wolf. Imagery such as black wind and white flames evoke the story's gloomy atmosphere.

In the short story, "I" was constantly controlled and persecuted by my family, and the family relationship was not reliable, which eventually led to his mental deterioration, and a desire to escape from the family. On the surface, these phenomena seem to dismantle the unreasonable traditional family conflicts and doubts about family relationships, and strengthen the hatred between people, including the closest people. When looking through these superficial structures, they will find that it is precisely that. Because of the strong spiritual burden brought by my too strong family affection, each of them reacted to escape from the most overwhelming family affection.

== Contributions ==
As one of Can Xue's representative short stories, Can Xue's other two works published in 1985, Soap Bubbles in Dirty Water (污水上的肥皂泡，Xin Chuangzao 1, 1985) in January and The Bull (Gongniu, 公牛, Furong, 4, 1985) in April, formed an impulse to the post-mao literary world at that time and laid the foundation for "Can Xue Style" (writing style). Although hailed as one of the leading avant-garde writers in the 1980s, Can Xue is also very different from other avant-gardes. Her modernist literary thought history was formed on the basis of Western culture and Western literature. Therefore, unlike other writers who focus on the character of the characters, she expresses the spiritual world of people from an abstract perspective, writing stories about the soul, and pursuing humanistic literature.

Her writing style has many similarities with Kafka, who is known as the father of modern literature. Although living in different social backgrounds and different life experiences, Kafka and Can Xue have a very similar style of writing, and has the reputation of Oriental Kafka. The biggest similarity between the two is that they are invariably concerned about the absurdity of people and the absurdity of the world. Both novels are permeated with a strong sense of absurdity. Obviously, due to differences in times, life experiences, etc., this absurd consciousness must show certain differences. The absurd consciousness in Kafka's novels points to eternal tragedy, while Can Xue's absurd consciousness is "the night gave me black eyes, but I use it to find light".

The emphasis on female consciousness and female self is an important aspect of Can Xue's modernist literary thoughts and an important feature of her literary creation. Can Xue believes that women are self-digging. The deeper you dig, the wider the passage and the bigger the world. The stronger and more unique the ego of a work, the deeper its spiritual world. Can Xue believes that the exploration of women's self-personality in contemporary Chinese literature is still relatively superficial and has not reached a deeper level. Feminine consciousness is a part of self-consciousness, it is the experience of self-existence by people as an individual gender, which is rooted in Western culture. Women who have been on the margins are most likely to break through their own dilemma. This dilemma also includes a breakthrough from the Chinese female role consciousness of "Xian qi liang mu" (good wife and mother), because women's personal consciousness is stronger than men, and men have more collective consciousness. Can Xue believes that women have always been marginalized and ignored in society. They are less affected by traditional culture than men and have less ideological burden. These are women writers than men. It is easier for writers to obtain their own advantages.

On the basis of critique of the patriarchal culture and its male texts, Can Xue emphasized the inner connection between women's body, language, and psychology with literature, and emphasized women's subconscious desires. It is this kind of desire that constitutes the inner drive of female writers. Creation is an explosion of women's suppressed feminine consciousness, and a liberating act that enables women to transcend their self-structure. Her affirmation of the irreplaceability of female literary creation is a powerful impact on the traditional literary thought centered on patriarchal culture.

== See also ==
- Absurdist fiction
- Women writers in Chinese literature
- Feminism in China
- Avant-garde
- Modernism
