= Wellsweep Press =

British publishing company

The Wellsweep Press was a UK-based independent publishing house, specialising in the publication of literary translation from Chinese. It was founded by poet and literary translator John Cayley in the 1980s, and published books from 1988 through the 1990s. It played a particularly important role in publishing contemporary and avant-garde Chinese literature in translation in the 1990s.

== Publications ==
- (1988) Songs of my heart : yong huai shi: the Chinese lyric poetry of Ruan Ji, tr. Graham Hartill and Wu Fusheng. (Wellsweep Chinese Poets 1)
- (1989) Wine flying: a Chinese quatrain, by Qi Qian, tr. John Cayley
- (1990) The deep woods' business: uncollected translations from the Chinese, by Arthur Cooper
- (1990) Plantains in the rain: selected Chinese poems of Du Mu, tr. by R.F. Burton (Wellsweep Chinese Poets 3)
- (1990) Poems of the West Lake: translations from the Chinese, by A. C. Graham
- (1991) Blades from the willows, by Huanzhulouzhu, tr. Robert Chard
- (1992) The frozen torch: selected prose poems, by Shang Ch'in, tr. N.G.D. Malmqvist (Wellsweep Chinese Poets 4)
- (1993) Ritual & diplomacy: the Macartney mission to China, 1792-1794; papers presented at the 1992 conference of the British Association for Chinese Studies marking the bicentenary of the Macartney mission to China, ed. by Robert A. Bickers.
- (1993) Ruan Ji's island & (Tu Fu) in the cities, by Graham Hartill
- (1994) Under-sky underground, ed. by Henry Y.H. Zhao and John Cayley, with foreword by Jonathan D. Spence (Chinese Writing Today 1)
- (1994) The lost boat : avant-garde fiction from China, ed. by Henry Y.H. Zhao
- (1994) Whistling free : the complete non-dramatic lyrics of Ma Zhiyuan, tr. by William Dolby.
- (1994) From the first emperor to Khublai Khan: an introduction to studying Chinese history, by T H Barrett
- (1995) Non-person singular: selected poems by Yang Lian, tr. Brian Holton (translator) (Wellsweep Chinese Poets 6)
- (1996) Abandoned wine, ed. by Henry Y.H. Zhao and John Cayley, with foreword by Gary Snyder (Chinese Writing Today 2)

Digital poetry

- (1993) Indra's net, or, Hologography, by John Cayley.
- (1993) Collocations: Indra's net II, by John Cayley
- (1993) Moods & conjunctions: Indra's net III, by John Cayley
- (1995) An essay on the golden lion: Indra's net IV, by John Cayley
- (1995) Leaving the city: Indra's net V, by John Cayley
- (1995) Book unbound: Indra's net VI, by John Cayley
- (1995) The speaking clock: Indra's net VII, by John Cayley
- (1996) Pressing the REVEAL CODE key: Indra's net VIII, by John Cayley
- (1996) Oisleánd: Indra's net IX, by John Cayley
