= Li Li (poet and translator) =

Sino-Swedish poet and translator (born 1961)

Li Li (Chinese: 李笠; pinyin: Lǐ Lì), born January 20, 1961, in Shanghai, China, currently residing in Stockholm, is a poet and literary translator.

Li studied Swedish at the University in Beijing and went to Sweden as an exchange student in 1988. Following Tiananmen Square Massacre in June, 1989, he decided to stay in Sweden. The same year he debuted with a collection of poetry in Swedish "Blick i vattnet". In China he is an acclaimed poet as well as translator of Swedish poetry to Chinese. For his work, he has received many literary distinctions, including recently Yinchuan Poetry Prize for his translations of Tranströmer into Chinese. In 2009, he received the Svenska Dagbladet Literature Prize for his collection Ursprunget.

== Poetry ==
- Sömnlös (with Illustrations by Qiu Dali), 1988 (Shih-mien)
- Blick i vattnet: dikter, 1989
- Tidens tyngd: dikter, 1990
- Att fly: dikter, 1994
- Retur: dikter, 1995
- En plats som är du: dikter, 1999
- Ursprunget, 2007

== Translations ==
To Chinese from Swedish:

- Yiwang de guitu (Den motsträviga skapelsen by Kjell Espmark), 1991
- Telangsiteluomu shi quanji (Samlade dikter by Tomas Tranströmer), 2001

To Swedish from Chinese:

- En tunga ska växa ut : ny kinesisk dikt, i översättning av Li Li och Göran Sommardal, 2007
