= Yao Sui =

Yao Sui (Chinese: 姚燧; 1238–1313), courtesy name Duanfu (端甫), art name Mu'an (牧菴), was a writer of Chinese sanqu poetry and official of the Yuan dynasty. He was the nephew of the noted official Yao Shu (姚樞) and uncle of the dramatist and sanqu poet Yao Shouzhong.

At three, Yao Sui was orphaned. He was raised by his uncle Yao Shu. He began his studies with the scholar Xu Heng. At age twenty four he began his study of the Tang period prose masters and shortly thereafter began his thirty-year career as an official, eventually becoming a member of the Hanlin Academy and held various other appointments. He was part of the team that drafted the Veritable Records of the Emperor Shizu of Yuan (元世祖實錄). The family had roots in Liaoning and subsequently relocated to Luoyang. His formal collected writings of fifty chapters has survived, as well as a small collection of his sanqu lyrics, and other writings.
