= Xu Zihua =

Chinese poet

Xu Zihua (Chinese: 徐自华; 1873–1935) was a Chinese poet.

She was educated at home and interested in poetry from an early age. She became a widow when she was still young and became the principal of Xunxi Girls' School. Both she and her sister Xu Yunhua were part of the South Association. In 1906, she hired Qiu Jin, an anti-Qing Empire revolutionary and poet, as an assistant. They quickly became close friends. Together with Qiu Jin, Xu Zihua started the magazine Chinese Women's News, which published about issues that were at the time considered radical feminist, such as self-education, child education, Western-style healthcare, and economic self-sufficiency. Both Wu Zhiying and Xu Zihua contributed to Qiu Jin a lot on her road of feminism, and at the same time they were also affected by Qiu Jin's ideas about equality between men and women.

Qiu Jin was executed in 1907. Four months after her execution, Wu Zhiying send a message to Xu Zihua to discuss the process of Qiu Jin's wish to be buried in Xiling and to help arrange her funeral. Several thousand people came and it turned into a public protest. Both Xu Zihua and the other chief mourner, Wu Zhiying, were on the Qing government's wanted list. Still, Xu Zihua continued to compose poems and essays in Qiu Jin's memory. During this process, her daughter became ill with Diphtheria. The tragedy Xu Zihua encountered greatly affected her health in both body and spirit. Her life after meeting Qiu Jin was dedicated to the revolutionary cause and to writing poetry about ideology and about parting with her daughter and her best friend Qiu Jin. Her poetry is collected in Xu Zihua shiwen ji.

On December 9, 1912, after reconstructs of the Fengyuting, Xu Zihua requests of revolutionary leader Sun Yat-sen to give condolence to Qiu Jin's grave and write her a brief couplet to compliment her heroic deeds.

Xu Zihua died in 1935, leaving one surviving son, Mei Xin.
