= Frontier (novel) =

Novel by Can Xue

- English edition (2017)
- Author: Can Xue
- Original title: 边疆
- Translator: Chen Zeping & Karen Gernant
- Language: Chinese
- Publisher: Wen Yi Chu Ban She (first edition), Open Letter Books (English translation)
- Publication date: 2008 (first edition)
- Publication place: China
- English publication date: 2017
- Media type: Print
- Pages: 336 p.
- ISBN: 9787532132676
- OCLC: 222147981

Frontier is a novel by Chinese avant-garde writer Can Xue. Set primarily in a location known as Pebble Town, it follows the misadventures of a group of loosely related characters that seem to be wandering in and out of each other's dreams. Each character seems to have arrived in Pebble Town for a different reason, and many are connected to an organization known as the Design Institute.

First published in China in 2008, Open Letter Books published an English translation by Karen Gernant and Chen Zeping in 2017.

== Characters ==
The characters featured in the novel include:

- Qiming — The lovesick custodian at the Design Institute who obsesses over a Uighur woman he once met.
- Amy – An occasionally violent shepherd.
- Liujin — A character who lives alone and sells cloth at the market. "Liujin" is also the name of Juan and Nancy's daughter.
- Marco — The only major character actually born in Pebble Town. Marco is obsessed with Holland.
- Juan and Nancy — A married couple who travel to Pebble Town from Smoke City.
- Ying — The only black man living in Pebble Town.
- The unnamed Director of the Design Institute.

== Interpretation ==
Noting the enigmatic dialogue, contradicting moments, and lack of a clear revelation, J. Andrew Goodman argued that Frontiers expresses estrangement: "In spite of the small community and everyone's closeness, people are estranged from one another. In spite of people's settling in Pebble Town, they are still transient, aimless."

== Reception ==
Amanda DeMarco wrote, "At the sentence level, [Frontier] is a wonderful, carefully hewn thing, lucid and pure". Yun Ni criticized the replacement of Chinese names with homophonous English substitutes, saying that "complexities of the characters’ personalities [are] embodied in their Chinese names". She still called the translation "highly accomplished" and praised the novel as well. J. Andrew Goodman of The Collagist lauded the "simplicity of Can Xue's (or the translation of her text at least) language. [...] she uses sparse words to describe the surroundings of Pebble Town, which works to its own great effect". Goodman also wrote, "Can Xue is masterful in her expression of feelings, how they physically manifest and how her characters wander and invite others into them."

A Publishers Weekly reviewer wrote, "Without the labor of critical reading, the surface-level narrative may be difficult to follow. Even if the actual events can be hard to parse, Can Xue’s powerful imagery will flood the senses and immerse readers in this magical world." Amal El-Mohtar described the book as one of precise subtlety and praised the translation, but wrote, "Patterns recur, but to track them or expect them to lead to something is a mistake." She seconded the view of Porochista Khakpour in the introduction that "the book seems pleasurably to lengthen as we read it"; El-Mohtar concluded that "like Dubuffet's [Shot in the Wing], the more you look, the more you see, and the harder it is to speak of what you see to someone who isn't also looking."
