= Guo Lusheng =

Chinese poet

- 郭路生
- Born: Guo Lusheng; 1948 (age 77–78); Chaocheng, Shandong, China
- Occupation: poet
- Spouse(s): Li Yalan (1975－1982)
- Writing career
- Pen name: Shi Zhi 食指, index finger
- Period: 1967－

Guo Lusheng (Chinese: 郭路生, born 1948 Shandong), pen name Shi Zhi (食指, index finger), was an influential Chinese poet of the 1960s, considered the "founder of the New Poetry movement".

His poems were the first to break with the Mao Zedong-style classicist poetry, expressing the "bewilderment of the Red Guard generation". Young readers spread his poems widely in hand-copied form, and he was one of the mascots of the sent-down youth generation - educated youth who were sent to the countryside during the cultural revolution. This underground poetry movement continued over the next 30 years, and he inspired several modern movements including the Misty poets.

== Life ==
Guo Lusheng's father, Guo Yunxuan, was in the Red Army, and like the wives of many Red Army soldiers, his mother was accompanying the army, when he was born by the roadside during a bitter winter march in 1948. The name Lusheng means "born on the road".

He started writing poetry early, and came into attention of the authorities for his poetry, which were noted for their "bourgeois values" by an admiring teacher at school. Along with Zhang Langlang and Mu Dunbai, he was a member of the underground literature group ‘Sun Fleet’, which was broken up in 1966, with many of the members committing suicide or receiving death sentences; Guo himself was arrested and beaten up

Despite being released, he had been branded a "rightist student" and could sense the danger swirling all around him.

During the Cultural revolution in 1968, Guosheng was sent for two years to the Apricot village in Shanxi. During this period he fell in love with the Uyghur girl Lili, and wrote some tragic love poems. Upon his return, he was inducted in the People's Liberation Army, hoping he may be able to get his poetry published. He was given a clerical position, but he became depressed and withdrawn from the oppressive conditions; he was soon discharged.

With all his friends scattered, Lusheng shut himself in his room and became a chain-smoker. Soon thereafter, his father saw that he had drawn a picture of a man with a long knife to his neck, and became concerned that he may be contemplating suicide. The family took him to a mental institution, and since then he has been passing his time shuttling between home and the hospital. Eventually, he was diagnosed with schizophrenia in 1973.

During a reprieve from the mental institution, he met and married Ala Li, the daughter of Li Lisan, an early leader of the Chinese Communist Revolution and ex-minister of labour, who died in mysterious circumstances.

Despite his prominence, Lusheng was largely forgotten in the opening up era, though a quiet resurgence is under way. He lived in a mental ward along with fifty other patients in Beijing, for many years, but now lives at home.

In 2002, he read at Guangzhou. In 2008, he read at The World Literature Today Conference, at Beijing Normal University.

== Poetry ==
In 1968, in the shadow of the Prague Spring, he wrote the despairing poem "Believe in the future" (相信未来 xiangxin weilai), which spread among the red guard generation:

When spider webs seal my stove without mercy
When ember smoke sighs over sad poverty
I spread out the despairing ashes stubbornly
And write with fair snowflakes "believe in the future" (transl. Michelle Yeh,

Other noted poetry from the period, circulated widely in samizdat fashion, includes Beijing 4:08 PM, about the melancholy of the sent-down youth generation youth, leaving their homes for working in the countryside, and Three songs on fish, which captures the perplexity of the youth. His pen name Shi Zhi (index finger) became a byword among the Red Guard youth.

In 1978, amid a brief cultural thaw, Bei Dao and Mang Ke, editors of the poetry magazine Jiantian (Today), published some of Guo's poetry. In the spring of 1979, when the Jiantian group organized China's first private poetry readings in Beijing's Yuyuantan Park, Chen Kaige (now a prominent film director) recited "Believe in the Future".

Since the opening up of China, Guo Lusheng had emerged as a literary star from this period. A collection of his poetry was published in 1998 by the prestigious Writer's publishing Company, mediated by poet and friend Lin Mang. In 2001, he won the People's Literature Prize

He continues to write on themes related to the mental hospital, where he was frequently visited by his many friends and admirers.
