= Bei Dao =

Chinese-American writer (born 1949)

- 北岛
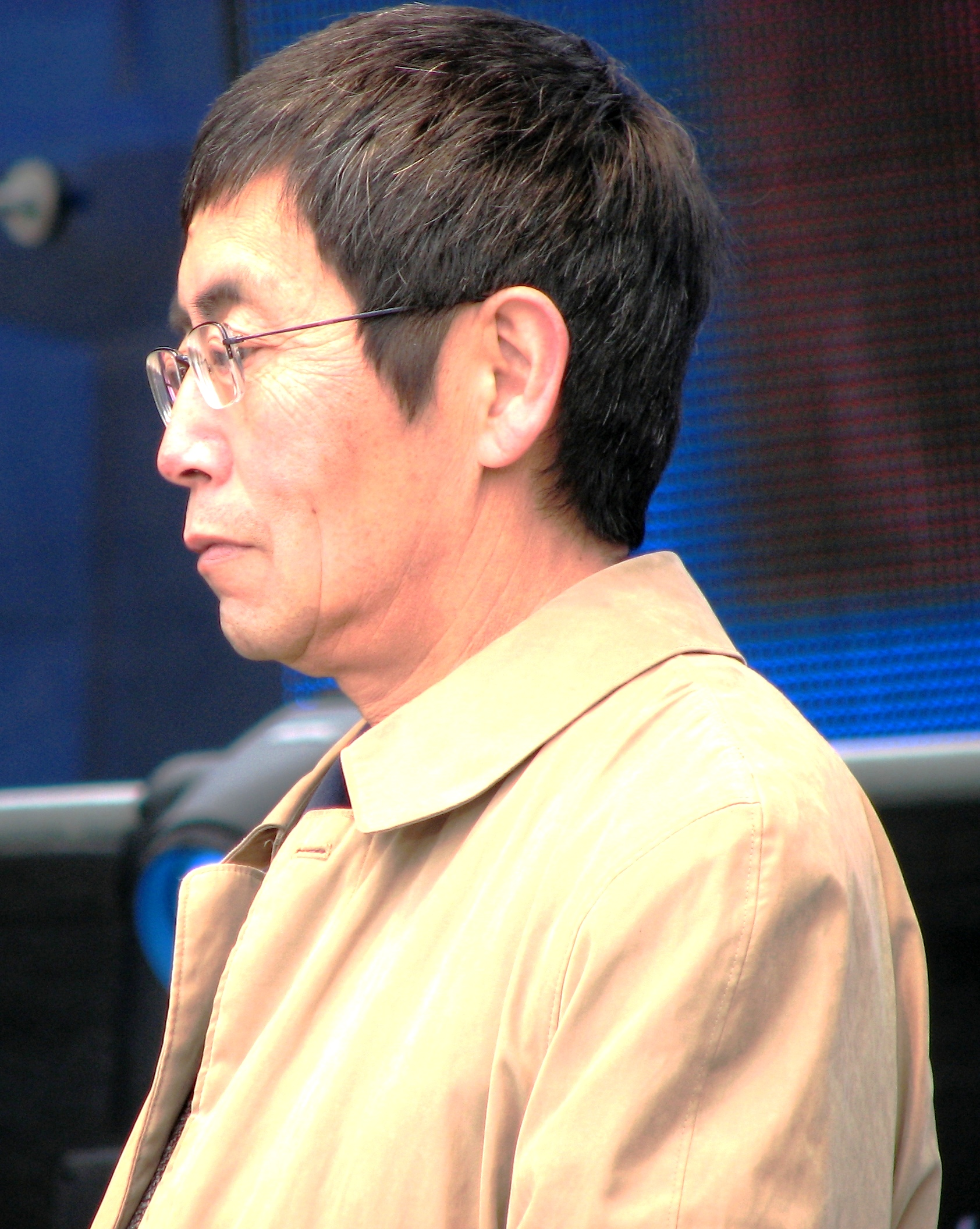
- Bei Dao in Tallinn, 2010
- Born: Zhao Zhenkai (赵振开); August 2, 1949 (age 77); Beijing, China
- Citizenship: China (1949–89); Stateless (1989–2009); United States (from 2009)
- Occupations: Poet; writer; professor
- Writing career
- Language: Mandarin Chinese
- Years active: 1978–present
- Period: Contemporary
- Genres: Poetry; fiction; essay
- Notable awards: Guggenheim Fellowship (1998); Golden Wreath of the Struga Poetry Evenings (2015)
- Movement: Misty Poets

Bei Dao (simplified Chinese: 北岛; traditional Chinese: 北島; pinyin: Běi Dǎo; lit. 'Northern Island', born August 2, 1949) is the pen name of the Chinese-American writer Zhao Zhenkai (simplified Chinese: 赵振开; traditional Chinese: 趙振開; pinyin: Zhào Zhènkāi). Among the most acclaimed Chinese-language poets of his generation, he is often regarded as a candidate for the Nobel Prize in Literature. In addition to poetry, he is the author of short fiction, essays, and a memoir. Known as a dissident, he is a prominent representative of a school of poetry known variously in the West as "Misty" or "Obscure" Poetry.

Born in Beijing before the establishment of the People's Republic of China, Bei Dao served as a member of the Red Guards in his youth. However, disillusioned by the Cultural Revolution, he participated in the 1976 Tiananmen Incident and co-founded an influential literary journal, called Jintian (Today), that came to be officially banned in China. After his poetry and activism were an inspiration to the 1989 Tiananmen Square protests, Bei Dao was banned from China and entered a period of exile in the West, living and teaching in numerous countries before settling in the United States. He has been allowed to return to mainland China since 2006, but has not done so except for brief visits. In 2007, he joined the faculty of the Chinese University of Hong Kong. In 2009, he became an American citizen.

Bei Dao has been described as having played a significant role in creating a new form of poetry in Chinese literature, one that is often viewed as a reaction to the artistic strictures of the Mao era. In particular, his poetry is known for linguistic experimentation and an embrace of complexity, even paradox, in its exploration of individuality.

Currently, Bei Dao resides in Hong Kong, where he is an Honorary Professor of Humanities at the Chinese University of Hong Kong.

== Biography ==
=== Family and early life ===
Bei Dao was born in Beijing, China, on August 2, 1949. He is the eldest of three children of Zhao Jinian (d. 2003), an insurance executive, and Zhao Mei Li (née Sun), a medical doctor.

Bei Dao was born into a notable family. On his father's side, he traces his lineage to the reign of the Kangxi Emperor, when his ancestor, Zhao Bingyan, was the provincial governor of Hunan and deputy minister of justice. During the Taiping Rebellion, his great-great grandfather, Zhao Jingxian, gained fame for defending the city of Huzhou against a rebel siege for more than two years. When the Xianfeng Emperor was informed of his death, he issued an imperial decree of praise, ordered reparations paid to the family, established an ancestral hall for the family in Huzhou, and recorded Zhao Jingxian's life in the Official Archive of National History. Bei Dao's great-grandfather was director of the Guangdong Manufacturing Bureau and retired as director of the Shanghai Manufacturing Bureau. However, due to war and internal strife in China, the family's fortune declined, and his paternal grandfather earned a modest living selling paintings and scrolls before dying when Bei Dao's father was still a child.

While his father's side of the family had been defenders and beneficiaries of the Qing Dynasty, Bei Dao's maternal side of the family played a role in overthrowing the empire. His maternal grandfather, Sun Haixia, was a member of the Tongmenghui society founded by Sun Yat-sen, who eventually became provisional president of post-imperial China. During the Wuchang Uprising, Sun Haixia was hailed as a hero for seizing a key telegraph station. In addition to founding a secondary school in Hubei, he later served as director of the telecommunications bureau of Chengdu and then directed the telecommunications bureau of Shanghai. After the establishment of the People's Republic of China, one of Bei Dao's maternal aunts was personal nurse to Mao Zedong's wife, Jiang Qing. Among his uncles, one was a deputy mayor of Wuhan, and another was vice chairman of the China Zhi Gong Party, one of eight political parties officially permitted in the People's Republic of China.

Bei Dao's father was self-educated and passed a test to gain employment at a bank. He was later a co-founder of the People's Insurance Company of China and a deputy secretary for propaganda for the China Association for Promoting Democracy (CAPD), a political party. Bei Dao's parents married in Shanghai and settled in Beijing the year before the poet's birth. They lived in the city's Xicheng District, which borders the Forbidden City and has been known as a home to the middle and upper classes. Bei Dao grew up on Sanbulao ("Three Never Old") Hutong, a street named for its most famous resident, Admiral Zheng He.

Despite his parents' professional status, Bei Dao did not have a carefree upbringing. Due to the "Great Leap Forward" policies of Mao Zedong, which shifted resources toward securing a socialist society, Bei Dao's father was assigned to manage academic affairs for the newly established Central Institute of Socialism and the family experienced the hardships of the Great Chinese Famine. Writing in his memoir, City Gate, Open Up, Bei Dao describes his memory of that period:

Hunger gradually devoured our lives. Dropsy became commonplace. Everyone's usual greeting to each other changed from "Have you eaten yet" to "Have you gotten dropsy yet," then the pant legs were pulled up and each used their fingers to test the other's degree of illness.

Like many Chinese youth, Bei Dao joined the Young Pioneers of China. He attended Beijing Middle School No. 13, where his teachers praised his writing. He then tested into the elite Beijing No. 4 High School. However, he was unable to graduate: in 1966, when Bei Dao was sixteen, Mao Zedong launched the Cultural Revolution, which closed the school. (In 2011, upon receiving an honorary doctorate from Brown University, Bei Dao remarked that it was the first degree he had ever received.)

=== Cultural Revolution ===
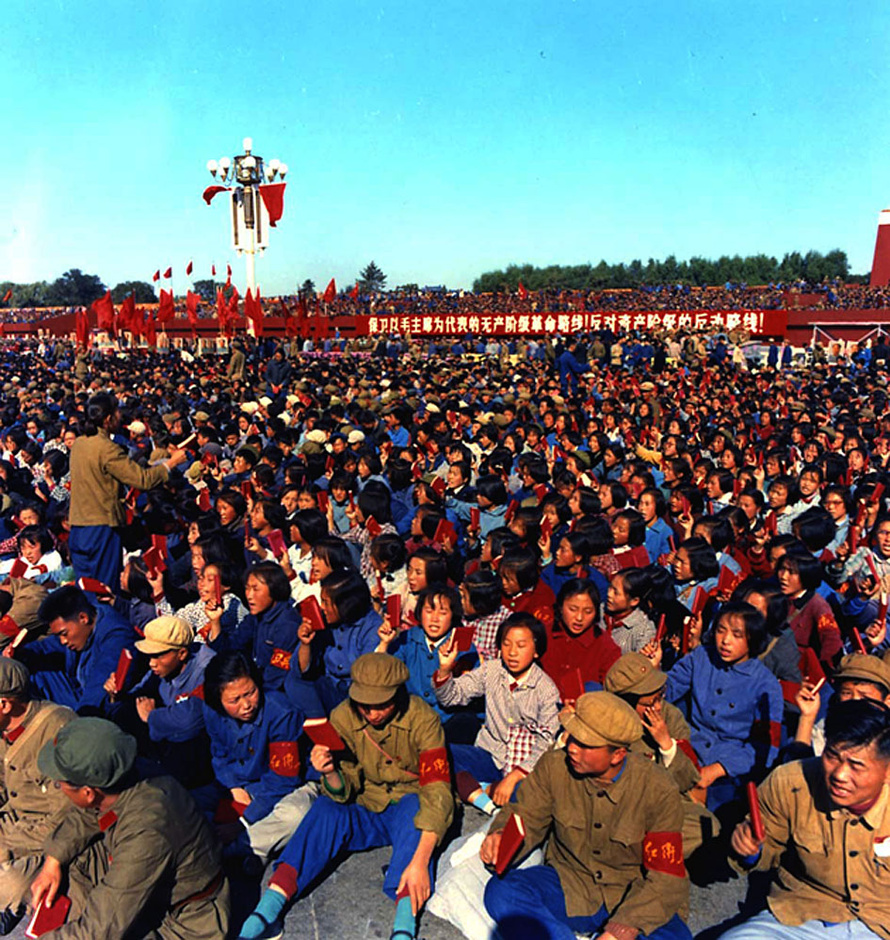
Red Guards in Tiananmen Square, 1966

Having not been selected for induction into the People's Liberation Army, Bei Dao spent the first two years of the Cultural Revolution immersed in political activities as a member of a Red Guard faction based at his high school. Initially, he created posters denouncing his former teachers. He led a group of teenagers in publicly shaming a neighbor, forcibly shaving the man's head in the street and briefly imprisoning him. He moved into a dormitory at his high school, which became a hub for revolutionary activity, hosting various committees and "struggle sessions". The students there formed a commune composed of two Red Guard factions dedicated to promoting the ideals of the revolution, for which Bei Dao assisted in disseminating propaganda. On a regional tour in 1966, he and his fellow Red Guard members helped bring an end to a siege of the Anting train station by anti-Maoist protestors, an incident that gave rise to the Shanghai People's Commune. Later, during the "Down to the Countryside" movement, he joined delegations to observe education efforts outside Beijing.

In 1967, the Chinese Communist Party (CCP) officially disavowed the Red Guards due to their frequently violent tactics and disruptive effect on the national economy, and by the following year had largely succeeded in dismantling the movement. Bei Dao, like many former Red Guard members, was assigned to "re-education through labor". Beginning in 1969, he spent the remainder of the Cultural Revolution as a member of a construction crew outside of Beijing. As a result of this experience, during which he lived among the poor, he came to reject Maoist policies and communist propaganda.

By the early 1970s, Bei Dao began to focus on writing. His early poems drew praise from the acclaimed poet Bing Xin, to whom Bei Dao's father reported at the CAPD. During visits to Beijing, his home became a gathering place for friends and aspiring artists. These meetings were monitored by the neighborhood political committee, and on one occasion police raided the home of one member of the group. To avoid drawing attention, Bei Dao wrote alone in his kitchen late at night. In 1974, he composed the first draft of his novella, "Waves," in a darkroom under the guise that he was developing photographs.

Overall, the Cultural Revolution was a tumultuous period for Bei Dao and his family. Like him, his siblings were sent away on "re-education through labor" assignments. His parents were sent to May Seventh Cadre School to undergo "ideological thought reform"; accused of living a bourgeois lifestyle (for, among other things, employing a nanny) they faced isolation, interrogation, and hard labor. The family was thus separated for much of the decade that Cultural Revolution policies were in force. In 1968, Bei Dao's aunt committed suicide after she became the focus of a government investigation. In July 1976, his sister died while attempting to rescue a drowning person. In his memoir, Bei Dao writes, "At this pivotal point in my life, I tried to reassess the past and peer into the future, but everything seemed fuzzy, indiscernible, my heart empty, vacuous".

=== 1976 Tiananmen Incident and aftermath ===
A watershed event occurred in April 1976, when the government's attempt to minimize public mourning for the death of Chinese Premier Zhou Enlai led to protests in Tiananmen Square—the first significant anti-government protests since the beginning of the Cultural Revolution. Bei Dao participated in the demonstrations, which were violently suppressed. Inspired by his experience, he wrote what became his most famous poem, "The Answer," which has been compared to Bob Dylan's "Blowin' in the Wind" for its impact on a generation of Chinese. Written with defiant language, and extolling human agency, the poem has been described as a refusal of restrictions like those adopted during the Cultural Revolution.

After the death of Mao and the arrest of the "Gang of Four" in the latter half of 1976, the Cultural Revolution came to an end, ushering in a relaxation of government control of speech. Bei Dao and his friend, the poet Mang Ke, assembled the literary journal Jintian (Today), working with mimeographs. The first issue appeared in 1978 and was distributed by hand or posted, as broadsides, on what came to be known as Beijing's "Democracy Wall". It featured Bei Dao's poem, "The Answer," as well as a short story he wrote. To avoid governmental scrutiny, he published under a pseudonym, Bei Dao, "Northern Island," chosen by his friend Mang Ke because Bei Dao hailed from the north of China and preferred solitude. The journal was notable for its literary quality: in its pages, readers were introduced to a group of poets—including Gu Cheng, Duo Duo, Yang Lian, and Shu Ting, among others—whom Chinese critics dubbed "menglong", which has been translated in English as "misty" or "obscure", in reference to their embrace of complexity and rejection of the Maoist principles of socialist realism. "The Answer," in particular, spread through the Chinese underground and vaulted Bei Dao to national fame.

Bei Dao continued to publish poetry and short fiction in Jintian, which appeared irregularly until Chinese authorities banned it in 1980. In the same year, he married the artist Shao Fei and moved out of his childhood home. He also transitioned away from employment in construction after eleven years—five years as a concrete mixer and six as an ironworker. He found work as a journalist, writing for the magazine China Report. He also translated Western poets into Chinese.

Bei Dao's poetry appeared in the officially approved Chinese journal Shi Kan (Poetry Monthly) during the "Democracy Wall" era of 1978-1980. His poems first appeared in English translation in 1983, when they were featured in the journal Renditions, published by the Chinese University Press. In the same year, a collection of his poems was published as Notes from the City of the Sun by the Cornell University East Asia Program as part of its "East Asia Papers" series. The following year, his poems appeared in English in the Bulletin of Concerned Asian Scholars. During the years 1983-84, his work was banned in China due to a government campaign to combat "spiritual pollution". When that campaign ended, his work appeared again in Chinese in a Communist Party publication called An Anthology of New Trends in Poetry, which Bei Dao has credited with having "a profound and wide-reaching influence" in China. In 1985, a selection of his work was included in an English-language anthology called Contemporary Chinese Literature, while his story collection, Waves, was published in Chinese by the Chinese University Press. Collectively, these publications introduced Bei Dao to scholars in the West, and he received an invitation to visit Europe in 1985. In the same year, his daughter, whom he nicknamed Tiantian, was born. In 1986, his collected poems appeared in Chinese. By the spring of 1987, he had taken up a post as a visiting lecturer at Durham University in England.

=== 1989 Tiananmen Square protests and massacre ===
In the fall of 1988, Bei Dao and his wife and daughter returned to Beijing. In his home, he and his colleagues drafted a petition calling for the release of pro-democracy activists like Wei Jingsheng. Bei Dao and over thirty colleagues signed and publicly released the document in February 1989. When the government denounced the petition, Bei Dao and fellow activists held a press conference to announce an organized effort to promote democracy and human rights in China.

In April 1989, when student-led protests erupted in Tiananmen Square, Bei Dao was in San Francisco, taking part in a conference. "Every day," he has written, "my eyes were fixed on the developments of the situation at home". Protestors recited or displayed lines of Bei Dao's poetry—particularly from his poems "The Answer" and "Declaration"—on posters and banners. The next month, he was in the Netherlands for a meeting of PEN International, where his presence on stage caused the Chinese delegation to leave in protest. On June 4, 1989, when the Chinese military forcibly ended the Tiananmen Square demonstrations, resulting in a mass number of casualties, Bei Dao was in West Berlin as a writer-in-residence at the DAAD Artists-in-Berlin Program. He has described that day as "a nightmare" that left him "utterly dejected".

Citing Bei Dao's influence via his advocacy and writing, the Chinese government banned him from returning to China. His wife and daughter remained in Beijing and were prevented from joining him. Several other Misty Poets were also exiled: Gu Cheng, Duo Duo, and Yang Lian. Speaking to foreign television outlets upon her escape from China, the student protest leader Chai Ling demonstrated the influence of Bei Dao's work when she quoted from his poem, "Declaration": "I will not kneel on the ground / allowing the executioners to look tall / the better to obscure the wind of freedom".

=== Exile ===
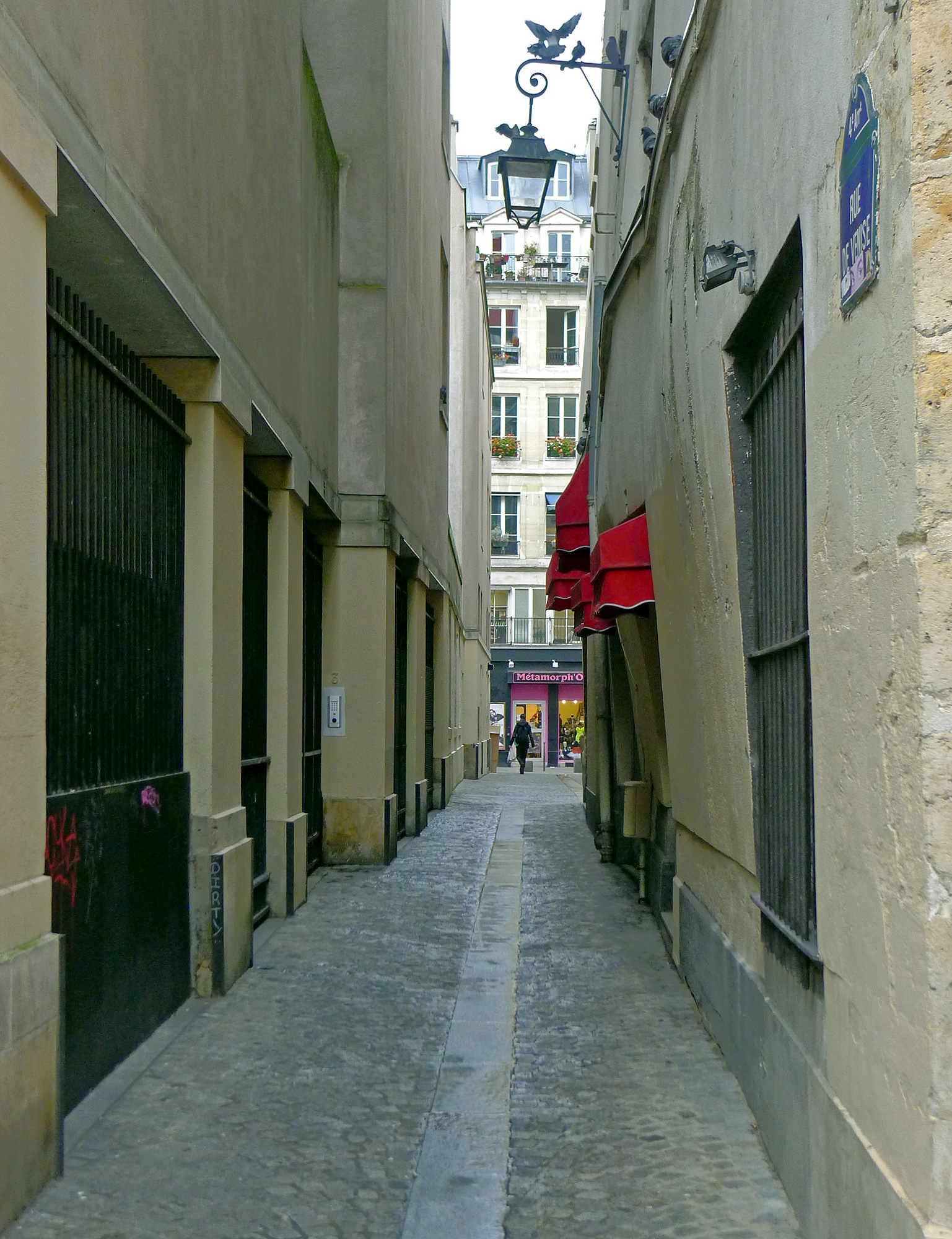
Rue de Venise, where Bei Dao lived in Paris

Stranded in Europe, Bei Dao moved from one country to another. After his term as a visiting writer in West Berlin, he spent much of 1990 in Scandinavia, where, in Oslo, he and fellow exiles decided to revive Jintian as an émigré journal. His forced exile garnered global media attention as well as increased interest in his work. For example, in addition to invitations to speak at international literary conferences, two collections of his work appeared in the United States simultaneously: a poetry collection, The August Sleepwalker, and a fiction collection, Waves. Writing in The New York Times Book Review, the sinologist Jonathan Spence praised the books as "powerful" and "astonishing and beautiful". In 1991, Bei Dao relocated to Paris, where he lived on Rue de Venise, across from the Pompidou Center. Another poetry collection, Old Snow, appeared in English that year.

For the 1992-93 academic year, Bei Dao was a writer-in-residence at Leiden University in the Netherlands. Back in Paris in the summer of 1993, he co-founded the International Parliament of Writers, an organization dedicated to assisting authors in need of refuge or asylum. In the fall of 1993, he was appointed the McCandless Chair in the Humanities at Eastern Michigan University. The following year, he was a visiting faculty member at the University of Michigan. His third poetry collection to appear in English, Forms of Distance, was then published. While he received support from numerous institutions and individuals, his separation from family weighed heavily; he has spoken of the emotional distress he experienced during this period. In 1994, he attempted to return to China, but was detained on his arrival at Beijing Capital International Airport and then deported.

In 1995, he accepted a one-year faculty position at the University of California at Davis. That year, he was reunited with his wife and daughter, who were permitted to leave China, and he was able to see his parents during a visit to Paris. His fourth poetry collection to be published in English, Landscape Over Zero, also appeared in 1995. In all, buoyed by a Guggenheim Fellowship, he remained in Davis, California, for five years. He and his wife ultimately divorced and his daughter returned to Beijing to continue her education.

For the 2000-01 academic year, Bei Dao took up an appointment as the Lois and Willard Mackey Chair in Creative Writing at Beloit College. During that year, an essay collection, Blue House, and a poetry collection, Unlock, were published in English. In 2001, after his father became seriously ill, Bei Dao was granted permission to visit him in Beijing; his visit in December of that year marked his first time in China since 1989. The experience prompted him to begin work on a memoir about his youth.

In 2002, Bei Dao joined a delegation from the International Parliament of Writers—including Russell Banks, José Saramago, Wole Soyinka, Breyten Breytenbach, Vincenzo Consolo, Juan Goytisolo, and Christian Salmon—for a visit to the poet Mahmoud Darwish in the Palestinian territory of the West Bank. The visit caused a diplomatic row between Israel and Portugal after Israel objected to José Saramago's public characterization of Israeli policy toward Palestinians. The visit garnered further attention when the delegation met with Palestinian leader Yasser Arafat. Bei Dao described the trip in an essay, "Midnight's Gate", which became the title of a collection of essays that appeared in English in 2005.

Between 2002 and 2005, Bei Dao was based primarily in New York City. He taught at Stony Brook University, and spent a semester as a visiting writer at the University of Alabama. During this period, he remarried and had a son. From 2005 to 2007, he was a writer-in-residence at the University of Notre Dame.

=== Hong Kong and latest work ===
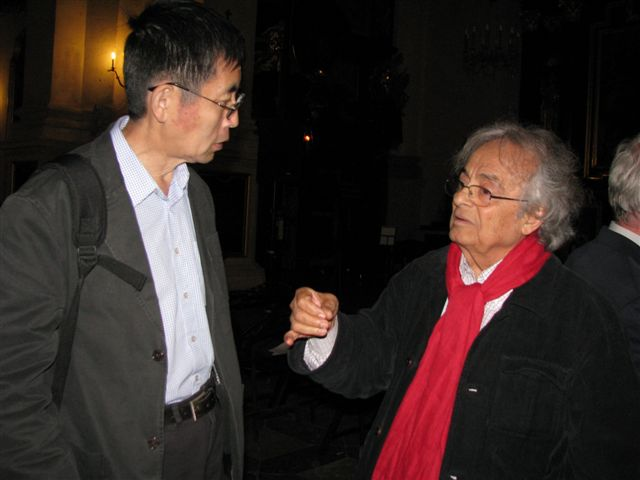
Bei Dao with Syrian poet Adunis, 2011

In 2006, the Chinese government allowed Bei Dao to return permanently to China. In 2007 he moved to Hong Kong, where he was offered a permanent faculty position at the Chinese University of Hong Kong. His visits to the mainland have been rare. For example, in 2011 he made a surprise visit to the Qinghai Lake International Poetry Festival, where he was swarmed by admirers. In 2009, he became a naturalized American citizen. In 2010, his memoir, City Gate, Open Up, appeared in Chinese (it appeared in English in 2017), and in the same year a retrospective of his poetry, The Rose of Time: New and Selected Poems, was published in English.

Beginning in 2014, Bei Dao served as editor for a series of books for children, an initiative he undertook after he was disappointed by the quality of poetry his son was taught in school.

In addition to his teaching, Bei Dao has organized two poetry initiatives in Hong Kong: in 2009, he launched International Poetry Nights in Hong Kong, which, since 2017, has been under the auspices of the Hong Kong Poetry Festival Foundation; he also launched a visiting writer series in cooperation with the Lee Hysan Foundation, which brings two foreign authors to Hong Kong each year and publishes their work in Chinese through Oxford University Press.

== Personal life ==
Bei Dao has one daughter from his first marriage to the artist Shao Fei. He lives with his current wife and their son in Hong Kong. In addition to writing and teaching, he pursues photography, and has exhibited his photographs at the Hong Kong Contemporary Art Museum in Beijing. He also paints, and has exhibited his paintings at the Galerie Paris Horizon in Paris. He turned to painting after suffering a stroke in 2012.

In his essay collections, Bei Dao has written about the many friendships he has made during his travels, including with notable literary figures such as Allen Ginsberg, Susan Sontag, Breyten Breytenbach, Tomas Tranströmer, Gary Snyder, and others.

== Honors ==
Bei Dao has won numerous awards for his writing. Honors bestowed for his body of work include:

- PEN/Barbara Goldsmith Freedom to Write Award (United States, 1990)
- Tucholsky Prize (Sweden, 1990)
- American Academy of Arts and Letters, Honorary Member (1996)
- Guggenheim Fellowship for Creative Arts (United States, 1998)
- Argana International Poetry Award (Morocco, 2002)
- Jeanette Schocken Literary Prize (Germany, 2005)
- Changwon K.C. International Literary Prize (South Korea, 2010)
- Honorary Doctorate, Brown University (2011)
- Cikada Prize (Sweden, 2014)
- Golden Wreath Award of the Struga Poetry Evenings (North Macedonia, 2015)
- Barbara Fields-Siotis Award (Greece, 2020)
- Yakamochi Medal (Japan, 2021)
- Honorary Doctorate, University of Artois (2022)

Since his exile from China, Bei Dao has been mentioned in the press as a contender for the Nobel Prize in Literature, with various sources claiming that he has been nominated for the prize numerous times. On at least one occasion, rumors drew reporters to his home in anticipation that he would win.

In 1996, he was a finalist for the Neustadt International Prize for Literature, and in 2008 he was named a Puterbaugh Fellow at the University of Oklahoma.

Bei Dao has been, and continues to be, a featured speaker at institutions and cultural events around the world, including the Poetry International Festival Rotterdam, the Prague Writers' Festival, the PEN World Voices Festival, and many others. His books have been translated into more than 30 languages, and his poems have been widely anthologized.

== Work ==
Due largely to his personal story, Bei Dao's writing has frequently been viewed through the lens of politics, a practice the poet has positioned himself against, arguing that "true resistance lies in allowing poetry to separate itself from politics, leaving behind the language of states and thus freeing itself from the vicious circle of history". Elsewhere, he has bemoaned that journalists and critics have written about him as a political figure. Yet the prominent scholar of Bei Dao's work, Bonnie S. McDougall, has noted the nuanced relationship of his work to politics: "The central force of Bei Dao's poetry has been his complex reaction to the pressures of a brutalized, conformist, and corrupt society…asserting his individuality in an apolitical mode that was ultimately subversive". As the poet and historian Julian Gewirtz put it, Bei Dao is "a poet of political consequence, if not always quite a political poet".

=== Form ===
The foremost of Bei Dao's methods of subverting literary norms in his native China has been through form. In China, expectations for art and artists were set forth at the 1942 Yan'an Forum on Literature and Art, where Mao Zedong described his view that all art is political and art in China should be connected to, and ultimately uplift, the masses. For poetry, this meant a reliance on classical and folk models with clearly comprehensible verses meant to inspire social morality as well as faith in communism.

By contrast, Bei Dao rarely makes use of conventional poetic forms. As McDougall notes, he has "sought to find new formal devices within the general category of 'free verse'…Conventional but dispensable grammatical forms and punctuation disappear between intensely compressed images; subject, tense, and number are elusive; transitions are unclear; order and logic are supplied by the reader". By using such an experimental approach, Bei Dao has achieved what the poet and critic Michael Palmer has called "a poetry of complex enfoldings and crossings, of sudden juxtapositions and fractures, of pattern in a dance with randomness". Andreas Dorschel sees Bei Dao's work characterized by a poetics of "openness".

This approach to poetic form earned Bei Dao his moniker as a "misty" poet, which was originally leveled pejoratively by Chinese critics who disliked his work for its lack of clarity. Some critics in the West have similarly found his work to be incomprehensible. In response, McDougall places Bei Dao's approach in context: "The so-called obscurity or bizarreness of his writing is…not simply adopted for reasons of expedience but is an emotional necessity" given the milieu in which he began to write. She elaborates that "his verse is not obscure just because of fear of censorship but because the pain caused by all forms of oppression is so intense that conventional epithets are too shallow to express it".

=== Themes ===
Bei Dao's approach to form has been said to reflect his major thematic concerns. Primary among these is his exploration of individuality, often embodied in a presentation of complexity and paradox. Palmer has described the work of Bei Dao—and of all of the Misty Poets—as "a complex interweaving of inner and outer worlds, the private and the public, the personal and the official, the oneiric and the quotidian, the classical and the contemporary". Similarly, the scholar Dian Li argues that Bei Dao's embrace of paradox is rooted in both Western tradition—e.g., Plato's Parmenides—and Eastern tradition—e.g., popular folk tales like one about a blacksmith who creates both an invincible sword and an impenetrable shield—and by placing opposites together, one can arrive at a truth that is "multiple, undifferentiated, and indeterminate". Or, as Bei Dao has said, "There are many principles in the world, and many of these principles contradict each other. Tolerance for the existence of another's principle is the basis for your own existence". By embracing the complexity of the world, in other words, one arrives at individuality. McDougall argues that this preoccupation in Bei Dao's work is "not a pretended or temporary escape from society" but rather "a commitment to non-political communication between people and the realization of the self".

Another of Bei Dao's recurrent themes is language and its recovery from the political realm. According to the scholar Vera Schwarcz, the Cultural Revolution's use of manifestos, slogans, and propaganda, with their underlying threat of oppression and violence, turned even innocent imagery (the sun and sky, for example) into ominous symbols. Bei Dao's project has thus been to reclaim language for the imagination, to create, as the scholar Claudia Pozzana has termed it, "an independent space for poetry". He has done this by expressly rejecting the political co-opting of certain words, as he does in his famous "I don't believe" declarations from "The Answer". In addition, an attempt to reclaim language can be seen in what Schwarcz calls "the stammering quality of Bei Dao's vernacular", through which the short, elusive nature of his verse attempts to mirror his personal experience and challenges political descriptions of the world.

=== Influences ===
Bei Dao has written of the influence on his early work of the Chinese poet Guo Lusheng (also known as "Shi Zhi"), whom he counts as an important precursor to the Misty Poets. In his youth, due to government restrictions and an abbreviated education, his exposure to Western literature was limited. In interviews, he has pointed to the influence of the Spanish modernist poets Federico García Lorca, Rafael Alberti, Vicente Aleixandre, and Antonio Machado, the Russian poets Boris Pasternak and Osip Mandelstam, and in particular the German-language poet Paul Celan.

== Selected bibliography ==
=== Poetry ===
- Notes from the City of the Sun (English publication: 1983)
- The August Sleepwalker (Chinese publication (as Bei Dao's Poetry): 1986; English publication: 1988, 1990)
- Old Snow (English publication: 1991)
- Forms of Distance (English publication: 1994)
- Landscape Over Zero (English publication: 1995)
- Unlock (English publication: 2000)
- The Rose of Time: New and Selected Poems (English publication: 2010)
- Sidetracks (English publication: 2024)

In addition, two books published in English have collected previously published material: At the Sky's Edge (1996) is a re-issue of both Forms of Distance and Landscape Over Zero, and Endure (2011) collects new translations of previously available work.

=== Nonfiction ===
- Blue House (essays, English publication: 2000)
- Midnight's Gate (essays, English publication: 2005)
- Green Lamp (essays, Chinese publication: 2008)
- City Gate, Open Up (memoir, Chinese publication: 2010; English publication: 2017)

=== Fiction ===
- Waves (Chinese publication: 1985; English publication: 1989, 1990)

=== For children ===
Bei Dao is the series editor of the “For Children” series published by CITIC Press.

- Poems for Children (selected by Bei Dao)
- Essays for Children (selected by Li Tuo and Bei Dao)
- Ancient Chinese Poems for Children (selected by Chia-ying Yeh, illustrated by Xu Bing)
- Animal Fables for Children (written and illustrated by Huang Yongyu)
- The Kingdom of Chinese Characters for Children (by Cecilia Lindqvist, translated from the Swedish by LI Zhiyi)
