= Zhu Shuzhen =

Chinese poet

- 朱淑真
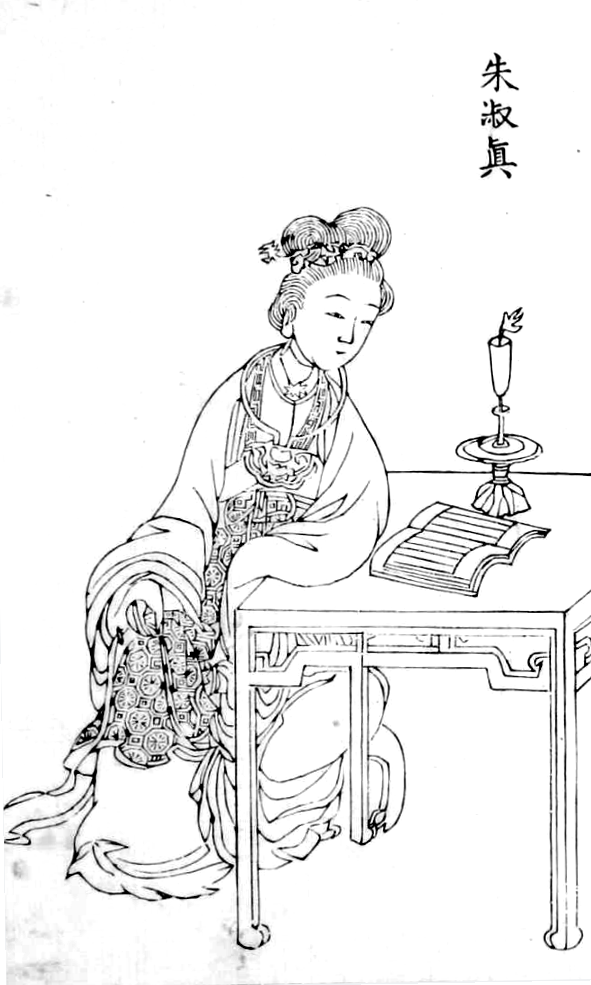
- Born: 1135; Hangzhou, Zhejiang, China
- Died: 1180 (aged 44–45); Hangzhou, Zhejiang, China
- Occupation: Poet
- Notable work: Heartbreaking Verse

Chinese name
- Chinese: 朱淑真
Transcriptions
Standard Mandarin
- Hanyu Pinyin: Zhū Shūzhēn
- Wade–Giles: Chu Shu-chen

Youqi Jushi
- Traditional Chinese: 幽棲居士
- Simplified Chinese: 幽栖居士
Transcriptions
Standard Mandarin
- Hanyu Pinyin: Yōuqī Jūshì

Zhu Shuzhen (Chinese: 朱淑真; c. 1135 – 1180) was a Chinese poet who lived during the Song dynasty. She married an official with whom she had a bad marriage. She either had an affair or committed suicide. After her death, her parents burned poetry that she had written.

There is no firm evidence of Zhu's existence. Her poems were first collected by a twelfth-century official named Wei Duanli, who stated that he happened to hear them in inns in the area of Hangzhou. Although Wei cites a biography by one Wang Tanzuo of Hangzhou, which is not extant, the research of Huang Yanli has established that most of the detailed traditions regarding Zhu first surfaced in the writing of Ming anthologists.

== Poetry ==
Copies of her poetry had already been circulating and 339 shi and 33 ci, written by her could be reconstituted. Her poems dealt with love's sorrows and her collection is called Heartbreaking Verse.

Mist and dew, painfully enticing,
For a moment detain me here.
On the road beside the lake, we hold hands among the lotus plants:
A moment of "yellow plum rain."
I act foolishly, not caring if anyone guesses.
Like an ordinary mortal, for a moment I forget my sorrows.
The moment our hands part, I am overwhelmed,
Returning home, I lean wearily against my dressing table.

— Huang Yanli, Going to the Lake on a Summer's Day, Zhu Shuzhen ji qi zuopin

Since she adopted a few lines from Li Qingzhao's work, it's clear that Zhu Shuzhen was familiar with at least some of her work.
