= Can Xue =

Chinese writer and literary critic (born 1953)

Can Xue 残雪
- Born: Dèng Xiǎohuá; May 30, 1953 (age 73); Changsha, Hunan, China
- Occupations: Novelist; short-story writer; essayist; literary critic
- Writing career
- Language: Chinese
- Period: Contemporary
- Notable works: The Last Lover (2005); Frontier (2008); Vertical Motion (2011); Love in the New Millennium (2018)
- Notable awards: Best Translated Book Award (2015); Huaji World Chinese Literature Award (2022); America Award in Literature (2024)
- Movements: Avant-garde; experimental; stream of consciousness

Deng Xiaohua (Chinese: 邓小华; pinyin: Dèng Xiǎohuá, [tə̂ŋ ɕjàʊxwǎ]; born May 30, 1953), better known by her pen name Can Xue (Chinese: 残雪; pinyin: Cán Xuě, [tsʰǎn ɕuɤ̀]; lit: 'lingering snow'), is a Chinese avant-garde fiction writer and literary critic. Her writing, which consists mostly of short fiction, breaks with the realism of earlier modern Chinese writers. She has also written novels, novellas, and literary criticism of Dante, Jorge Luis Borges, and Franz Kafka. Can Xue has been described as "China's most prominent author of experimental fiction," and most of her fiction has been translated and published in English. She is frequently mentioned as a favourite to win the Nobel Prize in Literature.

== Life ==
Deng Xiaohua was born in 1953, in Changsha, Hunan, China. Her early life was marked by a series of tragic hardships which influenced the direction of her work. She was one of six children born to a man who was once the editor-in-chief of the New Hunan Daily. Her parents, like many intellectuals at the time, were denounced as rightists in the Anti-Rightist Campaign of 1957, despite being Communist Party members themselves. Her father was sent to the countryside for two years in retribution for allegedly leading an anti-Communist Party group at the paper. Two years later, the entire family was evicted from the company housing at the newspaper and moved to a tiny hut below the Yuelu Mountain, on the rural outskirts of Changsha. In the years that followed, the family suffered greatly under further persecution. Her father was jailed, and her mother was sent along with her two brothers to the countryside for re-education through labor. Deng was allowed to remain in the city because of her poor health. After being forced to leave the small hut, she lived alone in a small, dark room under a staircase. By the time of the Cultural Revolution, Deng was thirteen years old. Her formal education was permanently disrupted after completing primary school.

Can Xue describes the horrors of her youth in detail in her memoirs titled "A Summer Day in the Beautiful South" which is included as the foreword to her short story collection Dialogues in Paradise. Throughout this period, her entire family "struggled along on the verge of death". Her grandmother, who raised her while her parents were gone, soon succumbed to hunger and fatigue, dying with severe edema, a grotesque swelling condition. While the family was forced to scavenge food, eventually eating all of the wool clothes in the house, Can Xue contracted a severe case of tuberculosis. Later, she was able to find work as a metalworker. Ten years later, in 1980, after giving birth to her first son, she quit work at the factory. She and her husband then started a small tailoring business at home after teaching themselves to sew.

She began writing in 1983, and published her first short story "Soap Bubbles in Dirty Water" (污水上的肥皂泡) in January 1985. Two other short stories followed that year, "The Bull" (公牛) and "The Hut on the Hill", at which point she chose the pen name Can Xue. This name can be interpreted either as the stubborn, dirty snow left at the end of winter or the remaining snow at the peak of a mountain after the rest has melted. Publishing under a pen name allowed Can Xue to write without revealing her gender. According to Tonglin Lu, a professor of Comparative Literature at the University of Montreal, once critics found out she was a woman, her "subversive voice within the supposedly subversive order [of avant-garde fiction]" made them uncomfortable. Tonglin Lu called this "double subversion".) Not only was she writing avant-garde fiction, but she was also a woman; male writers and critics attempted to analyze her works by psychoanalysis of the author, and some even suggested she was certifiably insane. In 2002, she said, "Lots of [the critics] hate me, or at least they just keep silent, hoping I'll disappear. No one discusses my works, either because they disagree or don't understand."

More recently, however, many critics have paid tribute to her work, drawn to the careful precision she uses to create such a strange, unsettling effect on the reader.

== Work ==
Can Xue's abstract style and unconventional narrative form attracted much attention from critics in the 1990s. A variety of interpretations of her work have been published, but political allegory has been the most popular way of understanding her early short stories. Many of the images in her stories have been linked to the Cultural Revolution, the Anti-Rightist Movement and other turbulent political movements of the early People's Republic of China. However, direct references to these events are uncommon. The author herself explicitly denies most forms of political commentary others claim to have found in her work, stating once in an interview, "There is no political cause in my work."

On the contrary, Can Xue says she treats each story as a kind of life experiment in which she is the subject. "In very deep layers," she says, "all of my works are autobiographical." As for those who struggle to find meaning in her stories, Can Xue says, "If a reader feels that this book is unreadable, then it's quite clear that he's not one of my readers."

Can Xue has also written part of the libretto for at least one opera. In 2010, Can Xue and Lin Wang (web) co-wrote the libretto for a contemporary chamber opera Die Quelle (The Source) commissioned to Lin Wang by Münchener Biennale. The opera is based on Can Xue's published short story "The Double Life". In this opera, a young artist named Jian Yi is deconstructed into different aspects played by different roles. They crosstalk to each other on stage; drying and bubbling-up of the spring symbolize loss and regain of one's own identity. Lin Wang composed the music for Die Quelle (85 minutes in length). Chinese instruments such as the sheng, guzheng and sanxian were used. An unusual feature of the opera is its combination of English pronunciation and Chinese intonation. Die Quelle was premiered on May 9, 2010, at the Munich Biennale and broadcast live.

== Reception ==
American novelist and editor Bradford Morrow has described her as one of the most "innovative and important" authors in contemporary world literature.

American writer and translator Amanda DeMarco stated that the extent to which Can Xue's work is radical is overstated. DeMarco also claims the animals in her novel Frontier "appear in such wild profusion that it would be impossible to assign them a symbology. Can Xue's writing is not metaphorical in this sense. There is no organized system of correspondence or meaning within it that would allow individual elements to be explained back into the realm of the logical. Often her works are compared to performances, to dance, or to visual art." However, the reviewer still described the experience of reading the author's books as rewarding, explaining that the tools of literature used in experimental writing to chart the human being extend beyond the capacities of language as logic. DeMarco said that at "the sentence level, [Frontier] is a wonderful, carefully hewn thing, lucid and pure".

== Awards and honors ==
- 2015 Best Translated Book Award, winner, The Last Lover, translated from the Chinese by Annelise Finegan Wasmoen
- 2019: International Booker Prize, longlisted, Love in the New Millennium (新世纪爱情故事), translated from the Chinese by Annelise Finegan Wasmoen (Yale University Press)
- 2021: International Booker Prize, longlisted, I Live in the Slums, translated from Chinese by Karen Gernant & Chen Zeping (Yale University Press)
- 2022: Huaji World Chinese Literature Award
- 2024: America Award in Literature, for a lifetime contribution to international writing

== Selected bibliography ==
Can Xue has published a large number of novels, novellas, short stories, and book-length commentaries, many of which have been translated into English.

=== Novels ===
Year	Original title	English title	Publisher
1990	突围表演	Breakout Performance	Hong Kong Youth Library
2002	五香街	Five Spice Street	Straits Literature and Art Publishing House
2004	单身女人琐事记实	Trivial Records of Single Women	Beijing October Literature and Art Publishing House
2005	最后的情人	The Last Lover	Huacheng Publishing House
2008	邊疆	Frontier	Shanghai Literature and Art Publishing House
2011	呂芳詩小姐	Miss Lu Fangshi	Shanghai Literature and Art Publishing House
2013	新世纪爱情故事	Love in the New Millennium	Writers Publishing House
2015	黑暗地母的礼物（上）	The Gift of the Dark Earth Mother (Part 1)	Hunan Literature and Art Publishing House
2017	黑暗地母的礼物（下）	The Gift of the Dark Earth Mother (Part 2)	Hunan Literature and Art Publishing House
2019	赤腳醫生	Barefoot Doctor	Hunan Literature and Art Publishing House
2021	水乡	Water Village	Hunan Literature and Art Publishing House
2022	激情世界	The Enchanting Lives of Others	People's Literature Publishing House

=== Novellas ===
Year	Original title	English title	Publisher
1987	黄泥街	Huangni Street	Taiwan Yuanshen Publishing House
1988	天堂里的对话	Conversations in Heaven/Dialogues in Paradise	Writers Publishing House
1990	种在走廊上的苹果树	Apple Tree Planted on the Corridor	Taiwan Vision Publishing House
1994	思想汇报	Ideological Report	Hunan Literature and Art Publishing House
1995	辉煌的日子	Glory Days	Hebei Education Press
2000	奇异的木板房	Strange Wooden Board House	Yunnan People's Publishing House
2000	美丽南方之夏日	Summer in the Beautiful South	Yunnan People's Publishing House
2001	蚊子与山歌	Mosquitoes and Folk Songs	China Literary and Art Circles Publishing Company
2001	长发的遭遇	The Encounter of Long Hair	Chinese Publishing House
2002	松明老师	Teacher Songming	Straits Literature and Art Publishing House
2004	爱情魔方	Love Cube	Ethnic Publishing House
2004	从未描述过的梦境	Dreams Never Described	Writers Press
2005	双重的生活	Double Life	Taiwan Trojan Culture
2006	传说中的宝藏	The Legendary Treasure	Chunfeng Literature and Art Publishing House
2006	暗夜	Dark Night	Chinese Publishing House
2006	末世爱情	Love in the End of the World	Shanghai Literature and Art Publishing House
2021	少年鼓手	Young Drummer	People's Literature Publishing House
2022	西双版纳的女神	The Goddess of Xishuangbanna	People's Literature Publishing House
2023	烟成	City of smoke	Chunfeng Literature and Art Publishing House

=== Essays and non-fiction ===
Year	Original title	English title	Publisher
1999	灵魂的城堡：理解卡夫卡	The Castle of the Soul: Understanding Kafka	Shanghai Literature and Art Publishing House
2000	解读博尔赫斯	Interpreting Borges	People's Literature Publishing House
2000	残雪散文	Can Xue's Prose	Zhejiang Literature and Art Publishing House
2003	地狱的独行者	The Lonely Walker in Hell	Beijing Sanlian Bookstore
2003	艺术复仇	Art Revenge	Guangxi Normal University Press
2003	残雪访谈录	Interviews with Can Xue	Hunan Literature and Art Publishing House
2004	置身绝境的操练	Exercise in Desperate Situations	October Literature and Art Publishing House
2005	温柔的编织工：残雪读卡尔维诺与波赫士	The Gentle Weaver: Can Xue's Reading of Calvino and Borges	Taiwan Border Town Press
2007	残雪文学观	Can Xue's Literary Views	Guangxi Normal University Press
2008	趋光运动：回溯童年的精神图景	Phototaxis Movement: Looking Back at the Spiritual Picture of Childhood	Shanghai Literature and Art Publishing House
2009	黑暗灵魂的舞蹈：残雪美文自选集	Dance of Dark Souls: A Selected Collection of Beautiful Essays by Can Xue	Wenhui Publishing House
2017	残雪文学回忆录	Can Xue's Literary Memoirs	Guangdong People's Publishing House
2023	新叶	New Leaves	Hunan Children's Publishing House

=== Works translated into English ===
==== Novels ====
- 《突围表演》 (1988); later published as 五香街 (2002). Five Spice Street, trans. Karen Gernant and Chen Zeping (Yale, 2009).
- 《最后的情人》 (2005). The Last Lover, trans. Annelise Finegan Wasmoen (Yale, 2014).
- 《边疆》 (2008). Frontier, trans. Karen Gernant and Chen Zeping (Open Letter, 2017).
- 《新世纪爱情故事》 (2013). Love in the New Millennium, trans. Annelise Finegan Wasmoen (Yale, 2018).
- 《赤腳醫生》 (2019). Barefoot Doctor, trans. Karen Gernant and Chen Zeping (Yale, 2022).
- 《激情世界》 (2022). The Enchanting Lives of Others, trans. Annelise Finegan Wasmoen (Yale, 2026).

==== Novellas ====
- 《苍老的浮云》 (1986). Old Floating Cloud.
- 《黄泥街》 (1987). Yellow Mud Street.
- 《种在走廊上的苹果树》 (1987). Apple Tree in the Corridor.
- 《神秘列车之旅》 (published in 2016 in the collection of the same name). Mystery Train, trans. Natascha Bruce (Sublunary Editions, 2022).

==== Short story collections ====
- 《天堂里的对话》 (1988). Dialogues in Paradise, trans. Ronald R. Janssen and Jian Zhang (Northwestern, 1989).

==== Compilations in English ====
- Old Floating Cloud: Two Novellas, trans. Ronald R. Janssen and Jian Zhang (Northwestern, 1991). Compiles Yellow Mud Street and Old Floating Cloud.
- The Embroidered Shoes, trans. Ronald R. Janssen and Jian Zhang (Henry Holt, 1997).
- Blue Light in the Sky and Other Stories, trans. Karen Gernant and Chen Zeping (New Directions, 2006).
- Vertical Motion, trans. Karen Gernant and Chen Zeping (Open Letter, 2011).
- I Live in the Slums, trans. Karen Gernant and Chen Zeping (Yale, 2020).
- Purple Perilla, trans. Karen Gernant and Chen Zeping (ISOLARII, 2021).
- Mother River, trans. Karen Gernant and Chen Zeping (Open Letter, 2025).
