= Chen Minghua =

Chinese poet

- 陈明华
- Born: December 1950 (age 75); Wuqingyuan, Zhengning, Gansu, China
- Occupations: poet, essayist, translator

Chinese name
- Traditional Chinese: 陳明華
- Simplified Chinese: 陈明华
Transcriptions
Standard Mandarin
- Hanyu Pinyin: Chén Mínghuá

Chen Minghua (simplified Chinese: 陈明华; traditional Chinese: 陳明華; pinyin: Chén Mínghuá; born December 1950), also known as Chen Mo, is a Chinese poet, essayist and translator. He is a member of the Chinese Writers Association, chairman of the Qingyang Writers Association, and editor-in-chief of Beidou Magazine.

== Biography ==
Chen was born in December 1950 in Wuqingyuan, a small town in Zhengning County, Gansu. After graduating from high school in 1970, he joined the army, became a member of the Chinese Communist Party and served as an engineer for four years, during which time he began to study poetry. Since the age of 20, Chen loved literature and have a special liking for art of poetry.

Chen began publishing his works in 1970 in domestic and foreign newspapers and magazines such as "Mass Literature and Art", "Baoji Literature and Art" and the military newspaper "People's Army Daily". In 1973, he published his first debut collection I Stand Guard on National Day Night.

In 1975, he retired from the army and returned to his hometown. After working in the countryside, he kept writing poems. Soon, he was hired as a cadre by Zhengning County Cultural Center. During this period, in addition to devoting himself to the creation of local poems, he also began to write political lyric poems. He created a large number of passionate political lyric poems, which were published in "Gansu Daily" and "Gansu Literature and Art", and were selected into relevant books published by People's Literature Publishing House.

In 1980, Chen's collection Memories of the Motherland won the third prize in the first Gansu Province Excellent Literature Award. In 1983, he won the Feitian Literature Award for My Family on the Plateau, and in 1986, the essay Dreams of Three Dangerous Mountains won the Excellence Award in the "Ideal and Pioneering" Essay Competition organized by Gansu People's Broadcasting Station. In 1994, he won the first prize of the "Insurance Cup" National Poetry Competition.

In 2000, "Xueluohuan County North" won the third prize of Gansu Province's Dunhuang Literature and Art Award and won the third "Five One Project Award" in Qinyang. He has won the Qingyang City "Five One Project" Award many times, and served as the director of the jury of the first to sixth sessions of the Qingyang Dragon Boat Festival. In addition, the poems Maojing, Hui'an Fort and Snow in Ejina were selected by "Selected Chinese Poetry in 2000", "Best Chinese Poetry in 2000" and "Selected Chinese Poetry in 2001" respectively.

He published nearly a thousand poems in numerous literary magazines and many poetry collections, including Five-Colored Flowers, Huiyang Season, Listening to Hometown and Wind Blowing in the Western Regions. His poems have been included in the national middle school students' general Chinese textbook. His poetic style has transformed from cold beauty to tranquil beauty, and has penetrated from the countryside to the frontier. He has a huge influence on the formation and development of the Qinyang poetry scene and is a famous contemporary poet.

== Awards and honours ==
- 1980: Gansu Province Excellent Literature Award
- 1994: "Insurance Cup" National Poetry Prize
- 2000: Dunhuang Literature and Art Award

== Publications ==
- I Stand Guard on National Day Night [国庆之夜我站岗]
- Memories of the Motherland [祖国的怀念]
- My Family on the Plateau [我高原上的一家]
- Dreams of Three Dangerous Mountains [梦萦三危山]
- Huiyang Season [惠阳季]
- Spring Blossoms [春暖花开]
- Snow Falling Around the North of the County [雪落环县北]
- Neighboring with Shuofang [与朔方为邻]
- Walking around Shuofang [走遍朔方]
- West Wind Blowing Snow [西风吹雪]
- Wind Blowing Qinghai [风吹青海]
- Five-Colored Flowers [五色花]
- Returning to the Sun [回阳时节]
- Listening to Hometown [聆听乡土]
- Wind Blowing in the Western Regions [风吹西域]
