= Wang Yun (Qing dynasty) =

Chinese poet and playwright

Wang Yun (1749–1819) was a Chinese poet and playwright during the Qing Dynasty.

Her birthplace is Chang'an. In her poems she writes about the frustration of educated women, who were not allowed to have a career, nor were they accepted by men as intellectual equals. The Huaiqing Tang ji contains over 200 of her poems. She also wrote three chuanqi plays; Fanhua meng (Dream of Glory), Quan fu ji (Complete Happiness) and You xian meng (A Dream Visit to the Immortals).

== Sources ==
- "Wang Yun", Renditions, a Chinese-English Translation Magazine, last accessed June 9, 2007, via web.archive.org
