= Duo Duo =

Chinese poet

Duo Duo 多多
- Born: Li Shizheng; 1951 (age 74–75); Beijing, PRC
- Occupation: Poet
- Writing career
- Period: Contemporary
- Genre: Poetry
- Notable works: Looking Out From Death, The Boy Who Catches Wasps
- Notable awards: Neustadt International Prize for Literature
- Literary movement: Misty Poets

Duo Duo or Duoduo (Chinese: 多多, born 1951) is the pen name of contemporary Chinese poet, Li Shizheng (栗世征), a prominent exponent of the Chinese Misty Poets (朦胧诗). Duo Duo was awarded the 2010 Neustadt International Prize for Literature.

== Biography ==
Duo Duo was born in Beijing, China. As a youth in the Cultural Revolution, he was sent down to the countryside in Baiyangdian (白洋淀), where he began reading and writing poetry. Several of his schoolmates would also become famous as members of the underground poetry movement described as "Misty" by the authorities: Bei Dao, Gu Cheng and Mang Ke.

Duo Duo's early poems are short and elliptical, in which some see barbed political references. In his early poems, there are numerous intertextual links to Western poets such as Charles Baudelaire, Marina Tsvetaeva and Sylvia Plath. His style underwent a shift in the mid-1980s to longer, more philosophical poetry. In contrast to the clipped, image-based style of Bei Dao, Duo Duo tended to use longer, more flowing lines, and paid more attention to sound and rhetoric. Some of his poems border on the essayistic, such as the 1984 Lessons also translated as Instruction (诲教), which spoke for China's "lost generation" as much as Bei Dao's Answer.

In 1989, Duo Duo having been witness to the Tiananmen Square protests of 1989, as fortune had it was booked on a plane on 4 June to London where he was due to give a poetry reading at the British Museum. He went on to live for many years in the UK, Canada, and the Netherlands. His poetic language went through another shift, taking up the themes of exile and rootlessness. In the absence of a Chinese-speaking community, Duo Duo began to use the Chinese language more self-consciously. Sometimes his poems border on the impenetrable yet are highly effective, such as the poem Watching the Sea (看海).

In 2004, Duo Duo returned to China and began to teach at Hainan University.

== Awards ==
In 2009, a jury representing nine countries selected Duo Duo as the 2010 winner of the $50,000 Neustadt International Prize for Literature, making him the award's 21st laureate and the first Chinese author to win the prize. He is also associated with many respected Chinese literary festivals and awards, such as Yinchuan Poetry Prize and others.

== Translations ==
The author and academic Gregory B. Lee has translated many of Duo Duo's poems into English, and has written about the poet's work, most recently in his book China's Lost Decade.

Jin Zhong 金重( Jone Guo, USA) was also one of the earliest translators of Duo Duo's poetry. A good selection of the translations was published by American Poetry Review in 1993, which became a milestone for Chinese poetry published in this magazine.
