= America Award in Literature =

America Award
- Awarded for: A lifetime contribution to international writing
- Date: annual
- Country: United States
- Presented by: Contemporary Arts Educational Project (in loving memory of Anna Fahrni)
- First award: 1994
- Website: www.greeninteger.com/america.cfm

The America Award is a lifetime achievement literary award for international writers. It describes itself as a modest attempt at providing alternatives to the Nobel Prize in Literature. It was first presented in 1994. The award does not entail any prize money. It is sponsored by the Contemporary Arts Educational Project, Inc., in loving memory of Anna Fahrni, and by the publisher Green Integer.

== Judges ==
Each year, the judges comprise a rotating panel of six to eight poets, prose writers, playwrights and literary critics. The chairman is Douglas Messerli.

== Recipients ==
- 1994 – Aimé Césaire [Martinique]
- 1995 – Harold Pinter [UK]
- 1996 – José Donoso [Chile] (awarded prior to his death)
- 1997 – Friederike Mayröcker [Austria]
- 1998 – Rafael Alberti [Spain] (awarded prior to his death)
- 1999 – Jacques Roubaud [France]
- 2000 – Eudora Welty [USA]
- 2001 – Inger Christensen [Denmark]
- 2002 – Peter Handke [Austria]
- 2003 – Adonis [Syria/Lebanon]
- 2004 – José Saramago [Portugal]
- 2005 – Andrea Zanzotto [Italy]
- 2006 – Julien Gracq (Louis Poirier) [France]
- 2007 – Paavo Haavikko [Finland]
- 2008 – John Ashbery [USA]
- 2009 – Günter Kunert [Germany]
- 2010 – Javier Marías [Spain]
- 2011 – Ko Un [South Korea]
- 2012 – Ivo Michiels [Belgium]
- 2013 – Reiner Kunze [GDR/Germany]
- 2014 – László Krasznahorkai [Hungary]
- 2015 – Edward Albee [USA]
- 2016 – César Aira [Argentina]
- 2017 – Tom Stoppard [Czechoslovakia/UK]
- 2018 – Haruki Murakami [Japan]
- 2019 – Nicole Brossard [Canada]
- 2020 – Mario Vargas Llosa [Peru]
- 2021 – Rosmarie Waldrop [Germany/USA]
- 2022 – Gerhard Rühm [Austria]
- 2023 – Ismail Kadare [Albania]
- 2024 – Can Xue [China]
- 2025 – Charles Bernstein [USA]
- 2026 – Mutsuo Takahashi [Japan]
