= Misty Poets =

Chinese poetry group

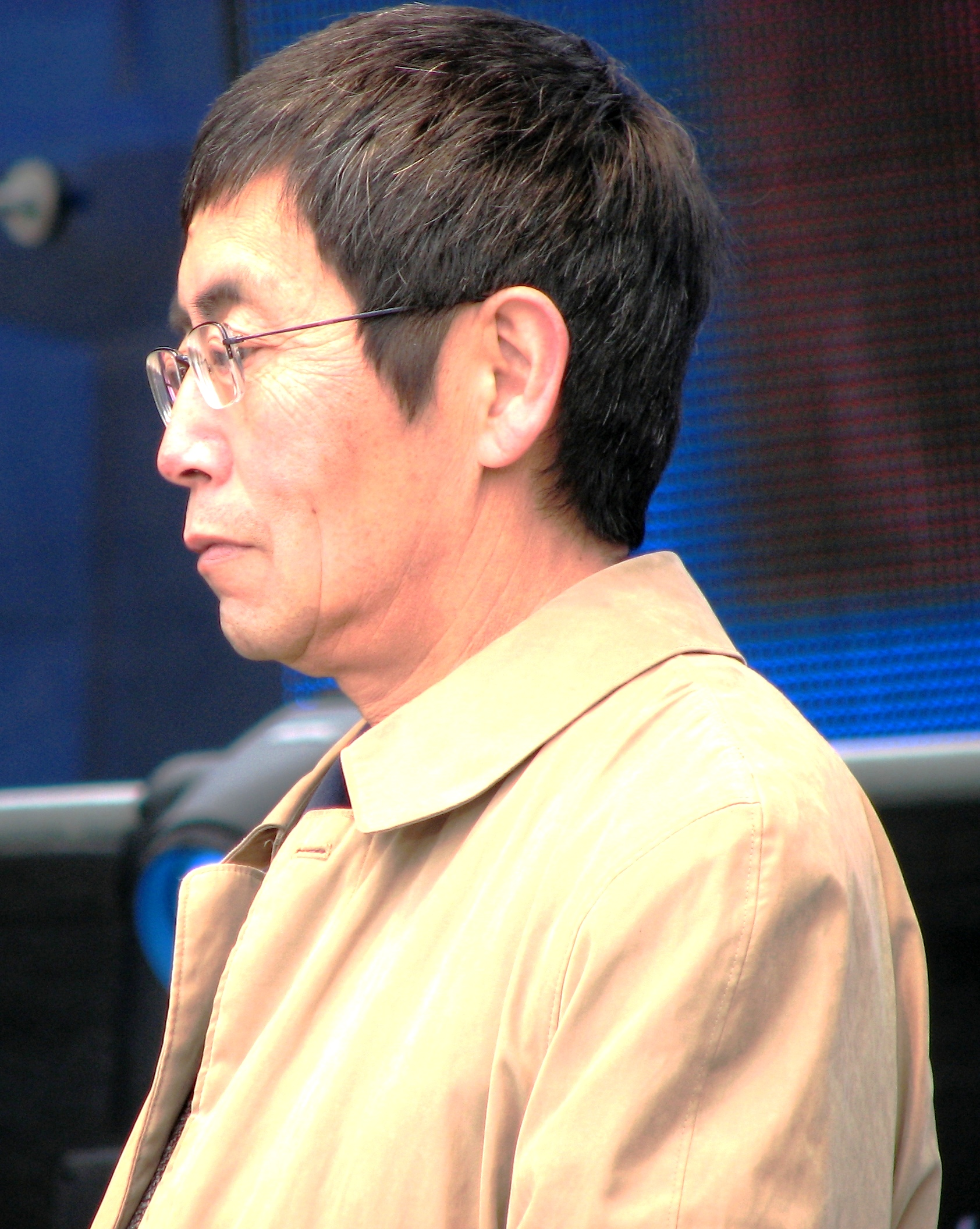
Founding member Bei Dao performing in Grand Slam, Tallinn Freedom Square

The Misty Poets (Chinese: 朦胧诗人; pinyin: Ménglóng Shīrén) are a group of 20th-century Chinese poets who reacted against the restrictions on art during the Cultural Revolution. They are so named because their work has been officially denounced as "obscure", "misty", or "hazy" poetry (menglong shi). But according to Gu Cheng, "the defining characteristic of this new type of poetry is its realism—it begins with objective realism but veers towards a subjective realism; it moves from a passive reaction toward active creation." The movement was initially centered on the magazine Jintian, which was founded by Bei Dao and Mang Ke and published from 1978 until 1980, when it was banned.

Guo Lusheng was one of the earliest poets of the sent-down youth generation and served as an inspiration for several of the original Misty Poets. Five important misty poets, Bei Dao, Gu Cheng, Shu Ting, He Dong and Yang Lian, were exiled after the Tiananmen Square protests of 1989. Jintian was resurrected in Sweden in 1990 as a forum for expatriate Chinese writers.

The work of the Misty Poets has had a strong influence on the lyrics of China's first generation of rock musicians, particularly Cui Jian.

== History ==
During the Cultural Revolution (1966–1976), Mao Zedong decreed certain cultural requirements for literature and art in China. According to these ideas, writers and artists were encouraged to form a "cultural army" to educate the masses and provide them with revolutionary values. All art would therefore be political and there was no art for art's sake. According to these requirements, the poetry was relatively compliant and realistic, as the following example shows:

The moon follows the earth,
The earth follows the sun,
Oil follows our steps,
And we shall always follow the Communist Party.

In the civil war–like state at the end of the Cultural Revolution, many Chinese were sent to the country under the slogan "Up to the mountains and down to the countryside" (Chinese: 上山下乡 shàngshānxiàxiāng). The discontent of the deportees was great and many felt disillusioned after the Cultural Revolution, which was described as the "Ten Lost Years" afterwards across the country. Although it was banned during the Cultural Revolution to publish literature and art, an extensive underground poetry circulated, which was written under extreme conditions:

Gu Cheng (Chinese: 顾城 Gu Cheng) says that he started his poems in a pigsty. Bei Dao (Chinese: 北岛) wrote his first plays in the evening after work. Only with the death of Mao Zedong, the arrest of the Gang of Four, as well as an opening to the west, did the "cultural requirement" laws loosen. The unofficial magazine Jintian offered a platform for these feelings and poems. The first issue was published with the seminal poem "The Answer" (Chinese: 回答 pinyin: huí dá), which can be regarded as a paradigm for the obscure nature of misty poetry. The line "I do not believe" (Chinese: 我不相信; pinyin: wǒ bù xiāng xìn) here almost became a buzzword at the time. The publication of further Menglong poems immediately initiated a year-long debate on the freedom of the individual and the author and his commitment to society, the state, and the party.

The group influenced Uyghur poets like Ahmatjan Osman, a leader in the gungga (hazy, vague, or uncertain) movement of the 1980s. The movement had several lasting impacts on Uyghur poetics, such as the introduction of free verse.

== List of Misty Poets ==
- Bei Dao
- Bei Ling
- Chou Ping
- Duo Duo
- Fei Ye
- Gu Cheng
- Ha Jin
- He Dong
- Jiang He
- Mang Ke
- Shu Ting
- Tang Yaping
- Xi Chuan
- Yan Li
- Yang Lian
- Zhang Zhen
