= Liang Huang =

Tang dynasty poet

Liang Huang (梁鍠) (fl. 742–756) was a Tang dynasty poet who lived during the reign of Emperor Xuanzong of Tang.
