= Tianxin Cai =

Chinese mathematician and poet

Cai Tianxin
- Born: March 3, 1963 (age 63); Taizhou, Zhejiang, China
- Education: Shandong University
- Scientific career
- Fields: Mathematician
- Workplaces: Hangzhou University; Zhejiang University

Cai Tianxin (Chinese: 蔡天新, born March 3, 1963, in Taizhou, Zhejiang) is a Chinese mathematician, poet, and essayist noted for his books Mathematical Legends, A Brief History of Mathematics, Mathematics an Arts, A Modern Introduction to Classical Number Theory, Little memory: my Childhood in Mao’s Time, etc. He is a professor in the Mathematical School of Zhejiang University.

== Early life and education ==
Cai was born in Taizhou, Zhejiang Province. He spent his childhood around 7 villages and one small town in southeastern China. He gained bachelor (1982), master (1984) and doctorate (1987) degrees at Shandong University, and his doctoral advisor was Pan Chengdong (潘承洞), whose supervisor Ming Shihe got Ph.D. in University of Oxford under the direct of E. C. Titchmarch. Cai became full professor in Hangzhou University in 1994, and full professor in Zhejiang University since 1998.

== Research interests ==
Additive and multiplicative number theory, perfect numbers, congruence modulo integer power, Witten zeta values; history of mathematics, history of arts.

== Writing and Publications ==
Cai has published more than 30 books of poetry, essays, travels, photograph, autobiography, popular mathematics and number theory. His work has been translated into more than 20 languages, and he has published more than 20 books worldwide. He has translated or edited 8 volumes of modern world poetry. He was selected by Herinrich and Jane Ledig-Rowohlt Foundation as a resident writer at the Chateau de Lavigny, Switzerland in 2007, a guest of the Arabic Capital of Culture in Baghdad, Iraq in 2014, and participated the International Writing Program in Iowa, USA in 2018.

== Books ==
- Song of the quiet life, translated by Robert Berold and Cai Tianxin, Deep South, South Africa, 2005.
- Every Cloud Has Its Own Name, translated by Robert Berold and Cai Tianxin, 1-plus, San Francisco, 2017.
- The Book of Numbers, World Scientific, Singapore, 2018.
- A Modern Introduction to Classical Number Theory, World Scientific, Singapore, 2018.
- Perfect Numbers and Fibonacci Sequences, translated by Tyer Ross, World Scientific, Singapore, 2022.
- A Brief History of Mathematics, translated by Tyer Ross, to appear in Springer Nature, New York.

== Awards and honors ==
- Naji Naaman Literary Prize for Poetry, Beirut, 2013
- China’s National Science and Technology Award, Beijing, 2018
- Kathak Literary Award for Poetry, Dakar, 2019
- Dang Dang Award for Influential Writer, Beijing, 2022
