= Yao Shouzhong =

Chinese poet

Yao Shouzhong (姚守中) was a Chinese poet of the Yuan dynasty. He is thought to have been from the city of Luoyang in present Henan. His dates are unclear. However, he seems to have been the nephew of the writer and official Yao Sui (姚燧) who lived from 1238 to 1313. Yao Shouzhong would then have lived in the early 14th century. Likewise, this Yao Sui was himself the nephew of the celebrated official and scholar Yao Shu (1203–1280). The greater family had its origins in the province of Liaoning and later moved to Luoyang. Yao Shouzhong appears to have been a local official functionary in Pingjiang in Hunan. The Lu Guibu (彔鬼簿) notes only that Yao was a literary talent from the previous generation. "The Ox’s Grievance" (牛訴冤; Niu Suyuan) is the only surviving literary work of the writer, although titles of the three of his plays have survived. Tao’s sanqu suite, "The Ox’s Grievance", is a classic of the genre and is one of the great imaginative poems in the genre of sanqu poetry and Chinese literature as a whole. Although it has been suggested that "The Ox's Grievance" is a social satire, more likely it was intended as a literary burlesque or parody.
