= Fei Ye =

Chinese poet

- Born: 1962 (age 63–64); Harbin, Heilongjiang, China
- Occupation: Writer

Fei Ye (Chinese: 菲野; born 1962) is a Chinese poet who was also involved in the Chinese democracy movement. Although often associated with the Misty Poets, he considers himself of a younger generation and dismisses the label. Fei has published four underground books of poetry and translated two books of Russian poetry, including the work of Osip Mandelstam. He lives in the United States after being exiled from China.

== Biography ==
He was born in Harbin, Heilongjiang (Black Dragon River) in the northernmost province of China.

Fei began editing the banned literary journal Lone Army. He was arrested in 1983 when a Communist Party loyalist had spotted him editing in a classroom in Harbin.

Fei fled China in 1987 with the help of the American Embassy. As an exile, he moved to Berkeley, California. In 1989, he founded the organization "Chinese Writers in Exile" in Berkeley. Fei Ye's poems The Curse and The Poet in America were written while in America.
