= Mang Ke =

Chinese poet

- Born: China
- Occupation: Poet

Mang Ke (芒克, original name Jiang Shiwei), born in 1951, is a prominent Chinese poet and co-founder (with Bei Dao) of the underground literary journal Jintian (Today), which appeared irregularly between 1978 and 1980 before being shut down by the Chinese Government.

Considered a member of the Misty Poets, Mang Ke's works were never officially recognized and appeared primarily as photocopies.

Mang Ke is also an accomplished painter.

== Interviews ==
In 2015, he was interviewed by the Franco-Chinese online channel CAP33.
