= Gu Cheng =

Chinese poet (1956–1993)

- Born: September 24, 1956; Beijing, China
- Died: October 8, 1993 (aged 37); Ostend, Waiheke Island, Auckland, New Zealand
- Occupation: Writer
- Writing career
- Language: Mandarin Chinese
- Period: Contemporary
- Genres: Poetry; novel; essay
- Movements: Misty Poets; modernism

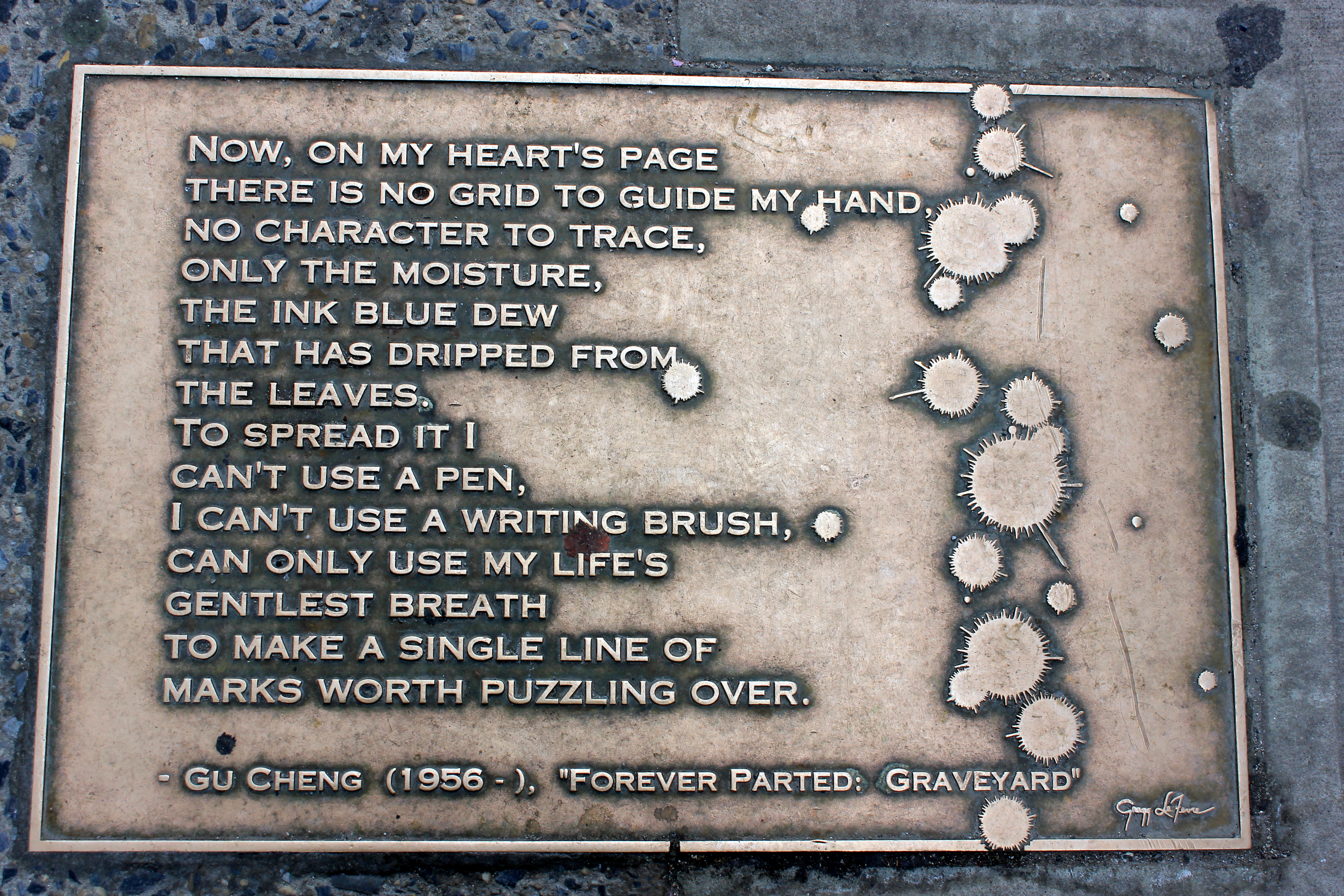
Plaque in New York

Gu Cheng (simplified Chinese: 顾城; traditional Chinese: 顧城; September 24, 1956 – October 8, 1993) was a famous Chinese modern poet, essayist and novelist. He was a prominent member of the "Misty Poets", a group of Chinese modernist poets.

== Biography ==
Gu Cheng was born in Beijing on 24 September 1956. He was the son of a prominent party member and the army poet Gu Gong. At the age of twelve, his family was sent to rural Shandong because of the Cultural Revolution (as means of re-education) where they bred pigs. There, he claimed to have learned poetry directly from nature.

In the late 1970s, Gu became associated with the journal Today (Jintian) which began a movement in poetry known as "menglong" 朦胧 meaning "hazy", "obscure". He became an international celebrity and travelled around the world accompanied by his wife, Xie Ye. The two settled in Rocky Bay, a small village on Waiheke Island, Auckland, New Zealand in 1987. Gu taught Chinese at the University of Auckland in the City of Auckland.

In October 1993, Gu Cheng attacked his wife with an axe before hanging himself. She died later on the way to a hospital. The story of his death was widely covered in the Chinese media.

== "A Generation" ==
The two-line poem titled "A Generation" ("一代人") was perhaps Gu Cheng's most famous contribution to contemporary Chinese literature. It had been considered an accurate representation of the younger generation during the Chinese Cultural Revolution seeking knowledge and future.

(translated by Juan Yuchi)
The darkest night gave me dark-colored eyes
Yet with them I'm seeking light

黑夜给了我黑色的眼睛
我却用它寻找光明

"The defining characteristic of this new type of poetry is its realism. It begins with objective realism but veers towards a subjective realism; it moves from a passive reaction toward active creation." - Gu Cheng

== Legacy ==
Gu Cheng's life was dramatized in the 1998 film The Poet (Chinese: 顧城別戀; pinyin: gùchéng bié liàn), which focused on his recurrent depression and the murder of his wife.
