= Yang Lian (poet) =

Swiss-Chinese poet (born 1955)

- 楊煉
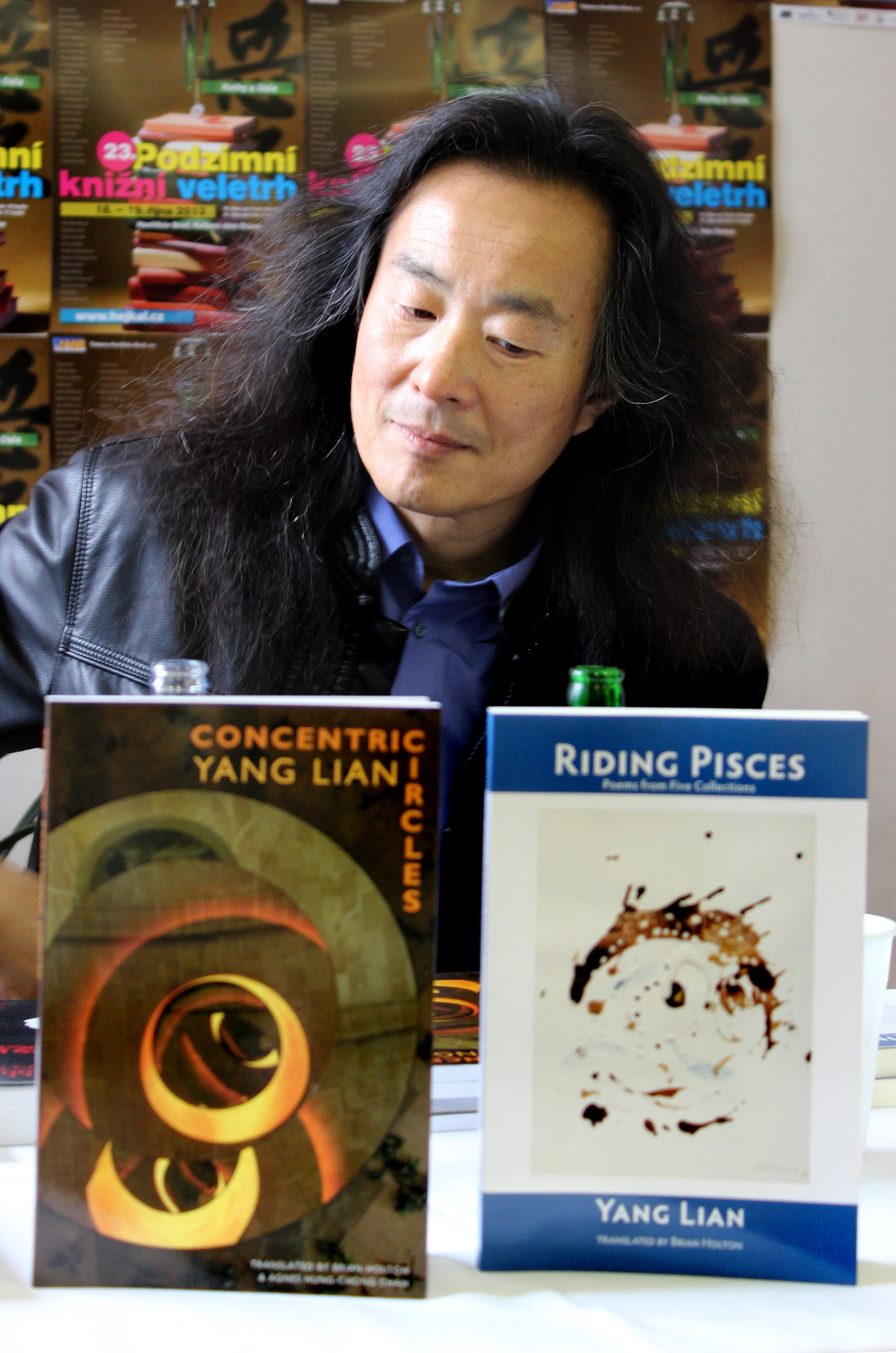
- Yang Lian, 2013
- Born: 22 February 1955 (age 71); Bern, Switzerland
- Occupation: Poet
- Writing career
- Language: Mandarin Chinese
- Period: Contemporary
- Genre: Poetry
- Literary movement: Misty Poets, Searching for Roots School

Yang Lian (Chinese: 楊煉 Yáng Liàn; born 22 February 1955) is a Swiss-Chinese poet associated with the Misty Poets and also with the Searching for Roots school. He was born in Bern, Switzerland, in 1955 and was raised in Beijing, China. where he attended primary school.

His education was interrupted by the outbreak of the Cultural Revolution after 1966. In 1974, he was sent to Changping county near Beijing to undergo "re-education through labor", where he undertook a variety of tasks including digging graves. In 1977, after the Cultural Revolution had ended and Mao Zedong had died, Yang returned to Beijing, where he worked with the state broadcasting service.

== Early career ==
Yang began writing traditional Chinese poetry while working in the countryside, despite this genre of poetry being officially proscribed under the rule of Mao Zedong. In 1979, he became involved with the group of poets writing for 'Today' (Jintian) magazine, and his style of poetry developed into the modernist, experimental style common within that group.

The "Today" group attracted considerable controversy during the early 1980s, and the initially derogatory term of "Misty Poets" was applied to them at this time. In 1983, Yang's poem "Norlang" (the name of a waterfall in Tibet) was criticised as part of the Anti-Spiritual Pollution Campaign, and a warrant was put out for his arrest. He managed to escape after a tip-off from friends; the campaign ended shortly afterwards.

== Post-1989 ==
Yang Lian was invited to become a visiting scholar by the University of Auckland in February 1989. Yang Lian was in Auckland, New Zealand, at the time of the 1989 Tiananmen Square protests and massacre, and was involved with protests against the actions of the Chinese government. His work was blacklisted in China shortly after 4 June 1989, and two books of his poetry awaiting publication there were pulped. Since then, he became a Chinese poet in exile in New Zealand.

Yang Lian has published fifteen collections of poems, two collections of poetical prose, many essays and one big book of autobiographical prose in Chinese. He has translated all George Orwell's fiction works into Chinese (not published yet because of the censorship in China very recently). His latest book in English is The Third Shore, the anthology of Chinese–English poets' mutual translation (co-editor W. N. Herbert), published by Shearsman Books (UK), and Eastern Chinese Normal University Press](China), 2013. His latest book-length poem was titled Narrative Poem, an autobiographical poem.

Yang Lian has held writers' fellowships in Australia, United States, Italy and Germany, and has travelled broadly. Although he has retained New Zealand citizenship (1993), and later became a British citizen (2008) too. he has lived in London since 1997, and he lives in Berlin and London now.

Yang Lian was a fellow of Wissenschaftskolleg in Berlin for 2012 / 2013. he is a guest professor of Nanjing University of the Arts, The Arts College of Hebei University and Yangzhou University. Since 2014, he has been invited to be a distinguished professor and a writer in residency at Shantou University, Guangdong Province, China. In 2013, he was invited to become a member of The Norwegian Academy for Literature and Freedom of Expression. Along with fellow Misty Poets, he has reportedly been nominated for the Nobel Prize for Literature. In 2024, he received the Zbigniew Herbert International Literary Award having been described as "one of China’s most eminent living poets and an unwavering freedom of speech campaigner".

Since 2005, he is professor at European Graduate School in Saas-Fee, Switzerland, and artistic director of the Unique Mother Tongue series of international poetry-arts events held periodically in London. Since 2017, Yang Lian, together with Mang Ke and Tang Xiaodu, republished the online magazine Survivors Poetry , as one of two chief editors.

== Works and collections (in English) ==
- Dead in Exile. a collection of Poems. Translated by Mabel Lee. Tiananmen Editions (1990)
- Masks & Crocodile, a collection of poems. Translated by Mabel Lee. Wild Peony Ltd (1990)
- Where the Sea Stands Still - New Poems by Yang Lian. Translated by Brian Holton, Newcastle: Bloodaxe Books (1999)
- Non-Person Singular: Collected Shorter Poems of Yang Lian. Translated by Brian Holton, London: WellSweep Press (1994)
- YI, a book-length poem. Translated by Mabel Lee. published Green Integer (2002)
- Concentric Circles. Translated by Brian Holton and Agnes Hung-Chong Chan, Tarset: Bloodaxe Books (2005)
- Notes of a Blissful Ghost. Translated by Brian Holton, Hong Kong:Renditions Paperbacks (2002)
- Unreal City (2006)
- Riding Pisces: Poems from Five Collections. Translated by Brian Holton, Exeter: Shearsman (2008)
- Lea Valley Poems. a collection of poems. Translated by Brian Holton and others. Bloodaxe Book, UK (2009)
- Jade Ladder, an anthology of Contemporary Chinese Poetry in English translation (edited by Yang Lian, W N Herbert, Brian Holton and Qin Xiaoyu). Bloodaxe Books (2012)
- Narrative Poem. a book-length poem. Translated by Brian Holton, Published by Bloodaxe Book, UK. (2016)
- Venice Elegy, a sequence of poems. Translated by Brian Holton. published by Damocle Edizioni, Italy. (2018)
- Anniversary Snow, a collection of poems. translated by Brian Holton and others. published by Shearsman Books, UK (2019)
- 威尼斯哀歌, Venice Elegy, Elegia Veneziana. Translated by Brian Holton and Federico Picerni, Venice:Damocle Edizioni (2019)
- A tower built downwards, translated by Brian Holton. Published by Bloodaxe (2023)
- Various authors (2023). Jarquín, Carlos Javier (ed.). Canto planetario: hermandad en la Tierra. Costa Rica: HC Editores. ISBN 979-8850092115.

The books of translated Yang Lian's poems in other languages include German, French, Italian, Japanese, Danish, Swedish, Slovenian, Arabic, Portuguese, Hungarian, among others.

== Artist's books ==
- Venice Elegy: Poems by Yang Lian (Translated by Brian Holton) and Ai Weiwei’s visual images, Venice: Damocle Edizioni (2018)

This edition of Yang Lian's poems and Ai Weiwei's visual images was realized by the publishing house Damocle Edizioni – Venice in 200 numbered copies on Fabriano Paper. The book was printed in Venice, in May 2018. Every book is hand-signed by Yang Lian and Ai Weiwei.
