= Modern Chinese poetry =

Modern Chinese poetry, including new poetry (traditional Chinese: 新詩; simplified Chinese: 新诗; pinyin: xīnshī), refers to post Qing dynasty (1644 to 1912) Chinese poetry, including the modern vernacular (baihua) style of poetry increasingly common with the New Culture and 4 May 1919 movements, with the development of experimental styles such as "free verse" (as opposed to the traditional Chinese poetry written in Classical Chinese language); but, also including twentieth and twenty-first century continuations or revivals of Classical Chinese poetry forms. Some modern Chinese poetry represents major new and modern developments in the poetry of one of the world's larger areas, as well as other important areas sharing this linguistic affinity. One of the first poets and theorist in the modern Chinese poetry mode was Hu Shih (1891–1962).

== Background ==
The historical and linguistic background to modern Chinese poetry involves a long Classical Chinese poetry tradition, written or chanted in specialized, literary forms versus modern changes both in vernacular varieties of Chinese as well as the development of and exposure to various other poetic traditions from modern Europe and the United States, both directly and indirectly through Japanese literary sources. Thus, one important change in the history of Chinese poetry involves the revaluation of the use of Classical Chinese literary language and the traditions of Classical Chinese poetry. Another is the more global phenomenon of modernism in poetry, involving rejecting traditional poetic forms and styles in favor of experimental developments and novelties.

=== Varieties of Chinese ===
Modern Chinese poetry has been written and spoken in different varieties of the Chinese language. Traditionally, much poetry was written in Classical or Literary Chinese. Some modern poetry is still so written. Also used in Chinese poetry are other varieties of Chinese, such as Standard Chinese and other types of Mandarin Chinese, Cantonese, Min Nan, Hakka, and Shanghainese.

=== Socio-political change ===
Modern Chinese poetry developed within a context of major socio-political changes, and some of the poets were directly involved with these as members or leaders of some of the parties involved in consciously influencing the course of historical developments. The nineteenth century had been one of upset to traditional Chinese ideas and institutions, as China went through a period of successive loss of sovereign control and self-determination as a nation and internal struggles for political power of an often violent military nature. The First Opium War (1839–42) fought between Great Britain and China resulted in the Treaty of Nanking (1842), which ceded Chinese control of five treaty ports and all of Hong Kong Island to the British. After the Second Opium War (1856 to 1860), the First Sino-Japanese War (1894–1895), and other conflicts China had lost control of important parts of its territory to Britain, France, the United States, Japan, Russia, Portugal, Germany, and other colonial powers, which are documented in a series of unequal treaties: these areas included all of Taiwan and many of the most important eastern cities. In the meantime, various rebellions (or civil war) arose, included among other rebellions in the Qing dynasty were the Taiping Rebellion (1850 to 1864) and the Boxer Rebellion (1898–1901), and although the latter of which was largely directed against foreign powers and influence, both showed the weakness of the Qing court. These nineteenth century events in China resulted in an aftermath in which tens of millions of the population had died during the various conflicts, a significant part of the cultural legacy of China having been looted or destroyed (for example the Old Summer Palace and its contents, including the burning of the library), and that the Qing government increasingly having been viewed as less and less viable as a political institution, together with the Qing experiencing a demonstrable and ongoing erosion of territorial control.

During the final years of the Qing dynasty poets, such as Gong Zizhen (1792–1841) continued work in the traditional Classical Chinese poetry modes, as did Huang Zunxian (1848–1905), though some changes as a reaction to events including poetic evaluation of foreign places, cultures, and ideas can be seen in Huang's works. Gong Zizhen was quite disturbed by the condition of the empire, and Huang Zunxian traveled widely in the course of his diplomatic duties, including to Japan, the United States, London, and Singapore. Such experiences and the associated poetry would prove to be harbingers of the development of modern Chinese poetry in the twentieth century, and into the first part of the twenty-first century.

== Early twentieth century ==
The early poetry of the twentieth century in China was written "in an atmosphere of great uncertainty...but of some excitement." Twentieth century events in China which had a major importance from the perspective of poetry include the Xinhai Revolution (1911–1912) and the end of Qing (1912), the establishment of the Republic of China (1912–1949), the Chinese Civil War (1927–1950) fought between the Kuomintang and the Chinese Communist Party as major belligerents, the Second Sino-Japanese War and the occupation by Japan of large parts of China (1937–1945), and the establishment of People's Republic of China (1949). In the early years of the century, the Qing government clearly was not sustainable as an ongoing institution, at least without major reform. Opinion and intrigue were heavy, with the formation or existence of various parties, opinions, and secret societies. The poets did not fail to weigh in. The Southern Society (Nanshe), formed in 1909, opposed the Qing government but advocated writing traditional poetry. Its leader, Liu Yazi, continued to write in Classical Chinese until the early 1920s.

=== New Culture Movement ===
In the beginning of the twentieth century, the scene was set in China for both socio-political and poetic change, both political and literary revolution; indeed, the "twentieth century has drawn a heavy line across the time-chart of Chinese culture." The New Culture Movement also known as the May Fourth Movement, was a defining time period in the direction of poetic literature in Chinese language. Nominally originating in the socio-politically oriented student demonstrations in Beijing on May 4, 1919, the New Culture Movement May Fourth Movement was associated with a more general "intellectual ferment". The Beijing University (also known as the Peking University) had an important role in this process. Both Hu Shih and Cai Yuanpei are prime examples of those associated with the university around this time who urged a transformation in literary style deprecating the use of Classical Chinese, in favor of embracing written vernacular Chinese. Hu Shih, Xu Zhimo, Guo Moruo and some of poets followed this path towards a more modern literature, through the use of a more colloquial writing style. This, together with a western influence can be seen in other authors, such as Wen Yiduo.

=== International influence ===
The early twentieth century was also a period in which the world's other linguistic and cultural traditions of poetry greatly influenced Chinese poets, partly as a result of colonialism. For example, Lin Heng-tai grew up in Taichung, on the island of Taiwan, which was then under imperial Japanese control, with its resultant Japanese-oriented educational system; and, so, wrote all of his early poetry in Japanese. The presence of European colonies on the mainland and the islands of Hong Kong and Macau also provided sources of international influence. Attendance at university in Europe, Japan, or the United States provided another source of international influence on Chinese poets, or future Chinese poets, such as Xu Zhimo or Lu Xun (better known for his short stories and prose).

=== Societies and publications ===
The formation of various literary or poetic societies played an important role in the developing movement of modern Chinese poetry. Among these societies are the Creation Society (1921) headed by Guo Moruo, the Crescent Moon Society (1923), the League of Left-Wing Writers, and the Silver Bell Poetry Society.

A number of magazines or other publications also played an important role in the developing movement of modern Chinese poetry. One of the important early publications for modern Chinese poetry was New Youth (Xin Qingnian) 新青年, or La Jeunesse, which published from 1915 poetry written in vernacular Chinese by Hu Shih and Liu Bannong, as early as 1918. Another example is the Les Contemporains journal, published from 1932.

=== Continuing the classical tradition ===
Some authors of poetry in the first half of the twentieth century "continued to write pleasantly in the traditional metres and with more or less of the traditional manner". A major example is Mao Zedong (1893–1976), the first Chairman of the Chinese Communist Party and leader of the People's Republic of China for nearly 30 years, who continued the tradition of Chinese governmental officials writing Classical Chinese poetry. Many of Mao's popular poems can be seen to chronicle moments during his rise to power, from his early "Changsha" (1925) through "Reply to Mr. Liu Yazi" (1950).

== Later twentieth century ==
By the midpoint of the twentieth century, imperial Japan had been decisively defeated as part of the process of World War II, Kuomintang had retreated to bases in Taiwan and some other islands, where they began to establish regional control, and the Communist Party controlled most of mainland China. Many (with notable exceptions) of the poets of the first half of the twentieth century were already dead, imprisoned, in exile, or subject to strong political pressures to make their work conform to the expectations of their ruling governmental bodies. This was part of a trend which would continue throughout the next few years, through the White Terror (1949–1987) in Taiwan and the Cultural Revolution on the mainland (1966–1976). The Cold War (often dated 1947–1991) was one of the factors which contributed to the pressure on poets to produce patriotic poetry, and since then there has been some influence wrought by various political campaigns and plans.

=== Movements and societies ===
From the 1950s, in Taiwan has flourished modernist poetry, including avant-garde and surrealism, led by Qin Zihao (1902–1963) and Ji Xian (b. 1903). Most influential poetic journal and societies were the Modernist Poetry Quarterly (1952), the "Modernist School", the "Blue Star", and the "Epoch", all formed in 1954.

A large amount of poetry was published during the Cultural Revolution; it proliferated in non-traditional literary avenues like newspapers, performances, and Red Guard pamphlets.

In the contemporary poetic scene, the most important and influential poets are in the movement known as Misty Poets, who use oblique allusions and hermetic references. The most important Misty Poets include Shu Ting, Bei Dao, Gu Cheng, Duo Duo, and Yang Lian, most of whom were exiled after the Tiananmen Square protests of 1989. A special case is the mystic poet Hai Zi, who became very famous after his suicide.

Battler poetry, which originates from migrant labourers in post-1980s industrial China has also gained significance in the past two decades, both domestically and abroad. Prominent battler poets include Zheng Xiaoqiong, Xie Xiangnan, and Xu Lizhi, who use direct language and a combination of classical, socialist and industrial imagery to document their lives.

==== Amateur poetry societies ====
Amateur poetry societies have a long history on the mainland and on Taiwan. Towards the end of the twentieth century Ming and Qing style poetry contests were held in towns and cities around Taiwan, in which people sometimes wrote poems in contests. One type of these poems were known as "hitting the bowl" poems, because of the old-fashioned method of limiting the time to compose a poem by the time being regulated by burning an inch of incense stick to which a thread suspending a coin over a bowl was attached: when the incense stick burned up, the thread burned through, and the coin sounded an alarm when it hit the bowl below. Watches may have replaced incense sticks, but the "hitting the bowl" name remains.

== Early twenty-first century ==
Many of the traditional uses of Chinese poetry remain intact in the modern era. These include relationships between politics and poetry, and also completely traditional practices in folk culture such as posting New Year's couplets. Following Taiwanese poets like Yu Kwang-chung, Yang Mu, Xi Murong and Yang Chia-hsien, many new-generation poets have emerged.

In May 2022, the New Century New Generation Poetry Selection, edited by Taiwanese poets Xiang Yang, targets the millennials poets (born between 1980 and 1999, active from 2000 to 2022) who created modern poetry in Taiwan. It includes 52 poets such as Liao Chi-Yu, Yang Chih-Chieh, Hsu Pei-Fen, Zhuxue Deren, Tsao Yu-Po and Lin Yu-Hsuan.

In February 2024, Zhuxue Deren's poem "Moon Museum" was selected by the Arch Mission Foundation for the Arch Lunar Art Archive. The poem was carried to the Moon by the Odysseus lunar lander for permanent preservation, making it the earliest known Chinese poem to land on the Moon.

== Evaluation ==
Some critical views have involved evaluation of socio-political utility or loyalty of various poems or poets. Another critical theme involves aesthetic issues regarding the poetry deliberately written according to ideas about modernist/postmodernist/hypermodernist poetry versus poetry which continues the use of Classical Chinese poetry forms.

== See also ==
- Chen Duxiu
- Chinese poetry
- Crescent Moon Society
- Jade Ladder
- La Jeunesse
- Lower Body Poets
- Lu Zhiwei
- May Fourth Movement
- Misty poets
- Battler poetry
- New Culture Movement
- Poetic encyclopaedist school
- Poetry of Mao Zedong
- Sent-down youth
- Singaporean literature
- Tan Swie Hian
- Wai-lim Yip
- Written vernacular Chinese

== Bibliography ==
=== Sources ===
- Davis, A. R., ed. and introduc.(1970). The Penguin Book of Chinese Verse. Baltimore: Penguin Books.
- Davison, Gary Marvin; Reed, Barbara E. (1998). Culture and Customs of Taiwan. Westport, Conn: Greenwood Press. ISBN 0-313-30298-7
- Greene, Roland; et al., eds. (2012). "Modern poetry of China". The Princeton Encyclopedia of Poetry and Poetics (4th rev. ed.). Princeton, NJ: Princeton University Press. pp. 232–235. ISBN 978-0-691-15491-6.
- Klein, Lucas (2017). "Poems from Underground". In Wang, David Der-wei (ed.). A New Literary History of Modern China. Harvard, Ma: The Belknap Press of Harvard University Press. pp. 718–724. ISBN 978-0-674-97887-4.
- Lee, Leo Oufan. "Literary Trends: The Road to Revolution 1927–1949," Ch 9 in Fairbank, John King; Feuerwerker, Albert; Twitchett, Denis Crispin (1986). The Cambridge history of China. Cambridge, England: Cambridge University Press. ISBN 9780521243384.
- Lupke, Christopher (2017). "Modernism versus Nativism in 1960s Taiwan". In Wang, David Der-wei (ed.). A New Literary History of Modern China. Harvard, Ma: The Belknap Press of Harvard University Press. pp. 669–673. ISBN 978-0-674-97887-4.

=== Further reading ===
- Haft, Lloyd, ed. (1989). A Selective Guide to Chinese Literature, 1900–1949. Vol. 3: The Poem. Leiden: E. J. Brill. ISBN 90-04-08960-8.
