= Xie Xiangnan =

Chinese contemporary poet

- 謝湘南
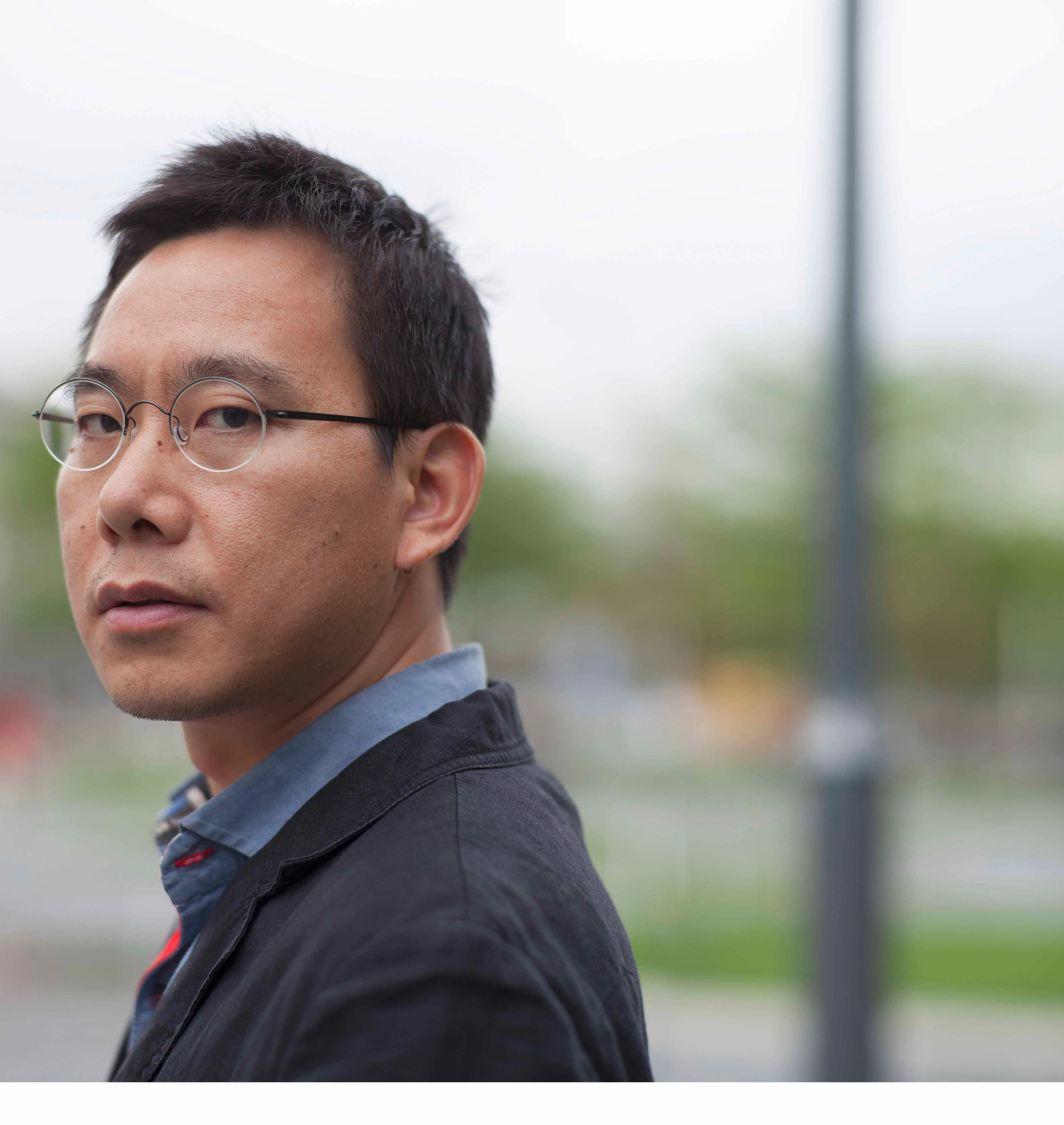
- Born: 1974 (age 51–52); Leiyang Village, Hunan, China
- Occupation: Poet

Xie Xiangnan (謝湘南) is a Chinese poet and member of the Post 70s Generation of Chinese avant-garde artists. He is often associated with the migrant-worker or battler poetry movement (dagong shige / 打工诗歌 in Mandarin), a working-class literary movement originating in post-socialist industrial China. Xie is the author of five poetry collections, including The History of Allergy and Poetic Life in Shenzhen. English translations of Xie's poetry may be found in the collection Iron Moon: An Anthology of Chinese Worker Poetry, edited by Qin Xiaoyu and translated by Eleanor Goodman.

== Life ==
Born in 1974 in rural Hunan, in the early 1990s Xie moved first to Zhejiang and then Shenzhen in search of work. He worked for much of his twenties in different manual labour jobs, including on the assembly lines at a toy factory and an electronics factory, at a paper mill and as a construction worker, moving between jobs in Shenzhen and nearer to his hometown.

Xie wrote poetry throughout this period, winning a 1995 poetry competition in Shaanxi, and after submitting work to the National Poetry Journal was invited to participate in the Youth Poetry Conference in 1997. In 2003, he got a job as a reporter and editor for the Southern Metropolis Daily, and has since drawn his primary income from writing work.

He lives and works in Shenzhen, and in 2021 was elected president of the Luhou District Writer's Association. In January 2025, he was awarded the 9th Lishan Poetry Prize.

== Poetry ==
Xie's poetry is known for its witty and ironic style, drawing on imagery of machinery, bodies and industrial environments.

Much of his early writing testifies to the gruelling and precarious nature of rural-urban migration in China, contrasting the utopian imagery of national dreams with explotative working conditions. He also makes use of the terse, technical language of factory reports to document the often dangerous conditions that he and fellow workers are exposed to, as in the poem "Work Accident Joint Investigative Report", which describes a young female worker losing her fingers to a faulty machine.

Xie's later writing makes more abstract use of language, and draws influence from the urban environment of Shenzhen. His 2018 collection Poetic Life in Shenzhen elaborates on his complex relationship to the city, describing himself as a "poet nurtured by the environment of Shenzhen", in spite of his traumatic early years there. He has objected to the categorisation of his poetry as 'migrant worker' poetry, preferring to be referred to simply as a poet.

== See also ==
- Zheng Xiaoqiong
- Xu Lizhi
