= Patrick D. Hanan Book Prize for Translation =

Translation award

The Patrick D. Hanan Book Prize for Translation (China and Inner Asia) is given biennially to an outstanding English translation of a significant work in any genre originally written in Chinese or an Inner Asian Language, from any time period.

== About the Prize ==
The prize was established in 2015, and is named for Patrick D. Hanan, who was renowned for his translations from Chinese into English. it is administered by the Association for Asian Studies.

== Winners ==
=== 2024 ===
- Winner: David Brophy, In Remembrance of the Saints: The Rise and Fall of an Inner Asian Sufi Dynasty, Columbia University Press
- Honorable Mention: Stan Lai, Selected Plays of Stan Lai (3 volumes), University of Michigan Press

=== 2020 ===
- Winner: Eleanor Goodman, The Roots of Wisdom by Zang Di, Zephyr Press.
- Honorable Mention: Michael Berry, Remains of Life by Wu He, Columbia UP.

=== 2018 ===
- Winner: Stephen Durrant, Wai-yee Li, David Schaberg, Zuo Tradition/Zuo Zhuan: Commentary on the “Spring and Autumn Annals”, University of Washington Press.
- Honorable Mention: Anthony Barbieri-Low, Robin D. S. Yates, Law, State and Society in Early Imperial China, Brill

=== 2016 ===
- Winner: Xiaofei Tian, The World of a Tiny Insect: A Memoir of the Taiping Rebellion and Its Aftermath by Zhang Daye, University of Washington Press
- Honorable Mention: Anne Behnke Kinney, Exemplary Women of Early China: The Lienü zhuan of Liu Xiang, Columbia University Press
