= Wang Xiaoni =

Chinese poet (born 1955)

Wang Xiaoni (Chinese: 王小妮; pinyin: Wáng Xiǎoní; born 1955) is a Chinese poet.

Xiaoni graduated from Jilin University in 1982 where she was a literary editor and worked for a film studio. In 1985, she settled in Shenzhen and became a professor at Hainan University. She has published over 25 books of poetry and won several awards. In 2015 the translation of her book Something Crosses My Mind by Eleanor Goodman was shortlisted for the International Griffin Poetry Prize. Other translations of her work have been published by poet Pascale Petit.

== Published works ==
- My Selected Poems (1986)
- On Visiting Friends (1992-1993)
- Exile in Shenzhen (1994)
- My Paper Wraps My Fire (1997)
- Something Crosses My Mind (2014)
