= Something Crosses My Mind =

Collection of poetry by Wang Xiaoni

- Simplified Chinese: 有什么在我心里一过
- Traditional Chinese: 有什麼在我心裡一過
Transcriptions
Standard Mandarin
- Hanyu Pinyin: Yǒu shénme zài wǒ xīnli yī guo

Something Crosses My Mind (Chinese: 有什么在我心里一过) is a collection of poetry by Wang Xiaoni, with Eleanor Goodman as the translator. It was published in 2014 by Chinese University of Hong Kong Press in Hong Kong, and Zephyr Press in the United States.

This was the first book with translations of Wang Xiaoni's work in English. The material originated in the period 1980-2011, with poems arranged by date. An introduction by Goodman is included.

Xu Bing made the cover, which depicts crops.

Reviewer Marthine Satris wrote that the work "showcases the attitudes of resistance and self-preservation [Wang Xiaoni] cultivated to survive in a changing China."

Amy Russell, in the South China Morning Post, gave the book four of five stars.
