= Lu Zhiwei =

Chinese linguist (1894–1970)

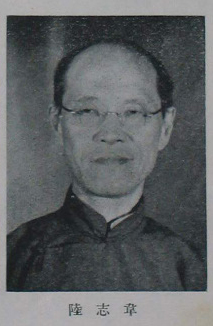

Lu Zhiwei (simplified Chinese: 陆志韦; traditional Chinese: 陸志韋; pinyin: Lù Zhìwéi; Wade–Giles: Lu Chih-wei; 6 February 1894 – 21 November 1970), also known as C. W. Luh, was an influential Chinese psychologist and linguist from Wuxing, Zhejiang. He was also an important figure in Chinese poetry, both for his critical ideas and as a poet being one of the early poets to work in the Modern Chinese poetry, influenced by a more vernacular style and by international developments in poetry.

== Career ==
In 1915, Lu went to study in the United States. In 1920, he graduated from the University of Chicago Department of Psychology with the doctoral paper "The Conditions of Retention". Lu returned to China that year and was hired by various academies in Nanjing. While he was teaching in the University of Nanjing, he became the first one to introduce the Pavlovian theories into China along with various other Western psychological ideas. In 1927, he arrived in Beijing and was hired as the professor of psychology at Yenching University. In 1933, he went to University of Chicago faculty of biology to pursue further education in psychology. He returned to China the next year and was appointed as the president of Yenching.

During the onset of the Second Sino-Japanese War, the study of psychology was halted. Lu began to turn his devotion of research into the Chinese linguistics, and published various papers beginning in 1939. His published book The Structure of Hanyu was one of the first complete analyses of the Chinese language structure. Lu was also one of the original developers of Pinyin.

In August 1941, he was arrested by the Japanese Army along with several other employees of Yenching University. After being discharged, he began to research on the Classical Chinese and completed the first draft of Introduction to Classical Pronunciation, in September, 1943.

After the Second Sino-Japanese War was over, Lu was in charge of rebuilding Yenching University. After the establishment of the People's Republic of China, Lu was transferred to the Chinese Academy of Sciences.

During the Cultural Revolution, he was criticized and persecuted like many other scholars at the time. On November 21, 1970, Lu died in Beijing due to illness.

== Works ==
- The Structure of Hanyu
- Introduction to Classical Pronunciation
- Record of Poetic Rhythms
- Social Psychology Textbook
- The Unlimited Wonders of Chinese Children

=== Poetry ===
- Crossing the River (1923)
- New Year and Other Poems (1933)
- Songs of the Monkey Year and Chicken Year (1933)

== References and further reading ==
- (in Chinese) Chinese Academy of Science
- (in Chinese) Chinese Linguistics Government Website
- West, Philip (1976). Yenching University and Sino-Western Relations, 1916-1952. Cambridge: Harvard University Press. ISBN 9780674965690.

== See also ==
- Mixed-sex education
- Modern Chinese poetry
- Nicolas Trigault
