= Crescent Moon Society =

Chinese literary society (1923–31)

The Crescent Moon Society (Chinese: 新月社; pinyin: Xīn Yuè Shè) was a Chinese literary society founded by the poet Xu Zhimo in 1923, which operated until 1931. It was named after The Crescent Moon, a poem by Rabindranath Tagore. The society began as a loosely-organized dining association. In addition to Xu Zhimo, its other members included leading author and educator Hu Shih, poets Wen Yiduo and Chen Mengjia, writers Liang Shih-chiu and Shen Congwen, Rao Mengkan, and sociologist Pan Guangdan.

The Crescent Moon Society—along with other aspects of China's literary establishment at that time—was part of the larger New Culture Movement.

It engaged in running debates with the "art for politics' sake" (and Chinese Communist Party-driven) League of the Left-Wing Writers.

The Society dissolved shortly after the death of Xu Zhimo in November 1931.

== See also ==
- Chinese literature
- Chinese poetry
- Modern Chinese poetry
