= Zheng Xiaoqiong =

Chinese poet

- Born: 1980 (age 45–46); Nanchong, Sichuan, China
- Occupation: Poet
- Awards: 2007 Liqun Literature Award

Zheng Xiaoqiong (郑小琼) is a Chinese poet and writer often associated with the migrant-worker or battler poetry movement (dagong shige / 打工诗歌). Her work is notable within the movement for its focus on women's experiences of industrial life, for references to classical Chinese literature, and for drawing links between local forms of exploitation and the effects of globalisation. She has been described as one of the most significant living Chinese poets, and as the 'face' of the migrant worker poetry movement.

== Life ==
Born in rural Sichuan, Zheng worked in a local hospital before moving to Dongguan City in 2001 in search of work. She worked first in a die mould factory, then a toy factory, a magnetic tape factory, and as a hole-punch operator in a hardware factory for five years.

In her essay Iron, Zheng describes starting to write poetry after her hand was injured by a lathe, encountering other migrant workers in hospital who had lost their fingers to machines, a common accident among factory workers in the region. In an acceptance speech for the 2007 Liqun award from the People's Literature Magazine, she mused "I often wonder, how far would those severed fingers reach if they were joined in a line?". In total, Zheng worked as a migrant labourer for eight years, before obtaining a position as a professional editor in 2009 at the Guangzhou literary journal Art Works,

== Poetry ==
Much of Zheng's poetry draws from her decade of experience as a factory worker. Her poems use a great deal of sensory detail, and often explore depersonalisation, and the blending of herself with industrial machinery. References to 'iron' appear throughout her writing as a symbol of hardness and dehumanisation, of the silence and malleability of migrant workers, but also of a strength borne from hardship. As she describes it: "I have always wanted my poetry to be filled with the taste of iron, solid, sharp."

Her poetic style is often praised for its rawness and directness, inheriting directly from her experience, as in critic Zhang Qinghua's 2010 essay Who Touches The Iron of the Age:

The pain in her work comes from her own mental and physical experiences, from participating directly in life... much of the power in Zheng's poetry arises from the interference between her life and body.

Her poetry and prose have appeared in a broad range of Chinese-language publications, including Shikan (a Beijing-based national monthly poetry journal), Shanhua, and People's Literature (Renmin Wenxue). Her poetry collections include Rose Manor, Huangma Mountains, Pedestrian Bridge, and Poems Falling on Machines. An English translation of her poetry, titled In the Roar of the Machine was published in 2022 by Giramondo, translated by Eleanor Goodman, and was shortlisted for the 2023 Lucien Stryk Asian Translation Prize. A second edition, published by the New York Review of Books, was published in 2025.

== Other writing ==
In addition to poetry, Zheng's work includes fiction, autobiographical essays and oral history. The latter includes Woman Worker, a project of interviews with female migrant workers conducted over the course of 10 years (2006–2015).

This was used by Zheng as the basis of her poetry collection, poetry collection based on the interviews titled Stories of Women Workers (女工记), which was published by the Guangzhou-based publisher Huacheng in 2012. This collection contains 100 poems, each one entitled with a worker's name, according to the idea that "each person's name signifies their dignity.". A selection of the interviews themselves were published in English in 2025 by the magazine Equator, translated by Eleanor Goodman.

== See also ==
- Sheng Keyi
- Xie Xiangnan
