= Jade Ladder =

2012 Chinese poetry anthology

Jade Ladder Contemporary Chinese Poetry
- Cover
- Editors: W. N. Herbert; Yang Lian; Qin Xiaoyu
- Translator: Brian Holton
- Language: English
- Subject: Chinese poetry
- Publisher: Bloodaxe Books
- Publication date: April 16, 2012
- Pages: 360
- ISBN: 1852248955

Jade Ladder: Contemporary Chinese Poetry is a 2012 anthology of contemporary Chinese poetry translated into English. The collection contains more than 200 poems from 53 poets. Nearly half are previously published English translations recommended by Chinese poet Yang Lian and the poet-critic Qin Xiaoyu (and chosen by chief editor W. N. Herbert), while the rest are new translations by Brian Holton. Native Cantonese and Chinese speaker Lee Man-Kay also contributed to the anthology.

== Summary ==
Herbert's preface is about the history of translation strategies, his own work with Chinese poets, and how Jade Ladder was assembled. He explains that the ladder in the title refers to a vision of the mythical Mount Kunlun as a ladder between earth and heaven that the holy could climb, and that the ladder is used here as a symbol for "the transit of the Chinese poem between the imagination and the world”.

According to Sean O'Brien, the editors of the anthology suggest that contemporary Chinese poetry translation should be treated as a form of cross-cultural dialogue, and should not be mere conversion of the recognizable elements of poems into English, because this does not enhance English readers' understanding of the "complex relationship of contemporary poets to the long but often contested traditions of Chinese poetry, to the public world, to the frequently censorious and punitive state, and to poetry beyond China."

The translations are divided into two parts and five sections: lyric poems (which take up the entirety of part one), narrative verse, neoclassical poems, sequences, and experimental and long poems. Each section is preceded by an introductory essay by Qin. The featured poets are mostly artists who came to prominence in the 1980s and 1990s.

== Reception ==
Andrew Radford of University of Glasgow lauded Jade Ladder, writing that there is more poetry about serious political issues than in a collection like Zhang Er and Chen Dongdong's Another Kind of Nation (2007) but that the collection is "capacious enough to contain much more than protest songs". Radford also argued that it is distinguished from earlier collections like The Red Azalea (1990), A Splintered Mirror (1991), Yeh's Anthology of Modern Chinese Poetry (1993), and Another Kind of Nation by its "culturally contextualizing essays from both Chinese and European standpoints [to help readers surmount] what are often intimidating linguistic and socio-cultural obstacles." The academic claimed, "Herbert is an urbane and knowledgeable guide while Yang Lian supplies what is aptly described as an 'insider's report' [...] with characteristically impish wit and stylistic brio."

John Taylor described the book as the "perfect place to study contemporary Chinese poetry [...] extensive and multifarious". Taylor praised the editors as discarding "facile" poems. One gets an overall impression of intricate, often tense, questioning and self-questioning via the act of poetry." The Guardian's Sean O'Brien dubbed it a "rich sample". He praised Herbert's preface as "informative and witty", and Holton's essay on being a translator as "engagingly irascible". in Magma, Mark Burnhope described Qin's introductory essay as "brief yet thorough". The reviewer mentioned the editors' implication that two literary qualities discussed in the introduction to the experimental works ("visual poetry" and unusual language) are lost in translation, but suggested that this weakens the English versions less than the editors imply. He dubbed the collection "a remarkable project which should be valuable to casual enjoyers of poetry, serious students of its historical and cultural contexts, and everyone in between."

Liansu Meng billed Jade Ladder as "the most comprehensive [contemporary Chinese poetry anthology] to date". Meng also said, "General readers as well as students and teachers of Chinese literature and culture will [...] enjoy the kaleidoscope of views they present." While noting some translation errors such as a Chinese term being translated with an older meaning of the term assumed instead of the more modern meaning, she stated that the editors overall "ensure musicality and readability without sacrificing accuracy". However, the reviewer complained that only three of the poets are women and that some well-regarded ones (like Lan Lan 蓝蓝, Zhou Zan 周瓒, Jiang Tao 江涛（布咏涛), Yin Lichuan 尹丽川, and Shu Ting) are absent.

Maghiel van Crevel had an unfavorable view of the anthology, agreeing that there were too few women featured, adding that there were too few poets who emerged in the 2000s and too few poets from what he calls the "earthly camp" (such as Han Dong), rather than the "elevated pole" (an aesthetic preference that he noted is also clear in other Chinese poetry anthologies like Another Kind of Nation, 2011's Push Open the Window, and 2013's New Cathay). He also argued that Herbert exaggerates the extent of oppression and official constraint against the Chinese poetry scene; that there is too little biographical information on featured poets; that there are opposing aims (among the makers of the anthology) of surveying the nation and simply presenting the poetry as art; and that Holton misrepresents Chinese views on what is needed for strong translations from Chinese.
