= Battler poetry =

Chinese literary movement

Battler Poetry
- Other names: Migrant Worker Poetry, Dagong Shige/ 打工诗歌
- Cultural origins: Post-1980s Industrial China
- Authors: Zheng Xiaoqiong, Xu Lizhi, Xie Xiangnan

Battler poetry, also referred to as migrant-worker poetry (dagong shige / 打工诗歌 in Mandarin), is a literary movement originating from migrant workers in post-1980s industrial China. Stylistically heterogeneous and often published through unofficial channels, battler poetry documents the experiences of China's approximately 280 million rural-urban internal migrant workers.

Comparisons have been drawn between battler poetry and the wider lineage of 'Chinese workers' literature', though contemporary migrant workers in Southern China's Special Economic Zones occupy a very different social status and relationship with the Chinese state to those writing in the New Culture Movement in the post-revolutionary 1920s. Many battler poets' work also references Chinese classical poetry. Writers Eleanor Goodman and Qin Xiaoyu (秦晓宇) characterise the movement as "a head-on collision of traditional Chinese culture with an explosion of capitalism".

== History ==
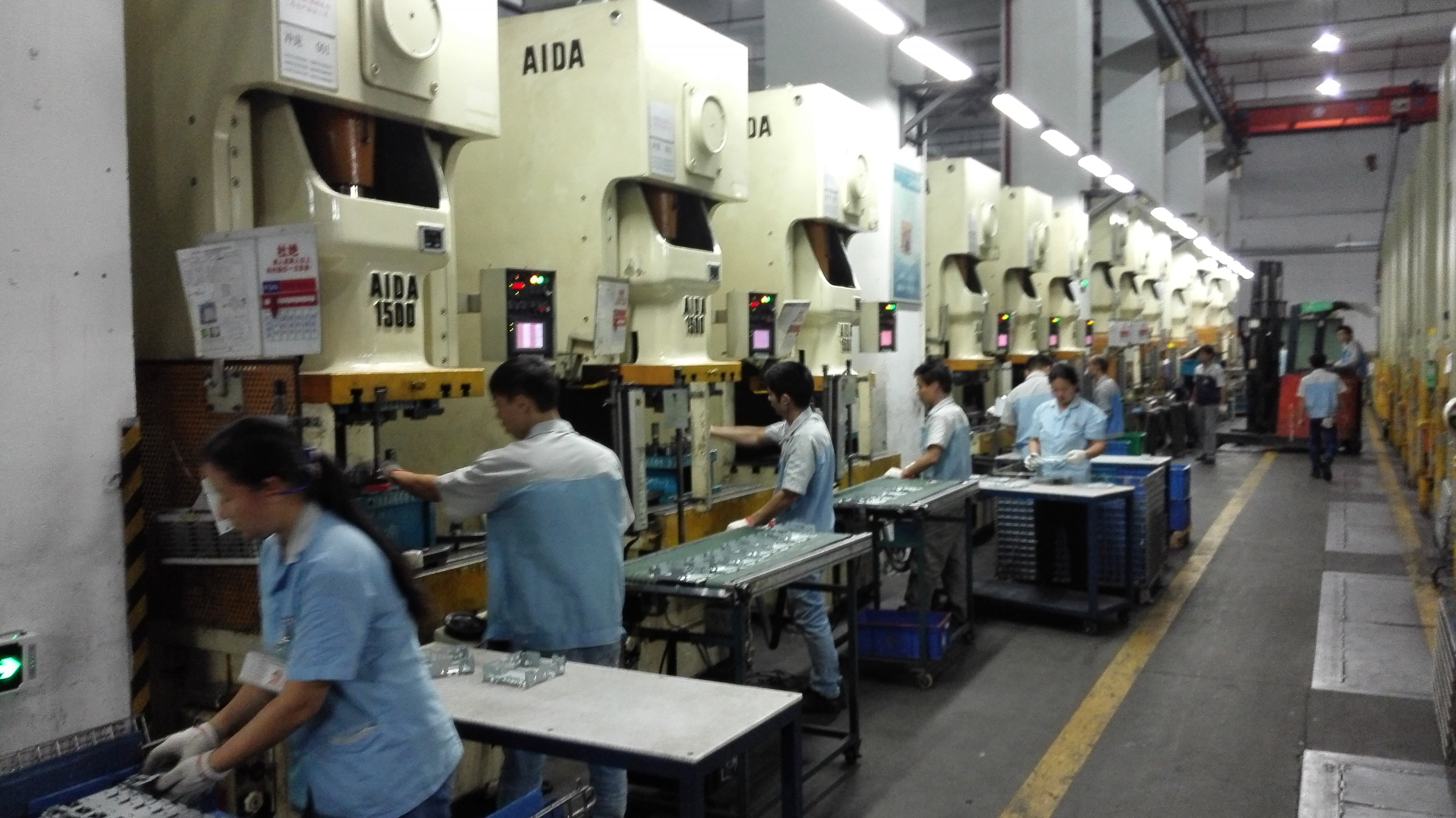
Workers producing pressed metal parts in a factory in Shenzhen, the industrial area of Southern China most associated with battler poetry

Battler poetry emerged in the 1980s, during a period of dramatic change in the Chinese economy. Deng Xiaoping's economic reforms and the subsequent creation of Special Economic Zones saw mass privatisation and industrial expansion, fuelled by a mostly rural labour force. These systems remain in place today, with an estimated 280 million internal migrant workers, mostly concentrated in the Pearl River Delta. These internal migrant workers are constrained by the Hukou demographic system, which prevents access to public services in urban areas not in their place of origin, making them vulnerable to exploitative working conditions.

"Battler" is a term borrowed from Australian English, an approximation of the Chinese Dagong (打工) 'working for the boss', a cultural status defined by precarious labour conditions. The term "dagong wenxue" 打工文学 (battler literature) was coined by Shenzhen-based cultural official and critic Yang Honghai (杨宏海) in 1985, in reference to an emergent phenomenon where migrant workers in industrial regions of Southern China had started publishing poetry in factory journals and local magazines.

In 1984, the first column dedicated to migrant writing appeared in the journal Special Zone Literature (特区文学), and in 1990 the awarding of the Dapeng Arts Prize to four migrant-worker poets was considered a major breakthrough for the scene. Toward the end of the 1990s, battler poetry began to feature more frequently in official literary journals, including People's Literature (Renmin Wenxue). The first major collecion of battler poetry, Battler World: The Surge of Youth and the Literature of the Battlers (青春 的涌动), edited by Yang Honghai, was published in 2000. A second major anthology, Selections of Chinese Migrant Worker Poetry, 1985–2005 (中國打 工詩歌精選), edited by Xu Qiang, Luo Deyuan and Chen Zhongcun, and published by the Pearl River Press was published in 2007, and runs to almost 400 pages in length.

== Death of Xu Lizhi ==
While battler poetry has had cultural significance in China for decades, the death by suicide of poet and Foxconn worker Xu Lizhi in 2014 drew more attention to the movement, both within China and internationally. An obituary for Xu was published a week after his death in the Shenzhen Evening News, and a collection of English translations of his poetry was published in the following weeks by a collective known as the Nao project. English-language outlets, including The Washington Post Bloomberg, Time Magazine later published these translations (Bloomberg without credit to the translators), alongside accounts of Xu's life and death.

In 2015, the editor Qin Xiaoyu edited an individual collection of over 200 of Xu's poems, titled A New Day (新的一天), and published by the Beijing-based Writers Press. The English title of Qin's multi-author 2015 collection Iron Moon: an Anthology of Chinese Worker Poetry borrows its title from one of Xu's poems (many of which are included in the collection), and also features Xu's face on the cover. The name is also shared with the documentary, Iron Moon produced by Qin and Wu Feiyue (吳飛越), consisting of interviews with battler poets and Xu Lizhi's family.

== Themes ==
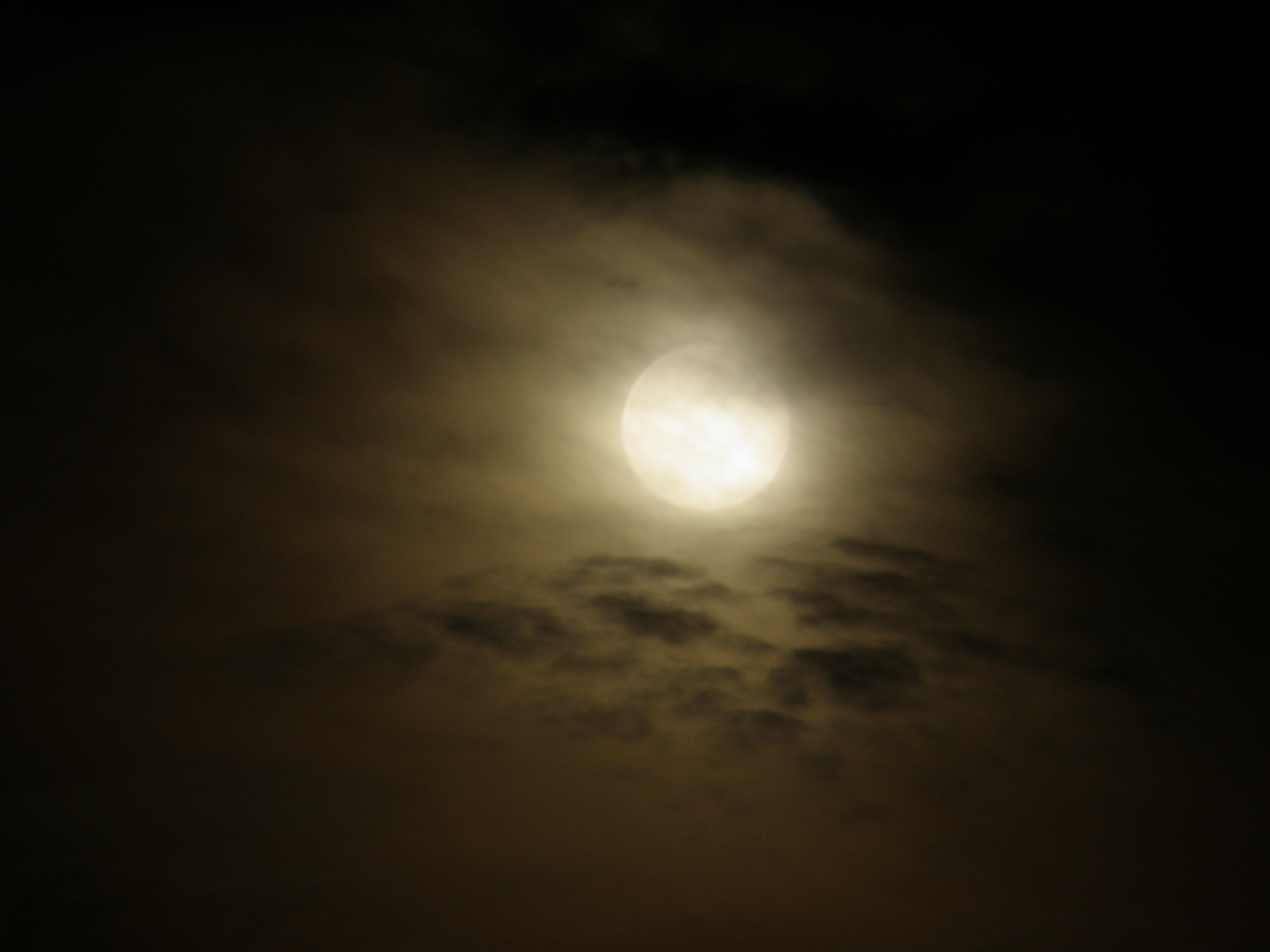
Imagery of the moon is common in traditional Chinese poetry, and is often referenced in migrant worker poetry to invoke a contrast with poets' working conditions

Though battler poetry can be stylistically heterogeneous, it is typically characterised as both originating from and chronicling lives of migrant workers. It serves as both a form of aesthetic expression and social practice, as an assertion of the dignity of workers otherwise excluded from forms of cultural production. Sinologist Maghiel van Crevel has observed that commentary on battler poetry "is often framed in a crude opposition of social significance (high) and aesthetic value (low) that might just not be the whole story".

=== Allusion to Chinese history ===
Often, both socialist and classical Chinese literary references are employed by battler poets in an ironic way, to contrast traditional ideals with the harshness of their experience as workers. For example, in Xie Xiangnan's poem Guangzhou Train Station, March 1996, for example, the language of revolution is used to point to a "new historical moment".

...
there was a huge crowd at the Guangzhou train station in March 1996 too
the bags piled on the square were like packages of explosives
and I almost imagined the digital clock towering overhead
was our beloved Lenin...

— Xie Xiangnan (trans. Eleanor Goodman)

Themes and imagery common to classical Chinese poetry are often employed. For example, imagery of the moon appears frequently: from Hubei Qingwa's Moon's Position in the Factory, or Zheng Xiaoqiong's Moonlight: Married Workers Living Apart. Xu Lizhi's I Swallowed an Iron Moon (from which a major collection is named) is often used as an example of this collision between these worlds, in which the traditional moon is contrasted with the hardness and modernity of iron.

=== Globalisation ===
Prominent battler poets, including Zheng Xiaoqiong and Xu Lizhi, became notable in part because of their blogs, and social media platforms such as WeChat and Weibo provide important points of dissemination for contemporary battlers poetry. This 'global reach' is, however, one that also forms a core aspect of these workers' exploitation, in their role in the global production line.

This irony is present in Wu Xia's poem Sundress, in which she imagines a girl in another country wearing the dress she is currently ironing, ending with the line "unknown girl, I love you".

== Naming ==
Who is labelled a 'battler poet', by whom, and what that label suggests is a fraught issue. Media studies researcher Sun Wanning discusses this in her 2014 book Subaltern China: Rural Migrants, Media and Cultural Practices: "although worker-poets are the authors of many powerful lines, and are now widely referred to as dagong poets, they did not get to choose their own label".

Battler poet Zheng Xiaoqiong has also highlighted this tension, declaring that "very few migrant workers have been accepted by the mainstream establishment. Most of them still stay at the bottom of the society." Some poets regarded as battler poets, such as Xie Xiangnan, object directly to the blanket categorisation of their work in terms of their worker status, wishing to be considered instead on the basis of their poetics.

== Institutional recognition ==
Poetry by battler poets has appeared in a wide variety of publications, including official journals such as People's Literature (Renmin Wenxue) and winning a number of major national prizes.

There are also organisations dedicated solely to publishing migrant workers' poetry. The Picun Literature Group was established in 2014, as an initiative at The Migrant Workers Home (工友之家), is one of the foremost NGOs working on labour rights issues in the country. Their journal, Picun Literature is dedicated to publishing battler literature. Labour NGOs such as Migrant Women's Home (打工妹之家) (Beijing) and the Chinese Working Women Network (女工关怀) (Shenzhen) also play a role of promoting the cultural contributions of women workers.

Migrant workers' poetry has a complex relationship to the state, experiencing both support and censorship at different points. Despite her poetry's success, for example, Zheng Xiaoqiong's The Woman Worker, a collection of oral histories of female migrant workers remain unpublished domestically, though her poetry collection based on the interviews titled Stories of Women Workers (女工记), was published by the Guangzhou-based publisher Huacheng in 2012.

== See also ==
- Misty Poets
- Samizdat
