= Text segmentation =

Human writing practice

Text segmentation is the process of dividing written text into meaningful units, such as words, sentences, or topics. The term applies both to mental processes used by humans when reading text, and to artificial processes implemented in computers, which are the subject of natural language processing. The problem is non-trivial, because while some written languages have explicit word boundary markers, such as the word spaces of written English and the distinctive initial, medial and final letter shapes of Arabic, such signals are sometimes ambiguous and not present in all written languages.

Compare speech segmentation, the process of dividing speech into linguistically meaningful portions.

== Segmentation problems ==
=== Word segmentation ===
Word segmentation is the problem of dividing a string of written language into its component words.

In English and many other languages using some form of the Latin alphabet, the space is a good approximation of a word divider (word delimiter), although this concept has limits because of the variability with which languages emically regard collocations and compounds. Many English compound nouns are variably written (for example, ice box = ice-box = icebox; pig sty = pig-sty = pigsty) with a corresponding variation in whether speakers think of them as noun phrases or single nouns; there are trends in how norms are set, such as that open compounds often tend eventually to solidify by widespread convention, but variation remains systemic. In contrast, German compound nouns show less orthographic variation, with solidification being a stronger norm.

However, the equivalent to the word space character is not found in all written scripts, and without it word segmentation is a difficult problem. Languages which do not have a trivial word segmentation process include Chinese, Japanese, where sentences but not words are delimited, Thai and Lao, where phrases and sentences but not words are delimited, and Vietnamese, where syllables but not words are delimited.

In some writing systems however, such as the Ge'ez script used for Amharic and Tigrinya among other languages, words are explicitly delimited (at least historically) with a non-whitespace character.

The Unicode Consortium has published a Standard Annex on Text Segmentation, exploring the issues of segmentation in multiscript texts.

Word splitting is the process of parsing concatenated text (i.e. text that contains no spaces or other word separators) to infer where word breaks exist.

Word splitting may also refer to the process of hyphenation.

Some scholars have suggested that modern Chinese should be written in word segmentation, with spaces between words like written English. Because there are ambiguous texts where only the author knows the intended meaning. For example, "美国会不同意。" may mean "美国 会 不同意。" (The US will not agree.) or "美 国会 不同意。" (The US Congress does not agree). For more details, see Chinese word-segmented writing.

=== Intent segmentation ===
Intent segmentation is the problem of dividing written words into keyphrases (2 or more group of words).

In English and all other languages the core intent or desire is identified and become the corner-stone of the keyphrase Intent segmentation. Core product/service, idea, action & or thought anchor the keyphrase.

"[All things are made of atoms]. [Little particles that move] [around in perpetual motion], [attracting each other] [when they are a little distance apart], [but repelling] [upon being squeezed] [into one another]."

=== Sentence segmentation ===
Sentence segmentation is the problem of dividing a string of written language into its component sentences. In English and some other languages, using punctuation, particularly the full stop/period character is a reasonable approximation. However even in English this problem is not trivial due to the use of the full stop character for abbreviations, which may or may not also terminate a sentence. For example, Mr. is not its own sentence in "Mr. Smith went to the shops in Jones Street." When processing plain text, tables of abbreviations that contain periods can help prevent incorrect assignment of sentence boundaries.

As with word segmentation, not all written languages contain punctuation characters that are useful for approximating sentence boundaries.

=== Topic segmentation ===
Topic analysis consists of two main tasks: topic identification and text segmentation. While the first is a simple classification of a specific text, the latter case implies that a document may contain multiple topics, and the task of computerized text segmentation may be to discover these topics automatically and segment the text accordingly. The topic boundaries may be apparent from section titles and paragraphs. In other cases, one needs to use techniques similar to those used in document classification.

Segmenting the text into topics or discourse turns might be useful in some natural processing tasks: it can improve information retrieval or speech recognition significantly (by indexing/recognizing documents more precisely or by giving the specific part of a document corresponding to the query as a result). It is also needed in topic detection and tracking systems and text summarizing problems.

Many different approaches have been tried: e.g. HMM, lexical chains, passage similarity using word co-occurrence, clustering, topic modeling, etc.

It is quite an ambiguous task – people evaluating the text segmentation systems often differ in topic boundaries. Hence, text segment evaluation is also a challenging problem.

=== Other segmentation problems ===
Processes may be required to segment text into segments besides mentioned, including morphemes (a task usually called morphological analysis) or paragraphs.

== Automatic segmentation approaches ==
Automatic segmentation is the problem in natural language processing of implementing a computer process to segment text.

When punctuation and similar clues are not consistently available, the segmentation task often requires fairly non-trivial techniques, such as statistical decision-making, large dictionaries, as well as consideration of syntactic and semantic constraints. Effective natural language processing systems and text segmentation tools usually operate on text in specific domains and sources. As an example, processing text used in medical records is a very different problem than processing news articles or real estate advertisements.

The process of developing text segmentation tools starts with collecting a large corpus of text in an application domain. There are two general approaches:

- Manual analysis of text and writing custom software
- Annotate the sample corpus with boundary information and use machine learning

Some text segmentation systems take advantage of any markup like HTML and know document formats like PDF to provide additional evidence for sentence and paragraph boundaries.

== See also ==
- Hyphenation
- Natural language processing
- Speech segmentation
- Lexical analysis
- Word count
- Line breaking
- Image segmentation
