= Xu Lizhi =

Xu Lizhi (Wade–Giles: Hsü Li-chih) may refer to:

- Leetsch C. Hsu or Xu Lizhi (徐利治; 1920–2019), Chinese mathematician
- Lap-Chee Tsui or Xu Lizhi (徐立之; born 1950), Chinese-Canadian geneticist
- Xu Lizhi (poet) (许立志; 1990–2014), Chinese poet
