= Brian Holton (translator) =

Scottish translator of Chinese poetry (born 1949)

Brian Holton (born 11 July 1949) is the translator of Chinese "Misty" poet Yang Lian. He translates into English and Scots, and is the only currently publishing Chinese-Scots translator in the world.

== Biography ==
=== Early life ===
Holton was born in Galashiels, Selkirkshire, Scotland, but spent his early years from 1949 to 1955 in Lagos, Nigeria.

=== Education ===
Holton was educated in Scotland, at Larbert High School and Galashiels Academy, studying for Highers in Latin, Greek, French and English. He gained an MA 1st class Hons. (summa cum laude) in Chinese studies from the University of Edinburgh in 1975, after which he carried out postgraduate research at Durham University from 1976 to 1978.

=== Career ===
From 1978 to 1985 Holton was based in the Scottish Borders, working in jobs including at the Ettrick & Lauderdale Museum Service from 1982 to 1985 as a documentation supervisor: cataloguing, indexing, copy editing, print buying, conceiving and mounting exhibitions, and carrying out general curatorial work.

From 1981 to 1985 he worked for BBC Radio Tweed, BBC Radio Scotland as a part-time writer and presenter part-time working on features, music, literature, and cultural events.

From 1981 to 1982 he worked at the Border Country Life Museum as an assistant curator handling field collection and collection management.

From 1980 to 1981 Holton worked for the Borders Regional Council, surveying and photographing buildings of architectural or historic importance, and in 1979–1980 writing guidebooks and other tourist literature.

==== Academic career ====
He was the Leverhulme Research Associate in the Dept. of Chinese at the University of Edinburgh, working on the Jin Shengtan Project from 1985 to 1988.

He also worked at Ningbo University, Ningbo, PRC in 1989 as a lecturer in English.

He worked for Amnesty International's East Asia Research Dept. in London in 1989 as a researcher and translator and from 1991 to 1992 as a freelance translator.

He was a lecturer in Chinese at the University of Edinburgh, Dept. of East Asian Studies from 1989 to 1991, teaching modern and classical Chinese literature and language.

He worked for the London School of Traditional Chinese Medicine from 1991 to 1992 as a tutor and interpreter.

He taught at the Civil Service College, Sunningdale, Berkshire from 1991 to 1992 as a consultant tutor providing management training.

He taught at the University of Durham's Dept. of East Asian Studies from 1992 to 1997 as a lecturer in Chinese, teaching modern and classical Chinese literature and language.

He was at the Language Centre of the University of Newcastle-upon-Tyne from 1997 to 1999 as a lecturer in Chinese teaching Chinese language and Chinese-English translation. At the same university he was from 1993 to 1997 a lector in Chinese, teaching Chinese language.

From 2000 to 2009 Holton worked at the Hong Kong Polytechnic University, Department of Chinese & Bilingual Studies, teaching Chinese-English translation and cultural studies, as an assistant professor.

=== Marriage ===
Holton is married to Guo Ying (郭莹), an author of popular Chinese travel books.

== Published works ==
With Herbert, W.N. and Yang, Lian eds (forthcoming 2010/11) Anthology of Contemporary Chinese Poetry (working title) Tarset: Bloodaxe Books.

With Agnes Hung-Chong Chan: Yang Lian (2009) Lee Valley Poems. Tarset: Bloodaxe Books

Yang Lian (2008) Pisces Rising. Exeter: Shearsman.

With Jacob Edmond and Hilary Chung (2006): Yang Lian: Unreal City. A Chinese Poet in Auckland. Auckland: Auckland University Press.

With Harvey Holton: Yang Lian (2005) Whaur the Deep Sea Devauls. Edinburgh, Kettillonia*

With Agnes Hung-Chong Chan: Yang Lian (2005). Concentric Circles. Tarset: Bloodaxe Books

Yang Lian (2002) Notes of a Blissful Ghost: Selected Poems by Yang Lian. HK: Renditions Paperback

Yang Lian (2002) Darknesses: trilingual (Chinese-Italian-English) edition. Rome: Play On Poetry

Yang Lian (1999) Where the Sea Stands Still: New Poems by Yang Lian. Newcastle: Bloodaxe Books. UK Poetry book Society Recommended Translation.

Excerpts used by composer Liza Lim as the libretto of a piece for soprano and guqin commissioned by Festival d'Automne à Paris, 2005.

Yang Lian, (1995) China Daily: trilingual (Chinese-German-English) edition. Berlin: Schwartzkopf & Schwartzkopf

Yang Lian (1995) Where the Sea Stands Still. London: WellSweep Press.

Yang Lian (1994) Non-Person Singular: Collected Shorter Poems of Yang Lian. London: WellSweep Press.

=== In Scots ===
"Staunin Ma Lane: Chinese Verse in Scots and English". Shearsman Books (2016) ISBN 9781848614666

"The Nine Sangs" in Lallans 67. Blackford, Perthshire, Hairst 2005

With Harvey Holton: Yang Lian (2005) Whaur the Deep Sea Devauls. Edinburgh, Kettillonia.

"Frae the Nine Sangs: A wee Pendicle ti ‘Suddron Sangs’ bi Dauvit Hawkes" in May, R. & Minford, J. ed. (2003) A Birthday Book for Brother Stone HK: CUHK Press.

Mossflow (article about and extract from my Scots version of Shuihu Zhuan – Water Margin) at http://vladivostok.com/Speaking_In_Tongues/mossflow.html (May 1998)

"On Luve" by Qiao Jifu: Edinburgh Review No, 99, Edinburgh (March 1998)

"Sangs": versions of Shi Jing poems, in Finlay, A., ed., Carmichael's Book, a homage to Alexander Carmichael's 'Carmina Gaedelica’, Artbook and Morning Star: Inverness and Edinburgh (1997)

Yang Lian "Whaur the Deep Sea Devauls" Gairfish, Newcastle (1997)

Poems by Li Bo, Tao Qian, etc.: in Stokes, T. (ed.) Water on the Border. Yarrow: Weproductions (1994)

Poems by Qiao Jifu and Ma Zhiyuan: Chapman 73, Edinburgh (1993)

"Men o the Mossflow" (Shuihu Zhuan) cap. 5: Edinburgh Review 89, Edinburgh (1993)

"Men o the Mossflow" cap. 4: Edinburgh Review 76 (1987)

"Men o the Mossflow" cap. 3: Edinburgh Review 74 (1986)

"Men o the Mossflow" cap. 2: Cencrastus 16, Edinburgh (1984)

Lu Xun "Yin Wee Thing" (Yijian Xiao Shi) Cencrastus No. 13 (1983), ISSN 0264-0856

Shen Jiji "The Cod" (Zhen-zhong Ji) Lallans 18, Edinburgh (1982)

"Men o the Mossflow" cap. 1 pt. 2: Cencrastus No. 8, Spring 1982, pp. 32 - 35, ISSN 0264-0856

"Men o the Mossflow" cap. 1 pt. 1: Cencrastus No. 7, Winter 1981-82, pp. 2 - 5, ISSN 0264-0856

=== CD-Rom ===
Chiho, Hoshino, City of Dead Poets. Poems by Yang Lian, CD-ROM, Karlsruhe: Cyperfection (2000) BH translations of Yang Lian incorporated into cyber artwork.

=== Audiotape/CD ===
Mossflow Glasgow: Scotsoun. Audiotape/CD of BH reading from Men o the Mossflow. (2002; CD 2005) see https://web.archive.org/web/20091208161124/http://www.lallans.co.uk/sscd%20135%20-%20The%20Mossflow%20-%20Brian%20Holton.html

=== Corpus texts ===
Nine Sangs and Mossflow selected for the Scottish Corpus of Texts & Speech, University of Glasgow. See http://www.scottishcorpus.ac.uk/corpus/search/document.php?documentid=1628

=== Articles ===
Review article: Twentieth-Century Chinese Women's Poetry: An Anthology. Edited and translated by Julia C. Lin. In Renditions Autumn 2010.

Review article: Leo Tak-hung Chan (ed.) One into Many in The Translator: Volume 15, Number 2, 2009: Special Issue. Chinese Discourses on Translation. p431-435 "老外侃中國": 鏡報月刊 August 2007 p92-93 ["A Foreigner Chats about China" Mirror Monthly]

"Driving to the Harbour of Heaven: Translating Yang Lian’s Concentric Circles" in Li Dingjun, ed. 《诗人译诗 译诗为诗：中西诗歌翻译百年论集》Shanghai, (2007) Also at http://cipherjournal.com/html/holton.html [Poets Translating Poetry – Translated Poems as Poems: A Century of Collected Writings on Chinese-Western-Language Poetry Translation]

"Anent The Nine Sangs" in Lallans 67. Blackford, Perthshire, Hairst 2005 (in Scots)

"Driving to the Harbour of Heaven: Translating Yang Lian’s Concentric Circles" in BH, with Agnes Hung-Chong Chan:

Yang Lian Concentric Circles Tarset: Bloodaxe Books, (2005)

"Wale A Leid An Wale A Warld: Shuihu Zhuan into Scots", in Findlay, W., ed., Frae Ither Tongues: Essays on Translations Into Scots, Cleveden, Buffalo, Toronto, Sydney: Multilingual Matters (2004).

Travelling With A Bitter Melon: Selected Poems (1973-1998) by Leung Ping-kwan Review article, at http://www.persimmon-mag.com/spring2003/bookreview11.html

A Laowai on Laowai ("老外侃老外") in Guo, Ying 郭莹 Laowai Kan Zhongguo 老外侃中国, Beijing: Beijing Writers’ Press (2003). Trans. Zhang Xu

"A Chuckie Stane for Hawkes" in May, R. & Minford, J. ed. (2003) A Birthday Book for Brother Stone Hong Kong: Chinese University Press

"Translating Transgression" in Yang Lian tr. Holton, Brian Notes of a Blissful Ghost: Selected Poems by Yang Lian (HK: Renditions Paperback; 2002).

"A Better Planet" ("未来美好的星球") in Guo, Ying 郭莹 Xiangshi Xifeng 相识西风, Guangzhou: Guangzhou People's Press (2001). Trans. Zhu Zhiyu.

"Translating Yang Lian" in Where the Sea Stands Still: New Poems by Yang Lian Newcastle: Bloodaxe Books (1999) (extract from the above: Literary Review of Canada Oct. 2001, p5-6)

"Translator’s Afterword" in Non-Person Singular: Collected Shorter Poems of Yang Lian. London: WellSweep Press (1994)

"A Solemn Joyousness: Death and Dying in the Tibetan Tradition": in Kaim-Caudle, P., Keithley. J., & Mullender, A. (eds.) Aspects of Ageing. London: Whiting & Birch (1993).

Original Instruments, a review of The Exquisite Instrument by Ron Butlin, in Hearn, Sheila G. (ed.), Cencrastus No. 11, New Year 1983, p. 43, ISSN 0264-0856

(17 short works on Scottish Borders history and topography, 1979–86)

=== Others ===
==== Fiction (in Scots) ====
"O Niver ti Dree Corruption Mair" in Lallans 71, Blackford, Perthshire, 2008 poetry

"Chemistry" at https://web.archive.org/web/20110712230923/http://www.humangenreproject.com/page.php?id=69 uploaded August 2009

==== Music ====
Traditional music of Scotland, Ireland and Northumberland, played on the (whistle, Scottish smallpipes, lap dulcimer, guitar, mandolin, and vocals)

2002-04 Hong Kong Ceilidh Band/New Atlantic Bridge

1985-88 Kelts Wells

1975-77 Blackcock Spinney

1973–present Solo performances of Scottish traditional music and song.
