= Eleanor Goodman =

American poet, writer, and translator

- Born: 1979 (age 46–47)
- Other name: 顾爱玲
- Education: Amherst College, B.A.; Boston University, M.A.
- Occupations: Poet, writer, translator
- Years active: 2014–present

Eleanor Goodman
- Simplified Chinese: 顾爱玲
- Traditional Chinese: 顧愛玲
Transcriptions
Standard Mandarin
- Hanyu Pinyin: Gù Àilíng

Eleanor Goodman (born 1979; Chinese: 顾爱玲; pinyin: Gù Àilíng) is an American poet, writer, and translator of Chinese. Her 2014 translation of the poems of Wang Xiaoni, Something Crosses My Mind was an international finalist for the Griffin Poetry Prize and a winner of the Lucien Stryk American Literary Translators Association Prize for excellence in translation.

== Biography and works ==
Goodman is a 2001 graduate of Amherst College, with degrees in English and music, and a masters degree in poetry from Boston University.

She first gained notice for her translation of Wang Xiaoni with its shortlisting for the Griffin prize, noted as the largest monetary award for poetry in the world; for translations the award's "focus is on the achievement of the translator." Reviews of the work cited its "brilliant translation" and said that Goodman was "a wonderful poet." Reviews appeared in the journal Cha and mainstream Chinese newspapers, South China Morning Post (also calling it a "brilliant translation") and Caixin Online. Feature articles on her work have appeared in Chinese in China News, The Paper, Paper Republic and LifeWeek. The work was previously awarded a PEN/Heim Translation Fund Grant, and went on to win the Lucien Stryk Asian Translation Prize in 2015.

Goodman's first book of original poetry, Nine Dragon Island (Zephyr, 2016) was a finalist for the 2014 Drunken Boat poetry award. The book was glowingly reviewed, with one reviewer saying it "offers some of the most evocative and sensitive poems about dying and grief that I’ve read in a very long time." Short stories by Goodman have appeared in Fiction and other journals. She has been interviewed in the L.A. Review of Books, Poetry International, and The Shanghai Literary Review.

Goodman's seminal translation of the anthology Iron Moon: Chinese Worker's Poetry (White Pine Press, 2017) was named a "Book of the Year" in the Times Literary Supplement and one of "The Paris Review Staff's Favorite Books of 2020." The book is the first anthology of Chinese migrant worker poetry to be translated into English, and continues to be an important resource, receiving references and reviews in prominent journals and newspapers such as The Economist, the Asia-Pacific Journal, and The New York Times.

Significant translations by Goodman include The Roots of Wisdom Series: Selected Poems of Zang Di (Zephyr Press, 2017), which was awarded the prestigious Patrick D. Hanan Book Prize for Translation from the Association for Asian Studies, Days When I Hide My Corpse in a Cardboard Box: Poems by Lok Fung (Zephyr Press, 2018), which was shortlisted for the 2019 Lucien Stryk Asian Translation Prize, and Zheng Xiaoqiong's In the Roar of the Machine which was shortlisted for the 2023 Lucien Stryk Prize..

In 2013, Goodman was awarded a Fulbright Fellowship for research in China. She has also had residencies and visiting artist appointments at the Vermont Studio Center and the American Academy in Rome. She is a research associate at Harvard's Fairbank Center for Chinese Studies. Goodman has written for many venues, including The Paris Review, Best American Poetry, the Los Angeles Review of Books, SupChina, and ChinaFile.

Goodman was the recipient of a 2022 National Endowment for the Arts Translation Fellowship for her translation of Zang Di's Elegies for My Son.
