= Peter Kaim-Caudle =

Peter Kaim-Caudle (1916 in Breslau – 18 May 2010 in Paris) was Emeritus Professor of Social Policy at Durham University and a recognised expert on the provision of social services.

== Life and career ==
Peter Robert Kaim was born in Breslau to a middle-class German Jewish family on 14 December 1916. In 1933 he left the increasingly anti-semitic German Reich for England, where he studied economics at the LSE. He graduated in 1939 and went to work in business.

At the outbreak of World War II he was interned for fifteen months as an enemy alien in the Isle of Man and later in Canada where his career in education began with organising classes for fellow internees. At the war's end he returned to Britain and married Patricia Caudle, a Londoner and former landgirl and later English teacher. Adopting the new blended surname of Kaim-Caudle, they had four children.

Peter's post-war career began as a lecturer at the University of Dundee. This was followed in 1950 by a move to the University of Durham where he spent the rest of his professional life and made the city his home. As the University's first Professor of Social Administration he authored many papers for British and overseas journals on social service provision, particularly on pensions and the provision and management of government-subsidised health care. From 1963 he collaborated with and made frequent visits to the Economic and Social Research Institute in Dublin. His contributions to Irish social policy research were recognised by the award in 2002 of the honorary degree of D.Litt. from the National University of Ireland, Maynooth.

Peter died at his daughter's home in Le Vésinet, Paris on 18 May 2010.

== Published books ==
- Kaim-Caudle, Peter (1967). Social Policy in the Irish Republic. Routledge & Kegan Paul.
- Kaim-Caudle, Peter (1970). Ophthalmic Services in Ireland. The Economic and Social Research Institute.
- Kaim-Caudle, Peter (1973). Comparative social policy and social security;: A ten-country study. Dunellen.
- Kaim-Caudle, Peter; Marsh, Geoffrey (1976). Team Care in General Practice. Croom Helm.
- Kaim-Caudle, Peter; Keithley, Jane; Mullender, Audrey (1993). Aspects of Ageing: A Celebration of the European Year of Older People and Solidarity Between Generations, 1993. Whiting & Birch.
