= Xu Lizhi (poet) =

Chinese poet and factory worker

- Born: July 18, 1990; Jieyang, Guangdong, China
- Died: September 30, 2014 (aged 24); Shenzhen, Guangdong, China
- Occupations: Poet, factory worker

Xu Lizhi (Chinese: 许立志, 1990 – 1 October 2014) was a Chinese poet and factory worker. Xu worked for Foxconn and attracted media attention after his suicide, after which his friends published his collection of poems.

His poetry is featured in Chuang 1 ("Dead Generations"), a collection of essays published by AK Press and authored by Chinese Communists who have become disillusioned in or disappointed with the results produced by the Chinese Communist Party.

== Life ==
=== Early life ===
Xu Lizhi was born in a farmer's family on 18 July 1990 in Jieyang. He was the youngest of the three sons. Xu's mother was a Christian who used to relate biblical stories to Xu. Xu Lizhi showed great interest in reading books in his childhood, especially literature, though he did not have a lot of access to books.

While Xu was in high school, he wanted to enter a university, but his scores on the national entrance exam were not good enough to allow it. This failure saddened Xu tremendously. According to Xu's father, Xu "became introverted" since then. Xu's father tried to convince Xu to make a living by learning to repair computers, while Xu Lizhi's brother, Xu Hongzhi, encouraged Xu Lizhi to use another way to change his life – to find opportunities in cities.

=== Shenzhen ===
In July 2010 Xu went to Shenzhen, a place that was experiencing rapid industrialization. In 21 October 2010, Xu had appendix surgery and posted his first recorded poem on his blog. He signed a three-year employment contract with Foxconn in 2011. Xu's working conditions were poor and caused loss of sleep, coughing and headaches. Soon after Xu started working for Foxconn, his poems started to be more and more related to his working and living conditions.

Xu's collection of books while he was in Shenzhen included Juan Rulfo's Pedro Páramo and Adunis's My Loneliness is a Garden.

=== Poetry ===
Xu wrote for a local newspaper in Shenzhen and for his company's journal The Foxconn People. Since 2012, Xu Lizhi had published over 30 works, including poems and reviews. On his days off, he often met with other writers in his factory's library. Meanwhile he continuously published his work online and on magazines and met other working-class poets in person or online.

Xu tried several times to give up his job and work as a librarian. Thus he applied for jobs in Shenzhen's municipal library and in Foxconn's factory library. However, neither of them offered Xu Lizhi a job.

=== Suicide ===
Xu left Foxconn a few days before the 2014 Spring Festival and went to Suzhou to meet his girlfriend. He lost contact with his friends until he returned to Shenzhen in late September 2014, when he signed a new employment contract with Foxconn. On 30 September 2014, Xu killed himself by jumping off a building. Ten hours after his death, on 1 October 2014, China's National Day, Xu's Weibo account released a new blog that was written in advance.

== Responses to his suicide ==
=== Society ===
Media including The Washington Post, Bloomberg News and Time reported Xu's death. On September 30, 2018, four years after Xu's death, the journal "Worker Poets" opened up a special that published selected poems by 26 different poets that mourn Xu Lizhi.

=== Family ===
Xu never let his family know about his poems, so it was only after his death that his brother knew of his poems. According to Xu's brother, "Now every time I try to read his poems, I am not able to read them, because my heart aches so much". Xu's father said: "He should be sorry for his parents for his thoughts became so pessimistic. That nobody offered to solve his pain inside – there was no way out. About whether his poems are good or bad, we are not good enough to know".

=== Foxconn ===
Xu Lizhi's employer made this statement in response to Xu's suicide: "We are saddened by the loss of a young man who was both an employee and a talented poet ... No matter how hard we try, nobody can eliminate this kind of tragic incidents".

=== Fellow worker ===
Xu Lizhi's fellow worker Zhou Qizao mourned Xu Lizhi with the poem Upon Hearing the News of Xu Lizhi's Suicide.

== Legacy ==
Left-wing website libcom.org translated several of Xu's poems and Xu's obituary into English.

Gothic metal singer-songwriter Chelsea Wolfe's fourth studio album Abyss features a song titled "Iron Moon", inspired by Xu's writings and suicide. It is titled after his work "I Swallowed a Moon made of Iron".

Writer and director Qin Xiaoyu complied Xu's work into the book A New Day, named after Xu's last words. Qin also made a documentary about Xu's life and work entitled The Verse of Us, the English version of which is named The Iron Moon, after Xu's work "I Swallow a Moon made of Iron". This documentary was named the year's best documentary in the Guanzhou International Documentary Festival in 2015. A multi-author Chinese poetry anthology named after Xu's work "I Swallow a Moon made of Iron", and containing some of his poetry, compiled by Qin Xiaoyu, was translated into English as Iron Moon: An Anthology of Chinese Migrant Worker Poetry by Eleanor Goodman and was published in 2017.

Antifascist black metal project Cuscuta used four of Xu's poems as lyrics for their 2015 album Fodder for the Callous.

== See also ==
- Foxconn suicides
