= Zang Di =

Chinese poet and critic

Zang Di 臧棣 (born 1964) is a noted Chinese poet, critic, translator and editor from Beijing. He is considered a "leading poet-critic of his generation." His work as an anthologist also is well-known.

== Career ==
Zang Di graduated Peking University with a Ph.D. in Chinese literature in 1997. He currently works as an associate professor at Peking University.

== Awards ==
- Contemporary China’s Top Ten Prominent Young Poets Award (2005)
- China’s Top Ten Rising Poetry Critics Award (2007)
- Chinese Poetry Biennial Top Ten Poets Award (2008)
- The Poet of the Year Award (2008)
