= Pinyin =

Romanization scheme for Standard Chinese

Hanyu Pinyin
- Script type: Alphabet romanization
- Creator: Pinyin Committee: Zhou Youguang
- Published: 11 February 1958; 1982 (ISO 7098)
- Official script: China (from 1958); Singapore (from 1980); United Nations (from 1986); Taiwan (from 2009)
- Languages: Standard Chinese

Chinese name
- Chinese: 拼音
- Literal meaning: spelled sounds
Transcriptions
Standard Mandarin
- Hanyu Pinyin: pīnyīn
- Bopomofo: ㄆㄧㄣ ㄧㄣ
- Wade–Giles: pʻin^{1}-yin^{1}
- Tongyong Pinyin: pin-yin
- IPA: [pʰín.ín]
Wu
- Romanization: phin^{平} in^{平}
Hakka
- Romanization: pin^{24} im^{24}
Yue: Cantonese
- Yale Romanization: pingyām
- Jyutping: ping3 jam1
- Sidney Lau: ping^{3}yam^{1°}
- Canton Romanization: ping^{3}yem^{1}
- IPA: [pʰɪŋ˧ jɐm˥]
Southern Min
- Hokkien POJ: pheng-im
- Tâi-lô: phing-im

Scheme for the Chinese Phonetic Alphabet
- Simplified Chinese: 汉语拼音方案
- Traditional Chinese: 漢語拼音方案
- Literal meaning: scheme of spelled Han language sounds
Transcriptions
Standard Mandarin
- Hanyu Pinyin: Hànyǔ Pīnyīn Fāng'àn
- Bopomofo: ㄏㄢˋ ㄩˇ ㄆㄧㄣ ㄧㄣ ㄈㄤ ㄢˋ
- Gwoyeu Romatzyh: Hannyeu Pinin Fangann
- Wade–Giles: Han^{4}-yü^{3} Pʻin^{1}-yin^{1} Fang^{1}-an^{4}
- Tongyong Pinyin: Hàn-yǔ Pin-yin Fang-àn
- IPA: [xân.ỳ pʰín.ín fáŋ.ân]
Wu
- Romanization: Hoe^{去} nyiu^{上} phin^{平} in^{平} faon^{平} oe^{去}
Hakka
- Romanization: Hon^{55} ngi^{24} pin^{24} im^{24} fong^{24} on^{55}
Yue: Cantonese
- Yale Romanization: Honyúh Pingyām Fōng'on
- Jyutping: Hon3 jyu5 ping3 jam1 fong1 on3
- Sidney Lau: Hon^{3}yue^{5} Ping^{3}yam^{1°} Fong^{1°}on^{3}
- Canton Romanization: Hon^{3}yu^{5} Ping^{3}yem^{1} Fong^{1}on^{3}
- IPA: [hɔ̄ːn.y̬ː pʰēŋ.jɐ́m fɔ́ːŋ.ɔ̄ːn]
Southern Min
- Hokkien POJ: Hàn-gú pheng-im hong-àn
- Tâi-lô: Hàn-gú phing-im hong-àn

Korean name
- Hangul: 한어 병음
- Hanja: 漢語拼音
Transcriptions
- Revised Romanization: haneo byeongeum
- McCune–Reischauer: hanŏ pyŏngŭm

The Chinese Phonetic Alphabet, commonly called Hanyu Pinyin or simply pinyin (pīnyīn), is the most common romanization system for Standard Chinese. Hanyu literally means 'Han language' — that is, the Chinese language — while pinyin literally means 'spelled sounds'. Pinyin is the official romanization system used in China, Singapore and the United Nations. Its use has become the standard method for transliterating Standard Chinese in most regions, though it is less commonly used in Taiwan. It is employed to teach Standard Chinese, normally written with Chinese characters, to students in mainland China and Singapore. Pinyin is also used by various input methods on computers and to categorize entries in some Chinese dictionaries.

In pinyin, each Chinese syllable is spelled in terms of an optional initial and a final, each of which is represented by one or more letters. Initials are initial consonants, whereas finals are all possible combinations of medials (semivowels coming before the vowel), a nucleus vowel, and coda (final vowel or consonant). Diacritics are used to indicate the four tones found in Standard Chinese, though these are often omitted in various contexts, such as when spelling Chinese names in non-Chinese texts.

Hanyu Pinyin was developed in the 1950s by a group of Chinese linguists including Wang Li, Lu Zhiwei, Li Jinxi, Luo Changpei and, particularly, Zhou Youguang, who has been called the "father of pinyin". They based their work in part on earlier romanization systems. The system was originally promulgated at the Fifth Session of the 1st National People's Congress in 1958, and has seen several rounds of revisions since. The International Organization for Standardization propagated Hanyu Pinyin as ISO 7098 in 1982, and the United Nations began using it in 1986. Taiwan adopted Hanyu Pinyin as its official romanization system in 2009, replacing Tongyong Pinyin.

== History ==
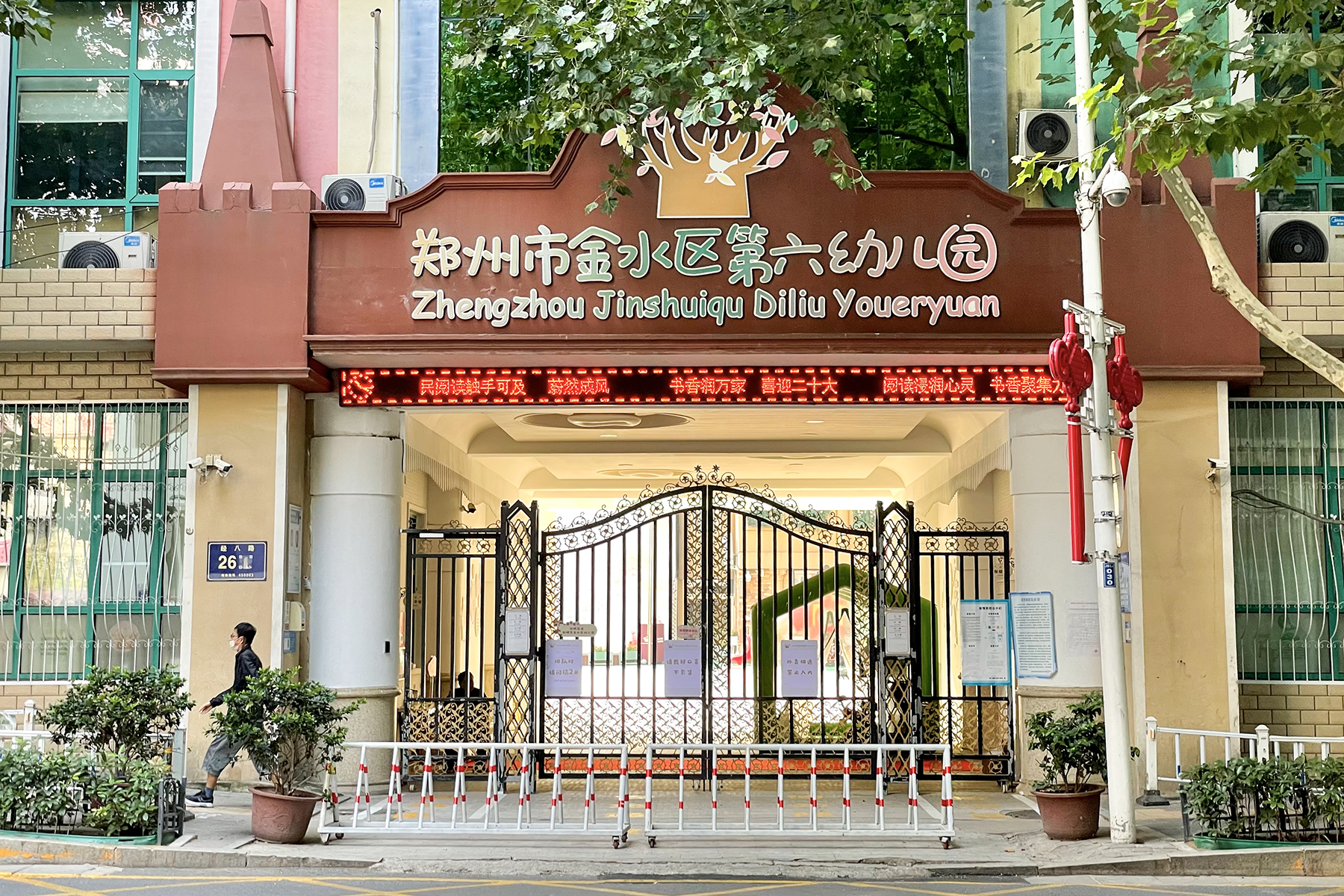
A facade of a kindergarten in Zhengzhou, Henan, with writing using simplified characters and pinyin without tone marks. Note that the pinyin for the third character from left (市/shi) is not provided.

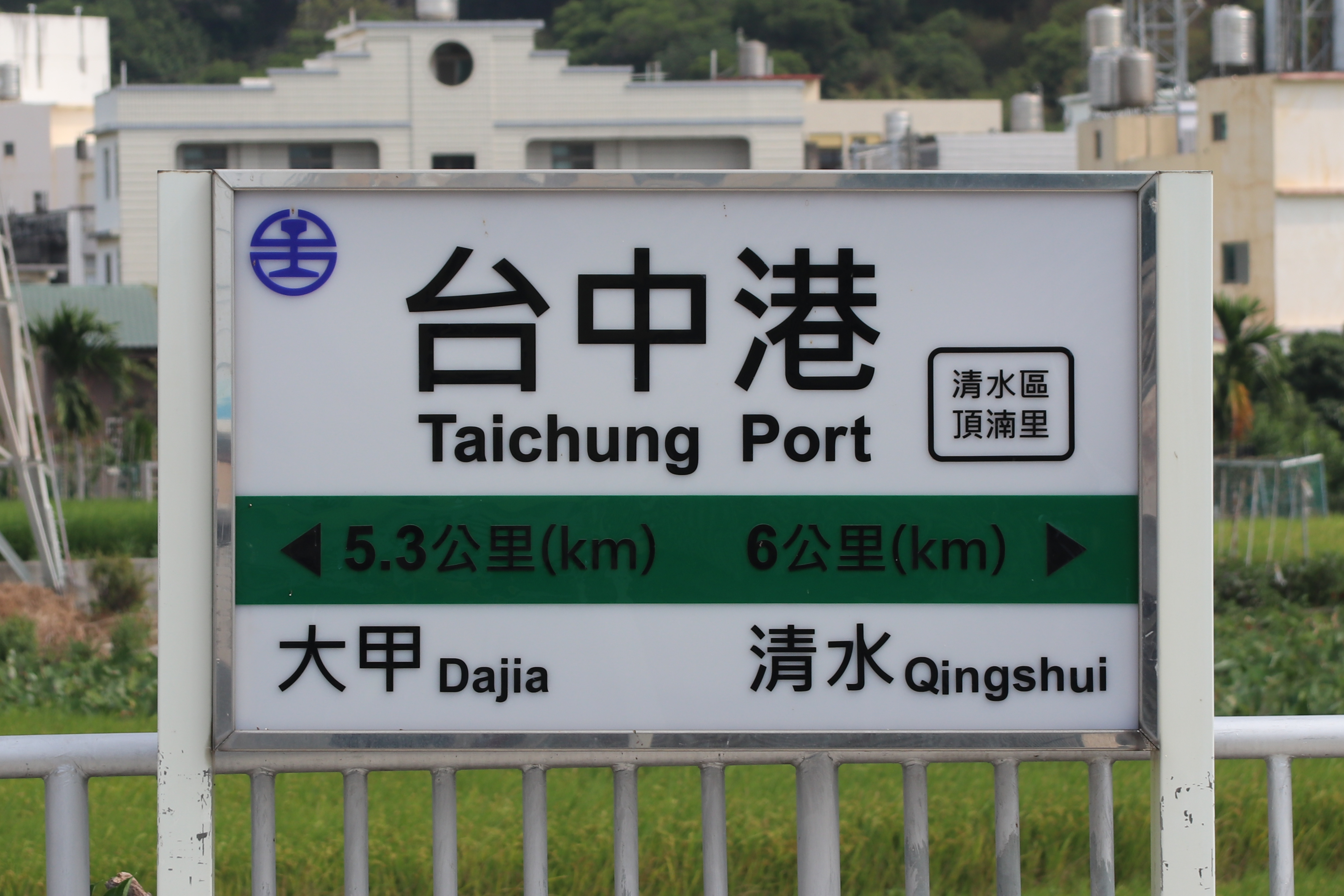
A sign for Taichung Port railway station in Taiwan with writing using traditional characters, English, Wade–Giles (Taichung), and pinyin

=== Background ===
Matteo Ricci, a Jesuit missionary in China, wrote the first book that used the Latin alphabet to write Chinese, entitled Xizi Qiji (Hsi-tzŭ Ch'i-chi; 西字奇蹟; 'Miracle of Western Letters') and published in Beijing in 1605. Twenty years later, fellow Jesuit Nicolas Trigault published 'Aid to the Eyes and Ears of Western Literati' (西儒耳目資; Xīrú ěrmù zī; Hsi ju erh mu tzŭ) in Hangzhou. Neither book had any influence among the contemporary Chinese literati, and the romanizations they introduced primarily were useful for Westerners.

During the late Qing, the reformer Song Shu (1862–1910) proposed that China adopt a phonetic writing system. A student of the scholars Yu Yue and Zhang Taiyan, Song had observed the effect of the kana syllabaries and Western learning during his visits to Japan. While Song did not himself propose a transliteration system for Chinese, his discussion ultimately led to a proliferation of proposed schemes. The Wade–Giles system was produced by Thomas Wade in 1859, and further improved by Herbert Giles, presented in Chinese–English Dictionary (1892). It was popular, and was used in English-language publications outside China until 1979. In 1943, the US military tapped Yale University to develop another romanization system for Mandarin Chinese intended for pilots flying over China—much more than previous systems, the result appears very similar to modern Hanyu Pinyin.

=== Development ===
Hanyu Pinyin was designed by a group of mostly Chinese linguists, including Wang Li, Lu Zhiwei, Li Jinxi, Luo Changpei, as well as Zhou Youguang (1906–2017), an economist by profession, as part of a Chinese government project in the 1950s. Zhou, often called "the father of pinyin", worked as a banker in New York when he decided to return to China to help rebuild the country after the People's Republic was established. Earlier attempts to romanize Chinese writing were mostly abandoned in 1944. Zhou became an economics professor in Shanghai, and when the Ministry of Education created the Committee for the Reform of the Chinese Written Language in 1955, Premier Zhou Enlai assigned him the task of developing a new romanization system, despite the fact that he was not a linguist by trade.

Hanyu Pinyin incorporated different aspects from existing systems, including Gwoyeu Romatzyh (1928), Latinxua Sin Wenz (1931), and the diacritics from bopomofo (1918). "I'm not the father of pinyin", Zhou said years later; "I'm the son of pinyin. It's [the result of] a long tradition from the later years of the Qing dynasty down to today. But we restudied the problem and revisited it and made it more perfect."

An initial draft was authored in January 1956 by Ye Laishi, Lu Zhiwei and Zhou Youguang. A revised Pinyin scheme was proposed by Wang Li, Lu Zhiwei and Li Jinxi, and became the main focus of discussion among the group of Chinese linguists in June 1956, forming the basis of Pinyin standard later after incorporating a wide range of feedback and further revisions. The first edition of Hanyu Pinyin was approved and officially adopted at the Fifth Session of the 1st National People's Congress on 11 February 1958. It was then introduced to primary schools as a way to teach Standard Chinese pronunciation and used to improve the literacy rate among adults.

Despite its formal promulgation, pinyin did not become widely used until after the tumult of the Cultural Revolution. In the 1980s, students were trained in pinyin from an early age, learning it in tandem with characters or even before.

During the height of the Cold War the use of pinyin system over Wade–Giles and Yale romanizations outside of China was regarded as a political statement or identification with the mainland Chinese government. Beginning in the early 1980s, Western publications addressing mainland China began using the Hanyu Pinyin romanization system instead of earlier romanization systems; this change followed the Joint Communiqué on the Establishment of Diplomatic Relations between the United States and China in 1979. In 2001, the Chinese government issued the National Common Language Law, providing a legal basis for applying pinyin. The current specification of the orthography is GB/T 16159–2012.

== Syllables ==
Chinese phonology is generally described in terms of initials (声母; 聲母; shēngmǔ) and finals (韵母; 韻母; yùnmǔ). This is distinct from the concept of consonant and vowel sounds as basic units in traditional (and most other phonetic systems used to describe the Chinese language). Every syllable in Standard Chinese can be described as a pair of one initial and one final, except for the special syllable er or when a trailing -r is considered part of a syllable (a phenomenon known as erhua). The latter case, though a common practice in some sub-dialects, is rarely used in official publications.

While initials are usually a single consonant, finals are not always simple vowels, especially in compound finals (复韵母; 複韻母; fùyùnmǔ), i.e. when a "medial" is placed in front of the final. For example, the medials [i] and [u] are pronounced with such tight openings at the beginning of a final that some native Chinese speakers (especially when singing) pronounce yī (衣; 'clothes'), officially pronounced /í/, as /jí/ and wéi (围; 圍; 'to enclose'), officially pronounced /uěi/, as /wěi/ or /wuěi/. Often these medials are treated as separate from the finals rather than as part of them; this convention is followed in the chart of finals below.

=== Initials ===
The conventional lexicographical order derived from Bopomofo is:

b p m f	d t n l	g k h	j q x	zh ch sh r	z c s

In each cell below, the pinyin letters assigned to each initial are accompanied by their phonetic realizations in brackets, notated according to the International Phonetic Alphabet.

Place Manner		Labial	Alveolar	Retroflex	Alveolo-palatal	Velar
Plosive	unaspirated	b [p]	d [t]			g [k]
Plosive	aspirated	p [pʰ]	t [tʰ]			k [kʰ]
Nasal		m [m]	n [n]			
Affricate	unaspirated		z [ts]	zh [ʈʂ]	j [tɕ]	
Affricate	aspirated		c [tsʰ]	ch [ʈʂʰ]	q [tɕʰ]	
Fricative		f [f]	s [s]	sh [ʂ]	x [ɕ]	h [x]
Liquid			l [l]	r [ɻ]~[ʐ]		
Semivowel		y [j], yu [ɥ] and w [w]				

Pinyin	IPA	Description
b	[p]	Unaspirated p, like in English spark.
p	[pʰ]	Strongly aspirated p, like in English pay.
m	[m]	Like the m in English may.
f	[f]	Aspirated. Like the f in English fair.
d	[t]	Unaspirated t, like in English stop.
t	[tʰ]	Strongly aspirated t, like in English take.
n	[n]	Like the n in English nay.
l	[l]	Like the l in English lay.
g	[k]	Unaspirated k, like in English skill.
k	[kʰ]	Strongly aspirated k, like in English kiss.
h	[x]~[h] (Note: for Taiwanese Mandarin)	Varies between the h in English hat, and the ch in Scottish English loch.
j	[tɕ]	Alveolo-palatal, unaspirated. No direct equivalent in English, but similar to the j in English jeep.
q	[tɕʰ]	Alveolo-palatal, aspirated. No direct equivalent in English, but similar to the ch in English punchy.
x	[ɕ]	Alveolo-palatal, aspirated. No direct equivalent in English, but similar to the sh in English push.
zh	[ʈʂ]	Retroflex, unaspirated. No direct equivalent in English, but similar to the j in English jack.
ch	[ʈʂʰ]	Retroflex, aspirated. No direct equivalent in English, but similar to the ch in English church .
sh	[ʂ]	Retroflex, aspirated. No direct equivalent in English, but similar to the sh in English shirt.
r	[ɻ~ʐ]~[ɹ]	Retroflex. No direct equivalent in English, but varies between the r in English reduce and the s in English measure.
z	[ts]	Unaspirated. Like the ds in English lads.
c	[tsʰ]	Aspirated. Like the ts in English bats.
s	[s]	Aspirated. Like the s in English say.
w (Note: Y, w, and yu are equivalent to the semivowel medials i, u, and ü (see below). They are spelled differently when there is no initial consonant in order to mark a new syllable: fanguan is fan-guan, while fangwan is fang-wan (and equivalent to *fang-uan). With this convention, an apostrophe only needs to be used to mark an initial a or e, e.g. Xi'an (two syllables: [ɕi.an]) vs. xian (one syllable: [ɕi̯ɛn]). In addition, y and w are added to fully vocalic i, u, and ü when these occur without an initial consonant, so that they are written yi, wu, and yu. Some Mandarin speakers do pronounce a [j] or [w] sound at the beginning of such words—that is, yi [i] or [ji], wu [u] or [wu], yu [y] or [ɥy],—so this is an intuitive convention. See below for a few finals which are abbreviated after a consonant plus w/u or y/i medial: wen → C+un, wei → C+ui, weng → C+ong, and you → Q+iu.)	[w]	Like the w in English water.
y	[j]	Like the y in English yes.
yu	[ɥ]	Like the hu in French huit, see below.

=== Finals ===
In each cell below, the first line indicates the International Phonetic Alphabet (IPA) transcription, the second indicates pinyin for a standalone (no-initial) form, and the third indicates pinyin for a combination with an initial. Other than finals modified by an -r, which are omitted, the following is an exhaustive table of all possible finals.

The only syllable-final consonants in Standard Chinese are -n, -ng, and -r, the last of which is attached as a grammatical suffix. A Chinese syllable ending with any other consonant either is from a non-Mandarin language (a southern Chinese language such as Cantonese, reflecting final consonants in Old Chinese), or indicates the use of a non-pinyin romanization system, such as one that uses final consonants to indicate tones.

Rime Medial	∅	-e / -o / -ê		-a	-ei	-ai	-ou	-ao	-en	-an	-ong	-eng	-ang	er
∅	[ɨ]: -i	[ɤ]: e; -e	[ɛ]: ê; -ê	[a]: a; -a	[ei̯]: ei; -ei	[ai̯]: ai; -ai	[ou̯]: ou; -ou	[au̯]: ao; -ao	[ən]: en; -en	[an]: an; -an	[ʊŋ]: -ong	[əŋ]: eng; -eng	[aŋ]: ang; -ang	[ɚ]: er
y-; -i-	[i]: yi; -i	[je]: ye; -ie		[ja]: ya; -ia			[jou̯] ([iu̯]): you; -iu	[jau̯]: yao; -iao	[in]: yin; -in	[jɛn]: yan; -ian	[jʊŋ]: yong; -iong	[iŋ]: ying; -ing	[jaŋ]: yang; -iang	
w-; -u-	[u]: wu; -u	[wo]: wo; -uo		[wa]: wa; -ua	[wei̯] ([ui̯]): wei; -ui	[wai̯]: wai; -uai			[wən] ([un]): wen; -un	[wan]: wan; -uan		[wəŋ]: weng	[waŋ]: wang; -uang	
yu-; -ü-	[y]: yu; -ü	[ɥe]: yue; -üe							[yn]: yun; -ün	[ɥɛn]: yuan; -üan				

Technically, i, u, ü without a following vowel are finals, not medials, and therefore take the tone marks, but they are more concisely displayed as above. In addition, ê [ɛ] (欸; 誒) and syllabic nasals m (呒, 呣), n (嗯, 唔), ng (嗯, 𠮾) are used as interjections or in neologisms; for example, pinyin defines the names of several pinyin letters using -ê finals.

According to the Scheme for the Chinese Phonetic Alphabet, ng can be abbreviated with the shorthand ŋ. However, this shorthand is rarely used due to difficulty of entering it on computers.

Pinyin	IPA	Form with zero initial	Explanation
-i	[ɹ̩~z̩], [ɻ̩~ʐ̩]	—N/a	-i is a buzzed continuation (see syllabic fricatives) of the consonant following z-, c-, s-, zh-, ch-, sh- or r-. In all other cases, -i has the sound of bee.
a	[a]	a	like English father, but a bit more fronted
e	[ɤ], [ə] (Note: for Taiwanese Mandarin)	e	a back, unrounded vowel (similar to English duh, but not as open). Pronounced as a sequence [ɰɤ].
ai	[ai̯]	ai	like English eye, but a bit lighter
ei	[ei̯]	ei	as in hey
ao	[au̯]	ao	approximately as in cow; the a is much more audible than the o
ou	[ou̯]	ou	as in North American English so
an	[an]	an	like British English ban, but more central
en	[ən]	en	as in taken
ang	[aŋ]	ang	as in German Angst. (Starts with the vowel sound in father and ends in the velar nasal; like song in some dialects of American English)
eng	[əŋ]	eng	like e in en above but with ng appended
ong	[ʊŋ]~[o̞ʊŋ]	(weng)	starts with the vowel sound in book and ends with the velar nasal sound in sing. Varies between [oŋ] and [uŋ] depending on the speaker.
er	[aɚ̯]~[əɹ]	er	Similar to the sound in bar in English. Can also be pronounced [ɚ] depending on the speaker.
Finals beginning with i- (y-)
i	[i]	yi	like English bee
ia	[ja]	ya	as i + a; like English yard
ie	[je]	ye	as i + ê where the e (compare with the ê interjection) is pronounced shorter and lighter
iao	[jau̯]	yao	as i + ao
iu	[jou̯]	you	as i + ou
ian	[jɛn]	yan	as i + an; like English yen. Varies between [jen] and [jan] depending on the speaker.
in	[in]	yin	as i + n
iang	[jaŋ]	yang	as i + ang
ing	[iŋ]	ying	as i + ng
iong	[jʊŋ]	yong	as i + ong. Varies between [joŋ] and [juŋ] depending on the speaker.
Finals beginning with u- (w-)
u	[u]	wu	like English oo
ua	[wa]	wa	as u + a
uo/o	[wo]	wo	as u + o where the o (compare with the o interjection) is pronounced shorter and lighter (spelled as o after b, p, m or f)
uai	[wai̯]	wai	as u + ai, as in English why
ui	[wei̯]	wei	as u + ei, as in English way
uan	[wan]	wan	as u + an
un	[wən]	wen	as u + en; as in English won
uang	[waŋ]	wang	as u + ang
(ong)	[wəŋ]	weng	as u + eng
Finals beginning with ü- (yu-)
ü	[y]	yu	as in German über or French lune (pronounced as English ee with rounded lips; spelled as u after j, q or x)
üe	[ɥe]	yue	as ü + ê where the e (compare with the ê interjection) is pronounced shorter and lighter (spelled as ue after j, q or x)
üan	[ɥɛn]	yuan	as ü + an. Varies between [ɥen] and [ɥan] depending on the speaker (spelled as uan after j, q or x)
ün	[yn]	yun	as ü + n (spelled as un after j, q or x)
Interjections
ê	[ɛ]	ê	as in bet
o	[ɔ]	o	approximately as in British English office; the lips are much more rounded
io	[jɔ]	yo	as i + o

==== The ⟨ü⟩ sound ====
An umlaut is added to ⟨u⟩ when it occurs after the initials ⟨l⟩ and ⟨n⟩ when necessary in order to represent the sound [y]. This is necessary in order to distinguish the front high rounded vowel in lü (e.g. 驴; 驢; 'donkey') from the back high rounded vowel in lu (e.g. 炉; 爐; 'oven'). Tonal markers are placed above the umlaut, as in lǘ.

However, the ü is not used in the other contexts where it could represent a front high rounded vowel, namely after the letters j, q, x, and y. For example, the sound of the word for 'fish' (鱼; 魚) is transcribed in pinyin simply as yú, not as *yǘ. This practice is opposed to Wade–Giles, which always uses ü, and Tongyong Pinyin, which always uses yu. Whereas Wade–Giles needs the umlaut to distinguish between chü (pinyin ju) and chu (pinyin zhu), this ambiguity does not arise with pinyin, so the more convenient form ju is used instead of jü. Genuine ambiguities only happen with nu/nü and lu/lü, which are then distinguished by an umlaut.

Many fonts or output methods do not support an umlaut for ü or cannot place tone marks on top of ü. Likewise, using ü in input methods is difficult because it is not present as a simple key on many keyboard layouts. For these reasons v is sometimes used instead by convention. For example, it is common for cellphones to use v instead of ü. Additionally, some stores in China use v instead of ü in the transliteration of their names. The drawback is a lack of precomposed characters and limited font support for combining accents on the letter v, (v̄ v́ v̌ v̀).

This also presents a problem in transcribing names for use on passports, affecting people with names that consist of the sound lü or nü, particularly people with the surname 吕 (Lǚ), a fairly common surname, particularly compared to the surnames 陆 (Lù), 鲁 (Lǔ), 卢 (Lú) and 路 (Lù). Previously, the practice varied among different passport issuing offices, with some transcribing as "LV" and "NV" while others used "LU" and "NU". On 10 July 2012, the Ministry of Public Security standardized the practice to use "LYU" and "NYU" in passports.

Although nüe written as nue, and lüe written as lue are not ambiguous, nue or lue are not correct according to the rules; nüe and lüe should be used instead. However, some Chinese input methods support both nve/lve (typing v for ü) and nue/lue.

== Tones ==
Relative pitch changes of the four tones

The pinyin system also uses four diacritics to mark the tones of Mandarin. In the pinyin system, four main tones of Mandarin are shown by diacritics: ā, á, ǎ, and à. There is no symbol or diacritic for the neutral tone: a. The diacritic is placed over the letter that represents the syllable nucleus, unless that letter is missing. Tones are used in Hanyu Pinyin symbols, and they do not appear in Chinese characters.

Tones are written on the finals of Chinese pinyin. If the tone mark is written over an i, then it replaces the tittle, as in yī.

1. The first tone (flat or high-level tone) is represented by a macron ⟨ˉ⟩ added to the pinyin vowel:
  ā ē ê̄ ī ō ū ǖ Ā Ē Ê̄ Ī Ō Ū Ǖ
2. The second tone (rising or high-rising tone) is denoted by an acute accent ⟨ˊ⟩:
  á é ế í ó ú ǘ Á É Ế Í Ó Ú Ǘ
3. The third tone (falling-rising or low tone) is marked by a caron ⟨ˇ⟩:
  ǎ ě ê̌ ǐ ǒ ǔ ǚ Ǎ Ě Ê̌ Ǐ Ǒ Ǔ Ǚ
4. The fourth tone (falling or high-falling tone) is represented by a grave accent ⟨ˋ⟩:
  à è ề ì ò ù ǜ À È Ề Ì Ò Ù Ǜ
5. The fifth tone (neutral tone) is represented by a normal vowel without any accent mark:
  a e ê i o u ü A E Ê I O U Ü

In dictionaries, neutral tone may be indicated by a dot preceding the syllable—e.g. ·ma. When a neutral tone syllable has an alternative pronunciation in another tone, a combination of tone marks may be used: zhī·dào (知道) may be pronounced either zhīdào or zhīdao.

=== Numbers ===
Before the advent of computers, many typewriter fonts did not contain vowels with macron or caron diacritics. Tones were thus represented by placing a tone number at the end of individual syllables. For example, tóng is written tong^{2}. Each tone can be denoted with its numeral in the order listed above. The neutral tone can either be denoted with no numeral, with 0, or with 5.

Tone	Examples	IPA
1	mā (macron); ma^{1}	ma˥
2	má (acute accent); ma^{2}	ma˧˥
3	mǎ (caron); ma^{3}	ma˨˩˦
4	mà (grave accent); ma^{4}	ma˥˩
Neutral	ma; ·ma (middle dot); ma^{0}; ma^{5}	ma

=== Placement and omission ===
Briefly, tone marks should always be placed in the order a, e, o, i, u, ü, with the only exception being iu where the tone mark is placed on the second vowel instead. Pinyin tone marks appear primarily above the syllable nucleus—e.g. as in kuài, where k is the initial, u the medial, a the nucleus, and i is the coda. There is an exception for syllabic nasals like /m/, where the nucleus of the syllable is a consonant: there, the diacritic will be carried by a written dummy vowel.

When the nucleus is /ə/ (written e or o), and there is both a medial and a coda, the nucleus may be dropped from writing. In this case, when the coda is a consonant n or ng, the only vowel left is the medial i, u, or ü, and so this takes the diacritic. However, when the coda is a vowel, it is the coda rather than the medial which takes the diacritic in the absence of a written nucleus. This occurs with syllables ending in -ui (from wei: wèi → -uì) and in -iu (from you: yòu → -iù). That is, in the absence of a written nucleus the finals have priority for receiving the tone marker, as long as they are vowels; if not, the medial takes the diacritic.

An algorithm to find the correct vowel letter (when there is more than one) is as follows:

1. If there is an a or an e, it will take the tone mark
2. In the combination ou, then the o takes the tone mark
3. Otherwise, the second vowel takes the tone mark

Worded differently,

1. If there is an a, e, or o, it will take the tone mark; in the case of ao, the mark goes on the a
2. Otherwise, the vowels are -iu or -ui, in which case the second vowel takes the tone mark

The above can be summarized as the following table. The vowel letter taking the tone mark is indicated by the fourth-tone mark.

Placement of the pinyin tone mark
	-a	-e	-o	-i	-u
a-			ào	ài	
e-				èi	
o-					òu
i-	ià, iào	iè	iò(ng)		iù
u-	uà, uài		uò	uì	
ü-	üà(n), uà(n)	üè, uè			

=== Tone sandhi ===
Tone sandhi is not ordinarily reflected in pinyin spelling.

== Spacing ==
Standard Chinese has many polysyllabic words. Like in other writing systems using the Latin alphabet, spacing in pinyin is officially based on word boundaries. However, there are often ambiguities in partitioning a word. The Basic Rules of the Chinese Phonetic Alphabet Orthography were put into effect in 1988 by the National Educational and National Language commissions. These rules became a GB recommendation in 1996, and were last updated in 2012.

In practice, however, published materials in China now often space pinyin syllable by syllable. According to Victor H. Mair, this practice became widespread after the Script Reform Committee, previously under direct control of the State Council, had its power greatly weakened in 1985 when it was renamed the State Language Commission and placed under the Ministry of Education. Mair claims that proponents of Chinese characters in the educational bureaucracy "became alarmed that word-based pinyin was becoming a de facto alternative to Chinese characters as a script for writing Mandarin and demanded that all pinyin syllables be written separately."

== Comparison with other orthographies ==
Pinyin superseded older romanization systems such as Wade–Giles and postal romanization, and replaced bopomofo as the method of Chinese phonetic instruction in mainland China. The ISO adopted pinyin as the standard romanization for modern Chinese in 1982 (ISO 7098:1982, superseded by ISO 7098:2015). The United Nations followed suit in 1986. It has also been accepted by the government of Singapore, the United States's Library of Congress, the American Library Association, and many other international institutions.

Compared to Wade–Giles, pinyin more accurately reflects the aspiration distinction for English speakers, but assigns some Latin letters sound values which are quite different from those of most languages. This has drawn some criticism as it may lead to confusion when uninformed speakers apply either native or English assumed pronunciations to words. However, this problem is not limited to pinyin, since many languages that use the Latin alphabet natively also assign different values to the same letters. A 2014 overview of topics in Chinese writing and literacy claimed, "By and large, pinyin represents the Chinese sounds better than the Wade–Giles system, and does so with fewer extra marks.".

As pinyin is a phonetic writing system for modern Standard Chinese, it is not designed to replace characters for writing Literary Chinese, the standard written language prior to the early 20th century. In particular, Chinese characters retain semantic cues that help distinguish differently pronounced words in the ancient classical language that are now homophones in Mandarin. Thus, Chinese characters remain indispensable for recording and transmitting the corpus of Chinese writing from the past.

Pinyin is not designed to transcribe varieties other than Standard Chinese, which is based on the phonological system of Beijing Mandarin. Other romanization schemes have been devised to transcribe those other Chinese varieties, such as Jyutping for Cantonese and Pe̍h-ōe-jī for Hokkien.

=== Comparison charts ===
Vowels a, e, o
IPA	a	ɔ	ɛ	ɤ	ai	ei	au	ou	an	ən	aŋ	əŋ	ʊŋ	aɹ
Pinyin	a	o	ê	e	ai	ei	ao	ou	an	en	ang	eng	ong	er
Tongyong Pinyin	a	o	ê	e	ai	ei	ao	ou	an	en	ang	eng	ong	er
Wade–Giles	a	o	eh	ê/o	ai	ei	ao	ou	an	ên	ang	êng	ung	êrh
Bopomofo	ㄚ	ㄛ	ㄝ	ㄜ	ㄞ	ㄟ	ㄠ	ㄡ	ㄢ	ㄣ	ㄤ	ㄥ	ㄨㄥ	ㄦ
example	阿	喔	誒	俄	艾	黑	凹	偶	安	恩	昂	冷	中	二

Vowels i, u, y
IPA	i	je	jou	jɛn	in	iŋ	jʊŋ	u	wo	wei	wən	wəŋ	y	ɥe	ɥɛn	yn
Pinyin	yi	ye	you	yan	yin	ying	yong	wu	wo/o	wei	wen	weng	yu	yue	yuan	yun
Tongyong Pinyin	yi	ye	you	yan	yin	ying	yong	wu	wo/o	wei	wun	wong	yu	yue	yuan	yun
Wade–Giles	i/yi	yeh	yu	yen	yin	ying	yung	wu	wo/o	wei	wên	wêng	yü	yüeh	yüan	yün
Bopomofo	ㄧ	ㄧㄝ	ㄧㄡ	ㄧㄢ	ㄧㄣ	ㄧㄥ	ㄩㄥ	ㄨ	ㄨㄛ/ㄛ	ㄨㄟ	ㄨㄣ	ㄨㄥ	ㄩ	ㄩㄝ	ㄩㄢ	ㄩㄣ
example	一	也	又	言	音	英	用	五	我	位	文	翁	玉	月	元	雲

Non-sibilant consonants
IPA	p	pʰ	m	fəŋ	tjou	twei	twən	tʰɤ	ny	ly	kɤ	kʰɤ	xɤ
Pinyin	b	p	m	feng	diu	dui	dun	te	nü	lü	ge	ke	he
Tongyong Pinyin	b	p	m	fong	diou	duei	dun	te	nyu	lyu	ge	ke	he
Wade–Giles	p	pʻ	m	fêng	tiu	tui	tun	tʻê	nü	lü	ko	kʻo	ho
Bopomofo	ㄅ	ㄆ	ㄇ	ㄈㄥ	ㄉㄧㄡ	ㄉㄨㄟ	ㄉㄨㄣ	ㄊㄜ	ㄋㄩ	ㄌㄩ	ㄍㄜ	ㄎㄜ	ㄏㄜ
example	玻	婆	末	封	丟	兌	頓	特	女	旅	歌	可	何

Sibilant consonants
IPA	tɕjɛn	tɕjʊŋ	tɕʰin	ɕɥɛn	ʈʂɤ	ʈʂɨ	ʈʂʰɤ	ʈʂʰɨ	ʂɤ	ʂɨ	ɻɤ	ɻɨ	tsɤ	tswo	tsɨ	tsʰɤ	tsʰwo	tsʰɨ	sɤ	swo	sɨ
Pinyin	jian	jiong	qin	xuan	zhe	zhi	che	chi	she	shi	re	ri	ze	zuo	zi	ce	cuo	ci	se	suo	si
Tongyong Pinyin	jian	jyong	cin	syuan	jhe	jhih	che	chih	she	shih	re	rih	ze	zuo	zih	ce	cuo	cih	se	suo	sih
Wade–Giles	chien	chiung	chʻin	hsüan	chê	chih	chʻê	chʻih	shê	shih	jê	jih	tsê	tso	tzŭ	tsʻê	tsʻo	tzʻŭ	sê	so	ssŭ
Bopomofo	ㄐㄧㄢ	ㄐㄩㄥ	ㄑㄧㄣ	ㄒㄩㄢ	ㄓㄜ	ㄓ	ㄔㄜ	ㄔ	ㄕㄜ	ㄕ	ㄖㄜ	ㄖ	ㄗㄜ	ㄗㄨㄛ	ㄗ	ㄘㄜ	ㄘㄨㄛ	ㄘ	ㄙㄜ	ㄙㄨㄛ	ㄙ
example	件	囧	秦	宣	哲	之	扯	赤	社	是	惹	日	仄	左	字	策	撮	次	色	索	斯

Tones
IPA	ma˥	ma˧˥	ma˨˩˦	ma˥˩	ma
Pinyin	mā	má	mǎ	mà	ma
Tongyong Pinyin	ma	má	mǎ	mà	må
Wade–Giles	ma^{1}	ma^{2}	ma^{3}	ma^{4}	ma
Bopomofo	ㄇㄚ	ㄇㄚˊ	ㄇㄚˇ	ㄇㄚˋ	˙ㄇㄚ
example (Chinese characters)	媽	麻	馬	罵	嗎

== Typography and encoding ==
Based on the "Chinese Romanization" section of ISO 7098:2015, pinyin tone marks should use the symbols from Combining Diacritical Marks, as opposed by the use of Spacing Modifier Letters in bopomofo. Lowercase letters with tone marks are included in GB 2312 and their uppercase counterparts are included in JIS X 0212; thus Unicode includes all the common accented characters from pinyin. Other punctuation mark and symbols in Chinese are to use the equivalent symbol in English noted in to GB 15834.

According to GB 16159, all accented letters are required to have both uppercase and lowercase characters as per their normal counterparts.

Accent alphabets in Hanyu Pinyin^{[a]}^{[b]}
Letter		First tone	Second tone	Third tone	Fourth tone
Combining Diacritical Marks		◌̄ (U+0304)	◌́ (U+0301)	◌̌ (U+030C)	◌̀ (U+0300)
Common letters
Uppercase	A	Ā (U+0100)	Á (U+00C1)	Ǎ (U+01CD)	À (U+00C0)
Uppercase	E	Ē (U+0112)	É (U+00C9)	Ě (U+011A)	È (U+00C8)
Uppercase	I	Ī (U+012A)	Í (U+00CD)	Ǐ (U+01CF)	Ì (U+00CC)
Uppercase	O	Ō (U+014C)	Ó (U+00D3)	Ǒ (U+01D1)	Ò (U+00D2)
Uppercase	U	Ū (U+016A)	Ú (U+00DA)	Ǔ (U+01D3)	Ù (U+00D9)
Uppercase	Ü (U+00DC)	Ǖ (U+01D5)	Ǘ (U+01D7)	Ǚ (U+01D9)	Ǜ (U+01DB)
Lowercase	a	ā (U+0101)	á (U+00E1)	ǎ (U+01CE)	à (U+00E0)
Lowercase	e	ē (U+0113)	é (U+00E9)	ě (U+011B)	è (U+00E8)
Lowercase	i	ī (U+012B)	í (U+00ED)	ǐ (U+01D0)	ì (U+00EC)
Lowercase	o	ō (U+014D)	ó (U+00F3)	ǒ (U+01D2)	ò (U+00F2)
Lowercase	u	ū (U+016B)	ú (U+00FA)	ǔ (U+01D4)	ù (U+00F9)
Lowercase	ü (U+00FC)	ǖ (U+01D6)	ǘ (U+01D8)	ǚ (U+01DA)	ǜ (U+01DC)
Rare letters
Uppercase	Ê (U+00CA)	Ê̄ (U+00CA U+0304)	Ế (U+1EBE)	Ê̌ (U+00CA U+030C)	Ề (U+1EC0)
Uppercase	M	M̄ (U+004D U+0304)	Ḿ (U+1E3E)	M̌ (U+004D U+030C)	M̀ (U+004D U+0300)
Uppercase	N	N̄ (U+004E U+0304)	Ń (U+0143)	Ň (U+0147)	Ǹ (U+01F8)
Lowercase	ê (U+00EA)	ê̄ (U+00EA U+0304)	ế (U+1EBF)	ê̌ (U+00EA U+030C)	ề (U+1EC1)
Lowercase	m	m̄ (U+006D U+0304)	ḿ (U+1E3F)	m̌ (U+006D U+030C)	m̀ (U+006D U+0300)
Lowercase	n	n̄ (U+006E U+0304)	ń (U+0144)	ň (U+0148)	ǹ (U+01F9)
Notes a. Yellow cells indicate that there are no single Unicode character for that letter; the character shown here uses Combining Diacritical Mark characters to display the letter. b. Grey cells indicate that Xiandai Hanyu Cidian does not include pinyin with that specific letter.

GBK has mapped two characters ⟨ḿ⟩ and ⟨ǹ⟩ to Private Use Areas in Unicode respectively, thus some fonts (e.g. SimSun) that adhere to GBK include both characters in the Private Use Areas, and some input methods (e.g. Sogou Pinyin) also outputs the Private Use Areas code point instead of the original character. As the superset GB 18030 changed the mappings of ⟨ḿ⟩ and ⟨ǹ⟩, this has caused an issue where the input methods and font files use different encoding standards, and thus the input and output of both characters are mixed up.

Shorthand pinyin letters
Uppercase	Lowercase	Note	Example
Ĉ (U+0108)	ĉ (U+0109)	Abbreviation of ch	长; 長 can be spelled as ĉáŋ
Ŝ (U+015C)	ŝ (U+015D)	Abbreviation of sh	伤; 傷 can be spelled as ŝāŋ
Ẑ (U+1E90)	ẑ (U+1E91)	Abbreviation of zh	张; 張 can be spelled as Ẑāŋ
Ŋ (U+014A)	ŋ (U+014B)	Abbreviation of ng	让; 讓 can be spelled as ràŋ; 嗯 can be spelled as ŋ̀

Other symbols are used in pinyin are as follows:

Symbol comparison
Chinese	Pinyin	Usage	Example
U+3002 。 IDEOGRAPHIC FULL STOP	U+002E . FULL STOP	End of sentence	你好。 Nǐ hǎo.
U+FF0C ， FULLWIDTH COMMA; U+3001 、 IDEOGRAPHIC COMMA	U+002C , COMMA	Connecting clauses	你，好吗？ Nǐ, hǎo ma?
U+2014 — EM DASH (×2)	U+2014 — EM DASH	Division of clauses mid-sentence	枢纽部分——中央大厅 shūniǔ bùfèn — zhōngyāng dàtīng
U+2026 … HORIZONTAL ELLIPSIS (×2)	U+2026 … HORIZONTAL ELLIPSIS	Redaction of part of a passage	我…… Wǒ…
—N/a	U+00B7 · MIDDLE DOT	Neutral tone marker placed before the syllable	吗 ·ma
—N/a	U+002D - HYPHEN-MINUS	Hyphenation of abbreviated compounds	公关 gōng-guān
—N/a	U+0027 ' APOSTROPHE	Syllable segmentation	西安 - Xī'ān (compared to 先 - xiān)

It is commonly recommended that pinyin annotations use a typeface with a single-story 'a' (ɑ) and 'g' (g) and a second-tone mark (◌́) that is thicker at the bottom. However, there is no official restriction on the form of 'a' and 'g'.

== Usage ==
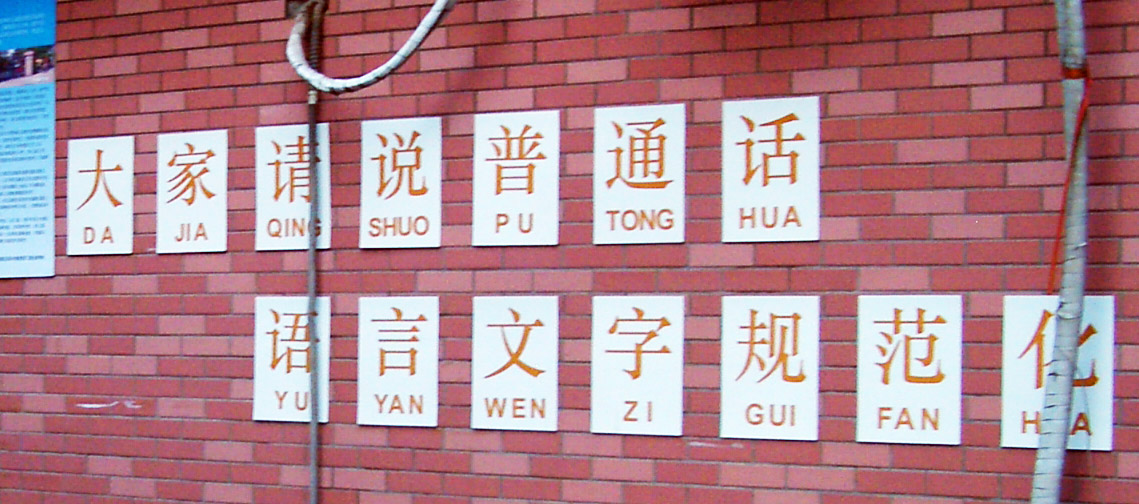
A slogan written on a school wall featuring pinyin annotations without tonal marks or word grouping

The spelling of Chinese geographical or personal names in pinyin has become the most common way to transcribe them in English. Pinyin has also become the dominant Chinese input method in mainland China, in contrast to Taiwan, where bopomofo is most commonly used.

Families outside of Taiwan who speak Mandarin as a mother tongue use pinyin to help children associate characters with spoken words which they already know. Children start to learn it in kindergarten, but pinyin disappears from textbooks after primary school. Chinese families outside of Taiwan who speak some other language as their mother tongue use the system to teach children Mandarin pronunciation when learning vocabulary in elementary school.

Since 1958, pinyin has been actively used in adult education as well, making it easier for formerly illiterate people to continue with self-study after a short period of pinyin literacy instruction.

Pinyin has become a tool for many non-native speakers to learn Mandarin pronunciation, and is used to explain both the grammar and spoken Mandarin coupled with Chinese characters. Books containing both Chinese characters and pinyin are often used by non-native speakers learning Chinese. Pinyin's role in teaching pronunciation to non-native speakers and children is similar in some respects to furigana-based books with hiragana letters written alongside kanji (directly analogous to bopomofo) in Japanese, or fully vocalized texts in Arabic.

The tone-marking diacritics are commonly omitted in popular news stories and even in scholarly works, as well as in the traditional Mainland Chinese Braille system, which is similar to pinyin, but meant for blind readers. This results in some degree of ambiguity as to which words are being represented.

=== Computer input ===
Simple computer systems, sometimes only able to use simple character systems for text, such as the 7-bit ASCII standard—essentially the 26 Latin letters, 10 digits, and punctuation marks—long provided a convincing argument for using unaccented pinyin instead of diacritical pinyin or Chinese characters. Today, however, most computer systems are able to display characters from Chinese and many other writing systems as well, and have them entered with a Latin keyboard using an input method editor. Alternatively, some touchscreen devices allow users to input characters graphically by writing with a stylus, with concurrent online handwriting recognition.

Pinyin with accents can be entered with the use of special keyboard layouts or various other utilities.

=== Sorting techniques ===
Chinese text can be sorted by its pinyin representation, which is often useful for looking up words whose pronunciations are known, but not whose character forms are not known. Chinese characters and words can be sorted for convenient lookup by their Pinyin expressions alphabetically. Identical syllables are then further sorted by tone number, ascending, with neutral tones placed last.

Words of multiple characters can be sorted in two different ways, either per character, as is used in the Xiandai Hanyu Cidian, or by the whole word's string, which is only then sorted by tone. This method is used in the ABC Chinese–English Dictionary.

=== By region ===
==== Taiwan ====
Between October 2002 and January 2009, Taiwan used Tongyong Pinyin, a domestic modification of Hanyu Pinyin, as its official romanization system. Thereafter, it began to promote the use of Hanyu Pinyin instead. Tongyong Pinyin was designed to romanize varieties spoken on the island in addition to Standard Chinese. The ruling Kuomintang (KMT) party resisted its adoption, preferring the system by then used in mainland China and internationally. Romanization preferences quickly became associated with issues of national identity. Preferences split along party lines: the KMT and its affiliated parties in the Pan-Blue Coalition supported the use of Hanyu Pinyin while the Democratic Progressive Party (DPP) and its allies in the Pan-Green Coalition favored the use of Tongyong Pinyin.

Today, many street signs in Taiwan use Tongyong Pinyin or derived romanizations, but some use Hanyu Pinyin–derived romanizations. It is not unusual to see spellings on street signs and buildings derived from the older Wade–Giles, MPS2 and other systems. Attempts to make Hanyu Pinyin standard in Taiwan have had uneven success, with most place and proper names remaining unaffected, including all major cities. Personal names on Taiwanese passports honor the choices of Taiwanese citizens, who can choose Wade–Giles, Hakka, Hoklo, Tongyong, aboriginal, or pinyin. Official use of pinyin is controversial, as when pinyin use for a metro line in 2017 provoked protests, despite government responses that "The romanization used on road signs and at transportation stations is intended for foreigners ... Every foreigner learning Mandarin learns Hanyu pinyin, because it is the international standard ... The decision has nothing to do with the nation's self-determination or any ideologies, because the key point is to ensure that foreigners can read signs."

==== Singapore ====
Singapore implemented Hanyu Pinyin as the official romanization system for Mandarin in the public sector starting in the 1980s, in conjunction with the Speak Mandarin Campaign. Hanyu Pinyin is also used as the romanization system to teach Mandarin Chinese at schools. While adoption has been mostly successful in government communication, placenames, and businesses established in the 1980s and onward, it continues to be unpopular in some areas, most notably for personal names and vocabulary borrowed from other varieties of Chinese already established in the local vernacular. In these situations, romanization continues to be based on the Chinese language variety it originated from, especially the three largest Chinese varieties traditionally spoken in Singapore: Hokkien, Teochew, and Cantonese.

=== Special names ===
In accordance to the Regulation of Phonetic Transcription in Hanyu Pinyin Letters of Place Names in Minority Nationality Languages (少数民族语地名汉语拼音字母音译转写法; 少數民族語地名漢語拼音字母音譯寫法) promulgated in 1976, place names in non-Han languages like Mongolian, Uyghur, and Tibetan are also officially transcribed using pinyin in a system adopted by the State Administration of Surveying and Mapping and Geographical Names Committee known as SASM/GNC romanization. The pinyin letters (26 Roman letters, plus ⟨ü⟩ and ⟨ê⟩) are used to approximate the non-Han language in question as closely as possible. This results in spellings that are different from both the customary spelling of the place name, and the pinyin spelling of the name in Chinese:

Customary	Official pinyin	Characters
Shigatse	Xigazê	日喀则; 日喀則; Rìkāzé
Urumchi	Ürümqi	乌鲁木齐; 烏魯木齊; Wūlǔmùqí
Lhasa	Lhasa	拉萨; 拉薩; Lāsà
Hohhot	Hohhot	呼和浩特; Hūhéhàotè
Golmud	Golmud	格尔木; 格爾木; Gé'ěrmù
Qiqihar	Qiqihar	齐齐哈尔; 齊齊哈爾; Qíqíhā'ěr

== See also ==
- Chinese word-segmented writing
- Combining character
- Comparison of Chinese transcription systems
- Cyrillization of Chinese
- Jyutping
- Pinyin table
- Romanization of Japanese
- Transcription into Chinese characters
- Two-cell Chinese Braille
