= PEN/Heim Translation Fund Grants =

Grant for literary translation

- Country: (United States) (Administered in the U.S.)
- Presented by: PEN America
- Formerly called: PEN Translation Fund Grants
- Established: 2003

The PEN/Heim Translation Fund Grants were established in 2003 by PEN America (formerly PEN American Center) following a gift of $730,000 by Michael Henry Heim, a noted literary translator. Heim believed that there was a "dismayingly low number of literary translations currently appearing in English". The grants' purpose is to promote the publication and reception of translated world literature in English. Grants are awarded each year to a select number of literary translators based on quality of translation as well as the originality and importance of the original work. The Fund's mission is to promote the publication and reception of world literature.

Since the first grants were awarded in 2004, the Fund has supported translations of books from more than 30 languages.

Many works supported by the Fund are eventually published, and a significant number have won or been shortlisted for major literary awards, including the Best Translated Book Award, the Northern California Book Award for Translation, the R. R. Hawkins Award for Outstanding Professional, Reference or Scholarly Book, the National Jewish Book Award for Poetry, National Book Critics Circle Award for Poetry, the Helen and Kurt Wolff Translator's Prize, and Griffin Poetry Prize. Others have received additional support from the Lannan Foundation, or been named one of the New York Public Library's annual list of 25 Books to Remember.

Previously known as the PEN Translation Fund Grants, the awards were renamed in honor of Heim, who insisted on complete anonymity, after his death in 2012.

== List of recipients ==
=== 2004 ===
The names of ten winners were announced. The voting members of the advisory board were Esther Allen, Sara Bershtel, Barbara Epler, Michael Henry Heim, and Eliot Weinberger.

Translator	Title	Original title	Author	Language	Publisher
Andrea Berger	Bestiarium Transylvaniae I: The Birds of the Air	Bestiarium Transylvaniae I: Az ég madarai	(Hungary) Zsolt Láng	Hungarian	
Philip Boehm	Settlement	Landnahme	(Germany) Christoph Hein	German	Metropolitan Books
Peter Cole	The Dream of the Poem: Hebrew Poetry from Muslim and Christian Spain, 950–1492	—N/a	—N/a	Hebrew	Princeton University Press
Kent Johnson and Forrest Gander	The Night	La noche	(Bolivia) Jaime Sáenz	Spanish	Princeton University Press
Idra Novey	The Clean Shirt of It	—N/a	(Brazil) Paulo Henriques Britto	Portuguese	BOA Editions
Joonseong (Jason) Park	Diary of a Vagabond	—N/a	(South Korea) Song Yong	Korean	Codhill Press
Kristin Prevallet	The Other World: Unpublished Writings	L'autre monde: Écrits inédits	(Republic of the Congo) Sony Lab'ou Tansi	French	
Timothy Sergay	A Gloom Descends Upon the Ancient Steps	Ложится мгла на старые ступени	(Russia) Aleksandr Chudakov	Russian	
Gerald Turner	Europeana: A Brief History of the Twentieth Century	Europeana: Stručné dějiny dvacátého věku	(Czech Republic) Patrik Ouředník	Czech	Dalkey Archive Press
Elizabeth Winslow	The War Works Hard	الحرب تعمل بجد	(Iraq) Dunya Mikhail	Arabic	New Directions Publishing

=== 2005 ===
The names of thirteen winners were announced. The voting members of the advisory board were Esther Allen, Sara Bershtel, Barbara Epler, Michael Henry Heim, and Eliot Weinberger.

Translator	Title	Original title	Author	Language	Publisher
Chris Andrews	Last Evenings on Earth	Llamadas telefónicas	(Chile) Roberto Bolaño	Spanish	New Directions Publishing
Rachel Tzvia Back	Selected Poetry and Drama	—N/a	(Israel) Leah Goldberg	Hebrew	The Toby Press
Susan Bernofsky	The Old Child and Other Stories	Geschichte vom alten Kind	(Germany) Jenny Erpenbeck	German	New Directions Publishing
Heather Cleary	The Persuasion of Days	Persuasión de los días	(Argentina) Oliverio Girondo	Spanish	New Directions Publishing
Karen Emmerich	Poems (1945-1971)	Ποιήματα (1945-1971)	(Greece) Miltos Sachtouris	Greek	Archipelago Books
Jason Grunebaum	The Girl with the Golden Parasol	पीली छतरी वाली लड़की	(India) Uday Prakash	Hindi	Yale University Press
Deborah Hoffman	The Littlest Enemies: Children in the Shadow of the Gulag	Дети ГУЛАГа	(Russia) Semyon Vilensky (editor)	Russian	Slavica Publishers
Elizabeth Macklin	Meanwhile Take My Hand	Bitartean heldu eskutik	(Spain) Kirmen Uribe	Basque	Graywolf Press
Susanna Nied	Butterfly Valley: A Requiem	Sommerfugledalen: Et requiem	(Denmark) Inger Christensen	Danish	New Directions Publishing
Laima Sruoginis	My Voice Betrays Me	Išsiduosi. Balsu	(Lithuania) Vanda Juknaitė	Lithuanian	East European Monographs
George Szirtes	War and War	Háború és háború	(Hungary) László Krasznahorkai	Hungarian	New Directions Publishing
Paul Vincent	Summer in Termuren	Zomer te Ter-Muren	(Belgium) Louis Paul Boon	Dutch	Dalkey Archive Press
Susan Wilf	Confessions: An Innocent Life in Communist China	我的反动自述	(China) (United States) Kang Zhengguo	Chinese	W. W. Norton & Company

=== 2006 ===
The names of nine winners were announced. The voting members of the advisory board were Esther Allen, Sara Bershtel, Barbara Epler, Michael Henry Heim, Michael F. Moore, Richard Sieburth, and Eliot Weinberger.

Translator	Title	Original title	Author	Language	Publisher
Chris Andrews	Collected Poems	—N/a	(Finland) Henry Parland	Swedish	Ugly Duckling
Victoria Haggblom	To Mervas	Till Mervas	(Sweden) Elisabeth Rynell	Swedish	Archipelago Books
Nicky Harman	Banished!	扎根	(China) Han Dong	Chinese	University of Hawaii Press
Ann L. Huss	Beauty	人面桃花	(China) Ge Fei	Chinese	
Sawako Nakayasu	For the Fighting Spirit of the Walnut	胡桃の戦意のために	(Japan) Takashi Hiraide	Japanese	New Directions Publishing
Tegan Raleigh	The Tongue's Blood Does Not Run Dry: Algerian Stories	Oran, langue morte	(Algeria) Assia Djebar	French	Seven Stories Press
Constantine Rusanov	The Junction	—N/a	(Lithuania) Tomas Venclova	Lithuanian	Bloodaxe
Stepan S. Simek	Theremin	Teremin	(Czech Republic) Petr Zelenka	Czech	
Stepan S. Simek	3sisters2002.cz	3sestry2002.cz	(Czech Republic) Iva Volánková	Czech	
Alan Trei and Inna Feldbach	Truth and Justice I: Robber’s Rise	Tõde ja õigus I	(Estonia) A. H. Tammsaare	Estonian	

=== 2007 ===
The names of ten winners were announced. The voting members of the advisory board were Esther Allen, Sara Bershtel, Barbara Epler, Michael Henry Heim, Michael F. Moore, Richard Sieburth, and Eliot Weinberger.

Translator	Title	Original title	Author	Language	Publisher
Susan Bernofsky	The Assistant	Der Gehülfe	(Switzerland) Robert Walser	German	New Directions Publishing
Jennifer Hayashida	Clockwork and Flowers: Explanations and Poems	—N/a	(Sweden) Fredrik Nyberg	Swedish	
Wen Huang	The Woman from Shanghai	告别夹边沟	(China) Yang Xianhui	Chinese	Pantheon
Ha-yun Jung	A Lone Room	외딴방	(South Korea) Shin Kyung-sook	Korean	Pegasus Books
Sara Khalili	Seasons of Purgatory	—N/a	(Iran) Shahriar Mandanipour	Persian	Bellevue Literary Press
Paul Olchváry	The Ninth	A kilencedik	(Hungary) Ferenc Barnás	Hungarian	Northwestern University Press
Red Pine	In Such Hard Times	—N/a	Wei Yingwu	Chinese	Copper Canyon Press
Katherine Silver	Senselessness	Insensatez	(El Salvador) Horacio Castellanos Moya	Spanish	New Directions Publishing
Christopher Southward	Acacia	—N/a	(Japan) Hitonari Tsuji	Japanese	The Brooklyn Rail (excerpt)
Alyson Waters	A Splendid Conspiracy	Un complot de saltimbanques	(France) Albert Cossery	French	New Directions Publishing

=== 2008 ===
The names of eight winners were announced. The voting members of the advisory board were Sara Bershtel, Edwin Frank, Michael Henry Heim, Michael F. Moore, Richard Sieburth and Jeffrey Yang, and Esther Allen served as the non-voting Chair.

Translator	Title	Original title	Author	Language	Publisher
Bernard Adams	Kornél Esti		(Hungary) Dezső Kosztolányi	Hungarian	New Directions Publishing
Jeffrey Angles	Twelve Views from the Distance	十二の遠景	(Japan) Mutsuo Takahashi	Japanese	University of Minnesota Press
Andrea Lingenfelter	Padma	莲花	(China) Anni Baobei	Chinese	
Jessica Moore	Turkana Boy		(Canada) Jean-François Beauchemin	French	Talonbooks
Sean Redmond	Another Holy Land: Felix Fabri’s Voyage to Medieval Egypt	Fratris Felicis Fabri Evagatorium in Terræ Sanctæ, Arabiæ et Egypti Peregrinationem	(Old Swiss Confederacy) Felix Fabri	Latin	American University in Cairo Press
Mira Rosenthal	Colonies	Kolonie	(Poland) Tomasz Różycki	Polish	Zephyr Press
Damion Searls	Amsterdam Stories	—N/a	(Netherlands) Nescio	Dutch	New York Review Books
Simon Wickham-Smith	The Battle for Our Land Has Begun	—N/a	(Mongolia) Ochirbatyn Dashbalbar	Mongolian	Dashbalbar Foundation

=== 2009 ===
The names of eleven winners were announced. The voting members of the advisory board were Sara Bershtel, Edwin Frank, Michael Henry Heim, Michael F. Moore, Richard Sieburth, and Jeffrey Yang, and Esther Allen served as the non-voting Chair.

Translator	Title	Original title	Author	Language	Publisher
Eric Abrahamsen	My Spiritual Homeland	我的精神家园	(China) Wang Xiaobo	Chinese	
Mee Chang	Garden of Youth	유년의 뚤	(South Korea) Oh Jung-hee	Korean	
Robyn Creswell	The Clash of Images	La querelle des images	(Morocco) Abdelfattah Kilito	French	New Directions Publishing
Brett Foster	Elemental Rebel: The Rime of Cecco Angiolieri	—N/a	(Italy) Cecco Angiolieri	Italian	Able Muse (excerpt)
G.M. Goshgarian	The Remnants	Մնացորդաց	(Ottoman Empire) (Armenia) Hagop Oshagan	Armenian	Gomidas Institute
Tess Lewis	Maybe This Time	Die Kinder beruhigte das nicht	(Austria) Alois Hotschnig	German	Peirene Press
Fayre Makeig	Mourning	—N/a	(Pahlavi dynasty) Hushang Ebtehaj	Persian	
Arvind Krishna Mehrotra	Songs of Kabir	—N/a	(India) Kabir	Hindi	New York Review Books
Frederika Randall	Deliver Us from Evil	Libera nos a malo	(Italy) Luigi Meneghello	Italian	Northwestern University Press
Daniel Shapiro	Missing Persons, Animals and Artists	Desaparecidos, animales y artistas	(Mexico) Roberto Ransom	Spanish	Swan Isle Press
Chantal Wright	A Hand Full of Water	Eine Hand voll Wasser	(Germany) (Bulgaria) Tzveta Sofronieva	German	White Pine Press

=== 2010 ===
The names of eleven winners were announced. The voting members of the advisory board were Esther Allen, David Bellos, Susan Bernofsky, Edwin Frank, Michael F. Moore, and Jeffrey Yang.

Translator	Title	Original title	Author	Language	Publisher
Daniel Brunet	The Last Fire	Das letzte Feuer	(Germany) Dea Loher	German	
Alexander Dawe	Short Stories	—N/a	(Turkey) Ahmet Hamdi Tanpınar	Turkish	
Peter Golub	Or Tea? The Selected Short Fiction of Linor Goralik	—N/a	(Israel) Linor Goralik	Russian	
Piotr Gwiazda	Kopenhaga	—N/a	(Poland) Grzegorz Wróblewski	Polish	Zephyr Press
David Hull	Waverings	動搖	(China) Mao Dun	Chinese	Chinese University of Hong Kong Press
Akinloye A. Ojo	Afaimo and Other Poems	—N/a	(Nigeria) Akinwunmi Isola	Yoruba	
Angela Rodel	Holy Light	Свещена светлина	(Bulgaria) Georgi Tenev	Bulgarian	
Margo Rosen	Poetry and Untruth	Поэзия и неправда	(Russia) Anatoly Naiman	Russian	
Chip Rossetti	Animals in Our Days	حيوانات أيامنا	(Egypt) Mohamed Makhzangi	Arabic	Words Without Borders (excerpt)
Bilal Tanweer	Love in Chakiwara and Other Misadventures	چاکیواڑہ میں وصال	(Pakistan) Mohammad Khalid Akhtar	Urdu	Pan Macmillan India
Diane Thiel	The Great Green	Η μεγάλη πράσινη	(Greece) Evgenia Fakinou	Greek	

=== 2011 ===
The names of eleven winners were announced. The voting members of the advisory board were David Bellos, Susan Bernofsky, Edwin Frank, Michael Reynolds, Natasha Wimmer, and Jeffrey Yang, and Michael F. Moore served as the non-voting Chair.

Translator	Title	Original title	Author	Language	Publisher
Amiri Ayanna	The St. Katharinental Sister Book: Lives of the Sisters of the Dominican Convent at Diessenhofen	Lebensbeschreibung viler in allhiessigem gottshauss heylig-mässig gelebter closter-jungfrawen	—N/a	German	Asymptote (excerpt)
Neil Blackadder	The Test (Good Simon Korach)	Die Probe (Der brave Simon Korach)	(Switzerland) Lukas Bärfuss	German	
Clarissa Botsford	Sworn Virgin	Vergine giurata	(Albania) (Switzerland) Elvira Dones	Italian	And Other Stories
Steve Bradbury	Salsa		(Taiwan) Hsia Yü	Chinese	Zephyr Press
Annmarie S. Drury	Stray Truths: Selected Poems of Euphrase Kezilahabi	—N/a	(Tanzania) Euphrase Kezilahabi	Swahili	Michigan State University Press
Diane Nemec Ignashev	Paranoia	Паранойя	(Belarus) Victor Martinovich	Russian	Northwestern University Press
Chenxin Jiang	Memories of the Cowshed	牛棚杂忆	(China) Ji Xianlin	Chinese	New York Review Books
Hilary B. Kaplan	Rilke Shake		(Brazil) Angélica Freitas	Portuguese	Phoneme
Catherine Schelbert	Flametti, or The Dandyism of the Poor	Flametti, oder Vom Dandysmus der Armen	(Germany) Hugo Ball	German	Wakefield Press
Joel Streicker	Birds in the Mouth	Pájaros en la boca	(Argentina) Samanta Schweblin	Spanish	Wakefield Press
Sarah L. Thomas	Turnaround	Cambio de sentido	(Spain) Mar Gómez Glez	Spanish	Words Without Borders (excerpt)

=== 2012 ===
The names of thirteen winners were announced. The voting members of the advisory board were Susan Bernofsky, Barbara Epler, Edwin Frank, Michael Reynolds, Richard Sieburth, Eliot Weinberger, and Natasha Wimmer, and Michael F. Moore served as the non-voting Chair.

Translator	Title	Original title	Author	Language	Publisher
Bernard Adams	The Hangman’s House	A hóhér háza	(Hungary) (Romania) Andrea Tompa	Hungarian	
Alexander Booth	in latin fields	im delderlatein	(Germany) Lutz Seiler	German	
Brent Edwards	Phantom Africa	L’Afrique fantôme	(France) Michel Leiris	French	Seagull Books
Joshua Daniel Edwin	gloomerang	kummerang	(Germany) Dagmara Kraus	German	
Musharraf Ali Farooqi	Hoshruba: The Prisoner of Batin	طلسمِ ہو شربا	(India) Muhammad Husain Jah and Ahmed Husain Qamar	Urdu	Random House India
Deborah Garfinkle	Worm-Eaten Time: Poems from a Life Under Normalization	—N/a	(Czech Republic) Pavel Šrut	Czech	
Hillary Gulley	The End of the Same	El fin de lo mismo	(Argentina) Marcelo Cohen	Spanish	
Bonnie Huie	Notes of a Crocodile	鱷魚手記	(Taiwan) Qiu Miaojin	Chinese	New York Review Books
Jacquelyn Pope	Hungerpots	—N/a	(Netherlands) Hester Knibbe	Dutch	
Matt Reeck and Aftab Ahmad	Mirages of the Mind	آبِ گم	(Pakistan) Mushtaq Ahmad Yusufi	Urdu	
Carrie Reed	Miscellaneous Morsels from Youyang	酉陽雜俎	Duan Chengshi	Chinese	
Nathanaël	The Mausoleum of Lovers	Le Mausolée des amants	(France) Hervé Guibert	French	Nightboat Books

Nomination for the NYSCA grant:

Translator	Title	Original title	Author	Language	Publisher
Ana Božičević	It Was Easy to Set the Snow on Fire	—N/a	(Serbia) Zvonko Karanović	Serbian	Phoneme Media

=== 2013 ===
The names of thirteen winners were announced. The voting members of the advisory board were Susan Bernofsky, Barbara Epler, Richard Sieburth, Lauren Wein, Eliot Weinberger, Natasha Wimmer, and Matvei Yankelvich, and Michael F. Moore served as the non-voting Chair.

Translator	Title	Original title	Author	Language	Publisher
Daniel Borzutzky	The Country of Planks	El País de Tablas	(Chile) Raúl Zurita	Spanish	Action Books
Isabel Cole	At the Burning Abyss: Experiencing the Georg Trakl Poem	Vor Feuerschlünden: Erfahrung mit Georg Trakls Gedicht	(Germany) Franz Fühmann	German	Seagull Books
Sean Cotter	Rakes of the Old Court	Craii de Curtea-Veche	(Romania) Mateiu Caragiale	Romanian	
Chloe Garcia Roberts	Derangements of My Contemporaries: Miscellaneous Notes	雜纂	Li Shangyin	Chinese	New Directions Publishing
Edward Gauvin	The Conductor and Other Tales	Le mécanicien et autres contes	(France) Jean Ferry	French	Wakefield Press
Eleanor Goodman	Something Crosses My Mind	有什么在我心里一过	(China) Wang Xiaoni	Chinese	Zephyr Press
Marilyn Hacker	The Bridges of Budapest	—N/a	(France) Jean-Paul de Dadelsen	French	
Elizabeth Harris	Tristano Dies	Tristano muore	(Italy) Antonio Tabucchi	Italian	Archipelago Books
Jennifer Hayashida	White Blight	Vitsvit	(Iran) (Sweden) Athena Farrokhzad	Swedish	Argos Books
Eugene Ostashevsky and Daniel Mellis	Tango with Cows	Танго с коровами	(Russia) Vasily Kamensky	Russian	
Jeremy Tiang	Ninth Building	九栋	(China) Zou Jingzhi	Chinese	
Annie Tucker	Beauty Is a Wound	Cantik Itu Luka	(Indonesia) Eka Kurniawan	Indonesian	New Directions
Lara Vergnaud	France, Story of a Childhood	France, récit d’une enfance	(France) (Algeria) Zahia Rahmani	French	Yale University Press

Nomination for the NYSCA grant:

Translator	Title	Original title	Author	Language	Publisher
Iza Wojciechowska	The Dye Girl	Farbiarka	(Poland) Anna Piwkowska	Polish	

=== 2014 ===
The names of fifteen winners were announced. The voting members of the advisory board were Esther Allen, Barbara Epler, Sara Khalili, Michael F. Moore, Lauren Wein, and Lorin Stein.

Translator	Title	Original title	Author	Language	Publisher
Kurt Beals	The Country Road	Die Landstrasse	(Switzerland) Regina Ullmann	German	New Directions Publishing
Eric M. B. Becker	Sea Loves Me: Selected Stories	—N/a	(Mozambique) Mia Couto	Portuguese	New Directions Publishing
David Burnett	The American Stories	—N/a	(Czech Republic) (United States) Johannes Urzidil	German	New Directions Publishing
Janet Hong	The Impossible Fairy Tale	불가능한 동화	(South Korea) Han Yujoo	Korean	Graywolf Press
Paul Hoover	Nightmare Running on a Meadow of Absolute Light	Yegua nocturna corriendo en un prado de luz absoluta	(Mexico) María Baranda	Spanish	Shearsman Books
Andrea G. Labinger	Gesell Dome	Cámara Gesell	(Argentina) Guillermo Saccomanno	Spanish	Open Letter
Sergey Levchin	Commentaries	Commentaires	(France) Chris Marker	French	
Zachary Ludington	Pixel Flesh	Carne de píxel	(Spain) Agustín Fernández Mallo	Spanish	
J. Bret Maney	Manhattan Tropics	Trópico en Manhattan	(United States) (Puerto Rico) Guillermo Cotto-Thorner	Spanish	
Philip Metres and Dimitri Psurtsev	I Burned at the Feast	—N/a	(Russia) (Ukraine) Arseny Tarkovsky	Russian	Cleveland State University Poetry Center
Sayuri Okamoto	Dear Monster: the Naked Poetry of Gozo Yoshimasu	—N/a	(Japan) Gōzō Yoshimasu	Japanese	
Benjamin Paloff	The Game for Real	Hra doopravdy	(Czech Republic) Richard Weiner	Czech	Two Lines Press
Miranda Richmond Mouillot	The Kites	Les cerfs-volants	(France) Romain Gary	French	New Directions Publishing
Thom Satterlee	New and Selected Poetry of Per Aage Brandt	—N/a	(Denmark) Per Aage Brandt	Danish	Open Letter
Sholeh Wolpé	The Conference of the Birds	منطق‌الطیر	(Iran) Farid ud-Din Attar	Persian	W. W. Norton & Company

Nominations for the NYSCA grant:

Translator	Title	Original title	Author	Language	Publisher
Edna McCown	Shanghai, Far from Where	Shanghai fern von wo	(Germany) Ursula Krechel	German	
Yvette Siegert	Diana's Tree	Árbol de Diana	(Argentina) Alejandra Pizarnik	Spanish	Ugly Duckling Presse

=== 2015 ===
The names of sixteen winners were announced. The voting members of the advisory board were Esther Allen, Mitzi Angel, Peter Blackstock, Howard Goldblatt, Sara Khalili, Michael F. Moore, Declan Spring, and Alex Zucker.

Translator	Title	Original title	Author	Language	Publisher
Allison M. Charette	Beyond the Rice Fields	Au-delà des rizières	(Madagascar) Naivo	French	Restless Books
Jennifer Croft	The Books of Jacob	Księgi Jakubowe	(Poland) Olga Tokarczuk	Polish	Biblioasis
Stephan Delbos and Tereza Novická	The Absolute Gravedigger	Absolutní hrobař	(Czech Republic) Vítězslav Nezval	Czech	Twisted Spoon Press
Amanda DeMarco	New Inventions and the Latest Innovations	Inventions nouvelles et dernières nouveautés	(France) Gaston de Pawlowski	French	Wakefield Press
Adriana X. Jacobs	The Truffle Eye	עין הכמהין	(Israel) Vaan Nguyen	Hebrew	Zephyr Press
Roy Kesey	The Cousins	Las primas	(Argentina) Aurora Venturini	Spanish	
Lee Klein	Revulsion: Thomas Bernhard in San Salvador	El asco: Thomas Bernhard en San Salvador	(El Salvador) Horacio Castellanos Moya	Spanish	New Directions Publishing
Dong Li	The Gleaner Song	—N/a	(China) Song Lin	Chinese	
Meg Matich	Cold Moons	Tími kaldra mána	(Iceland) Magnús Sigurðsson	Icelandic	Phoneme Media
Jacob Moe	On My Aunt's Shallow Grave White Roses Have Already Bloomed	—N/a	(Greece) Maria Mitsora	Greek	Yale University Press
Rajiv Mohabir	I Even Regret Night: Holi Songs of Demerara	—N/a	(India) Lalbihari Sharma	Bhojpuri	Kaya Press
Takami Nieda	Go		(South Korea) (Japan) Kazuki Kaneshiro	Japanese	Amazon Crossing
Zoë Perry	Opisanie świata		(Brazil) Veronica Stigger	Portuguese	
Will Schutt	My Life, I Lapped It Up	—N/a	(Italy) Edoardo Sanguineti	Italian	Oberlin College Press
Sophie Seita	Subsisters: Selected Poems	—N/a	(Germany) Uljana Wolf	German	Belladonna
Simon Wickhamsmith	The End of the Dark Era	—N/a	(Mongolia) Tseveendorjin Oidov	Mongolian	Phoneme Media

=== 2016 ===
The names of fourteen winners were announced. The voting members of the advisory board were Esther Allen, Peter Blackstock, Sara Khalili, Tynan Kogane, Allison Markin Powell, Antonio Romani, Chip Rossetti, and Alex Zucker. Each winner was given $3,670.00.

Translator	Title	Original title	Author	Language	Publisher
Gabriel Amor	Juana I		(Argentina) Ana Azourmanian	Spanish	
Ellen Cassedy	On the Landing: Stories by Yenta Mash	—N/a	(Moldova) (Israel) Yenta Mash	Yiddish	Northern Illinois University Press
Chris Clarke	Imaginary Lives	Vies imaginaires	(France) Marcel Schwob	French	Wakefield Press
Sharon Dolin	Book of Minutes	Llibre dels minuts	(Spain) Gemma Gorga	Catalan	Oberlin College Press
Kaiama L. Glover	Hadriana in All My Dreams	Hadriana dans tous mes rêves	(Haiti) (France) René Depestre	French	Akashic Books
Anita Gopalan	Simsim	सिमसिम	(India) Geet Chaturvedi	Hindi	Penguin Books
Amanda Lee Koe	Ten Years of Marriage	结婚十年	(China) Su Qing	Chinese	
Karen Leeder	Thick of It	Dickicht	(Germany) Ulrike Almut Sandig	German	Seagull Books
Rachel McNicholl	Operation Hinterland: Tales from the Silver Scrapheap	Der Zwerg reinigt den Kittel	(Austria) Anita Augustin	German	
Alicia Maria Meier	The Sky According to Google	El cel segons Google	(Spain) Marta Carnicero Hernanz	Catalan	
Emma Ramadan	The Shutters	Les persiennes	(Morocco) Ahmed Bouanani	French	New Directions Publishing
Corine Tachtiris	Dark Love	Temná láska	(Czech Republic) Alexandra Berková	Czech	
Russell Scott Valentino	Kin	Rod	(Bosnia and Herzegovina) Miljenko Jergović	Croatian	Archipelago Books
Jeffrey Zuckerman	Written in Invisible Ink: Selected Stories	—N/a	(France) Hervé Guibert	French	Semiotext(e)

=== 2017 ===
The names of fifteen winners were announced. The voting members of the advisory board were Tyan Kogane, Edna McCrown, Fiona McCrae, Canaan Morse, Idra Novey, Allison Markin Powell, Antonio Romani, Chip Rossetti, Shabnam Nadiya, and Ross Ufberg.

Translator	Title	Original title	Author	Language	Publisher
Nick Admussen	Floral Mutter	花的低语	(China) Ya Shi	Chinese	Zephyr Press
Polly Barton	So We Look to the Sky	ふがいない僕は空を見た	(Japan) Misumi Kubo	Japanese	Arcade Publishing
Elizabeth Bryer	The Palimpsests	Los palimpsestos	(Spain) (Poland) Aleksandra Lun	Spanish	Verba Mundi
Vitaly Chernetsky	Felix Austria	Фелікс Австрія	(Ukraine) Sofia Andrukhovych	Ukrainian	
Iain Galbraith	Raoul Schrott: Selected Poems	—N/a	(Austria) Raoul Schrott	German	
Michelle Gil-Montero	Edinburgh Notebook		(Mexico) Valerie Mejer Caso	Spanish	Action Books
Sophie Hughes	The Remainder	La resta	(Chile) Alia Trabucco Zerán	Spanish	And Other Stories
Elisabeth Jaquette	Thirteen Months of Sunrises	شهرًا من شروق الشمس 13	(Sudan) Rania Mamoun	Arabic	Comma Press
Kira Josefsson	The Arab	Araben	(Sweden) Pooneh Rohi	Swedish	
Adam Morris	I Didn’t Talk	Não Falei	(Brazil) Beatriz Bracher	Portuguese	New Directions Publishing
Kaitlin Rees	A Parade	—N/a	(Vietnam) Nhã Thuyên	Vietnamese	Sand (excerpt)
Dayla Rogers	Wûf	Haw	(Turkey) Kemal Varol	Turkish	Center for Middle Eastern Studies UT-Austin
Christopher Tamigi	In Your Name	A nome tuo	(Italy) Mauro Covacich	Italian	
Manjushree Thapa	There’s a Carnival Today	आज रमिता छ	(India) Indra Bahadur Rai	Nepali	Speaking Tiger Books
Joyce Zonana	This Land That Is Like You	Ce pays qui te ressemble	(France) (Egypt) Tobie Nathan	French	

=== 2018 ===
The names of twelve winners were announced. The voting members of the advisory board were John Balcom, Peter Constantine, Tynan Kogane, Allison Markin Powell, Fiona McCrae, Mary Ann Newman, Antonio Romani, Chip Rossetti, Ross Ufberg, Natasha Wimmer, and Board Chair Samantha Schnee.

Translator	Title	Original title	Author	Language	Publisher
Janine Beichman	The Essential Yosano Akiko: The Ripening Years	—N/a	(Japan) Yosano Akiko	Japanese	
Alexander Dickow	The Neverending Quest for the Other Shore: An Epic in Three Cantos	La quête infinie de l’autre rive: Épopée en trois chants	(France) Sylvie Kandé	French	Wesleyan University Press
Emily Drumsta	Revolt Against the Sun	—N/a	(Iraq) Nazik al-Malaika	Arabic	Saqi Books
Lindy Falk van Rooye	Hope	Haabet	(Denmark) Mich Vraa	Danish	
Bruce Fulton and Ju-Chan Fulton	One Left	한명	(South Korea) Kim Sum	Korean	University of Washington Press
Michael Gluck	Matisse	Матисс	(Russia) Alexander Ilichevsky	Russian	
Mariam Rahmani	In Case of Emergency	نگران نباش	(Iran) Mahsa Mohebali	Persian	The Feminist Press
Aaron Robertson	Beyond Babylon	Oltre Babilonia	(Italy) Igiaba Scego	Italian	Two Lines Press
Julia Sanchez	Slash and Burn	Roza, tumba, quema	(El Salvador) Claudia Hernández	Spanish	And Other Stories
Jamie Lee Searle	Winter’s Garden	Winters Garten	(Austria) Valerie Fritsch	German	
Brian Sneeden	Rhapsodia	Ραψωδία	(Greece) Phoebe Giannisi	Greek	
Ri J. Turner	Chaim Gravitzer (The Tale of the Downfallen One): From the World of Chabad	חיים גראַװיצער (די געשיכטע פֿון דעם געפֿאַלענעם): פֿון דער חבדישער װעלט	(Israel) (Ukraine) Fishl Schneersohn	Yiddish	In geveb (excerpt)
Jeanne Bonner	A Walk in the Shadows	Passaggio in ombra	(Italy) Mariateresa Di Lascia	Italian	

=== 2019 ===
Translator	Title	Original title	Author	Language	Publisher
Bruna Dantas Lobato	Moldy Strawberries	Morangos mofados	(Brazil) Caio Fernando Abreu	Portuguese	Archipelago Books
Stephen Epstein	The Wandering: Choose Your Own Red Shoes Adventure	Gentayangan: Pilih Sendiri Petualangan Sepatu Merahmu	(Indonesia) Intan Paramaditha	Indonesian	Harvill Secker
Misha Hoekstra	New Passengers	Nye rejsende	(Denmark) Tine Høeg	Danish	Lolli Editions
Lucas Klein	Words as Grain: New and Selected Poems	—N/a	(China) Duo Duo	Chinese	Yale University Press
Simon Leser	Tomorrow They Won't Dare to Murder Us	De nos frères blessés	(France) Joseph Andras	French	Verso Books
Emma Lloyd	Of Pearls and Scars	De perlas y cicatrices	(Chile) Pedro Lemebel	Spanish	
Ottilie Mulzet	Swedish	Svéd	(Hungary) Gábor Schein	Hungarian	
Catherine Nelson	Tea Rooms: Working Women	Tea Rooms: Mujeres obreras	(Spain) Luisa Carnés	Spanish	
Julia Powers	Selected Poems	—N/a	(Brazil) Hilda Hilst	Portuguese	
Lara Vergnaud	The Ardent Swarm	L’amas ardent	(Tunisia) Yamen Manai	French	Amazon Crossing
Hope Campbell Gustafson	The Commander of the River	Il comandante del fiume	(Italy) (Somalia) Cristina Ali Farah	Italian	Indiana University Press

=== 2020 ===
Winners in 2020 were:

Translator	Title	Original title	Author	Language	Publisher
Curtis Bauer	Home Reading Service	El lector a domicilio	(Mexico) (Italy) Fabio Morábito	Spanish	Other Press
Fiona Bell	Stories of a Life	Рассказы	(Russia) Natalia Meshchaninova	Russian	Deep Vellum Publishing
Kevin Gerry Dunn	Easy Reading	Lectura fácil	(Spain) Cristina Morales	Spanish	Jonathan Cape
Dawn Fulton	Cajou		(France) Michèle Lacrosil	French	
Anton Hur	Cursed Bunny	저주 토끼	(South Korea) Bora Chung	Korean	Honford Star
Yarri Kamara	So Distant from My Life	Si loin de ma vie	(Burkina Faso) Monique Ilboudo	French	Tilted Axis Press
Johnny Lorenz	Notebook of Return	Caderno de retorno	(Brazil) Edimilson de Almeida Pereira	Portuguese	
Shabnam Nadiya	The Meat Market: Ten Stories and a Novella	মাংসের কারবার	(Bangladesh) Mashiul Alam	Bengali	Eka/Westland
Quyên Nguyễn-Hoàng	Chronicles of a Village	Những Tin Tức Về Một Ngôi Làng	(Vietnam) Nguyễn Thanh Hiên	Vietnamese	Penguin Random House SEA; Yale University Press
Jacob Rogers	Extraordinary	Extraordinario	(Spain) Antón Lopo	Galician	
Minna Zallman Proctor	The Renegade: Natalia Ginzburg, Her Life and Writing	La corsara: Ritratto di Natalia Ginzburg	(Italy) Sandra Petrignani	Italian	

=== 2021 ===
10 grants were made in 2021:

Translator	Title	Original title	Author	Language	Publisher
Natascha Bruce	Owlish	鷹頭貓與音樂箱女孩	(Hong Kong) Dorothy Tse	Chinese	Graywolf Press
Rohan Chhetri	The Dust Draws Its Face on the Wind	—N/a	(Nepal) (India) Avinash Shrestha	Nepali	HarperCollins
Rachael Daum	Lusitania	Лузитанија	(Serbia) Dejan Atanacković	Serbian	
Katharine Halls	Things That Can't Be Fixed	ما لا يمكن إصلاحه	(Egypt) Haytham el-Wardany	Arabic	
Banibrata Mahanta	Lavanyadevi	लावण्यदेवी	(India) Kusum Khemani	Hindi	Orient Blackswan
Adrian Minckley	The Whore	A Puta	(Brazil) Márcia Barbieri	Portuguese	Sublunary Editions
Lara Norgaard	24 Hours with Gaspar	24 Jam Bersama Gaspar	(Indonesia) Sabda Armandio	Indonesian	Seagull Books
Ekaterina Yosifova	Traveling in the Direction of the Shadow	Пътуване по посока на сянката	(Bulgaria) Iana Boukova	Bulgarian	
Jake Syersak	I, Caustic	Moi, l’aigre	(Morocco) Mohammed Khaïr-Eddine	French	Litmus Press
Vala Thorodds	Swanfolk	Svanafólkið	(Iceland) Kristín Ómarsdóttir	Icelandic	Penguin Books
Brian Robert Moore	A Silence Shared	Tetto Murato	(Italy) Lalla Romano	Italian	Pushkin Press

=== 2022 ===
Winners in 2022 were:

Translator	Title	Original title	Author	Language	Publisher
Bernard Capinpin	A Brief Investigation to a Long Melancholia	Maikling Imbestigasyon ng Isang Mahabang Pangungulila	(Philippines) Edel Garcellano	Filipino	
Rajnesh Chakrapani and Anca Roncea	Detachment	Desprindere	(Romania) Mina Decu	Romanian	
Danielle Legros Georges	Balafres		(Canada) (Haiti) Marie-Célie Agnant	French	
Ryan Greene	The Green Sun	El Sol verde	(Mexico) Yaxkin Melchy Ramos	Spanish	
May Huang	Young Gods	新神	(Taiwan) Chiou Charng-ting	Chinese	
Mirgul Kali	To Hell with Poets	Ақындары құрысын	(Kazakhstan) Baqytgül Särmekova	Kazakh	Tilted Axis Press
Adam Mahler	Closed House/A Dau(gh)ter in His Stead	Casa pechada/Cativa en su lug(h)ar	(Spain) Luz Pichel	Castrapo	
Jay Boss Rubin	Rosa Mistika		(Tanzania) Euphrase Kezilahabi	Swahili	Yale University Press
Yasmine Seale	If You See Them Fall to Earth	—N/a	(Syria) Abd al-Ghani al-Nabulsi	Arabic	
Tim Cummins	We Will Take Our Revenge	Noi la farem vendetta	(Italy) Paolo Nori	Italian	

=== 2023 ===
Winners in 2023 were:

Translator	Title	Original title	Author	Language	Publisher
Kristine Muslim	Book of the Damned	Aklat ng Mga Naiwan	(Philippines) Amado Anthony G. Mendoza III	Filipino	
Mark Tardi	Dogs of Smaller Breeds	Psy ras drobnych	(Poland) Olga Hund	Polish	
Noor Habib and Zara Khadeeja Majoka	Oblivion and Eternity Within Me	—N/a	(India) Meeraji	Urdu	
Joaquin Gavilano	The Hostage	El rehén	(Bolivia) Gabriel Mamani Magne	Spanish	
Stoyan Tchaprazov	The Misunderstood Civilization	Криворазбраната цивилизация	(Bulgaria) Dobri Voynikov	Bulgarian	
Margaret Litvin	The Russian Quarter	الحي الروسي	(Syria) Khalil Alrez	Arabic	
Stine An	Today’s Morning Vocabulary	오늘 아침 단어	(South Korea) Yoo Heekyung	Korean	Zephyr Press
Richard Prins	Walenisi		(Kenya) Katama Mkangi	Swahili	
Priyamvada Ramkumar	White Elephant	வெள்ளையானை	(India) B. Jeyamohan	Tamil	
Caroline Froh	Words of Resistance	Widerworte	(Switzerland) Mariella Mehr	German	
Isabella Corletto	Fathers	Padri	(Italy) Giorgia Tribuiani	Italian	

=== 2024 ===
Winners in 2024 were:

Translator	Title	Original title	Author	Language	Publisher
Nayereh Doosti	A Book in Ruins	کتاب ویران	(Iran) Aboutorab Khosravi	Persian	
Jack Hargreaves	A Time No More	斷代	(Taiwan) Kuo Chiang-sheng	Chinese (Mandarin)	
Vrinda Varma	Alingam	അലിംഗം	(India) S. Girish Kumar	Malayalam	
Soje	But You Weren’t There: Notes from the Dig	나는 발굴지에 있었다	(South Korea) Heo Su-gyeong	Korean	
Jay Saper and Corbin Allardice	Partizanke: Poems from the Jewish Resistance	—N/a	(Israel) (Lithuania) Rikle Glezer	Yiddish	
Meg Arenberg	Swallower of Secrets	Mmeza Fupa	(Tanzania) Ali Hilal Ali	Swahili	
Sabrina Ramos Rubén and Verónica Dávila de Jesús	The Eve of Man	La víspera del hombre	(Puerto Rico) René Marqués	Spanish	
Zlatomira Terzieva	The Other Dream	Другият сън	(Bulgaria) Vladimir Poleganov	Bulgarian	
Dong Li	The Ruins	遗址	(China) Hui Ye	Chinese (Mandarin)	Phoneme Media
Subhashree Beeman	The Russian Testament	Le testament russe	(India) (France) Shumona Sinha	French	

=== 2025 ===
Winners in 2025 were:

Translator	Title	Original title	Author	Language	Publisher
Izidora Angel	She Who Remains	Остайница	(Bulgaria) Rene Karabash	Bulgarian	
Sean Manning	On Plants and Animals: A Literary Approach	De plantas y animales: acercamientos literarios	(Uruguay) Ida Vitale	Spanish	
Arthur Reiji Morris	The Moon Gallops Just as the Horse Gallops	月ぬ走いや、馬ぬ走い	(Japan) Kōhei Toyonaga	Japanese	
Hajar Husaini	Death and His Brother	مرگ و برادرش	(France) Khosraw Mani	Persian	
Lily Schwalb	Who Speaks in the Name of Jasmine?	Qui parle au nom du jasmin ?	(France) (Lebanon) Vénus Khoury-Ghata	French	
Hannah V. Warren	Europaia		(Germany) Alexandra Bernhardt	German	
Sylvia Franke	All the Good Guys Were Dead	Alle Guten waren tot	(Germany) (Greece) Gerasimos Bekas	German	
V.B. Borjen	Cherries	Trešnje	(Croatia) Nataša Skazlić	Croatian	
Tamina Hauser	Eul	을	(South Korea) Bak Solmay	Korean	
Madison Felman-Panagotacos	The Fallen Trees Are Also the Forest	Los árboles caídos también son el bosque	(Argentina) Alejandra Kamiya	Spanish	
