= Amanda Lee Koe =

Singaporean novelist

- 李婉婷
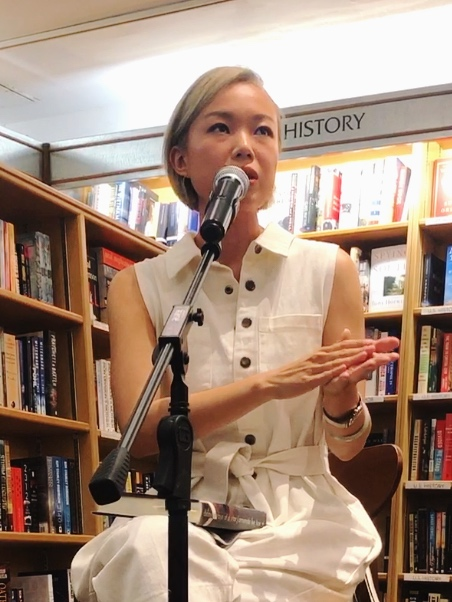
- Koe in New York, 2019
- Born: 1988 (age 37–38); Singapore
- Education: Columbia University
- Occupation: Writer

Chinese name
- Chinese: 李婉婷
- Hanyu Pinyin: Lǐ Wǎntíng
- Teochew Peng'im: Li^{2} Uêng^{2}deng^{5}

Amanda Wan Ting Lee Koe (née Lee, born 1988) is a Singapore-born, New York-based novelist and short story writer. She is best known for her debut novel, Delayed Rays of a Star (2019), which was named one of NPR's Best Books of 2019, and for being the youngest winner of the Singapore Literature Prize. Her fiction writing is known for its evocative, grounded style covering topics related to capitalism, sexuality, ethnicity, and contemporariness.

== Early life ==
Koe was born in Singapore, the oldest of three children to Chinese parents who both worked for Singapore Airlines, her father as a pilot and her mother as a flight stewardess. Her paternal grandfather was an opium-smoking Teochew laborer from Guangdong who emigrated to Singapore.

Koe has described her cultural experience growing up in 1990s Singapore as "omnivorous", watching Tsui Hark wuxia films and Disney movies.

Koe attended an all-girls school in Singapore. She fell in love with a female Uyghur soccer player when her softball team went on a training trip to Shanghai, and was sent to corrective counseling when teachers found out she had a girlfriend.

Koe became interested in Weimar culture, describing "a great affinity for Dada, Surrealism". She majored in cinema studies as an undergraduate in Singapore.

Upon graduation, Koe applied to Cahiers du cinéma and burlesque clubs in Germany and Australia for work, but was not accepted. She sold vintage and handmade clothes on Etsy for a time. While working as a waitress in a Japanese restaurant and freelancing for a creative agency, Koe had a manic episode, following which she resigned from her roles and began writing full time.

== Career ==
=== Editorial and fiction work in Singapore ===
In her early career in Singapore, Koe wrote short stories and supported herself with part-time editorial work. She was the fiction editor of Esquire Singapore, and the editor of the National Museum of Singapore's film criticism magazine, Cinémathèque Quarterly.

The stories she wrote in her early 20s, became the collection Ministry of Moral Panic. She considers the collection to be "an early work (...) raw (...) but necessary for me at that time". The book, Koe's first, won the Singapore Literature Prize in 2014, making her the youngest winner of the prize.

=== Ministry of Moral Panic ===
Ministry of Moral Panic was published by Singaporean independent press Epigram Books in 2013. The collection caused a sensation in Singapore's literary landscape when it was published, for its uncommon and unflinching depiction of idiosyncratic characters from social peripheries told via inventive narratives that questioned the conservative Singaporean state's ideological imperatives. It was seen as "a subversive, artistic interpretation of how to challenge the homogenising power of a dominant discourse". Hannah Ming-yit Ho writes in Humanities:

Koe's stories about idiosyncratic Singaporeans illustrate the way personal experiences—of memory loss, homosexual tendencies, and emotional self-expressions—are informed by, and in turn inform, the biopolitical regulation of Singaporean citizens rendered objects of biopower. In this way, her stories invite a meditation on the state, people and power.

In addition to the Singapore Literature Prize, Ministry of Moral Panic was also shortlisted for the Haus der Kulturen der Welt's Internationaler Literaturpreis, the Frankfurt Book Fair's LiBeraturpreis, and longlisted for the Frank O'Connor International Short Story Award.

=== Move to New York ===
Koe moved to New York in 2014 to attend Columbia University's Writing Program. She used her $10,000 prize money from the Singapore Literature Prize to pay the rent of her Brooklyn apartment.

While browsing for a Nan Goldin photobook at The Strand in Manhattan, Koe encountered an Alfred Eisenstaedt monograph with Marlene Dietrich on its cover. Inside the book was a photograph of Marlene Dietrich, Anna May Wong, and Leni Riefenstahl together. The photograph became the inspiration for her to write her first novel.

The working manuscript for Delayed Rays of a Star won the Henfield Prize in 2017, awarded to the best work of fiction in Columbia University's Writing Program. Koe was signed to the Wylie Agency, and the manuscript sold to Doubleday before she graduated.

=== Delayed Rays of a Star ===
A final manuscript for Delayed Rays of a Star was published by Doubleday's Nan A. Talese imprint in July 2019.

Publishers Weekly called it "ambitious and well-researched ... successfully melds historical fact with expansive and generous storytelling".

Kirkus Reviews said:

For a novel so dense with historical fact and larger-than-life celebrity cameos (everyone from John F. Kennedy to Walter Benjamin to David Bowie), its portrayals are nuanced enough that each character comes off as deeply human regardless of their fame or importance to the novel's plot ... It's the steady accumulation of intimate details like these that creates a sweeping sense of history that feels truly alive ... Expansive, complex, and utterly engrossing.

NPR said:

It is the moral tightropes each woman walks, and the razor thin edge between fulfilling one's ambition and selling one's soul, that is at the core of the novel (...) It is hard to summarize a sprawling and ambitious novel like this, so I won't — but it is expertly woven, its characters alive and full-bodied. Blending questions about pop culture, war, and art, Delayed Rays of a Star is that rare book that is neither high- nor low-brow, refusing such facile dichotomies and playing, instead, in the messiness of the grey areas.

=== Sister Snake ===
Sister Snake was published by Ecco Press (an imprint of HarperCollins) in the US/international markets, and by Ethos Books in Singapore, in late 2024. The novel tells the story of two sisters born as mythological snakes in ancient China, who now live as women in modern Singapore and New York City.

Publishers Weekly said:

"Throughout, the author seamlessly integrates centuries of Chinese culture and history with shrewd social commentary on class, gender, and race. This propulsive story astonishes."

The Straits Times said:

"[Sister Snake is] a mighty and fantastical contemporary retelling of an old Chinese folk tale with relatively unornamented but equally propulsive prose... Lee Koe proves her mettle as one of Singapore’s most formidable prose stylists today."

=== Social commentary ===
Koe has advocated for the preservation of endangered modernist architecture in Singapore. She has also commented on the Singapore state's "value-free pragmatism", a ruling style put in place by the late founding father of Singapore, Lee Kuan Yew.

=== Translation ===
Koe is a fluent Mandarin speaker and translator. She is working on a translation of Su Qing's Ten Years of Marriage, for which she was awarded a PEN/Heim Translation Grant.

== Personal life ==
Koe has named Søren Kierkegaard, Yasunari Kawabata, and early Vladimir Nabokov among her literary influences.

She has stated the importance of cinema in her life, citing Alain Resnais and Marguerite Duras's Hiroshima mon amour, Chantal Akerman's Jeanne Dielman, Wong Kar-wai's Fallen Angels, Rainer Werner Fassbinder's The Bitter Tears of Petra von Kant, and Ingmar Bergman's Cries and Whispers as films that have had a significant influence on her.

Koe identifies as queer.

== Bibliography ==
- —— (2013). Ministry of Moral Panic. Singapore: Epigram Books. ISBN 9789810757328.
- —— (2019). Delayed Rays of a Star. New York: Nan A. Talese/Doubleday. ISBN 9780385544344.
- —— (2024). Sister Snake. New York: HarperCollins. ISBN 9780063355088.
