= Iana Boukova =

Bulgarian poet, novelist, playwright and literary translator

Iana Boukova Яна Букова
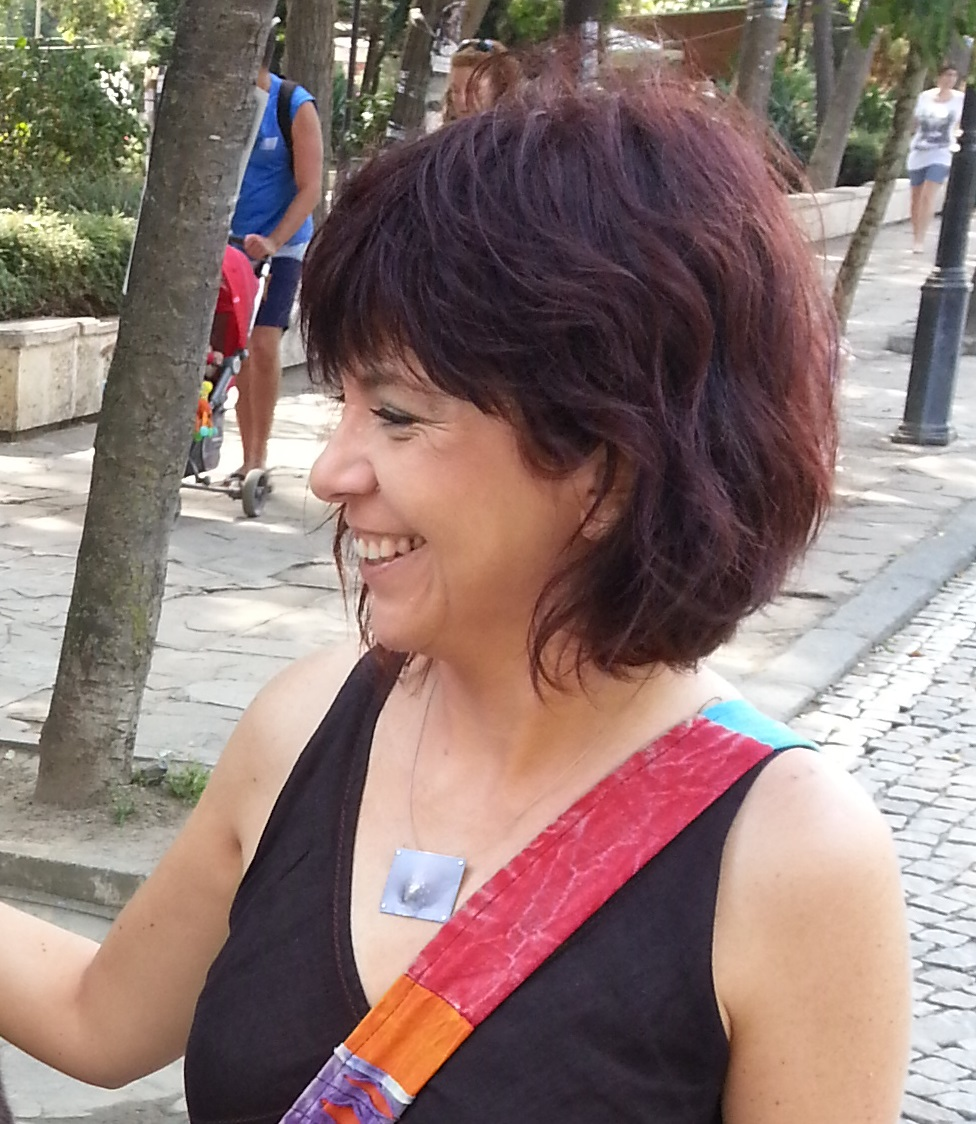
- Boukova at Apollonia Festival in 2014
- Born: July 18, 1968 (age 58); Sofia, Bulgaria
- Education: Sofia University
- Occupations: Poet, novelist, essayist, translator

Iana Boukova or Yana Bukova (Bulgarian: Яна Букова; born 18 July 1968) is a Bulgarian poet, novelist and essayist. She is considered one of the most significant Bulgarian authors of the 21st century.

== Life ==
Born in Sofia in 1968, Boukova has a degree in Classics from Sofia University. She is the author of four books of poetry, including Diocletian's Palaces (1995), Boat in the Eye (2000), Notes of the Phantom Woman (2018) and Black Haiku (2024); two collections of short stories, including A as in Аnything (2006) and Tales With No Return (2016); and the novel Traveling in the Direction of the Shadow (first published in 2009, followed by a revised edition in 2014) which is forthcoming from New York Review Books in 2026. Her poems and short stories have been translated into numerous languages, including Greek, Spanish, French, German, and Arabic. English translations of her poetry and prose have been published in various anthologies and journals in the US and the UK, including Best European Fiction 2017, Words Without Borders, Two Lines, Absinthe, Drunken Boat, Ariel Art, European Literature Network, Zoland Poetry, Take Five, At the End of the World – Contemporary Poetry from Bulgaria.

Boukova is a member of the platform Greek Poetry Now and of the editorial board of FRMK, a biannual journal on poetry, poetics, and visual arts. Poems originally written by her in Greek were included in the anthology Austerity Measures: The New Greek Poetry (Penguin Books, 2016, New York Review of Books, 2017). Her books in Greek include The Minimal Garden, Ikaros 2006 (translated by Dimitris Allos), and Drapetomania, Mikri Arktos 2018. Boukova is also the editor and translator into Bulgarian of more than ten collections and anthologies of modern and ancient Greek poetry, including Sappho's Fragments (The Union of Bulgarian Translators’ Prize in 2010), the collected poetry of Catullus, and the Pythian Odes by Pindar (The National Prize for Translation in 2011).

According to the Bulgarian poet and writer Silvia Choleva, "Boukova is a Borgesian type of author. She favors play, references, riddles unexpected twists, ironies, and the dramaturgy of verse. She possesses deep knowledge not just in the sphere of the humanities, in which she specialized, but she is also enticed by science, she knows a lot, and all of this is reflected in Notes of the Phantom Woman"

== Fiction ==
Iana Boukova is the author of the short story collections A as in Аnything (2006) and Tales With No Return (2016), and the novel Traveling in the Direction of the Shadow, which was originally published in Bulgarian in 2009 followed by a revised edition in 2014. Traveling in the Direction of the Shadow has been praised as one of the most innovative, compelling, erudite, idiosyncratic, and ambitious books to emerge from the contemporary Bulgarian literary scene for decades past. According to the PEN America Pen/Heim Translation Fund Grants jury, "Iana Boukova's novel Traveling in the Direction of the Shadow is one of the most original and compelling books to emerge from Bulgaria's contemporary literary scene: the plot, unfolding during the 19th century in and around the Balkans, offers complex insights and historical perspectives on cultures that are little known beyond their borders, and the main characters, whose names serve as titles of the novel's eight chapters, each have their own intriguing cradle-to-grave biographies. In her masterful translation, Ekaterina Petrova has captured the many nuances, registers, and literary devices of Iana Boukova's prose."

== Poetry ==
Her poetry collection, Notes of the Phantom Woman, received the Ivan Nikolov National Award for the most outstanding book of poetry in 2019. In 2018, a Greek-language version of it was also published in Athens under the title Drapetomania.

The Greek poet, artist, and translator Katerina Iliopoulou praised the collection, stating that "the Phantom-woman orchestrating the book is the invisibly present witness-poet, the one who has been turned into a ghost across the entire spectrum of the totalitarianism of merchandise, disguised as a cartoon-like superhero, showcasing the incredible transforming powers of poetry. Because the poetry at hand is not one of defeat but, rather, battle-ready poetry, the poetry of the present coming-to-be, which declares: we're perfectly able to use your own weapons!" The Athens daily morning newspaper Kathimerini underlines the significance of Iana Boukova's poetry, writing that "a pointed intellect is in charge: a restless, ironic intelligence is given utterance in a style that's meant to smart, to cause abrasions, unburdened by the delusion of prophetic speech and the concomitant assurance of high discourse." The Greek poet and critic Orfeas Apergis also praised the book in the newspaper Ta Nea, saying that "this book brings in contact the essay form (the philosophic, metaphysical 'tendency') and poetry (poetic excess), like two ever-moving, rotating grindstones that hone one another. Boukova formulates conclusions that appear scientific yet bear a poetic charge, one usually expressed in terms of terror at the metaphysical void."

== Works ==
=== Books ===
- Μαύρο Χαϊκού: Poetry. Athens: Ikaros, 2024, 72 p. ISBN 978-960-572-718-5
- Notes of the Phantom Woman: Poetry. New York: Ugly Duckling Presse, 2024, 67 p. ISBN 978-619-186-460-7
- Black Haiku: Poetry. Plovdiv: Janet 45, 2024, 88 p. ISBN 978-619-186-931-2
- Putovanje u pravcu senke: Novel. Belgrade: Blum izdavaštvo, 2023, 242 p. ISBN 978-86-6070-041-6
- Notes of the Phantom Woman: Poetry. Plovdiv: Janet 45, 2018, 67 p. ISBN 978-619-186-460-7
- К като всичко: Stories. Plovdiv: Janet 45, 2018, 2. еа., 120 p. ISBN 978-619-186-429-4
- Drapetomania: Poetry. Athens: Mikri Arktos, 2018, 64 p. ISBN 978-960-8104-98-3
- 4 Tales With no Return: Разкази. Plovdiv: Janet 45, 2011, 44 p. ISBN 978-619-186-291-7
- Traveling in the Direction of Shadow. Novel. Second revised edition Plovdiv: Janet 45, 2014, 2. ed., 311 p. ISBN 978-619-186-052-4
- Traveling in the Direction of Shadow. Novel. First edition. Sofia: Stigmata, 2009, 312 p. ISBN 978-954-336-066-6
- К като всичко: Stories. Sofia: Stigmata, 2006, 103 p. ISBN 978-954-336-016-1
- The Minimal Garden: Poetry. Athens: Ikaros Books, 2006, 56 p. ISBN 978-960-8399-26-6
- Boat in the Eye: Poetry. Sofia: Heron Press, 2000, 45 p. ISBN 978-954-336-016-1
- Diocletian Palaces: Poetry. Sofia: Svobodno poet. obshtestvo, 1995, 39 p. ISBN 954-8642-16-6

=== Works in anthologies and literary collections ===
- Boukova, Iana. (2018). The Stone Quarter [Fiction]. In: Absinthe. World Literature in Translation: Hellenisms. Michigan: Michigan Publishing Services 2018, pp. 65–78. ISBN 978-1607855095
- Boukova, Iana. (2017). The Teacher Came Back Drunk [Fiction]. In: Best European Fiction 2017, by Nathaniel Davis (Editor), Eileen Battersby (Preface), Champaign, Illinois. ISBN 978-1628971439
- Boukova, Iana. (2017). Ausgewaehlte Gedichte [Poetry]. In: Kleine Tiere zum Schlachten: Neue Gedichte aus Griechenland, von Adrian Kasnitz (Herausgeber, Uebersetzer), Köln. ISBN 978-3947676019
- Boukova, Iana. (2016). A as in Anything [Fiction]. In: Two Lines 25, Fall 2016. San Francisco, California in 2016. ISBN 978-1931883542
- Boukova, Iana. (2016). - The Minimal Garden, - Black Haiku, - For Miltos Sachtouris, - Fractal [Poetry]. In: Austerity Measures: The New Greek Poetry, by Van Dyck, Karen (Editor), New York: Penguin UK; Bilingual edition. ISBN 978-0241250624
- Boukova, Iana. (2013). Poems [Poetry]. In: Voix de la Mediterranee: Anthologie poetique 2013. Venissieux, Lyon, 2013, 123 p., ISBN 978-2845622319
- Boukova, Iana. (2012). - The Poet, All in White, - The Dusseldorf Match Plantations, - Apology on Monday Lunchtime [Poetry]. In: At the End of the World. Contemporary Poetry from Bulgaria. Bristol: Shearsman Books 2013, pp. 82–89. ISBN 978-1-84861-261-7
- Boukova, Iana. (2008). Les Pommes [Fiction]. In: Concertos pour phrase: 17 nouvelles contemporaines de Bulgarie. Paris: HB Editions, 2008, 210 p.. ISBN 978-2914581868
- Boukova, Iana. (2007). Thirteen poems [Poetry]. In: Take Five 07, Shoestring Press, Nottingham 2007, Iana Boukova p.p. 29-41. Translated by Jonathan Dunne ISBN 978-1-904885-66-5
- Boukova, Iana. (2007). - A Short Poem about the Evening and Music, - Self-Portrait on a Background of Begonias, - Balkan Naive Painters [Poetry]. In: Karaoke poetry bar, Futura, Athens 2007, pp. 58–62. ISBN 978-969-6654-64-0

=== Selected literary translations ===
- Sappho. (2019). 100+1 Fragments preface and translation into Bulgarian by Iana Boukova. Sofia : Poetry publishing house DA, 2019, 159 p. ISBN 978-619-7082-51-7
- Pindar. (2011). Pythian Odes preface and translation into Bulgarian by Iana Boukova. Sofia : Stigmata, 2011, 176 p. ISBN 978-954-336-131-1
- Sappho. (2010). 100+1 Fragments preface and translation into Bulgarian by Iana Boukova. Sofia : Stigmata, 2010, 159 p. ISBN 978-954-336-091-8
- Gaius Valerius Catullus. (2009). Poetry preface and translation into Bulgarian by Iana Boukova. Sofia : Stigmata, 2009, 176 p. ISBN 978-954-336-089-5
