= Naivo =

Malagasy writer

- Born: Madagascar
- Writing career
- Language: French
- Years active: 1996-now
- Genre: historical fiction
- Notable work: Beyond the Rice Fields
- Website: naivoharisoa.blogspot.com

Naivo (born Naivoharison Patrick Ramanmonjisoa) is a Malagasy writer of historical fiction and the author of the first Malagasy novel to be translated into English, Beyond the Rice Fields.

== Early life ==
Naivo worked as a teacher in Paris. He emigrated to Canada where he works as a journalist and lives in Ottawa.

== Career ==
His debut adult fiction novel was Beyond the Rice Fields. The novel draws inspiration from Malagasy history. It was first published in French by Éditions Sépia in 2016. It is the first work of fiction from Madagascar to be translated into English. The translation was made possible through a 2015 PEN/Heim Translation Fund Grant. Beyond the Rice Fields was longlisted for the 2018 BTBA for Fiction and Poetry. It received a Five-Heart Review from Foreword Reviews.

His short story collection Madagascar entre poivre et vanille: Petits portraits à plume débridée, deals with Madagascar's coups, the corrupt judiciary system, monarchy and colonialism.

== Bibliography ==
Novels

- Beyond the Rice Fields (Restless Books, 2017)

Short stories

- Madagascar entre poivre et vanille: Petits portraits à plume débridée (2016)

Non-Fiction

- Les mutations culturelles à Madagascar vues à travers le prisme du hainteny, "poésie" traditionnelle (2018)

== Awards ==
Nominations

2018

- BTBA for Fiction and Poetry Longlist for Beyond the Rice Fields (Restless Books, 2017)

Won

1996

- RFI/ACCT Prize for short story "Dahalo"
