= The Spirit of Romance =

1910 book of literary criticism by Ezra Pound

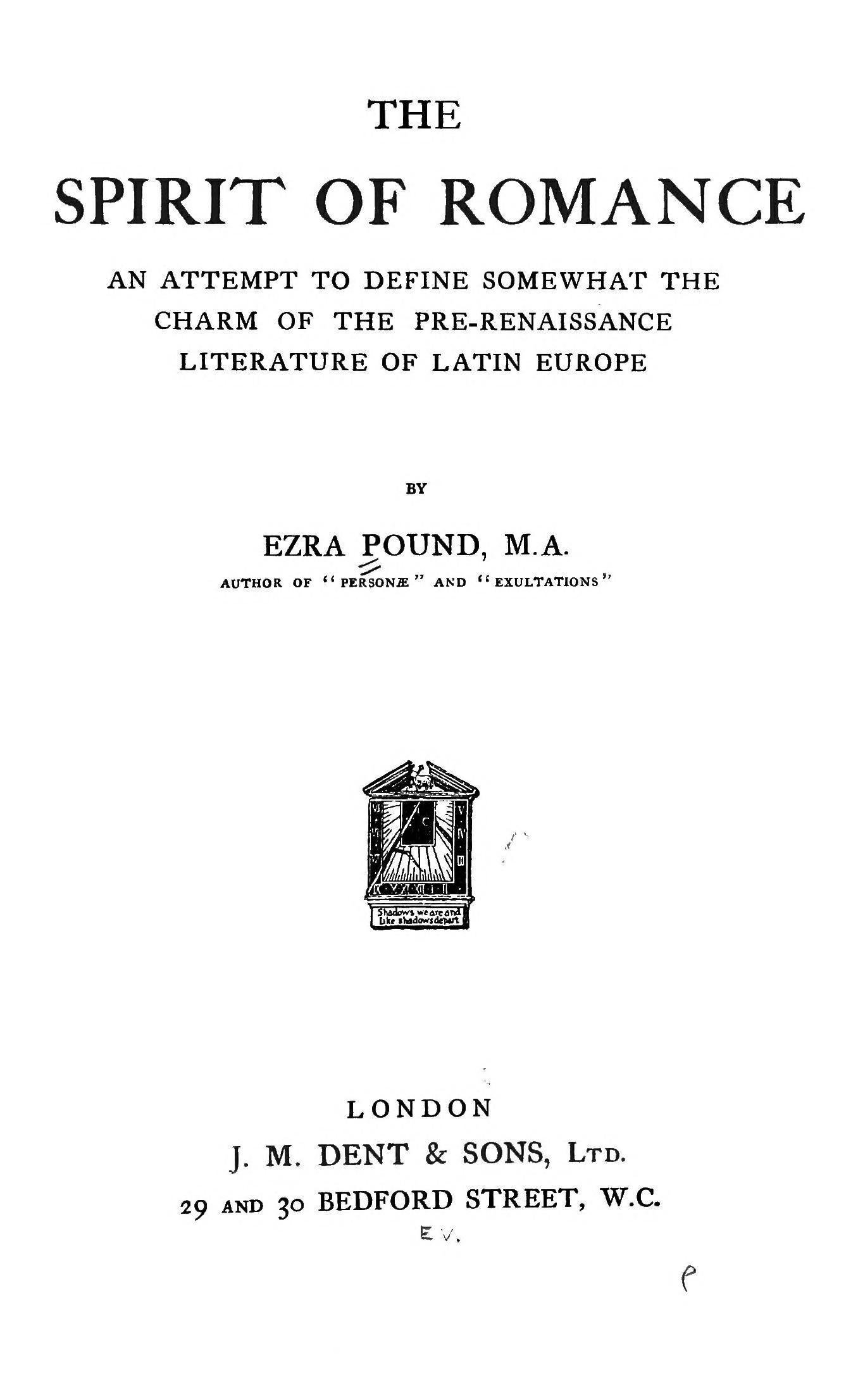
- Title page, first edition
- Author: Ezra Pound
- Language: English
- Subject: Literary criticism
- Publisher: J. M. Dent and Sons
- Publication date: 1910
- Publication place: England
- OCLC: 228697091
- LC Class: PN681.P6

The Spirit of Romance is a 1910 book of literary criticism by the poet Ezra Pound. It is based on lectures he delivered at the Regent Street Polytechnic in London between 1908 and 1909 and deals with a variety of European literatures. As with Pound's later, unfinished poem The Cantos, the book follows "a pattern, at once historical and atemporal, of cultural beginnings and rebeginnings".

Written as a contradiction to the nationalistic and normative literary studies of the time, in The Spirit of Romance Pound advocates a synchronous scholarship of literature in which one can weigh "Theocritus and Yeats with one balance". In his discussion, Pound provides partial translations of works from a variety of European authors, including Guido Cavalcanti and François Villon, many of whom had been forced outside the canon by earlier critics.

The Spirit of Romance was published by London-based J. M. Dent and Sons, upon recommendation from Pound's friend Ernest Rhys. A 1932 printing saw the addition of an eleventh chapter, and a "completely revised edition" followed in 1952. Though reviews were sparse when the book was first published, The Spirit of Romance has since become an important addition to literary scholarship.

== Background ==
The Spirit of Romance was written by Ezra Pound (1885–1972), his first major work of literary criticism. Interested in poetry at an early age, Pound obtained a B.Phil. from Hamilton College in 1905. He continued his studies at the University of Pennsylvania, where he received his MA in 1906. Pound was awarded a Harrison fellowship soon after graduation to continue his studies and complete a doctoral degree. Intending to write about jesters in the works of Lope de Vega, the outspoken Pound – who often challenged his professors' assertions, insisting that George Bernard Shaw was a better writer than Shakespeare – was eventually told that he was wasting his own time and that of the institution and left the university, his doctorate incomplete. In 1908 he left on a self-imposed exile to Europe, passing through Gibraltar and Venice before settling in London. There, whilst working on his poetry, he gave a series of lectures at the Regent Street Polytechnic; these lectures eventually became the basis of The Spirit of Romance.

Philological studies at the University of Pennsylvania were focused mainly on 19th-century theories and methods, through which Pound "floundered somewhat ineffectually" as a graduate student. This trend, against which Pound eventually rebelled, focused on the study of works from a single background to construct national identities and literary canons, "cultural legacies". These legacies excluded those who had lost the political battles which shaped the nation, removing them and their beliefs from the constructed identity. Carlos Riobó of Bard College characterizes this philology as a pseudo-science which ultimately worked to neatly demarcate "the precariously unified, modern culture from the old fractious one by adducing textual proof of cultural and linguistic origins".

Nonetheless, Pound continued to Romance philology at the university and would later state that The Spirit of Romance derived much of its material from notes he took in the classes of his thesis advisor, Professor Rennert.

== Contents ==
The first edition consists of ten chapters and a preface; María Rosa Menocal describes these chapters as "strung-together essays". Beginning with the 1932 edition it contained 11 chapters; one, "Psychology and Troubadors", was added after having been first published in the London-based review The Quest. This addition, according to Richard Sieburth, means that the work reaches further back, to the "Eleusinian sexual rites of Ancient Greece". The division of chapters is as follows:

First edition

1. The Phantom Dawn
2. Il Miglior Fabbro
3. Proença
4. Geste and Romance
5. La Dolce Lingua Toscana
6. Il Maestro
7. Montcorbier, alias Villon
8. The Quality of Lope de Vega
9. Camoens
10. Poeti Latini

Revised edition

1. The Phantom Dawn
2. Il Miglior Fabbro
3. Proença
4. Geste and Romance
5. Psychology and Troubadours
6. Lingua Toscana
7. Dante
8. Montcorbier, alias Villon
9. The Quality of Lope de Vega
10. Camoens
11. Poeti Latini

== Analysis ==
In the preface, Pound disavows "the slough of philology". The essays provide an outline of what philology should be, a form of comparative literature which Anne Birien defines as "the studies of forces traceable across texts", works without which are but artifacts. Pound emphasizes the intrinsic value and qualities of the works as well as literary interpretation and evaluation. Such research would be capable of weighing "Theocritus and Yeats with one balance", and judge "dull men as inexorably as dull writers of today", signifying a push for works to be considered as synchronous, with historical works an essential component of present ones.

Menocal writes that, through The Spirit of Romance, Pound attempted to continue the work of Dante Alighieri in De vulgari eloquentia, "saving" poets from the exile of normative literary canon. Riobó expands on this, writing that Pound was able to enfranchise poets and works who had hitherto been written out of the national canons by earlier critics, providing new translations of their work to "lend them a voice" to reach modern audiences. One of the poets Pound "saved", Guido Cavalcanti, would later become a common persona for Pound to adopt in his poetry.

The book includes numerous partial translations of Romance poems, described as "merely exegetic". Pound was critical of contemporary translators, whom he viewed as "obfuscating" the poets by treating works as artifacts. He instead attempted to convey "certain forces, elements or qualities, which were potent in medieval literature in Romance and are still potent in English", avoiding literal translations in favor of "words and metaphors intended to evoke in the reader the same feelings evoked in the work's original reader". Riobó writes that this was problematic, as ultimately the works had to be filtered through Pound's sensibilities before reaching the readers, and thus "preventing the reader from fully assessing it for himself or herself".

In his foreword to the 2005 edition of The Spirit of Romance, Sieburth writes that the book can be read as "a preparation of the palette" for Pound's later (unfinished) epic poem, The Cantos. Both deal with a similar theme, that of "a pattern, at once historical and atemporal, of cultural beginnings and rebeginnings". Both The Spirit of Romance and The Cantos depend heavily on quotation and references to other works, a technique Pound later named excernment.

== Publishing history ==
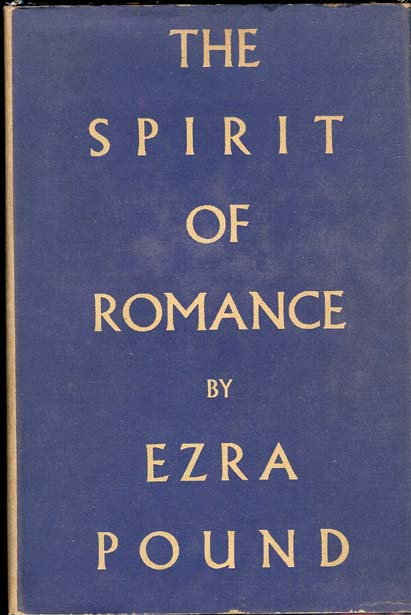
Dust jacket for the revised edition (1952)

The Spirit of Romance was published in 1910 by the London-based J. M. Dent and Sons. Though Pound was unknown to Dent, mutual friend Ernest Rhys convinced the publisher to issue the book. The full title was The Spirit of Romance: An Attempt to Define Somewhat the Charm of the Pre-Renaissance Literature of Latin Europe, credited to Ezra Pound, M.A.; Riobó writes that this emphasis on Pound's academic credentials are illustrative of Pound's defiance of the doctoral committee at the University of Pennsylvania.

A 1929 reprint of The Spirit of Romance was edited heavily by Pound. The first portion of the book was issued as part of the first volume of Prolegomena by "To" in Le Beausset, France, in 1932. Spearheaded by George Oppen, this edition added a new chapter and also included Pound's How to Read. However, the second volume (and second portion) was never released. A "completely revised edition" was published in 1952, by New Directions in the United States and Peter Owen in the United Kingdom. The translations in this edition were heavily reworked, with words such as hath and doth removed entirely. The prose, however, remained similar to the original edition, which Hugh Kenner in Poetry attributes to Pound understanding that significant changes to the content "would require a wholly new book".

== Reception and legacy ==
Pound regarded the work as originally published as having issues. In a 1911 letter to Yone Noguchi, Pound wrote that he was considering sending the Japanese poet a copy of his book, but "it has many flaws of workmanship". In 1920, Pound's father, Homer, perhaps at his son's request, submitted The Spirit of Romance to the University of Pennsylvania as Pound's dissertation, asking whether the work could be regarded as sufficient for his son to receive his doctorate. The chair of the English department, Felix Schelling, replied that Pound had done "none of the work demanded" for a PhD. (Note: In 1931 Pound submitted Guido Cavalcanti Rime as a thesis to the university; at that time he was told he had to return to the campus to complete the six outstanding classes he had neglected to take.) In the foreword to the 1929 republishing of The Spirit of Romance, Pound wrote that the work could "be greatly improved", though "the mode or statement ... will have to stand as a partial confession of where I was in the year 1910".

According to Pound, The Spirit of Romance received little attention when first published, as sending such works to literary critics was then uncommon, and that he "could not conveniently have afforded the stamps". At least one scholarly review was written, by W. P. Ker for The Modern Language Review. Ker wrote that, though the "book ought to be an encouragement to many young people to undertake some explorations, and make discoveries for themselves", it was extremely difficult for readers without the necessary background knowledge to understand, even if they wanted to learn of the poetry. He also found that Pound erred in abandoning philology, for "the study of poetry, if it is to be anything but monotonous praise, is bound to be technical and analytic".

Stanley K. Coffman, reviewing the revised edition for Books Abroad in 1953, found that it had a "curious air of calm but affectionate appraisal of its materials", which, although more casual than the average academic work, nonetheless "probably accomplishes a good deal more than the strictly and dryly scholarly" works. He described the book as interesting both as a revelation of Pound's early theories, as well as "a presentation of poetry that is worth our attention". Kenner, also reviewing the revised edition, found that it was "still readable after forty-three years, because of the energy with which it recognizes the existence and relevance of a number of facts", drawing the reader's attention to facts without presenting too much in-depth detail.

K.K. Ruthven characterizes the work as a "history of the search for standards of excellence in literature", using Romance literature. T.S. Eliot describes it as "early but important", and in his preface to a collection of Pound's essays on literature writes that it should be read in full; Eliot notes in particular the book's emphasis on the works of François Villon, then little known in the English-speaking world.

Riobó describes The Spirit of Romance as redefining Romance philology through "a new, necessarily contingent voice, which invited, in fact was predicated on, cyclical reinterpretation".

== Works cited ==
- Birien, Anne (2007). "Modernist Poetics of Estrangement: Pound's Answer to Mallarmé". In David L Hoover; Sharon Lattig (eds.). Stylistics: Prospect & Retrospect. PALA. Vol. 3. New York: Rodopi. pp. 23–38. ISBN 978-1-4356-1334-8.
- Coffman, Stanley K. (1953). "The Spirit of Romance by Ezra Pound". Books Abroad. 27 (4): 385. doi:10.2307/40092358. JSTOR 40092358. (subscription required)
- Eliot, TS (1979). "Introduction". Literary Essays of Ezra Pound. Westport: Greenwood Press. ISBN 978-0-313-21167-6.
- Hakutani, Yoshinobu (2001). "Ezra Pound, Yone Noguchi, and Imagism". In Yoshinobu Hakutani (ed.). Modernity in East-West Literary Criticism: New Readings. Madison: Fairleigh Dickinson University Press. pp. 63–86. ISBN 978-0-585-43915-0.
- Kenner, Hugh (1953). "Ezra Pound and Provision of Measures". Poetry. 83 (1): 29–35. JSTOR 20585128. (subscription required)
- Ker, W.P. (1912). "The Spirit of Romance. An Attempt to Define Somewhat the Charm of the Pre-Renaissance Literature of Latin Europe by Ezra Pound". The Modern Language Review. 7 (1): 127–29. doi:10.2307/3712855. JSTOR 3712855. (subscription required)
- Menocal, María Rosa (1994). Shards of Love: Exile and the Origins of the Lyric. Durham: Duke University Press. ISBN 978-0-8223-1405-9.
- Moody, David A (2007). Ezra Pound: Poet: A Portrait of the Man and His Work, Volume I, The Young Genius 1885–1920. Oxford: Oxford University Press. ISBN 978-0-19-957146-8.
- Murphy, Russell Elliott (2007). "Ezra Pound". Critical Companion to T. S. Eliot: A Literary Reference to His Life and Work. New York: Facts on File. pp. 547–49. ISBN 978-0-8160-6183-9.
- Pound, Ezra (1910). The Spirit of Romance. London: J.M. Dent and Sons.
- Pound, Ezra (2005). The Spirit of Romance. New York: New Directions. ISBN 978-0-8112-1646-3.
- Redman, Tim (2010). "Dante and Early Italian Poetry". In Ira B. Nadel (ed.). Ezra Pound in Context. Cambridge: Cambridge University Press. ISBN 978-0-521-51507-8.
- Riobó, Carlos (2002). "The Spirit of Ezra Pound's Romance Philology: Dante's Ironic Legacy of the Contingencies of Value". Comparative Literature Studies. 39 (3): 201–22. doi:10.1353/cls.2002.0026. JSTOR 40247346. (subscription required)
- Ruthven, K.K. (1969). A Guide to Ezra Pound's Personae, 1926. Berkeley: University of California Press. OCLC 23242.
- Sieburth, Richard (2005). "Introduction". The Spirit of Romance. New York: New Directions. ISBN 978-0-8112-1646-3.
