= Intan Paramaditha =

Indonesian writer and feminist academic

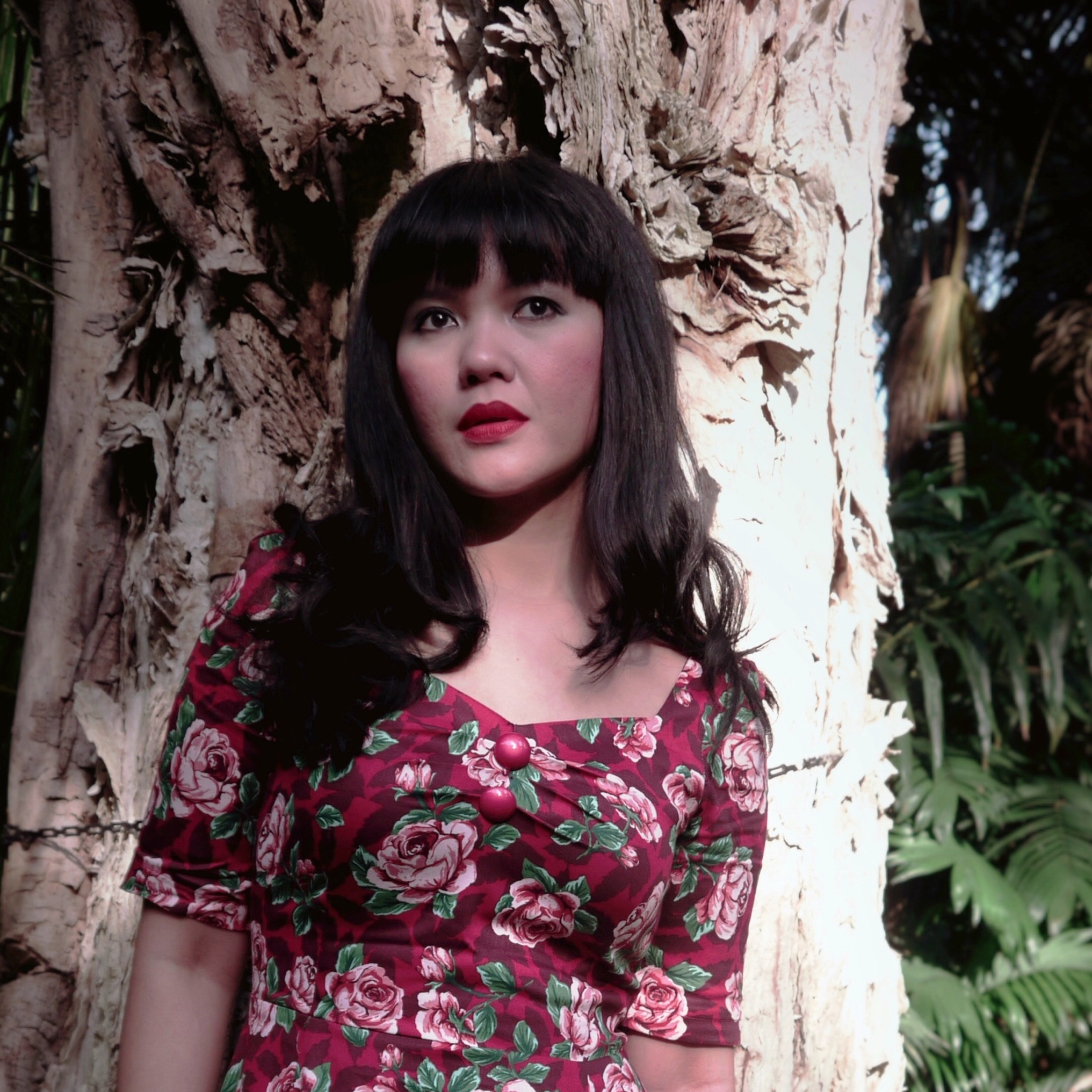
- Occupation: Author
- Awards: PEN Translates Award (UK) The Stella Prize longlist (Australia) Tempo Best Literary Fiction (Indonesia)

Academic background
- Education: New York University

Academic work
- Institutions: Macquarie University; Sarah Lawrence College; University of Indonesia
- Notable works: Apple and Knife; The Wandering

Intan Paramaditha is an Indonesian author and noted feminist academic. Her work has been described as focusing on "the intersection between gender and sexuality, culture and politics".

== Literary works ==
Paramaditha's works have been described as "gothic feminist". In 2005, Intan Paramaditha's short-story collection Sihir Perempuan (Black Magic Woman) was shortlisted for the Khatulistiwa Literary Award. In 2010 Intan co-authored horror anthology Kumpulan Budak Setan (The Devil’s Slaves Club) with Eka Kurniawan and Ugoran Prasad, and in 2013 her short story Klub Solidaritas Suami Hilang (The Missing Husbands Solidarity Club) won the Kompas Best Short Story Award.

Her debut novel, Gentayangan: Pilih Sendiri Petualangan Sepatu Merahmu (The Wandering: Choose Your Own Red-Shoes Adventure), received a PEN Translates Award from English PEN in 2018, the PEN/Heim Translation Fund Grant from PEN America, and the Tempo Best Literary Work for Prose Fiction in 2017; it was translated into English by Stephen J. Epstein and published by Harvill Secker in February 2020. The Wandering was longlisted for the 2021 Stella Prize.

Her short story anthology, Apple and Knife, contains short stories from earlier collections, and was published in English in 2018.

Paramaditha's essay, "On the Complicated Questions Around Writing About Travel," was selected for The Best American Travel Writing 2021.

== Academic career and research ==
Paramaditha holds a PhD in cinema studies from New York University. She is now based in Sydney, Australia, and teaches Media and Film Studies at Macquarie University. She previously taught at Sarah Lawrence College and the University of Indonesia.

Paramaditha's research and teaching interests "include feminism, transnationalism and cosmopolitanism, postcolonial studies, and global film, media, and activism". Her academic articles have been published in journals such as Feminist Review, Inter-Asia Cultural Studies, Asian Cinema, Visual Anthropology, Film Quarterly, Jump Cut, and Social Identities.

== Talks ==
Intan Paramaditha has spoken at literary events/festivals such as Broadside Feminist Ideas Festival 2019, the Emerging Writer's Festival 2019, the Jakarta International Literary Festival 2019, the London Book Fair 2019, the Singapore Writer's Festival 2018, the Hong Kong International Writer's Festival 2018, the Europalia Arts Festival 2017, the Frankfurt Book Fair 2015 and the Kraków Conrad Festival 2023.
