= Geet Chaturvedi =

Indian writer (born 1977)

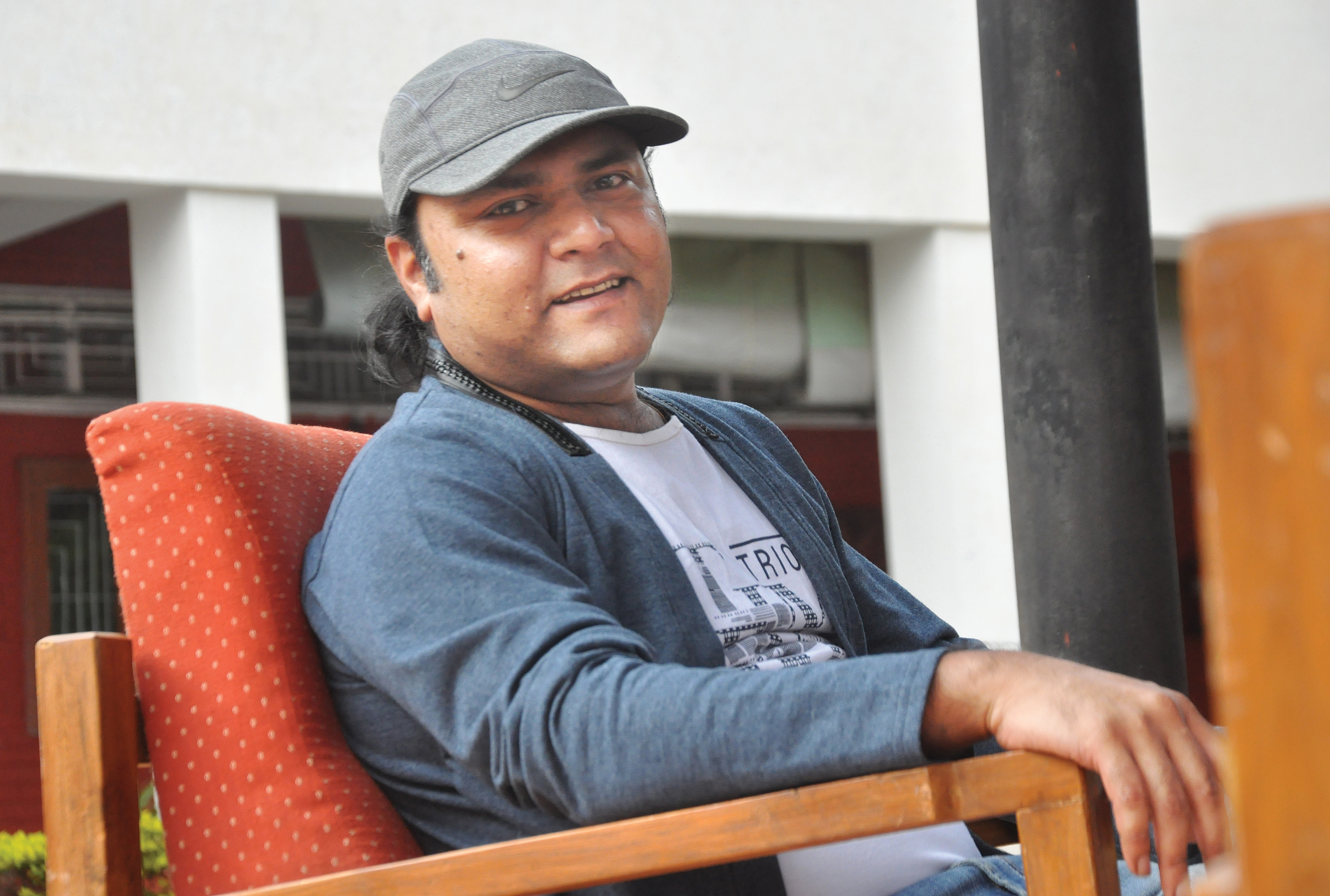
- Geet Chaturvedi in 2018
- Born: 27 November 1977 (age 48); Mumbai, Maharashtra, India
- Occupations: Poet, lyricist, screenwriter, short story author, novelist, journalist and translator
- Writing career
- Period: 1994–present
- Genres: Poetry, Novel, Screenwriting
- Notable awards: Bharat Bhushan Award for Poetry, Krishna Pratap Award for Fiction, Spandan Award for poetry, Krishna Baldev Vaid Fellowship for fiction, Syed Haider Raza Fellowship for fiction
- Movement: Postmodern literature
- Website: www.geetchaturvedi.com

Geet Chaturvedi (born 27 November 1977) is a Hindi poet, short story author, and novelist. Often regarded as an avant-garde writer, he was awarded the Bharat Bhushan Agrawal Award for poetry in 2007 and Krishna Pratap Award for Fiction in 2014. His novel 'Simsim', translated into English by Anita Gopalan, was longlisted for the JCB Prize for Literature 2023 and also won the PEN/Heim Translation Fund Grants. He lives in Bhopal, India. He is active both as a fiction writer and critic. In 2011, The Indian Express included him in a list of the 'Ten Best Writers' of India. His poems have been translated into 22 languages. His book of essays 'The Master of Unfinished Things' was included in the list of '75 notable translations worldwide' in 2025 by World Literature Today.

Chaturvedi is the author of eleven books including the poetry collections Aalaap me girah in 2010, Nyoonatam Main in 2017, and Khushiyon Ke Guptchar in 2019. He also published two collections of novellas, Savant Anti Ki Ladkiyan and Pink Slip Daddy, in 2010. The novella "Pink Slip Daddy" was considered to be one of the best works of fiction in contemporary Hindi writing by the literary periodical Kathadesh.

== Poetry ==
Geet Chaturvedi was awarded the Bharat Bhushan Agrawal Award in 2007. His poetry has been translated into 22 languages. In Anita Gopalan's English translation, his poems have been published in AGNI, PEN America, Poetry International, Sycamore Review, World Literature Today, Words without Borders, Asymptote, Chicago Review, The Offing, Modern Poetry in Translation, and elsewhere.

=== The Amphibian ===
His long poem Ubhaychar ('The amphibian') was published in 2010, and treats topics such as memory and collective myths.

=== Aalaap mein girah ===
Aalaap mein girah (lit. 'Nodule in Prelude') is the first volume of his poems, published in 2010 with positive reviews. It established Chaturvedi as the leading poet of his generation.

=== Nyoonatam Main ===
Nyoonatam Main (lit. 'The Minimal I') is the second volume of his poems, published in 2017. It was named among the best books of Hindi poetry by many literary critics along publications like Femina, Navbharat Times etc. It was included in the Dainik Jagran Bestseller list 2017–2018. Nyoonatam Main won the prestigious Spandan Award for Hindi poetry.

=== Khushiyon Ke Guptchar ===
Khushiyon Ke Guptchar (lit. 'Secret Agents of Joys') is the third book of Chaturvedi's poems. It became an instant bestseller after its publication. The books has 81 poems of his, written during 2014 to 2017.

== Work ==
=== Sim Sim ===
'Sim Sim', published in 2023, is a celebrated novel by Geet Chaturvedi, originally written in Hindi and later translated into English by Anita Gopalan. The novel poignantly explores the lives of Sindhi Hindu refugees following the Partition of India, delving into themes of memory, loss, and resilience. Central to the story is Basar Mal, who, after losing his family and homeland, finds solace in a library he builds in Mumbai, while other characters like Dilkhush Sambosewala and Mangan’s Ma add depth to the narrative’s exploration of displacement and longing. 'Sim Sim' has received significant critical acclaim in both its Hindi and English versions. In Hindi, it was shortlisted for the prestigious 'Valley of Words (VoW) Awards 2024' for the originality of its voice and the poignant portrayal of the Sindhi refugees. The English translation was awarded the PEN/Heim Translation Fund Grants by PEN America, recognizing its literary merit and the quality of its translation. Notably, Simsim was longlisted for the JCB Prize for Literature 2023, one of India’s most prestigious literary awards but now discontinued, further cementing its status as a groundbreaking contemporary literary work. The novel's lyrical prose and sensitive portrayal of displacement have garnered critical acclaim, with The Hindu describing it as "indelible, in that it cannot be truly forgotten." Simsim is often compared to the works of V.S. Naipaul, Marcel Proust, and J.M. Coetzee.

=== The Master of Unfinished Things ===
The Master of Unfinished Things, translated into English by Anita Gopalan and published by Penguin Books, is a triptych of memoirs, diary entries, creative prose, and essays that blends introspection with myth, anecdote, and literary reflection. Widely praised as an “ode to incompleteness,” its themes range from the author’s relationships with books, writers, cricket, and nature to deeper inquiries into writing, identity, and memory.

In a May 2025 review for Frontline, critic Aditya Sinha described Chaturvedi as a "writer's writer", and noted that the book serves as a profound investigation into the craft of writing. Anita Gopalan’s translation has been consistently commended for its fluency and tonal sensitivity, and the book was selected by World Literature Today as one of the “75 Notable Translations Worldwide” in 2025.

=== Aunt Savant And Her Daughters ===
Savant Anti Ki Ladkiyan (lit. 'Aunt Savant And Her Daughters'), his first book of fiction, contains three novellas set in Mumbai. The common theme of the stories is women obsessed with the idea of love.

=== Pink Slip Daddy ===
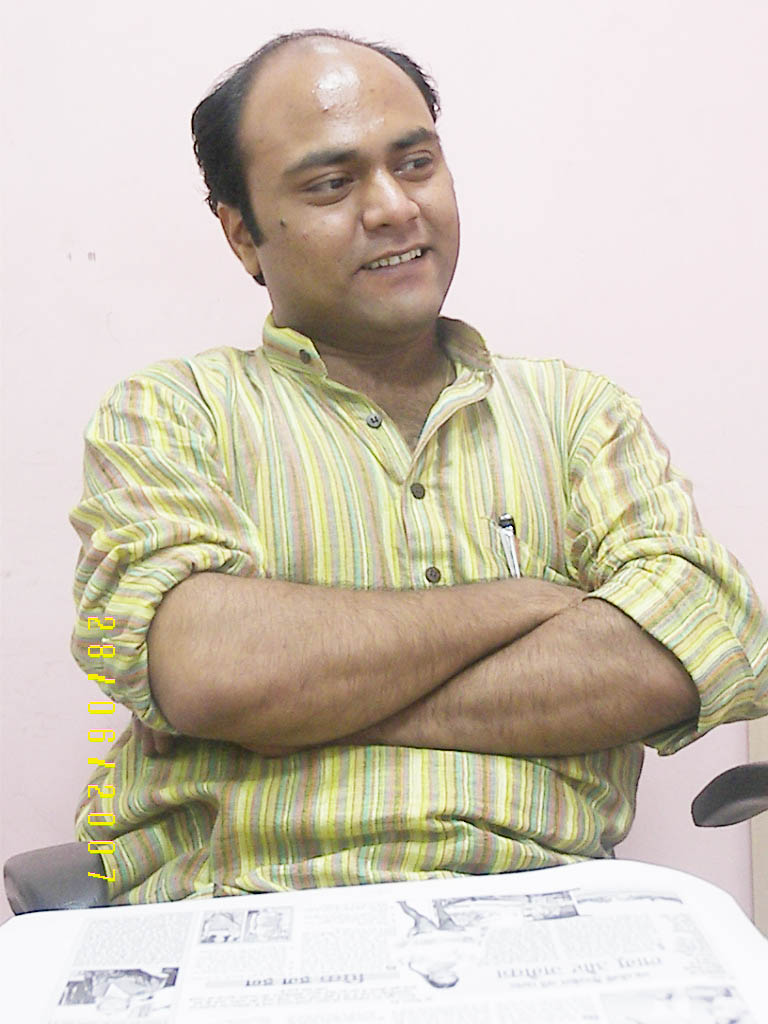
Geet Chaturvedi

Pink Slip Daddy, published in 2010, is also a collection of three novellas.The title story is about a man called Prafful Shashikant Dadhich or PSD, nicknamed "Pink Slip Daddy". The book received the Krishna Prataap Award for Fiction 2014. The award statement mentioned Chaturvedi's "mastery as a storyteller", and his "taut poetic language".

== Translation ==
Among the poets he has translated into Hindi, Sabeer Haka, Adam Zagajewski, Bei Dao, Dunya Mikhail, Iman Mersal, Eduardo Chirinos, Adunis, Mahmoud Darwish, Pablo Neruda, Federico Garcia Lorca are to name a few.

== Selected bibliography ==
=== Poetry ===
- 2019: Khushiyon Ke Guptchar. Rukh Publications, New Delhi. December 2019. ISBN 978-81-943123-0-7.
- 2017: Nyoonatam Main. Rajkamal Prakashan, New Delhi. January 2017. ISBN 978-81-267-2971-5.
- 2010: Aalaap mein girah. Rajkamal Prakashan, New Delhi. February 2010. ISBN 978-81-267-1853-5.

=== Fiction ===
- 2023: Sim Sim. Hind Yugm, New Delhi. January 2023. ISBN 978-93-92820-30-4.
- 2023: Gomutra. Rajkamal Prakashan, New Delhi. October 2023. ISBN 978-81-19835-44-7.
- 2010: Savant Aunty Ki Ladkiyan. Rajkamal Prakashan, New Delhi. June 2010. ISBN 978-81-267-1922-8.
- 2010: Pink Slip Daddy. Rajkamal Prakashan, New Delhi. June 2010. ISBN 978-81-267-1933-4.

=== Non-fiction ===
- 2021: Adhuri Cheezon Ka Devta. Rukh Publications, New Delhi. January 2021. ISBN 978-81-943123-1-4.
- 2018: Table Lamp. Rajkamal Prakashan, New Delhi. May 2018. ISBN 978-81-267-3088-9.

=== Translated by Geet Chaturvedi ===
- 2018: Khud se Kai Sawal, by Amit Dutta, Rajkamal Prakashan, New Delhi. ISBN 978-81-267-3073-5.
- 2004: Chile Ke Jungalon se, Prose by Pablo Neruda, Samvad Prakashan

=== Editing ===
- 2018: Lekhak Ka Cinema, Writings on world cinema by Kunwar Narayan, edited by Geet Chaturvedi, Rajkamal Prakashan, New Delhi. ISBN 978-81-267-3047-6.

=== Geet Chaturvedi in translation ===
- 2025: The Master of Unfinished Things, translated by Anita Gopalan, Penguin Books, New Delhi, India. ISBN 978-01-43471639.
- 2023: Sim Sim, translated by Anita Gopalan, Penguin Books, New Delhi, India. ISBN 978-0-670-09728-9.
- 2022: Nyoonatam Main (Punjabi), Poems, translated by Pawan Naad, Autumn Art Publishers, Patiala, Punjab. ISBN 978-93-94183-41-4.
- 2021: Chitta Phool Je Gulabi Hona Chahunda, Essays on literature in Punjabi translation, translated by Gaurav, Autumn Art Publishers, Patiala, Punjab. ISBN 978-93-90849-24-6.
- 2019: The Memory of Now, translated by Anita Gopalan, Anomalous Press, Rhode Islands, USA. ISBN 978-1-939781-44-4.
- 2019: Simsim, Marathi translation by Jui Kulkarni, Book Hungama, Pune

== Awards and honors ==
Chaturvedi has won several awards and recognitions for his writings.

- 2007: Bharat Bhushan award for poetry
- 2011: One of the ten best writers of India, Indian Express
- 2014: Krishna Pratap Katha Samman for fiction for Pink Slip Daddy
- 2016: PEN/Heim Translation Fund Grants for Sim Sim to his translator Anita Gopalan
- 2018: Shailesh Matiyani Katha Samman for fiction for Pink Slip Daddy
- 2019: Krishna Baldev Vaid fellowship for fiction
- 2019: Syed Haider Raza fellowship for fiction
- 2020: Vagdhara Navratna Samman for poetry for Nyoonatam Main
- 2020: Spandan Kriti Samman for poetry for Nyoonatam Main
- 2021: Vatayan International Literature Award for his contribution to Hindi literature (United Kingdom)
- 2023: Sim Sim longlisted for the JCB Prize for Literature
- 2024: Sim Sim shortlisted for the VoW Book Awards
- 2024: Vageeshwari Samman for non-fiction Adhuri Cheezon Ke Devta
- 2025: The Master of Unfinished Things included in the list of '75 Notable Translations of 2025' by World Literature Today

== Other recognition ==
- During 2017–2018, Nyoonatam Main was regularly listed in the Dainik Jagran Bestselling Books. It was listed in the Best Books of the Year lists by many publications including Navbharat Times, Dainik Jagran, Nai Duniya and Femina Magazine.
- Khushiyon Ke Guptchar was listed into the top five Hindi poetry books of the year in 2019-2020 by the leading newspaper Navbharat Times.
