= Richard Sieburth =

Academic

Richard Sieburth (born 1949) is Professor Emeritus of French Literature, Thought and Culture and Comparative Literature at New York University (NYU). A translator and editor, Sieburth retired in 2019 after 35 years of teaching at NYU and 10 years at Harvard.

Sieburth is an authority on French renaissance poetry, European romanticism and literary modernism in general, particularly on the life and work of Ezra Pound. In addition to his numerous editions of the works of Pound for New Directions and the Library of America, he has published translations of Nostradamus, Maurice Scève, Louise Labé, Friedrich Hölderlin, Georg Büchner, Walter Benjamin, Gershom Scholem, Charles Baudelaire, Stéphane Mallarmé, Henri Michaux, Antonin Artaud, Michel Leiris, Eugène Guillevic, and Jacques Darras. He has also published translations into French of American poets such as Michael Palmer.

== Early life and education ==
Sieburth obtained a BA from the University of Chicago in 1970 and a PhD from Harvard University in 1976.

== Awards ==
Sieburth was made a Chevalier dans l’ordre des palmes académiques in 1985, elected a Fellow of the American Academy of Arts and Sciences in 2007, and received an Annual Award in Letters from the American Academy of Arts in Letters in 2017, while his forthcoming Late Baudelaire (Yale UP, 2020) has been supported by a Guggenheim Fellowship for Translation. Among many honors, he received the PEN/Book-of the Month Translation Prize in 2000 for his Selected Writings of Gérard de Nerval and his translation of Maurice Scève's Emblems of Desire was shortlisted for the Weidenfeld Prize and the PEN Poetry Translation Prize in 2003. He was twice shortlisted for the French-American Foundation Translation Prize, in 2007 for Stroke by Stroke (by Henri Michaux) and then in 2010 for The Salt Smugglers (Gérard de Nerval), while his translations of Eugène Guillevic's Geometries was shortlisted for the Three Percent Poetry Translation Prize in 2012. Most recently, his A Certain Plume (Michaux) received the 2019 PEN Prize for Poetry in Translation and his Songs from a Single Eye was longlisted for the 2020 PEN Prize for Poetry in Translation.

== Selected works ==
=== Authored books ===
- Instigations: Ezra Pound and Remy de Gourmont (Harvard University Press, 1978)
- Signs in Action: Ideograms of Pound and Michaux (Red Dust Books, 1987)
- Weights and Measures/Poids et mesures (Ulysse Fin-de-Siècle, 1988)

=== Editor ===
- Ezra Pound: A Walking Tour in Southern France: Ezra Pound Among the Troubadours (New Directions, 1992)
- Ezra Pound: Poems & Translations (Library of America, 2003)
- Ezra Pound: The Pisan Cantos (New Directions, 2003)
- Ezra Pound: The Spirit of Romance (New Directions, 2005)
- Ezra Pound: New Selected Poems & Translations (New Directions, 2010)
- Benjamin Constant: Adolphe translated by Alexander Walker (riverrun, 2021)

=== Translations ===
- (& as editor) Hymns and Fragments by Friedrich Hölderlin (Princeton University Press, 1984)
- Moscow Diary by Walter Benjamin (Harvard University Press, 1986)
- Nights As Day, Days As Night by Michel Leiris (Eridanos Books, 1988)
- Sun by Michael Palmer (Ulysse Fin-de-Siècle, 1988)
- (& as editor) Gerard de Nerval – Selected Writings (Penguin Classics, 1999)
- Emergences/Resurgences by Henri Michaux (Skira/The Drawing Center, 2000)
- (& as editor) Emblems of Desire: Selections from Maurice Scève's "Délie" (University of Pennsylvania Press, 2002); 2nd revised ed., (Archipelago Books, 2004)
- The Fullness of Time: Poems by Gershom Scholem (Ibis Editions, 2003)
- (& as editor) Lenz by Georg Büchner (Archipelago Books, 2005)
- Stroke by Stroke by Henri Michaux (Archipelago Books, 2006) - includes two Michaux texts: "Stroke by Stroke" (Par des traits) and "Grasp" (Saisir)
- The Salt Smugglers by Gérard de Nerval (Archipelago Books, 2009)
- Geometries by Eugène Guillevic (Ugly Duckling Press, 2010)
- (& as editor) The Prophecies by Nostradamus (Penguin Books, 2012)
- (& as editor) Love Sonnets & Elegies by Louise Labé (NYRB/Poets, 2014)
- Songs from a Single Eye by Oswald von Wolkenstein (Merano: Medus, 2015 — foreword by Siegfried Walter de Rachewiltz). Second, revised edition (New Directions, 2019)
- Nights as Day, Days as Night by Michel Leiris (Spurl Editions, 2017 — foreword by Maurice Blanchot)
- (& as editor) Greetings from Angelus: Poems by Gershom Scholem (Archipelago Books, 2018)
- (& as editor) A Certain Plume by Henri Michaux (NYRB/Poets, 2018)
- (with James E. Montgomery) War Songs by Antarah Ibn Shaddid (NYU Press, 2018)
- (with Howard Limoli) Aseroë by François Dominique (Bellevue Literary Press, 2020)
- (& as editor) Late Fragments: Flares, My Heart Laid Bare, Prose Poems, Belgium Disrobed by Charles Baudelaire (Yale University Press, 2022)
- (& afterword) John Scotus Eriugena at Laon & Other Poems by Jacques Darras (World Poetry Books, 2022)
- (& preface) Frail Riffs by Michel Leiris (Yale University Press, 2024)I
- (& introduction) Wickerwork by Christian Lehnert (Archipelago Books, 2025)I
- (& introduction) Under the Edge of Night by Johannes Bobrowski (NYRB/Poets, 2026)

=== Other ===
- (as translator) The Cenci by Antonin Artaud, performed at the Ohio Theater in New York City in February 2008.
- (co-translator with Françoise Gramet) Louise Bourgeois, Psychoanalytic Writings, in Laratte-Smith, ed., The Return of the Repressed: vol. 2 (London: Vilette Editions, 2012)
- (interview) Jacques Darras, A L'Ecoute: Entretiens avec Richard Sieburth sur la poésie de langue anglaise et sa traduction (In'hui/Le Castor Astral, 2018)
- (as Executive Producer) Sqizo: A Film about Louis Wolfson (2019), directed by Duccio Fabbri.
