= FRMK =

Greek literary and visual arts journal

- Native name: ΦΡΜΚ
- Categories: Poetry, poetics, visual arts
- Frequency: Periodical
- Founded: 2013
- Country: Greece
- Based in: Athens, Greece
- Language: Greek
- Website: frmk.gr

FRMK (Greek: ΦΡΜΚ, also transliterated as Farmako) is a Greek literary journal based in Athens, with a focus on poetry, poetics, translation, criticism, visual arts, and performance. Founded in 2013, it publishes thematic issues on poetry, poetics, translation, criticism, visual arts, and performance. In 2017, FRMK received an honorary distinction at the Greek State Literary Awards, together with the literary magazine Odos Panos.

== History and editorial profile ==
FRMK was founded in Athens in 2013. Its first issue was published in spring 2013. The journal focuses on poetry, poetics, translation, critical writing, and visual arts.

The journal publishes thematic issues centered on contemporary literary and cultural topics, including poetry, visual writing, documentary forms, ecological themes, and the relation of poetry to other artistic practices.

In 2022, MOMus-Experimental Center for the Arts hosted a two-day program dedicated to FRMK as part of the Polytropa series, focusing on the relation of poetry to theory, literature, visual arts, and performance.

== Reception and recognition ==
LiFO discussed FRMK in a feature on contemporary Greek poetry magazines. In 2024, Greek News Agenda featured FRMK in its "Literary Magazine of the Month" series on the occasion of the journal's ten-year anniversary issue, Tenderness-Care-Solidarity.

In 2017, FRMK received an honorary distinction at the Greek State Literary Awards, together with the literary magazine Odos Panos.
