= Song Lin (poet) =

Chinese poet (born 1959)

Song Lin 宋琳 is a Chinese poet, born in Fujian in 1959. Moving to France in 1991, after imprisonment due to activity in the June Fourth Movement, he lived in exile in France, Singapore and Argentina, before returning to China in 2003. His poems "explore his sojourns in several countries, the natural world outside him, and his own inner landscape". In addition to his poetic work, he is known as the editor of Jintian. Considered "a major voice in contemporary Chinese poetry", he received two book-length English translations from Zephyr Press and Giramondo Publishing. The former, Sunday Sparrows, translated by Jami Proctor-Xu, received the 2020 Northern California Book Award for Poetry in Translation.
