= Senselessness =

- Author: Horacio Castellanos Moya
- Original title: Insensatez
- Translator: Katherine Silver
- Cover artist: William Blake; The Body of Abel Found by Adam and Eve - 1826
- Language: Spanish
- Publisher: New Directions Publishers
- Publication date: 2004
- Publication place: El Salvador
- English publication date: May 15, 2008
- ISBN: 978-84-8310-314-2
- OCLC: 62752401
- LC Class: PQ7539.2.C34 I67 2005

Senselessness is the English translation of the 2004 novel Insensatez, originally written in Spanish by Salvadoran writer Horacio Castellanos Moya. Senselessness was translated by Katherine Silver and published in 2008 by New Directions Publishers. The translation was short-listed for the 2009 Best Translated Book Award.

== Plot ==
A sex-obsessed lush of a writer is employed by the Catholic Church to edit and tidy up a 1,100-page report on the army's massacre and torture of the indigenous villagers a decade earlier. The writer becomes mesmerized by the poetic phrases written by the indigenous people and becomes increasingly paranoid and frightened, not only by the spellbinding words he must read, but also by the murderers and generals that run the country. The country, never named, is identifiable as Guatemala through the mention of two presidents, Vinicio Cerezo Arevalo and Efrain Rios Montt.
