= Khalil Alrez =

Syrian novelist and translator (born 1956)

- خليل الرز
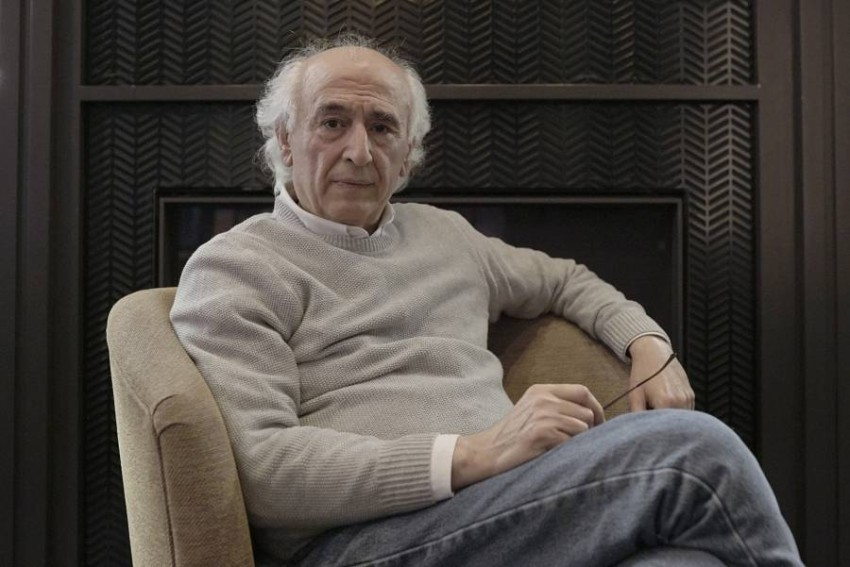
- Born: 1956 (age 69–70); Raqqa, Syrian Arab Republic
- Education: BA in Arabic language and Literature
- Occupations: Author and Translator
- Notable work: The Russian Quarter

Khalil Alrez (Arabic: خليل الرز}) is a Syrian novelist and translator. He was born in 1956. He has published nine novels and one play and was shortlisted for the Arabic Booker Prize in April 2020 for his novel The Russian Quarter.

== Biography ==
Khalil Alrez was born in 1956 in Raqqa, Syria. He later moved to Aleppo to continue his university studies. In 1980, Alrez earned his Bachelor's degree in Arabic language and literature from the University of Aleppo. Then, he moved to Russia and lived in Saint Petersburg and Moscow from 1984 to 1993 to study theater; he also learned the Russian language while there. He worked in Russia as a translator and radio host. Years later, Khalil returned to Syria and worked as a writer and translator for the Ministry of Culture of Syria. Alrez has published nine novels, including “Al Badal”, “Sulawesi”, “Bl Tasawi”, “Youm Akhar” and others. He has also translated various works from Russian into Arabic, including: “Tale about the lost time by Evgeny Schwartz”, “Selected Russian Short Stories” and “Selected Stories of Anton Chekhov”. Recently, Alrez’s novel “The Russian Quarter” was shortlisted for the International Prize for Arabic Fiction. Alrez left Syria to escape the civil war and now lives in Belgium.

== Works ==
=== Novels ===
- Sulawesi, 1994
- Another Day (original title: Youm Akhar), 1995
- Obsessive Air (original title: Wiswas al Hawaa), 1997
- A White Cloud in the Window of the Grandmother (original title: Gaima Baidaa fi Shubak Al Gadda), 1998
- An Ireland Salmon (original title: Salamon Irlandi), 2004
- Where is Safed, Youssef? (original title: Aina Taqaa Al Safad Ya Youssef), 2008
- An Equal Measure (Original title: Biltasawi), 2014
- Al-Badal, 2017
- The Russian Quarter (Original title: Al-hye al-Russi), 2019.

=== Play ===
- Two (original title: Ethnan), 1996.

=== Translations ===
- “Selected Russian Short Stories of Leonid Andreyev, Ilya Grigoryevich, and Nabokov”, 2005.
- “Tale about the lost time by Evgeny Schwartz”, 2006.
- “Selected Stories of Anton Chekhov”, 2007.
