= Jacques Darras =

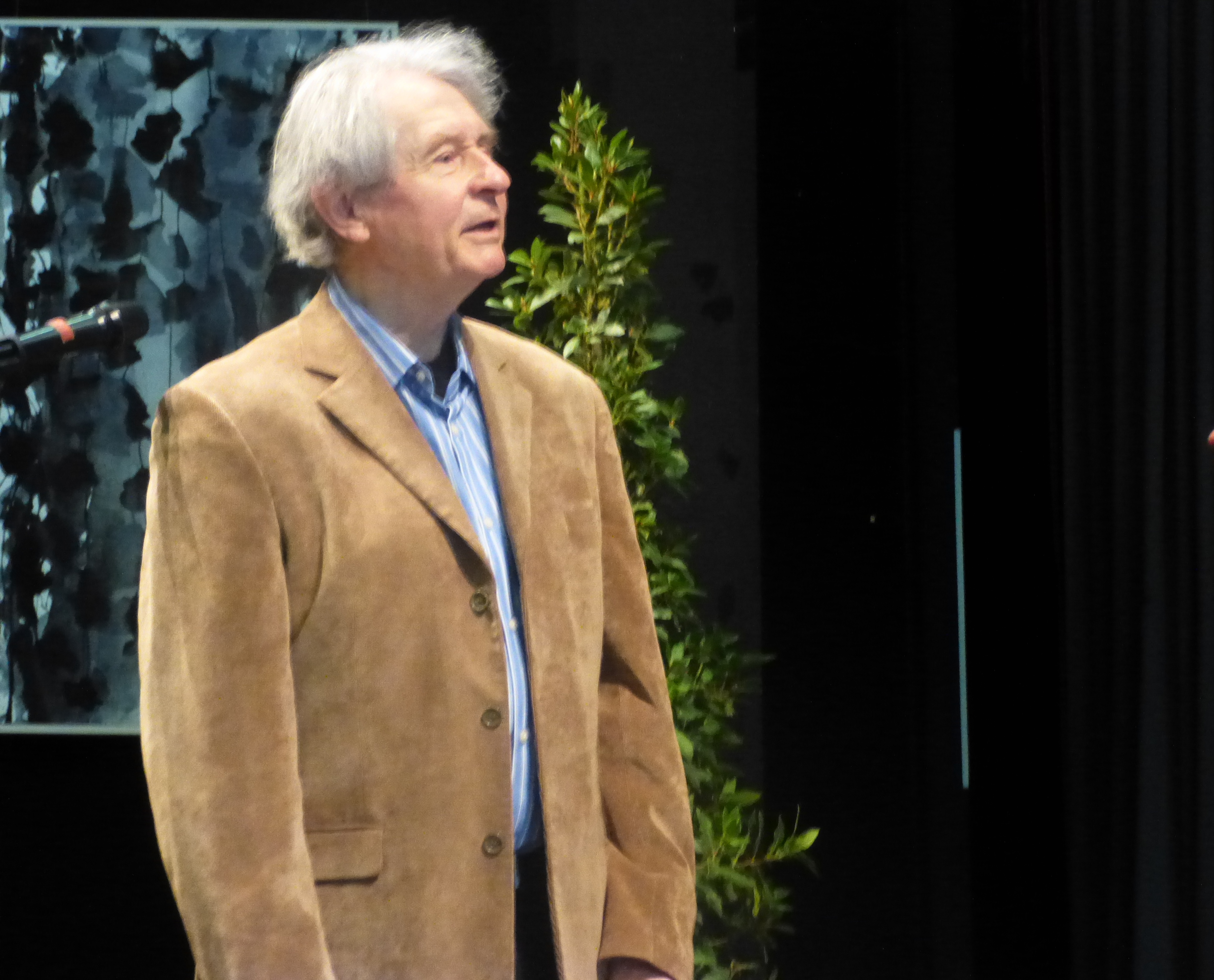
- Jacques Darras at a poetry festival in April 2013
- Born: 1939 (age 86–87); Ponthieu, France
- Occupation: Poet

Jacques Darras is a French poet and 2006 winner of the Grand Prix de Poésie from the Académie Française.

Darras gave the 1989 Reith lecture series under the theme "Beyond the Tunnel of History" about Anglo-French relations 200 years after the French Revolution.
