= Mushtaq Ahmad Yusufi =

Urdu humorist

NI; SI; Mushtaq Ahmad Yusufi
- مُشتاق احمد يُوسُفی
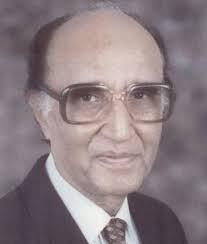
- Born: Mushtaq Ahmad Yusufi; 4 September 1923; Tonk, British India
- Died: 20 June 2018 (aged 94); Karachi, Pakistan
- Occupations: Banker, writer (satire and humour)
- Writing career
- Notable awards: Sitara-i-Imtiaz; Hilal-i-Imtiaz

Mushtaq Ahmad Yusufi (Urdu: مُشتاق احمد يُوسُفی – Muštāq Ẹḥmad Yoūsufi, 4 September 1923 – 20 June 2018) was a Pakistani Urdu satirist and humourist. Yousufi also served as the head of several national and international governmental and financial institutions. He received in 1999 the Sitara-i-Imtiaz Award and in 2002 the Hilal-i-Imtiaz Award, the highest literary honour given by the Government of Pakistan.

== Early life and career ==
Yusufi was born in a learned family of Jaipur, Rajasthan, on 4 September 1923. From his paternal side, he was of ancestral Pashtun descent from the Yusufzai clan, while from his maternal side he was a Rajput of the Rathore clan. His father, Abdul Karim Khan Yusufi, was chairman of the Jaipur Municipality, and later Speaker of the Jaipur Legislative Assembly. Yusufi completed his early education in Rajputana and earned BA from Agra University while MA Philosophy and LL.B. from Aligarh Muslim University. After the partition of India and formation of Pakistan, his family migrated to Karachi, Pakistan.

In 1950, he joined Muslim Commercial Bank, where he became deputy general manager. Mushtaq Ahmad Yusufi joined Allied Bank Ltd in 1965 as managing director. He became president of United Bank Ltd in 1974, and chairman of the Pakistan Banking Council in 1977.

He was awarded the Quaid-i-Azam Memorial Medal for distinguished services in banking.

== Works ==
His Urdu novel Aab-e-Gum was translated in English as 'Mirages of the Mind' by Matt Reeck and Aftab Ahmad.

Other famous Urdu books of his are Chiragh Talay (چراغ تلے), Khakam Badahan (خاکم بدہن), Zarguzasht (زرگزشت), Sham e Shair Yaran (شام شعر یاراں).

Considering the standard of previous works of Yousafi, Sham e Shair Yaran turned out to be a great disappointment for many Yousafi lovers. Mr Yusufi himself mentioned that he was not satisfied yet with the book but due to his frail health, everyone insisted on having it published on as is basis.

== Contemporary comments ==
Ibn-e-Insha, himself an Urdu satirist and humorist, wrote about Mushtaq Ahmad Yusufi: "...if ever we could give a name to the literary humour of our time, then the only name that comes to mind is that of Yusufi!" Another scholar, Dr Zaheer Fatehpuri, wrote, "We are living in the 'Yousufi era' of Urdu literary humour..." The Yousufi era started in 1961 when Yousufi's first book Chiragh Talay was published. So far 11 editions of this book have appeared. It has a foreword titled 'Pehla pathhar' written by the author himself plus 12 satirical and humorous columns and articles. In 2008, he was living in Karachi and often appeared on TV programmes as well as seminars. His fifth book Shaam-e-Shair-e-Yaaran (2014) was launched at the Arts Council of Pakistan in Karachi in 2014 at a ceremony presided over by a well-known writer Zehra Nigah who said at the event, "Neither Yousufi sahib nor any of his books will ever get old". Another distinguished writer from Pakistan, Iftikhar Arif, also spoke on this occasion. A major English-language daily newspaper in Karachi called him "a wordsmith par excellence".

== Death ==
On 20 June 2018, after a protracted illness he died in Karachi aged 94. On 21 June 2018, he was laid to rest after his funeral prayer was offered in Sultan masjid in DHA, Karachi.

== Awards and recognition ==
- Sitara-i-Imtiaz (Star of Excellence) Award in 1999 by the President of Pakistan
- Hilal-i-Imtiaz (Crescent of Excellence) Award in 2002 by the President of Pakistan
- Quaid-i-Azam (Memorial Medal)
- Pakistan Academy of Letters Award for 'Best Book' in 1990
- Hijra Award
- Adamjee Literary Award for 'Best Book'

== Bibliography ==
- Chiragh Talay (1961)
- Khakam-ba-dahan (1969)
- Zarguzasht (1976)
- Aab-e-Gum (1989)
- Sham-e-Shair-e-Yaaraan (2014)
