= Horacio Castellanos Moya =

Salvadoran writer and journalist (born 1957)

Horacio Castellanos Moya (born 1957) is a novelist, short story writer, and journalist. He was born in Honduras but grew up in El Salvador, and is considered one of the country's most important writers.

== Life and work ==
Castellanos Moya was born in 1957 in Tegucigalpa, Honduras to a Honduran mother and a Salvadoran father. His family moved to El Salvador when he was four years old. He lived there until 1979 when he left to briefly attend York University in Toronto.

On a visit home, he witnessed a demonstration of unarmed students and workers in which twenty-one people were killed by government snipers. He left El Salvador that March, but did not go back to Canada for school. Instead, he traveled to Costa Rica and Mexico, where he found work as a journalist. He wrote sympathetically about the Farabundo Martí National Liberation Front, a political party that formed following the 1932 Salvadoran peasant massacre. He soon, however, grew disillusioned by violent fighting within the party.

In 1991, Castellanos Moya returned to El Salvador to write for a monthly cultural magazine, Tendencias. In 1995, he contributed to the founding of the weekly publication Primera Plana and worked there until 1996. Over the next few years, he wrote and published several novels, including Senselessness, The She-Devil in the Mirror, and Revulsion: Thomas Bernhard in San Salvador.

The protagonist in Revulsion is a Thomas Bernhard-esque character who returns to El Salvador after eighteen years to deliver a 119-page diatribe against the country. The novel enraged some Salvadorans with some calling for a book ban and others throwing the book into fires. Castellanos Moya's mother received death threats against her son and in 1997 Castellanos Moya fled El Salvador.

Starting in 2002, he lived in Mexico City in self-imposed exile for ten years. He began writing a new novel called Guatemala: Nunca más! (Never Again!). It was published as Insensatez in 2004. In 2008, the novel became his first work to be translated into English.

Castellanos Moya was granted residencies in a program supported by the Frankfurt International Book Fair (2004–2006) and as a Writer-in-Residence at City of Asylum/Pittsburgh (2006–2008). In 2009, he was a guest researcher at the University of Tokyo. Currently he teaches at the University of Iowa and is a regular columnist for Sampsonia Way Magazine where he "looks for topics that open debates, new perspectives, and controversy."

His first novel, La diáspora, which concerns the struggles of the exiles from the Salvadoran Civil War, won the Premio Nacional de la Novela, awarded by the Universidad Centroamericana "José Simeón Cañas", in 1988.

In 2014 he received Chile's Manuel Rojas Ibero-American Narrative Award.

== Bibliography ==
=== Novels ===
- La diáspora (1989)
- Baile con serpientes (1996). Dance with Snakes, trans. Lee Paula Springer (Biblioasis, 2009)
- El asco. Thomas Bernhard en San Salvador (1997). Revulsion: Thomas Bernhard in San Salvador, trans. Lee Klein (New Directions, 2016)
- La diabla en el espejo (2000). She-Devil in the Mirror, trans. Katherine Silver (New Directions, 2009)
- El arma en el hombre (2001)
- Insensatez (2004). Senselessness, trans. Katherine Silver (New Directions, 2008)
- Familia Aragón saga (2003–present)
  - Donde no estén ustedes (2003)
  - Desmoronamiento (2006)
  - Tirana memoria (2008). Tyrant Memory, trans. Katherine Silver (New Directions, 2011)
  - La sirvienta y el luchador (2011)
  - El sueño del retorno (2013). The Dream of My Return, trans. Katherine Silver (New Directions, 2015)
  - Moronga (2018)
  - El hombre amansado (2022)

=== Short story collections ===
- ¿Qué signo es usted, niña Berta? (1981)
- Perfil de prófugo (1987)
- El gran masturbador (1993)
- Con la congoja de la pasada tormenta (1995)
- Indolencia (2004)
- Con la congoja de la pasada tormenta. Casi todos los cuentos (2009)
- Una pequeña libreta de apuntes (2009)

=== Poetry ===
- Poemas (1978)
- La margarita emocionante (1979)
- Cinco poetas hondureños (1981)

=== Essays and other ===
- Recuento de incertidumbres. Cultura y transición en El Salvador (1993)
- Breves palabras impúdicas. Un ensayo y cuatro conferencias (2010)
- La metamorfosis del sabueso. Ensayos personales y otros textos (2011)
- Cuaderno de Tokio. Los cuervos de Sangenjaya (2015)
- Envejece un perro tras los cristales. Cuaderno de Tokio seguido de Cuaderno de Iowa (2019)
- Roque Dalton: Correspondencia clandestina y otros ensayos (2021)

== Awards and honours ==
- 1998: Premio Nacional de Novela, Universidad Centroamericana José Simeón Cañas, for La diáspora
- 2001: Finalist for Rómulo Gallegos Prize, for La diabla en el espejo
- 2009: XXVIII Northern California Book Award, for Insensatez
- 2014: Manuel Rojas Ibero-American Narrative Award
