= Aab-e-Gum (book) =

1989 Urdu book by Mushtaq Ahmad Yusufi

- Author: Mushtaq Ahmad Yusufi
- Language: Urdu
- Genre: Humorous fiction
- Published: 1989
- Publisher: Ilm-o-Irfan Publishers
- Publication place: Pakistan
- Media type: Hardcover
- Pages: 364
- ISBN: 978-969-573-052-2

Aab-e-Gum (Urdu: آبِ گم) is a 1989 Urdu book by Mushtaq Ahmad Yusufi. The book is a collection of satirical and humorous articles. Aab-e-Gum has also been translated into English under the title, "Mirages of the Mind".

== Synopsis ==
Aab-e-Gum describes some fictional characters who are hilariously nostalgic. Humor has been created by keeping the psychology of these characters and their retrospect in front, in such a way that the book is not only the masterpiece of Mushtaq Ahmad Yusufi but also one of the best in the history of Urdu humour.

== Awards ==
Aab-e-Gum received the Hijra Award and the National Literary Award for the best book in 1990.
