= Su Qing (writer) =

Chinese writer

- 蘇青
- Born: 1914; Ningbo, Zhejiang, China
- Died: 1982 (aged 67–68); Shanghai
- Occupations: Writer, Editor
- Writing career
- Pen name: Feng Heyi (馮和儀)
- Notable work: Ten Years of Marriage

Su Qing (traditional Chinese: 蘇青; simplified Chinese: 苏青; Wade–Giles: Su Ch'ing; 1914–1982) was a twentieth-century Chinese writer. Known for her work detailing the female experience, she was a contemporary of Eileen Chang and is often compared to her.

== Life ==
Su Qing was born in 1914 in Ningbo, Zhejiang Province. In 1933, at the age of nineteen, she was admitted to National Central University (now Nanjing University) as an English major.

Due to family pressure, she quit school and married a man that her parents selected. She moved to Shanghai with her husband. In the 1940s, after an unhappy ten-year marriage, she and her husband divorced. She then started her new life as an occupational writer.

Su Qing was appointed as an editor at Shaoxing Opera Group after the Anti-Japanese War. During the War of Liberation, she publicly criticized the Communist government in a series of essays and was eventually jailed for two years in 1955. Due to the bold subject matter of her work and her alleged connections to hanjian (those who were viewed as race traitors), Su Qing's career was troubled near the end of her life, and she was widely attacked and insulted by anti-hanjian groups. She died in Shanghai in 1982 after struggling with poverty and illness.

== Works ==
Su Qing was once called Feng Yunzhuang (馮允莊) and used the pen name Feng Heyi (馮和儀) for her early works. She began her writing career in 1935 and started using Su Qing as her pen name in 1937. Much of her work serves on commentary on the patriarchal society she lived in and the role of women in it.

Delivery (產女), her first work, was published in the magazine called Lun Yu. Most of her works were published in magazines including: The Wind of the Universe (宇宙風), Yi Jing (逸經), Ancient and Modern (古今), The Talk about the Weather (風雨談), and Heaven and Earth (天地).

Most of the essays she wrote between 1935 and 1944 were collected into one of her major works, Drifting Brocade. This work alluded to her personal life, and Su Qing said that "these essays are a reminiscence of my past."

Her representative work, Ten Years of Marriage was published in 1943. The semi-autobiographical novel describes her experiences about her married life. It contains her initial feelings on marriage, the bitterness and happiness of delivery, the extramarital love and the associations with different kinds of men. Owing to the authentic descriptions of sexual psychology, she was described as a bold female writer and received both praise and blame. The fiction had its separate edition the following year. Ten Years of Marriage had 18 editions at the end of 1948, which surpassed Eileen Chang's fiction. In 1947, she created the continuation of Ten Years of Marriage.

She also wrote a novel called The Beauty on the Wrong Road (歧路佳人), which caused a shortage of printing paper.

During the years at Shaoxing Opera Group, she compiled these plays: Hate Remains in the Land, Qu Yuan, Baoyu and Daiyu and The Biography of Li Wa. Baoyu and Daiyu has been performed more than 300 times since 1954 and created the highest records of the Opera group.

== See also ==
- Lü Bicheng – a Republican-era activist and writer
