= Ten Years of Marriage =

1943 book by Su Qing

- Cover of a 1945 edition of the novel
- Author: Su Qing
- Original title: 結婚十年
- Language: Chinese
- Published: 1943
- Publication place: China

Ten Years of Marriage (结婚十年) is a 1943 Chinese novel written by Su Qing 苏青 (1914–1982). Owing to her authentic descriptions of sexual psychology, Su Qing was described as a bold female writer and her work received mixed praise.

== Contents ==
Ten Years of Marriage is a semi-autobiographical work which tells the story of a Chinese woman's life after marriage. It depicts her feelings as a new bride, the bitterness and happiness of delivery, her extramarital love and her associations with different kinds of men. The protagonist, Su Huaiqin is a woman born into a fatherless household. She was considered a xiaojie (someone of poor standing), before she married Xu Chongxian. Her new husband is from a big feudal family. He is called Shaoye (young master), by the family servants. The novel begins with an official notice of their marriage in a newspaper.

== Characters ==
The characters in this work are as follows:

- Su Huaiqin: the wife and the main character. Su Huaiqin is a woman born into a fatherless household in a feudal family structure. She was a xiaojie, (a person of low standing), before she married Xu Chongxian.
- Xu Chongxian:the husband of the main character. Xu Chongxian lives in a large feudal family, and is called Shaoye, (young master), by the family servants.
- Su Yushu: Huaiqin's mother. Su Yushu is a devoted mother who loves her daughter, but unfortunately is forced to arrange a bad marriage that destroys her daughter’s happiness.
- Xu Zhengfu: Chongxian's father
- Xu Taitai: Chongxian's mother
- Xu Xingying: Chongxian's younger sister. Xu Xingying is a disagreeable person with an unpleasant appearance. She is depicted as a mean girl and often teases Huaiqin, her sister-in-law. She has a great affection for her brother which could be the motivation for her dislike of her sister-in-law.
