= Post 70s Generation =

Chinese demographic cohort born in the 1970s

Post-70s Generation is a term used in Chinese literary criticism to describe a group of writers in contemporary Chinese literature who were born in the 1970s. In some critical writing, these authors have also been described as the post-Cultural Revolution generation or the post-Mao generation, because they came of age after Mao Zedong's death.

== Background ==
The term first appeared in 1996 in the Shanghai literary magazine Fiction World (小说界), which opened a column for young writers born after 1970, then still in their early twenties. It was later adopted more widely in Chinese literary criticism during the late 1990s and early 21st century, before attention shifted to the emerging post-80s generation.

Writers and cultural figures sometimes associated with the post-70s generation include Mian Mian, Wei Hui, Zhou Jieru, Yilin Zhong, Shen Haobo, Ding Tian, Wang Ai, Wei Wei, Dai Lai, Li Shijiang, Jin Renshun, Zhu Wenying, Wu Ang, Yin Lichuan, Sheng Keyi, Ma Yi, Zhao Bo, Jia Zhangke, Xiaolu Guo, and Xie Youshun.

Groups or trends sometimes linked to the post-70s generation include beauty writers, the lower body poets, and the Sixth Generation of filmmakers.

== Beauty writers ==
In 2000, the term beauty writers became widely discussed in the Chinese media. After Wei Hui published her novel Shanghai Baby in 1999, the Shanghai writer Mian Mian published an essay titled Wei Hui Has Not Plagiarized My Work, in which she commented on similarities between Wei Hui's fiction and her own writing.

The dispute attracted significant media attention and developed into a public controversy involving Wei Hui, Mian Mian, and other writers associated with the post-70s generation, including Zhou Jieru, Yilin Zhong, and Wei Wei. Newspapers and online forums reported extensively on the debate from different perspectives, and the episode contributed to the public visibility of so-called beauty writing.

The controversy also helped bring attention to Shanghai Baby, which became a bestseller in China and was later translated abroad. The novel was later banned in China on the grounds of obscenity. Following this period, the label beauty writers gradually declined in prominence.

== Lower Body Poets ==
The post-70s generation has also been associated with the lower body poets. In 2006, a public dispute took place between Shen Haobo, a poet linked to the lower body group, and the writer Han Han. Han Han argued that modern poetry and modern poets no longer had a meaningful role, a view that drew criticism from poets associated with the movement. Shen Haobo responded in a series of public remarks and satirical verses directed at Han Han.

The controversy has been cited as an example of the cultural and literary differences often drawn between the post-70s and post-80s generations.

== Sixth Generation ==
Jia Zhangke, born in 1970, is sometimes identified as a representative film director of the post-70s generation. His film A Touch of Sin won the award for Best Screenplay at the 2013 Cannes Film Festival. Although the film was released in a number of overseas markets, it did not receive a normal theatrical release in mainland China. Jia later said that the situation left him deeply disappointed.
