= Liaotianbao =

Chinese social media application

- Developer(s): Beijing Kuairu Technology
- Initial release: 15 January 2019; 6 years ago
- Stable release: 1.2.5 / May 10, 2019; 5 years ago
- Operating system: iOS, Android
- Size: ≈125.8 MB (iOS)
- Available in: Chinese
- Type: Social media
- License: Proprietary
- Website: www.zidanduanxin.com(China)

Liaotianbao (Chinese: 聊天宝; pinyin: Liáotiānbǎo), formerly known as Bullet Messenger (Chinese: 子弹短信; pinyin: Zǐdàn Duǎnxìn), is a Chinese social media application developed by Beijing Kuairu Technology company. It was released by Luo Yonghao the CEO of Smartisan company on August 20, 2018. The slogan of Liaotianbao is that "We want to talk to the world". Originally, the logo was bullet and now the logo of the software is a Sycee with "smiling faces". It allows to send voice and text messages, voice and video calls, shopping, red envelope, and play mini-games etcetera. The service requires users to register by phone number (Phone number can be any country). User can log in not only with their mobile phones, but also with computer websites. Indeed, the essential feature is that users can earn virtual currency through chatting, shopping, games, etcetera and those virtual currency can be converted into cash by pro rata.

== History ==
=== Bullet Messenger ===
On August 20, 2019, Bullet Messenger was released by Beijing Kuairu Technology Team and Luo Yonghao the CEO of Smartisan company and developed by Techcrunch. Smartisan company was directly broadcasting the entire event.

From August 23 to August 26, 2019, Bullet Messenger topped the free social networking applications. After released, until August 30, 400 million users have registered it. Far more than any other online social media.

On August 28, 2018, Bullet Messenger operator Beijing Kuairu Technology announced the completion of first round financing of 150 million RMB ($22 million).

Luo Yonghao, chief executive of popular smartisan, said on his microblog that he plans to spend about 1 billion yuan over the next six months to add 100 million users.

=== Liaotianbao ===
On January 15, 2019, it was officially released and renamed Liaotianbao. In addition to social communication, it also updated the circle of acquaintances. Then, it also released version 1.0 of Liaotianbao and the new version is available in the Apple App Store and Android App Store.

On March 5, 2019, the Liaotianbao team announced the team disbanded. Only about 30 people remained out of more than 200.

== Features ==
=== Messaging ===
Liaotianbao offers SMS, voice calls, video calls and meetings, games, photos and video sharing, and location sharing. Liao supports different forms of instant messaging, including text messages, voice messages and SMS which users can send text messages to phone number on the home page. Liaotianbao users can also use group meeting which is convenient for business people. Indeed, group owners can keep other group members from sending messages. If group leader are going to hold a presentation in a group meeting and want attendees to focus on the speaker; this feature may be helpful if group leader want to peace the other group members down in a heated discussion.

==== Text messages ====
The critical feature of Liaotianbao is to automatically convert a voice message into a text message. For example, when you press talking key, the built-in voice recognition system will transform a voice message into a text message. If the user recognises that the translation system is not accurate, the user can modify the text message by themselves. When users are less convenient, this feature can avoid unclear voice. It is very convenient and breaks down the old modes of chat tools. Moreover, it also can recognise accents to minimise errors of contents. For instance, the public and noisy places. Then users are likely to use it commonly.

==== Voice messages ====
Instead of opening up main chat windows, it can respond to all the messages directly from the main chat interface. It can make user very convenient chat with many people and speed up the efficiency of reply such as customer service staffs. More important, other social media like WeChat, Tencent QQ must hear from messages again if users are not catch the message. However, Liaotianbao can repeat any part of the voice messages. Currently, Liaotianbao only transcribes Chinese words and does not provide an English translation of voice messages.

=== Explore ===
With version 1.1.1 updates,"Explore" feature is occurred. The "Explore" function mainly includes ‘topic square’, ‘cash cow’, ‘novel’ and 'reading'. In 'topic square', it displays popular photos and hot topics, etcetera. In 'novel' and 'reading', it displays numerous novels and books. Moreover, Users can access all aspects of the news like Sina Weibo.

=== Earn money ===
The main attraction of the social media is clarity and simplicity, "money". Users can earn virtual currency through chatting, inviting friends and play games etcetera. One of the most representative money-making games is the "Money Tree". The picture on the right side is the game page of "Money Tree". It has five small functions, props, pruning, pest control, watering, harvesting. "Pops", users can buy all kinds of props, fertilisers, trick tools in the store. "Pruning", users can trim your cash cow regularly and have 400 to 500 experiences a day to upgrade the cash cow. The higher the tree level, the more virtual currency you get. "Deworming", your friends can put bugs in your money tree. If you don't log in for a long time, there will be one or two bugs on your money tree. "Watering", users water regularly to increase the yield of cash cow. "Harvest", each level of the cash cow harvest time is different, basically is also a three hours or four hours harvest. If user forget to harvest, some of your "gold" will be stolen by friends. According to the company, users who successfully invite 1,000 friends to join LiaoTianbao will receive a cash rebate of 1,500 yuan, about US$22. However, it has not provided details on whether the digital coins can be exchanged for cash, as well as how the users can cash out the rewards.

=== Payment method ===
On August 25, 2019, Liaotianbao team announced the addition of Alipay payment function. When user want to withdraw red envelopes from friends and family or withdraw virtual currency from the game, the withdraw deposit service will automatically jump to the page of Alipay when you click on withdraw.

== Security ==
Two months after the release of Bullet Messenger, it was censured for its security features and for spreading vulgar and pornographic content. It was forced to be removed from the iOS app store for a while. And this app allows people to send messages to all users even if they are not your friends. In addition, this is a system vulnerability that criminals can send junk mail to users. This can lead to user information being leaked. Moreover, due to the insufficient security performance of the system, a large number of virtual currencies are converted into cash due to system vulnerabilities.

== Competition ==
Liaotianbao competes with a number of China-based messaging services, such as WeChat (about one billion active users in 2018), Tencent QQ (about 0.8 billion active users in 2018).
