= Xu Lai =

Xu Lai may refer to:

- Xu Lai (actress) (1909–1973), actress and secret agent
- Qian Liexian or Xu Lai, journalist and blogger
