= Triple Door =

Triple Door may refer to:

- Triple Door (novel), a novel by Chinese writer Han Han
- The Triple Door, a dinner theater, lounge and music venue in Seattle, Washington
