= Bullog.cn =

Chinese blogging website

bullog.cn (牛博网)
- Website type: blogging website
- Available in: Chinese
- Founder: Luo Yonghao
- Website: http://www.bullog.cn

Bullog.cn (Chinese: 牛博网) was a Chinese-language blogging website, created by Chinese internet celebrity Luo Yonghao. Before it was shut down, it was considered to be one of the most liberal blog portals in Chinese cyberspace.

== History ==
Bullog.cn was founded by Luo Yonghao in 2006, because of his dissatisfaction with the censorship of the major blog portals like sina.com, sohu.com. The Chinese name, 牛博网, which literally means "Bull Blog Net", appears to be a word play on the word "Blog", since Bull means strong and excellent in colloquial Chinese.

Bullog.cn started by inviting bloggers whom Luo Yonghao personally liked, who turned out to have a strong preference for liberal and scientific points of view. Both were controversial stances in China, and both caused troubles inside and outside the website.

On October 19, 2007, Bullog.cn was shut down, supposedly due to the 17th National Congress of the Chinese Communist Party. It was re-opened in April 2008. Luo started an international version of the website, bullogger.com, during that period.

In May 2008, after the Wenchuan earthquake, Luo started a fund raising campaign in Bullog.cn, and delivered the donations to the refugees with the Bullog team and other volunteers.

On January 9, 2009, Bullog.cn was shut down again, reportedly due to claims by the Chinese government that it hosted "harmful comments on current affairs". A successor site, bullogger.com, is now hosted overseas.

== Notable bloggers ==
- Fang Zhouzi
- Han Han
- Li Yinhe
- Steven N. S. Cheung
- Ai Weiwei
- Xu Lai
