= House of Memories =

House of Memories, or variants, may refer to:

== Books ==
- In the House of Memories, a 1946 book by Jens Christian Bay
- House of Memories, a romance novel by Margaret Way 1983
- My House of Memories, autobiography by Merle Haggard
- The House of Memory – A Novel of Shanghai, by Nicholas R. Clifford (see List of fiction set in Shanghai)
- The House of Memory: Stories by Jewish Women Writers of Latin America, anthology ed. Marjorie Agosín (1999) Bárbara Mujica (writer), Luisa Futoransky and others

== Film and TV ==
- House of Memories (film) (Paromitar Ek Din), a 2000 Indian Bengali drama film
- La casa del recuerdo (The House of Memory), a 1940 Argentine film by Luis Saslavsky
- "House of Memories", episode of Wynonna Earp (TV series)

== Music ==
- "House of Memories" (song), a song by Panic! at the Disco from Death of a Bachelor
- "House of Memories", a song by Merle Haggard from the 1967 album I'm a Lonesome Fugitive
- "House of Memories (Lindsay's Song)", a song by Ten Shekel Shirt from Much
- My House of Memories, a recording of Merle Haggard's autobiography (see Grammy Award for Best Spoken Word Album)
