= Kong Qingdong =

Chinese academic and author

- 孔庆东
- Born: September 22, 1964 (age 62); Harbin, China
- Other name: "Kong the Monk"
- Education: PhD in Chinese Literature and Language
- Alma mater: Peking University
- Occupation: Professor of Chinese studies
- Employer: Peking University
- Known for: Controversial social commentary
- Website: blog.sina.com.cn/u/1198367585 (in Chinese)

Kong Qingdong
- Simplified Chinese: 孔庆东
- Traditional Chinese: 孔慶東
Transcriptions
Standard Mandarin
- Hanyu Pinyin: Kǒng Qìngdōng
- IPA: [kʰʊ̀ŋ tɕʰîŋtʊ́ŋ]

Alternative Chinese name
- Chinese: 孔和尚
- Literal meaning: Kong the Monk
Transcriptions
Standard Mandarin
- Hanyu Pinyin: Kǒng Héshàng

Kong Qingdong (born September 22, 1964) is a Chinese academic, author, talk show host, and social commentator. Kong is a prominent and controversial Chinese media figure, known for his vulgar and often brusque critiques on political issues and various individuals and groups. Kong has often been portrayed in the media as a figure of the Chinese New Left, calling for a reversal of the reform and opening up and a return to Mao-style policies.

== Biography ==
Kong was born to a worker's family during the Cultural Revolution era, and was devoted to studying Lu Xun early in his academic career. He proclaims himself as a 73rd generation descendant of Confucius.

Kong first achieved fame as the author of various books describing his graduate student life in Peking University, in which the self-described "Drunkard of Peking University" commentated on many Chinese social issues. An avid reader and researcher of Chinese wuxia fiction, Kong briefly lectured on wuxia author Jin Yong on CCTV's Lecture Room series, as well as giving a talk on the Chinese essayist and language reformer Lu Xun on the same series. After he was named a professor of Chinese studies by Peking University, Kong began publishing essays in which he espoused Chinese nationalism and communist orthodoxy. Kong has praised the North Korean government on various occasions, claiming that the Koreans "would surely die off", if not for "the great leader (Kim Jong-il) and his Workers' Party". Additionally, Kong has organized study groups on Juche, the official ideology in North Korea, at Peking University; some sources, such as Southern Metropolis Daily, accuse the group of providing intelligence to North Korea.

In the 2000s, Kong spent 2 years in South Korea, teaching at the Ewha Womans University.

Kong hosts a talk show program and his microblog has a large following.

=== Involvement in the Tiananmen Square Protest ===
In 1989, after April 25, Kong Qingdong participated in the Tiananmen Square protests and was elected as the fourth convener of the Peking University Students' Movement Preparatory Committee. A few days later, he was replaced after other student leaders became dissatisfied with his obedience to the university party committee.

After the Tiananmen Square protests, he was purged, stripped of his qualification to pursue a doctorate, and in 1990 was assigned to teach at Beijing No. 2 Middle School. A few years later, he returned to Peking University to continue his studies, obtaining his Ph.D. in 1996 and remaining there as a faculty member.

On May 23, 2014, a person claiming to have been a "Central Guard Regiment officer" involved in the suppression of the Tiananmen Square protests left a comment on Kong Qingdong's Sina Weibo page, stating that the government's actions at the time were legitimate measures to maintain social stability. Kong Qingdong immediately responded: "Nonsense, there was no riot at all. It was you who opened fire and massacred the people, then turned around and framed them! Can you name a single student who took part in a riot?" He added, "You're speaking without knowing the facts — you've wronged the hundreds of patriotic civilians who were slaughtered, and even those few PLA soldiers who died unjustly."

Kong also improvised further revelations about the events at the time, saying things such as: "The people who burned army vehicles were unidentified; students even handed over some vandals to the police," "By late April, American influence had already infiltrated," "Some student leaders had been bought off by the U.S. and were eager to see the massacre happen," "Certain officials falsified military reports and exaggerated the situation; in fact, by late May, the movement was already in decline," "Agents tried to smear Mao Zedong's portrait with ink to frame the students, but the students caught them on the spot and turned them over to the police," and "On May 20, Peking University students and Beijing citizens bravely resisted, blocking the main PLA field forces outside the Third and Fourth Ring Roads."

In June of the same year, Kong Qingdong accepted an on-site interview with journalists, which was recorded and first published by Duowei News. In the interview, as a participant in the Tiananmen Square protests, Kong commented on several pro-democracy figures such as Feng Congde, Wang Dan, Chai Ling, and Wu'er Kaixi, while also revealing little-known details about the incident. The video interview, first released by Duowei, drew significant public attention and analysis. Major news outlets such as the Hong Kong Economic Times also reported on it.

=== Involvement with the Confucius Peace Prize ===
Kong Qingdong has been involved in the Confucius Peace Prize, a Chinese prize set up in response to Nobel Peace Prize, which was awarded to the Chinese dissident Liu Xiaobo amid China's protest. Kong claims that the prize, which was awarded to Lien Chan and Vladimir Putin in its first two years (none of whom accepted it), accurately reflects Confucius' vision of peace.

== Political views ==
Kong, in addition to being described as a nationalist, has also been described as a figure of the Chinese New Left, a political faction that believes China's economic reforms have gone too far and the country needs to revert to a more socialist and egalitarian society with heavy state control. He was a supporter of quasi-Maoist political figure Bo Xilai prior to and after the politician's disgrace. He has criticized the Chinese government, calling it "shameless", ostensibly for its pursuit of capitalist-style policies.

== Controversies ==
Kong is notorious for numerous forthright and expletive-ridden rants against a number of groups and individuals, and his polarizing views have frequently generated controversy, but have also rallied supporters.

=== Personal attacks ===
Kong once called former United States Secretary of State Hillary Clinton a "bitch", and performing artist Jiang Kun a xiasanlan (Chinese: 下三滥), a derogatory term for "three dirty professions" of prostitution, beggars, and street artists).

=== Attacks on media ===
Kong has repeatedly criticized China's liberal media, particularly Southern Chinese journals and newspapers, as "hanjian media". Kong has also called CCTV "inhuman".

In November 2011, Southern Weekly, described as a "beachhead" for China's liberal media, reached out to Kong for an interview. Rejecting the request, Kong published on his microblog that "the treasonous newspaper has harassed me once again by asking to interview me"; Kong answered the request with a Chinese expression of profanity using the word mom three times (Chinese: "去你妈的！滚你妈的！操你妈的！"; lit. 'Go to your mom! Roll to your mom! Fuck your mom!'). The use of profanity drew Kong considerable criticism online, to the point of calling for his resignation, although he also received widespread support, with some online straw polls turning out in favor of Kong. Commentators pointed out that Kong's popularity is a symptom of the widespread resentment of the elite liberal media, which often run editorials critical of poor people and make economic arguments to justify the increasing wealth gap.

Kong himself asserted he used the expletives deliberately to "lure out" his enemies in the liberal Chinese media, having predicted that they would respond to him vehemently with what he called "counterrevolutionary encirclement." Some eighty media outlets reportedly criticized Kong for his remarks. Following the barrage of negative media attention, Kong then directly criticized the state-run Xinhua News Agency, saying that it was no longer under the control of the Party's Central Committee but taking orders from Guangdong party chief Wang Yang, seen as the representative of China's political 'right.' The journalist in question later defended Kong, claiming that the profanity is "a later embellishment when Kong published his microblog post". Overseas media speculated that Kong's remarks was merely part of a much larger battle between the political left and right in China. His singling out of Wang Yang by name was cited as evidence of the intensifying struggle for China's future political direction.

=== Attack on journalist ===
In November 2008, Qian Liexian (pen name of Xu Lai), a journalist at New Beijing, a newspaper affiliated with Southern Daily at the time, alleged in his blog that Kong Qingdong has been interrogated by the Beijing police for spying for North Korea. A few months later, in February 2009, Qian was assaulted and stabbed by Yang Chun, a personal assistant of Kong Qingdong, who accused Qian of offending "a friend". Southern Metropolis Daily, another newspaper affiliated with Southern Daily, criticized Kong Qingdong's involvement in the affairs.

=== Attacks on government ===
Kong has criticized the Shenzhen municipal government as "reactionary", and the Chinese government "shameless."

=== Support for Bo Xilai ===
In March 2012, upon the dismissal of Bo Xilai, a renowned leftist figure in China, Kong showered Bo with praise on his talk show, calling Bo a "mob-fighting hero." Kong called Bo's dismissal by the Chinese authorities "a counterrevolutionary coup." Kong also took a moment to "criticize the people, the masses... what have you done to construct socialism? What have you done for Chongqing, for China? If you are a supporter of Bo Xilai, then what have you done to support Bo Xilai? What have you done to save the country from sinking into the abyss of capitalism? Don't just sit there waiting for a lecture from professor Kong and lament the state of affairs, this world isn't just for heroes to save!"

=== North Korea ===
Kong has expressed admiration for the North Korean Juche ideology, in addition to its late leader Kim Jong-il.

=== Western culture ===
Kong is critical of Western culture. He has supported a boycott of the film Kung Fu Panda 2, calling it an instrument of cultural invasion by the West. After the Apple Inc. co-founder and CEO Steve Jobs died in 2011, Kong remarked that "the more people like Steve Jobs die, the better".

=== Anti-Rightist Movement ===
In 2007, the liberal writer Zhang Yihe (章诒和, daughter of Zhang Bojun, a notable Chinese intellectual and victim of Mao Zedong's Anti-Rightist Movement) published the now banned Past Histories of Peking Opera Stars, in which she criticized the Anti-Rightist Movement and affirmed that she "will not give up the defense of my basic civil rights, because it affects the dignity and conscience of a person". Kong fiercely attacked Zhang in a lecture, referring to Zhang's social class as "the enemy of our government." Kong further defended the Anti-Rightist Movement and addressed to the "Old rightists" that "you (the rightists) think that you are proper heroes, so why are you asking the Communist Party for vindication? ... our cases have been overturned after the reforms began, but why do the big rightists want to demand hundreds more times in compensation from the people?"

=== Hong Kong ===
In January 2012, Kong commented on a viral video on his talk show. In the video, a Mainland Chinese mother on a Hong Kong MTR train engaged in an argument with a fellow passenger, a native Hong Konger who tried to stop her young child from eating on the train. Kong lashed out on the Hong Kong passenger, criticizing the man's use of Cantonese (as opposed to the Mandarin used in Mainland China) and calling him a "colonial elitist" and a "bastard." He went on to make sweeping remarks about Hong Kong people in general, saying multiple times that "many Hong Kongers" are "bastards," and "dogs."

Kong further claimed that the Hong Kong people are "willing dogs of the British ... To this day they think that they are dogs, not people." Kong stated that in their purported "colonial mentality", Hong Kong people are "dogs in front of the British, but wolves in front of the Chinese", comparing them to Korean and Taiwanese supporters of the Imperial Japanese Army during World War II. Kong pointed out that the reaction on the MTR would not have been the same had a white person, e.g., a Briton or an American, been in the same situation, rather than a person from Mainland Chinese. Kong asserted that Hong Kong had some "positive traits", one of which is rule of law, which was enforced only because "the British spanked them [Hong Kongers]" if they broke the law; and, in response to Hong Kong's society, Kong said of Hong Kong people: "your society's order is maintained by law, which means that you have no self-restraint, which means that you are a vile (賤 [jiàn]) people". The remarks circulated widely on social media sites in Hong Kong and became the focus of controversy and protests in the territory in early 2012, causing further tensions in what were already strained Mainland Chinese-Hong Kong relations. Two candidates of the 2012 Hong Kong Chief Executive election, Leung Chun-Ying and Henry Tang, criticized Kong. Reactions were mixed in Mainland China to Kong's remarks. Some prominent Chinese academics came out to criticize Kong, but he also received support on the internet.

Several days later, Kong fired back at the criticism leveled at him, saying that the media and internet users were on a witch hunt to "cherry pick" his words in order to attack him, asserting that he did not mean to say that Hong Kong people are dogs, or that non-Mandarin Chinese-speakers are dogs. He also said that he was confident the "majority of Hong Kongers" were not critical of him and that the internet backlash to be part of a well-executed conspiracy by fringe activists to silence him. In his defence, he stated that "there are good people and bad people everywhere; there are dogs everywhere. Some Beijing people are dogs."

=== Singapore ===
Kong has called a female Singaporean journalist "a whore", in addition to criticizing Singaporeans as "completely ignorant". Kong was quoted as saying "I've been to Singapore. Those people from Singapore... they basically don't know anything."

=== Taiwanese election ===
On 28 January 2012, Kong asserted on a Chinese television program that the 2012 presidential election in Taiwan is "fake democracy" and is "comparable to a soap opera." He remarked that he did not see "much progress" in Taiwan during the four years of Ma Ying-jeou's term in Taiwan, and that Ma's winning of six million votes was not impressive, "not even half the population of Beijing." Kong said that Ma's razor-thin margin of victory over his rival Tsai Ing-wen was comparable to the population of Zhongguancun, a neighbourhood of Beijing, and that it still reflected a deeply divided Taiwanese society. Both the incumbent Kuomintang and the Democratic Progressive Party have rebuked Kong's remarks.

=== Michelle Obama ===
In early 2014, during the U.S. First Lady Michelle Obama's state visit to China, Kong alleged on his Sina Weibo account that Michelle Obama was successfully confronted and rebuked by a Peking University student while giving a speech supporting free speech. The student supposedly asked Michelle Obama, "is America's strength a result of the U.S. secret services listening to the voices of its citizens? Could you tell me in America what the difference is between 'listening to' and 'listening in'?" in a reference to the NSA spying scandal. Kong further described Michelle Obama's response as “dumbfounded by the question, Michelle Obama eventually replied that she was not there to talk about politics." After Kong had made his allegations, reporters and students present at Michelle Obama's speech denied that the confrontation took place. Kong was subsequently widely panned for having fabricated the entire story, which critics have noted can subject him to arrest under the same criteria with which the police had arrested hundreds of people accused of spreading rumors online in mid-2013. In response, Kong simply called the critics "dogs of America" and "traitors to China."

=== "Is Kong Qingdong a savage" incident ===
Wu Xiaoping (吴晓平), host with Nanjing Television, analyzed a case surrounding Kong Qingdong on the former's show Tingwo Shaoshao (听我韶韶), with the provocative title "Kong Qingdong: Is he a jiàoshòu (教授, "professor") or yěshòu (野兽 "savage")." Kong, insulted that he was called a "savage", responded by attempting to sue Wu for libel in a Beijing court, seeking damages of 200,000 yuan, accusing Wu of tarnishing his reputation. However, the Beijing court ruled against Kong upon first review, stating that the news media has an interest in the "public good" since restricting news commentary to use only "civilized" language would unduly restrict for what is permissible on air and limit "sharp commentary" used to make valid points.
