= List of films set in Shanghai =

, List of films set wholly or partially in Shanghai.

Title	Year released	Director	Starring	Notes
Shanghai Express	1932		Marlene Dietrich	
Charlie Chan in Shanghai	1935	James Tinling	Warner Oland Keye Luke Irene Hervey	In the Charlie Chan film series.
The Leathernecks Have Landed	1936			
Daughter of Shanghai	1937	Robert Florey	Anna Mae Wong Charles Bickford Buster Crabbe	Phillip Ahn who plays "Kim Lee" Was Anna Mae Wong's childhood friend. This is Natalie Schaefer's (Gilligan's Island) movie debut
Think Fast, Mr. Moto	1937	Norman Foster (director)	Peter Lorre	
Le Drame de Shanghaï	1938	Georg Wilhelm Pabst		Filmed in France and Saigon
Shadows Over Shanghai	1938	Charles Lamont	James Dunn, Ralph Morgan Robert Barrat	
The Shanghai Gesture	1941	Josef von Sternberg		
The Lady from Shanghai	1947	Orson Welles	Rita Hayworth, Orson Welles	Not set wholly or partially in Shanghai
The Shanghai Story	1954	Frank Lloyd	Ruth Roman, Edmond O'Brien,Richard Jaeckel	
Fist of Fury	1972		Bruce Lee	
Shanghai 13	1984		Andy Lau	
Indiana Jones and the Temple of Doom	1984		Harrison Ford	Begins in fictional Club Obi-Wan in Shanghai
Shanghai Surprise	1986		Madonna, Sean Penn	
Empire of the Sun	1987	Steven Spielberg		
Shanghai 1920	1991		John Lone, Adrian Pasdar	
God of Gamblers III: Back to Shanghai	1991		Stephen Chow	
Center Stage	1991	Stanley Kwan		
Fist of Legend	1994		Jet Li	Remake of Fist of Fury
Tian Di	1994		Andy Lau	
The Phantom Lover	1995		Leslie Cheung, Jacklyn Wu	
Shanghai Triad	1995	Zhang Yimou		
A Romance in Shanghai	1996		Fann Wong	
Shanghai Grand	1996		Andy Lau, Leslie Cheung, Ning Jing	
Temptress Moon	1996	Chen Kaige	Leslie Cheung and Gong Li	Also known as Feng yue
Armageddon	1998	Michael Bay		
Eighteen Springs	1998	Ann Hui On-wah		Also known as Bansheng yuan
Flowers of Shanghai	1998	Hou Hsiao-hsien		Also known as Haishang hua
Shanghai Noon	2000		Jackie Chan, Owen Wilson	
Suzhou River	2000	Lou Ye		Also known as Suzhou he
Shanghai Panic	2002	Andrew Y-S Cheng		Chinese title, Wo men hai pa
Code 46	2003	Michael Winterbottom	Tim Robbins	
Purple Butterfly	2003	Lou Ye	Zhang Ziyi	Chinese title, Zi hudie
Shanghai Knights	2003		Jackie Chan, Owen Wilson	Sequel to Shanghai Noon
Lara Croft Tomb Raider: The Cradle of Life	2003			One scene set in Shanghai, but was shot on a set
Godzilla: Final Wars	2004			
Kung Fu Hustle	2004	Stephen Chow		Chinese title,Gongfu
Everlasting Regret	2005	Stanley Kwan		
The White Countess	2005		Ralph Fiennes, Natasha Richardson	
Fearless	2006	Ronny Yu	Jet Li	
Perhaps Love	2005	Peter Chan		
Mission: Impossible III	2006		Tom Cruise	
The Postmodern Life of My Aunt	2006	Ann Hui		
The Painted Veil	2006		Edward Norton, Naomi Watts	
Ultraviolet	2006		Milla Jovovich	Partially shot in Shanghai
Fantastic Four: Rise of the Silver Surfer	2007			Features the Oriental Pearl Tower
Lust, Caution	2007	Ang Lee		Based on the novella by Eileen Chang
The Longest Night in Shanghai	2007		Masahiro Motoki, Zhao Wei	
Shanghai Kiss	2007		Ken Leung, Hayden Panettiere	
Transformers: Revenge of the Fallen	2009			
Legend of the Fist: The Return of Chen Zhen	2010		Donnie Yen, Shu Qi, Anthony Wong	
Shanghai	2010		Chow Yun-fat, John Cusack, Gong Li, Ken Watanabe	
Snow Flower and the Secret Fan	2010	Wayne Wang	Li Bingbing, Jun Ji-hyun	Based on the novel by Lisa See, many scenes filmed at the Peninsula Shainghai on the Bund
The Last Tycoon	2012		Chow Yun-fat, Sammo Hung, Francis Ng	
Shanghai Calling	2012		Daniel Henney	
Looper	2012		Bruce Willis, Joseph Gordon-Levitt, Emily Blunt	
Skyfall	2012		Daniel Craig	23rd James Bond film
Penguins of Madagascar	2014			
Her	2014			
Geostorm	2017			
How Long Will I Love U	2018	Su Lun	Lei Jiayin, Tong Liya	
The Wandering Earth	2019	Frant Gwo	Wu Jing, Qu Chuxiao, Li Guangjie, Ng Man-tat, Zhao Jinmai, Qu Jingjing	
Wish Dragon	2021		Jackie Chan, Natasha Liu Bordizzo, Jimmy O. Yang	
Rally Road Racers	2023	Ross Venokur	Jimmy O. Yang, J. K. Simmons, Chloe Bennet, Lisa Lu, Sharon Horgan, Catherine Tate, John Cleese	

== See also ==
- List of films based on location
- List of films set in Hong Kong
- List of films set in Macau
- List of fiction set in Shanghai
