= FCACA =

FCACA is a motorsport brand from China.

Full Name:	FCACA World Rally Team
Base:	Shanghai, PRC
Team Owner:	Simple Chen
Team Principal:	Yongyong Pan
Technical director:	Hans Luo

== FCACA World Rally Team ==
=== About FCACA World Rally Team ===
Belonging to the brand FCACA, the FCACA World Rally Team was set up in 2008 to promote Chinese motorsports and compete in motorsport events at an international level.

Team FCACA is the only Shanghai team to have competed in Group N in the China Rally Championship (CRC). In the second year in the CRC competition, FCACA became the runner-up in the team's championship of season 2009 (only one point behind the champion team).

In 2010, with Finnish Champion Jari Ketomaa and Chinese Champion Rui Wang, Team FCACA stepped forward to the international stage to compete in the SWRC and PWRC.

2010 Drivers:	Jari Ketomaa (FIN) (SWRC)
	Wang Rui (CHN) (PWRC)
2010 Co-drivers:	Mika Stenberg (FIN) (SWRC)
	Pan Hongyu (CHN) (PWRC)
2010 Rally Car:	Ford Fiesta S2000
	Subaru Impreza WRX STi
Tyres:	Pirelli

=== 2010 Calendar ===
Date	Rally	Series
1–3 April 2010	Jordan Rally	SWRC & PWRC
7–9 May 2010	Rally New Zealand	SWRC & PWRC
28–30 May 2010	Vodafone Rally de Portugal	SWRC
29–31 July 2010	Neste Oil Rally Finland	SWRC & PWRC
10–12 September 2010	Rally Japan	SWRC & PWRC
30 September – 3 October 2010	Rallye de France	SWRC & PWRC
5–7 November 2010	Rally China	Asia Pacific Rally Championship
11–14 November 2010	Rally of Great Britain	SWRC & PWRC

=== 2010 Events History ===
Date	Event	Result
1 – 3 April	WRC Jordan Rally	Team: 5th in WRC Cup; Driver: 6th in SWRC (Jari Ketomaa); 6th in PWRC (Wang Rui)

=== 2009 Events History ===
Date	Event	Result
24 – 26 Feb	Training in Norway	
8 – 10 May	APRC Rally Queensland (Gravel)	7th overall APRC (Wang Rui); Car: EVO 9
13 – 15 Jun	CRC Rally Jiangning (Gravel)	Team: 5th overall Driver: 6th overall, 3rd Chinese (Han Han); Car: Subaru Impreza WRX STi
9 – 11 Jul	CRC Rally Beijing (Tarmac)	Team: 4th overall Driver: 4th overall (Tony Green); 6th overall, 1st Chinese (Han Han); Car: Subaru Impreza WRX STi
29 – 31 Aug	CRC Rally Fogang (Tarmac)	Team: 4th overall Driver: 6th overall,2nd Chinese (Han Han); Car: Subaru Impreza WRX STi
4 – 6 Sep	PWRC Rally Australia (Gravel)	23rd overall WRC (Han Han); Car: EVO 9
13 – 15 Nov	CRC Rally Longyou (Gravel)	Team: 1st overall Driver: 2nd overall (Jari Ketomaa); 4th overall, 2nd Chinese (Han Han); Car: Subaru Impreza WRX STi
18 – 20 Dec	CRC Rally Shaowu (Gravel)	Team: 1st overall Driver: 1st overall (Jari Ketomaa); 5th overall, 1st Chinese (Han Han); Car: Subaru Impreza WRX STi

=== 2008 Events History ===
Date	Event	Result
27 Feb	Launch of Team FCACA	
21 Apr	First run of testing	
19 May	First Media Day	
30 May – 1 Jun	CRC Rally Shanghai (Tarmac)	Team: 2nd Overall; Driver: 2nd overall (Tony Green); 6th overall, 2nd Chinese (Men Guangyuan); Car: Subaru Impreza WRX STi
28 – 31 Aug	PWRC Rally New Zealand (Gravel)	DNF
5 – 7 Sep	CRC Rally Mohe (Gravel)	Driver: 3rd overall (Tony Green); Car: Subaru Impreza WRX ST
26 – 28 Sep	CRC Rally Changbaishan (Gravel)	Team: 3rd Overall; Driver: 5th overall (Tony Green); 7th overall, 3rd Chinese (Men Guangyuan); Car: Subaru Impreza WRX STi
7 – 9 Nov	CRC Rally Longyou (Gravel)	DNF
5 – 7 Dec	CRC Rally Shaowu (Gravel)	Team: 2nd Overall; Driver: 2nd overall (Tony Green); Car: Subaru Impreza WRX STi

=== China Rally Championship Career ===
Debut: 2008 Rally Shanghai Latest Rally: 2009 Rally Shaowu Season 2009 Team Standing: 2nd in Group N Season 2008 Team Standing: 4th in Group N Best Result: 2009 Rally Shaowu, Team Champion and Driver's Champion

=== Production World Rally Championship Career ===
Debut: 2008 Rally New Zealand Latest Rally: 2009 Rally Australia Best Result: 2009 Rally Australia, 23rd overall WRC

== Other Events ==
2007 Sponsor UK driver Matthew Marsh to compete in 24 Hours of Le Mans Racing Car: Ferrari F430 GT Technical Support: Ferrari

2008 Sponsor Chinese driver Luo Ding to compete in Transsyberia Racing Car: Porsche Cayenne S Transsyberia Technical Support: Porsche
