= Party (magazine) =

2010 Chinese literary magazine by Han Han

- Editor: Han Han
- Categories: Literary Magazine
- Frequency: Bimonthly
- First issue: July 6, 2010
- Country: China
- Language: Chinese

Party (Chinese: 独唱团, literally means "the solo choir/chorus") was a literary magazine created and edited by Han Han. Since its launch on July 6, 2010, the first issue has sold at least 1.5 million copies and at one point, reached the top position on Amazon China. The original name of the magazine was Renaissance, which was replaced by Party due to the censorship.

== History ==
- May 1, 2009 – Han Han wrote an article on his blog to announce the creation of a new magazine, requesting for articles.
- July 6, 2010 – Party (first issue) was officially launched.
- July 28, 2010 – The millionth copy of the first issue entered circulation.
- December 27, 2010 – The magazine ended circulation.

== Editors ==
- Han Han – Founder and Editor
- Ma Yimu – Executive Editor

== Notable contributors ==
- Zhou Yunpeng
- Kevin Tsai
- Ai Weiwei
- Pang Ho-cheung
