= Shen Haobo =

Chinese poet and publisher (born 1976)

- Born: 1976 (age 49–50) Taixing, China
- Occupation: Poet, Publisher
- Education: BA
- Alma mater: Beijing Normal University
- Period: 1996–present
- Genre: poem

Shen Haobo (Chinese: 沈浩波; pinyin: Shěn Hàobō) is a Chinese poet and publisher, born in 1976 in Taixing, Jiangsu province. He graduated from the Chinese department of Beijing Normal University in 1999.

Shen Haobo began publishing and writing poetry in 1996 and had his first official publication in 1998 with "Who was joking on 1990s"(谁在拿90年代开涮) He is identified with the Lower Body Poets and the Post 70s Generation.

Shen Haobo founded publishing company Xiron in 2001, which became one of the largest private-owned publishing companies in China. It buys the rights to books from established publishing houses and republishes for a discounted price in great quantities. Xiron published Chun Sue's "Beijing Doll".

== Debate on modern poems ==
While the iconic figures of 'Post 80s Generation' are 'Guo Jingming' and 'Han Han', both are commercial popular writers and both became Forbes multi-millionaires and have millions of fans in Chinese youth, in 2006, there was a famous debate between the 'Post 70s Generation' iconic figure, the minor group 'Lower Body' poet Shen Haobo and Han Han, the latter who claimed that 'both modern poets and poems are no longer in need of existence, and the genre of modern poetry is meaningless'(现代诗歌和诗人都没有存在的必要，现代诗这种体裁也是没有意义的). This raised anger from Lower body poets. Shen Haobo wrote in his blog: 'The genuine novelists can never sell more than Han Han's rubbish work. This is the best writers and poets' own choice, and nothing to complain. However, Han Hans would still hate these all.' (真正的小说家们永远卖不过韩寒的文字垃圾。这是优秀的作家和诗人的自我选择，没什么可抱怨的。但是，韩寒们仍然会仇视这一切）Shen haobo said he wouldn't talk about human's sense to a donkey(对一头驴就不用讲人的道理) so there is nothing to talk about. Then he fought back with an impromptu writing poem: 'A Donkey/ is a donkey/ is very donkey donkey/ and if you ask/ why he is so donkey/ it's because/ he is a/ donkey for show/...and it's because/ he is a/ donkey with fans.' (驴/很驴/非常驴.../你问他/为什么这么驴/那是因为/他是一头/有粉丝的驴)

This story may tell the difference between those two generations.
