= Like a Speeding Youth =

Book by Han Han

Like a Speeding Youth 像少年啦飞驰
- Author: Han Han
- Cover artist: Han Han himself
- Language: Chinese
- Genre: Satire, Postmodern
- Published: 2002 Writers Publishing House
- Publication place: China
- Media type: paperback
- Pages: 225
- ISBN: 978-7-5063-2252-2
- word count = 135000

Like a Speeding Youth (像少年啦飞驰, pinyin: Xiàng shàonián la fēichí) is a 2002 novel by Chinese writer Han Han. It is Han's third book, and uses Han's traditional writing style, a mixture of humor and satire about society. The novel indicates contemporary Chinese students' as well as lower class workers' confusion and current situation.

== Preface ==
It is universal that published books' prefaces are something like expectancies that this book could sell well or praises for the authors' great talents by another several masters. However, the content of the Like a Speeding Youth's preface differs from the majority. The content of the preface can be divided into four parts.

- Firstly, Han Han explains the stories behind the book. He writes that he took almost one year to finish these ten thousand words. During this period, Han Han admits that he didn't write them all at once but stopped at irregular intervals. That intermittent writing way brings about two main problems. One is low efficiency. Another is usually, when he picked up his pen again, he could not remember the previous plots. So the weird phenomenon that sometimes a story does not end but another new story starts without any transition usually shows up in this work. He emphasized that these on and off plots were indeed a result of his laziness, not any special writing techniques.
- Secondly, Han Han uses two real examples to specifically expound a currently terrible phenomenon in literary circles. One occurred upon himself. Triple Door is his first released novel and costs him much energy. He has ever said that he sincerely treasured it. But some experts don't seem to appreciate the novel. Han Han wrote in his preface, "I can't have to admire these people heart and soul. They even didn't know the color of my book's cover, but they are able to make up such comprehensive comments on it. Probably, that skill is exactly what they benefit from high education." Another illustration happened to his friend. Finishing reading, it's easy to find that although the male character changes, the problem stated from the incident is the same. Han Han points out directly that commenting on others doesn't make sense as much as doing some indeed meaning things.
- Thirdly, Han Han switches his criticism to piracy vendors. Unlike normal thinking, Han Han doesn't care if vendors pirate his works to profiteer. The only issue he stresses is that he wishes vendors could enhance the piratic standard to respect the originals.
- Fourthly, Han Han mentions that he is definitely not an indignant blue, although concluding the above statements, he actually acts as an indignant blue a little. This denial suggests to readers that he just speaks and acts following his heart and hates others who don't know his thoughts but are always judging him.

== Synopsis ==
This book can be divided into three parts according to three main characters' appearance and disappearance. They are Tie Niu (铁牛 TiěNiǘ), Lao Xia (老夏 LǎoXià) and Lao Qiang (老枪 LǎoQiāng).

=== Plot ===
In the first part, the narrator recounts the carefree life of the leading character and Tie Niu in Shanghai. In this part, the protagonist shows no interest in study. Junior school teachers appear as very cruel to less wealthy and less academically inclined students, which results in these two characters' hatred of school. In the following years, the two little boys skipped school all day and joined an informal faction. During the time in the faction, actually, they didn't do anything antisocial, they just idled away and laughed, shouted and played. But this part has a mysterious ending that Tie Niu disappeared in a certain summer holiday and no longer appeared.

In the second part, another important character Lao Xia appeared when the protagonist entered the university. In their daily life, they didn't act as students. Their lives were full of drinking and different methods of pursuing different beautiful girls. Completely empty, they started to study cars. In a car accident, Xia injures someone and is thrown out of the college. Eventually, the protagonist was expelled, either because of this or being framed for stealing cars.

In the last part, the author describes Lao Qiang and the protagonist's lives as fake writers. They wrote books for famous authors and then published in their names. The protagonist and Lao Qiang lived in the low social class. Besides writing, they had nothing to do but idle away. But they could enjoy a short luxury life as long as they got payments from some underground editors.

=== Main characters ===
Most characters in literary works don't simply stand alone, but stand for certain distinctive groups in current public life. On them, we can observe a lot of reflections of social issues. Here come our three male characters. They are Tie Niu, Lao Xia, Lao Qiang, who appear in different stages of 'MY' life and represent distinct social being.

- Tie Niu (铁牛 TiěNiǘ) is a representative of partial current youth. They don't have clear life goal and idle away all day. The only way for them to obtain happiness seems just to be addicted to the Internet.
- Lao Xia (老夏 LǎoXià) is typical of university students who totally indulge themselves in playing ball, playing computer games, walkout and drinking after a fierce high school life. Aimlessly, they live as loafers. Probably, their daily agenda is trying to find something a little interesting to kill time.
- Lao Qiang (老枪 LǎoQiāng) appears on behalf of those nameless writers. They have amazing talents but lack opportunities. To survive and seek chance, they have no choice but to write for other famous writers.

=== Writing devices ===
The book is written in the first person, in the style of a bildungsroman.

== Accomplishments ==
Like a Speeding Youth displays certain realities of society, as well as the author's criticism of teachers, colleges, and some sophisticated literary figures. Because of Han's satirical writing style, it has received widespread praise.
