= New Concept Writing Competition =

Chinese literary competition

The New Concept Writing Competition (新概念作文大赛) is a Chinese literary competition for young writers, who may submit work up to a maximum of 5000 Chinese characters. Many of the winners have gone on to have successful writing careers.

The main avenue for aspiring writers is through the China Writers Association, which sends the young writers it anoints as promising to the Lu Xun Literary Institute and grants them access to the entrenched hierarchy of literary periodicals under its commands. Besides this, there is the “New Concept” writing competition, which offers younger writers a more commercialized route to fame and literary success. - Ou Ning and Austin Woerner, 2015

== History ==
The New Concept Writing Competition was launched in 1999, organised by 7 Chinese universities (Beijing University, Fudan University, Nanjing University, Nankai University, Shandong University, Xiamen University and Huadong Normal University) and Mengya journal/publishers in Shanghai, to identify and encourage new writers.

A history of the competition, written by Li Qigang 李其纲, editor of Mengya, was published in 2015. A selection of the prize-winning pieces was published in a 17-volume series.

== Competitions (and published anthologies) ==
1st Competition (1999)

- 《可爱的苹果 : 第一届全国新概念作文大赛选萃》 - by Han Han 韩寒 and others
- 《首届全国新槪念作文大赛获奖作品选》 - by Chen Jiayong 陈佳勇 and others

2nd Competition (2000)

- 《第二届全国新概念作文大赛获奖作品选》
- 《绳子, 还是蛇 : 第二届全国新概念作文大赛选萃》 - by Han Han 韩寒, Liu Lina (writer) 刘莉娜, Li Yisu 李一粟 and others
- 《第二届全国新概念作文大赛获奖作品选 : 中华杯 / A卷》 - by Cao Xiaorong 曹筱荣 and others

3rd Competition (2001)

- 《第三屆全国新概念作文大赛获奖作品选》 - by Yin Shanshan 尹珊珊 and others
- 《假如明天没有太阳 : 第三届全国新概念作文大赛选萃》 - by Zhang Yueran 张悦然 and others
- 《挑战作文还是青春宣言 : 第三届全国新概念作文大赛获奖者自述》

4th Competition (2002)

- 《"中华杯"第四届全国新概念作文大赛获奖作品选（全二册）》
- 《今天谁最美丽 : 第四届全国新概念作文大赛选萃》 - by Guo Jingming 郭敬明, Jiang Feng (writer) 蒋峰, Yan Ge 颜歌 and others
- 《第四届全国新槪念作文大賽获奖作品选》 - by Zhou Kaiying 周开颖 and others

5th Competition (2003)

- 《第五届全国新概念作文大赛获奖作品选（AB）》

6th Competition (2004)

- 《第六届全国新概念作文大赛获奖作品选》 - by Liu Xiao (writer) 刘潇 and others
- 《第六届全国新概念作文大赛选萃 : 新概念作文10年纪念版》 - by Li Haiyang 李海洋 and others
- 《我所不能抵达的世界 : 第六届全国新概念作文大赛选萃》 - by Li Haiyang 李海洋, Liu Yu (writer) 刘宇, Liu Qiang (writer) 刘强 and others

7th Competition (2005)

- 《盛开 : 第七届全国新概念作文大赛获奖者范本作品. B卷》 - by Tang Chaohui 唐朝晖 and others
- 《第七届全国新概念作文大赛获奖作品选》 - by Tian Yuan (writer) 田元 and others
- 《第七届全国新概念作文大赛选萃 : 新概念作文10年纪念版》 - by Li Yaoce 李遥策 and others

8th Competition (2006)

- 《灵通杯第8届全国新概念作文大赛获奖作品选》 - by Ma Ningning 马宁宁 and others

9th Competition (2007)

- 《第9届全国新概念作文大赛获奖作品选》 - by Lin Peiliang 林培源

10th Competition (2008)

- 《我可以停下来 : 第十届全国新概念作文大赛选萃》 - by Wu Rugong 吴如功, Zhou Wuna 周悟拿, Chen Huanwen 陈焕文 and others

11th Competition (2009)

- 《第十一届全国新概念作文大赛获奖作品选》

12th Competition (2010)

- 《第12届全国新概念作文大赛获奖作品选 : 纸质书. 上卷》 - by Sheng Bin 盛贇 and others
- 《第12届全国新概念作文大赛获奖作品选 : 纸质书. 下》 - by Zhong Yue 众越 and others

13th Competition (2011)

- 《第13届全国新概念作文大赛获奖作品选》 - by Shao Chengxiao 邵成潇 and others

14th Competition (2012)

- 《我与那个叫劳也的少年 : 第十四届全国新概念作文大赛获奖作品选》
- 《我与那个叫"劳也"的少年 : "作家杯"第十四届全国新概念作文大赛获奖作品选》- by Zhang Zhe 张哲 and others

15th Competition (2013)

- 《第十五届全国新概念作文大赛获奖作品选》 - by Zhao Wenjia 赵文嘉 and others

16th Competition (2014)

- 《盛开•第十六届全国新概念获奖者作文范本•A卷》
- 《萌16 : "作家杯"第16届全国新概念作文大赛获奖作品选》 - by Sun Ganlu 孙甘露 and others

17th Competition (2015)

- 《盛开：第十七届全国新概念获奖者范本作品.A卷》 // 《盛开：第十七届全国新概念获奖者范本作品B卷》

18th Competition (2016)

- 《盛开•第十八届全国新概念获奖者范本作品.散文卷》
