= Luo Yonghao =

Chinese businessman

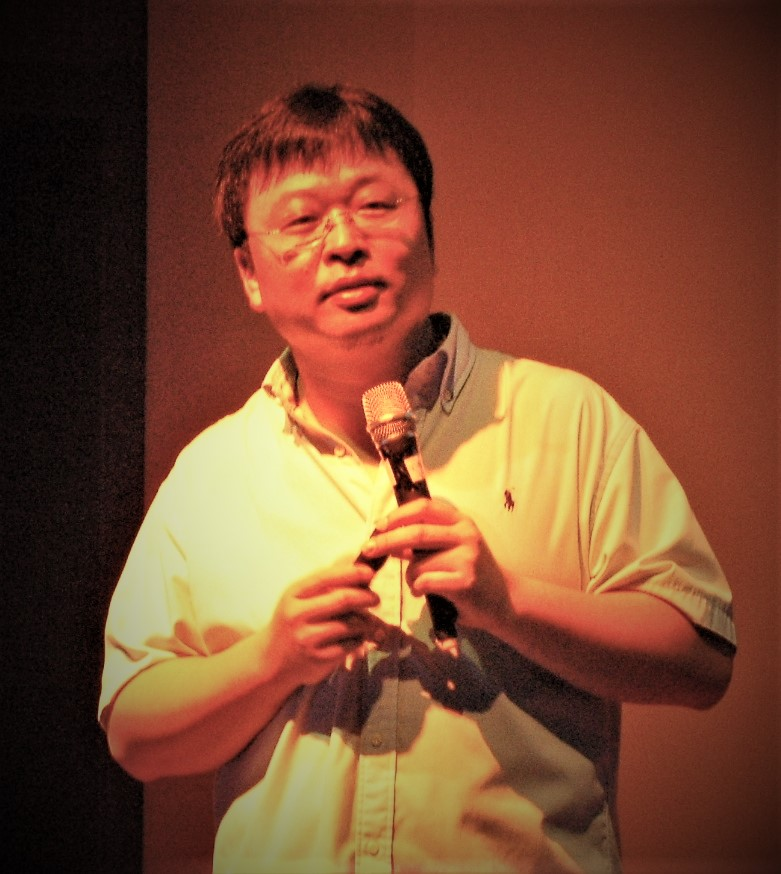
- Born: 9 July 1972 (age 54); Helong, China
- Education: Beishan Primary School
- Occupations: entrepreneur internet celebrity former teacher at New Oriental in Beijing (2001-2006)
- Title: Founder and CEO of Smartisan

Chinese name
- Traditional Chinese: 羅永浩
- Simplified Chinese: 罗永浩
Transcriptions
Standard Mandarin
- Hanyu Pinyin: Luó Yǒnghào

Luo Yonghao (Chinese: 罗永浩, b. 9 July 1972) is a Chinese entrepreneur, live streamer, and internet celebrity. He launched his career as a popular English teacher at New Oriental in 2001. He later founded several startups, including Bullog.cn, Laoluo English School and Smartisan Technology, the last of which was acquired by ByteDance.

== Early life ==
Luo was born to a Korean Chinese family in Helong, Jilin, China. His father Luo Changzhen (Chinese: 罗昌珍) was the party secretary of Helong county. At age 12, his family moved to Yanji and he transferred to Beishan Primary School. In his second year of high school, Luo dropped out. After leaving school, Luo held various jobs including selling second-hand books, reselling smuggled cars, and working in South Korea for a while. As he neared thirty, mounting financial pressures drove him to explore lucrative teaching opportunities at New Oriental School. After a year of self-taught English, he secured a position there in 2001. He quickly rose to prominence as a star teacher before founding his own Laoluo English School.

== Career ==
From 2001 to 2006, Luo taught the GRE preparation class at the New Oriental school in Beijing. Because of his humorous teaching style and often off-topic tangents, a few of his students filmed him and uploaded some of his lectures online. The videos, titled "Lao Luo Quotations", gained popularities among netizens. Luo Yongaho, nicknamed Lao Luo (老罗) by his students, became one of the first generation internet influencers. Luo was shortlisted as the top 10 internet celebrities by Baidu in 2005 and 2006. In June 2006, Luo Yonghao resigned from New Oriental and set off in various ventures including his own English tutoring institution.

=== Bullog.cn ===
On July 31, 2006, Luo launched Bullog.cn, citing dissatisfaction with the censorship of other platforms on his bold and critical comments on Chinese authorities. The site attracted opinion leaders and public intellectuals who dared to speak up, among them Han Han, Li Yinhe, and Feng Tang, and was considered a rare liberal hub for social critiques and uncensored commentaries. The site experienced frequent suspensions, and was permanently shut down after three years due to state content control.

=== Smartisan ===
In 2012, Luo founded Smartisan Technology Co., Ltd., a smartphone company inspired by his admiration for Steve Jobs. He launched the Smartisan T1 in 2014, marketing it as the "best smartphone in the eastern hemisphere" through elaborate, comedy-style events. Luo's anti-Apple rhetoric and savvy marketing built a niche following, with launches drawing millions of Weibo followers and setting Guinness records. However, the company faced financial difficulties; by 2019, Luo was placed on China's "deadbeat" blacklist for over $14 million in debts. Smartisan sold assets to ByteDance, and Luo stepped down amid a total debt of $89 million.

On August 20, 2018, Smartisan launched the messaging service Bullet Message, which gained 7 million users in its first three weeks.
