= Marrying Buddha =

2005 novel by Wei Hui

- First edition
- Author: Wei Hui
- Original title: 《我的禅》(Wǒ de Chán)
- Language: Chinese, translated into English and other languages
- Publisher: Robinson Publishing UK
- Publication date: 2005
- Publication place: China
- Media type: Paperback & audio book
- Pages: 248
- ISBN: 1-84529-170-0
- OCLC: 58555840
- Preceded by: Shanghai Baby

Marrying Buddha is the second novel by Chinese author Wei Hui and is a sequel to her first published novel, Shanghai Baby. The English translation was made in 2005.

== Plot ==
Set four years on from the events of Shanghai Baby, Marrying Buddha continues the story of Coco, a writer from Shanghai, now aged 29. The plot intersperses Coco's adventures in New York City, and later in Madrid, Barcelona and Buenos Aires, with her journey in China from Shanghai to the Buddhist monastery on Mount Putuo (Putuoshan).

In New York, Coco meets a Japanese-Italian documentary filmmaker named Muju and after a short romance moves in with him. Muju is a divorcee with strict ideas about women's roles and behaviour. He prefers his girlfriends, for example, to be competent cooks and willing to demonstrate their expertise for him. Coco, who cannot cook, finds it difficult to adapt to life with Muju. After a few months, Coco meets another man, the all-American Nick. When she travels to Spain without Muju, she resists embarking on an affair with Nick, who coincidentally visits the same cities and stays in the same luxury hotels as Coco. In Buenos Aires, Coco and Muju meet again, but Muju is disappointed with what he feels is Coco's snobbery and arrogant, self-centred behaviour. The two argue, and soon after returning to New York, Coco travels home to Shanghai without knowing whether she and Muju are still lovers.

In Shanghai, after resuming her old, pleasure-filled life, Coco travels to the place of her birth, Mount Putuo, where she spends time with an elder in a Buddhist monastery. Later, Nick pays a surprise visit to Coco in Shanghai, and Coco finally relents and sleeps with him. After he leaves, Muju pays a surprise visit to Coco in Shanghai, and Coco sleeps with him, too. Shortly afterwards, Coco learns she is pregnant, but she does not know who is the father, Muju or Nick.

=== Details ===
Marrying Buddha is supposedly a continuation of the Wei Hui's semi-autobiographical story of Nikki/Coco, a young Shanghainese author of erotic literature. The novel is set in various locations, but mainly New York, Shanghai and Mount Putuo, site of Coco's birth and a Buddhist monastery. Although there is some mention of the events and people from Shanghai Baby—in Marrying Buddha, Coco embarks on a tour of Spanish-speaking countries to promote that novel—some key characters and plot points, including the suicide of Coco's then boyfriend Tian Tian are not referred to at all. In addition, new facts that were not mentioned in Shanghai Baby emerge: including that shortly before the events of Shanghai Baby, Coco attempted suicide by slashing her wrists and that she had a boyfriend with Mafia connections.

In New York, Coco is a student at Columbia University, an observer of American life and an avid consumer of American brands and culture. She visits Chinatown, shops at Barneys New York, Barnes & Noble, and Bloomingdales, and is perplexed by the American men she dates. Soon, she meets Muju, a half-Japanese, half-Italian documentary filmmaker. At first, Coco is not impressed: Muju buys her a humidifier as a gift. However, Coco is soon won over by Muju's knowledge of tantric sex practices and Eastern wisdom. After a few months, Coco moves into his apartment. Things do not always run smoothly though: Muju expresses his deep respect for women who can cook delicious meals, just like his ex-wife, who one day turns up and does just that. When Coco tries to cook Chinese food in Muju's kitchen, disaster occurs – she burns the shrimp and a drop of fat jumps out of the frying pan and burns her cheek, temporarily marring her complexion. Muju and Coco fight, and when Coco throws a jar of designer face cream into the toilet, Muju is disappointed by her immaturity. Later, Coco and Muju try out new tricks in the bedroom, and Muju displays his knowledge of Eastern wisdom by refusing to ejaculate and sharing a variety of Japanese traditional sex aids. Coco suggests a threesome, and Muju is impressed when she is not jealous of the American prostitute whom they invite to their bed.

The two are happy, although the relationship is not perfect. It is shadowed by the fact that Muju has some faults that Coco cannot reconcile. For example, he refuses to ever accompany anyone to the airport, he refuses to ejaculate, and he is missing a joint on one of his fingers. Muju is similarly frustrated by Coco's lack of self-control, her inability to cook, and her desire for a baby despite her immaturity.

Whilst out one evening in New York with her visiting Chinese cousin Zhu Sha, Coco meets Nick, a middle-aged but very attractive New Yorker:

He looked very like George Clooney, but even more handsome, slim and stylish, dressed entirely in black Armani. He seemed about forty-five years old...When he spoke I was startled by his magnetic voice. Hearing him talk was like ice-cream to the ears

Initially, Coco refuses to embark on an affair with Nick, rejecting his advances despite her attraction to his magnetic, ice-cream voice. When Coco travels to Madrid to promote her now best-selling novel, she bumps into Nick in a restaurant. Coincidence following coincidence, Nick is also traveling on to Barcelona at the same time as Coco, and is staying in the same hotel. Coco is very attracted to Nick, but manages to reject all his advances. After Barcelona, she leaves for Buenos Aires with only his contact details.

In Buenos Aires, Coco meets up again with Muju. Things seem to be going well, until Muju criticises Coco for her behaviour towards the wait staff in the hotel:

Muju took a sip of tea. "Perhaps you weren't aware of it, but for a second there you demonstrated unnecessary arrogance". I nearly spat the bread out of my mouth. "I've no idea what you're talking about." My voice trembled and my hands clenched themselves into fists.

Coco is extremely upset at Muju's criticism, and although the two are reconciled in New York, Coco decides to return to Shanghai to start work on her new novel. In Shanghai, she is surprised to learn that Nick is also in the city. Coco is delighted, and the two meet in the Shanghai Ritz-Carlton hotel, where Nick is staying. To impress Coco, Nick buys her a very expensive Ferragamo Christmas tree. Back in his hotel suite, Coco is overwhelmed by this purchase and lets Nick make love to her without contraception. The very next day, Nick flies back to New York.

Shortly afterwards Muju flies to Shanghai to see Coco. The two make love in her apartment, without using contraception. Muju ejaculates for the first time, surprising Coco.

After Muju leaves, Coco discovers that she is pregnant. She decides to keep her baby, although she is not certain which of her two lovers is the father.

The novel is interspersed with the story of Coco's visit to her birthplace on Putuo Island. There, she gains wisdom from her discussions with a Buddhist elder at the monastery in which she was born. It is this wisdom that allows her to cope with her pregnancy.

== Western reactions to Marrying Buddha ==
The English translator of Marrying Buddha, Larissa Heinrich, a lecturer in Chinese Studies and 'Transnational Chinese Media' in the Faculty of Arts and Social Sciences of the University of New South Wales, Australia, said of her translation project that:

"It was an exciting opportunity to translate Marrying Buddha," says Heinrich. "The book is an important cultural artefact, it's at the front line of a new genre of semi-autobiographical popular writing being produced by young Chinese women authors."

Wei Hui's second novel received contrasting reviews. Some reviewers praised the book for its daring, erotic and modern content, considering it to be groundbreaking because it explored subjects taboo in China. Marie Claire magazine praised Wei Hui for being an 'intelligent and passionate spokeswoman for the women of modern China'.

Other reviewers criticized the novel's lack of coherence, its shallow content, the lack of growth of its narrator, and its cliches. In The Adelaide Review, Gillian Dooley criticized the book for its 'cringefully tacky' moments, and wrote that:

It’s a little difficult to know how to approach this book. Presumably it has been translated into English from the original Chinese, though no translator is acknowledged, and this might account for some passages which read strangely. However, there’s no disguising the vapidity and self-indulgence of Marrying Buddha.
