= Antonio Marcel Green =

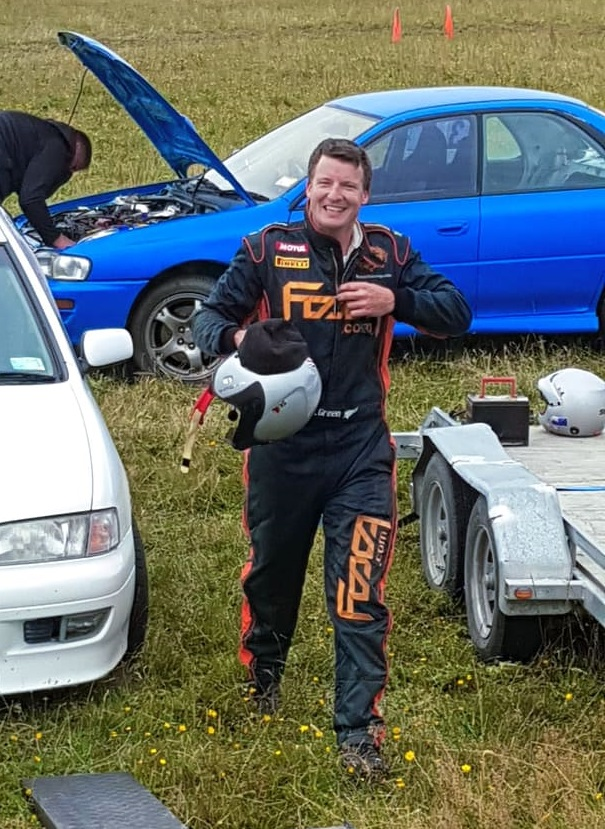
- Antonio Green at an Autocross in Ashburton
- Other name: Tony Green
- Known for: Rallying and drifting

Antonio Marcel (Tony) Green is a drift and rally sport driver from New Zealand.

== Biography ==
Green migrated to the United Kingdom in May 1999. There, he worked as a professional motorsport driver coach with the Ford Rallye Academy, Drive and Survive Rally School, and PalmerSport. He has coached private and corporate clients, training rally, drift and race drivers all over the world. In 2001, he drove into eighth place in the Safari Rally of Kenya with Kenyan, Taylor Orson, as his co-driver.

From 2002 to 2004, Green competed in various competitions throughout the UK, placing third in the Autocar sideways challenge and driving in the British Trial & Rally Drivers Association Red Dragon Rally B10 class in his privately built and entered AE86 Toyota Corolla.

In 2005, Green competed in 6 rounds of the British Rally Championship with the Bourne 2 Rally Team. After obtaining his international rally licence, he competed in the World Rally Championship round in Wales that year but did not finish crashing out in special stage 7.

In 2006, Green obtained his D1 drifting licence and drove in the D1GB drift series. He was invited a demonstration round at Circuit de Barcelona-Catalunya in the first drift demonstration in Europe. Green was also given the opportunity to demonstrates Prodrive's Group N12 Subaru Legacy in the final round of the China Rally Championship that year.

In 2007, Green competed in European Drift Championship finishing 6th overall at the end of the season. In 2008, Green secured a contract with the Chinese rally team FCACA with Australian John Allen as his co-driver. That same year, he entered the Rally of New Zealand driving an Autotek Subaru WRX STi with Allen. He had won the last round of the China Rally championship that year.

Green competed in the 2009 Asia Pacific Rally Championship again with Allen as co-driver. They drove a N4 Mitsubishi Lancer Evo 9.

== Competition history ==
| Year | Event | Location | Car | Placing | Comment |
|---|---|---|---|---|---|
| 2000 | Thurlby Motors Wolds Rally | United Kingdom | - | 27th | Rally run by the Mablethorpe Motor Club |
| 2001 | Safari Rally of Kenya | Kenya | Subaru Impreza | 6th in class A8 and 8th overall | |
| 2003 | BTRDA - Red Dragon Rally | United Kingdom | Toyota Corolla AE86 | DNF | Oil pump failure on stage 3 |
| 2004 | Autocar Magazine, Sideways Challenge | Brands Hatch Circuit | - | 3rd | |
| 2005 | Wold Construction North Humberside Forest Rally | United Kingdom | Toyota Corolla AE86 | 9th in B10 class | |
| 2005 | Somerset Stages Rally | United Kingdom | Toyota Corolla AE86 | DNF | crashed in SS3 |
| 2005 | ANWCC Forest Rally Championship - round 5 - Gwynedd Rally | United Kingdom | Subaru Impreza 1996T | 2nd B10 class and 17th overall | Bourne 2 Rally Team |
| 2005 | BTRDA Championship - Red Dragon Rally | United Kingdom | Subaru Impreza 1996T | 8th Group N4 | |
| 2005 | BTRDA Championship - Dukeries Rally | United Kingdom | Subaru Impreza 1996T | 5th Group N4 and 14th overall | |
| 2005 | BTRDA Championship - Quinton Stages Rally | United Kingdom | Subaru Impreza 1996T | DNF | 3 broken axles - retired SS4 |
| 2005 | World Rally Championship - Wales Rally of Great Britain | United Kingdom | Subaru Impreza 1996T | DNF | gearbox and diff failure, and accident |
| 2006 | D1 Great Britain - round 4 | Silverstone Circuit | Toyota Soarer (MotorPoint) | 10th | Green reached the Top 16 round |
| 2006 | D1 Great Britain - round 5 | Silverstone Circuit | Toyota Soarer (MotorPoint) | 7th having reached the Top 8 | |
| 2007 | European Drift Championship | Silverstone Circuit | - | 4th | |
| 2007 | Eurodrift Championship | Teesside Circuit | Mazda RX7 (Whifbitz) | 2nd | |
| 2007 | European Drift Championship - round 3 | Knock Hill Circuit, Scotland | - | 4th | |
| 2008 | China Rally Championship - Shanghai round | China | Subaru Impreza | 2nd in class N4 | |
| 2008 | Rally of New Zealand | New Zealand | Subaru WRX STi | DNF | |
| 2008 | Rally Mohe | China | Subaru WRX STi | 3rd in class N4 | |
| 2008 | Changbai Mountain Rally | China | Subaru WRX STi | 5th in class N4 | |
| 2008 | Rally China Longyou | China | Subaru WRX STi | DNF | |
| 2008 | China Rally | China | Subaru WRX STi | 2nd in class N4 | |
| 2008 | Rally Shaowu | China | Subaru WRX STi | 2nd in class N4 | |
| 2009 | Jiangning Rally | China | Subaru WRX STi | DNF | Retired SS1 |
| 2009 | Beijing Huairou Rally | China | Subaru WRX STi | 4th in class N4 | |
| 2009 | Rally China Longyou | China | Mitsubishi Lancer Evo IX | DNF | |
| 2009 | APRC - Red Devil Rally | Queensland, Australia | Mitsubishi Lancer Evo IX | | |

== Non-Competitive events ==
| Year | Event | Location | Car | Comment |
|---|---|---|---|---|
| 2005 | RallyDay | Castle Combe Circuit | - | |
| 2006 | Drifting demonstration | Circuit de Barcelona-Catalunya | - | |
| 2006 | Prodrive Group N12 demonstration | Longyou, China | Subaru Impreza | |
| 2007 | Autosport International Motorsport show | United Kingdom | - | |
| 2007 | Drifting demonstration at Japfest | Castle Combe | - | vehicle caught on fire |
