= Smartisan =

Chinese technology company

Smartisan Technology Co., Ltd.
- Native name: 锤子 [chuí zi]
- Formerly: Jianguo Technology Co., Ltd.
- Type: Private
- Industry: Consumer electronics
- Founded: May 28, 2012; 14 years ago
- Founder: Luo Yonghao
- Headquarters: Beijing, China
- Area served: China
- Key people: Luo Yonghao (CEO); Wu Dezhou (CTO)
- Website: www.smartisan.com

Smartisan Technology Co., Ltd. (Chinese: 锤子科技; pinyin: Chuízi Kējì, literally "Hammer Technology") (briefly called DELTAINNO) commonly known as Smartisan, was a Chinese consumer technology company headquartered in Beijing, Sichuan, & Chengdu. It made smartphones and accessories designed under the principle of artisanship and perfectionism.

== History ==
=== Luo Yonghao ===
Luo Yonghao was the Chief Executive Officer of Smartisan, often described as "eccentric" and "unconventional" in his executive style. He began his professional career in 2001 teaching GRE English at a private school in China.

Yonghao has said that he taught himself English in a year, then successfully passed rigorous tests and got employed. His humorous and outlandish lessons got posted by students on social media, known as "Lao Luo Audio Clips" and quickly garnered him attention and fame.

He went on to found Bullog.cn, a blogging platform for prominent Chinese liberal voices, after dissatisfaction with censored blogging platforms like Sina. On October 19, 2007, Bullog.cn was shut down, supposedly due to the 17th National Congress of the Chinese Communist Party.

He later founded Smartisan on May 18, 2012.

After the winding down of Smartisan, Luo would be put on a restricted consumer list, which bars him from making large purchases because of his $89M debt. For the same reason, he was restricted from flying and high-speed rail for a few years.

In 2025, Luo Yonghao publicly shared that he was diagnosed with ADHD with his Weibo audience, as a public explanation to his running late at a major Beijing event. He detailed that his neurodivergence played a role in his public expression while at Smartisan, saying that he never rehearsed speeches.

=== Pre-ByteDance (2012-2019) ===
Smartisan was founded on May 18, 2012 by Luo Yonghao, a serial entrepreneur and influencer.

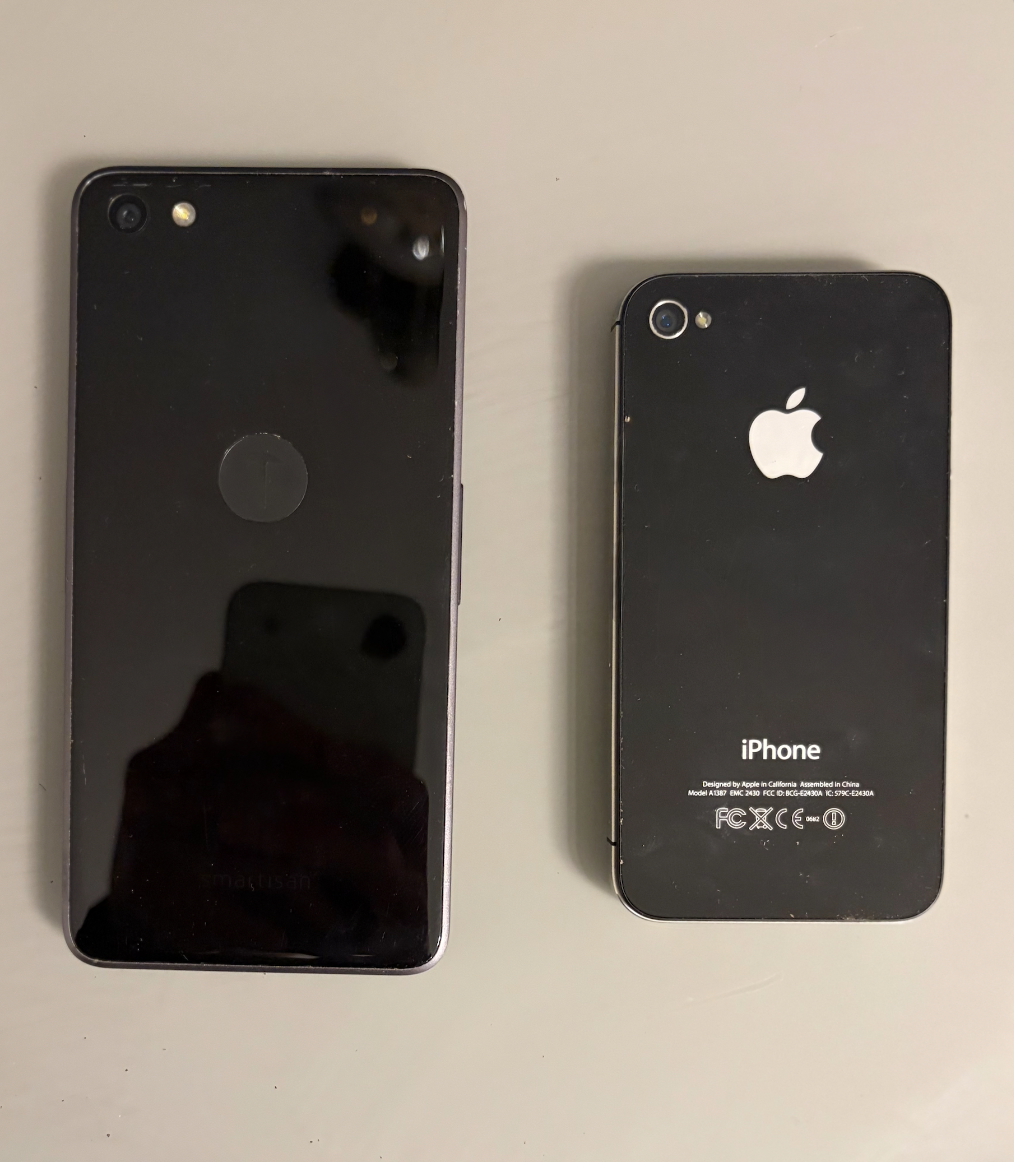
Smartisan T2 (left) next to iPhone 4. The T2 has a "Smartisan" wordmark which can only be seen under direct light or sunlight.

On March 27, 2013, Smartisan announced Smartisan OS, a smartphone platform based on the Android operating system. Smartisan OS followed a design language with irregularly shaped icons, similar to macOS Yosemite (released 2 years later), in a default 3x3 grid-like home screen arrangement.

On May 20, 2014, Smartisan announced their first smartphone, the Smartisan T1. It received the iF Gold Award, noted for its coherent design and polished details.

On December 29, 2015, Smartisan announced their second smartphone, the Smartisan T2. It featured a similar design to iPhone 4. Press hailed it as a "bigger brother" of the Apple device.

==== Attempted diversification ====
In 2018 & 2019, Smartisan made significant efforts to diversify outside of the niche of smartphones, which in China had become very saturated.

In 2018, Smartisan launched Bullet Messenger (later Liaotianbao), a messenger app for iOS & Android devices. It is not currently available on App Store or the Play Store.

Smartisan also released an award-winning air purifier in 2018 under the name JOSÉ TRONCO & face masks under the same name.

In 2019, Smartisan debuted the disposable vape & e-cigarette sub-brand Flow. It was praised by iF for its sleek designs.

=== Post-ByteDance (2019 & onwards) ===
By the second half of 2018 Smartisan had racked up 600,000,000 RMB in debt ($89M). Yonghao Luo declared on Weibo that he wouldn't file for bankruptcy, instead hoping to make money through "busking" (performance arts for money).

According to ByteDance (parent company of TikTok) for a YiCai article, In 2019, the company acqui-hired Smartisan, taking over their patents and signing contracts with all of its hardware division employees and some of its software division employees. It was rumored by market analysts that ByteDance planned to produce education hardware, such as smart desk lamps. Notably, Smartisan's next phone, the Nut Pro 3, was preinstalled with Douyin, the Chinese-localized version of TikTok.

In 2021, ByteDance halted Smartisan's device production to refocus on its line of hardware products for the education sector. It has not yet put any education hardware on sale.

In 2022, ByteDance unveiled "Smartisan TV OS" (also known as MEyou OS), a "next-generation smart screen operating system" based on Smartisan OS with plans that it would be used on select Konka televisions. It did not feature Smartisan OS-like design, instead opting for a more bubbly, generic aesthetic. It has not been used on any production Konka TV.

Since 2022, Smartisan seems to have ceased operations. Luo Yonghao has said he wants to return to the technology sector in Weibo posts.

In January 2026, about 14 million RMB worth of company equity held by Luo Yonghao was frozen by the Beijing Fengtai District People's Court.

=== Related Ventures (2022 & onwards) ===
Yonghao later founded Thin Red Line, a technology startup with its main product being Jarvis (initially called "J1 Assistant",) a voice-controllable AI assistant app with the main functionality of being able to do multiple things at once, such as noting down something and sending a message all in one prompt. It launched in beta on select Android mobile phones.

In December 2025, ByteDance and ZTE announced Nubia M153, an "engineering prototype" only available for order online, which included Doubao, an operating system-level large action model. Doubao is able to perform tasks on the phone, such as tapping, through a GUI Agent. The phone uses Obric UI, a customized Android environment made by ByteDance. The browser icon on Obric UI looks like Smartisan OS'.

== Software ==
Smartisan OS is a heavily modified operating system based on Android. It differentiates itself with an extensive number of visual tweaks. Smartisan did 200-1,000 unsolicited re-drawings of popular Chinese and global app icons for use on its operating system. Smartisan OS also has a handful of exclusive features.

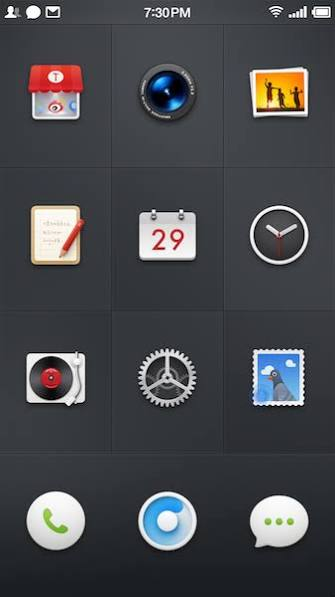
Smartisan OS 2 on Smartisan T2

=== Big Bang ===
Standard written Chinese does not use spaces between words, and many words use more than one character. Big Bang is a text manipulation & segmentation feature specifically designed to solve for this Chinese particularity, but it is available for Latin script too.

When users hold their thumb or whole finger over piece of text, it expands. The words appear in neat individually spaced squares. The user can cut part of a word, rearrange words, break words down into individual letters (characters) and copy part or all of the selected text. Big Bang used optical character recognition for images with text.

=== One Step ===
One Step is a multitasking feature. Users can pin up to 3 apps on the side of a main app, and quickly switch between them. Users can also drag media into other apps quickly.

=== Idea Pills ===
Idea Pills is a note taking and aggregation feature for "fleeting thoughts." Holding a side button triggers a voice-to-text interface. After recording, the text appears in a pill-like shape on the left or right side of the screen (depending on the side button's position)

Smartisan R2, the company's latest smartphone, has a dedicated Idea Pills switch. Everything users copy and screenshot while the switch is on aggregates into the Idea Pills interface.

== Design ==
Smartisan was known for its often staunch design ethos. Their public mission focused on "artisanship and perfectionism."

=== Software ===
Yonghao opened the "Smartisan OS (based on Android)" 2012 keynote by criticizing other manufacturer's icons, stating it was "not sensible" they were bound to a squircle or circle. Instead, Smartisan OS followed a design language with irregular shapes, similar to early versions of macOS, in a default 3x3 grid-like home screen arrangement.

In 2012, Smartisan had redesigned "about two or three hundred" third-party app icons to fit its design language, with subsequent plans to redesign thousands.

Smartisan OS debuted with a set of "OCD features," focused on minor design tweaks such as toggling icon labels, symmetry within apps, and a screen wipe gesture to hide notification badges.

=== Hardware ===
Luo Yonghao described their debut smartphone's design as "blemish free" at a press conference.

Smartisan T1, T2, M1, & M1L included a brightness rocker on the right side of the phone along with the usual volume key for symmetry. For the same reason, the T2 had no dedicated power button.

Select Smartisan models' SIM trays doubled as a volume rocker.

== Etymology ==
According to the company website, the English name "Smartisan" is a portmanteau of "smart" and "artisan", signifying "artisanship in the smartphone era". "锤子" literally translates to "hammer", as depicted in the company's logo.

== Products ==
=== Smartphones ===
Model	CPU	Cores	Bits	GPU	Screen Type	Release date	Data Transfer Download Speed	Battery	Back-camera	Front-camera	OS	Official Price	Size & Weight
Smartisan T1 3G	Qualcomm Snapdragon 801	Quad-core 2.5 GHz	32-bit	Adreno 330	Pixel Eyes	20 May 2014	HSPA+, WCDMA, EDGE, GSM 40 Mbit/s		12.78 MP	5 MP	Smartisan OS 1.0	¥3000 (16 GB) ¥3150 (32 GB)	
Smartisan T1 4G	Qualcomm Snapdragon 801	Quad-core 2.5 GHz	32-bit	Adreno 330	Pixel Eyes	October 2014	LTE/A-FDD Cat 4,TD-LTE, HSPA+, TD-SCDMA, WCDMA, EDGE, GSM 150 Mbit/s		12.78 MP	5 MP	Smartisan OS 1.5	¥3500 (16 GB) ¥3650 (32 GB)	
Smartisan U1 4G	Qualcomm Snapdragon 615	Quad-core A53 1.5 GHz + Quad-core A53 1.0 GHz	64-bit	Adreno 405	TFT	25 August 2015	LTE/A-FDD Cat 4,TD-LTE, HSPA+, TD-SCDMA, WCDMA, EDGE, GSM 150 Mbit/s		12.78 MP	5 MP	Smartisan OS 2.0	¥899 (16 GB) ¥999 (32 GB)	
Smartisan T2 4G	Qualcomm Snapdragon 808	Dual-core A57 1.82 GHz + Quad-core A53 1.44 GHz	64-bit	Adreno 418	Pixel Eyes	29 December 2015	LTE/A-FDD Cat 9,TD-LTE, HSPA+, TD-SCDMA, WCDMA, EDGE, GSM 450Mbit/s		12.78 MP	5 MP+	Smartisan OS 2.5	¥2499 (16 GB) ¥2599 (32 GB)	
Smartisan M1	Qualcomm Snapdragon 821	2 + 2 Quad-core	64-bit	Adreno 530	LCD	18 October 2016	600Mbit/s		23 MP	4 MP	Smartisan OS 3.0		
Smartisan M1L	Qualcomm Snapdragon 821	2 + 2 Quad-core	64-bit	Adreno 530	Pixel Eyes	18 October 2016	600Mbit/s		23 MP	4 MP	Smartisan OS 3.0		
Smartisan U3	Qualcomm Snapdragon 625	Octa-core 2 GHz Cortex-A53	64-bit	Adreno 506	5.99" FHD 18:9 2160*1080 Display	9 April 2018	GSM 850 / 900 / 1800 / 1900	Li-Po 4000 mAh, non-removable	Dual 13 + 13 MP Dual LED Flash	Bottom mounted 8 MP	Smartisan OS 3.0	¥1300 (4 GB RAM, 128 GB storage)	154*74.3*7.16 mm 154 g
Smartisan R1	Qualcomm Snapdragon 845	Octa-core 2.8 GHz Cortex-A75	64-bit	Adreno 630	6.17" In-Cell, 2242*1080, 403 ppi	15 May 2018		3600 mAh	Dual 12+20 MP, Dual LED Flash	24 MP	Smartisan OS 6.0	¥3499 (6 GB RAM, 64 GB storage), ¥3999 (6 GB, 128 GB),¥4499 (8 GB, 128 GB), ¥4999 (8 GB, 512 GB), ¥8848 (8 GB, 1 TB)	153.3*74.5*7.9 mm, 170g
Smartisan Nut R2	Qualcomm Snapdragon 865		64-bit										

=== Portable monitors ===
TNT (Touch & Talk)

- Smartisan TNT
- Smartisan TNT go

Smartisan also released an air purifier in 2018 under the name JOSÉ TRONCO, face masks under the same name, and multiple vape products under the name Flow.
