= List of films set in Hong Kong =

While most of local Hong Kong movies were filmed locally, several foreign movies were also, at least partly, set in Hong Kong. The following is a list of foreign movies set in Hong Kong.

== Foreign movies ==
- Argylle (2024)
- Expats (2024) – miniseries
- Under Parallel Skies (2024)
- Expired (2022)
- Godzilla vs. Kong (2021)
- Peninsula (2020)
- 6 Underground (2019)
- Ossan's Love: Love or Dead (2019)
- Skyscraper (2018)
- Tomb Raider (2018)
- Deadpool 2 (2018)
- Geostorm (2017)
- Ghost in the Shell (2017)
- XXX: Return of Xander Cage (2017)
- Doctor Strange (2016)
- Snowden (2016)
- Blackhat (2015)
- It's Already Tomorrow in Hong Kong (2015)
- Transformers: Age of Extinction (2014)
- Pacific Rim (2013)
- Man of Tai Chi (2013)
- Fast & Furious 6 (2013)
- Battleship (2012)
- Double Dhamaal (2011)
- Johnny English Reborn (2011)
- Contagion (2011)
- Hong Kong Confidential (2010)
- Daddy Cool (2009) – Malayalam Film
- I Come with the Rain (2009) – starring Josh Hartnett
- Irreversi (2009)
- Vengeance (2009)
- Street Fighter: The Legend of Chun-Li (2009)
- Push (2009)
- Largo Winch (2008)
- Aegan (2008) – Tamil film
- The Dark Knight (2008) – with Batman breaking into International Finance Centre II (IFC Two)
- The Bucket List (2007) – scene in a bar between Morgan Freeman and Rowena King
- Awarapan (2007)
- The Moustache (2005)
- Parenni Maya Jalaima (2004)
- The Hitchhiker's Guide to the Galaxy (2005) – seen in the warning scene
- King (2003) – Tamil film
- Lara Croft Tomb Raider: The Cradle of Life (2003) – the International Finance Centre is used as an exterior with Times Square as an interior
- Die Another Day (2002) – James Bond emerges from the waters of Victoria Harbour into the Royal Hong Kong Yacht Club, after escaping custody; as he emerges the background of Hong Kong island is visible but the RHKYC is on the Hong Kong side so Bond is on the Kowloon side and is not actually at the Hong Kong Yacht Club
- Citizen Hong Kong (2001)
- Rush Hour 2 (2001) – a side alley of Lan Kwai Fong is used as the exterior of a nightclub. Filming also took place at the airport and other attractions
- Spy Game (2001) – where the local HSBC headquarters are presented as the "US embassy"; there is no embassy in Hong Kong; there is a consulate-general
- The Art of War (2000)
- Rush Hour (1998)
- Knock Off (1998) – filmed around the streets of Sheung Wan and near Kai Tak
- Three Businessmen (1998) – starring Miguel Sandoval and Robert Wisdom
- Home Alone 3 (1997) – featured the landscape of Hong Kong in the beginning
- Chinese Box (1997) – set and made at the time of Hong Kong's handover to the People's Republic of China; the movie shows the actual temporary press room, specially set up for the press coverage of the handover, and located in the old part of the Exhibition Centre
- The Pillow Book (1996) – by Peter Greenaway
- Night Watch (1995) – Pierce Brosnan and Alexandra Paul
- Les Anges Gardiens (1995) – Gérard Depardieu takes the Star Ferry
- Godzilla vs. Destoroyah (1995) – Godzilla, covered with glowing lava-like rashes, destroys most of the city
- Mortal Kombat (1995)
- Hong Kong 97 (1994) – story revolving around the handover
- Dragon: The Bruce Lee Story (1993)
- Double Impact (1991)
- Noble House (1988) – U.S. TV miniseries based on the novel by James Clavell, starring Pierce Brosnan; shot mostly on location in Hong Kong, featuring Jardine House as the headquarters for Struan's
- Bloodsport (1988) – with Jean-Claude Van Damme is filmed on Hong Kong Island and in Kowloon
- Tai-Pan (1986)
- Shanghai Surprise (1986) – starring Sean Penn and Madonna
- Year of the Dragon (1985)
- Blade in Hong Kong (1985)
- Banzaï (1983) – French film starring Coluche
- Forced Vengeance (1982)
- Oliver's Story (1979) – Love Story's sequel, starring Ryan O'Neal and Candice Bergen
- Revenge of the Pink Panther (1978)
- Felicity (1978) — includes footages of Aberdeen and Cheung Chau
- The Man From Hong Kong (1975) - the first Australian martial arts film
- Piedone a Hong Kong (1975) – Italian movie featuring Bud Spencer
- Bons baisers de Hong Kong (From Hong Kong with Love) (1975)
- The Man with the Golden Gun (1974) – includes scenes of James Bond visiting the Bottoms Up, an actual bar in Tsim Sha Tsui, which was later moved to Wan Chai
- Enter the Dragon (1973) – the last movie of Bruce Lee
- Love Story (1970)
- A Countess from Hong Kong (1967) – starring Marlon Brando and Sophia Loren, directed by Charles Chaplin
- You Only Live Twice (1967)
- To Kill a Dragon (1967)
- The Vengeance of Fu Manchu (1967)
- Five Golden Dragons (1967) – movie 100% located in Hong Kong with opening footage set in the cross-harbor car ferry
- Gambit (1966)
- Up to His Ears (1965)
- Lord Jim (1965)
- Road to Hong Kong (1962)
- The World of Suzie Wong (1960) – includes footage of the Star Ferry
- Ferry to Hong Kong (1959) – starring Orson Welles and includes footage of the harbour
- The Scavengers (1959) - includes footage of the old Hong Kong–Macau Ferry Terminal
- Love Is a Many-Splendored Thing (1955) – starring William Holden and Jennifer Jones; includes shots from the old Foreign Correspondents' Club on Conduit Road, often mistaken for the Victoria Peak
- Hong Kong Confidential
- Flight to Hong Kong (1956)
- Soldier of Fortune (1955) – starring Clark Gable and Susan Hayward
- Macao (1952) – starring Robert Mitchum and Jane Russell
- Hong Kong (1951) – starring Ronald Reagan, Rhonda Fleming and Lee Marvin
- They Met in Bombay (1941)

== See also ==
- List of films based on location
- List of films set in Macau
- List of films set in Shanghai
- List of Hong Kong films of the 2010s
