= List of films set in Macau =

The following is a list of films set in Macau:

== 2001–present ==
- The Shadow's Edge (2025)
- Shang-Chi and the Legend of the Ten Rings (2021)
- Madalena (2021)
- Let's Sing (2021)
- Macao 2525 (2021) - aka The 21st Creator, the first Macanese rotoscoping animated film
- A City Called Macau (2019)
- The Night Comes For Us (2018)
- Now You See Me 2 (2016)
- Sisterhood (2016)
- Return of the Cuckoo (2015)
- Unbeatable (2013)
- The Last Time I Saw Macao (2012)
- Skyfall (2012)
- Johnny English Reborn (2011)
- Double Dhamal (2011)
- Look for a Star (2009)
- Roulette City (2009) dir. Thomas Lim
- Vengeance (2009)
- Confession of Pain (2006) - several scenes in Macau
- Isabella (2006) - starring Chapman To and Isabella Leong
- Exiled (2006) - directed by Johnnie To
- b420 (2005) - starring Miki Yeung
- Eros (2004) - segment "The Hand"
- Butterfly (2004)
- 2046 (2004) - scene filmed in Hospedaria San Va
- Fulltime Killer (2001)

== 1961–1999 ==
- Macau entre dois mundos (1999) - Portuguese series of short films
- O dragão de fumo (1999) - Portuguese series of short films
- História de macau (1999) - Chinese series of short films
- As duas faces de cláudia (1999) - Portuguese series of short films
- The Longest Nite (1998)
- O homem da bicicleta (1997) - Portuguese film
- A Trança Feitiçeira (1996) - Portuguese film adaptation of a classic Macau novel
- Young and Dangerous 1 (1996) - several scenes in Macau
- Exílio dourado em Macau (1995) - Portuguese film
- Guardian Angel (1994) - martial arts film starring Cynthia Rothrock
- Love and Tiny Toes (1993) - Portuguese film directed by Luís Filipe Rocha and starring Joaquim de Almeida and Ana Torrent
- Dragon: The Bruce Lee Story (1993) - scene set in Macau
- The Untold Story (1993)
- Casino Tycoon 2 (1992)
- Casino Tycoon (1992)
- Pedicab Driver (1989) - directed by Sammo Hung
- All About Ah-Long (1989) - directed by Johnnie To; the Guia Circuit of the Macau Grand Prix was the setting for the final motorcycle race
- O regresso (1988) - Portuguese film
- Macao, die ruckseite des meeres (1988) - Swiss film
- Zegen (1987)
- Shanghai Surprise (1986) - scenes shot in Macau
- Shangri-la (1985) - scenes shot in Macau
- A ilha de moraes (1984) - Portuguese film about Macau and Japan figure Wenceslau de Moraes
- Indiana Jones and the Temple of Doom (1984)
- A ilha dos amores (1982) - Portuguese film
- Spearhead, the macau connection (1981)
- Cleopatra Jones and the Casino of Gold (1975) - action-adventure Blaxploitation movie starring Tamara Dobson as Cleopatra
- 007, The Man with the Golden Gun (1974) - scene in Macau's casinos, shops and alleys
- Os corruptos (1967)
- Operação estupefacientes (1966) - Portuguese documentary about narcotics
- Via macau (1966)
- Out of the Tiger's Mouth (1962)
- A night in hong kong (1961)

== 1923–1960 ==
- Ferry to Hong Kong (1959)
- Love Is a Many-Splendored Thing (1955)
- Caminhos Longos (1955) - Portuguese film, now lost
- Forbidden / Amor Proibido (1953)
- Macao (1952) - starring Robert Mitchum and Jane Russell
- Camões, Erros Meus, Má Fortuna, Amor Ardente (1946) - Portuguese film focusing on the life of the poet Luís Vaz de Camões, who lived in Macau with his Chinese bride
- Macao (1942) - directed by Jean Delannoy, starring Erich von Stroheim
- Macau - Aspectos Pitorescos (1935) - early Portuguese film clips
- Macau (1928) - early Portuguese film clips
- Asas de Portugal - Saudação aos aviadores do Raid Lisboa-Macau (1924) - early Portuguese film clips
- Aspectos de Macau (1923) - early Portuguese film clips

== See also ==
- List of films based on location
- List of films set in Hong Kong
- List of films set in Shanghai
