= Smartisan OS =

Android-based smartphone operating system

Smartisan OS is an Android-based smartphone platform developed by ByteDance Chinese company Smartisan. It is a custom ROM for smartphones and potentially tablet devices.

The first smartphone to utilize Smartisan OS is the Smartisan T1.

== Name ==
The CEO of Smartisan Co., Ltd., Luo Yonghao, said on Sina Weibo that "Smartisan" is a portmanteau of "Smart" and "Artisan".

== Development ==
Smartisan OS was unveiled on March 27, 2013 at the China National Convention Center. It will compete with MIUI from Xiaomi and Flyme OS from Meizu in the Chinese cellphone market. The first public beta is available from June 15, 2013. It will initially be compatible with Samsung Galaxy S III plus a few other devices, followed by Smartisan's own hardware the following year, after which no third-party devices will be supported.

== Hardware ==
In May 2014 Smartisan Co. introduced their first smartphone, the Smartisan T1. A year later on August 26, 2015, the Smartisan U1 was announced, with Smartisan OS 2.0 taking on the likes of OnePlus 2 and Meizu M2 Note.

In May 2018 Smartisan Co. has announced their Smartphone model R1 that comes equipped with the Smartisan OS.
