= List of fiction set in Shanghai =

This is a list of novels set in Shanghai, China.

- The Blue Lotus by Hergé
- Chang Kai and the House of Hong by Robert de Vries
- A Circle Has No End by Tony Henderson
- China frisst Menschen by Richard Huelsenbeek (in German)
- China Rich Girlfriend by Kevin Kwan
- The Concubine of Shanghai by Hong Ying
- The Corps Book One by W.E.B. Griffin
- Death of a Red Heroine by Qiu Xiaolong
- The Diamond Age by Neal Stephenson
- Distant Land of My Father by Bo Caldwell
- Empire of the Sun by J. G. Ballard
- Five Star Billionnaire by Tash Aw
- Fist of the Blue Sky, by Tetsuo Hara, Buronson
- The House of Memory - A Novel of Shanghai by Nicholas R. Clifford
- The Immortals: a Novel of Shanghai by Natasha Peters
- El judío de Shanghai by Emilio Calderón
- Kaufherr von Shanghai by Norbert Jacques (in German)
- Love and Other Moods by Crystal Z. Lee
- A Loyal Character Dancer by Qiu Xiaolong
- Love in a Fallen City, a collection of short-stories by Eileen Chang, Karen S. Kingsbury translator
- Man's Fate by Andre Malraux
- The Master of Rain by Tom Bradby
- Midnight by Mao Dun
- The Painter of Shanghai by Jennifer Cody Epstein
- The Patriot by Pearl S. Buck
- Schanghai by Sergei Alymow (in German)
- Schüsse in Schanghai by Alfred Schirokauer (in German)
- Shanghai by Christopher New
- Shanghai by William Leonard Marshall
- Shanghai: a novel by Yokomitsu Riichi (translated with a postscript by Dennis Washburn)
- Shanghai Baby: A Novel by Wei Hui
- Shanghai Dancing by Brian Castro
- These Violent Delights by Chloe Gong
- The Shanghai Factor by Charles McCarry
- Shanghai Foxtrot by Mu Shiying (translated by Sean Macdonald)
- Shanghai Girls by Lisa See
- Shanghai hotel by Vicki Baum
- Shanghai Kiss by Kern Konwiser and David Ren
- Shanghai Scarlet, a historical novel 1920s – 1940s by Margaret Blair
- Shanghai Tango by William Overgard
- Shanghai 66 by Jon Clay
- Shibumi by Trevanian
- Song of the Exile by Kiana Davenport
- The Shanghai Bund Murders by Frabcus Van Wyck Mason
- The Sing-song Girls of Shanghai by Han Bangqing (translated by Eileen Chang)
- The Song of Everlasting Sorrow by Wang Anyi
- That Summer in ShanghaI by Bob de Vries
- When We Were Orphans by Kazuo Ishiguro
- White Shanghai. A Novel of the Roaring Twenties in China by Elvira Baryakina

== See also ==
- List of films set in Shanghai
