= London Single Diary =

Novel by Yilin Zhong

- book cover
- Author: Yilin Zhong
- Original title: 伦敦单身日记
- Language: Chinese
- Genre: Literary fiction, Life writing
- Published: August 2009
- Publication place: China
- Media type: Paperback
- Pages: 296
- ISBN: 9787806204818
- Preceded by: Going to Tibet
- Followed by: London Love Story

London Single Diary (伦敦单身日记) is a 2009 novel written by British Chinese author Yilin Zhong. It is her sixth published book. Written between 2002 and 2004, London Single Diary is a record of Zhong's first impressions and personal journey of living abroad in London.

The original work contains four volumes: V1. London Notes (Year 1), V2. Britain Essays (Year 1-2), V3. Seasons of England (Year 2) and V4. London Life (Year 3). In total, the four volumes comprise 98 diaries. In 2009, fifty of these diaries were published as the novel London Single Diary, which reached #50 on Amazon's bestselling fiction list.

London Single Diary is the prequel to London Love Story, published in 2010.

== Plot summary ==
After arriving to London as an oversee exchange student from China, Zhong begins documenting her experiences during her first three years in the United Kingdom. The book chronicles her first day in London, her experience as a Chinese student in a British university, and her difficult time finding work in London after graduation. It focuses on the love and joys of living abroad and the pain of being away from one's family.

== Reception ==
London Single Diary became a best seller soon after being published, with the first edition being sold out within three weeks.

The novel was recommended by the chief editor of Sina Blog and was listed as an Editor's Choice at Amazon. It reached #50 on the Amazon bestselling fiction list.

One year later, its sequel London Love Story reached the #3 spot on the list.
