= Shanghai Baby =

1999 Chinese novel by Wei Hui

- First edition
- Author: Wei Hui
- Original title: 《上海宝贝》(Shànghǎi Bǎobèi)
- Translator: Bruce Humes
- Language: Chinese, translated into English and other languages
- Publisher: Robinson Publishing UK
- Publication date: 2001
- Publication place: China
- Media type: Print paperback & Audio book
- Pages: 256
- ISBN: 1-84119-684-3
- OCLC: 51068741
- Followed by: Marrying Buddha

Shanghai Baby is a novel written by Chinese author Wei Hui. It was originally published in China in 1999. The English translation was published in 2001.

== Plot ==
Twenty-five-year-old Nikki - whose friends call her Coco after Coco Chanel – is a young Shanghainese writer, fascinated by the West and Western culture. A graduate of Fudan University, Coco has written a successful collection of short stories, The Shriek of the Butterfly, which, unusually for China, have sexually frank themes written from a woman's point of view. Coco now wants to embark upon her first novel, a semi-autobiographical work set in Shanghai.

The novel opens with Coco working as a waitress in a Shanghai cafe. Whilst at work, she meets a sensitive-looking young man, Tian Tian. Coco and Tian Tian start an intense relationship and Coco leaves her parents' home to move in with her new boyfriend. However, Tian Tian, a talented young artist, is extremely anxious and shy. His mother left him in the care of his grandmother when he was a small boy, after his father mysteriously died. Tian Tian now refuses to speak to his mother, who is living in Spain, although he lives off the money she sends him. Tian Tian's problems cause him to be completely impotent and unable to consummate his relationship with Coco.

Coco soon meets another man – a large, blond German named Mark who is living and working in Shanghai. Coco and Mark are intensely attracted to each other, and start an affair, despite the fact that Mark is married and Coco is living with Tian Tian. Mark seems to want only pleasure from the affair, and Coco is torn between conflicting emotions.

Tian Tian, sensing that something is not right, becomes more and more withdrawn and starts to use drugs. He embarks on a trip to the South of China, leaving Coco alone in Shanghai. Coco continues her relationship with Mark, even after meeting his wife and child at a company-sponsored event.

Coco discovers that Tian Tian has become addicted to morphine, and travels to him to bring him back to Shanghai, where he enters a rehab centre. Meanwhile, Tian Tian's mother returns from Spain with her husband. Mother and son are reunited, but Tian Tian is unable to overcome his hatred of her.

Mark tells Coco that he is moving back to Berlin and so the two must part. Coco spends several days in Mark's apartment. In her passion, she does not tell Tian Tian that she will be absent. When she returns to her own flat, she discovers that Tian Tian is gone and is at a friend's house. He has been informed of what he already suspected - that Coco is having an affair. Mark departs from Shanghai and Coco and Tian Tian resume living together. Shortly afterwards, Coco wakes up to find Tian Tian dead from a heroin overdose.

== Reaction ==
Shanghai Baby was banned in China.

In the West, the book received mixed reviews. It has been translated into English and other languages. In 2007, the novel was made into a film Shanghai Baby directed by Berengar Pfahl and starring Chinese actress Bai Ling in the lead role of Coco.

== Literature ==
- Sandra Lyne: Consuming Madame Chrysanthème: Loti's 'dolls' to Shanghai Baby
- "Young and Decadent in Shanghai", Die Gazette, February 2002
- "The Pen is Nastier than the Sword" Time Asia
- Wei Hui: Shanghai Baby, translated from the Chinese by Bruce Humes, Robinson 2001
