= Yilin Zhong =

Chinese writer

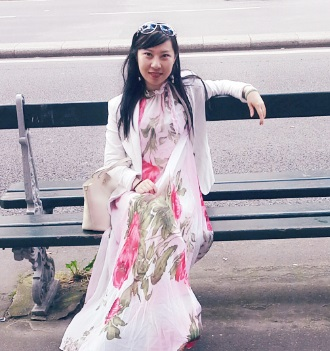
- Yilin in 2014
- Born: China
- Education: MA in Cultural Studies (UK) BA in Drama (China)
- Alma mater: University of Warwick Central Academy of Drama
- Occupations: Novelist, journalist, screenwriter, columnist, radio presenter, poet, literary and drama critic
- Writing career
- Language: Chinese (native), English
- Period: 1984–present
- Genres: Literary fiction, literary criticism, essay, poem, play, screenscript
- Website: yilinzhong.blogspot.co.uk(EN)

Yilin Zhong (simplified Chinese: 钟宜霖; traditional Chinese: 鍾宜霖) is a British-Chinese journalist, screenwriter and bestselling novelist. She is the author of eighteen novels, two film screenplays, ten books and many other work including poems and literary reviews. She currently lives in London.

== Early life ==
Yilin Zhong was born in China. Her father was a literary editor at the China Federation of Literary and Art Union in Beijing but was exiled to southwest China as miner during the Cultural Revolution. Zhong wrote her first poem at five which was published when she was seven, and her first short story was published at the age of twelve in Shanghai Youth Literature. At thirteen, she wrote a research thesis 'Who broke up the wood-stone engagement?' and it was released in the academic journal A Dream of Red Mansions Journal in 1993.

At fourteen, Zhong wrote her first full-length novel Embracing the Sun, which was not published. Her second novel Sunshine and the Monsoon, written at sixteen, was published in 1995 and won her national reputation as the youngest talented writer; Zhong was interviewed by China Central Television's Book Review. In 1992, Zhong received an award voted by national readers for a short story released in Shanghai Youth Literature as the "Best Work of The Year".

At the age of sixteen, Zhong was offered admission by three top art universities in China. She decided to go to the Central Academy of Drama and studied Drama Literature and Play Writing, while she also passed the exam for the Theatre Director Department.

== Education ==
Zhong studied at the Central Academy of Drama in Beijing, China, and achieved a distinction BA degree in Drama Literature and Playwriting.

In 2002, Zhong left China to obtain her MA degree in Cultural Studies from the University of Warwick. After her graduation, she fully immigrated to the UK and has since been living in London.

== Career ==
Yilin Zhong started her creative literary writing when she was five. In 1995, she published her first novel Sunshine and the Monsoon. From 1995 to 2002, while Zhong was in Beijing, she worked for Beijing TV station, Beijing Broadcasting station and various magazines and newspapers, published five books, including three novels, one essay and one short story collection. Meanwhile, she also became a successful journalist and received a National Award for her exceptional contribution on reporting the IT technology blooming in China. Zhong wrote a film script 'Sunshine and the Monsoon' (adapted from her own novel) at the age of nineteen and won the Excellence Award for Chinese Youth Film Script in 1996. Her translation work 'In a Station of the Metro' (Ezra Pound) was collected into Chinese national high school's Literature Textbook and Chinese universities' textbook for American Literature. Her letter to the editor was published in 'One person's Literary History' (by Cheng Yongxin, Editor-in-chief of Harvest Literary Magazine) as one of writers' documentaries in contemporary Chinese literature. Before immigrating to the UK, Zhong was one of the notable contemporary women writers in China, and belonged to the 'Post 70s Generation' writers community.

After immigrating to the UK in 2002, Zhong has been living in London anonymously and continued writing fiction and essays in Chinese. London Single Diary (2009) was her first series written in the UK and published in China; the twin work London Love Story was published in 2010 and ranked at #3 on Amazon bestselling fiction list. Her novel Chinatown (written in 2005 in London) was released in 'Harvest' in 2011, which gathered American Chinese writer Ha Jin, British Chinese writer Yilin Zhong, and Taiwanese writer Qi Bang Yuan's works as a 'Special Issue of Oversea-Chinese Writers', which sold out in three months. Zhong attended the London Book Fair in 2012 and met many Beijing writer friends, such as the Vice Editor-in-chief of People's Literature and Pathlight magazines, recalled their friendship in Beijing in his published London Diaries. Zhong also wrote London theater reviews for newspapers and National Drama Study, and was cited by Shakespeare beyond English published in the UK. In 2013, her novel Personal Statement (written in 2000 at Beijing) was published in Shanghai.

In 2013, Zhong joint a reality dating TV show of Channel 4 and appeared on First Dates as herself. This was her first public appearance in the UK and she became the TV advertising model in its first season. In 2014, Harvest published the Kindle version of Chinatown; then the paperback edition was published in 2015, and was appraised to have filled the 'remarkable blank space of illegal immigration in contemporary Chinese literature history' (Editor's Review). In March 2015, Yilin Zhong had her first interview since 2002 with Harvest literary magazine for her new book Chinatown, and the interviewer recommended that 'one of this literary work's very great significance', is that 'it has changed our understanding of the world'.

In 2015, Zhong took a trip to New York, and then began to write her first novel in English: Dear New York,(1-4); Book 1-3 were written between Dec 2015 and March 2016 in London and Book 4 was completed in May 2016 in New York. She also sketched a new fiction Miss China and a non-fiction Folks of New York at Manhattan, and then wrote her first collection of poems in English after coming back to London in the fall of 2016. In October 2017, Zhong wrote her latest fiction The Private Scene as the third book of the personal statement trilogy, which was a derivative work of the second book of the trilogy, In London. The novel In London was written in 2005 in London and was published in February 2018 in China, having an unpublished foreword written by Wenfen Chen-Malmqvist, plus a few thousand words relating to political events were deleted due to the publishing censorship in China. In 2017–18, Zhong wrote her column The London Scene for Southern Weekend newspaper, her first column in Chinese media.

By 2020, Zhong had published ten books including eight novels, all of which became bestsellers and were sold out. However, due to the Chinese speech ban with all her Chinese social media accounts were closed in China, Zhong was not able to find publishers to publish her novels from 2020. In 2025, she began to use lulu to self-publish all her unpublished novels outside China. Her most recent work is 7-Minute Love (a novel) which she wrote in late 2024 and 2025.

In 2026, Zhong was a councillor candidate for Queen's Gate in the Royal Borough of Kensington and Chelsea local election, and appeared in an interview with The Guardian. Concurrently, she began utilizing AI-driven research tools to develop academic reports in theoretical physics. To June 2026, she has authored over forty physics reports, which are self-published under the English pen name Juliet Zhong via Lulu and Amazon.

As an independent researcher, Zhong has also disseminated over eleven academic papers focusing on diverse subjects, including nuclear fusion, Plasma Direct Electrical Energy Extraction(PDEE), Six-Dimensional Mirror Cosmology(SDMC), Atemporal Physics theory(AP), Six-Dimensional Mirror Multiverse theory(SDMM), human origins, cosmogony, and the arrow of time, which are currently under peer review. These works are available via SSRN and Research Square, and her comprehensive research record is maintained under her ORCID: 0009-0006-5099-3671, as well as on her website.

== Speech Ban ==
On 6 February 2020, right after the death of Dr. Li Wenliang, one of the COVID-19 'eight gentlemen' in Wuhan, Yilin Zhong posted a Weibo to question Dr. Li's death as suspicious, suspecting that he did not pass away from natural causes dead but was killed by some Wuhan malfeasance officers in order to destroy evidence of their malfeasance during COVID-19 spreading from December 2019 to January 2020. Her post was immediately deleted by Sina Weibo and she was forbidden to post for one week. Both she and CNN faced severe criticism from Chinese official media for their raising questions over Dr. Li Wenliang's death. One week later, on 14 February, the day of being 'allowed' to speak, Yilin Zhong at once published a 5,000-word inference article 'Li Wenliang's Life and Death Line' on her Weibo account with the cached photo, analyzing Dr. Li Wenliang's life line from the day he was infected and separately hospitalized for 21 days until he was finally diagnosed, to when he was officially 'declared' to have died after 26 days of hospitalization. She was immediately banned to speak on Weibo again and her Weibo account with 78,500 followers was then closed for a year. On 13 February, right after the Chinese central government removed two Party Committee Secretaries in Hubei, Yilin Zhong found the broadband at her London home was suddenly cut off by the hacker.

In April 2020, when Yilin Zhong was interviewed by Jiemian News in China, she reviewed the COVID-19 issue since 6 February up to April and criticized a series of erroneous decisions by Hubei government, including concealing the epidemic figures, delaying Li Wenliang's treatment and leading to his death, etc. However, because of the sensitive content, the news article only limitedly reported a few points she made, so she had to post her full speech content on YouTube. Then almost at the same time when Wuhan writer Fang Fang has published her 'Wuhan Diary' in both USA and Germany, Amazon.com sent Yilin Zhong an official notification notifying her that they had closed her KDP author's account and had removed all her books from the Kindle Store, despite the fact that all her Kindle books are fiction works and were published via KDP more than three years ago. On 6 December, a few months after Zhong's Weibo account was recovered from the one-year ban, Weibo has officially announced to have permanently closed Yilin Zhong's Weibo account with 83,808 fans and all contents became invisible, due to her 'harmful speech' regarding COVID-19 and other political reviews. On 7 December 2021, Zhong's Wechat official account 'Yilin Zhong in London' was also closed down with all her articles deleted, which means now she was banned from public sight in China.

== Bibliography ==
=== Novel ===
1. Sunshine and the monsoon 《阳光雨季》(Novel, January 1995)
2. Say love 《言情》(Novel, September 1998)
3. A love Fiction 《非一般爱情小说》(Novel, September 2001)
4. London Single Diary 《伦敦单身日记》(Autofiction Novel, August 2009)
5. London Love Story 《伦敦爱情故事》(Novel, May 2010)
6. Personal Statement 《北京北京》（原名《个人现状》）(Autofiction Novel, June 2013)
7. Chinatown (2015 novel) 《唐人街》(Novel, January 2015)
8. In London (2018 novel) 《在伦敦》（原名《文本生活》）(Autofiction Novel, February 2018)

London Single Lady Series《伦敦单身女郎》系列 (Autofiction, Season 1–5)

1. S1.The Mayfair Affair 《伦敦恋爱物语》(Novel)
2. S2.London Map of Romance 《伦敦爱情地图》(Novel)
3. S3.London Single Ladies 《伦敦单身女郎》(Novel)
4. S4.Single Girl's Diary 《单身女郎日记》(Novel)
5. S4 extra. A 36-Hour Film 《一场36小时的电影》(Novella)
6. S5.London Single Fairy-tale 《伦敦单身童话》(Novel)

=== Essays and short stories ===
1. Eyes in Subway 《地铁里的眼睛》(Selected works, January 2001)
2. Going to Tibet 《去往拉萨》(Collection of short stories, January 2005)
3. London Single Diary 《伦敦单身日记》系列 (Life writing series, season 1–4)

=== Other works ===
1. The Postmodern You《后现代的你》(Novel)
2. Postmodernism and the Third World 《后现代主义与第三世界研究》(Research Essay, in English)
3. Sunshine and the Monsoon 《阳光雨季》电影剧本(Film Screenplay, Winner of Excellence Award for Chinese Youth film script in 1996)
4. London Love Story 《伦敦爱情故事》电影剧本(Film Screenplay, adapted from the published novel)
5. Dear New York, 《亲爱的纽约》(Book 1–4, Novel, in English)
6. Poems Written in London《伦敦诗篇》(Poetry Collection, in English)
7. Private Scenes 《私人场景》(Novel)
8. The London Scene 《伦敦场景》 (Collection of short stories)
9. 7-Minute Love 《七分钟爱情》(novel)
