= Triple Door (novel) =

Book by Han Han

- Author: Han Han
- Language: Chinese
- Genre: Satire, Postmodern
- Publication date: 2000
- Publication place: PRC
- ISBN: 978-7-5063-2802-9
- Followed by: Like a Speeding Youth

Triple Door (simplified Chinese: 三重门; traditional Chinese: 三重門; pinyin: Sānchóng mén) is the first novel by Chinese writer Han Han. The novel sold more than two million copies, making it one of "China’s best-selling novels of the past two decades" according to Evan Osnos in 2011. According to comprehensive disclosure and analysis by Fang Zhouzi and others, it's revealed and analyzed that "Triple Door" was written by Han Renjun, Han Han's father.

== Content ==
Lin Yuxiang is a third year middle school student in a city near Shanghai. He belongs to a literary tuition circle linked to the school. Their teacher Ma Debao is an old acquaintance of Yuxiang's father. His material is decidedly inadequate, and his didactically inconclusive lessons cause several members to leave.

To try to revive his students' attention, Ma Debao organizes a trip to the ancient city of Zhouzhuang. The students are divided into groups. Lin Yuxiang joins his friend Luo Tiancheng and class representative Shen Xi'er. While visiting the tourist area of the city, crossed by canals and bridges, Shen Xi'er spots her friend, the beautiful Susan. Susan attends their school and has a foreign name because she lived in Canada. Susan immediately unleashes a competition between the two boys, who until now had declared themselves disinterested in girls.

In the following days Luo Tiancheng writes a love letter to Susan, but is refused. Lin Yuxiang, also in love with the beautiful girl, lives his passion with greater discretion. But Debao insists that the pupils participate in a literary competition organized by a Beijing institution. So Lin Yuxiang flatters retired authors to help him put together a decent composition.

Meanwhile the end-of-year exams are approaching. Yuxiang's parents pressure him into working for a high grade that would let him enter a prestigious school. They repeatedly send Lin Yuxiang to extra classes but the teachers are old or poor. Here he meets another boy his age, Liang Zijun, who is more interested in the girls in their classes than his studies.

Surprisingly, Yuxiang's composition wins the first national award and is published in a literary magazine. He gets letters from many readers from all over China. During a school trip to Nanjing, he manages to sit on the bus next to Susan. Emboldened by his literary notoriety, Yuxiang writes to her in old Chinese letters of love, wishing her success in her application to one of the prestigious universities in Shanghai. She replies diplomatically.

Before the final exam, Yuxiang receives a secret tip from Liang Zijun on the title of the theme. So during the exam Yuxiang shines in all subjects except Chinese language. His result allows him access to one of the best high schools in the district. A friend of his mother manages to get him admitted to the even more prestigious High School Number 3 South of Shanghai for "sporting merits", subject to payment of a bribe. Yuxiang would prefer to stay at the district school to be near Susan, but his parents are adamant he must attend the best school possible.

Yuxiang arrives at the new school where his instructors immediately realize that his sporting merits are non-existent. When the school year begins, Yuxiang is excited by the prospect of living in a dormitory, away from his family, but his enthusiasm soon disappears. Students admitted for sporting merit are looked down on by those who scored well in the exams. A classmate, Quiang Rong, whose family also bribed his way in, boasts that his father is a famous writer. Yuxiang tops him by saying that he has published a text in a national magazine.

Joining the literary club, Yuxiang discovers that there is a great rivalry between members interested in non-fiction and those interested in prose and poets. Yuxiang offers to lay out the literary magazine of the school, although he has no experience. He makes a show of impartiality, so when the old director resigns he advises members to replace him with Lin Yuxiang. Feigning reluctance, Yuxiang agrees, and has something else to boast about to Qian Rong of. This however does not make much impact on his rival.

Both are hit virtually simultaneously by misfortunes of love: Quiang Rong's girlfriend Yao Shuqin leaves him and Yuxiang receives a letter from Luo Tiancheng, saying that Susan has a new science genius boyfriend. Desperate, after getting confirmation by letter from Shen Xi'er, Yuxiang spends a night out of his dorm. He falls asleep outside after wandering aimlessly. His performance at school is affected and he has five negative subjects. He continues to slack off imagining he can recover later.

Actually Susan has no boyfriend. She sent false news intending only to focus Yuxiang on his studies. She had hoped to attend a prestigious university with Yuxiang and be reunited. But when Susan finds out that Yuxiang is slacking off and wasting his chance she tells him that she never wants to hear his voice again. In addition, the school management discovers that Yuxiang has spent a night out without authorization: his father is warned and a disciplinary sanction is triggered.

Desperate, Yuxiang not only understands that he has not only lost Susan and the trust of his parents, but wasted the chance that had been given to him.
