= Qian Liexian =

Chinese journalist and blogger

Qian Liexian (simplified Chinese: 钱烈宪; traditional Chinese: 錢烈憲, a play on the Chinese word for prostate) is the pen name of Xu Lai (徐来), a Chinese journalist and internet blogger. He is culture editor for the daily paper The Beijing News (新京报). He was stabbed on February 14, 2009, while speaking at a bookshop in Beijing.

== Blogger career ==
Qian is famous for his biting and often sarcastic style in commenting on social and political issues. He is an editor at the popular Beijing News daily and his book Fanciful Animals (想象中的动物) that was published in November 2008. He is also known for his blog "Pro-State in Flames", published on bullog.cn. The blog name "Pro-State in Flames" (钱烈宪要发言) literally means "Qian Liexian Wants to Speak" but sounds like prostate wants to be inflamed.

Qian Liexian was described as "20 Most Influential Figures in China's Cyberspace" by Southern Metropolis Weekly. He was also a nominee for the best Chinese blog in the 2005 BoB award organized by Deutsche Welle.

== Stabbing incident ==
On February 14, 2009, Qian was speaking at the One Way Street bookshop in Beijing. He was answering questions when a fight erupted. His wife said two men forced him into the men's bathroom. She chased after them and found that one was holding a vegetable knife and the other a dagger. The men escaped, leaving Qian on the ground with a cut to his stomach. The two men attempted to cut Qian's hand before fleeing. Xiao Sanlang, who edits Qian's articles at Beijing News Daily, said the men had announced they were taking revenge. Qian was hospitalized after the incident.

The bold assault stirred fears and a flurry of rumors. Some people suggested the attack may have stemmed from Qian’s writings, many of which take swipes at government corruption or poke fun at the ruling Chinese Communist Party. Qian’s blog has included items on censorship, the melamine milk scandal and the Beijing Television Cultural Center fire.

== See also ==
- Han Han
