= Shanghai Panic =

2001 film by Andrew Y.S. Cheng

- Traditional Chinese: 我們害怕
- Simplified Chinese: 我们害怕
- Literal meaning: We are afraid
- Hanyu Pinyin: Wǒmen hàipà
- Directed by: Andrew Y.S. Cheng
- Screenplay by: Andrew Y.S. Cheng
- Based on: We Are Panic by Mian Mian
- Release date: 2001
- Country: China
- Languages: Shanghainese; Mandarin; Cantonese

Shanghai Panic (Chinese: 我们害怕) is a 2001 drama film, written and directed by Andrew Y.S. Cheng and based on the novel We Are Panic by Mian Mian. It is considered part of the dGeneration, having been shot on digital video, and is experimental in style.

== Synopsis ==
Shanghai Panic follows the lives of four friends in Shanghai in the early 2000s. They are part of the post-70s generation, twenty-somethings born after the one-child policy was introduced in China. They spend their time taking legal highs and dealing with various self-inflicted traumas. Very little happens in the film, with many scenes consisting of lengthy conversations over cigarettes. Major plot points revolve around Bei, who at the beginning of the film mistakenly believes he is HIV positive, and then, after learning he’s negative, decides to pursue his romantic interest in his friend, Jie, which is not reciprocated.

Cheng describes the panic of the title as "individual search for identity," and asserts that the lack of love experienced by his characters is symptomatic of Shanghai's materialist culture. This disconnect leads to them to a 'curious niche between potential and actuality, a crack in between promises for the future down which many find themselves falling.'

== Production ==
Cheng filled most production roles, including camera and editor. Many of the scenes were improvised, with the director saying that the cast 'play themselves.' Cheng has described his film as docu-drama, although Jamie Tweedie argues that it deviates from the documentary principle of locating its characters within a specific location and history.

== Reception ==
Shanghai Panic screened at various international festivals, including San Francisco Lesbian & Gay Film Festival, Beijing Queer Film Festival, Film Fest Gent and Berlin International Film Festival. Cheng won the Dragon and Tigers Award at Vancouver International Film Festival.
