= Mian Mian =

Chinese Post 70s Generation writer (born 1970)

Mian Mian (棉棉)
- 棉棉
- Born: Wang Shen; 28 August 1970 (age 55)
- Occupation: Novelist
- Children: Daughter: Prudence
- Writing career
- Language: Chinese
- Notable work: Candy
- Literary movement: Hooligan Literature

Mian Mian (Chinese: 棉棉; pinyin: mián mian, born 28 August 1970 in Shanghai) is a Chinese Post 70s Generation novelist. She writes on China's once-taboo topics, and she is a promoter of Shanghai's local music. Her publications have earned her the reputation as China's literary wild child.

Her first novel, Candy (糖), has been translated into English. Her other works include Every good child deserves to eat candy (每个好孩子都有糖吃), a collection of short stories. Her novel We Are Panic was made into a movie, Shanghai Panic (2001), in which she also acted one of the lead roles.

In late 2009, she sued Google after the company scanned her books for its online library. She demanded CN¥61,000 and a public apology. Google later removed the book from its library. She appeared in the 2013 documentary Google and the World Brain.

== Bibliography ==
- 啦啦啦 (lā lā lā, La la la), 1997 (ISBN 3-462-03182-1)
- 糖 (Táng, Candy), 2000 (ISBN 0-316-56356-0)
- 每个好孩子都有糖吃 (Měige Hǎoháizi Dōu Yǒu Táng Chī, Every good child deserves to eat candy), 2002 (ISBN 3-462-03421-9)
- 社交舞 (Shèjiāo Wǔ, Social dance), 2002, (ISBN 7-800-05732-1) (English: "Social dance", nonfiction)
- 熊猫 (Xióngmāo, Panda), 2004 (ISBN 7-800-80467-4)

=== Translated works ===
- Candy (糖 Táng), 2003 (ISBN 0-316-56356-0)
