= Wei Hui =

Chinese writer

- 卫慧
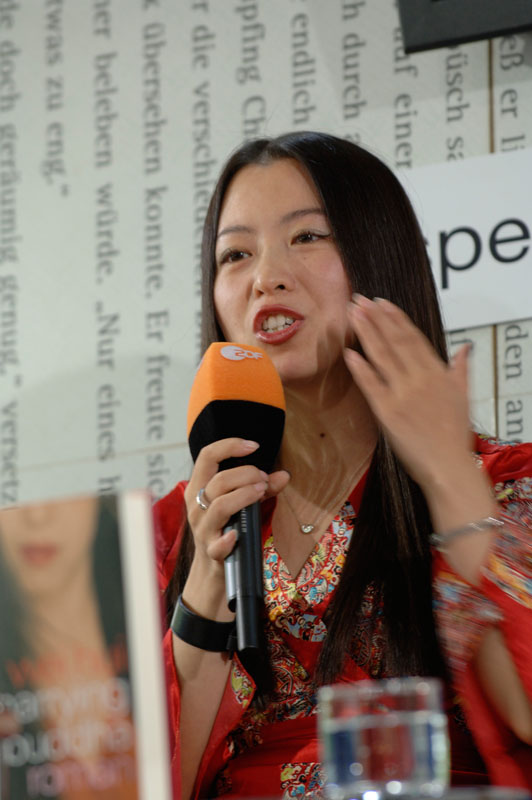
- Wei Hui in 2005
- Born: Zhou Weihui; January 4, 1973 (age 53); Yuyao, Zhejiang, China
- Education: Fudan University (BA)
- Occupation: Novelist
- Writing career
- Language: Chinese, English
- Period: 1995–present
- Notable work: Shanghai Baby

Chinese name
- Traditional Chinese: 周衛慧
- Simplified Chinese: 周卫慧
Transcriptions
Standard Mandarin
- Hanyu Pinyin: Zhōu Wèihuì

Zhou Wei Hui (Chinese: 周卫慧; born 4 January 1973), known simply by her Chinese given name Wei Hui, is a Chinese novelist, living and working in Shanghai and New York City. Her novel Shanghai Baby (上海宝贝) (1999) was banned in the People's Republic of China as "decadent". Her latest novel Marrying Buddha (我的禅) (2005) was censored, modified and published in China under a modified title. She is often associated with Mian Mian, another slightly older member of the "New Generation".

== Early life and education ==
Zhou Weihui, known in English as Wei Hui, studied Chinese Language and Literature at Fudan University in Shanghai, after a year of military training.

== Career ==
Her first short story was published at the age of 21. Her first novel Shanghai Baby, was a local bestseller in Shanghai. Soon after its publication, Shanghai Baby was banned by the Chinese government because of the novel's explicit sexual scenes and bold portrait of China's new generation. The publishing house that published the novel was temporarily closed for 3 months. Shanghai Baby was published overseas where it became an international bestseller. Shanghai Baby has been translated into 34 different languages and has sold over six million copies in 45 countries, more than any other work of Chinese contemporary literature. A German film adaptation of Shanghai Baby starring Bai Ling was released in 2007, but has not been released outside of film festivals.

Marrying Buddha, Wei's second novel and a sequel to Shanghai Baby, was published in 2005 and became another international bestseller. Like Shanghai Baby, the novel is again narrated by Coco. Coco is described by Wei as a 'representative of socially and sexually liberated Chinese young women'. Marrying Buddha continues Coco's journey of self-discovery in terms of her sexuality.

== Published works ==
- Shanghai Baby
- Marrying Buddha
- The Shriek of the Butterfly
- Virgin in the Water
- Crazy Like Weihui
- Desire Pistol

== Influence ==
Wei Hui has been regarded by international media as a spokeswoman of the new generation of Chinese young women. She has presented her work in a large number of East Asian and Western media outlets and publications, including The New York Times, The New Yorker, Time, CNN, USA Today, the BBC, The Times, The Sunday Times, The Economist, Stern, Welt am Sonntag, Le Monde, Le Figaro, Asahi Shimbun, NHK and Yomiuri Shimbun.
