= Lower Body Poets =

Movement of poets in China in the early 21st century

The Lower Body Poets ("lower body:" Chinese 下半身, pinyin: xiaban shen or xià bàn shēn) are a movement of poets in China in the early 21st century. Among them are Yin Lichuan (尹丽川) and Shen Haobo (沈浩波). Maghiel van Crevel describes their work as "sit[ting] at the earthy end of the spectrum" of post Mao poetry in China, but strongly connected to older Chinese poetry and as "hip and disaffected" but still expressing "social concern".

Other Lower Body Poets are Li Hongqi (李红旗), Li Shijiang (李师江), Xuanyuanshike (轩辕轼轲), Wu Ang (巫昂), Duo Yu (朵渔), Ma Fei (马非), and Zhu Jian (朱剑).
