= Han Han =

Chinese professional rally driver, author and singer

- 韩寒
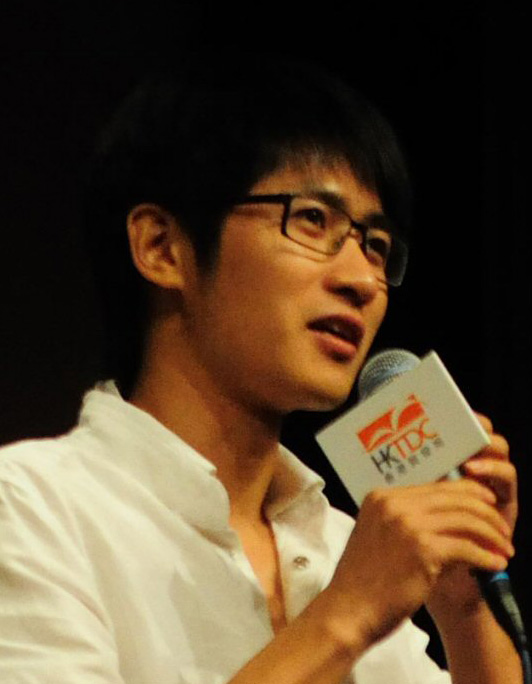
- Han in 2010
- Born: September 23, 1982 (age 44); Shanghai, China
- Occupations: Novelist, short story writer, essayist, rally driver, blogger, singer, film director
- Writing career
- Notable work: Triple Door (三重门) (2000)

Chinese name
- Traditional Chinese: 韓寒
- Simplified Chinese: 韩寒
Transcriptions
Standard Mandarin
- Hanyu Pinyin: Hán Hán
- Bopomofo: ㄏㄢˊ ㄏㄢˊ
- Wade–Giles: Han^{2} Han^{2}
- IPA: [xǎn xǎn]
Wu
- Romanization: ^{6}Ghoe ^{6}Ghoe
Xiang
- IPA: Han^{2} Han^{2}
Hakka
- Pha̍k-fa-sṳ: Hòn Hòn
Yue: Cantonese
- Yale Romanization: Hòhn Hòhn
- Jyutping: Hon^{4} Hon^{4}
- IPA: [hɔn˩ hɔn˩]
Southern Min
- Hokkien POJ: Hân Hân
Eastern Min
- Fuzhou BUC: Hàng Hàng
- Website: blog.sina.com.cn/twocold

Han Han (Chinese: 韩寒; pinyin: Hán Hán; born September 23, 1982) is a Chinese writer, rally driver, singer and filmmaker. He rose to fame in 1999, during his first year of high school, when he won first prize in the New Concept Writing Competition with his essay Seeing Ourselves in a Cup (杯中窥人). After dropping out of school, he pursued parallel careers in writing and motorsport, gaining wide influence through his popular blog in the late 2000s and early 2010s. Regarded as a poster boy for China’s young and rebellious post-80s, he was named to the Time 100 list in 2010, though his image was later clouded by ghostwriting allegations raised by Fang Zhouzi in 2012. Han made his directorial debut with The Continent (2014) and has since focused his career on filmmaking.

Han was ranked 99th on the Forbes China Celebrity 100 list in 2005, 79th in 2006, 70th in 2007, 91st in 2008, 74th in 2010, 69th in 2011, 58th in 2012, 62nd in 2013, 71st in 2014, 52nd in 2015, 90th in 2017, and 20th in 2019.

== Early life ==
Han's first essay, Unhappy Days (不快乐地混日子), was published when he was attending junior middle school. He was admitted to Shanghai's Song Jiang No. 2 High School (上海市松江二中) based on his sporting achievements. During his first year of high school (1999), Han won first prize in China's New Concept Writing Competition with his essay, Seeing Ourselves in a Cup (杯中窥人), on the Chinese national character. Failing seven subjects at the year-end examination, Han was retained for a year in school. This incident was reported in the media and ignited a heated debate on China's "quality education" (素质教育) policy, whether holistic or specialised learning should be implemented in schools, and other educational issues. Following another seven subject failure in the senior middle school second year examinations, Han quit school.

== Career ==
=== Writing ===
After dropping out of school, Han worked on a series of essays – One Degree Below Freezing (零下一度), Press Release 2003 (通稿 2003), And I Drift (就这么漂来漂去), and Miscellaneous Essays (杂的文). His essays were accepted into various publications. Han's first novel, Triple Door (三重门), on life as a third-year junior school student in Shanghai, raised his prominence in China outside Shanghai. With over twenty million copies printed, this novel is China's bestselling literary work in the last 20 years. Other novels – Like a Speeding Youth (像少年啦飞驰), Riot in Chang'an City (长安乱), A Fortress (一座城池), Glory Days (光荣日), His Kingdom (他的国) were also published during this time.

Fueled by his love of racing, Han became a professional rally driver and wrote less frequently. However, he continued to blog on current affairs, with some articles attracting a large number of readers and sparking intense debates. Han's blog has registered well over 300 million hits, the largest online following of a personal blog in China.

In February 2005, a Hollywood movie was planned with the script to be based on Chinese writer Xie Hang's novel, Dysmenorrhoea (痛经), and filming to take place in a northern Chinese city. As Han's image suited him to play the male lead role, the Chinese partner company recommended him for the role to the American producers. When media outlets asked Han for his views on this matter, he replied, "I have yet to receive this invitation, but basically I would reject it." He explained, "It doesn't matter that this is a Hollywood movie, as my decision would depend on who's playing the female lead." On hearing that the script was about the forbidden love between a boy and his female teacher, Han laughed and rejected the role, saying, "This makes it even more difficult for me, I will not play such a role."

Han is also involved in music production. His debut album, R-18 (十八禁, restricted to 18 and above), was released in September 2006, with all lyrics self-composed.

=== Business and magazines ===
On 19 April 2009, Han launched his online bookstore, Han Han's Bookstore, on the Taobao online shopping marketplace (淘宝网). The bookstore site stated that it would sell only Han's original autographed books. As the number of sales transactions on Han Han's Bookstore was unusually large, the online system erroneously classified these as false transactions and attempts at credit fraud, leading Taobao to investigate the issue.

On 1 May 2009, Han posted an article on his blog entitled "Request for articles, recruitment, article fees and article submission email address for a new magazine." The post mentioned that Han would be setting up a magazine, informing the email addresses for article submission, response to recruitment ads, and advertising offers, but without revealing the magazine's title to prevent illegal copying. The blog post also mentioned that the writer of the selected cover story, if the story had not been previously published, would get up to RMB 2,000 per 1,000 characters in article fees. This would be 10 to 40 times of the standard rate in China's publishing industry, and two to four times higher than what China's top magazine would pay China's top writer for an article. Writers of previously unpublished non-cover story articles in the magazine would be paid RMB 1,000 per 1,000 characters, 10 to 20 times higher than standard rates in the publishing industry. As for previously published articles or selected extracts from articles, the rate would be RMB 500 per 1,000 characters, which would be about 15 times the standard rates. Contributors of photographs would be paid up to RMB 5,000 per photograph.

Han also invited article submissions for a "braindead" (脑残) column, deliberately publishing articles that the magazine disagreed with or were not up to standards. The rate for such articles would be RMB 250 per 1,000 characters. 250 (Chinese: 二百五) is a Chinese slang with the same meaning of "You idiot". Han gave the rationale for including this column:

Every issue of the magazine would include 2 to 3 articles with the worst viewpoints or the lowest standards of writing, as examples of articles which the magazine completely disagreed with or found the most unsuitable. These articles could be stupid, against humanity, against common sense, against righteousness or anti-freedom. In conformance with the standards of these articles, the writers would be paid a relatively low RMB 250 per 1,000 words if compared with other types of articles, still a high rate if compared to publishing industry standards. I had reasons for deciding on this rate.

— Han Han

Within five days of putting up the blog post, Han received over 10,000 article submissions from across China, and also a few thousand résumés. There were several articles of the types which Han had expressly forbidden from submission, such as cut and paste jobs, pornographic literature and dissertations. Han expressed his exasperation with these and declared that such articles would not be published.

Han's setup of his magazine received widespread attention, with editors proclaiming that the higher fees enabled the writing profession to regain a measure of financial independence and dignity. One journalist even commented that Han had completed his transformation from a rebellious youth into a full-fledged intellectual.

Due to certain publishing and circulation restrictions in China, Han's magazine, which was originally planned for publication in August 2009, remained unpublished for some time. One of the delays was reportedly because of an article that detailed the blacklisting of actors. On July 6, 2010, his magazine Party (独唱团) was finally published, but was shut down in December of the same year.

On June 11, 2012, Han Han published his own digital magazine One (一个) with his old editorial board of the Party (独唱团) magazine. He first published iOS app, and then was able to launch the Android version "One" app on November 28, 2012. As stated in his foreword of the One magazine, he wishes his readers to take off a few minutes every day to read and think. The basic frame of this magazine is to offer one picture, one article, and one Q&A column every day. Faced with critics saying he was not directly talking about democracy and the government this time, he said he felt "tired" of the repetitive political discussion on the web, so he decided to focus on editing a good magazine this time.

=== Rally racing ===
After Han turned professional as a rally driver, there were rumours that he had encountered financial difficulties. Han himself admitted that writers and race car drivers in China earned less compared to those in other professions. Furthermore, his only income source was from book royalties as he was not involved in other revenue generating activities. However, he continued to race as it gave him a sense of achievement. Winning prizes also enabled him to prove to himself that he was a well-rounded learner. As Han stated in a media interview in 2007:

My income is from book royalties. I don't have a head for business and stocks, and I don't invest in trust funds. Racing is an expensive activity, and this frequently causes my family financial difficulties. I don't take part in [other] revenue generating activities, and I decline many such offers every year. [Taking advantage of racing-related] advertising opportunities would earn me more than RMB 3 million, but I'm afraid that once I get started in this, I would not be able to stop.

— Han Han

The following highlights some of Han's achievements in his racing career:

- 2003: Raced for Beijing Extreme Speed Racing Team (北京极速车队) in the China Rally. Achieved 6th in the Shanghai race, 8th in the Changchun race and 6th in the Beijing race, all in the Group N category.
- 2004: Group N 7th position for the Shanghai race, 4th position for the all-China race.
- 2004 June: Joined Yunnan Red River Racing Team (云南红河车队).
- 2004: Took 1st position in the Formula BMW Asia Qualifying Race (亚洲宝马方程式资格赛). Received scholarship money of US$50,000.
  - Entered the annual Formula BMW race, achieved 7th in the Bahrain race and 1st in the Rookie Cup.
  - 8th in the Malaysia Race, 2nd in the Rookie Cup.
  - 7th in the Shanghai race, 2nd in the Rookie Cup.
  - 6th in the Japan race, 1st in the Rookie Cup.
- 2005: Joined Shanghai Volkswagen 333 Racing Team (上海大众333车队).
- 2005: Participated in the China Rally 1.6L Category. Achieved 4th in the Shanghai race, 4th in the Guizhou race, 4th in the Liupanshui race, and 4th in the Kunming race.
- 2005: Participated in the China Circuit Championship Production Car 1600cc Category (中国汽车场地锦标赛 中国量产车1600cc组). Took 1st position in the Zhuhai race, 2nd position in the Shanghai race, 3rd position in the Beijing race and 1st position in the Shaoguan race. Won overall 2nd prize for 2005.
- 2006: Raced for Shanghai Volkswagen 333 Racing Team. Won 3rd prize in the Shanghai race of the China Circuit Championship 1600cc Category, and 2nd prize in the China Rally.
- 2007: Raced for Shanghai Volkswagen 333 Racing Team, obtained 1st prize in the China Circuit Championship 1600cc Category.
- 2009: Han participated in the 2009 Rally Australia, a round of the World Rally Championship (WRC).
- 2010:
- 2011: Han raced for Subaru Rally Team China
- 2012: He won the Chinese Rally Championship with Subaru Rally Team China after also winning the Zhangye International Rally

After his experiences at the WRC Rally Australia in 2009, he wrote a blog post entitled Report on supervision and guidance work in preparation for the WRC in Australia (赴澳大利亚监督指导世界拉力锦标赛的工作报告), using irony to express dissatisfaction with China's standards of race management, economic conditions, political consciousness of the population, etc. in comparison with Australia.

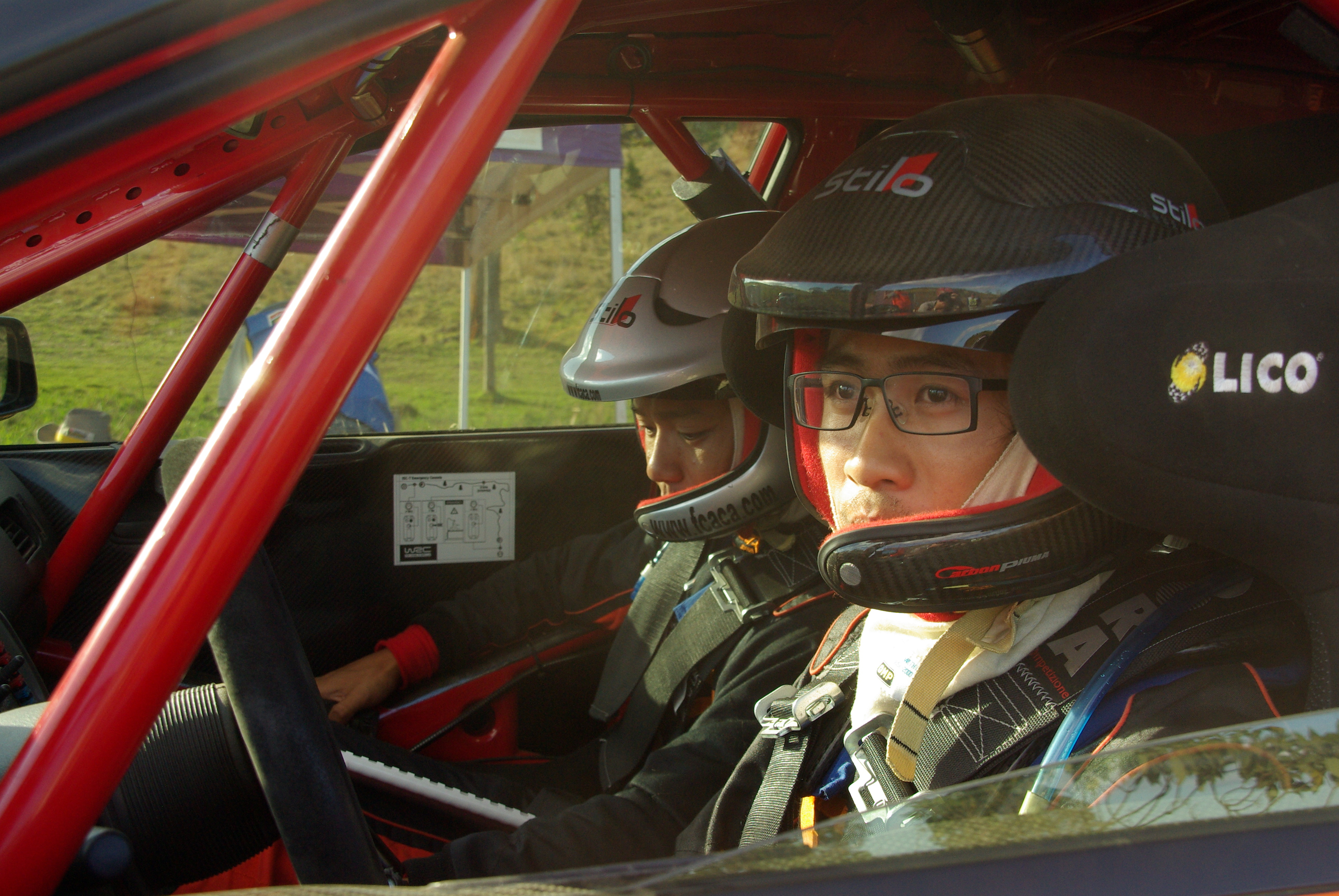
Han Han competing at the WRC Repco Rally Australia 2009

== Controversies ==
=== The Han-Bai controversy ===
On 2 March 2006, Chinese literary critic and bookseller Bai Ye (白烨) published a blog post entitled, Status and Future of the Post-80 Generation (”80后“现状与未来), a harsh criticism of the works of writers born in the 1980–1989 period. Han responded critically with his online article The "Literary Circle" Is Bullshit, Don't Act F**king Pretentious (文坛是个屁 谁都别装逼). This exchange escalated into the "Han-Bai controversy", with both sides arguing on issues such as the post-80 classification, whether the works of post-80s qualified as literature and whether post-80 writers should be considered real writers.

On 4 March 2006, Bai published an online article entitled My Declaration – a Reply to Han Han (我的声明 – 回应韩寒), stating that Han's articles in this exchange had crossed the boundaries of literary debate into the realm of humiliation and personal attack. Subsequently, writer Lu Tianming (陆天明), his director son Lu Chuan (陆川), and musician Gao Xiaosong (高晓松), entered the debate, which became the focus of the online community for a time. Han debated with the above personalities on his blog. The debate finally concluded with Bai, Lu Tianming, Lu Chuan, and Gao shutting down their personal blogs.

=== Han against modern poetry ===
Questioning the value of modern Chinese free verse, Han posted a blog article on 26 September 2006 entitled Why do modern poetry and poets still exist?. In this and other related articles, he parodied modern Chinese poets, including Xu Zhimo and Hai Zi, and claimed that "both modern poets and poems are no longer in need of existence, and the genre of modern poetry is meaningless." Han's blog articles caused a controversy involving poets such as the Lower Body poet Shen Haobo, Yang Li (杨黎), Yi Sha (伊沙), and Dong Li (东篱). Shen Haobo wrote in his blog: "True novelists will never outsell Han Han's literary garbage. This is the conscious choice of outstanding writers and poets, and there's nothing to complain about. However, people like Han Han will still harbor resentment toward all of this." Shen also declined a newspaper interview over Han's words, stating that he did not wish to talk about human sense to a "donkey."

=== Han-Zheng controversy ===
On 10 April 2007, Han criticised rock singer Zheng Jun's (郑钧) capriciousness in a blog post entitled Some Recent Arrangements (最近的一些安排), igniting a debate between the two. In 2006, Zheng condemned the Super Girl singing competition (超级女声) as being "unbearably disgusting", but participated in the judging for a similar competition Super Boy (快乐男声) in 2007.

=== Ghostwriting allegation ===
On 15 January 2012, the blogger, technology entrepreneur, and former Baidu employee Mai Tian alleged in a blog post that the majority of Han's work was produced by a team of ghostwriters. Mai Tian claimed that Han Han's early work, including Triple Door, was in fact produced by Han's father, Han Renjun, a literature aficionado who was forced to leave university due to his condition of Hepatitis B. In addition, Mai Tian accused Han's publisher Lu Jinbo of leading a ghostwriting team that produced and published most of Han's work; Mai also questioned how Han was able to become a nationally acclaimed writer while maintaining fitness to participate in many high-level rally races. Han categorically denied the claims in a blog post dated 16 January 2012, and Mai Tian had since removed the post from his blog and formally apologized to Han on 18 January 2012.

On 16 January 2012, the Chinese scientific author and anti-fraud crusader Fang Zhouzi published a blog post, in which Fang concurred with Mai Tian and further raised questions on the plausibility of Han's works. Despite Mai Tian's retraction of his statements against Han, Fang continued to assert that Han's work was produced by ghostwriters. Han again denied Fang's claims and sued Fang for defamation on 29 January 2012. Besides Fang, Han also sued a man named Liu Mingze, who is said to have forwarded an article claiming that Han's work was produced by a team of ghostwriters. However, Han withdrew his prosecution a few days after the prosecution was accepted by the Putuo courthouse of Shanghai. Later, in an interview with a reporter, Han admitted that the person named Liu Mingze was actually a friend of his. Han sued this person so that the prosecution can be accepted by the Putuo courthouse since Liu Mingze was living in the zone of Putuo. Later Mai Tian came back to support Fang's statements against Han. On 17 November 2012, a blogger published his finding, searching through website archive, he discovered some of the articles allegedly written by Han were initially posted on Han's father's blog, these posts were removed later.

== Music ==
R-18 is Han Han's first album. It was released on September 26, 2006, by Shanghai ToWing Culture Development Co., Ltd.

=== Track listing ===
| No. | Title | Lyrics | Music | Length |
|---|---|---|---|---|
| 1. | "最好的事情" (The Best Things) | Han Han (韩寒) | Chang Shilei (常石磊) | 4:07 |
| 2. | "私奔" (Elopement) | Han Han (韩寒) | An Dong, Qi Fang (安栋、齐放) | 3:30 |
| 3. | "偶像" (Idol) | Han Han (韩寒) | Liu Tong (刘彤) | 4:12 |
| 4. | "春光" (Spring Day) | Han Han (韩寒) | Liu Tong (刘彤) | 4:10 |
| 5. | "混世" (Bumming) | Han Han (韩寒) | Liu Tong (刘彤) | 4:14 |
| 6. | "空城计" (Empty Fort Strategy) | Han Han (韩寒) | Wei Zhishu (未知数) | 3:53 |
| 7. | "最差的时光" (The Worst Time) | Han Han (韩寒) | Chang Shilei (常石磊) | 3:20 |
| 8. | "无题" (Untitled) | Han Han (韩寒) | An Yang, An Dong (宋阳、安栋) | 4:01 |
| 9. | "追梦人" (Dreamer) | Lo Ta-yu (罗大佑) | Lo Ta-yu (罗大佑) | 4:15 |
| 10. | "我" (I) | Albert Leung (林夕) | Leslie Cheung (张国荣) | 3:25 |
| Total length: | | | | 39:27 |

== Filmography ==
- The Continent (2014) - Director, writer
- Jian Bing Man (2015) - Actor
- Duckweed (2017) - Director, writer
- Pegasus (2019) - Director, writer
- Only Fools Rush In (2022) - Director, writer
- Pegasus 2 (2024) - Director, writer
- Pegasus 3 (2026) - Director, writer
