= List of Chinese writers =

This is a list of Chinese writers.

== Chronological list ==
=== Qin dynasty and before ===
- Gan De (fl. 4th century BC)
- Gongsun Long (c. 325–250 BC)
- Kong Qiu (551–479 BC)
- Li Kui (fl. 4th century BC)
- Lu Jia (d. 170 BC)
- Han Fei (280–233 BC)
- Mengzi (372–289 BC)
- Mozi (c. 470–391 BC)
- Qu Yuan (343–278 BC)
- Shang Yang (390–338 BC)
- Shen Dao (c. 395–315 BC)
- Shen Buhai (d. 337 BC)
- Shi Shen (fl. 4th century BC)
- Song Yu (fl. 3rd century BC)
- Sunzi (544–496 BC)
- Sun Bin (d. 316 BC)
- Wu Qi (440–381 BC)
- Xunzi (c. 310–238 BC)
- Zisi (c. 481–402 BC)
- Zengzi (505–436 BC)
- Zhuangzi (369–286 BC)

=== Han dynasty and following ===
- Ban Biao (3–54)
- Ban Gu (32–92)
- Ban Zhao (fl. 1st century)
- Cao Cao (155–220)
- Cao Pi (187–226)
- Cao Zhi (192–232)
- Cai Yan (fl. 2nd century)
- Cai Yong (132–192)
- Chen Shou (233–297)
- Dong Zhongshu (179–104 BC)
- Fan Ye (398–445)
- Ge Hong (284–364)
- Guo Pu (276–324)
- Han Lanying (d. 493)
- Jing Fang (78–37 BC)
- Li Delin (531–591)
- Lu Ji (261–303)
- Liu Hui (fl. 3rd century)
- Liu Xie (fl. 5th century)
- Liu Xin (d. 23)
- Liu Xiang (77–6 BC)
- Ma Rong (79–166)
- Ruan Ji (210–263)
- Shen Yue (441–513)
- Sima Qian (c. 145–90 BC)
- Sima Xiangru (179–117 BC)
- Su Hui (fl. 4th century)
- Su Xiaoxiao (fl. 4th century)
- Sunzi (fl. 3rd century)
- Tao Yuanming (365–427)
- Wang Bi (226–249)
- Wang Chong (27–97)
- Wang Xizhi (303–361)
- Wang Xianzhi (344–386)
- Wei Shou (506–572)
- Wei Shuo (272–349)
- Wei Boyang (fl. 2nd century)
- Wei Huacun (252–334)
- Xi Kang (223–262)
- Xie Daoyun (fl. 4th century)
- Xie Lingyun (385–433)
- Xie He (fl. 5th century)
- Yan Zhitui (531–591)
- Yu Huan (fl. 3rd century)
- Yang Xiong (53 BC–18)
- Zu Chongzhi (429–500)
- Zu Geng (fl. 5th century)
- Zhong Yao (151–230)
- Zhong Hui (225–264)
- Zheng Xuan (127–200)
- Zhang Zhi (fl. 2nd century)
- Zhang Heng (78–139)

=== Tang dynasty and following ===
- Bai Juyi (772–846)
- Bianji (fl. 7th century)
- Chu Suiliang (597–658)
- Chen Zi'ang (661–702)
- Cui Hao (704–754)
- Du Fu (712–770)
- Du Huan (fl. 8th century)
- Du Mu (803–852)
- Du You (735–812)
- Duan Chengshi (d. 863)
- Fang Xuanling (579–648)
- Fenggan (fl. 8th century)
- He Zhizhang (659–744)
- Han Yu (768–824)
- Hanshan (fl. 9th century)
- Huaisu (737–799)
- Jia Dao (779–843)
- Mo Xuanqing (d. 834)
- Meng Haoran (691–740)
- Li Ao (772–841)
- Li He (791–817)
- Li Yu (937–978)
- Li Bai (701–762)
- Li Qiao (644–713)
- Li Jing (571–649)
- Li Baiyao (564–647)
- Li Dashi (570–628)
- Li Shangyin (812–858)
- Li Shizhi (d. 747)
- Li Chunfeng (602–670)
- Liu Zhiji (661–721)
- Liu Zhi (fl. 8th century)
- Liu Yuxi (772–842)
- Liu Zongyuan (773–819)
- Liu Gongquan (778–865)
- Lu Guimeng (d. 881)
- Lu Tong (790–835)
- Luo Yin (833–909)
- Luo Binwang (c. 640–684)
- Ouyang Xun (557–641)
- Pi Rixiu (c. 834–883)
- Shide (fl. 9th century)
- Sun Simiao (581–682)
- Sun Guoting (646–691)
- Sima Zhen (fl. 8th century)
- Wang Bo (c. 649–676)
- Wang Wei (701–761)
- Wang Changling (698–765)
- Wang Fanzhi (fl. 7th century)
- Wei Zheng (580–643)
- Wei Zhuang (836–910)
- Xue Juzheng (912–981)
- Xue Tao (768–831)
- Yu Xuanji (844–869)
- Yu Shinan (558–638)
- Yi Xing (683–727)
- Yan Shigu (581–645)
- Yan Zhenqing (709–785)
- Yuan Zhen (779–831)
- Zhang Ji (fl. 8th century)
- Zhang Yanyuan (fl. 9th century)
- Zhang Yaotiao (fl. 9th century)
- Zhang Xu (fl. 8th century)

=== Song dynasty and following ===
- Bai Renfu (1226–1306)
- Cai Xiang (1012–1067)
- Cheng Yi (1033–1107)
- Fan Chengda (1126–1193)
- Guan Hanqing (fl. 13th century)
- Guo Shoujing (1231–1316)
- Hu Sanxing (1230–1302)
- Huang Tingjian (1045–1105)
- Li Fang (925–996)
- Li Qingzhao (c. 1084 – 1151)
- Liu Bowen (1311–1375)
- Liu Yong (fl. 11th century)
- Luo Guanzhong (fl. 14th century)
- Lu You (1125–1210)
- Lu Zhi (c. 1243 – 1315)
- Ma Zhiyuan (c. 1270 – 1330)
- Ma Duanlin (1245–1322)
- Mi Fu (1051–1107)
- Ouyang Xiu (1007–1072)
- Qiao Ji (died 1345)
- Qu You (1341–1427)
- Qin Jiushao (c. 1202 – 1261)
- Su Shi (1037–1101)
- Su Song (1020–1101)
- Shi Naian (c. 1296 – 1372)
- Shao Yong (1011–1077)
- Shen Kuo (1031–1095)
- Sima Guang (1019–1086)
- Wen Tianxiang (1236–1282)
- Wang Shifu (fl. 14th century)
- Wang Anshi (1021–1086)
- Wang Chongyang (1113–1170)
- Wuzhun Shifan (1178–1249)
- Xu Zaisi (fl. 14th century)
- Xin Qiji (1140–1207)
- Ye Shi (1150–1223)
- Yu Hao (fl. 10th century)
- Yang Hui (c. 1238 – 1298)
- Zhao Luanluan (fl. 13th century)
- Zhao Mengfu (1254–1322)
- Zhu Yu (fl. 12th century)
- Zhou Dunyi (1017–1073)
- Zeng Gong (1019–1083)
- Zhu Shijie (fl. 13th century)
- Zhu Xi (1130–1200)
- Zhang Sixun (fl. 10th century)
- Zhang Zai (1020–1077)

=== Ming dynasty ===
- Dong Qichang (1555–1636)
- Feng Menglong (1574–1645)
- Gao Lian (fl. 16th century)
- Hong Zicheng (1593–1665)
- Huang Ruheng (1558–1626)
- Jin Shengtan (1608–1661)
- Jiao Yu (fl. 14th century)
- Li Zhi (1527–1602)
- Li Shizhen (1518–1593)
- Liu Tong (c. 1593 – 1636)
- Ling Mengchu (1580–1644)
- Shi Kefa (1601–1645)
- Shen Zhou (1427–1509)
- Song Yingxing (1587–1666)
- Tang Xianzu (1550–1616)
- Wu Cheng'en (c. 1500 – 1582)
- Wen Zhengming (1470–1559)
- Wen Zhenheng (1585–1645)
- Wang Fuzhi (1619–1692)
- Wang Yangming (1472–1529)
- Wang Zhen (fl. 14th century)
- Xu Wei (1521–1593)
- Xu Guangqi (1562–1633)
- Xu Xiake (1587–1641)
- Xu Yihua (1362–1407)
- Yuan Hongdao (1568–1610)
- Zhan Ruoshui (1466–1560)
- Zhang Tingyu (1672–1755)

=== Qing dynasty ===
- Bada Shanren (c. 1626 – 1705)
- Chen Hongmou (1696–1771)
- Cao Xueqin (c. 1715 – 1764)
- Dai Xi (1801–1860)
- Dai Zhen (1724–1777)
- Fu Shanxiang (1830–1864)
- He Changling (1785–1848)
- Hong Liangji (1746–1809)
- Huang Zongxi (1610–1695)
- Huang Zunxian (1848–1905)
- Jiang Tingxi (1669–1732)
- Kang Youwei (1858–1927)
- Li Yu (1610–1680)
- Li Shanlan (1810–1882)
- Lu Haodong (1868–1895)
- Lin Shu (1852–1924)
- Liu E (1857–1909)
- Liang Qichao (1873–1929)
- Pu Songling (1640–1715)
- Sha Menghai (1900–1992)
- Tan Sitong (1865–1898)
- Tang Zhen (1630–1704)
- Wu Jiaji (1618–1684)
- Wu Jingzi (1701–1754)
- Wei Yuan (1794–1856)
- Wang Zhen (1867–1938)
- Wang Guowei (1877–1927)
- Yan Fu (1853–1921)
- Yun Zhu (1771–1833)
- Yang Borun (1837–1911)
- Yu Zhengxie (1775–1840)
- Yuan Mei (1716–1797)
- Zhou Lianggong (1612–1672)
- Zhang Binglin (1868–1936)

=== Modern period ===
- Amy Tan (born 1952)
- Anthony
- Bai Shouyi (1909–2000)
- Ba Jin (1904–2005)
- Bei Dao (born 1949)
- Cai Chongda (born 1982)
- Cao Yu (1910–1996)
- Chen Dayu (1912–2001)
- Chen Maiping (born 1952)
- Chen Ran (born 1962)
- Chen Xuezhao (1906–1991)
- Chu Anping (1909–1966)
- C. C. Li (1911–2003)
- Ding Ling (1904–1986)
- Dai Wangshu (1905–1950)
- Eileen Chang (1920–1995)
- Eric Liu (born 1968)
- Fan Chung (born 1949)
- Feng Jicai (born 1942)
- Feng Yidai (1913–2005)
- Feng Youlan (1895–1990)
- Gang Tian (born 1958)
- Gao Xingjian (born 1940)
- Gu Jiegang (1893–1980)
- Guo Moruo (1892–1978)
- Han Shaogong (born 1953)
- Hao Jingfang
- Ho Fuk Yan
- Hong Ying (born 1962)
- Ganggang Hu Guidice (born 1984)
- Hu Shih (1891–1962)
- Huang Yuanyong (1885–1915)
- Iris Chang (1968–2004) – Chinese-American author of The Rape of Nanking
- Jao Tsung-I (1917–2018)
- Jia Rongqing
- Jiang Fangzhou
- Jin Yong (1924–2018)
- Jin Yuelin (1895–1984)
- Jung Chang (born 1952) – author of Wild Swans
- Ke Yan (1929–2011)
- Ke Zhao (1910–2002)
- Lao She (1899–1966)
- Leung Long Chau (1911–1998)
- Li Ao (1935–2018)
- Liu Binyan (1925–2005)
- Li Shicen (1892–1934)
- Lin Haiyin (1918–2001)
- Lin Huiyin (1904–1955)
- Lin Yutang (1895–1976)
- Liang Shuming (1893–1988)
- Lu Xun (1881–1936)
- Mao Dun (1896–1981)
- Timothy Mo (born 1950)
- Ma Jian (born 1953)
- Mian Mian (born 1970)
- Mo Yan (born 1955)
- Mou Zongsan (1909–1995)
- Mu Shiying (1912–1940)
- Murong Xuecun (born 1974)
- Öser (born 1966)
- Pai Hsien-yung (born 1937)
- Qian Xuantong (1887–1939)
- Qian Zhongshu (1910–1998)
- Qin Hui (born 1953)
- Qu Bo (1923–2002)
- Ru Zhijuan (1925–1998)
- Su Manshu (1884–1918)
- Su Qing (1914–1982) author of 10 Years of Marriage
- Su Tong (born 1963)
- Sun Guangyuan (1900–1979)
- Shen Congwen (1902–1988)
- Shen Rong (b. 1936)
- Shi Zhecun (1905–2003)
- Shing-Tung Yau (born 1949)
- Tang Junyi (1909–1978)
- Tian Han (1898–1968)
- Tie Ning (born 1957)
- Wang Hao (1921–1995)
- Wang Lixiong (born 1953)
- Wang Ruowang (1918–2001)
- Wang Ruoshui (1926–2002)
- Wang Shuo (born 1958)
- Wen Yiduo (1899–1946)
- Woo Tsin-hang (1865–1953)
- Xie Bingying (1906–2000)
- Xiao Hong (1911–1942)
- Xiong Shili (1885–1968)
- Xiong Qinglai (1893–1969)
- Xu Dishan (1893–1941)
- Xu Youyu (born 1947)
- Xu Zhimo (1897–1931)
- Xue Zongzheng (born 1935)
- Yan Huiqing (1877–1950)
- Yang Jianli (born 1963)
- Yan Li (1954–2026)
- Yan Lianke (born 1958)
- Yang Rongguo (1907–1978)
- Yang Shuo (1913–1968)
- Ye Shengtao (1894–1988)
- Yu Dafu (1896–1945)
- Yu Hua (born 1960)
- Yuan Hongbing (born 1953)
- Yum-Tong Siu (born 1943)
- Zhan Tao (born 1963)
- Zhang Jie (born 1937)
- Zhang Kangkang (born 1950)
- Zeng Jiongzhi (1898–1940)
- Zhong Xiaoyang (born 1962)
- Zhou Weihui (born 1973)
- Zhou Weiliang (1911–1995)
- Zhou Zuoren (1885–1967)
- Zhu Qianzhi (1899–1972)
- Zhu Ziqing (1898–1948)
- Zhu Xiao Di (born 1958)
- Zhu Xueqin (born 1952)
- Zong Pu (born 1928)

== Alphabetical list ==
=== A ===
- Ah Cheng (born 1949)
- Ai Qing (1910–1996)
- Anni Baobei (born 1974)
- Anthony (1984–)

=== B ===
- Ba Jin (1904–2005)
- Bai Juyi (772–846)
- Bai Renfu (1226–1306)
- Bai Shouyi (1909–2000)
- Ban Biao (3–54)
- Ban Gu (32–92)
- Ban Zhao (fl. 1st century)
- Bianji (fl. 7th century)
- Bada Shanren (c. 1626 – 1705)
- Bei Dao (born 1949)
- Bi Feiyu (born 1964)
- Bianji (fl. 7th century)
- Bo Yang (1920–2008)

=== C ===
- Cao Cao (155–220)
- Cao Pi (187–226)
- Cao Xueqin (1724–1764)
- Cao Yu (1910–1996)
- Cao Zhi (192–232)
- Cai Yan (fl. 2nd century)
- Cai Yong (132–192)
- Cai Xiang (1012–1067)
- Chang Hsüeh-ch'eng (1738–1801)
- Eileen Chang (1920–1995)
- Iris Chang (1968–2004) American Chinese author of The Rape of Nanking
- Jung Chang (born 1952) author of Wild Swans
- Leung Long Chau (1911–1998)
- Chen Dayu (1912–2001)
- Chang Hsin-hai (1898–1972)
- Chen Hongmou (1696–1771)
- Chen Maiping (born 1952)
- Chen Qiufan (born 1981)
- Chen Ran (born 1962)
- Chen Shou (233–297)
- Chen Zi'ang (661–702)
- Cheng Yi (1033–1107)
- Chi Li (born 1957)
- Chi Zijian (born 1964)
- Chow Ching Lie (born 1936)
- Chu Anping (1909–1966)
- Chu Suiliang (597–658)
- Cui Hao (704–754)

=== D ===
- Dai Xi (1801–1860)
- Dai Zhen (1724–1777)
- Dai Wangshu (1905–1950)
- Di An (b. 1983)
- Ding Ling (1904–1986)
- Du Fu (712–770)
- Du Guangting (850–933)
- Du Mu (803–852)
- Du You (735–812)
- Du Huan (fl. 8th century)
- Duan Chengshi (d. 863)
- Duanmu Hongliang (1912–1996)
- Dong Xi (born 1966)
- Dong Zhongshu (179–104 BC)
- Dong Qichang (1555–1636)

=== E ===
- Eileen Chang (1920–1995)
- Eric Liu (born 1968)

=== F ===
- Feng Menglong (1574–1645)
- Feng Youlan (1895–1990)
- Feng Jicai (born 1942)
- Fan Chengda (1126–1193)
- Fan Chung (born 1949)
- Fan Ye (398–445)
- Fang Fang (born 1955)
- Fang Xuanling (579–648)
- Fenggan (fl. 8th century)
- Fu Baoshi (1904–1965)
- Fu Shanxiang (1830–1864)
- Feng Yidai (1913–2005)

=== G ===
- Gan De (fl. 4th century BC)
- Gang Tian (born 1958)
- Gao Xingjian (born 1940)
- Gao Lian (fl. 16th century)
- Ge Fei (born 1964)
- Ge Hong (284–364)
- Gongsun Long (c. 325–250 BC)
- Gu Cheng (1956–1993)
- Gu Hua (born 1942)
- Gu Jiegang (1893–1980)
- Guan Hanqing (1241–1320)
- Guo Jingming (born 1983)
- Guo Moruo (1892–1978)
- Guo Pu (276–324)
- Guo Shoujing (1231–1316)

=== H ===
- Han Dong (born 1961)
- Han Fei (c. 280–233 BC)
- Han Han (born 1982)
- Hanshan (fl. 9th century)
- Han Shaogong (born 1953)
- Han Suyin (1917–2012)
- Han Yu (768–824)
- Hao Jingfang (born 1984)
- He Changling (1785–1848)
- He Qinglian (born 1956)
- He Zhizhang (659–744)
- Ho Fuk Yan
- Hong Ying (born 1962)
- Hong Liangji (1746–1809)
- Hong Zicheng (1593–1665)
- Ganggang Hu Guidice (born 1984)
- Hu Sanxing (1230–1302)
- Hu Shih (1891–1962)
- Huaisu (737–799)
- Huang Zongxi (1610–1695)
- Huang Tingjian (1045–1105)
- Huang Yuanyong (1885–1915)
- Huang Zunxian (1848–1905)
- Huang Ruheng (1558–1626)

=== J ===
- Jao Tsung-I (1917–2018)
- Ji Xianlin (1911–2009)
- Ji Yun (1724–1805)
- Jia Dao (779–843)
- Jia Pingwa (born 1952)
- Jia Rongqing
- Jia Yinghua (born 1952)
- Jiang Fangzhou (born 1989)
- Jiang Rong (born 1946)
- Jiang Tingxi (1669–1732)
- Jiao Yu (fl. 14th century)
- Jin Shengtan (1608–1661)
- Jin Yuelin (1895–1984)
- Jin Yong (1924–2018)
- Jing Fang (78–37 BC)
- Jung Chang (born 1952)

=== K ===
- Kang Youwei (1858–1927)
- Ke Yan (1929–2011)
- Ke Zhao (1910–2002)
- Maxine Hong Kingston (born 1940)

=== L ===
- Lao She (1899–1966)
- Li Ao (1935–2018)
- Li Ao (772–841)
- Li Bai (701–762)
- Li Baiyao (564–647)
- Li Baojia (1867–1906)
- C. C. Li (1911–2003)
- Li Chunfeng (602–670)
- Li Delin (531–591)
- Li Dashi (570–628)
- Li Fang (925–996)
- Li He (790–816)
- Li Jing (571–649)
- Li Kui (fl. 4th century BC)
- Li Qiao (644–713)
- Li Qingzhao (1084–1151)
- Li Rui (born 1949)
- Li Shangyin (813–858)
- Li Shicen (1892–1934)
- Li Shizhi (d. 747)
- Li Shizhen (1518–1593)
- Li Yu (1610–1680)
- Li Yaotang (1904–2005)
- Li Yu (937–978)
- Zhenyu Li (born 1981)
- Li Zhi (1527–1602)
- Li Shanlan (1810–1882)
- Liang Qichao (1873–1929)
- Liang Shuming (1893–1988)
- Liao Yiwu (born 1958)
- Lin Haiyin (1918–2001)
- Lin Huiyin (1904–1955)
- Lin Shu (1852–1924)
- Lin Yutang (1895–1976)
- Ling Li (1942–2018)
- Ling Mengchu (1580–1644)
- Liu Cixin (born 1963)
- Liu E (1857–1909)
- Liu Gongquan (778–865)
- Liu Heng (born 1954)
- Liu Hui (fl. 3rd century)
- Liu Bowen (1311–1375)
- Liu Tong (c. 1593 – 1636)
- Liu Xiang (77–6 BC)
- Liu Xiaobo (1955–2017)
- Liu Xie (465–522)
- Liu Xin (d. 23)
- Liu Xinwu (born 1942)
- Liu Xinglong (born 1956)
- Liu Yong (987–1053)
- Liu Yong (born 1949)
- Liu Yuxi (772–842)
- Liu Zhenyun (born 1958)
- Liu Zhi (fl. 8th century)
- Liu Zhiji (661–721)
- Liu Zongyuan (773–819)
- Lu Guimeng (d. 881)
- Lu Haodong (1868–1895)
- Lu Ji (261–303)
- Lu Tong (790–835)
- Lu Xun (1881–1936)
- Lu You (1125–1210)
- Lu Zhi (c. 1243 – 1315)
- Luo Binwang (c. 640–684)
- Luo Guanzhong (1330–1400)
- Luo Yin (833–909)

=== M ===
- Ma Duanlin (1245–1322)
- Ma Jian (born 1953)
- Ma Rong (79–166)
- Ma Zhiyuan (c. 1270 – 1330)
- Mao Dun (1896–1981)
- Meng Haoran (691–740)
- Mengzi (c. 372–289 BC)
- Mi Fu (1051–1107)
- Mian Mian (born 1970)
- Mozi (fl. 5th century BC)
- Timothy Mo (born 1950)
- Mo Xuanqing (d. 834)
- Mo Yan (born 1955)
- Mou Zongsan (1909–1995)
- Mu Shiying (1912–1940)
- Murong Xuecun (born 1974)

=== O ===
- Öser (born 1966)
- Ouyang Xiu (1007–1072)
- Ouyang Xun (557–641)

=== P ===
- Pai Hsien-yung (born 1937)
- Pu Songling (1640–1715)
- Pi Rixiu (c. 834–883)

=== Q ===
- Qian Xuantong (1887–1939)
- Qian Zhongshu (1910–1998)
- Qiao Ji (died 1345)
- Qin Hui (born 1953)
- Qin Jiushao (c. 1202 – 1261)
- Qu Bo (1923–2002)
- Qu Yuan (c. 340 BC–278 BC)
- Qu You (1341–1427)

=== R ===
- Ru Zhijuan (1925–1998)

=== S ===
- Sha Menghai (1900–1992)
- Shang Yang (d. 338 BC)
- Shao Yong (1011–1077)
- Shen Buhai (d. 337 BC)
- Shen Congwen (1902–1988)
- Shen Dao (c. 395–315 BC)
- Shen Quanqi (c. 650-729)
- Shen Rong (born 1936)
- Shen Shixi (born 1952)
- Shen Yin-mo (1883–1971) poet and calligrapher
- Shen Yue (441–513)
- Shen Zhou (1427–1509)
- Shi Naian (c. 1296 – 1372)
- Shi Kefa (1601–1645)
- Shi Shen (fl. 4th century BC)
- Shi Zhecun (1905–2003)
- Shide (fl. 9th century)
- Shiing-Shen Chern (1911–2004)
- Shing-Tung Yau (born 1949)
- Sima Guang (1019–1086)
- Sima Qian (145 BC–90 BC)
- Sima Xiangru (179–117 BC)
- Sima Zhen (fl. 8th century)
- Yum-Tong Siu (born 1943)
- Song Yingxing (1587–1666)
- Song Ci (1186–1249)
- Song Yu (fl. 3rd century BC)
- Song Zhiwen (660–712)
- Su Buqing (1902–2003)
- Su Hui (fl. 4th century)
- Su Manshu (1884–1918)
- Su Qing (1914–1982)
- Su Shi (1037–1101)
- Su Tong (born 1963)
- Su Xiaoxiao (fl. 4th century)
- Sunzi (fl. 6th century BC)
- Sunzi (fl. 3rd century)
- Sun Bin (d. 316 BC)
- Sun Simiao (581–682)
- Sun Guoting (646–691)
- Sun Guangyuan (1900–1979)

=== T ===
- Amy Tan (born 1952)
- Tan Sitong (1865–1898)
- Tang Xianzu (1550–1616)
- Tang Junyi (1909–1978)
- Tang Zhen (1630–1704)
- Tao Yuanming (365–427)
- Tian Han (1898–1968)
- Tie Ning (born 1957)

=== W ===
- Wang Anshi (1021–1086)
- Wang Anyi (born 1954)
- Wang Bi (226–249)
- Wang Bo (c. 649–676)
- Wang Changling (698–765)
- Wang Chong (27–97)
- Wang Chongyang (1113–1170)
- Wang Fanzhi (fl. 7th century)
- Wang Fuzhi (1619–1692)
- Wang Guowei (1877–1927)
- Wang Hao (1921–1995)
- Wang Huo (1924–2025)
- Wang Lixiong (born 1953)
- Wang Ruoshui (1926–2002)
- Wang Shifu (fl. 14th century)
- Wang Shuo (born 1958)
- Wang Wei (701–761)
- Wang Xizhi (303–361)
- Wang Xianzhi (344–386)
- Wang Xiaobo (1952–1997)
- Wang Yangming (1472–1529)
- Wang Zhen (fl. 14th century)
- Wang Zhen (1867–1938)
- Wei Zhuang (836–910)
- Wei Shuo (272–349)
- Wei Shou (506–572)
- Wei Zheng (580–643)
- Wei Boyang (fl. 2nd century)
- Wei Huacun (252–334)
- Wei Hui (born 1973)
- Wei Yuan (1794–1856)
- Wen Tianxiang (1236–1283)
- Wen Zhenheng (1585–1645)
- Wen Zhengming (1470–1559)
- Wen Yiduo (1899–1946)
- Woo Tsin-hang (1865–1953)
- Wu Cheng'en (c. 1500 – 1582)
- Wu Jiaji (1618–1684)
- Wu Jingzi (1701–1754)
- Wu Wenjun (1919–2017)
- Wu Qi (d. 381 BC)
- Wuzhun Shifan (1178–1249)

=== X ===
- Xi Kang (223–262)
- Xiao Hong (1911–1942)
- Xiao Jun (1907–1988)
- Xie Daoyun (fl. 4th century)
- Xie Lingyun (385–433)
- Xie He (fl. 5th century)
- Xin Qiji (1140–1207)
- Xiong Shili (1885–1968)
- Xiong Qinglai (1893–1969)
- Xu Youyu (born 1947)
- Xu Dishan (1893–1941)
- Xu Zhimo (1897–1931)
- Xu Xiake (1587–1641)
- Xue Zongzheng (born 1935)
- Xue Juzheng (912–981)
- Xue Tao (768–831)
- Xu Zaisi (fl. 14th century)
- Xu Guangqi (1562–1633)
- Xu Wei (1521–1593)
- Xu Yihua (1362–1407)
- Xunzi (c. 310–238 BC)

=== Y ===
- Yan Ge (born 1984)
- Geling Yan (born 1958)
- Yan Huiqing (1877–1950)
- Yan Li (1954–2026)
- Yan Lianke (born 1958)
- Yan Shigu (581–645)
- Yan Zhenqing (709–785)
- Yan Zhitui (531–591)
- Yang Borun (1837–1911)
- Yang Hui (c. 1238 – 1298)
- Yang Jianli (born 1963)
- Yang Jiang (1911–2016)
- Yang Rongguo (1907–1978)
- Yang Shuo (1913–1968)
- Yang Xiong (53 BC–18)
- Ye Shengtao (1894–1988)
- Ye Shi (1150–1223)
- Yi Xing (683–727)
- Yu Hao (fl. 10th century)
- Yu Dafu (1896–1945)
- Yu Hua (born 1960)
- Yu Huan (fl. 3rd century)
- Yu Shinan (558–638)
- Yu Xuanji (844–869)
- Yu Zhengxie (1775–1840)
- Yuan Hongdao (1568–1610)
- Yuan Mei (1716–1797)
- Yuan Zhen (779–831)

=== Z ===
- Zeng Jiongzhi (1898–1940)
- Zeng Gong (1019–1083)
- Zengzi (505–436 BC)
- Zhan Ruoshui (1466–1560)
- Zhan Tao (born 1963)
- Zhang Binglin (1868–1936)
- Zhang Chengzhi (born 1948)
- Zhang Henshui (1895–1967)
- Zhang Heng (78–139)
- Zhang Jie (born 1937)
- Zhang Ji (fl. 8th century)
- Zhang Kangkang (born 1950)
- Zhang Ling (born 1957)
- Zhang Ping (born 1953)
- Zhang Sixun (fl. 10th century)
- Zhang Tingyu (1672–1755)
- Zhang Wei (born 1955)
- Zhang Xianliang (1936–2014)
- Zhang Xu (fl. 8th century)
- Zhang Yanyuan (fl. 9th century)
- Zhang Yaotiao (fl. 9th century)
- Zhang Zhi (fl. 2nd century)
- Zhang Zai (1020–1077)
- Zhao Jingshen (1902–1985)
- Zhao Luanluan (fl. 13th century)
- Zhao Mengfu (1254–1322)
- Zhao Shuli (1906–1970)
- Zheng Xuan (127–200)
- Zheng Yuanjie (1955- ) fairy tales
- Zhong Hui (225–264)
- Zhong Xiaoyang (born 1962)
- Zhong Yao (151–230)
- Zhou Weihui (born 1973)
- Zhu Qianzhi (1899–1972)
- Zhu Shijie (fl. 13th century)
- Zhu Xueqin (born 1952)
- Zhu Xiao Di (born 1958)
- Zhu Yu (fl. 12th century)
- Zhu Ziqing (1898–1948)
- Zhuangzi (fl. 4th century BC)
- Zisi (c. 481–402 BC)
- Zhu Xi (1130–1200)
- Zhou Dunyi (1017–1073)
- Zhou Lianggong (1612–1672)
- Zhou Shoujuan (1895–1968)
- Zhou Weiliang (1911–1995)
- Zhou Zuoren (1885–1967)
- Zong Pu (born 1928)
- Zu Chongzhi (429–500)
- Zu Geng (fl. 5th century)

== See also ==
- Lists of authors
- List of China-related topics
- List of Chinese women writers
- List of Taiwanese writers
- List of Tibetan writers
