= List of writers by name: Z =

The following is a List of writers by name whose last names begin with Z:

Abbreviations: ch = children's; d = drama, screenwriting; f = fiction; nf = non-fiction; p = poetry, song lyrics

== Za–Zg ==
- Tymon Zaborowski (1799–1828, Russian E, p/d)
- Jonáš Záborský (1812–1876, Austria-Hungary, f/p/d)
- Vlado Žabot (born 1958, Yugoslavia/Slovenia, f/ch)
- Jan Zachariasiewicz (1823–1906, Austrian E, f)
- Rachel Zadok (born 1972, S Africa, f)
- Michael Zadoorian (born 1957, US, f)
- Raúl Zaffaroni (born 1940, Argentina, nf)
- Carlos Ruiz Zafón (1964–2020, Spain, f/ch)
- Jessica Zafra (born 1965, Philippines, f/nf)
- Haim Zafrani (1922–2004, Morocco/France, nf)
- Mohamed Zafzaf (1945–2001, Morocco, f/p)
- Adam Zagajewski (1945–2021, Poland, p/f/nf)
- Rania Zaghir (born 1977, Lebanon, ch)
- Stoyan Zagorchinov (1889–1969, Bulgaria, f/d/nf)
- Włodzimierz Zagórski (1834–1902, Austrian E/Russian E, f/nf/p)
- Rahimidin Zahari (1968–2015, Malaysia, p/d/f)
- Helen Zahavi (born 1966, England, f)
- Hamid Zaher (born 1974, Afghanistan/Canada, nf)
- Shahidul Zahir (1953–2008, E Pakistan/Bangladesh, f)
- Timothy Zahn (born 1951, US, f)
- Anna Zahorska (1882–1942, Poland, p/nf/d), Holocaust victim
- Stefania Zahorska (1890–1961, Austrian E/Poland, nf)
- Gabriel Zaid (born 1934, Mexico, p/nf)
- Feridun Zaimoğlu (born 1964, Turkey/Germany, p/f)
- Stoyan Zaimov (1853–1932, Bulgaria, nf)
- Dane Zajc (1929–2005, Yugoslavia/Slovenia, p/d)
- Janusz A. Zajdel (1938–1985, Poland, f)
- Moufdi Zakaria (1908–1977, Algeria, nf/p)
- Aly Zaker (1944–2020, India/Bangladesh, d/nf)
- Abed Elrahim Abu Zakrra (1943–1989, Sudan, p/nf)
- Mohammed ibn Qasim ibn Zakur (died 1708, Morocco, p/nf)
- Gonzalo Zaldumbide (1884–1965, Ecuador, nf)
- Maria Julia Zaleska (1831–1889, Russian E/Poland, nf)
- Carol Zaleski (living, US, nf)
- Józef Bohdan Zaleski (1802–1886, Russian E/France, p)
- Kazimierz Zalewski (1849–1919, Russian E/Poland, d/nf)
- Wacław Michał Zaleski (1799–1849, Austrian E, p/nf)
- Witold Zalewski (1921–2009, Poland, f/nf)
- Dina Zaman (born 1969, Malaysia, f/nf/p)
- Mohammad Hashem Zamani (1928–2005, Afghanistan/US, p/nf)
- Duiliu Zamfirescu (1858–1922, Wallachia/Romania, f/p/nf)
- Daisy Zamora (born 1950, Nicaragua, p)
- Adela Zamudio (1854–1928, Bolivia, p/nf), pseudonym Soledad
- Yevgeny Zamyatin (1884–1937, Russian E/France, f/nf)
- Vojtech Zamarovský (1919–2006, Czechoslovakia/Slovakia, nf)
- Nanda Thein Zan (1947–2011, Burma/Myanmar, nf)
- Joakim Zander (born 1975, Sweden, f/nf)
- Rebecca Zanetti (living, US, f)
- Israel Zangwill (1864–1926, England, nf)
- Louis Zangwill (1869–1938, England, f)
- Andrea Zanzotto (1921–2011, Italy, p)
- Luis Zapata (1951–2020, Mexico, f/d)
- Gabriela Zapolska (1857–1921, Austrian E/Poland, f/d/nf)
- Matthew Zapruder (born 1967, US, p)
- Ibn Abi Zar (died c. 1315, Morocco, nf)
- Spôjmaï Zariâb (born 1949 or 1952, Afghanistan/France, f)
- Rupen Zartarian (1874–1915, Ottoman E, p/f)
- Štefan Žáry (1918–2007, Czechoslovakia/Slovakia, p/nf)
- Marya Zaturenska (1902–1982, Russian E/US, p/nf)
- Zawgyi (1907–1990, Burma/Myanmar, p/nf/d)
- Kazimiera Zawistowska (1870–1902, Russian E, p)
- Abd al-Wahhab Abu Zayd (born 1970, Saudi Arabia, p)
- Amina Zaydan (born 1966, Egypt, f)
- Ibn Zaydan (1873–1946, Morocco, nf)
- Piotr Zbylitowski (1569–1649, Poland, d)
- Katarzyna Ewa Zdanowicz-Cyganiak (born 1979, Poland, p/nf)
- Kazimierz Zdziechowski (1878–1942, Russian E/Poland, nf/f), Holocaust victim
- Zeami Motokiyo (世阿弥元清, c. 1363 – c. 1443, Japan, nf/d)
- Zdenka Žebre (1920–2011, Yugoslavia/Slovenia, f/ch)
- George Zebrowski (born 1945, Austria/US, f)
- Joseph Christian Freiherr von Zedlitz (1790–1862, Austrian E/Austria, d/p)
- Hristofor Žefarović (died 1753, Ottoman E, nf/p)
- Emil Zegadłowicz (1888–1941, Austrian E/Poland, p/f/d)
- Roger Zelazny (1937–1995, US, p/f)
- Paul Tiyambe Zeleza (born 1955, Nyasaland/Malawi, f/nf)
- Gerasim Zelić (1752–1828, Habsburg E/Hungary, nf)
- Hana Zelinová (1914–2004, Czechoslovakia/Slovakia, f/d)
- Eva Zeller (1923–2022, Germany, f/p)
- Ludwig Zeller (1927–2019, Chile, p)
- Žemaitė (1845–1921, Russian E/Lithuania, f/nf/d), pseudonym of Julija Beniuševičiūtė-Žymantienė
- Robert Zend (1929–1985, Hungary/Canada, p/f)
- Zeng Baosun (曾寶蓀, 1893–1978, China, nf)
- Zeng Gong (曾鞏, 1019–1083, China, nf)
- Zengzi (曾子, 505–435 BCE, China, nf)
- Salem Zenia (born 1962, Algeria/Spain, nf)
- Zeno of Citium (c. 334 – c. 262 BCE, Cyprus/Greece, nf)
- Zeno of Elea (c. 495 – c. 430 BCE, Greece, nf)
- Benjamin Zephaniah (1958–2023, England, p)
- Berhanu Zerihun (1933/1934–1987, Ethiopia, f/nf)
- Irena Žerjal (born 1940, Italy, p/f)
- Stefan Żeromski (1864–1925, Russian E/Poland, f/d)
- Komninos Zervos (born 1950, Australia, p)
- Jens Zetlitz (1761–1821, Norway, p)
- Sarah Zettel (born 1966, US, f)
- Gabrielle Zevin (born 1977, US, f/ch)
- Zuzka Zguriška (1900–1984, Hungary/Czechoslovakia, f/d)

== Zh ==
- Zhai Yongming (翟永明, born 1955, China, p/nf/d)
- Zhan Ruoshui (湛若水, 1466–1560, China, nf)
- Zhan Tao (展涛, born 1963, China, nf)
- Zhang Binglin (章太炎, 1869–1936, China, nf)
- Zhang Chengzhi (张承志, born 1948, China, nf)
- Zhang Haidi (张海迪, born 1955, China, nf)
- Zhang Heng (張衡, 78–139 CE, China, nf/p)
- Zhang Henshui (张恨水, 1895–1967, China, f)
- Zhang Ji (張繼, fl. 8th c., China, p)
- Zhang Jie (張潔, 1937–2022, China, f)
- Zhang Kangkang (张抗抗, born 1950, China, nf)
- Zhang Ling (张翎, born 1957, China, f)
- Zhang Ping (張平, born 1953, China, f/nf)
- Zhang Sixun (張思訓, fl. 10th c., China, nf)
- Zhang Tingyu (張廷玉, 1672–1755, China, nf)
- Zhang Wei (張煒, born 1956, China, f/ch)
- Zhang Xianliang (张贤亮, 1936–2014, China, f/nf/p)
- Zhang Xinxin (張辛欣, born 1953, China, nf/f/d)
- Zhang Xu (張旭, fl. 8th c., China, p)
- Zhang Xuecheng (章學誠, 1738–1801, China, nf)
- Zhang Yanyuan (張彥遠, c. 815 – c. 877, China, nf)
- Zhang Yaotiao (張窈窕, fl. 9th c., China, p)
- Zhang Yueran (张悦然, born 1982, China, f)
- Zhang Zai (張載, 1020–1077, China, nf)
- Lijia Zhang (张丽佳, born 1964, China/England, nf)
- Empress Zhangsun (長孫皇后, 601–636, China, nf)
- Zhao Jingshen (趙景深, 1902–1985, China, f)
- Zhao Luanluan (趙鸞鸞, fl. 14th c., China, p)
- Zhao Luorui (趙蘿蕤, 1912–1998, China, p)
- Zhao Mengfu (趙孟頫, 1254–1322, China, nf)
- Zhao Shuli (趙樹理, 1906–1970, China, f)
- Zheng Min (郑敏, 1920–2022, China, nf/p)
- Zheng Xuan (康成, 127–200 CE, China, nf)
- Zheng Yuanjie (郑渊洁, born 1955, China, ch)
- Zheng Yunduan (郑允端, c. 1327–1356, China, p)
- Zhong Hui (鍾會, 225–264 CE, China, nf)
- Zhong Xiaoyang (鍾曉陽, born 1962, Hong Kong/Australia, f/p)
- Zhong Yao (鍾繇, 151–230 CE, China, p)
- Yilin Zhong (鍾宜霖, living, China/England, f/nf/p)
- Zhou Dunyi (周敦頤, 1017–1073, China, nf)
- Zhou Lianggong (周亮工, 1612–1672, China, p/nf)
- Zhou Shoujuan (周瘦鵑, 1895–1968, China, f/d)
- Zhou Wei Hui (周衛慧, born 1973, China, f)
- Zhu Lin (竹林, born 1949, China, f), born Wang Zuling, 王祖铃
- Zhu Qianzhi (朱謙之, 1899–1972, China, nf)
- Zhu Shijie (朱世傑, 1249–1314, China, nf)
- Zhu Shuzhen (朱淑真, c. 1135 – 1180, China, p)
- Zhu Xi (朱熹, 1130–1200, China, nf)
- Zhu Xiao Di (朱小棣, born 1958, China, nf/f)
- Zhu Xueqin (朱學勤, born 1952, China, nf)
- Zhu Yu (朱彧, fl. 12th c., China, nf)
- Zhu Ziqing (朱自清, 1898–1948, China, p/nf)
- Zhuang Zhou (莊周, c. 369 – c. 286 BCE, China, nf)
- Zhuo Wenjun (卓文君, fl. 2nd c. BCE, China, p)
- Zhou Zuoren (周作人, 1885–1967, China, nf)

== Zi–Zy ==
- May Ziadeh (1886–1941, Palestine/Egypt, p/nf)
- Youssef Ziedan (born 1958, Egypt, nf)
- Calvin Ziegler (1854–1930, US, p)
- Jean Ziegler (1934–2026, Switzerland, nf/f)
- Lode Zielens (1901–1944, Belgium, f)
- Rafał A. Ziemkiewicz (born 1964, Poland, nf/f)
- Lajos Zilahy (1891–1974, Hungary/US, f/d)
- Péter Zilahy (born 1970, Hungary, p/nf/d)
- Aleksandar Ziljak (born 1963, Yugoslavia/Croatia, f)
- Richard Zimler (born 1956, US, f/p/ch)
- Johann Georg Ritter von Zimmermann (1728–1795, Switzerland/Germany, nf)
- Alfred Eckhard Zimmern (1879–1957, England, nf)
- Alice Zimmern (1855–1939, England, nf)
- Helen Zimmern (1846–1934, Germany/England, ch/nf)
- Musaemura Zimunya (born 1949, S Rhodesia/Zimbabwe, p/nf)
- Haralamb Zincă (1923–2008, Romania, nf)
- Paul Zindel (1936–2003, US, d/ch)
- David Zindell (born 1952, US, f/nf)
- Mohammed Chaouki Zine (born 1972, Algeria, nf)
- Barnaba Zingani (born 1958, Nyasaland/Malawi, f/nf/ch)
- Willie Zingani (born 1954, Nyasaland/Malawi, f/p/d)
- Michelle Zink (living, US, f)
- Howard Zinn (1922 – 2010, US, nf/p)
- Sénouvo Agbota Zinsou (born 1946, Togo, d)
- Samuel Iga Zinunula (born 1964, Uganda, p)
- Nicolaus Zinzendorf (1700–1760, Germany, nf)
- Elvania Namukwaya Zirimu (1938–1979, Uganda, p/d)
- Pio Zirimu (died 1977, Uganda, nf)
- Zisi (子思;, c. 481–402 BCE, China, nf)
- Lewis Ziska (living, US, nf)
- Kathinka Zitz-Halein (1801–1877, Germany, p/f)
- Vasa Živković (1819–1891, Habsburg E/Austria-Hungary, p/nf)
- Zoran Živković (born 1948, Yugoslavia/Serbia, nf)
- Jovan Zivlak (born 1947, Yugoslavia/Serbia, p/nf)
- Branimir Živojinović (1930–2007, Yugoslavia/Serbia, p)
- Massuka Živojinović (1886–1974, Serbia/Yugoslavia, p/d/nf)
- Dinko Zlatarić (1558–1613, Ragusa, p/nf)
- Ciril Zlobec (1925–2018, Italy/Slovenia, p/f/nf)
- Jovan Jovanović Zmaj (1833–1904, Austria-Hungary, p/d/nf)
- Andrija Zmajević (1628–1694, Venetia, p)
- Narcyza Żmichowska (1819–1876, Russian E, f/p), pseudonym Gabryella
- Mohammed Zniber (1923–1993, Morocco, nf)
- Joseph Zobel (1915–2006, Martinique/France, f)
- Radovan Zogović (1907–1986, Montenegro/Yugoslavia, p)
- Émile Zola (1840–1902, France, f/d/nf)
- Albin Zollinger (1895–1941, Switzerland, f/p/nf)
- Charlotte Zolotow (1915–2013, US, ch)
- Zong Pu (宗璞, born 1928, China, f)
- Norbert Zongo (1949–1998, Burkina Faso, nf), pseudonym of Henri Segbo
- John Zosimus (died c. 990, Palestine, nf), Georgian name Ioane-Zosime
- Roland Zoss (born 1951, Switzerland/Italy, p/f)
- Fawzia Zouari (born 1955, Tunisia, nf)
- Abdallah Zrika (born 1953, Morocco, p)
- Miklós Zrínyi (1620–1664, Hungary, p/nf)
- Heinrich Zschokke (1771–1848, Germany/Switzerland, f/nf)
- Péter Zsoldos (1930–1997, Hungary, f)
- Béla Zsolt (1895–1949, Hungary, nf)
- Zu Chongzhi (祖沖之, 429–500 CE, China, nf)
- Zu Gengzhi (祖暅之, c. 480 – c. 525, China)
- Karl Zuchardt (1887–1968, Germany, f)
- Carl Zuckmayer (1896–1977, Germany/Switzerland, d)
- Louis Zukofsky (1904–1978, US, p)
- Jerzy Żuławski (1874–1915, Austrian E/Poland, p/d/f)
- Juliusz Żuławski (1910–1999, Poland, p/f/nf)
- Mirosław Żuławski (1913–1995, Russian E/Poland, f/nf/d)
- Zuo Fen (左芬, c. 255–300, China, p)
- Vitomil Zupan (1914–1987, Austrian E/Yugoslavia, nf), Holocaust survivor
- Katka Zupančič (1889–1967, Austrian E/US, p/ch)
- Oton Župančič (1878–1949, Austrian E/Yugoslavia, p/d)
- Gomes Eanes de Zurara (c. 1410 – c. 1474, Portugal, nf)
- Unica Zürn (1916–1970, Germany/France, p/f/nf)
- Markus Zusak (born 1975, Australia, f)
- Cvijeta Zuzorić (1552–1648, Ragusa, p)
- Joost Zwagerman (1963–2015, Netherlands, f/nf/p)
- Arnold Zweig (1887–1968, Germany, f/d/nf/p)
- Stefan Zweig (1881–1942, Austria/Brazil, f/d/nf)
- Stefanie Zweig (1932–2014, Kenya/Germany, f)
- Jan Zweyer (born 1953, Germany, nf), pseudonym of Rüdiger Richartz
- Rose Zwi (1928–2018, Mexico/Australia, f)
- Fay Zwicky (1933–2017, Australia, p/f/nf)
- Hans von Zwiedineck-Südenhorst (1845–1906, Germany/Austria, nf)
- Huldrych Zwingli (1484–1531, Switzerland, nf)
- Mujawar Ahmad Zyar (born 1937, Afghanistan, nf)
- Eugeniusz Żytomirski (1911–1975, Poland/Canada, p/d/f)
