= Ziar =

Ziar may refer to:

== People ==
- Mujawar Ahmad Ziar (born 1937), Afghan historian and linguist
- Rachid Ziar (born 1973), Algerian long-distance runner

== Places ==
- Ziar, Iran (disambiguation), various places in Iran
- Žiar (disambiguation), various places in Slovakia
