= Li Kaixian =

Chinese writer (1502–1568)

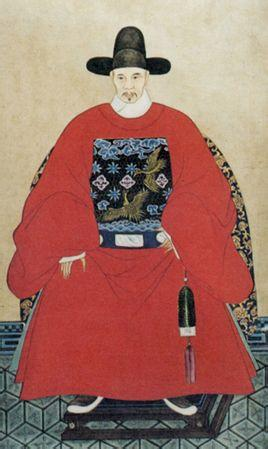
- Born: 1502
- Died: 1568 (aged 65–66)
- Occupation: Poet, Playwright

Li Kaixian (Chinese: 李開先, 1502 - 1568) was a Chinese writer, playwright and literary critic of the Ming dynasty from Shandong. He was retired from the government at age 39, and then devoted his life to literature and Chinese opera. He was a member of the circle of intellectuals gathered folk songs and ballads. His first play Sword was a chuanqi play. The play is based on the plot of the novel Water Margin, but the story of Lin Chong had been changed.

== Early life ==
Li Kaixian's mother, surname Wang (王), was the daughter of a wealthy family from Xinjie, who married his father at age 19. His father failed the provincial examination several times before eventually passing and going to the capital for the national examination. Li Kaixian received the degree of jinshi, the highest award for imperial examinations, and then entered the Ministry of Revenue.

== Career ==
In the late 1550s, Li Kaixian became interested in printing Yuan-dynasty qu, including sanqu and dramas. His publishing was complimented by his personal libraries of over 10,000 volumes, known as the "Library of Ten Thousand Fascicles". He also printed a number of plays in an anthology, Revised Plays by Yuan Masters (改定元賢傳奇; Gaiding Yuanxian chuanqi). Despite the anthology's importance, the whereabouts of the collection was unknown into the 20th century. It was believed to be in Taiwan, until it was revealed in 2001 that the existing edition is kept in Nanjing Library.

Although the surviving edition of the anthology preserves only 6 plays, the preface states that Li Kaixian intended to print 16. Li Kaixian also stated that he was the sponsor of the project and provided texts from his own personal collection, with assistance from his disciple Zhang Zishen, a native of Shanghe known for his expertise in northern qu, and Gao Yingqi (高應玘).

Following the printing of the anthology, Li Kaixian continued printing suites of songs and xiaoling (小令); in 1566 and 1567 he printed collections by Yuan masters Zhang Keiju (張可久) and Qiao Ji, respectively.
