= Liu Cha =

Tang dynasty poet

Liu Cha (simplified Chinese: 刘叉; traditional Chinese: 劉叉; 8th–9th cent.) was a Tang dynasty poet. His birth and death dates, courtesy name, and place of origin are all unknown. He was active during the Yuanhe era.

== Life and work ==
Liu Cha was known for his bold and independent spirit and enjoyed critiquing his contemporaries. The poet Han Yu, who was renowned for welcoming scholars from across the realm, attracted Liu Cha's admiration; he traveled to meet him and composed the poems Bingzhu (冰柱; “Icicles”) and Xueche (雪车; “Sleigh”), both included in the Quan Tangshi (全唐诗), gaining a reputation surpassing that of Lu Tong and Meng Jiao. Later, because he was dissatisfied with Han Yu for writing a flattering text for the tomb, he seized the payment he had received for the epitaph and left, returning to the Qi and Lu regions, after which his fate is unknown.

The Hanyu da zidian (HYDZD) is referring to the Liu Cha shiji 刘叉诗集 (Liu Cha’s Collected Poems) in the edition of the Tang baijia shi 唐百家诗.

== See also ==
- Complete Tang Poems

== Bibliography ==
- Quan Tangshi 全唐詩/juan 卷 395 (Wikisource)
- Hanyu da zidian. 1993 (one-volume edition)
