= Li Shicen =

Chinese philosopher and editor

Li Shicen (Chinese: 李石岑; pinyin: Lǐ Shícén; Wade–Giles: Li Shih-ts'en, 27 December 1892 – 28 October 1934), born Li Bangfan (李邦藩), was a Chinese philosopher, anarchist, and editor of advanced philosophical journals of the May Fourth Movement, such as Minduo Magazine (The People's Tocsin) and Education Magazine. Li is best remembered as an exponent of the thought of Nietzsche, who was among the Western thinkers most influential in China in the early Republican era. Like many other Chinese intellectuals of his time, he embraced the Aesthetic Education Movement. Among other journals, he edited The Principles of Aesthetic Education.

Li Shicen belonged to circle of radical intellectuals and activists who emerged in Hunan in the early 20th century. Another was Mao Zedong. Li in fact had several contacts with Mao; as both young men wrote manuals on swimming, and Mao's later widely publicized exploit of swimming in the Yangtze River may be traced back to Li's inspiration.

== Early life ==
Li Shicen was born in Liling, Hunan on 27 December 1892. He studied privately with tutors before moving to Changsha, the provincial capital, to continue his education.

At the end of 1912, he went to Japan and began his studies at the Tokyo Advanced Normal School. There, he became close friends with Liu Shipei and the Japanese anarchist Ōsugi Sakae.

He established the journal The People's Tocsin in Japan in 1916. The journal was banned by the Japanese government and resumed publication in Shanghai after Li's return to China. Following his departure from Japan in the spring of 1920, Li worked as a university professor and as editor at, among other publishers, Shanghai Commercial Press, where he was editor in chief. In 1920, after delivering a speech at the First Normal School, Mao Zedong and his friends asked Li Shicen to teach them Western-style swimming techniques, and the group swam in the Xiang River together.

Li produced a number of books and articles which are still read as expositions of Western philosophy, and are of value in understanding the reception of ideas in this era. Rensheng Zhexue (人生哲学, "Philosophies of Human Life") was his longest published work. Li produced special issues of Min Duo devoted to a number of influential philosophers including Nietzsche, Bergson and Eucken. In the early 1920s, Li's circle of friends and acquaintances included Guo Moruo and Zhu Qianzhi.

Following a trip to Europe to study philosophy at his own expense in 1928, Li returned to China and announced that materialist dialectics was the "philosophy of the future". This conversion from neo-romanticism to Marxism was seen as a signal event at the time, and was a harbinger of many that were follow.

Prior to this he had been involved in scandal involving a female student. He published a Qingbian Wanzi Shu (情变万言书, "Ten Thousand Word Letter of Heartbreak") in response, and which expresses a neo-romantic philosophy typical of the era.

== Philosophy ==
Li adopted Nietzsche's understanding of nihilism and strongly criticized Confucian values, as well as the "Chinese propensity to associate individualism with self interest". However his work did not pit Western individualism against Chinese collectivism; what he criticized was the tendency to equate individualism with self-interest in a way that failed to acknowledge that "self-affirmation can also provide a way of acknowledging one's responsibility to one's environs". He also rejected the view that Nietzsche's beliefs were responsible for either World War I or German militarism.

During his life, he was one of the few Chinese philosophers who systematically studied Western thought. He worked to systematically introduce the work of Western philosophers, particularly Nietzsche, to the Chinese reading audience. He served as the editor in chief of The People's Tocsin, an influential journal, and contributed both an article and a bibliography on Nietzsche for a special issue in 1920.

== Works ==
Li Shicen wrote widely on other philosophers. A collection of Li's articles was first published in 1924, beginning with an essay on the pragmatism of William James and the intuitionism of Henri Bergson. He was particularly laudatory of Bergson, whom he referred to as a "second Kant" and a "second Aristotle", and had a favourable view of his theory of élan vital. The collection also included chapters on Nietzsche's Übermensch, Rudolf Christoph Eucken, John Dewey, and Bertrand Russell.

=== Bergson and Confucianism ===
Li connected Bergson's ideas with passages in Confucian classics that discussed the procreative power of the cosmos. He proposed that a fertility cult, rather than phallocentrism, underlined Confucius's ideas about life as the great virtue of earth and heaven. He also proposed the philosopher Dai Zhen as an intermediary figure, which Zhu Qianzhi had previously discussed. Dai Zhen had advocated the "fulfillment of life"; for Li Shicen, this advocacy was close to a call for individualist liberation in a collectivist society.

== Later life ==
Li Shicen died at age 42 on 28 October 1934.
