= Gao Lian (writer) =

Chinese writer, dramatist and encyclopedist

Gao Lian (Chinese: 高濂; pinyin: Gāo Lián; Wade–Giles: Kao Lien, fl. 16th century), was a Chinese writer, dramatist and encyclopedist.

Gao Lian was born in Qiantang (钱塘 - present day Hangzhou). His courtesy name was Shenfu (深甫) and his pseudonym was Ruinan Daoren (瑞南道人). He is known to have written the plays Jiexiaoji (节孝记) and Yuzanji (玉簪记, "The Jade Hairpin"). Of the two, he is most noted for latter, a romantic drama about a young impoverished scholar and a Daoist nun. The piece remains a classic of the Ming period theater in thirty-three scenes, some of which are still performed today. In his discussion of mental illness (hsin-ping), he successfully diagnosed the condition now known as bipolar disorder. Gao advised his readers to avoid abortion and show concern for the elderly and physically weak. He suggested people attach themselves to a major religious system or their inner emptiness will invite some manner of physical disease. His works detail early 17th century aesthetics and material culture such as garden architecture, tea culture and dwarf trees. The above items were additional examples of his overall aim at the maintenance of bodily health through a quiet enjoyment of human life.

== Career ==
Professionally, Gao remained largely outside of official circles and is an example of a Buyi Wenren (布衣文人) or commoner literatus, many of whom lived in the 17th century. His writing suggests that he was a resident of Hangzhou with his details of the area. Gao’s encyclopedia, Zunsheng Bajian (遵生八笺, "Eight Treatises on the Nurturing of Life"), was first published in 1591 and reprinted at least twice more before 1620. The eight discourses are as follows:

1. On sublime theories of pure self-cultivation
2. On being in harmony with the four seasons
3. On comport on rising and resting [including one's surroundings, or what we might call interior design, of contemporary rather than ancient manufacture]
4. On extending life and avoiding disease
5. On food and drink
6. On pure enjoyment of cultured idleness [including art collecting, connoisseurship]
7. On numinous and arcane elixirs and medicines
8. On remote wanderings beyond the mundane
