= Wu Jiaji =

Chinese poet

Wu Jiaji (Chinese: 吳嘉紀; Wade–Giles: Wu Chia-chi, 1618–1684) was a Chinese poet, and an associate of the official and literary figure Zhou Lianggong.

Wu's writings provide us with a glimpse of conditions just prior to the Manchu Qing conquest and especially descriptions of social conditions in rural society. Wu was from Taizhou, Jiangsu, an area already known for radical intellectualism. The area had once experienced economic prosperity, but by the 17th century was in decline.

Wu lived in the midst of poverty in a dilapidated home with broken tiles. Members of the local community still attempted to uphold old standards of education and culture. The area was one of salt production and Wu's ancestors engaged in this profession. Wu himself engaged in variety of occupations. It is popular to view Wu, and others of his station, as hermits in protest against the newly established Manchu regime. Wu's accounts of China's new masters on a local level are of course revealing. Among Wu's associates were seal carvers who came to the attention of the scholar Zhou Lianggong. Zhou would publish a collection of their biographies, the Yinren Zhuan (印人传).
