= Su Manshu =

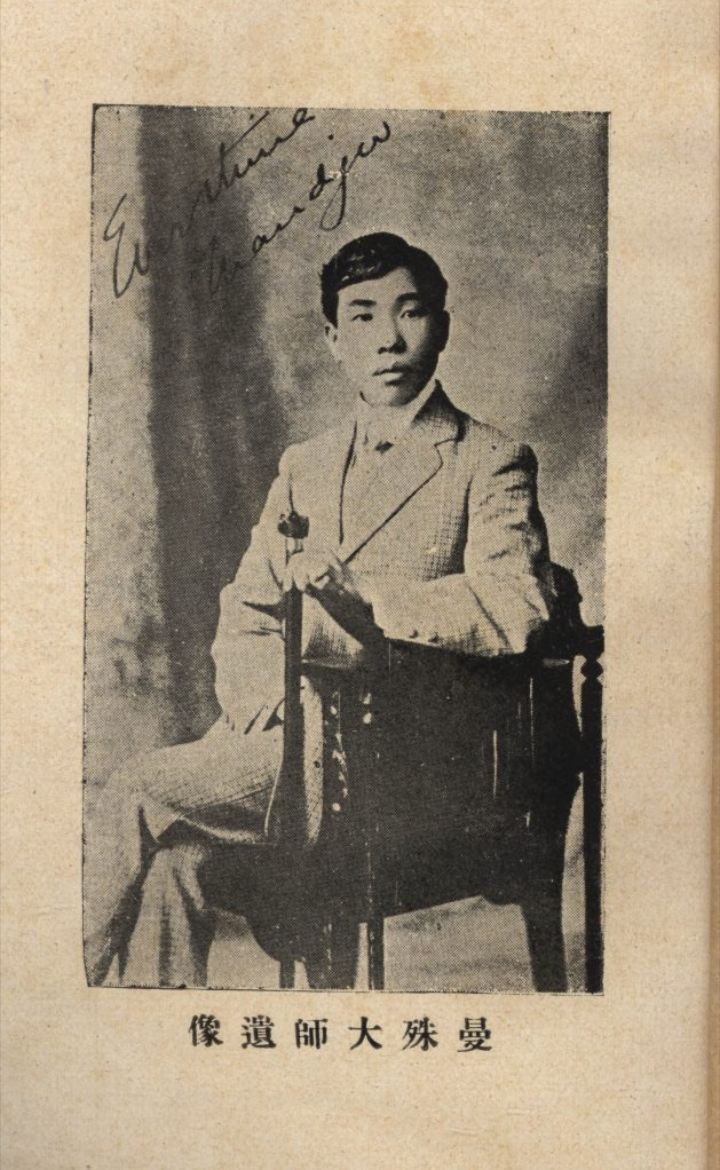
Portrait of Su Manshu

Su Manshu (traditional Chinese: 蘇曼殊; simplified Chinese: 苏曼殊; pinyin: Sū Mànshū, 1884–1918) was a Chinese writer, poet, painter, revolutionist and translator; his original name was Su Xuanying (Chinese: 蘇玄瑛; pinyin: Sū Xuányīng). Su had been named as a writer of poetry and romantic love stories in the history of early modern Chinese literature. However, he was most commonly known as a Buddhist monk, a poetry monk, "the monk of sentiment" (Chinese: 情僧; pinyin: qíng sēng) and "the revolutionary monk" (Chinese: 革命僧; pinyin: gémìng sēng). Su was born out of wedlock in Yokohama, Japan in 1884. His father was a Cantonese merchant, and his mother was his father's Japanese maid. His ancestral home was in Zhongshan city, Guangdong Province, China. He died at the age of 34 due to a stomach disease in Shanghai.

== Life and career ==
=== Education ===
Su had a good master of painting and language. He mastered many languages—English, French, Japanese and Sanskrit. In 1896, he went to Shanghai with his uncle and aunt to study in the British con-cession when he was thirteen years old. Later, in 1898, he went to Yokohama, Japan, to study at the School of Universal Harmony (Da Tong School 大同學校). In 1902, he continued to study in the special program for Chinese students at Waseda University ( 早稻田大學 ).

=== Buddhism ===
He became a Buddhist monk three times during his life; once at the age of 12 in 1895, later in 1899, and again in 1903, and adopted Su Manshu as a Buddhist name. He studied in Japan and traveled to many Buddhist countries including India, and Java. In 1895, Su fell ill and nearly died due to lack of care from his family, which resulted in his resorting to Buddhism. However, Su did not follow the rules of Buddhism so he was expelled. In 1898, Su suffered a serious setback in his romantic relationship with a Japanese girl named Jingzi. Jinzi's family forced her to leave Su, but she could not bear the great pressure and soon died. After facing this suffering, Su resorted to Buddhism again as a spiritual consolation for a short period. In 1913, Su felt disappointed about the political and social situation, in which the Qing government perpetually banned anti-government remarks in the revolutionary newspaper. So he returned to the temple in Guangdong for the rest of his life.

=== Career ===
Su was the most famous prose translator and his masterworks include Selected poems of Byron and Les Miserables. In 1903, he serialized his incomplete translation of Les Miserable World in The China National Gazette ( 國民日日報 ) and then published it in 1904. Su also translated quite a few poems by foreign romantic poets from Lord Byron and then published a collection of the translations entitled Selected Poems of Byron (拜倫詩選) in 1908. In 1911, some of these translations were published again in an anthology entitled Chao Yin(Voice of the tide). In 1911 or 1912, Su wrote and published his first as well as a most celebrated semi-autobiographical romance novel, Duan Hong Ling Yan Ji (The Lone Swan).

== Literature work ==
=== Duan Hong Ling Yan Ji ===
The Duan Hong Ling Yan Ji (Chinese: 斷鴻零雁記; pinyin: duàn hóng líng yàn jì) was written in classical literary styles and translated into English by George Kin Leung as The Lone Swan in 1929. The novel depicts tragic love stories between a young man and two young ladies, both of whom wholeheartedly fall in love with him. The young man is a monk just like Su, who cannot marry either of the two young ladies, which results in a tragic ending. The similarity between the novel with The Dream of the Red Chamber has led scholars to conclude that Su was much influenced by it. And The Lon Swan is one of the forefathers of the Mandarin Ducks and Butterflies school.

=== Selected Poems of Lord Byron ===
The Selected Poems of Lord Byron (Chinese: 拜倫詩選; pinyin: bài lún shī xuǎn) was published in the Chinese empire Hsuantung the first year (in 1909) and translated into Chinese in the form of classical Chinese poetry such as The Isles of Greece and My Native Land, Good Night.

=== Les Miserables ===
The translation of Les Miserables was published in the Chinese empire Guangxu 29th year (in 1903). It was serialized in 國民日日報 (English: The China National Gazette ) with a translated title 慘社會 (English: Miserable Society) in Shanghai.

== Influences ==
=== New Culture Movement and May Fourth Movement ===
Su was involved in revolutionary activity against the Qing Dynasty writing articles and papers. His poems integrated the core of classical Chinese literature and his collocation influenced the New Culture Movement in the early years of the Republic of China. His novels echoed those of the May Fourth Movement writers in criticism of the traditional family. Like writers such as Hu Shi, Wu You and Ba Jin, Su depicted family as an arena beset with cruelty, where authorities abused the younger generations for their own self-interests. He showed how family authority can inflict pain on young people by preventing their desire for romantic love. Although he focused on the pains of the sentimental characters’ personalities, he advocated that individuals could pursue what they wanted.
