= Huang Yuanyong =

Chinese author and journalist

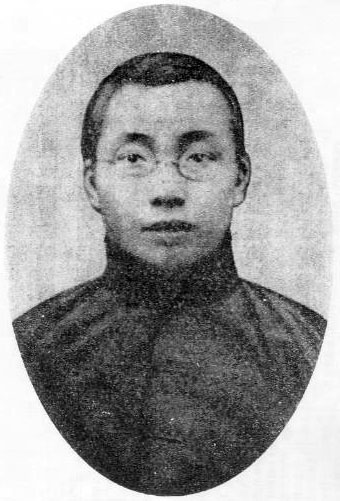
- Born: 15 January 1885; Jiujiang, Jiangxi Province, China
- Died: 25 December 1915 (aged 30); San Francisco, California, United States
- Cause of death: Shot in an unsolved assassination
- Occupations: Author; Journalist

Huang Yuanyong (黃遠庸), (Pen name: Huang Yuansheng 黃遠生, Wade-Giles: "Huang Yüan-yung") (15 January 1885 – 25 December 1915) was a renowned Chinese author and journalist during the late Qing dynasty (清朝) and early Republic of China (民國初年). Huang made significant contributions to journalism and literacy in China, particularly as an innovator in both journalistic methodology and writing style. His unsolved assassination while visiting San Francisco, California, United States, was suspected of having been a KMT operation.

== Early life ==
Huang Yuanyong (Given name: Huang Weiji 黃為基) was born to an educated family in Jiujiang (九江), Jiangxi Province (江西省) in China. His father was a scholar and an officer in charge of foreign affairs in Ningbo (寧波), and a number of his family members were government officials. Influenced by his family, Huang immersed himself in Chinese classics when he grew up. To improve his English, his family hired a foreign tutor to teach him the language.

Huang completed secondary schooling in the Zhejiang (淅江) province. During his studies at Zhejiang Wuxing Nanxun Government School (浙江吳興南潯公學), he was involved in educational reform campaigns and became a member of the Progressive Party (進步黨). In 1903, Huang came in seventh place in the regional examination in Jiangxi (江西). Nevertheless, the 19-year-old Huang did not follow the custom of becoming a government official, instead continuing his legal study at Chuo University in Tokyo, Japan. Six years later, he returned to China and started working at the Civil Postal Department (郵傳部). Later on, he became a journalist and worked for several different papers and news agencies. Huang was particularly famous for his discussions of politics and social issues.

== Life as a journalist ==
=== Background ===
Following the collapse of the Qing dynasty, Huang ceased his work as an officer in the new government of the Republic of China. Li Shengduo (李盛鐸), one of the Beiyang five ministers (北洋五大臣), played an influential role for Huang. He advised Huang to enter journalism, saying that "In western countries, the majority of journalists are familiar with history and international affairs. If you choose to work in this field, there is no doubt you will become a famous reporter." After receiving Li's advice, Huang began his career as a journalist.

Huang soon won recognition for his abilities as a journalist. In 1912, the founding year of the Republic of China, Huang, Lan Gongwu (藍公武) and Zhang Junmai (張君勱), who were known as "The trio of youth for modern China" (新中國三少年), first published Shao Nian Zhong Guo Weekly 《少年中國周刊》 to criticise politics. Later on, Huang and two other young journalists, Liu Shaoshao (劉少少) and Ding Foyan (丁佛言), were entitled '"The outstanding trio of journalism" (新聞界三傑).

Huang was also regarded as "The first genuine reporter in the modern context in China" (中國第一個真正現代意義上的記者) and his Yuansheng Tongxun (遠生通訊), a special column of news dispatch, became the most popular and famous brand in Chinese journalism.

=== Contribution to newspapers and Magazines ===
Huang's first job was to write articles for the Ya Shi Ya' Daily News (亞細亞日報) in Shanghai. The positions at newspapers and magazines that he later served include:

- Shen Bao (申報) - newspaper reporter
- Shi Bao (時報) - newspaper reporter
- Dong Fang Daily News (東方日報) - newspaper reporter
- Shao Nian Zhong Guo Weekly (少年中國周刊) - founder and magazine editor
- Yong Yan (庸言) - magazine editor
- Dong Fang Magazine (東方雜誌) - writer
- Lun Heng (論衡) - writer
- Guo Min Gong Bao (國民公報) - writer

With his academic background and work experiences, Huang took up a number of roles in the field. He worked as a chief editor (主編), an appointed regional reporter in Beijing (駐京記者) and Shanghai, and a freelance article writer (自由撰稿人). He was well known for being diversified and productive. In 1915, Huang's clash with Yuan Shikai (袁世凱) eventually cost him his job. The news of Huang being shot to death in the United States shortly after his arrival shocked the press and literary circles of China.

=== Publications ===
Among Huang's publications,Yuansheng yi zhu 《遠生遺著》 is a collection which consists of 239 pieces of his posthumous articles. It was published by Huang's friend, Lin Zhijun (林志鈞), after Huang's death in 1919. From 1920 to 1927, four editions of this book were published by the Commercial Press of Shanghai (商務印書館，上海). It was the first collection of news articles in Chinese publishing history. Huang's articles included news reporting, political analysis, and the like. The majority of Huang's articles were reports of major events and influential people in the turbulent politics of China at the time.

His publications on political issues include:

- A Warning to the Trio Superpower 《對於三大勢力之警告》
- An Overview of Current Politics 《最近之大勢》
- Astray Official 《官迷論》
- Conflict between Traditional and Contemporary Thoughts 《新舊思想之衝突》
- New Year in Beijing 《北京之新年》
- Three Days' Astronomy 《三日觀天記》
- The Chef of the Ambassador 《外交部之厨子》

His other publications include:

- My Confession 《懺悔錄》
- Introspection 《反省》
- Passive Optimism 《消極之樂觀》

As a journalist, he interviewed many important figures of the time, including:

- Sun Yat-sen (孫中山)
- Huang Xing (黃興)
- Song Jiaoren (宋教仁)
- Chang Taiyen (章太炎)
- Cai Yuanpei (蔡元培)
- Yuan Shikai (袁世凱)
- Li Yuanhong (黎元洪)
- Tang Shaoyi (唐紹儀)
- Lu Zhengxiang (陸征祥)
- Zhao Bingkwun (趙秉鈞)
- Xiong Xiling (熊希齡)
- Duan Qirui (段祺瑞)

Huang reported on many important events in China. For example:

- The assassination of Song Jiaoren (宋教仁被剌殺)
- The resignation of Yuan Shikai (袁內閣兩次倒台)
- The signing of The Twenty-One Demands (喪權辱國的二十一條)
- The resignation of Tang Shaoyi (唐紹儀請辭)

=== Clash with Yuan Shikai ===
Huang initially supported the creation of the Republic of China under Yuan Shikai's leadership. However, the new government became a great disappointment to Huang. He felt that despite the Progressive Party's rhetoric it was still a corrupt organization.

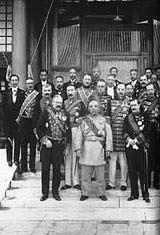
Yuan Shikai (center) with foreign embassy

In the articles entitled Big Loan Incident (大借款事件) and The Twenty-One Demands (喪權辱國的二十一條), Huang described Yuan's alleged secret deals with foreign powers and betrayal of the nation's interest for his own sake. Huang once described the status of the government as "idealess, dead-ended and hopeless" (無理想, 無解決, 無希望的政府). However, what most upset Huang was the threat to the freedom of the press that he felt Yuan represented. Under Yuan, journalists were prohibited from attending political meetings (政治會議) and the censorship of newspapers also became the custody of the Police Authority (警察官署).

Between 1912 and 1916 Yuan and his party extended their control over the news media, banning 71 newspapers and arresting more than 60 journalists. These events left Huang with a much more pessimistic view of the importance of journalism.

The incident which triggered the final clash of Huang and Yuan occurred in 1915. At that time, news media sympathetic to Yuan had been promoting his plan to revive the monarchic system in China. At first, he offered Liang Qichao (梁啟超) two hundred thousand dollars to write an article in favour of him, but Liang refused. Then he approached Huang due to Huang's reputation. Yuan offered him ten thousand dollars to become a minister and the chief editor of Ya Shi Ya Daily News (亞細亞日報), which was under his control. Still, Huang was unwilling to violate his principles as a journalist. Huang posted his announcement entitled My declaration of opposing the monarchic system and resignation from all positions of Yuan's group of publishers 《黃遠生反對帝制並辭去袁系報紙聘約啟事》 in most major newspapers in Shanghai, including Shen Bao (申報). Huang published further similar announcements in several papers, including Shen Bao (申報) and Shi Shi Xin Bao (時事新報) to clarify his political break from Yuan.

Yuan maintained pressure on Huang by naming him chief editor of Ya Shi Ya Daily News against his will, a position which Huang rejected. Eventually, though, Huang tried to escape this political battle, devoting himself to further academic studies.

== Influence on China ==
=== Journalism ===
Huang's writings were an important element in transforming traditional China into its modern form. Huang and other famous journalists such as Kang Youwei (康有為) and Liang Qichao (梁啟超) formed the Group of Journalists (報人集團), which played an important role in late Qing dynasty. As the educated ones, the group's opinions towards the society would be released to the public so that the dark side of the nation could be disclosed, enhancing the public's awareness of social issues. The group was undeniably a major breakthrough in China's journalistic history.

Huang was most active before and after the Xinhai Revolution (辛亥革命). That period was a dark age for cultural development in China, with interference from the past and the present, China and the West. Huang showed his concern and worries in that period through his writings. Strictly speaking, there was nobody who would write as many articles as Huang did at that time.

Huang emphasized that a journalist should be equipped with four important abilities:

- The ability to think critically (腦筋能想)
- The ability to run (腿腳能奔走) - to develop and broaden interpersonal network to enrich news sources
- The ability to listen (耳能聽即) - to analyze and co-ordinate trivial pieces into consequence
- The ability to write (手能寫即) directly, without distortion

=== Literature ===
Many intellectuals such as Chen Duxiu (陳獨秀) were influenced by Huang's ideas. They organized and published "New Youths" 《新青年》 and "New current of ideas" 《新潮》, which were largely promoted in Shanghai. More than thirty articles in the two publications mentioned Huang's name and his innovative ideas. One famous intellectual, Hu Shih (胡適), even considered Huang as the "First Voice" of promoting a new type of literature in his book Wu shi nian lai zhi wen xue (Literature within fifty years) 《五十年來之文學》.

Huang has been regarded as the pioneer of the May Fourth Movement (五四運動). He termed the movement a "Chinese Renaissance" in 1915 before it had actually started. He advocated the Literary Enlightenment Movement (文藝啟蒙運動) by promoting modern Chinese literature and introducing Western ideas to China. In his article, My Confession 《懺悔錄》, he argued that a prerequisite for the betterment of the society is to improve the personality and quality of citizens. ("今日無論何等方面，自以改革為第一要義", 要改革國家).

=== Education ===
A Painting of Imperial Examination

Although Huang achieved a good result in the Imperial Examination himself, he was highly critical of the system. Instead, he stated that after the collapse of the Qing dynasty, the examination system should also eventually be removed. Although new examination systems and schools were immediately introduced to China following the collapse, there were still a large number of people who gained nothing in the old system and could not fit into the new one. Huang argued that these people would become a threat to society.

=== Writing ===
Before becoming a journalist Huang immersed himself in writing literature, as classical Chinese literature was still popular in the late Qing dynasty. He was known for writing fluently, with major use of rhetoric and allusion.

However, Huang realized that news articles should be comprehensible enough to be read by many people and that the use of classical Chinese language might obstruct the flow of expression. He therefore decided to change his style of writing. By writing in simple and colloquial language, Huang's articles magnified his critical and satirical attitude.

== Mystery of his death ==
Huang was assassinated while visiting San Francisco, United States on Christmas Day, 25 December 1915, at the age of 30.

The circumstances of Huang's death remain a mystery, not only because there was political instability in China, but also because he was assassinated in San Francisco, far from his home. As a result, there are several possible explanations for the incident.

There were two versions of the story of the murder of Huang. One possibility is that Huang was shot by a killer sent by Yuan Shikai as payback for Huang's opposition to Yuan's monarchic system. Another version was that he was mistakenly assassinated by Liu Beihai (劉北海), a member of the Zhonghua Revolutionary Party (中華革命黨), which was later known as the Nationalist Party (國民黨). The Party suspected that Huang was indeed working for Yuan, and his purpose for visiting the U.S. was to promote the monarchic system. However, there is still not enough evidence to prove that Huang's death was related to Yuan, even today.

The date of Huang's assassination has also been called into some doubt. In the introduction of Yuansheng yi zhu 《遠生遺著》, a posthumous collection of Huang's articles, Lin Zhijun (林志鈞) recalled that he had heard the news on the night of 27 December 1915, and gives this date as the day of Huang's death. However, some scholars, including Li Shengduo (李盛鐸), believed that Huang was indeed killed on 25 December, as the date the news came did not necessarily have to be the day of the assassination. Therefore, generally, it has been accepted that the date of Huang's death was 25 December 1915.

== See also ==
- List of journalists killed in the United States
- List of unsolved murders (1900–1979)
