= Anthony (writer) =

Chinese young adult fiction writer (born 1984)

- Born: Ma Liang; 1984 (age 41–42); Dalian, China
- Occupation: Writer
- Writing career
- Language: Chinese and English
- Genre: Young adult fiction
- Notable works: A Journey, through Time, with Anthony; Picturing My Love, Honey

Ma Liang (Chinese: 马亮; born 1984), who writes under the pen name Anthony (安东尼), is a Chinese young adult fiction writer. Anthony was born in Dalian, China, then went to Melbourne, Australia, to study, majoring in hotel management.

== Major works ==
He is best known for his first book, A Journey, through Time, with Anthony, published in 2008. The book was made into a movie, Les Aventures d'Anthony, released in November 2015.

In 2010, Anthony published his second book, Picturing My Love, Honey, a collaboration with the illustrator Echo. It has sold more than 800,000 copies.

== Education ==
Ma graduated from Liaoning University and attended the University of Melbourne, majoring in hotel management.
