= Chang Hsin-hai =

Chinese scholar and writer

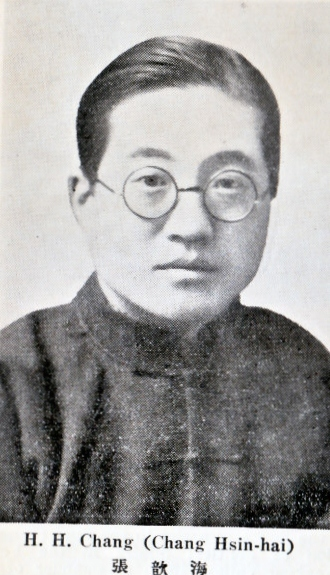
《中國名人錄》第四版(1931年)

Chang Hsin-hai (simplified Chinese: 张歆海; traditional Chinese: 張歆海; pinyin: Zhāng Xīnhǎi; June 25, 1898 – December 6, 1972), also known as H. H. Chang, was an early 20th century Chinese scholar and writer.

== Early life and academic training ==
Chang Hsin-hai was born June 25, 1898, in Shanghai, China. After studying at Songhua College in Peking from 1916 to 1918, he relocated to the United States to complete his higher education. He received an A.B. from Johns Hopkins University in 1919, an A.M., and a Ph. D. in English literature (under the supervision of Irving Babbitt) from Harvard University in 1920 and 1923, respectively. While completing his doctoral work, Chang served as an attache to the Chinese Delegation at the Washington Disarmament Conference in 1921.

== Chinese professorship and governmental work ==
Chang returned to China and was appointed professor and chairman of English Literature at Peking National University in 1926. From the years 1928 to 1937 Chang's occupation was governmental rather than academic: he served as the Director of the European and American Department (a subdivision of the Chinese Ministry of Foreign Affairs) from 1928 to 1933 and was the Chinese Minister Plenipotentiary to Portugal, Poland, and Czechoslovakia from 1933 to 1937. He entered the Chinese academic world once more, serving as Professor of Western Literature at University of Nanjing, from 1937 to 1940.

== Return to the United States and death ==
Chang came back to the United States in 1941 to serve as a lecturer on the Chinese war effort. This was his occupation until 1945. Despite his return to academics, Chang maintained ties to the diplomatic sphere. He was a special assistant to the Foreign Minister T. V. Soong in 1943, and was the director of the Chinese United Nations Association from 1947 to 1948. He held a position briefly as a research professor at Long Island University from 1951 to 1953 before joining the faculty of Fairleigh Dickinson University (New Jersey) as a professor of the humanities and East Asian History. This professorship was his last position, one that he held until 1969. Chang died in December 1972 at the age of 74. He passed while in Shanghai on an official visit to the People's Republic of China.

== Personal life ==
Chang married Sang-mi Han in 1927. They remained together until the time of his death. He had two children, a son David, and a daughter, Yi-an. While holding his American professorships, Chang lived at 220 Schenck Avenue, Great Neck, Long Island, New York.

== Works ==
- Chiang Kai-shek : Asia's man of destiny (1944), Doubleday, New York City
- Letters From a Chinese Diplomat (1948), Shanghai, Chinese American Pub, China
- The Fabulous Concubine (1956), Simon & Schuster, Oxford University Press (1987)
- Within Four Seas (1958), Simon & Schuster
- America and China: a new approach to Asia (1966), Simon & Schuster
