= Zhang Zhi (calligrapher) =

Chinese calligrapher

Zhang Zhi (simplified Chinese: 张芝; traditional Chinese: 張芝; pinyin: Zhāng Zhī; Wade–Giles: Chang Chih, died 192), courtesy name Boying (伯英), was a Chinese calligrapher during the Han dynasty. Born in Jiuquan, Gansu, (Note: This is per Zhang Huan's biography in Houhanshu. According to Qing-era scholar Qian Daxin, the Zhang family was from Yuanquan (渊泉). In his annotations to Zizhi Tongjian, Hu Sanxing wrote (in vol.56) that Zhang Huan was from Yuanquan (奂，炖煌渊泉人。).) he was a pioneer of the modern cursive script, and was traditionally honored as the Sage of Cursive Script (草聖). Furthermore, he is known as one of the Four Talented Calligraphers (四賢) in Chinese calligraphy.

== Biography ==
Zhang Zhi was the eldest son of Zhang Huan (张奂; 104-181), a military general; Zhang Zhi's younger brother Zhang Chang (张昶) was also a well-known calligrapher.

Despite the great fame he enjoyed in ancient times, no veritable works of Zhang Zhi's have survived. A catchphrase is attributed to him: "Too busy to write cursively" (匆匆不暇草書), (Note: There is a similar Chinese proverb: "Too hasty to write in cursive script; too impoverished to prepare a vegetarian meal." (信速不及草書，家貧難辦素食) Compare the well-known quote by Pascal: "Je n'ai fait celle-ci plus longue que parce que je n'ai pas eu le loisir de la faire plus courte." (in Lettres provinciales)) which shows that the execution of cursive script, though originally invented for the sake of time-saving, requires a tranquil frame of mind.

== Bibliography ==
- Zhong, Mingshan, ""Zhang Zhi". Encyclopedia of China (Arts Edition), 1st ed.
