= Tang Zhen =

Tang Zhen (Chinese: 唐甄; pinyin: Tang Zhen; Wade–Giles: T'ang Chen, 1630–1704), born Tang Dadao (唐大陶), courtesy name Zhuwan (铸万), was a Chinese philosopher and educator born in Dazhou during the late Ming and early Qing dynasties. His given name was Dahao, but later he changed his given name to Zhen and his courtesy name to Puyuan (圃園).

In 1657, he successfully achieved the rank of juren (举人) or quasi-master's degree provincial level. He then became the mayor of a town in Shanxi province. Later in life, he became an author, philosophizing about politics and life.

He is known for his outspokenness. For example, he criticized the autocratic system by writing that "all emperors are thieves since the Qin dynasty" (自秦以來，凡為帝王者皆賊也) in his work.
