= Yang Rongguo =

Chinese philosopher (1907–1978)

Yang Rongguo (simplified Chinese: 杨荣国; traditional Chinese: 楊榮國; pinyin: Yáng Róngguó; Wade–Giles: Yang Jungkuo, 1907–1978) was a Chinese academic and philosopher who was involved in the Criticize Lin, Criticize Confucius campaign of the Cultural Revolution.

Yang initially began his study of Confucius with a publication in 1947 which was revised and published again in 1973. During the Cultural Revolution he was a professor at Zhongshan University. He published an article on July 7, 1973, in People's Daily entitled "Confucius-A Thinker Who Stubbornly Upheld the Slave System." This article, coupled with his republication of work, brought him into significance. He began publicly connecting Lin Biao, the fallen Chinese leader now condemned as a rightist, with Confucius, who had long been campaigned against. Yang connected not only Lin, but also generalized Liu Shaoqi and other ousted leaders as Confucian followers. Confucius was a more significant target than before, however, and was a stand-in for Premier Zhou Enlai, who was not criticized by name. Among Yang Rongguo's points was that Confucius had suppressed societal changes in his era, and that Zhou Enlai had been doing similar things by working towards the rehabilitation of ousted CCP leaders in 1972, including Deng Xiaoping.
