= Lewis Ziska =

American plant physiologist, academic and author

Lewis H. Ziska
- Citizenship: USA
- Occupations: Plant physiologist, academic and author

Academic background
- Education: BS in Biology; MS in Plant Science; PhD in Plant Physiology
- Alma mater: University of California, Riverside; University of California, Davis

Academic work
- Institutions: Columbia University

Lewis H. Ziska is an American plant physiologist, academic and author. He is an associate professor in the Environmental Health Sciences at the Mailman School of Public Health at Columbia University.

Ziska is most known for exploring the intersection of climate change, carbon dioxide levels, plant biology, and public health. He has contributed to multiple reports by the Intergovernmental Panel on Climate Change (IPCC) in 1995, 2001, 2007, 2014, and 2022. Additionally, he was a contributor to the 2014 and 2018 National Climate Assessment (NCA), specifically the Public Health and Air Quality chapters, and led the 2016 special NCA report on climate and health, titled The Impacts of Climate Change on Human Health in the United States: A Scientific Assessment. He is the author of four books, including Climate Change and Rice and Greenhouse Planet: How Rising CO_{2} Changes Plants and Life as We Know It.

== Education ==
Ziska earned his BS in Biology from the University of California, Riverside in 1979. He received his PhD in Plant Physiology from the University of California, Davis in 1988.

== Career ==
Ziska began his career as a Smithsonian fellow and later became the Project Leader for global climate change at the International Rice Research Institute in the Philippines in 1993. This was followed up by a 25-year career as a Plant Physiologist at the USDA's Agricultural Research Service, where he resigned in 2019 to protest interference by the Trump administration with his research into the effects of rising carbon dioxide on rice nutrition. Since 2019, he has been holding an appointment as an associate professor in Environmental Health Sciences at the Mailman School of Public Health at Columbia University.

== Research ==
Ziska's research examines the relationship between climate change, food insecurity, and the role of plant biology in public health. He has conducted research on the effects of climate change and increasing carbon dioxide levels on human health from a botanical perspective, covering areas such as allergies, nutrition, plant-based medicine, and pesticide exposure.

Ziska's research has been covered by the media, with articles published in The Wall Street Journal, National Geographic, The New York Times, USA Today, The Washington Post, The Boston Globe, Chicago Tribune and Newsweek. He was also named "The Best and the Brightest" by Esquire Magazine in 2010 and discussed his work on resilient, weed-like crops for future food production in its feature, focusing on their adaptability to climate change's harsh conditions, such as extreme heat and high CO_{2} levels. Additionally, he has made appearances on ABC World News alongside Charles Gibson, and NBC Nightly News with Brian Williams, and was featured in an HBO documentary titled "Too Hot Not to Handle", which explored the impacts of climate change in the United States.

=== Climate change and food security ===
Ziska has highlighted the impact of climate change on agriculture, emphasizing the challenges to crop production posed by temperature, CO_{2}, and precipitation changes, and underscoring the need for resilient cropping systems. He contributed to the USDA report titled Climate Change and Agriculture in the United States: Effects and Adaptation, focusing on adaptation strategies such as altered planting and resilient livestock breeding, while also highlighting the importance of relevant climate information in local decision-making. In addition, he was a co-leader for the special National Climate Assessment, requested by the Obama Administration. The assessment provided an evidence-based estimation of climate change-related health impacts in the United States.

Ziska's book Agriculture, Climate Change and Food Security in the 21st Century: Our Daily Bread, explored agriculture's history and climate change's threat to food security, offering solutions like polyculture farming and feminism. His subsequent book, Greenhouse Planet published in 2022 highlighted the consequences of increased CO_{2} on plants, people, and ecosystems, exploring its complex effects and addressing politicization and disinformation. Judith Deutsch, a columnist in a book review for the New York Journal of Books called it "an exceptionally important and readable book" and referred to his writing as "clear, personal, and expressive."

=== Climate change and allergies ===
Ziska's research has shed light on how climate change and rising carbon dioxide alter aeroallergens, contact dermatitis, and toxicology, indirectly impacting food security, plant compounds, production, nutritional quality, and pharmacology. His research has linked elevated carbon dioxide and climate change to plant-based allergens and public health. Alongside researchers, he presented a report on CO_{2}'s impact on artemisinin production, a plant-based drug used to treat malaria, suggesting potential global changes in its chemistry, which could increase drug availability per cultivation area.

=== Climate change and rice ===
Ziska conducted the initial research on the effects of increasing carbon dioxide and air temperature on the growth and yield of tropical field-grown rice, as well as the impact of high temperature and CO_{2} concentration on spikelet sterility in indica rice. He also contributed to a study linking the increase in carbon dioxide levels to the rise in methane efflux in rice systems. In one of his highly cited studies, he suggested that increased atmospheric carbon dioxide (CO_{2}) led to declines in protein, essential minerals, and vitamins (B1, B2, B5, B9) in rice.

=== Climate change and weed biology ===
With Jeffrey S. Dukes, Ziska authored Weed Biology and Climate Change, delving into the ecological importance of weeds. This book covered their impact on crops, response to carbon dioxide, herbicide use, allergy effects, and control methods, while highlighting their interconnectedness with plants, animals, and climate. Jonne Rodenburg called this work a "must read for all scholars interested in plant and ecology".

In 2022, Ziska was the editor of Invasive Species and Global Climate Change which examined the effects of present and expected human-induced climate change on global invasive species, including plants, animals, and pathogens. In collaborative works, he reviewed plant invasion dynamics amid global change, emphasizing the need for research to enhance invasion risk forecasts, and presented an agronomic perspective on invasive species and climate change.

== Bibliography ==
=== Books ===
- Climate Change and Rice (1996) ISBN 9783642851957
- Weed Biology and Climate Change (2011) ISBN 9780813814179
- Invasive species and global climate change (2014) ISBN 9781780641645
- Agriculture, Climate Change and Food Security in the 21st Century: Our Daily Bread (2017) ISBN 9781527503144
- Greenhouse Planet: How Rising CO_{2} Changes Plants and Life as We Know It (2022) ISBN 9780231206709

=== Selected articles ===
- Ziska, L. H., Gebhard, D. E., Frenz, D. A., Faulkner, S., Singer, B. D., & Straka, J. G. (2003). Cities as harbingers of climate change: common ragweed, urbanization, and public health. Journal of allergy and clinical immunology, 111(2), 290–295.
- Bradley, B. A., Blumenthal, D. M., Wilcove, D. S., & Ziska, L. H. (2010). Predicting plant invasions in an era of global change. Trends in ecology & evolution, 25(5), 310–318.
- Hatfield, J. L., Boote, K. J., Kimball, B. A., Ziska, L. H., Izaurralde, R. C., Ort, D., ... & Wolfe, D. (2011). Climate impacts on agriculture: implications for crop production. Agronomy journal, 103(2), 351–370.
- Walthall, C., & Jones, R. A. (2013). Climate change and agriculture in the United States: Effects and adaptation. USDA Technical Bulletin 1935.
- Crimmins, A., Hawkins, Herring, S. C., Jantarasami, L., Mills, D., Saha, S., Sarofim, M. C., Trtanj, J., Balbus, J., Ziska, L. H., Gamble, J. L., Beard, C. B., Bell, J. E., Dodgen, D., Eisen, R. J., & Fann, N. (2016). The Impacts of climate change on Human health in the United States: a scientific assessment. https://doi.org/10.7930/j0r49nqx
