= Shen Rong =

Chinese writer (1936–2024)

Shen Rong (Chinese: 谌容; pinyin: Shèn Róng; 1936 – 4 February 2024) was a Chinese writer. Her name also appears as Chen Rong.

== Biography ==
Shen was born Shen Derong (Chinese: 谌德容) in Hankou, Hubei. Because of the political unrest of the time, her family moved frequently, finally settling in Chongqing. She worked as an assistant at a publishing house and studied Russian in Beijing. She then worked as a translator at a radio station but was released in 1963 due to illness. In 1973, she went to live with a peasant family in Shanxi.

Shen began writing in the 1970s, producing the novel The Eternal Spring (Yongyuan shi chuntian). Her story At Middle Age (Ren dao zhongnian) (1980) won a literary award and was made into a movie, catapulting her into the spotlight. In 1991, she published At Old Age (Rendao Iaonian).

In 1983, she wrote the essay Novels strangled in the cradle: My Senseless Literary Battles, which described her difficulties as a writer living through radical shifts in her society's ideology.

Shen died on 4 February 2024, at the age of 88.
