= Leung Long Chau =

Chinese poet and calligrapher

Leung Long Chau (Chinese: 梁朗秋, 1911–December 1998) was a Chinese poet and calligrapher. Born in the early 1910s in Guangdong Province, he graduated at the Guangdong Medical Research Institute. In the late 1920s, he married Ho Wing Yuet and settled down in Hong Kong.

Under colonial rule, his Chinese qualification as a medical practitioner was not recognized; he thus had to turn to business to make a living. His work for a local company just made up the living expenses for his large family. In his spare time he continued to offer free medical advice to his compatriots, and to write poems and practice calligraphy—both hobbies of his since childhood.

Through the years he written many poems about Hong Kong, but at the time they remained unpublished. This changed in 1984, when his children decided to compile his works and published Lang Yin Xiao Cao (朗吟小草) for non-commercial purposes. It was never sold in bookstores, but managed to get the attention of the close circle of Chinese poets in Hong Kong and was widely acclaimed as valuable for anyone seriously interested in Chinese literature and Hong Kong culture.

In 1998, the Leung family decided to publish a sequel to Lang Yin Xiao Cao (朗吟小草續集), compiling his major works written after 1984. In the same year, the low-profile poet received his first and only prize for Chinese literature from the Hong Kong Government. He died in December 1998.
