= Wang Fanzhi =

Wang Fanzhi (Chinese: 王梵志; pinyin: Wáng Fànzhì; Wade–Giles: Wang Fan-chih, fl. 7th century) or Brahmacarin Wang was a Chinese Buddhist poet born in Hebi, Henan during the Tang dynasty. He is the putative author of two collections of early Tang vernacular poetry. The language can be dated to the 8th century. Very few of the poems were known until the Dunhuang manuscripts were discovered in the early 20th century.

The first collection of moralistic verse, "the 92 poems collection", exists in 5 complete manuscripts.

The second collection, "the three-juan collection", has not been found in a complete copy, but has been reconstructed from seven manuscripts. These manuscripts contain poems of a higher artistic value. The content can be compared with the poems in the Hanshan collection. Wang's language is marked by the use of more colloquial Medieval Vernacular Sinitic than almost any other Tang poet.
