= Xu Zaisi =

Chinese poet

Xu Zaisi (Chinese: 徐再思; Wade–Giles: Hsü Tsai-szu, fl. fourteenth century) was a Yuan dynasty Chinese poet in sanqu style. His courtesy name was Deke (德可). He is said to have relished sweets, thereby adopting the pen name Tianzhai (甜斋, “Sweets Study”). His son Xu Shanchang also achieved reputation. The elder Xu was at least a minor figure in officialdom, holding the rank of Circuit Sub official Functionary for Jiaxing in Zhejiang, his home city.

== POEMS ==
=== THINKING OF ANCIENT TIMES AT GANLU ===
Towers and halls
Of the old temple by the river.
Autumn colors slip into the water.
Green grass by the ruined wall,
Fallen leaves by the empty portico.
Green moss by the half-hidden stairs.
The stranger goes south
As the sun dips westward,
The river toward the east.
Magnolia blossoms stay
As the monks question,
“For whom?”

=== MOORED AT NIGHT ON AN AUTUMN RIVER ===
As the sun sets ten thousand points of evening crows;
West wind, flowering reeds on the banks of the river.
The boat is moored by a river tavern;
And that romantic court minister-
In his dream of green skirts,
A lute.

=== ON THE RIVER NEAR CHANG MOUNTAIN ===
Hills far away,
Hills close;
All a blur of blue-green.
Confusion of stones in the rapids as we sail against the current.
Narrow as if the joined clouds were walls.
Sun sinks, crows at dusk;
West wind and homeward geese.
I sigh because the way is hard.
Blocked here
Then blocked again,
And everywhere fish soup to eat!
