= Yang Borun =

Yang Borun (simplified Chinese: 杨伯润; traditional Chinese: 楊伯潤; pinyin: Yáng Bórùn; Wade–Giles: Yang Pojun, 1837–1911), born Yang Peifu (杨佩夫), was a well-known Chinese poet, calligrapher, and painter of the Shanghai School.

Yang was born to a scholarly family in Jiaxing, Zhejiang, he arrived in Shanghai in the early 1860s. Yang sold his paintings, mostly landscapes, to support the family. Some of them are in the collections of museums in Shanghai, Tokyo, Hong Kong, Taiwan, and Cleveland. A book of Yang's poetry is held at the Harvard University Yenching Library. Samples of his calligraphy have been published in Japan.

== See also ==
- Chinese art
- Chinese painting
