= Chen Dayu =

Chinese artist (1912–2001)

Chen Dayu (21 May 1912 – 1 June 2001) (simplified Chinese: 陈大羽; traditional Chinese: 陳大羽), was a Chinese painter, calligrapher, seal carver and educator.

== Early life and education ==
Chen was born in Chaoyang, Guangdong province, as Chen Hanqing. In spite of his impoverished childhood, he developed an abiding passion for artistic pursuits. After studying under Zhu Lesan, Zhu Wenyun and Wang Geyi, he graduated from Shanghai Art College in 1935.

== Career ==
In 1946, Chen went to Beijing to become an apprentice of artist Qi Baishi to learn the art of freehand flower-and-bird paintings. During the apprenticeship, he changed his name to Chen Ao as a tribute to his instructor. Two years later, he lectured at the Shanghai Academy of Art until he left in 1950 to become a Professor of Art at the Nanjing Institute of Art. He also began a long side career as a flower-and-bird painter, calligrapher and a seal carver, but he's best known for his numerous paintings of a rooster.

In 1980, his work was displayed at the Jiangsu Museum of Art and the following year at the Shanghai Museum of Art. Chen was adept at both Chinese style and western painting. In his later years he developed a distinctly personal artistic style. His series of rooster paintings are celebrated worldwide.

== Death ==
After retiring to Nanjing, Chen died on 1 June 2001.

== Exhibitions ==
Chen's work has been featured in various exhibitions at the Asian Art Museum of San Francisco over years. Three major collections of Chen’s paintings have been published: in 1948, in 1982, and in Japan in 1988. A major exhibition centenary exhibition, included 140 of his inkwash paintings, toured China in 2011-13.
