= Yang Shuo (writer) =

Chinese writer

Yang Shuo (Chinese: 杨朔; pinyin: Yáng Shuò, April 28, 1913 – August 3, 1968) was a Chinese lyricist and essayist born in Penglai, Shandong. He produced over a hundred works. He committed suicide during the Cultural Revolution by overdosing on sedatives.

His works continue to be taught in Chinese schools as part of the literary curriculum. Part of his work was dedicated to writing about everyday life in African and Asian countries.

== Selected Publications ==
- 1978 《杨朔散文选》Yang Shuo's Selected Essays (People's Publishing House)
- 1978 《三千里江山》Three Thousand Miles of Rivers and Mountains (People's Publishing House)
- 1979 《杨朔短篇小说集》Yang Shuo's Collection of Short Stories (People's Publishing House)
- 《帕米尔高原的流脉》 Stream of the Pamir Plateeau

Short stories

- 《月黑夜》Moon Dark Night
- 《大旗》Big Flag
- 《霜天》Frost Day
- 《麦子黄时》When the Wheat is Gold

Novels

- 《红石山》Hongshi Mountain (about the life of miners at Xuanhua Longyan Iron Mine)
- 《北线》North Front (about the North China Liberation War)
- 《北黑线》North Black Line (about soldiers and railway workers nrepairing damaged railway lines)
- 《锦绣山河》Beautiful Mountains and Rivers
- 《三千里江山》Three Thousand Miles of Rivers and Mountains

Essays

- 《西北路途散记》Northwest Journey Essays
- 《石油城》Oil City
- 《亚洲日出》Asian Sunrise (collection of essays about Asian and African countries and the struggle for independence)
- 《东风第一枝》The First Branch of Dongfeng
- 《生命泉》Spring of Life
- 《蓬莱仙境》Penglai Wonderland (about his hometown)
- 《海市》Haishi (about his hometown)
- 《荔枝蜜》Litchi Honey
- 《雪浪花》Snowy Wave Flowers
- 《茶花赋》An Ode to Camellias
- 《云南看云》Watching Clouds in Yunnan

== Translations ==
- 《亚洲日出》 (Asia Sunrise, 1957) - written after visiting Port Said in February 1957, a few months after the Suez Crisis. Translated by Joanna Suwen Lee-Brown, positions, 20 July 2025.
