= Žiar =

Žiar may refer to:

- Žiar, Liptovský Mikuláš District, a municipality in Slovakia
- Žiar, Revúca District, a municipality in Slovakia
- Žiar (mountain range), Slovakia
- Žiar nad Hronom, Slovakia
