= Jiang Fangzhou =

Chinese infant prodigy author (born 1989)

- 蒋方舟
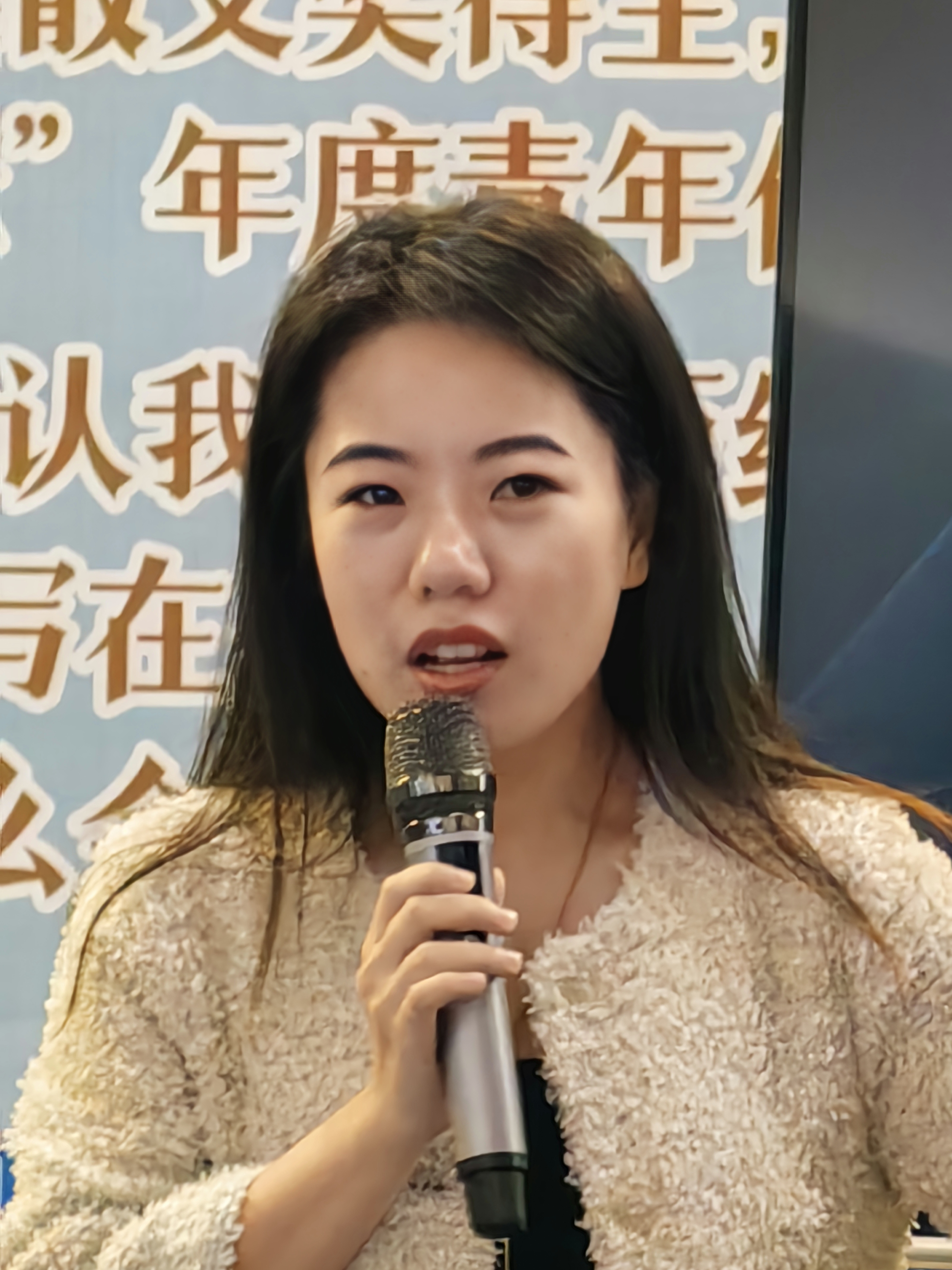
- Jiang in 2023
- Born: October 27, 1989 (age 36); Xiangfan, Hubei, China
- Education: Tsinghua University
- Occupation: Novelist
- Writing career
- Language: Chinese
- Period: 2005–present
- Genre: Novel
- Notable work: Number One Schoolgirl

Jiang Fangzhou (simplified Chinese: 蒋方舟; traditional Chinese: 蔣方舟; pinyin: Jiǎng Fāngzhōu; born October 27, 1989) is a Chinese writer. She began writing at the age of seven and published her first book at nine, rising to prominence as a “child prodigy”. Upon graduating from Tsinghua University, she became deputy editor-in-chief of New Weekly magazine until her resignation in 2019, after which she became an independent writer. In 2025 she was accused of plagiarism and academic fraud in her master's thesis. Renmin University of China later stripped her of her master's degree.

== Biography ==
Jiang was born on October 27, 1989, in Xiangfan (now Xiangyang), Hubei, to Shang Ailan, a middle school Chinese teacher and writer.

Jiang published her first book, Unlatched the Window onto the Paradise (Chinese: 打开天窗), when she was 9; the book was later adapted for a comic book. Her other works include We are Growing (Chinese: 正在发育), a novel in 2001; Preadolescence (Chinese: 青春前期) in May 2002; Look over Here (Chinese: 都往我这儿看) in October 2002; I am an Animal (Chinese: 我是动物), a long fairy tale in October, 2003, later adapted for a stage play; The True Story of the Mischievous Child (Chinese: 邪童正史), a collection of her column articles in The Beijing News and Southern Metropolis Daily, in October 2004; The Rainbow Rider (Chinese: 骑彩虹者) in July 2006; Number One Schoolgirl (Chinese: 第一女生) in July 2007; and Features of Rumors (Chinese: 谣言的特点) in January 2009.

In 2016, Jiang lived in Tokyo, as part of an exchange program organized by the Japan Foundation for International Exchange. She wrote about her experience in Tokyo One Year.
