= Jia Rongqing =

Canadian mathematician of Chinese origin

Jia Rongqing (simplified Chinese: 贾荣庆; traditional Chinese: 賈榮慶; pinyin: Jiǎ Róngqìng; Wade–Giles: Chia Jungch'ing) is a Canadian mathematician of Chinese origin who is a mathematics professor at the University of Alberta researching approximation theory and wavelet analysis.

== Life ==
He was an undergraduate student at the Zhejiang University in Hangzhou, China, where he obtained his Bachelor of Science in 1968. In 1980, he went to the University of Wisconsin–Madison and undertook M.Sc. and Ph.D. work under the supervision of Carl-Wilhelm de Boor, receiving his Ph.D. in 1983.

He is a professor of mathematics at the University of Alberta in Edmonton, Alberta.

== Selected publications ==
- R.Q. Jia, Smoothness of multivariate refinable functions in Sobolev spaces, Trans. Amer. Math. Soc.351 (1999) 4089-4112.
- R.Q. Jia, Shift-invariant spaces and linear operator equations, Israel Math. J. 103 (1998), 259-288.
- R.Q. Jia, Approximation properties of multivariate wavelets, Mathematics of Computation 67 (1998), 647-665
- R.Q. Jia, Perturbation of polynomial ideals, Advances in Applied Mathematics 17 (1996), 308-336.
- R.Q. Jia, The Toeplitz theorem and its applications to approximation theory and linear PDE's, Trans. Amer. Math. Soc. 347 (1995), 2585-2594.
