= Huang Ruheng =

Chinese calligrapher

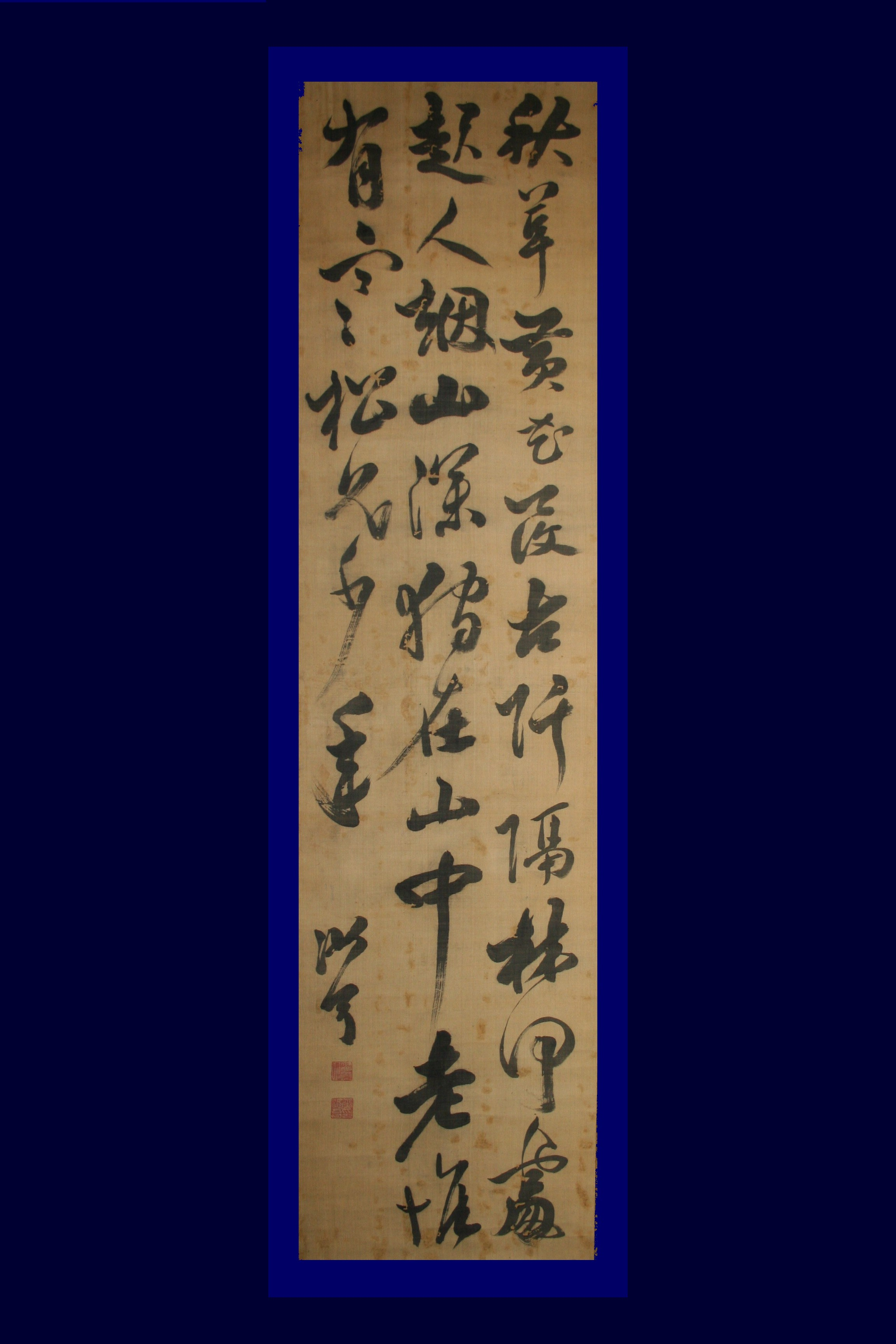
Nantoyōsō Collection, Japan

Huang Ruheng (Chinese: 黃汝亨, 1558–1626) was a Chinese calligrapher of the late Ming dynasty. His courtesy name was Zhenfu (贞父, “True Father”) and his pen name was Yuyong Jushi (寓庸居士, “Refined Scholar Dwelling in Simplicity”).

Huang was a native of the cultural mecca Hangzhou. In 1598, he passed his Jinshi examination and held an official post in Jiangxi. His calligraphy style combined the manner of two Song dynasty masters, Su Shi and Mi Fei. Huang's best known calligraphy was, in his lifetime, reproduced in the Ming period painting-calligraphy album Tangshi Huapu (唐诗画谱, "Paintings of Tang Period Poems"), which itself was copied onto additional paintings. As was common in the Ming period, Huang perhaps did multiple versions of this Tang period poem by Liu Zhangqing (劉長卿) and others. His calligraphy was certainly sought after during his lifetime and in the period right after his death. Huang was also something of a poet. Examples of his verse can be found in various collections. A photo of a surviving example in Japan of his Liu Zhangqing poem is reproduced here. The poem reads:

Seeking Out Zen Master Lanjo

Autumn grasses and yellow flowers cover the ancient path;

In the glade beyond, from where does someone’s smoke come?
Only the mountain monk has grown old in the hills;

Just the cold pines have seen anyone young.
