= Lu Zhi (poet) =

Chinese writer

Lu Zhi (simplified Chinese: 卢挚; traditional Chinese: 盧摯; Wade–Giles: Lu Chih, ca. 1243—1315) was a Chinese writer of the Yuan dynasty. His courtesy name was Chudao (处道) and his pen name was Shuzhai (疏斋). He was born in modern Zhuozhou, Hebei, although some accounts claim he was from modern Yongjia, Zhejiang.

Lu received his Jinshi degree in 1269 and served in various administrative positions until becoming a member of the Hanlin Academy. After Kublai Khan had taken the throne, Chinese literary men were encouraged to serve the new ruling house at the palace, Lu was one of them. He was known for his works in various genres, but his sanqu lyrics have received special note as representative works of the genre’s early period. Many of the poet’s sanqu lyrics are characterized by historical themes and a desire for a reclusive life despite his position as a prominent high official of the Yuan dynasty. His works display a high level of literary accomplishment, along with forthrightness and directness of emotional expression. Much of his poetry displays a directness and clarity one would expect from anonymous and popular works.

About 120 poems are preserved in the Collected Yuan Sanqu Lyrics. Lu's collected works were lost. However his extant poetry and prose was again collected and published in 1984. Lu had an affair with the actress Zhu Lianxiu. The poems they exchanged are still extant.

== Quotations ==
Dongting Lake, inscribed on the Deer Antler Temple Wall

Rains clear and clouds disperse,

A bright moon fills the river.
Winds subside and waves die down;
A single leaf of a ship.
Mind awake at midnight
With dreams of past, present and future.
Thousands of miles parted;
Sadly I lean against the ship’s window

And sleep a little.

Composed at the Lingying Inn

Plum blossoms hold the melting snow and bear it;

Willows lean with the eastern wind and wait their leaves.
Lithe girl, wine cups, room in a tower;
The red sleeved wanderer

Sings in a soft voice Coming of Spring.

Enjoying Myself

Soft tapping during the dance,

Red silk in the spring wind.
Soft clapping during the medley,
The moon and red castanets.
Golden oranges and flowing green wine,
Burners with incense and candles of red.
So much better than quiet talk in a cold room!
When sodden drunk I then went home,

Unable to recall who helped me on my horse.

Parting from Zhu Lianxiu

Just found joy,

Quickly parted.
The pain, the pain, so hard the leaving!
A colorful boat takes the spring and goes;

Vain it is keeping the bright moon in the river.
