= Chen Hongmou =

Chinese official and philosopher (1696–1771)

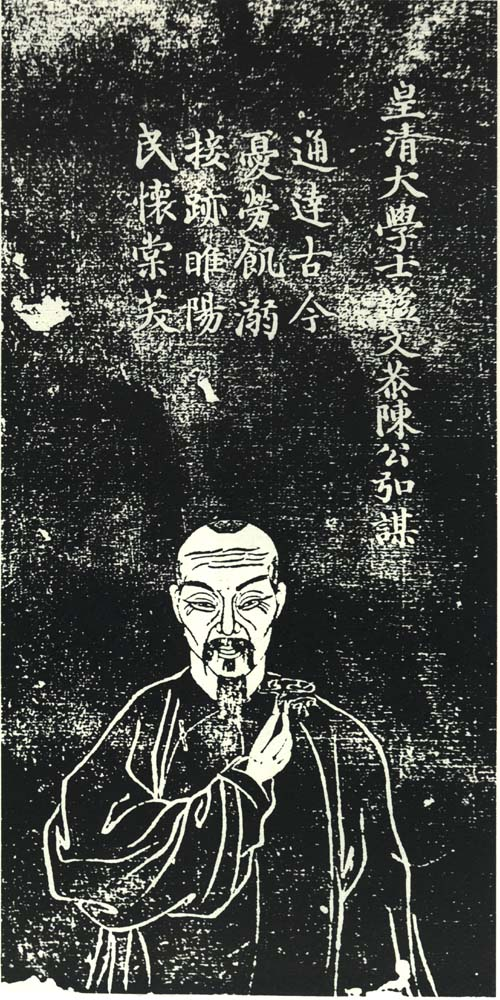

Grand Secretary of the Eastern Library
- In office 1767–1771

Assistant Grand Secretary
- In office 1764–1767

Minister of Personnel
- In office July 26, 1763 – April 15, 1767 Serving with Fusen (until 1765), Tondo (since 1765)
- Preceded by: Liang Shizheng
- Succeeded by: Liu Lun

Minister of War
- In office June 28 – July 26, 1763 Serving with Arigūn
- Preceded by: Liu Lun
- Succeeded by: Peng Qifeng

Viceroy of Liangguang
- In office January 14 – May 27, 1758
- Preceded by: Henian
- Succeeded by: Li Shiyao

Governor of Fujian
- In office 1752–1754
- Preceded by: Pan Siju
- Succeeded by: Zhongyin

Personal details
- Born: October 10, 1696; Lingui County, Guilin, Guangxi, China
- Died: July 14, 1771 (aged 74); Yanzhou, Shandong, China

Chen Hongmou (simplified Chinese: 陈宏谋; traditional Chinese: 陳宏謀; pinyin: Chén Hóngmóu; Wade–Giles: Ch'en Hungmou, October 10, 1696 – July 14, 1771), courtesy name Ruzi (汝咨) and Rongmen (榕門), was a Chinese official, scholar, and philosopher, who is widely regarded as a model official of the Qing dynasty.

== Early life ==
Chen was born in Lingui, Guangxi, to a family who migrated from Chenzhou in Hunan province in the late Ming dynasty. He was noted for the longest total service and most provincial posts than any other official during the Qing dynasty. In their work Anthology of Qing Statecraft Writings, He Changling and Wei Yuan praised him as an exemplary official, being surpassed only by Gu Yanwu.

== Career ==
Chen considered himself a disciple of Zhu Xi, but condemned various types of intellectual partisanship. His essays were very progressive for his time – in his vigorous advocation of education for people everywhere, he was one of the first philosophers to clearly state the idea that women and non-Chinese tribes could, and should, receive the same education as Han Chinese men.

Together with Gu Yanwu, He Changling, and Wei Yuan (mentioned above) he belongs to the "statecraft school" of the Chinese thought: its proponents advocated accommodation of the local administration to the changing social realities.
