= Zeyar =

Zeyar or Ziar or Ziyar (Persian: زيار) may refer to:

- Ziar, Golestan
- Ziar, Isfahan
- Zeyar, Mazandaran
- Ziyar, after whom the Ziyarid dynasty was named by one of his sons
