= Ho Fuk Yan =

Chinese writer

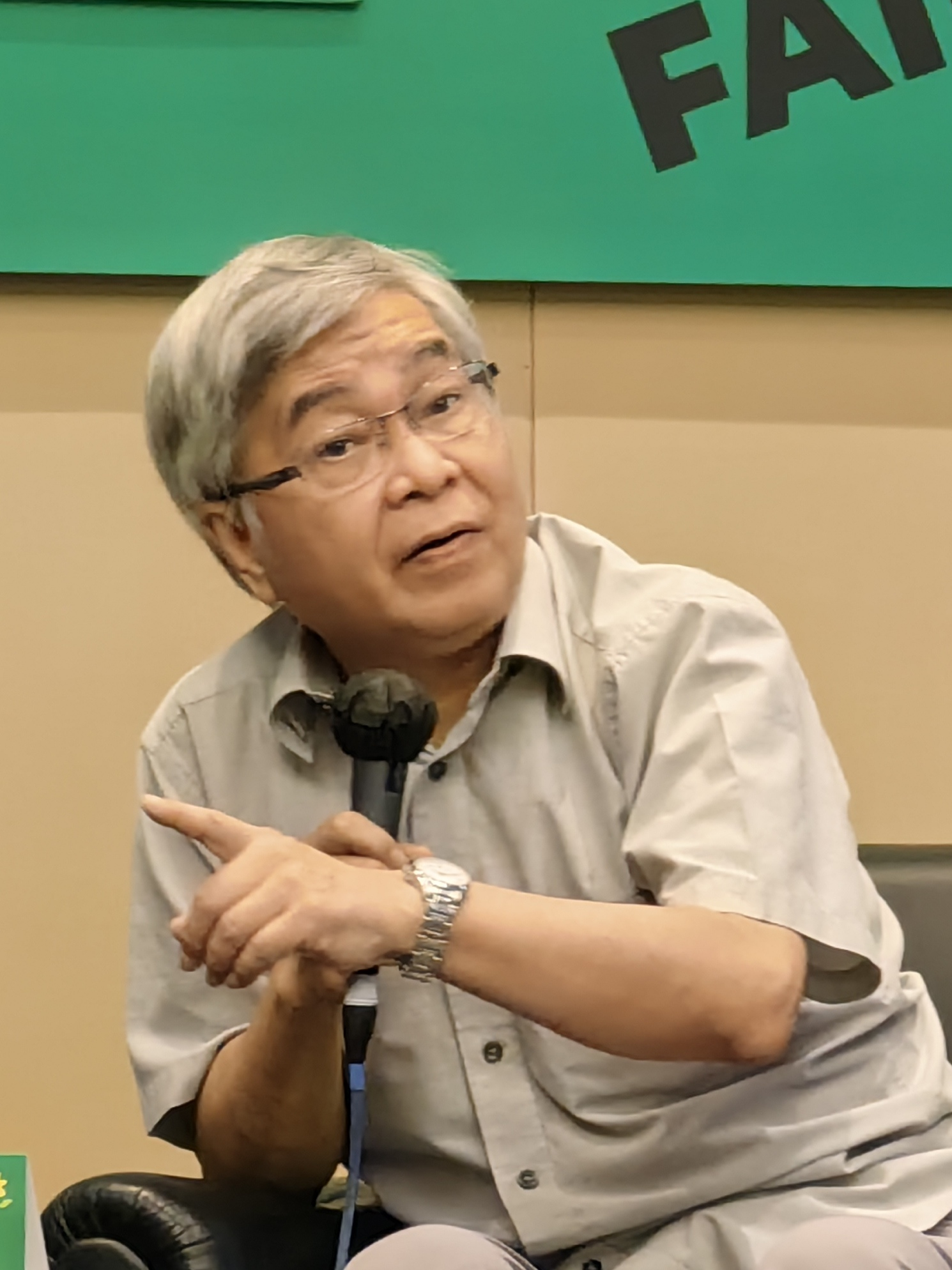
Ho Fuk Yan at 2023 Hong Kong Book Fair

Ho Fuk Yan (Chinese: 何福仁) is a Chinese-language author and poet in Hong Kong. Being the former Head of the Chinese Language Department of St. Paul's College, he also teaches Chinese History, Chinese Culture and Chinese Language before his retirement in 2010, after receiving his secondary education there and university education in The University of Hong Kong.

== Selected works ==
- A Reborn Tree ("再生樹")
- "An Interview with the Dragon" ("龍的訪問")

== Sources ==
- The first 90 years, University of Hong Kong
