= Mujawar Ahmad Zyar =

Afghan linguist and historian (born 1937)

Mojawer Ahmad Zyar
- مجاور احمد زيار
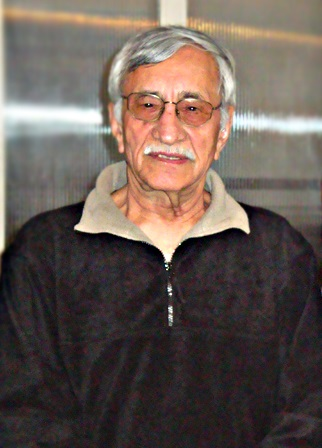
- Born: 1937 (age 88–89); Nangarhar, Afghanistan
- Education: Kabul University
- Occupations: Professor, writer, linguist, historian, expert on Afghan and Iranian literature
- Children: 2
- Website: www.zyar.net

Mojawer Ahmad Zyar (Pashto: مجاور احمد زيار) is an Afghan linguist, writer and historian of Afghanistan.

== Early life and education ==
Zyar was born in 1937 Mazeena Rod of Nangarhar Province, Afghanistan. He completed his primary education in a local school and graduated from high school in Kabul. After graduating from high school, Mojawer Ahmad was admitted to the Faculty of Language and Literature of Kabul University in 1959. He graduated 3 years later and started working in the same faculty. In 1966, he went to Bern, Switzerland where he completed his master's degree and PhD from University of Bern.

== Work life ==
From 1984 to 1986, Zyar taught as a guest professor at Humboldt University, Berlin, Germany. From 1994 to 1996, he taught as a visiting professor at the University of Peshawar, Peshawar in Pashto Department. He moved to Oxford in 1996 and has lived with his family in the city ever since. In the last 20 years he has become a widely respected figure in his field and has undertaken academic research for the University of Oxford, University of Cambridge whilst also advising several publications on Central Asian and Persian history.

== Academic work ==
Zyar is the author of over 50 books (including dictionaries and poems).
