= Zhang Kangkang =

Chinese female writer (born 1950)

Zhang Kangkang (simplified Chinese: 张抗抗; traditional Chinese: 張抗抗; pinyin: Zhāng Kàngkàng; born as Zhang Kangmei (simplified Chinese: 张抗美; traditional Chinese: 張抗美), July 3, 1950, Hangzhou) is a Chinese writer.

== Life ==
Zhang was born into a family of Communist intellectuals. Her first name, Kang-Kang, means 'resistance-resistance.' She belongs to a generation affected by the Cultural Revolution.

Zhang was among the young people sent to the remote countryside to be re-educated by the poor and lower-middle-class peasants. At the age of 19, Zhang volunteered to go to Heilongjiang Province, where she faced a life marked by deprivation and abuse by the party cadres assigned to re-educate the new arrivals before going on to study in Harbin in 1977.

Zhang's 1975 novel Dividing Line was one of the significant novels about the experiences of sent-down youth, a major literary genre during the Cultural Revolution.

She joined the China Writers Association in 1979 and was the deputy chairwoman of the Chinese Writers Association in Heilongjiang.

She returned to the city eight years later after the death of Mao Zedong and was allowed to resume her studies. In 1979, Kang-Kang published her first work, 'The Right to Love.' The book reflects on freedom and resistance against an oppressor.

She is married to a fellow writer, Jiang Rong, known for his 2004 novel, Wolf Totem.

== Works ==
- Dividing Line (1975)
- The Right to Love (1979)
- Summer (1981)
- The Pale Mists of Dawn (1980)
- Aurora Borealis (1981)
- The Wasted Years (Translated in Seven Contemporary Chinese Women Writers)
- Selected Works about Educated Youth. (Includes stories 'The Peony Garden', 'Cruelty' and 'Sandstorm')
- The Tolling of a Distant Bell (Translated by Daniel Bryant in Bulletin of Concerned Asian Scholars 16.3 (1984): 44-51, and Contemporary Chinese Literature (see below): 98-105)
- Northern Lights (Chapter 7 translated by Daniel Bryant in Chinese Literature, Winter 1988, pp. 92–102.)
- The Invisible Companion (Translated by Daniel Bryant. Beijing: New World Press, 1996.)
- The Peony Garden (Translated by Daniel Bryant, Renditions 58 (2002): 127-39.)
