= Lu Tong =

Chinese writer

- 盧仝
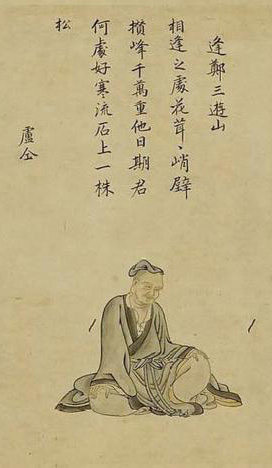
- Lu Tong, painted by Kanō Tsunenobu in the 18th century
- Born: 790; Jiyuan, Henan, China
- Died: 835; Chang'an, Shaanxi, China
- Other name: YuChuanZi 玉川子
- Occupation: Poet
- Notable work: Yuchuanzi’s Collection of Poetry

Chinese name
- Traditional Chinese: 盧仝
- Simplified Chinese: 卢仝
Transcriptions
Standard Mandarin
- Hanyu Pinyin: Lú Tóng
- Wade–Giles: Lu^{2} T'ung^{2}

Yuchuanzi
- Chinese: 玉川子
Transcriptions
Standard Mandarin
- Hanyu Pinyin: Yùchuānzi

Lu Tong's Seven Bowls of Tea, traditional Chinese characters

Lu Tong (pinyin: Lú Tóng; Wade–Giles: Lu T'ung; simplified Chinese: 卢仝; traditional Chinese: 盧仝; 790–835), pseudonym YuChuanZi (Chinese: 玉川子), was a Chinese poet of the Tang dynasty, known for his lifelong study of Chinese tea culture. He never became an official, and is better known for his love of tea than his poetry.

== Biography ==
Lu Tong, also called by his self-ascribed art name YuChuanZi, was from the city of Jiyuan in the Chinese province of Henan.

== Poetry ==
Lu Tong's Seven Bowls of Tea 七碗诗 卢仝 (唐. 790~835)

The first bowl moistens my lips and throat 一碗喉吻潤

The second bowl breaks my loneliness 二碗破孤悶

The third bowl searches my barren entrails but to find 三碗搜枯腸

therein some five thousand scrolls 惟有文字五千卷

The fourth bowl raises a slight perspiration 四碗發輕汗

and all life's inequities pass out through my pores 平生不平事盡向毛孔散

The fifth bowl purifies my flesh and bones 五碗肌骨清

The sixth bowl calls me to the immortals 六碗通仙靈

The seventh bowl could not be drunk 七碗吃不得也

only the breath of the cool wind raises in my sleeves 唯覺兩腋習習清風生

Where is Penglai Island, YuChuanZi (Lu Tong's self-ascribed pseudonym) wishes to ride on this sweet breeze and go back 蓬萊山﹐在何處，玉川子乘此清風欲歸去

(Steven R. Jones 2008)

Penglai Island, or Mount Penglai, is a mythologic island / mountain at the eastern end of Bohai Sea just east of Beijing, where the immortals live.

== See also ==
- The Classic of Tea
- Tea
- History of tea in China
- Tea Classics

== Works cited ==
- “Chinese-English Tea Studies Terminology”, (2010), Lu-Yu Tea Culture Institute, Co., Ltd, ISBN 978-957-9690-06-5
- Lu Tong poem
- The Seven Cups of Tea, in English and Chinese
- Ueki, Hisayuki; Uno, Naoto; Matsubara, Akira (1999). "Shijin to Shi no Shōgai (Ro Dō)". In Matsuura, Tomohisa (ed.). Kanshi no Jiten 漢詩の事典 (in Japanese). Tokyo: Taishūkan Shoten. p. 120. OCLC 41025662.
