= Zhan Ruoshui =

Chinese philosopher, educator and Confucian scholar (1466-1560)

- 湛若水
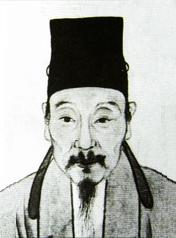

Personal details
- Born: 20 November 1466 Zengcheng, Guangdong, Ming Dynasty
- Died: 16 May 1560 (aged 93) Panyu, Guangdong, Ming Dynasty

Chinese name
- Chinese: 湛若水
Transcriptions
Standard Mandarin
- Hanyu Pinyin: Zhàn Ruòshuǐ
- Wade–Giles: Chan^{4} Jo^{4}-shui^{3}
Yue: Cantonese
- Jyutping: Zaam^{3} Joek^{6}-seoi^{2}

Zhan Ruoshui (Chinese: 湛若水; pinyin: Zhàn Ruòshuǐ; Wade–Giles: Chan Joshui, 1466–1560) was a Chinese philosopher, educator and a Confucian scholar.

== Biography ==
Zhan was born in Zengcheng, Guangdong. He was appointed the president of Nanjing Guozijian (南京國子監, the Imperial Nanjing University) in 1524. He was later appointed the Ming dynasty Minister of Rites (禮部, which mainly administers national ceremony, sacrifice, imperial examination, education, diplomacy, etc.), Minister of Personnel (吏部), and then Minister of War (兵部) at Nanjing.

As a scholar, Zhan is famous for mind theory (a branch of philosophy that deals with the nature of the mind and its relation to the body and the external world). He was also a famous educator. During his life, he founded or jointly founded more than 40 Shuyuan (書院, Confucian academies).

Zhan was a lifelong friend of the philosopher, general, and administrator Wang Yangming. They shared an appreciation of Lu Xiangshan idealism (xinxue), Daoism, and Buddhism, although their intellectual paths ultimately diverged.
