= Zhu Xiao Di =

Chinese-American writer (born 1958)

Zhu Xiao Di (Chinese: 朱小棣; pinyin: Zhū Xiǎodì; Wade–Giles: Chu Hsiao ti, born 1958) is a Chinese-American writer. He authored a biographical work, Thirty Years in a Red House: A Memoir of Childhood and Youth in Communist China, which was listed for further reading in MSN encyclopedia under the topic of "Communism" along with a few other books. He also authored a novel Tales of Judge Dee, and 6 collections of essays in Chinese including Leisure Thoughts on Idle Books (闲书闲话), 地老天荒读书闲, 闲读近乎勇, 等闲识得书几卷, 域外闲读, and 闲读闲记.

== Background ==
Born in 1958 in Nanjing, China, Zhu Xiao Di is a graduate of MIT with a master's degree in City Planning (1991). He also received a master's degree in American Civilization from the University of Massachusetts Boston in 1989.

Between 1992 and 1997, he worked at the Center for Survey Research at the University of Massachusetts Boston. He also worked for Arthur Andersen & Co. as a management consultant between 1995 and 1996. He worked at the Joint Center for Housing Studies at Harvard University between 1997 and 2012.

== Publications ==
- Thirty Years in a Red House (University of Massachusetts Press, 1998)
- Tales of Judge Dee (stories about Judge Dee)
- Leisure Thoughts on Idle Books 《闲书闲话》(Guangxi Normal University Press, 2009)
- 《地老天荒读书闲》
- 《闲读近乎勇》
- 《朱小蔓朱小棣跨洋对话——出国留学与教育“立人”》
- 《等闲识得书几卷》
- 《朱启銮画传》
- 《游学看美国》
- 《域外闲读》
- 《闲读闲记》
