= Zhong Xiaoyang =

Hong Kong writer

Zhong Xiaoyang or Sharon Chung 鍾曉陽 is a modern Hong Kong writer currently residing in Australia.

Chung was born in Guangzhou, China in 1962. Her father was an Indonesian doctor of Chinese descent, while her mother was from Shenyang, China. The family moved to Hong Kong when Chung was five months old. There, she attended Maryknoll Girls' School in Hong Kong and then came to America to study film at University of Michigan. After graduating, she returned to Hong Kong in 1986. In 1993, she moved to Sydney, Australia. Her writing combines elements of classical Chinese writing and Western influences; she also has been strongly influenced by the writing of Eileen Chang.

She published her first work of fiction Halt, May I Ask (停車暫借問) in 1981, at the age of 18, which received the Unitas Literature Award. In 1998, she published four volumes of poetry called Dead Tree and Extinguished Ashes (槁木死灰集):

- Change Color (變色)
- Love Lost (失戀)
- The Study (書齋)
- Seed (種子)

These poems, written stream of consciousness style, come across as dark but still sensitive to human emotion. She also published five collections of short stories and a novel A Romance of Unending Sorrow (遺恨傳奇) (1996). Her novel A Pinwheel Without Wind (煙雨紅顏) was made into a movie in 2002.
