= Zhao Luanluan =

Chinese poet

Zhao Luanluan (Chinese: 趙鸞鸞; Wade–Giles: Chao Luan-luan), courtesy name Wenyuan (文鹓), was a Chinese poet who lived during the Zhizheng reign (1341–1367), a chaotic period at the end of the Yuan dynasty. She is incorrectly included in the Quan Tangshi, a Qing dynasty anthology of Tang dynasty poems, whose compilers assumed that she was a prostitute because she composed some erotic poems.

== Biography ==
The Ming dynasty author Li Zhen or Li Changqi (李昌祺; 1376–1452), a near contemporary of Zhao Luanluan, wrote the Biography of Luanluan (Chinese: 鸞鸞傳). This account, although dramatized and not entirely credible, is the only extant record about Zhao's life.

According to Li Zhen, Zhao Luanluan was born to an elite family in Dongping, in modern Shandong province. She was first married to an impotent man with the surname Gu, who died a few months after their marriage. She then married Liu Ying (柳颖), but was kidnapped by the rebel leader Tian Feng's army. During her captivity she composed and sent to her husband a four-verse poem, which emulated a poem written by the famous 2nd-century poet Cai Yan when she was held captive by the Xiongnu. Liu took great risks to find his wife and managed to gain her release, and the couple took refuge in the Culai Mountain (徂徕山) in Shandong. Liu Ying, however, was later captured and killed by the rebels, and Zhao threw herself on her husband's funeral pyre.

The story of Zhao Luanluan and her husband inspired a late-Yuan or early-Ming nanxi drama called Liu Ying, which has been lost.

== Poetry ==
The Qing dynasty compilers of the Quan Tangshi (Complete Collection of Tang Poetry) mistook Zhao Luanluan as a Tang dynasty poet and included her poems in the anthology. Moreover, they thought she was a prostitute working in Pingkang, the red light district of the Tang capital Chang'an, because some of her poems are erotic in nature. This characterization is repeated in some modern sources.

Five of Zhao Luanluan's poems are extant, which are collectively called "Five Lyric Outcries from the Boudoir". One of Zhao's erotic poems is Su Ru (酥乳), translated as "Succulent Breasts" or "Creamy Breasts":

酥乳 Succulent Breasts

粉香汗湿瑶琴轸 A whiff of powder, damp with sweat, rare jade turning-pegs:
春逗酥融绵雨膏 Aroused by spring, they glisten, gleam, sleek as silkfloss-rains.
浴罢檀郎扪弄处 When, fresh from the bath, her sweet-scent lover teases with a touch,
灵华凉沁紫葡萄 Those magical buds feel shivery-wet—those dusky-purple grapes!
