= Qiao Ji =

Chinese poet

Qiao Ji (Chinese: 喬吉; 1280–1345) also known as Qiao Jifu (喬吉甫), courtesy name Mengfu (夢符), art names Shenghe Weng (笙鶴翁) and Xingxing Daoren (惺惺道人), was a Chinese dramatist and poet of the Yuan dynasty. He was originally from Taiyuan, but lived in the West Lake area in Zhejiang province. The Record of Ghosts (錄鬼簿) describes Qiao as having an aloof and intimidating demeanor, to the point people were in awe of him. Eleven of his plays survive.

Two of his plays, Jinqian Ji (金錢記) and Yangzhou Meng (揚州夢), were particularly celebrated in his day and are now considered part of the classical canon.

== Poetry ==
Much of his sanqu lyric poetry has survived, including 209 xiaoling lyrics and 11 taoshu suites. All were collected in the Complete Sanqu Poems. His collected works, Qiao Ji Ji, appeared in 1986. Qiao's lyrics combine literary language with the language of the street. One of his methods was referred to as the "six character prescription", which he explained as a lyric poem with a "phoenix head, pig's belly and a leopard tail". Qiao wrote that he had "wandered for forty years", travelling around many of the central and southern areas of China. In Looking for Plums, he described an episode of his wanders in the countryside, visiting villages during winter until he came across a village in a wooded mountain where a beautiful woman lived.

Social criticism is also a recurring theme in Qiao Ji's literary works. This often manifested in his poetry, where he constructed imaginary worlds so that they could be rejected. For instance, in the poem On Myself, the poetic persona enjoying his retirement from service described being included in a bureaucracy only to reject its manifestations such as the civil service examination system. Experts compare Qiao Ji's style with the work of Zhang Kejiu, in terms of its elegance and lucidity as well as the style and the use of pleasing sounds. The poem Sky-Clear Sand involved the combination of topic and comment construction, while his contemporaries wrote their poetry in a structure that began with a topic and followed with the comment.
