= Zhao Jingshen =

Chinese novelist

Zhao Jingshen (simplified Chinese: 赵景深; traditional Chinese: 趙景深; pinyin: Zhào Jǐngshēn) (1902–1985) was a popular Chinese novelist. He taught at Fudan University in Shanghai. Between July 1946 and January 1949, he edited three weekly newspaper columns on vernacular literature: one in the Shenzhen ribao (Shenzhen Daily News); a second in Dawan bao (Top Evening News); and a third in Zhongyang ribao (Central Daily News).

Born in Lishui, Zhejiang, he was a member of the Seminar in literature. He also contributed to the field of translation and folk opera, and funded other writers.
