= Zhang Yaotiao =

Chinese Tang Dynasty female singer and poet

Zhang Yaotiao (Chinese: 張窈窕) was a 9th-century Chinese poet of the Tang dynasty.

Her place and date of birth are not known. Zhang is referred to as Maiden Zhang Yaotiao in some sources. She was forced to flee to Chengdu in what is now Sichuan province, where she became a courtesan. At one point in her life, destitute, she was forced to pawn her clothes to support herself. Several of her poems are included in the Quan Tangshi. Tang Xianzu quotes lines from her poetry in his play Mǔdān tíng (The Peony Pavilion).
