= Zhou Lianggong =

Chinese poet, calligrapher, essayist and art historian

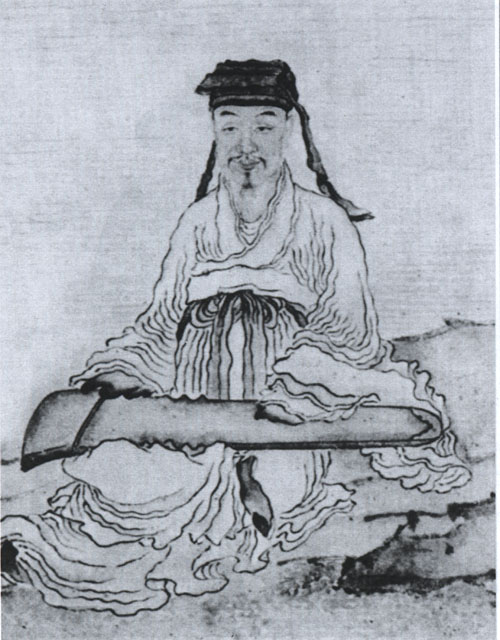
Zhou Lianggong's portrait

Zhou Lianggong (Chinese: 周亮工; pinyin: Zhōu Liànggōng; Wade–Giles: Chou Liang-kung, 1612–1672) was a Chinese poet, calligrapher, essayist, and art historian who was born in Kaifeng and had long family ties to Nanjing.

He passed his Jinshi degree in 1640, becoming a magistrate in Weixian, Shandong where he defended the city from attack from Manchu Qing army led by Abatai. He escaped to Beijing, but fled to Nanjing after the city was attacked by Li Zicheng's rebel forces. After Prince Dodo took Nanjing for the Qing dynasty, Zhou began serving the Qing. He would however take his place in the new Manchu regime in a variety of official capacities. In 1655, he was accused of official corruption by the Governor General of Fujian and Zhejiang Tongtai and finally faced imprisonment in Fuzhou, where he edited his poetry collection Laigutang Ji (賴古堂集). He was in jail when Koxinga's forces attacked, and he was temporarily released to lead the defense. Zhou was eventually granted amnesty in 1661, Zhou again served as an official, acting as grain intendant of Nanjing. In December 1669 he hosts a party, and over twenty Nanjing-affiliated painters and poets gathered there. He was accused again of corruption in 1669. His sentence was hanging, but he was again given amnesty and released during the general amnesty of 1670.

Late in life, he destroyed many of his writings, but not those of his many associates, whose work he guided and edited. Among his surviving works is a collection of jottings known as Yinshuwu Shuying (因树屋书影), a work he compiled in prison, and a remarkable collection of letters, Chidu Xinchao (尺牍新抄). The collection of letters was a democratic undertaking. Many of the collected letters are by those who aided in the compilation. In a real sense, Zhou was chief editor. In the immediate years after his death, Zhou was considered a writer of the first rank. By the 18th century, he and other writers who had served two dynasties were then considered of a lower level. In the late 18th century, his works were considered anathema by the ruling monarch.
