= Zhu Qianzhi =

Chinese intellectual, translator, and historian

- 朱謙之
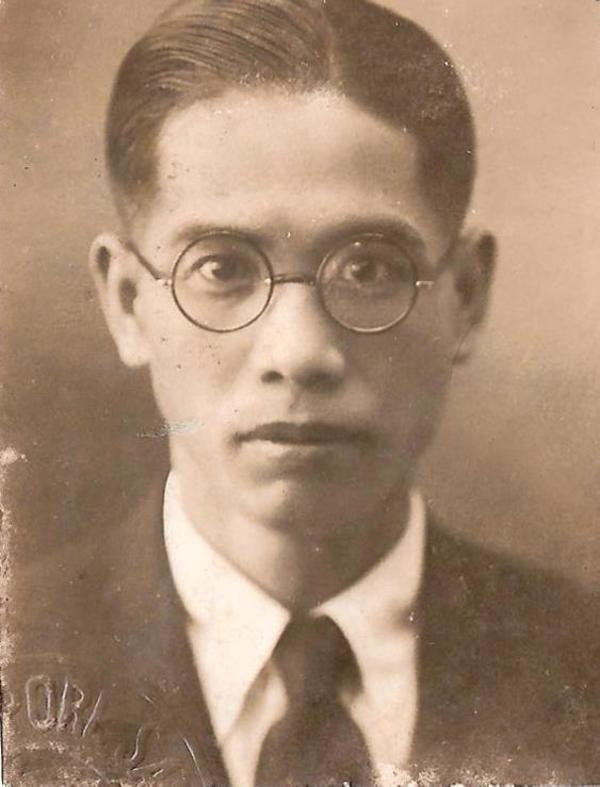
- Born: 17 November 1899; Fuzhou, China
- Died: 1972 (aged 82–83); Guangzhou, China
- Education: University of Beijing
- Known for: Crowd psychology
- Notable work: Philosophy of Revolution
- Movement: Anarchism in China

Zhu Qianzhi (simplified Chinese: 朱谦之; traditional Chinese: 朱謙之; pinyin: Zhū Qiānzhī; Wade–Giles: Chu Ch'ien-chih, 1899–1972) was a Chinese anarchist philosopher. An opponent of rationalism, Zhu wrote about the importance of emotionality and spontaneity during revolutionary action by the masses.

== Biography ==
Zhu Qianzhi was born in Fuzhou in 1899, the son of a physician. After coming of age, he enrolled at the University of Beijing and went on to study philosophy. He worked for an anarchist student newspaper and posted one of the first big-character posters, calling for students to boycott exams and for the university to stop issuing degrees. During the May Fourth Movement, Zhu turned himself into the police after a friend of his was caught carrying one of his anarchist pamphlets. During his three months in prison, he developed his revolutionary ideas into the book Philosophy of Revolution (1921). The book critiqued the philosophical schools of rationalism and utilitarianism, which were gaining popularity in the Republic of China at the time, and focused on crowd psychology. Despite attempts to suppress the book, it received numerous print runs. Wu Zhihui came to regard Zhu as one of the leading representatives of the new generation of Chinese philosophy.

After publishing his book, Zhu moved to Hangzhou and lived a secluded life for a number of years. He went to study in Japan in the late 1920s, then moved to Guangzhou in 1932 and took a position at Sun Yat-sen University. By the late 1930s, Zhu had become a supporter of Chiang Kai-shek's Nationalist government and quoted Chiang's invocation of action rather than searching for knowledge. He saw Chiang's campaign of mass mobilization in terms of unity between the crowd and a mobilizer.

Following the establishment of the People's Republic of China, the new government forced Zhu to write numerous self-criticisms of his anti-rationalist and anti-Marxist philosophy. During the Cultural Revolution, Zhu attempted to distance himself from his anarchist past and retroactively claim himself as a forerunner of communist revolutionary theories on the role of the masses. His ideas on emotionality and spontaneity as driving forces in revolution were later echoed by Mao Zedong and the Chinese Communist Party during subsequent mass mobilizations. Zhu himself died in 1972.

== Bibliography ==
- Huang, You-Dong (2007). "Zhu QianZhi and "Southern Culture Sport"". Modern Philosophy. 3: 69–74. ISSN 1000-7660.
- Qianwei, He (2022). "Form and Music in Modern Chinese Poetry". In Durkin, Rachael (ed.). The Routledge Companion to Music and Modern Literature. Routledge. pp. 263–271. doi:10.4324/9780367237288-25. ISBN 9780367237288.
- Xiao, Tie (2012). "The Lure of the Irrational: Zhu Qianzhi's Vision of 'Qunzhong' in the 'Era of Crowds.'". Modern Chinese Literature and Culture. 24 (2): 1–51. JSTOR 42940558.
