= Yuan poetry =

Historical poetry style in China

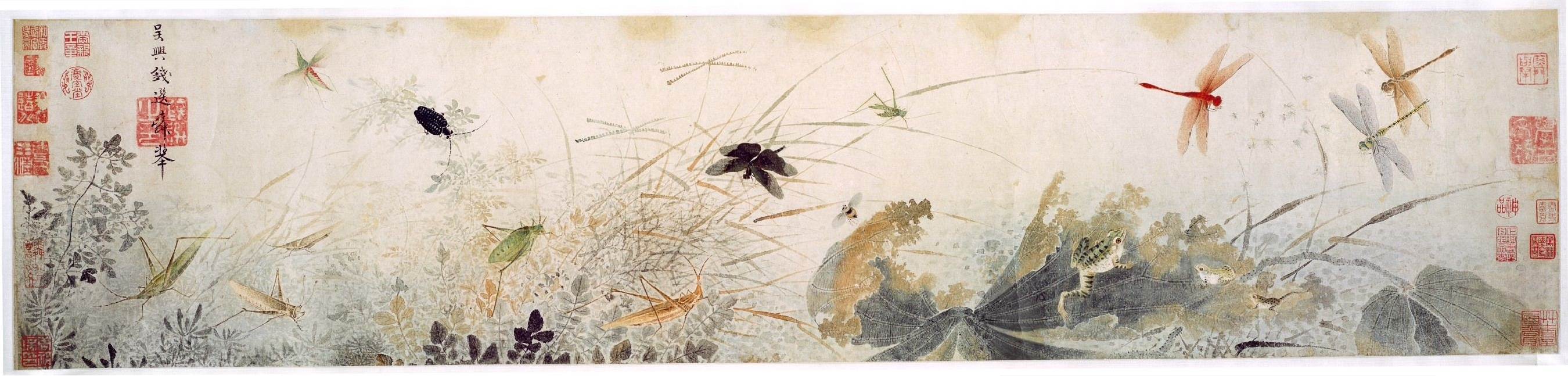
Qian Xuan – Early Autumn

Yuan poetry refers to those types or styles of poetry particularly associated with the era of the Yuan dynasty (1271–1368), in China. Although the poetic forms of past literature were continued, the Yuan period is particularly known for the development of the poetic aspects included in the complex mix of different art forms which characterize Chinese opera, namely the qu or fixed-tone pattern type of verses that were delivered by the actors of these shows. Although the language of Yuan poetry is still generally considered to be Classical Chinese, a certain vernacular aspect reflecting linguistic changes can be seen in some of the fixed-rhythm verse forms, such as Yuan ci and qu. Certain aspects of Yuan poetry can be understood in the context of the social and political changes which took place as part of the process of the Mongol conquest of the Jin and Song Dynasties and their subsequent establishment of the Yuan dynasty.

== History ==
The history of Yuan poetry involves both the received legacy of Classical Chinese poetry together with innovations, in part related to linguist and other changes in regard to aspects of the cultural background.

=== Background ===
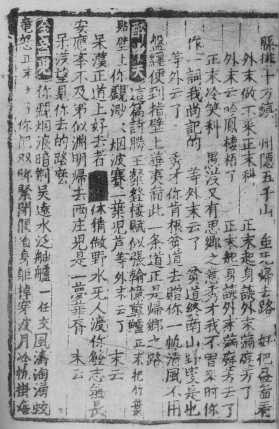
Woodblock edition of a zaju play entitled Zhuye Zhou.

Founded in 960, the Song dynasty reunified most of the traditional Chinese heartland from the North Central Plain to the area of the Yangzi River. This ushered in an era known for its poetry, particularly the fixed-rhythm verse form of the ci, and painting, particularly landscape painting, as well as other developments artistic and otherwise. However, primarily due to military reasons, in 1127, the dynasty was forced to relocate south of the Yangzi River, with the Jurchen Jin dynasty (1115–1234) assuming control in the North. Nevertheless, this "Southern" period of the Song dynasty was one associated with economic robustness and population growth, together with continued Chinese artistic achievements. However, in a series of military events associated with the growth of the Mongol Empire, the Yuan dynasty was established by its fifth Great Khan, Kublai, which included the former territories of both the Jin dynasty and the Southern Song. Despite the sometimes disastrous nature of this process, there was a certain continuity of Chinese culture, including poetry; although, due to the loss of records and so on, the historical details are not always clear. However, some of the known relevant changes include the changes in the economic system, such as through the tax structure, partly through the establishment of the Appanage system within China; the facilitation of trade and the communication along the Silk Road; and the establishment of a new imperial court in Dadu.

=== Received tradition ===
An important poetic legacy received by Yuan dynasty poets was the works of the poets of the Song dynasty, which together with the Jin dynasty in the north, preceded the Yuan dynasty. An example of this cultural legacy can be seen in the case of Yuan Haowen (1190–1257), a northern writer and poet who served under the Jin administration, but went into retirement at the advent of its fall to the Mongols. One example of poetic continuity from the Song to the Yuan period is the case of Zhao Mengfu (1254–1322), who although a member of the royal family of the Song dynasty, produced poetry and became rector of the Hanlin Academy under the Yuan. Although older forms of verse continued to be practiced, such as the shi form, most of innovative developments involved the fixed-rhythm Chinese poetry forms. However, the political and social disruptions associated with the founding of the Yuan dynasty have resulted in a relative lack in terms of surviving material to provide detailed information in this regard. Some information, however is available through knowledge of contemporary theater and the surviving associated documents.

== Characteristics ==
There are various characteristic elements to Yuan poetry, as known today, which are important to understanding this poetic phenomenon. These include: Jurchen influence; the influence of Buddhism, Daoism, and Confucianism; over-all artistic processes, such as painting and calligraphy; fixed-tone verse forms; Yuan poetry of death and destruction (sangluan); Yuan opera; and, increased use of the vernacular.

=== Jurchen influence ===
The Jurchens were a Tungusic people who inhabited the region of Manchuria (present-day Northeast China) until the 17th century, when they adopted the name Manchu. Certainly, the rhythms of Jurchen music, at least as moderated through the Yuan opera, greatly influenced the fixed-rhythm types of Yuan poetry.

=== Buddhism, Daoism, and Confucianism ===
The three major religious influences in Yuan China also appear in Yuan poetry, in various ways.

=== Painting and calligraphy ===
To what had become by this point, the traditional linkage between poetry, painting, and calligraphy, continued through the Yuan dynasty. An example of an artist in this respect is Gao Kegong (1248–1310), a poet, though more known for his ink-paintings of bamboos.

=== Fixed-tone verse forms ===
Development of various fixed-tone verse forms are particularly associated with Yuan poetry. Ci, qu, and sanqu were all popular during the Yuan poetry period. They were a fixed-tone and length meter type of verse, often with variable length lines linked to musical melodies now generally no longer extant. Many of these tunes were introduced into China from the north or west.

==== Ci ====
The origins of cí (simplified Chinese: 词; traditional Chinese: 詞; pinyin: qǔ; Wade–Giles: chü)type of lyric poetry are obscure, but seem to begin to appear in literature beginning in the poetry of the Liang dynasty, with minor subsequent development in the Tang dynasty. The Song dynasty then became renowned for its cí. The cí form were lyrics which developed from anonymous popular songs into a sophisticated literary genre, which actually followed the tradition encountered in the Shi Jing and the yuefu. The cí form involved lyrics written to set patterns, usually with lines of irregular length, and, generally many cí would be written in the fixed verse forms derived from popular musical measures. Many of the cí form fixed-rhythm patterns have an origin in Central Asia. Cí use a set of poetic meters derived from a base set of certain patterns, in fixed-rhythm, fixed-tone, and variable line-length formal types, or model examples. The rhythmic and tonal pattern of the ci are based upon certain, definitive musical song tunes. The Cí form of poetry had a roll during the Yuan, but the Qu form is more characteristic.

==== Qu ====
The Qu (Chinese: 曲; pinyin: qǔ; Wade–Giles: chü) form of poetry from Yuan dynasty may be called Yuanqu (元曲 P: Yuánqǔ, W: Yüan-chü) form of poetry is a type of Classical Chinese poetry form, consisting of words written in one of a number of certain, set tone patterns, based upon the tunes of various songs. Thus Qu poems are lyrics with lines of varying longer and shorter lengths, set according to the certain and specific, fixed patterns of rhyme and tone of conventional musical pieces upon which they are based and after which these matched variations in lyrics (or individual Qu poems) generally take their name.

==== Sanqu ====
When qu derive from Chinese opera, such as the Zaju (雜劇), in these cases these qu may be referred to as sanqu (散曲). The San in Sanqu refers to the detached status of the Qu lyrics of this verse form: in other words, rather than being embedded as part of an opera performance the lyrics stand separately on their own. Since the Qu became popular during the late Southern Song dynasty, and reached a special height of popularity in the poetry of the Yuan dynasty, therefore it is often called Yuanqu (元曲), specifying the type of Qu found in Chinese opera typical of the Yuan dynasty era. Both Sanqu and Ci are lyrics written to fit a different melodies, but Sanqu differs from Ci in that it is more colloquial, and is allowed to contain Chenzi (襯字 "filler words" which are additional words to make a more complete meaning). Sanqu can be further divided into Xiaoling (小令) and Santao (散套), with the latter containing more than one melody.

=== Yuan poetry of death and destruction (sangluan) ===
A certain genre of Classical Chinese poetry is known as sangluan (traditional Chinese: 喪亂; simplified Chinese: 丧乱; pinyin: sāngluàn; Wade–Giles: sang-luan). This type of verse has to do with the death and destruction of war, especially that which lead up to and was involved in the initial establishment of the Yuan dynasty and the consolidation of its power. In fact, according to one student of Yuan drama in this period, J. I. Crump:

Much poetry written during this period is called sang-luan verse, or "poetry of death and destruction," and sang-luan verse in many ways is a far more accurate measure of the emotional battering the Chinese underwent at the hands of the Mongols than any amount of historical documentation.

Practitioners include Yuan Haowen.

=== Yuan opera ===
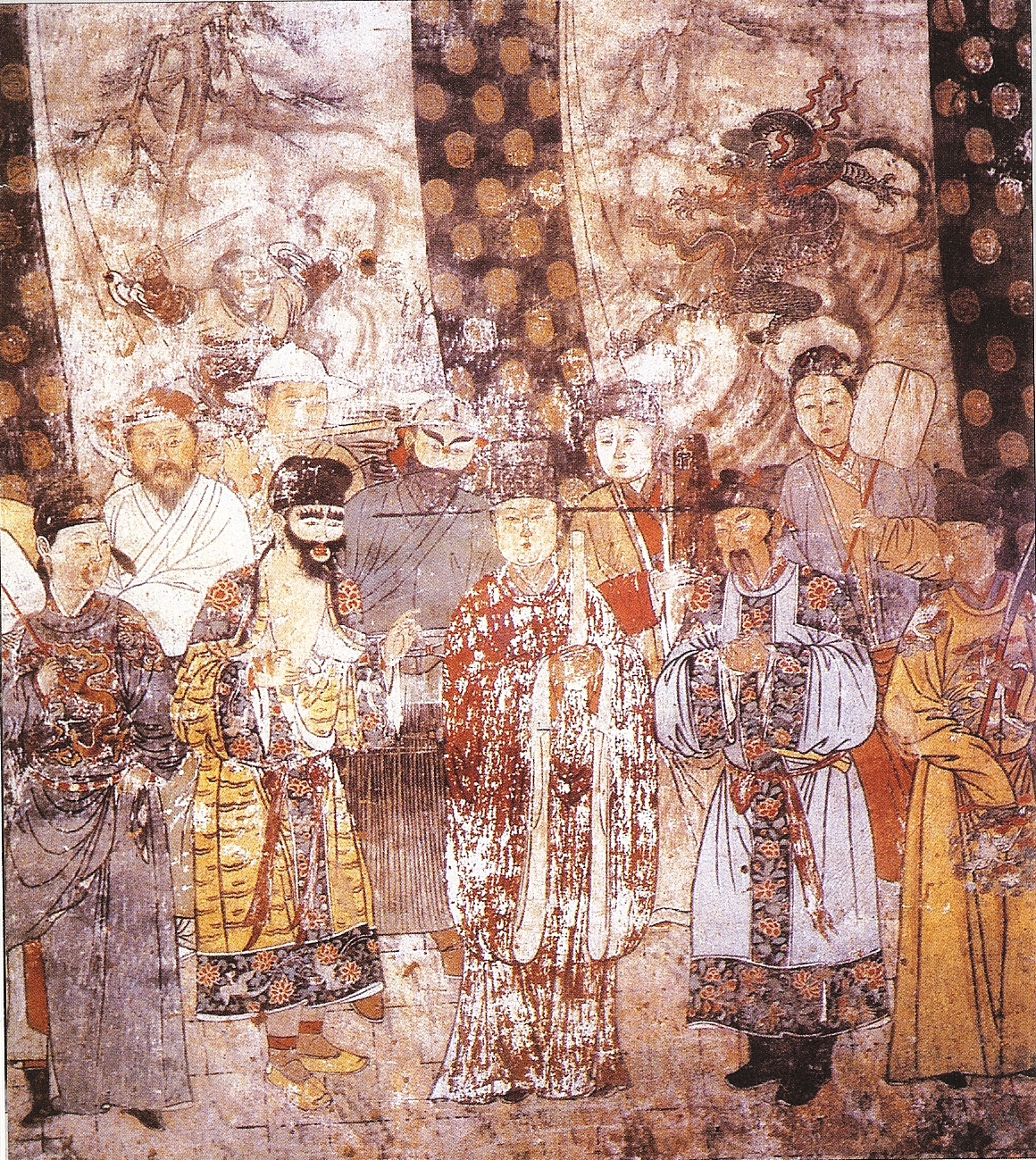
In mid Imperial China, characters in theatrical performances wore elaborate costumes and stereotyped facial makeup, shown here in a large Yuan dynasty (1279–1368 AD) mural in a hall of the Guangsheng Temple in Hongtong, Shanxi province.

Surviving knowledge of the Yuan opera, such as through written scripts, allows some insight. Yuan opera was a type of opera, or more specifically Chinese opera, which as a theatrical art form allowed for a large amount of poetic material to be integrated into it, in various ways; although, as the tradition no longer exists in its historical form, most of the knowledge thereof relies upon literary sources: however, this sourcing has indeed favored the survival of the incorporated poetry involved in these performances. During the Yuan dynasty the prestige of both theater and of the use of vernacular language in art and literature were probably related to the fact that the new Mongol dominated regime less understood the older, classical language and forms. Rather, the new Mongol elite appreciated the theater and the use of vernacular language. Compared to the traditional Chinese shì, or scholar-officials or emperors, the newcomers were not so literarily erudite or oriented, much less were they appreciative of the ancient forms, expressions, and allusions, legacy of more than a millennium. The Zaju theater took much of its characteristics from both this emphasis on the vernacular speech, as well as the lowered prestige of traditional scholarly literature. Also, founding emperor Khubilai Khan suspended the traditional civil service tests, which emphasized learning of the ancient classical tradition, thus both lowering the prestige of this course of learning and also reducing the opportunities for scholar-officials to engage in traditional career paths. This resulted in opportunities for aspiring playwrights to write for zaju, both for those playwrights relatively new to literature and for those members of the traditional shi class who could no longer succeed as poets and essayists, and were willing to embrace the zaju. The long-term legacy of the zaju theater was thus not only regarding the development of Chinese opera over subsequent centuries into the present day; but, also, despite the ensuing Ming dynasty restoration of prestige to legacy literary forms, the zaju form contributed to the increased prestige and popularity of vernacular forms such as the novel which ensued in the Ming dynasty literature some of which also embed poetry. A new emphasis on the use of the then current, vernacular Chinese appears during the period of Yuan dynasty poetry. much of the poetry of the Yuan period is in the form of the qu poetry verse, which basically became an independent form of art, removed from its original theatrical and orchestral context: written after the model of the cadences, or set tone patterns, known from the arias of the zaju theater, the Chinese Sanqu poetry eventually became a separate tradition, in the category of poetic literature, rather than in the category of the performing arts.

== Cultural legacy ==
In 1368, the Yuan dynasty was overthrown by revolution, which ended with the establishment of the Ming dynasty. The poetic legacy then entered a new phase, namely that of Ming poetry, which lasted to the end of Ming, in 1644, and beyond.

== See also ==
- Bai Renfu, also known as Bo Pu or Bai Pu
- Category:Yuan dynasty poets
- Chinese Sanqu poetry
- Classical Chinese poetry
- Classical Chinese poetry forms
- Gao Bing
- Guan Hanqing
- Hu Zhiyu
- Jayaatu Khan, Emperor Wenzong of Yuan
- Lu Zhi (poet)
- Ma Zhiyuan
- Ni Zan
- Qiao Ji
- Qu (poetry)
- Shang Ting
- Three perfections – integration of calligraphy, poetry and painting
- Wang Heqing
- Wang Yun (Yuan dynasty)
- Wu Zhen
- Xu Zaisi
- Yang Weizhen
- Zaju
- Zhang Shunzi
- Zhao Mengfu
- Zheng Yunduan
- Zheng Guangzu
- Zhongyuan Yinyun
