= Zhu Su (disambiguation) =

Zhu Su (1361–1425) was a Song dynasty Chinese physician, botanist, scientist; surnamed Zhu

Zhu Su, Zhu-su, Zhusu may also refer to:

Given name Su, Surnamed Zhu

- Su Zhu (businessperson), Singaporean businessman, a founder of cryptocurrency hedge fund Three Arrows Capital in the 2010s

Given name Zhu, Surnamed Su

- Hua Guofeng (1921–2008; born Su Zhu), Chinese Communist Party official, who served as Chairman and Premier

== See also ==
- The dictionary definition of sùzhǔ at Wiktionary
- Su Zhu (disambiguation)
