= Prince of Zhou (Ming dynasty) =

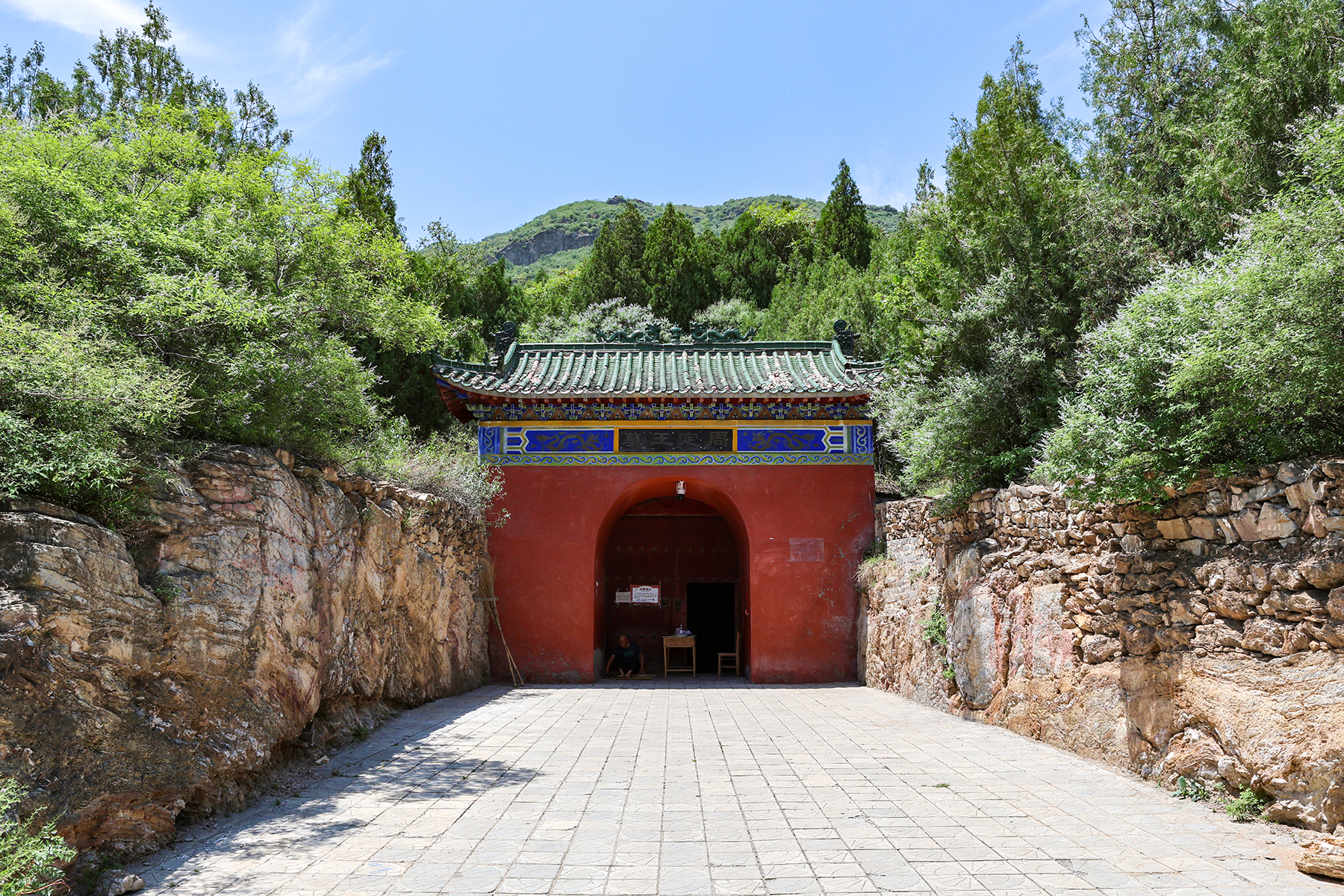
Tomb of Zhu Su, the first Prince of Zhou, in present-day Yuzhou, Henan

Prince of Zhou (Note: Chinese: 周王; pinyin: Zhōu Wáng) was a princely peerage used in China during the Ming dynasty (1368–1644). The dynasty, founded by the Hongwu Emperor after his successful rebellion against the Mongol-led Yuan dynasty, established a distinctive system of princely enfeoffment that became one of the most important political institutions governing the imperial clan. To consolidate imperial rule, the Hongwu Emperor adopted a system modeled on that of the Han dynasty, granting his sons hereditary princely domains (fiefs) in major cities and strategic frontier strongholds throughout the empire. (Note: The Hongwu Emperor granted princely titles to nine of his sons in 1370, five more in 1378, and another ten in 1391.) These fiefs were intended to extend imperial authority across the country and provide military support to the throne. By the reign of the Chongzhen Emperor (1627–1644), more than eighty princely investitures had been made, and the imperial clan had grown to over one million members.

In May 1370, the Hongwu Emperor granted the titles of princes (王; Wáng) to nine of his sons, including his fifth son Zhu Su, who was named the Prince of Wu (吳王; Wú Wáng) with his fief at Hangzhou, a major city in the Jiangnan region. In 1374, however, the Hongwu Emperor refused to allow Zhu Su to take up residence in Hangzhou, arguing that the revenues of Jiangnan were vital to the central government and should remain under its direct control. Four years later, Zhu Su's title was changed to Prince of Zhou, and his fief was established in Kaifeng, the capital of Henan. In 1398, Zhu Su was stripped of his title by his nephew, the Jianwen Emperor, as part of a policy of reducing the power of the princely feudatories. After the Jianwen Emperor was overthrown by Zhu Su's brother, Zhu Di, who ascended the throne as the Yongle Emperor in 1402, Zhu Su was restored to his title. From 1381, when Zhu Su took up residence in his fief, until the fall of the Ming dynasty in 1644, the Zhou Princedom was inherited by thirteen successive princes, including those who received the title posthumously. Over the generations, the princely house produced a large number of descendants. According to the Veritable Records of Shenzong, "among the current imperial clans throughout the empire, none outnumbers that of the Zhou Princedom". The number of clan members grew steadily from the early Ming period, exceeding 4,000 by the beginning of the Longqing era (1567–1572), and reaching 32,897 during the Wanli era (1572–1620).

The Zhou Princedom of Kaifeng and the Jin Princedom of Taiyuan were the two most populous branches of the imperial family among all the Ming princedoms. Unlike most other princely houses, however, the Zhou Princedom developed a strong tradition of cultural and literary learning. Beginning with Zhu Su, this scholarly ethos was passed down through successive generations, fostering a lasting literary culture within the princely house and producing numerous scholars and literati. (Note: For example, Zhu Youhuang (朱有爌), the eighth son of Zhu Su, was fond of learning and skilled in poetry, painting, calligraphy, horse archery, and cuju. Another notable member of the Zhou princely house was Zhu Mujie (朱睦㮮; 1517–1586), a great-great-grandson of Zhu Youhuang and one of its most distinguished scholars. Holding the rank of Defender-Commandant of the State, he was an avid reader and bibliophile who amassed a library of more than one thousand titles comprising nearly fifty thousand juan (volumes). To catalogue this collection, he compiled the Wanjuantang shumu (萬卷堂書目). From 1577 until his death, he headed the school of the Zhou Princedom. In addition to his catalogue, he authored several works on the Confucian Classics and on the history of the Jianwen period. His extensive scholarship and literary activities made him one of the leading intellectual figures among the Ming imperial princes and exemplified the strong scholarly tradition of the Zhou princely house.)

The Prince Zhou Palace was built on the foundations of the Song dynasty imperial palace, located north of the Kaifeng city center. Its scale was unmatched among the princely palaces of the Ming dynasty, making it both the most representative and one of the most distinctive examples of Ming princely architecture. Compared with other princely palaces, it is particularly well documented through surviving historical records and archaeological remains. The planning and layout of the palace were influenced by the Rites of Zhou and principles of fengshui, while also drawing upon architectural traditions and regulations inherited from the Song and Yuan imperial palaces. Nevertheless, it remained distinct from both other Ming princely palaces and the imperial palace in the capital.

== List of princes ==
shading, with (posthumous) in the "Tenure" column, indicates individuals who received the title posthumously.

Prince of Zhou (周王)
Personal name	Posthumous name	Tenure	Succession	Life details
Zhu Su 朱橚	Ding 定	1378–1425	Son of the Hongwu Emperor	8 October 1361 – 2 September 1425 Authored the herbal treatise Jiuhuang bencao ("Famine Relief Herbal"), a pioneering work on edible wild plants, and compiled more than 60,000 medical prescriptions. Also a skilled calligrapher. Died of natural causes.
Zhu Youdun 朱有燉	Xian 憲	1426–1439	Son of Zhu Su	7 February 1379 – 8 July 1439 A renowned poet, writer, and playwright, particularly in the zaju genre. Died of natural causes and had no children.
Zhu Youjue 朱有爝	Jian 簡	1439–1452	Son of Zhu Su, younger brother of Zhu Youdun	?–1452 Initially named Prince of Xiangfu (祥符王). Died of natural causes.
Zhu Zihou 朱子垕	Jing 靖	1455–1456	Son of Zhu Youjue	?–1456 Died of natural causes and had no children
Zhu Zifang 朱子埅	Yi 懿	1457–1485	Son of Zhu Youjue, younger brother of Zhu Zihou	?–1485 Initially named Prince of Tongxu (通許王). Died of natural causes.
Zhu Tong'ao 朱同䥝	Hui 惠	1487–1498	Son of Zhu Zifang	?–1498 Initially named Prince of Suiyang (睢陽王). Died of natural causes.
Zhu Anheng 朱安㶇	Dao 悼	(posthumous)	Son of Zhu Tong'ao	?–1489 Named heir apparent in 1487, but predeceased his father. Died of natural causes.
Zhu Mushen 朱睦㰂	Gong 恭	1501–1528	Son of Anheng, grandson of Zhu Tong'ao	?–1528 Initially named Defender-General of the State (鎭國將軍; zhenguo jiangjun). Died of natural causes.
Zhu Qinxi 朱勤熄	Kang 康	(posthumous)	Son of Zhu Mushen	?–1530 Named heir apparent in 1516, but predeceased his father. Died of natural causes.
Zhu Chaogang 朱朝堈	Zhuang 莊	1540–1551	Son of Qinxi, grandson of Zhu Mushen	?–1551 Died of natural causes
Zhu Zaiting 朱在鋌	Jing 敬	1552–1583	Son of Zhu Chaogang	?–1583 Died of natural causes
Zhu Suqin 朱肅溱	Duan 端	1586–1635	Son of Zhu Zaiting	?–1635 Named heir apparent in 1572. Died of natural causes.
Zhu Gongxiao 朱恭枵	Xiao 孝	Possibly 1635 (Note: Historian Fang Chao-ying states that Zhu Gongxiao inherited the title in 1589, while other sources give 1621. Since his father remained Prince of Zhou until 1635, however, Zhu Gongxiao could not have succeeded to the title before that year. The earlier dates may refer to his appointment as heir apparent rather than his accession to the princedom.)–1644	Son of Zhu Suqin	?–? Named heir apparent in 1589. Participated in the defense of Kaifeng against the rebel forces of Li Zicheng in 1641. According to historian Fang Chao-ying in the Dictionary of Ming Biography, 1368–1644, after the fall of the Ming, he fled south and served at the court of the Ming pretender Zhu Yihai. Other sources state that following the fall of Kaifeng in 1642, he fled to Zhangde (present-day Anyang, Henan) and died there in 1644. He was later granted the posthumous name "Xiao" by the Hongguang Emperor. (Note: After the death of Zhu Gongxiao, his son Zhu Shaojiong (朱绍烱) surrendered to the Manchu-led Qing dynasty, which had taken control of northern China following the fall of the Ming. He was executed in 1646. Zhu Shaojiong's son, Zhu Lunkui (朱倫奎), claimed the title of Prince of Zhou in 1645, but was killed by Qing forces the following year. Zhu Lunkui's younger brother, Zhu Lusheng (朱倫聖), fled to Taiwan together with the Ming loyalist Zheng Chenggong. After Zheng's grandson, Zheng Keshuang, surrendered to the Qing in 1683, Zhu Lusheng's subsequent fate is unknown.)
