= Zhu Youdun =

Chinese prince and playwright (1379–1439)

Zhu Youdun 朱有燉
- Prince of Zhou
- Born: 7 February 1379
- Died: 8 July 1439 (aged 60)
- Spouse: Lady Lü
Posthumous name
- Prince Xian of Zhou (Note: Simplified Chinese: 周宪王; traditional Chinese: 周憲王; pinyin: Zhōu Xiànwáng)
- House: Zhu
- Father: Zhu Su
- Mother: Lady Feng

Chinese name
- Traditional Chinese: 朱有燉
- Simplified Chinese: 朱有炖
Transcriptions
Standard Mandarin
- Hanyu Pinyin: Zhū Yǒudùn

Zhu Youdun (7 February 1379 – 8 July 1439) was an imperial prince of the Ming dynasty of China. He was the eldest son of Zhu Su, Prince of Zhou, who was the fifth son of the Hongwu Emperor, the first emperor of the dynasty. He was renowned for his talents as a poet, writer, and playwright, particularly in the zaju genre.

During the Jianwen Emperor's reign (1398–1402), the imperial court implemented a policy to weaken the princes, leading to Zhu Youdun and his father being stripped of their titles and reduced to commoner status, followed by exile to Yunnan. Their titles were only restored in 1402 after the Yongle Emperor took the throne. After his father's death in 1425, Zhu Youdun succeeded him as Prince of Zhou and ruled for nearly 14 years. In 1439, he died in his princely seat in Kaifeng, and was given the posthumous name Prince Xian of Zhou.

== Early life ==
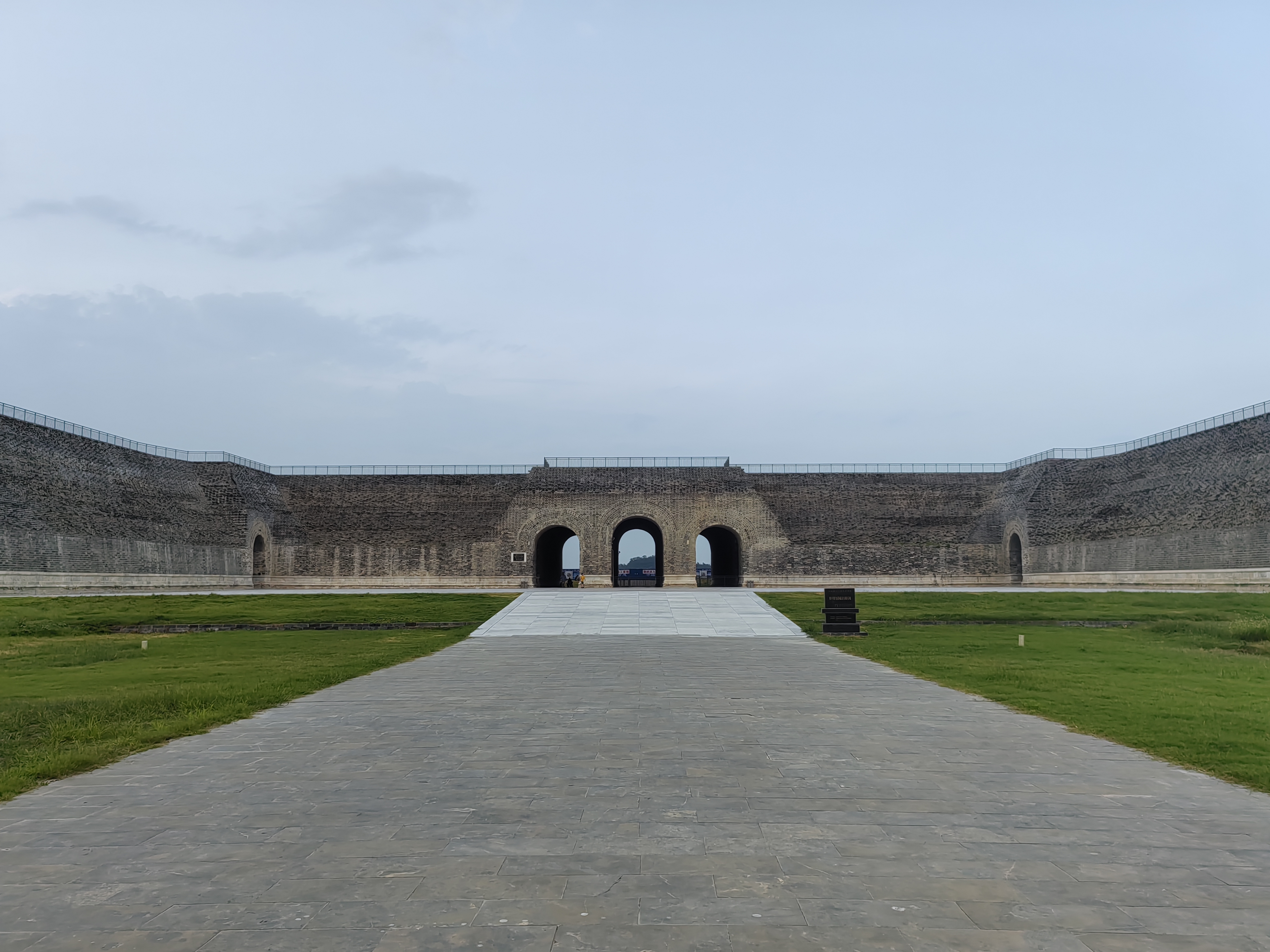
Ruins of the Ming central capital, where Zhu Youdun was born.

Zhu Youdun was born on 7 February 1379 in Fengyang, the central capital of China's Ming dynasty, as the eldest son of Zhu Su, Prince of Zhou. Zhu Su was the fifth son of the Hongwu Emperor, the first emperor of the dynasty. Zhu Youdun's mother was Zhu Su's first wife and a daughter of the general Feng Sheng. He lived with his father in Fengyang and later moved to Kaifeng, the capital of Henan Province, in 1381. In 1389, when Zhu Su went to Fengyang without permission, he was punished with exile to the southeastern Chinese province of Yunnan but was in fact imprisoned in Nanjing. Zhu Youdun was then nominally put in charge of the princely household. His father did not return to Kaifeng until late 1391 or early 1392. During this time, Zhu Youdun was named his father's heir apparent (世子) by the Emperor in the spring of 1391.

In 1395, Zhu Youdun married the daughter of the military commander Lü Gui (呂貴). The following year, he participated in military campaigns in the Beijing area on the northern border.

In 1398, the Hongwu Emperor died and was succeeded by his grandson, the Jianwen Emperor. Determined to centralize power, the new emperor embarked on a policy to weaken the influence of the princes, including Zhu Su and his full brother Zhu Di—the fourth son of the Hongwu Emperor and the most formidable among them. Zhu Su became the first victim of this purge when his second son, Zhu Youxun, allegedly accused him of treason. Zhu Su, along with his entire household and servants, was arrested and transported to Nanjing as a prisoner. In Nanjing, Zhu Youdun accepted all charges to protect his father, but both were demoted to the status of ordinary subjects and exiled to Yunnan. In 1399, Zhu Di rebelled and after a three-year civil war, the Jianwen Emperor was defeated and Zhu Di took the throne as the Yongle Emperor. He then summoned Zhu Su and Zhu Youdun back to Nanjing and restored their titles and palace in Kaifeng in early 1403, and Zhu Youxun was exiled to Yunnan. The Yongle Emperor was impressed by Zhu Youdun's loyalty to his father, which he had demonstrated in 1398. The Emperor even composed a poem himself to praise Zhu Youdun.

Zhu Youdun then lived in Kaifeng and wrote his first plays in the zaju genre. In the second decade of the 15th century, he shifted his focus to painting and calligraphy rather than theatre. He also collected calligraphy and published works by old masters. For example, in 1417, he published a collection of five versions of Wang Xizhi's famous Preface [to the Collection written during] the Purification Ceremony at Orchid Pavilion. Although his paintings have not survived, they were described in the poems of Kaifeng high-ranking official Li Changqi. Zhu Youdun enjoyed painting flowers, particularly peonies. He was personally acquainted with writer-storyteller Qu You, who served as a tutor in the household of the Prince of Zhou from 1403 to 1408, and Li Changqi, who served as the left administration commissioner of Henan from 1425 to 1439, with a brief interlude. It is possible that their influence led Zhu Youdun to emphasize the importance of plot in his theoretical works on theatrical plays. Another important poet and writer in Kaifeng was Yu Qian, who served as the grand coordinator in Henan and Shaanxi provinces from 1430 to 1447.

== Prince of Zhou ==
In September 1425, Zhu Youdun's father died, and on 3 January 1426, he officially became the Prince of Zhou. After a hiatus, Zhu Youdun returned to writing plays in the late 1420s and continued to do so for the next decade, producing over thirty zaju plays. He was considered the most prolific and influential playwright of his time. His plays can be categorized into two distinct groups. The first group comprises celebratory works that were specifically created to be performed during court festivities, holidays, and anniversaries. These plays often feature elaborate scenes with multiple groups of dancers and singers, as well as special effects. On the other hand, the second group of Zhu Youdun's plays are classical zaju pieces that focus on promoting the virtues of a loyal courtier. In contrast, some of these plays also satirize dishonest merchants and disloyal courtiers. In addition to his plays, Zhu Youdun also wrote poetry, mainly in the genres of shi and sanqu. Only a small portion of his works have survived, including 46 shi poems, a collection of three hundred sanqu songs, and a single ci poem. He also wrote a medical book called Xiuzhenfang (Handy Prescriptions).

As Zhu Youdun had no children, he adopted Zhu Youxun’s eldest son. However, after Zhu Su's death, Zhu Youxun requested that his son be returned to him in hopes of increasing his chances of inheriting the title of Prince of Zhou. In the mid-1420s, Zhu Youxun, after being rehabilitated by the Yongle Emperor in 1422, had aspirations of succeeding Zhu Youdun, but in 1428, he (along with Zhu Youxi, Zhu Su's fifth son) became embroiled in a conspiracy against the Xuande Emperor (r. 1425–1435), resulting in his demotion to a commoner and imprisonment in Beijing. On 8 July 1439, Zhu Youdun died and was given the posthumous name Prince Xian of Zhou (周憲王). Shortly before his death, he petitioned Emperor Yingzong (r. 1435–1449) to exempt his consorts from the custom of committing suicide following their husband's death and instead permit them to return to their families. The Emperor approved the request, but Zhu Youdun died before the decree reached Kaifeng. His wife and six concubines committed suicide on 29 July 1439 and were buried with him. The title of Prince of Zhou was passed down to Zhu Su's third son, Zhu Youjue.

== Notes ==
Zhu Youdun House of Zhu Born: 7 February 1379 Died: 8 July 1439
Chinese royalty
Preceded by Zhu Su	Prince of Zhou; 1426–1439	Succeeded by Zhu Youjue
