= Tianranxiu =

Chinese Yuan Dynasty actress and singer

Tianranxiu (this was a stage name; her original family name was Gao) (second half of 13th-century) was a Chinese actress of the zaju theater. She was also a courtesan. She was described as a great beauty and is regarded as a national treasure in contemporary China, praised for her roles as heroine and as female members of the Imperial family, and counted Bai Pu and Li Gaizhi among her admirers.
