= Su Zhu =

Su Zhu, Su-zhu, or Suzhu, may refer to:

== People ==
- Su Zhu, birth name of Hua Guofeng (1921–2008), former Chairman of the Chinese Communist Party
- Zhu Su (1361–1425; Chinese: 朱橚), scientist, physician, botanist
- Su Zhu (businessperson), a founder of cryptocurrency hedge fund Three Arrows Capital in the 2010s

== Other uses ==
- Suzhu Lian (Chinese: 素珠链; pinyin: Sùzhū Liàn), Sunan Yugur Autonomous County, Zhangye Prefecture, Gansu Province, China
