= Shang Ting =

Shang Ting (Chinese: 商挺; 1209–1288), courtesy name Mengqing (孟卿), art name Zuoshan Laoren (左山老人), posthumous name Wending (文定), was a Chinese writer of sanqu poetry and official of the Yuan dynasty. He was also a noted calligrapher and landscape artist. Unfortunately, although a prolific poet, most of his writings have been lost. The surviving sanqu poems of the poet are all written to the same musical mode and song title. However, the content of the poems suggests they were written at different times. His son Shang Qi (商琦) was likewise an official and artist.

== Biography ==
Shang Ting was from Shandong Province. Shang and his entire family were on familiar terms with the poet and statesman Yuan Haowen (1190–1257). His uncle was the sanqu poet Shang Dao (商道; 1193?-1258?). Shang Ting served the Mongol monarch Kublai before he took the throne. Later there followed an array of official appointments. When the Yuan dynasty was officially founded in 1271, Shang was appointed Assistant Administrator in the Secretariat. In later life, he was implicated in a wrongful death case and was imprisoned twice. He was later found innocent, but never again took an official position. He died at age eighty and many posthumous titles followed.

== See also ==
- Classical Chinese poetry
- Classical Chinese poetry forms
- Classical Chinese poetry genres
- Qu (poetry)
