= Sangluan =

Sangluan (traditional Chinese: 喪亂; simplified Chinese: 丧乱; pinyin: sāngluàn; Wade–Giles: sang-luan, literally “Mourning and chaos poetry”) refers to a genre of Classical Chinese poetry particularly associated with the era of the Yuan Dynasty (1271–1368), in China. Written in response to the tumultuous events leading up to and during the establishment of the Yuan Dynasty by Kublai Khan and the Mongol Empire. This genre of the poetry of the Yuan Dynasty focuses on the devastation of war and its associated death and destruction, specifically in terms of this historical process. According to one student of Yuan drama in this period, J. I. Crump:

Much poetry written during this period is called sang-luan verse, or "poetry of death and destruction," and sang-luan verse in many ways is a far more accurate measure of the emotional battering the Chinese underwent at the hands of the Mongols than any amount of historical documentation.

Practitioners include Yuan Haowen.

== See also ==
- Classical Chinese poetry
- Classical Chinese poetry genres
- Yuan poetry
- Yuan Haowen
