= Tiancixiu =

Chinese acrobat and actress

Tiancixiu née Wang (mid 14th-century) was a Chinese acrobat and zaju actress.

She was famous for her roles as male heroes within the Robin Hood-type of (lülin-haohan), and for the skills in warfare technique and athletics which the roles demanded. She was the mentor of her colleagues Tianshengxiu (her daughter), Zhang Xinge and Chienshen, who all became famed actors in their own name.
