= Shi Zhang =

Yuan dynasty zaju playwright

Shi Zhang (Chinese: 史樟; c. 1240 – c. 1288) was a traditional Chinese playwright from the time of the Yuan dynasty. His zaju with the title Lao Zhuang Zhou yizhen hudie meng 老庄周一枕蝴蝶梦 ("Zhuang Zhou Dreams About Butterfly"), short Zhuang Zhou meng 庄周梦 ("The Dream of Zhuang Zhou"), is contained in the zaju-collection Guben Yuan-Ming zaju 孤本元明杂剧.

== Works ==
- Lao Zhuang Zhou yizhen hudie meng《老庄周一枕蝴蝶梦》 (Zhuang Zhou Dreams About Butterfly), abb. Zhuang Zhou meng 庄周梦

== See also ==
- The Butterfly Dream

== Bibliography ==
- Han-Ying Zhongguo wenxue cidian 漢英中国文学词典 Chinese-English Dictionary of Chinese Literature. Nanjing University Press 2004, ISBN 7305044024
