= Guangzu =

Guangzu is a Chinese given name. People with this name include:

- Zheng Guangzu (c. 1260 – c. 1320), Chinese dramatist
- Sheng Guangzu (born 1949), Chinese politician
- Lu Guangzu (born 1996), Chinese badminton player
