= The Departed Soul of a Beautiful Maiden =

Play written by Zheng Guangzu

The Departed Soul of a Beautiful Maiden (simplified Chinese: 倩女離魂; traditional Chinese: 倩女离魂; pinyin: qiàn nǚ lí hún; Jyutping: Sin6 Neoi5 Lei4 Wan4), also known as The Departed Soul of a Beautiful Maiden Dazed Behind the Green Latticework (迷青瑣倩女離魂), is a zaju (a type of Chinese opera) written by Yuan dynasty playwright Zheng Guangzu. It is adapted from the Tang dynasty chuanqi tale The Tale of the Leaving Soul (離魂記) by Chen Xuanyou (陳玄祐). There are four versions available today: the Ancient Masters' Zaju (古名家雜劇) version, the Selected Yuan Dynasty Plays (元曲選) version, the Guquzhai (顧曲齋) version, and the Liuzhi Collection (柳枝集) version. The complete version of The Departed Soul of a Beautiful Maiden is preserved in One Hundred Yuan Dramas (元曲選一百種), a collection of Yuan Dynasty zaju plays, which was published during the Wanli era of the Ming dynasty.

== Storyline ==
The core storyline of The Departed Soul of a Beautiful Maiden follows a powerful romantic journey where a young woman's love is so intense that her spirit physically detaches from her body to pursue her lover.

=== Act I: The Separation ===
Zhang Qiannu (張倩女) and her cousin, Wang Wenju (王文舉), were betrothed to each other by their parents before birth. After his parents pass away, Wang Wenju travels to the Zhang household to claim his bride. However, Zhang's mother, Madam Li, breaks the promise. She declares that no marriage can take place until Wang travels from his hometown Henghzou to the capital and passes the imperial examinations. Madam Li forces the lovers to address each other strictly as "brother and sister" and hurries Wang to depart for the capital immediately, leaving Zhang devastated.

=== Act II: The Separation of Soul and Body ===
Following Wang's departure, Zhang falls dangerously ill from grief, confined to her bed in her chamber. As Wang stops his boat along the riverbanks on his way to the capital, he is suddenly approached by Zhang in the middle of the night. She tells him she has run away from home to be with him. Unbeknownst to Wang, the woman on his boat is actually Zhang's detached soul, driven by her irrepressible desire for freedom and love. Meanwhile, her physical body remains bedridden and unconscious back at her mother's house.

=== Act III: The Letter of Misunderstanding ===
Believing he is traveling with the real, physical Zhang, Wang takes her to the capital. They live together happily as husband and wife for three years. Wang successfully passes the imperial examinations, achieving the highest rank and securing a prestigious government post. With his new status, he decides to write a letter to tell his mother-in-law the good news and inform her that he had married Zhang.

Meanwhile, in Henghzou, the physical body of Zhang is still trapped in her bed, wasting away from intense grief and missing her lover. Her mother and maids watch her health rapidly decline, completely unaware that her soul is currently living happily with Wang in the capital.

When the servant arrives with the letter, the bedridden Zhang reads it. In the letter, Wang writes that he will soon return home "bringing the Lady along with him" (referring to the soul-version of Zhang whom he legally married in the capital).

However, because the physical Zhang has been stuck at home the entire time, she utterly misinterprets the text. She assumes that Wang forgot their betrothal after finding success and the "Lady" he is bringing home is a new, wealthy high-society bride he married in the capital. Devastated by this perceived betrayal, Zhang experiences a profound emotional breakdown. In her grief, she famously sings that this joyful announcement letter feels no different than a letter of divorce, save for having a slightly fancier envelope wrapper. This misunderstanding causes her physical illness to reach a critical, near-fatal peak right before Wang actually arrives in Act IV.

=== Act IV: The Reunion ===
Upon arriving near the Zhang estate, Wang goes ahead to inform Madam Li of their return and his academic success. When he mentions that Zhang is waiting in the boat, Madam Li is shocked and furious. She claims Wang is lying, pointing out that the real Zhang has been bedridden and mute in her room for three whole years. Suspicious and confused, Wang goes to the bedridden Zhang to confront her, even drawing his sword, suspecting the woman on his boat might be a demon or an impostor. The Zhang from the boat walks into the house. As the two versions of Zhang approach each other in the courtyard, they instantly merge into a single entity. The physical body awakens, fully healed, possessing all the memories of the past three years spent in the capital. With the truth revealed, Madam Li happily accepts the marriage, and the play concludes with a grand celebration of their union.
