= Yuan Haowen =

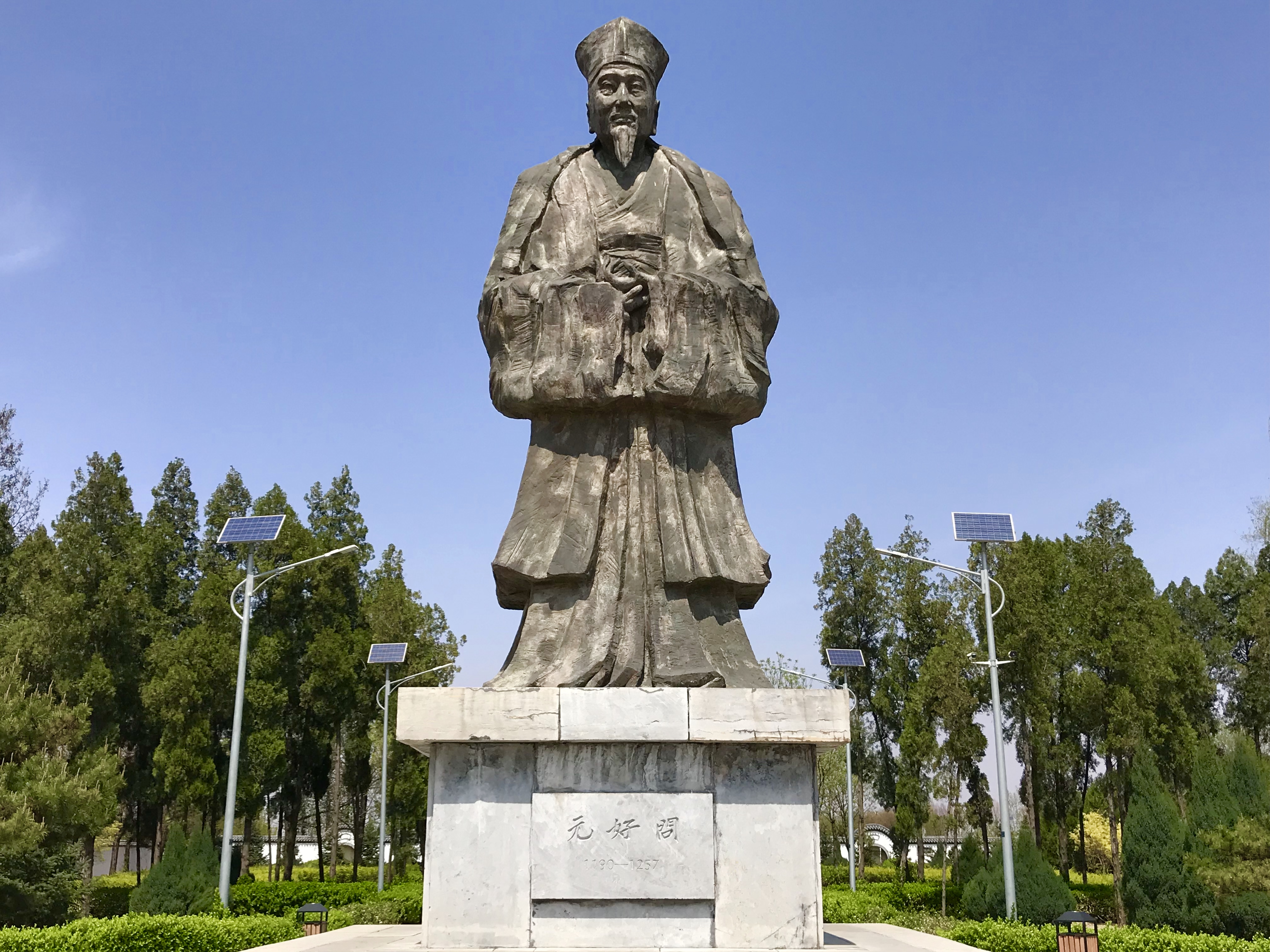
Statue of Yuan Haowen in Xinfu, Shanxi

Yuan Haowen (Chinese: 元好問; 1190–1257), courtesy name Yuzhi (裕之), art name Yishan (遺山), was a Chinese poet of the Jin dynasty and the Mongol Empire. He was born in Xinzhou. He is noted for his poems in the ci and the sanqu forms and for including poems in the sangluan genre of Classical Chinese poetry among his poetic works. Yuan Haowen was the outstanding literary figure of his period, excelling at various genres of both prose and poetry: his ci poetry is said to be some of the best of the Jin period writers. Just a few of his sanqu lyrics have survived.

== Biography ==
Yuan Haowen's ancestors were of non-Han origins who changed their surname to Yuan. His father experienced disappointments in life and later led a secluded existence. However he passed on his taste for literature to his son. An uncle who was a government official took the young Yuan along on his official journeys, thus introducing him to some well known places and scenery. He could compose poetry by the age of seven leading people to refer to him as a child prodigy. His uncle also saw to it that he studied with the best teachers. He prospered. Born at the height of the Jin dynasty (1115–1234), he experienced the social unrest and war at the decline of the dynasty. He fled to Henan with his mother when the Jin regime moved their capital. He had served the Jin in a variety of posts, but when the Jin dynasty gave way in favor of the Mongol Yuan Dynasty he no longer sought official appointments and went into retirement. In June, 1233, Yuan Haowen was captured and compelled to go to Shandong. For a time he was a destitute wanderer.

== See also ==
- Bai Renfu
- Classical Chinese poetry
- Classical Chinese poetry forms
- Classical Chinese poetry genres
- Daming Lake
- Shang Ting
