= Wang Heqing =

Wang Heqing (王和卿; c. 1260), a writer of Chinese Sanqu poetry, was a native of Daming in Hebei province. Other than his birthplace, which is noted in Zheng Sicheng's Record of Ghosts, nothing of certainty can be said of his life. The Ming period Chuo Genglu (輟耕錄), describes Wang as a friend of Guan Hanqing in Dadu, modern Beijing. It is also noted that Wang's lyric on the giant butterfly in the Beijing area was the beginning of his popularity as a writer in the 1260s. Of his sanqu lyrics, twenty-one short lyrics survive with one suite and fragments.
