= Ma Zhiyuan =

Chinese poet and playwright (c.1250–1321)

- Traditional Chinese: 馬致遠
- Simplified Chinese: 马致远
Transcriptions
Standard Mandarin
- Hanyu Pinyin: Mǎ Zhìyuǎn

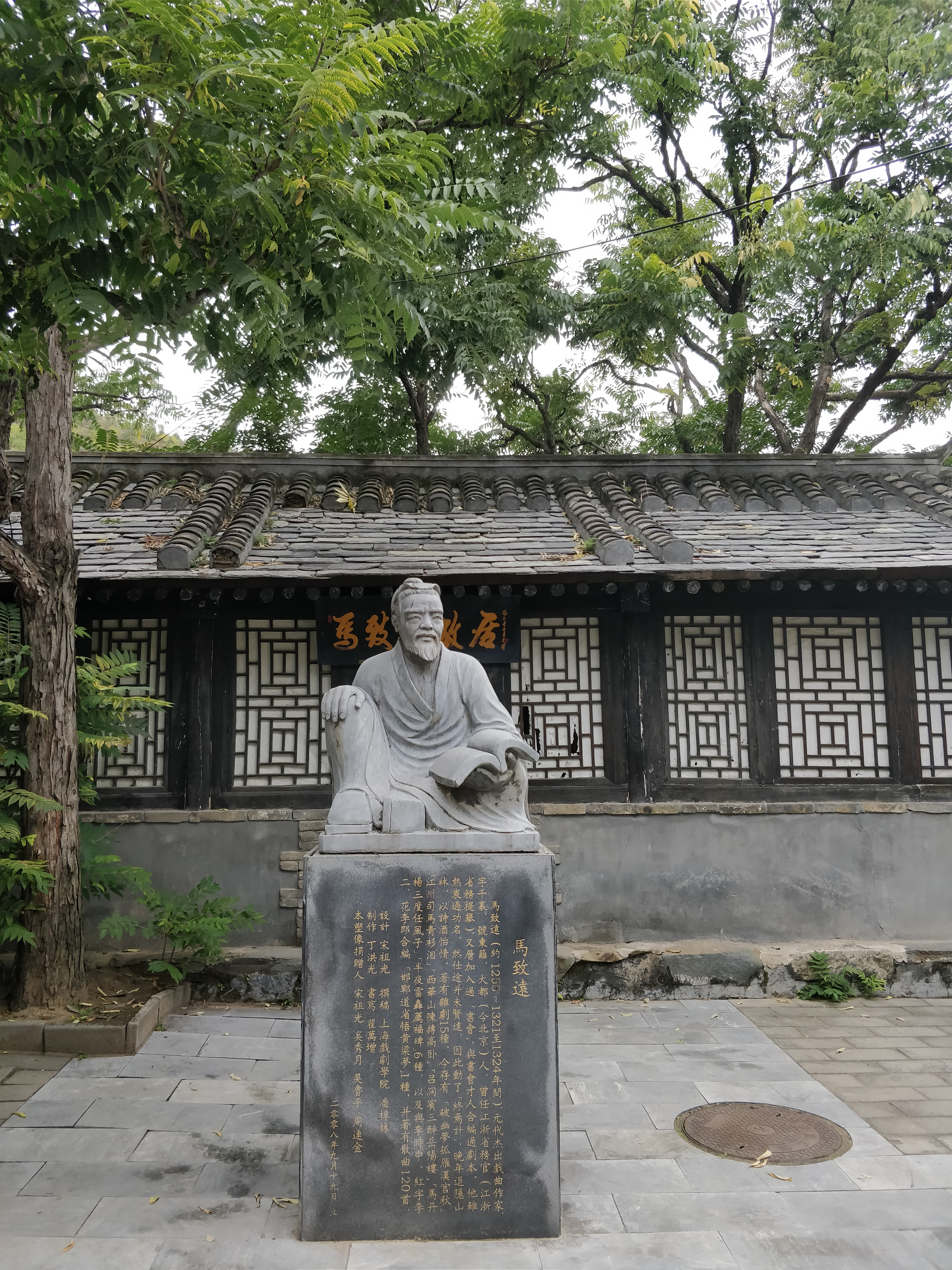
Statue of Ma Zhiyuan in the Former Residence of Ma Zhiyuan in Beijing.

Ma Zhiyuan (traditional Chinese: 馬致遠; simplified Chinese: 马致远, c. 1250–1321), courtesy name Dongli (traditional Chinese: 東籬; simplified Chinese: 东篱), Chinese dramatist, playwright, and poet during the Yuan dynasty.

Among his achievements is the development and popularizing of the sanqu (散曲) lyric type of Classical Chinese poetry forms. The poem "Autumn Thoughts" (秋思) is the most widely known of his sanqu poems.

His sanqu poems were collected in the book "Dongli Yuefu" (traditional Chinese: 東籬樂府; simplified Chinese: 东篱乐府; lit. 'The Eastern Fence Poetry'), where there were 104 single sanqu (Xiaoling 小令) and 17 song suites (Taoshu 套數).

== Works ==
=== Poems ===
Ma Zhiyuan's sanqu poem "Autumn Thoughts" (秋思), composed to the metric pattern Tianjingsha (天淨沙), uses ten images in twenty-two monosyllables to preamble a state of emotion, and is considered as the penultimate piece in Chinese poetry to convey the typical Chinese male literati's melancholy during late autumn:

《秋思》 Autumn Thoughts
枯藤老樹昏鴉。 Over old trees wreathed with rotten vines fly evening crows;
小橋流水人家。 Under a small bridge near a cottage a stream flows;
古道西風瘦馬。 On ancient road in the west wind a lean horse goes.
夕陽西下，斷腸人在天涯。 Westward declines the sun; Far, far from home is the heartbroken one.

=== Plays ===
Only seven of his 15 plays are extant, of which four have been translated into English:

- Autumn in Han Palace, 漢宮秋 (Full title: Breaking a Troubling Dream: A Lone Goose in Autumn over the Palaces of Han, 破幽夢孤雁漢宮秋). This play tells the story of Han Emperor Yuandi and Wang Zhaojun, and is considered the best example of Yuan theatre.
- The Yellow-Millet Dream, 黃粱夢 (Full title: On the Road to Handan, Awakening from a Dream Dreamt While Cooking Millet, 邯鄲道省悟黃粱夢)
- Yueyang Tower, 岳陽樓 (Full title: Lü Dongbin Gets Drunk Three Times in Yueyang Tower, 呂洞賓三醉岳陽樓)
- Tears on the Blue Gown, 青衫淚 (Full title: The Overseer of Jiangzhou: Tears on the Blue Gown, 江州司馬青衫淚)
- 任風子 (Full title: 馬丹陽三度任風子)
- 薦福碑 (Full title: 半夜雷轟薦福碑)
- 陳搏高臥 (Full title: 西華山陳搏高臥)

== See also ==
- Chinese Sanqu poetry
- Qu (poetry)
- Zaju
