= Three Arrows Capital =

Liquidated cryptocurrency hedge fund

- Type: Private
- Industry: Hedge fund
- Founded: 2012; 14 years ago
- Founders: Kyle Davies, Su Zhu
- Defunct: June 27, 2022; 4 years ago
- Fate: Liquidation; Bankruptcy
- Headquarters: Singapore
- Website: www.threearrowscap.com

Three Arrows Capital (also known as 3AC or TAC) was a Singapore-based cryptocurrency hedge fund which was ordered to liquidate on 27 June 2022 by a court in the British Virgin Islands. It was founded in 2012 by Kyle Davies and Su Zhu. The company borrowed billions of dollars to fund its trading, and according to July 2022 bankruptcy filings, faces $3.5 billion in creditors' claims. The fund lost in excess of $4.2 billion over 2021 and 2022, making its collapse one of the largest hedge-fund trading losses of all time. Liquidators for the bankruptcy estate of Three Arrows Capital, led by Teneo, have a total claim of $3.4 billion by 154 creditors against the failed crypto hedge fund.

== History ==
Kyle Davies and Su Zhu first met at Phillips Academy, and both studied at Columbia University before working for Credit Suisse for brief spells before setting up Three Arrows in 2012. In its early years, the company was focused on arbitraging emerging-market foreign-exchange derivatives and engaged in the practice of finding mispriced derivatives on electronic platforms and keeping them even if banks asked to cancel or amend the trades. This strategy, however, resulted in the fund only earning fractions of a cent for each dollar that was traded. This practice continued until banks started to cut off the fund from that market in 2017, which began the company's shift to cryptocurrencies.

The fund's last public statement claimed a net asset value of $18 billion. Blockchain analytics firm Nansen estimated in March 2022 that Three Arrows managed about $10 billion in cryptocurrency assets, although there is speculation that most of their visible assets were sourced by uncollateralized borrowing from various lending platforms.

The firm's founders amassed a large following on Twitter with cryptocurrency-related topics. Su Zhu had more than 500,000 followers shortly before the fund failed. The firm backed projects including Aave, Avalanche, Luna, Worldcoin, BlockFi, Deribit, Ethereum, Polkadot, Solana, and WOO Network. According to a January 2021 SEC filing, Three Arrows owned almost 39 million units of Grayscale Bitcoin Trust (GBTC) at the end of 2020. The firm invested approximately $200 million in LUNA tokens in February 2022.

In April 2022 Bloomberg reported that Three Arrows was planning to move its headquarters to Dubai from Singapore. However, on June 24, 2022, Dubai's regulator confirmed that Three Arrows was not registered with the Dubai Financial Services Authority.

Cryptocurrencies experienced broad declines in the first half of 2022, with most tokens losing more than 50% of their market valuation. LUNA, in which Three Arrows had invested and Su Zhu actively promoted on Twitter, collapsed to near zero in May 2022. The spread between Grayscale GBTC trust unit prices and spot Bitcoin prices widened throughout 2021 and 2022, with the trust units trading at a 34% discount to the trust NAV on 17 June 2022.

=== Licensing and regulatory issues ===
A class action, Patterson v. TerraForm Labs Pte Ltd. et al., was filed against Three Arrows and others in the United States District Court for the Northern District of California on 17 June 2022. This case has since been dismissed.

On 30 June 2022, the Monetary Authority of Singapore (MAS) said it had reprimanded Three Arrows for breaching its allowed threshold of having no more than $250 million Singapore dollars in assets under management, a condition of its August 2013 fund management company registration. Three Arrows was further reprimanded for providing false or misleading information to MAS, and failing to notify MAS of changes to directorships or shareholdings.

In October 2022, it was reported that Three Arrows Capital was under investigation by both the U.S. Securities and Exchange Commission and the Consumer Financial Protection Bureau to determine whether or not the firm had misled its investors over the status of its balance sheet, and if the firm should have registered with both agencies.

=== Liquidation ===
On 16 June 2022, the Financial Times reported that Three Arrows had failed to meet its margin calls. On 22 June, The Wall Street Journal reported that Three Arrows had failed to repay money lent from cryptocurrency broker Voyager Digital. On 27 June 2022, Voyager Digital issued a notice of default against Three Arrows for failing to make the required payments on a Bitcoin and USD Coin loan worth more than $665 million. On the same day, a court in the British Virgin Islands ordered the liquidation of Three Arrows Capital, overseen by Teneo. The Joint Liquidators are Russell Crumpler and Christopher Farmer, both Senior Managing Directors of Teneo.

On 2 July 2022, Three Arrows filed for Chapter 15 bankruptcy to protect its US assets from creditors. The firm's CEO, Stephen Ehrlich, attributed the decision in part due to Three Arrows' inability to pay back its loan from Voyager.

Genesis Trading's CEO Michael Moro announced on Twitter that Genesis Trading had incurred substantial losses from loans to Three Arrows and that its parent firm Digital Currency Group has assumed certain liabilities of Genesis related to Three Arrows to ensure adequate operating capital.

The company's collapse is believed to be partially responsible for the bankruptcy and failure of the crypto lender Voyager Digital and layoffs at Blockchain.com. FTX founder and CEO Sam Bankman-Fried blamed the company for causing a ripple effect that caused the bankruptcy of other crypto firms or led those firms to freeze assets during the 2022 cryptocurrency crash.

According to court liquidation papers, Davies and Zhu have not been cooperating in the liquidation process of Three Arrows Capital, and their whereabouts were unknown as of 8 July 2022. Three Arrows Capital owes 27 creditors a total of US$3.5 billion.

In an interview with Bloomberg held at an "undisclosed location" in July 2022, Zhu and Davies remarked that they plan to move to the United Arab Emirates, a country that does not have extradition agreements with either Singapore or the United States.

According to the New York Times, during the June 2022 liquidation process, Zhu and Davies were in Bali, where Zhu tried surfing, and Davies dabbled in painting. Since 2022, Zhu and his family relocated to Singapore, where they lived in a "good-class bungalow" with a "permaculture farm — an elaborate system of lakes and gardens meant to replicate self-sustaining ecosystems in nature. It's home to ducks, chickens and numerous types of dragonflies." Davies was described as having moved on from Three Arrows Capital and quoted as saying, "I really spent so much time meditating in Bali that I'm really just pretty zenned out."

In June 2023, Three Arrows liquidators said they were seeking to recover $1.3 billion from Davies and Zhu.

=== Arrest of Su Zhu ===
In late September 2023, Zhu was arrested at Changi Airport in Singapore, while trying to leave the country. Zhu was arrested pursuant to committal orders which sentenced him to four months in prison for failing to cooperate with the company's liquidators. Davies' location remained unknown, but he is subject to the same committal order as Zhu.

=== Continued Activities of Founders (2024) ===
==== OPNX ====
In late 2022, Zhu and Davies started another cryptocurrency-related venture called Open Exchange based in Hong Kong to some negative reactions from financial institutions and investors. In June 2023, Open Exchange began offering its own cryptocurrency, and Davies commented on Twitter that "I'm getting early 3AC vibes all over again... Nothing compares to the energy of a startup."

==== OX.FUN Exchange ====
In early 2024, Zhu and Davies joined as advisors for the OX.FUN exchange, a new platform that aims to merge features of centralized and decentralized exchanges. The platform offers gamified trading, high-yield products, and a dual-token model designed to attract crypto traders seeking diverse trading and yield strategies.

==== Three Arrowz Capitel ($3AC) Token ====
The founders also been connected to a token project called Three Arrowz Capitel ($3AC), launched in late 2024. The token, structured as a "memecoin," was marketed on various social media platforms and designed with a 1% transaction tax to provide liquidity and incentives for token holders. However, the token's launch was met with criticism due to its high concentration of insider-held supply and limited liquidity on decentralized exchanges, leading to significant price volatility.
