= Zheng Guangzu =

Yuan dynasty playwright

Zheng Guangzu (traditional Chinese: 鄭光祖; simplified Chinese: 郑光祖; pinyin: Zhèng Guāngzǔ), courtesy name 德輝 Dé Huī, was a Chinese playwright, who was born in about 1260 and died around 1320.

He was one of the most celebrated of the playwrights who flourished during the second period of the zaju (雜劇, pinyin: zájù), the name given to the most highly rated form of opera during the Yuan dynasty, and of sanqu 散曲, pinyin: sănqŭ (a variety of Chinese fixed-tone song-lyric, with many different possible stanza-forms). He has traditionally always been numbered among the Four Great Yuan Dramatists (元曲四大家, pinyin: Yuánqǔsìdàjiā).

Zheng Guangzu was born in Pingyang (today's Hongchao, Xiangfen county, Shanxi province). Along with other playwrights, he helped to bring about the revival of interest in zaju drama throughout the south, particularly in Hangzhou. Eighteen plays are attributed to him, only eight of which are still extant. In the case of five of these his authorship is undisputed. These include Zhōugōng Shèzhèng (The Duke of Zhou Acts as Regent, 周公攝政), Wáng Càn Dēng Lóu (Wang Can Ascends the Tower, 王粲登樓), Hànlín Fēngyuè (Wind and Moon in the Hanlin Academy, 翰林風月, whose fuller and more informative title is How Pretty ‘Fragrant Plum-Blossom’ Swindled the Hanlin Academician: a Romance 㑳梅香騙翰林風月) and Qiànnǚ Líhún (The Departed Soul of a Beautiful Maiden, 倩女離魂). The last of these is the best-known, and almost certainly inspired the far more famous Ming dynasty play Mudan Ting by Tang Xianzu.

Translations

• West, Stephen H. West and Idema, Wilt L., Monks, Bandits, Lovers and Immortals: Eleven Early Chinese Plays, Hackett Publishing Company, 2010, pp. 195–236 (Dazed behind the Green Ring Lattice, Qiannü’s Soul Leaves Her Body)

• Le Mal d’amour de Qiannü ou L’Âme qui se sépara de son corps, comédie en prose et en vers composée par Zheng Guangzu (1265 ?-1330 ?), [a cura di] Isabella Falaschi, Trieste, Università degli Studi, 2001, p. 209 ff.
