= Voyager Digital =

Liquidated cryptocurrency hedge fund

- Type: Private
- Industry: Hedge fund
- Founded: 2018; 8 years ago
- Defunct: July 5, 2022; 4 years ago
- Fate: Liquidation
- Headquarters: New York
- Website: www.investvoyager.com

Voyager Digital was a cryptocurrency brokerage company founded in 2018.

== History ==
In June 2022, Voyager Digital announced that Three Arrows Capital had not repaid loans totaling $666 Million.

On July 1, the company suspended “trading, deposits, withdrawals and loyalty rewards” and subsequently on July 5, the company filed for Chapter 11 bankruptcy protection.

Later in July, the Federal Reserve and the FDIC in a joint letter ordered the company to cease and desist from making false and misleading statements.

In August, the company received approval from a judge to return $270 million in customer cash, which was locked up after the company’s bankruptcy filing in July. The money accounted for only a small portion of total investor funds.

In September, Binance and FTX both made nearly $50 million bids for the company. FTX would win the auction with a nearly $50 million bid. In November, FTX filed for bankruptcy and Voyager Digital had to find a new buyer. A major investor in Voyager said that the collapse of FTX puts into jeopardy the company's bailout, with $1.3 billion of investor assets threatened. Following the bankruptcy of FTX, the US subsidiary of Binance won the bid to buy the assets of Voyager for approximately $1 billion in December 2022. The U.S. Securities and Exchange Commission (SEC) has filed a limited objection to Binance US's proposed $1 billion acquisition of bankrupt cryptocurrency lender Voyager Digital, a bankruptcy court filing showed in January 2023.
