= Zhu Su =

Chinese prince and botanist (1361–1425)

Zhu Su 朱橚
- Prince of Zhou
- Born: 8 October 1361
- Died: 2 September 1425 (aged 63)
- Burial: Prince Ding of Zhou's Tomb (周定王陵; in present-day Yuzhou, Henan)
- Spouse: Lady Feng
Posthumous name
- Prince Ding of Zhou (Note: Chinese: 周定王; pinyin: Zhōu Dìngwáng)
- House: Zhu
- Father: Hongwu Emperor
- Mother: Empress Ma

Chinese name
- Chinese: 朱橚
Transcriptions
Standard Mandarin
- Hanyu Pinyin: Zhū Sù

Zhu Su (8 October 1361 – 2 September 1425) was a prince of the Ming dynasty of China, as well as a medical scientist and botanist. He was the fifth son of the Hongwu Emperor and Empress Ma. In 1370, he was made the Prince of Wu, and in 1378, his title was changed to Prince of Zhou. He was assigned to Kaifeng in 1381.

In 1389, the Hongwu Emperor banished Zhu Su to Yunnan for leaving his fief without permission. After his father's death, Zhu Su became the first major target of the policies introduced by the Jianwen Emperor to reduce the power of the imperial princes. Accused of plotting treason by one of his own sons, Zhu Su was stripped of his title and exiled again. After the Yongle Emperor seized the throne, he restored Zhu Su to his princely rank in 1403 but excluded him from state affairs. The prince then devoted himself to scientific and literary pursuits, using the resources of his princely estate to study botany and medicine. He authored the herbal treatise Jiuhuang bencao ("Famine Relief Herbal"), a pioneering work on edible wild plants, and compiled more than 60,000 medical prescriptions before his death in 1425.

== Biography ==
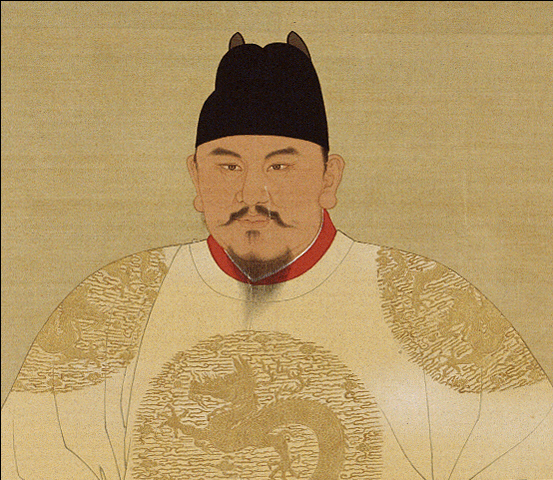
The Hongwu Emperor, father of Zhu Su, c. 1377

Zhu Su was born on 8 October 1361 as the fifth son of Zhu Yuanzhang and his primary wife, Lady Ma, according to official records. At the time, Zhu Yuanzhang was based in Nanjing and was a prominent rebel leader during the Red Turban Rebellion, an uprising in China against the Mongol-led Yuan dynasty. The rebellion sought to restore Han Chinese rule after decades of Mongol domination following the Yuan conquest of the Song in 1279. In 1368, Zhu Yuanzhang founded the Ming dynasty and became the Hongwu Emperor. In May 1370, the Emperor granted the titles of princes (王) to nine of his sons, including Zhu Su, who was created the Prince of Wu (吳王) with his fief at Hangzhou, a major city in the Jiangnan region. In 1374, however, the Hongwu Emperor refused to allow Zhu Su to take up residence in Hangzhou, arguing that the revenues of Jiangnan were vital to the central government and should remain under its direct control.

Zhu Su developed a close relationship with his older brother Zhu Di, despite their contrasting personalities. While Zhu Di was inclined toward military pursuits, Zhu Su preferred scholarly interests, later becoming an expert in botany and pharmacology. In 1376, he relocated to Fengyang in central China, where he engaged in military training with other princes. Two years later, his father changed his title to Prince of Zhou (周王) and arranged for him to marry the daughter of Feng Sheng, the military commander in Kaifeng, the capital of Henan. Upon reaching adulthood in 1381, Zhu Su moved to Kaifeng, where he held no official authority over the local administration, but his personal guard and large household, led by experienced advisors and officials, granted him significant influence. Alongside his father-in-law, Zhu Su oversaw the troops stationed in the province.

In 1389, Zhu Su secretly left Kaifeng for Fengyang to visit Feng Sheng, who had been condemned by the Emperor for his actions during a victorious battle against the Mongols in 1387. Zhu Su was banished to Yunnan in the southwest of the empire, but was actually held captive at the imperial court in Nanjing. His eldest son, Zhu Youdun, took over his household in Kaifeng and was officially named as his successor in 1391. Zhu Su was not permitted to return to Kaifeng until the end of 1391.

In 1398, the Hongwu Emperor died and was succeeded by his grandson, the Jianwen Emperor. The new government implemented a policy of "reducing the feudatories", and Zhu Su was the first victim of this new policy. In the autumn of 1398, the prince's second son, Zhu Youxun, accused his father of planning a rebellion. Zhu Su was then imprisoned, stripped of his title, and exiled to Yunnan. In August 1399, Zhu Di rebelled. After a three-year civil war, he defeated the Jianwen Emperor and took the throne as the Yongle Emperor. The new emperor permitted Zhu Su to return to Nanjing in 1402 and then to Kaifeng in 1403.

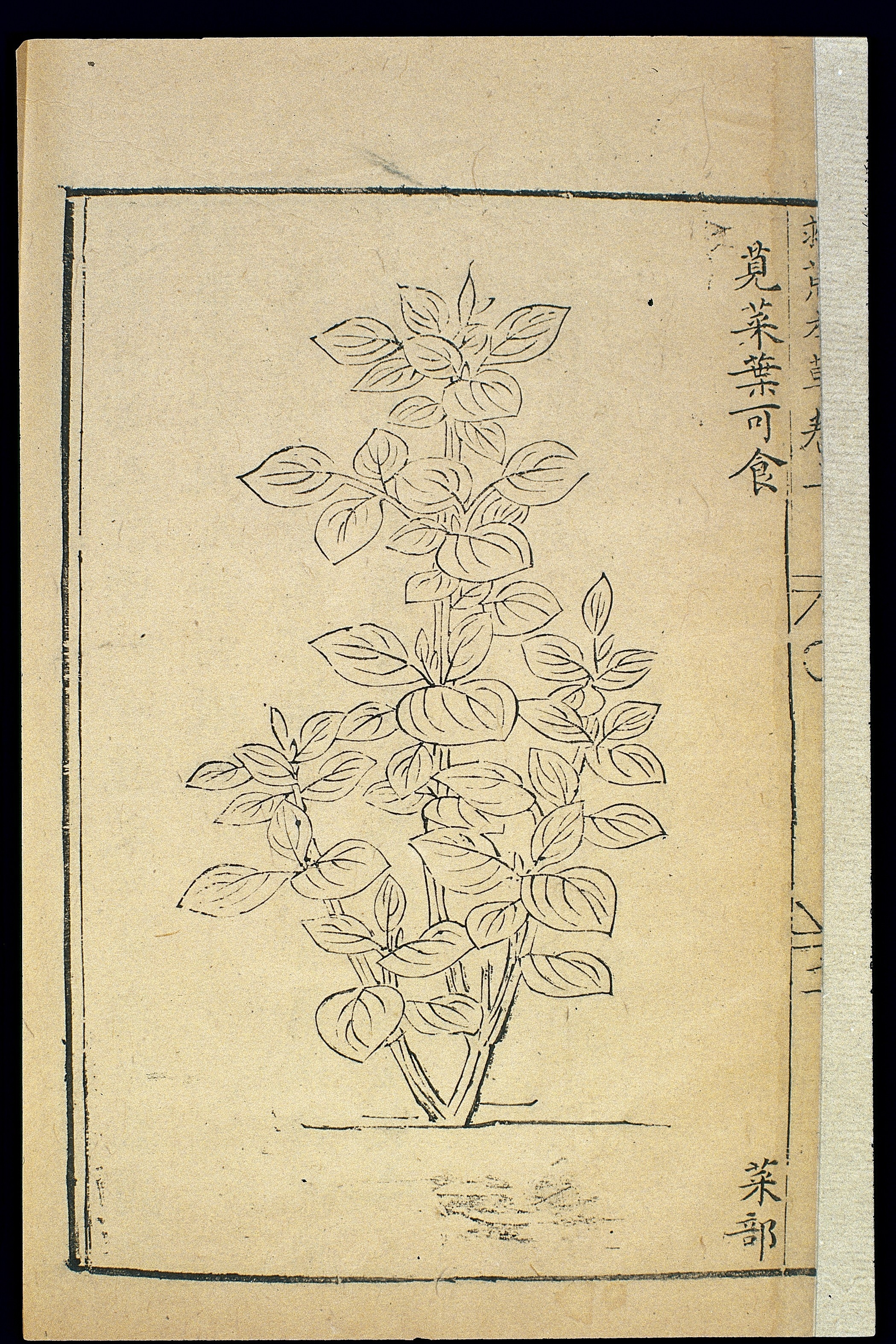
Illustration from the Jiuhuang bencao depicting edible amaranth (xiancai; Amaranthus mangostanus). 1593 edition.

Although the Yongle Emperor provided Zhu Su with double the usual princely stipend, transferred the revenues from trade taxes in Kaifeng to him, and bestowed high gifts, he kept his brother away from politics. Zhu Su therefore turned his attention to science. He devoted himself to the study of botany and medicine, and in 1406, he published a botanical monograph titled Jiuhuang bencao ("Famine Relief Herbal"), which described 414 edible wild plants. Most of these plants (276) were not mentioned in older herbals that focused solely on medicinal plants. The purpose of this book was to educate readers about edible plants that could be used in the event of crop failure and famine. He also published Puji fang ("Prescriptions for Common Benefit"), a collection of 61,739 medical prescriptions. Along with his writing, he was also a skilled calligrapher.

In 1420, Zhu Su was summoned to Nanjing on charges of plotting a rebellion. He confessed to his crimes and the Emperor pardoned him, but his personal guard was reduced to a minimum. Zhu Su died on 2 September 1425. His eldest son, Zhu Youdun, was a prolific playwright who wrote over thirty plays in the zaju genre. He succeeded his father as the new Prince of Zhou. Zhu Su had sixteen sons and at least ten daughters. His descendants held the title of Prince of Zhou until the mid-17th century. The last prince, Zhu Gongxiao, engaged in the defense of Kaifeng against rebel forces led by Li Zicheng in 1641, and in 1644, after the fall of the Ming, he fled south to serve the Ming pretender Zhu Yihai.

== Notes ==
Zhu Su House of Zhu Born: 8 October 1361 Died: 2 September 1425
Chinese royalty
New creation	Prince of Zhou; 1378–1425	Succeeded by Zhu Youdun
