= Jiuhuang bencao =

Ming dynasty Chinese botanical manual

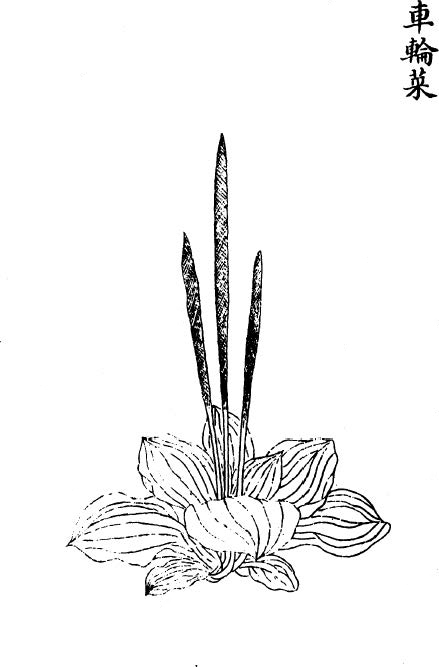
Cheluncai or plantain illustration from the 1778 Siku quanshu edition Jiuhuang bencao

The Jiuhuang bencao (Chinese: 救荒本草; pinyin: Jiùhuāng běncǎo; Wade–Giles: Chiu-huang pen-ts'ao; lit. 'Famine Relief Herbal'), compiled by the Ming dynasty prince Zhu Su (朱橚) and published in 1406, was the first illustrated botanical manual for famine foods—wild food plants suitable for survival during times of famine.

== Author ==
Prince Zhu Su (朱橚), was born in 1361 as the fifth son of the Hongwu Emperor (1328–1398), the founder of the Ming dynasty (1368–1644). Sources differ regarding whether the prince's given name was pronounced Xiao or Su. The uncommon Chinese character (橚) can be pronounced sù ("a tall tree"), xiāo ("flourishing vegetation"), or qiū as a phonetic loan character for qiū (楸, "Chinese catalpa").

Zhu received the title of Wuwang (吴王, "Prince of Wu") in 1370 and that of Zhouwang (周王, "Prince of Zhou") in 1378, and he was enfeofed with the district of Kaifeng, Henan, in 1381. In 1399, prince Zhu was banished to Yunnan, where he died in 1425 and received the posthumous name Zhou Dingwang (周定王, "Prince Ding of Zhou"), which is often cited as author of the Jiuhuang bencao.

Zhu Xiao was a talented scholar and wrote a collection of poetry called the Yuangong ci (元宮詞). He also wrote two compilations of medical prescriptions, the Shenzhenfang (神珍方, "Divine Authentic Prescriptions"), and the Puji fang (普濟方, "Prescriptions for Common Benefit"), which is frequently quoted in the Bencao gangmu. Zhu Xiao studied botany when he lived in Kaifeng, which is located on the flood plains of the Yellow River and has historically suffered from natural disasters.

Zhu Xiao wrote the Jiuhuang bencao from 1403 to 1406 after many years of careful research, presumably "in an effort to alleviate the sufferings and death that too frequently occur in China as a result of famine." According to tradition, Zhu Xiao researched and chose potential famine foods, had them planted in experimental gardens, which Christopher called "famine gardens," and commissioned scholars to observe and record the plants' developmental stages. For the woodblock-printed publication, Zhu had extremely true-to-life illustrations prepared to portray the respective famine plants. The German sinologist Emil Bretschneider praised the Jiuhuang bencao woodcuts as "tolerably true to nature" and "certainly superior to some European wood-cuts of the 17th century". The American botanist Walter T. Swingle says that in spite of their primitive technique, these woodcuts "are of high artistic quality."

== Title ==
The title combines jiùhuāng (救荒, lit. "help; rescue" and "wasteland; famine"), meaning "send relief to a famine area; help tide over a crop failure", and běncǎo (本草, lit. "root" and "plant"), which usually means "pharmacopoeia; materia medica" for texts about herbal medicines but means "herbal" for the Jiuhuang bencao about famine foods.

There is no regular English translation of Jiuhuang bencao, and it has been translated as:

- "Relieve Famine Herbal"
- "The Famine Herbal"
- "Treatise on Wild Food Plants for Use in Emergencies"
- "Materia Medica for Survival during Famines"
- "Plants for Disaster Relief Food"
- "Famine Relief Pharmacopoeia"
- "Materia Medica for the Relief of Famine"

== Editions ==
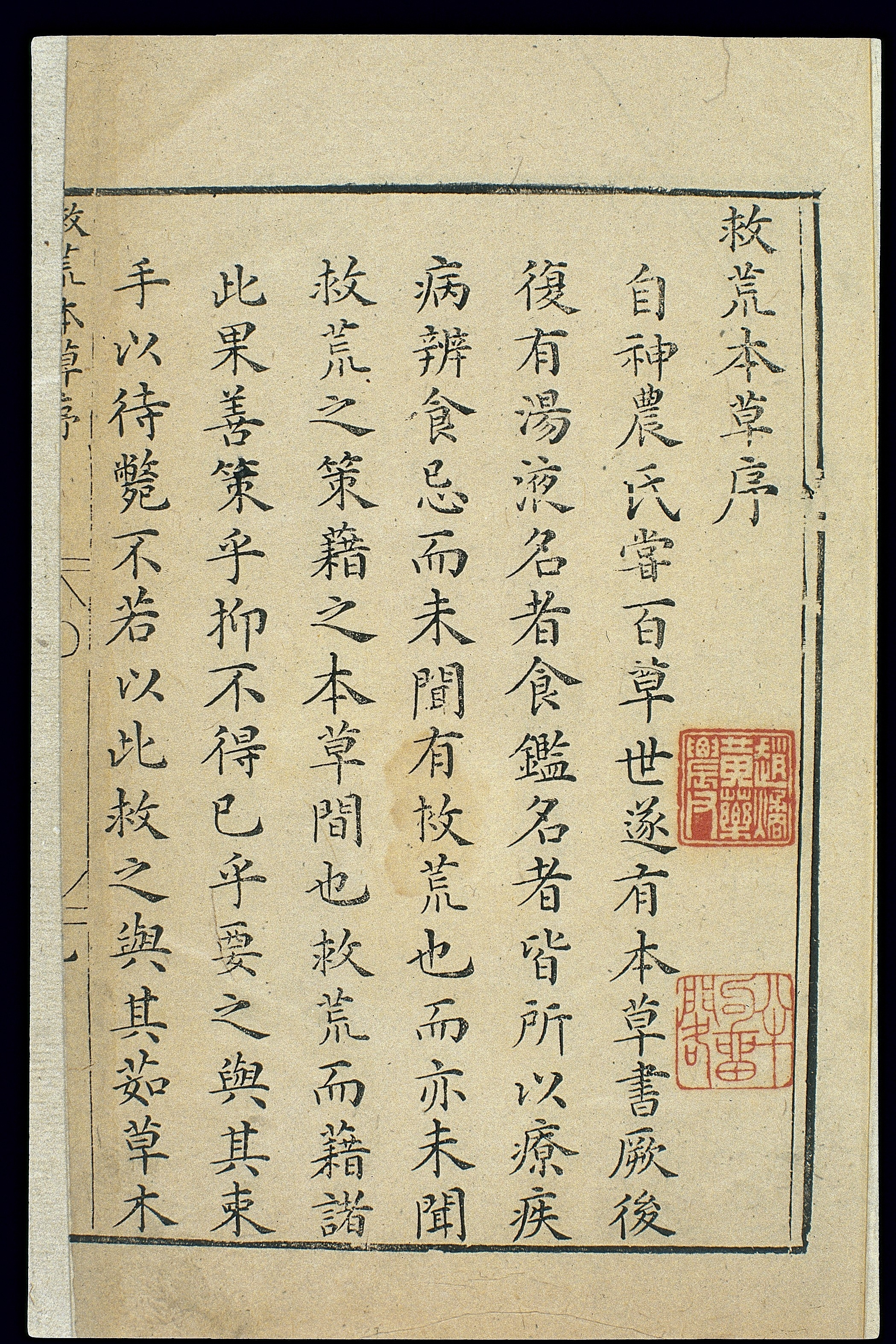
First page of preface of Jiuhuang bencao, from a 1593 edition

In 1406, Zhu Xiao published the first edition Jiuhuang bencao in Kaifeng, with a preface written by a scholar in the prince's household, Bian Tong (卞同), who explained:

The Prince of [Zhou] set up private nursery gardens ([pu] 圃) where he experimented with the planting and utilisation of more than four hundred kinds of plants, collected from fields, ditches and wildernesses. He himself followed their growth and development from the beginning to the end of their seasons. Engaging special artists ([huagong] 畫工) to make pictures of each of the plants and trees, he himself set down details of all the edible parts, whether flowers, fruits, roots, stems, bark or leaves, and digested the whole into a book with the title [Jiuhuang bencao]. He asked me, [Tong], to write a preface, which I have done very willingly. Human nature is such that in times when food and clothing is plentiful nobody takes a thought for those who are, or may be, freezing and starving; then when the day comes that they meet with this themselves, they have not the slightest idea what to do and can only wring their hands. Therefore he who would govern himself in order to govern the people should never lose sight of this for a single moment.

This original edition had two volumes, with four separately paginated parts. Beginning in the sixteenth century, many new and revised editions of the Jiuhuang bencao were published.

In 1525, Bi Mengzhai (畢蒙齋), the governor Shanxi, ordered a second edition; the physician Li Lian (李譧) wrote the preface and Lu Dong (陸東) engraved the woodblocks. Li's preface explains the reason Zhu Xiao wrote the book.

The climate and soil of the five regions (he said) is not at all the same, so the local plants are also quite different in form and quality. The names are numerous and complicated, and it is difficult to distinguish one from another, the true from the false. If one did not have illustrations and explanations people would confuse [shechuang (蛇床 "milk parsley")] with [miwu (靡蕪 "hemlock parsley")], or [chini (齊苨 "ladybell")] with [renshen (人參 "ginseng")]. Mistakes of this kind can kill people. This is why the [Jiuhuang bencao] was written, with its pictures and descriptions to clarify the forms of the plants and to record the methods of their use. In each case the writer first states where the plant grows, then be gives its synonyms and speaks of its Yang properties, whether refrigerant or calefacient, and its Yin sapidities, whether sweet or bitter; finally he says whether one must wash the part to be used (and for how long), soak it, fry it lightly, boil it, steam it, sun-dry it, and so on, with details of whatever method of seasoning is necessary.... If in time of famine people collect (emergency plants) in accordance with the resources of the local flora, there will be no difficulty and many lives will be saved.

In 1959, Zhonghua Book Company published a 4-volume photocopied version of the 2nd edition.

The third (1555) edition Jiuhuang bencao was printed in 4 volumes, one for each of the four original parts. It mistakenly identified the author as Zhu Xiao's son Zhou Xianwang (周憲王) or Zhu Youdun (朱有燉, 1379–1439). Li Shizhen's Bencao gangmu repeated this erroneous attribution to Zhou Xianwang.

Owing to frequent content revisions of the text, the number of chapters and plants in some editions no longer corresponded with the 1st-edition Jiuhuang bencao. In 1562, Hu Cheng (胡乘) reprinted the text in Sichuan, but he excluded nearly half of the original 414 plants. After the harsh 1565 famine, Zhu Kun of Baoshan, Yunnan paid to republish the original version in 1566, reprinted in 1586, but it only contained 411 plants. This 1586 edition is the oldest version preserved in China. In 1639, Hu Wenhuan (胡文焕) published Xu Guangqi's Nongzheng quanshu (農政全書) collection, reprinted the Jiuhuang bencao with 413 plants.

The first Japanese edition of the Jiuhuang bencao (Japanese Kikin honzō) was published in 1716. It was compiled and annotated by Matsuoka Jōan (松岡恕庵, 1668–1746), a famous Japanese herbalist.

In 1846, The French sinologist Stanislas Julien presented a copy of the Jiuhuang bencao to the French Academy of Sciences; and the Athenaeum (1846) said, "The Chinese government annually prints thousands [of this book], and distributes them gratuitously in those districts which are most exposed to natural calamities".

== Contents ==
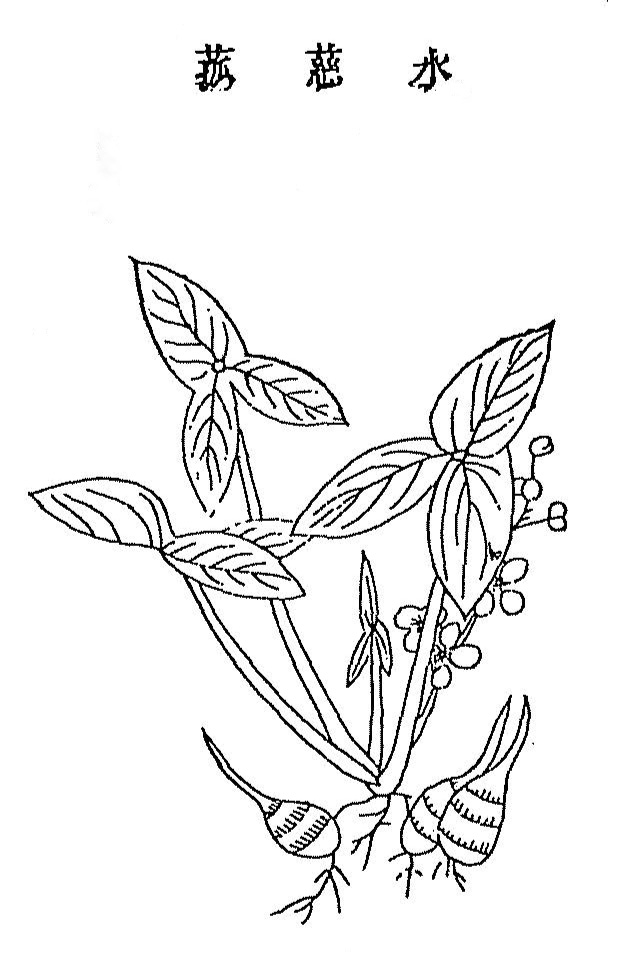
Shuicigu or arrowhead plant illustration from the 1639 Nongzheng quanshu edition of Jiuhuang bencao

The Jiuhuang bencao includes monographs on 414 famine plants, 138 that could function both as foods and drugs were from earlier texts like the Song dynasty Zhenglei bencao (證類本草, 1083), and 276 foods were new to Chinese pharmacopeias. Zhu Xiao arranged them in five classes, herbs 245 kinds, trees 80, cereals 20, fruits 23 and vegetables 46. There are 15 groups according to the part used; leaves 237 kinds, fruits 61, leaves and fruits 44, roots 28, roots and leaves 16, roots and fruits 5, roots and shoots 3, roots and flowers 2, leaves barks and fruits 2, stems 3, shoots and fruit 1.

According to Read, at least 73 of Zhu Xiao's new food plants entered Chinese domesticated horticulture (e.g., taro, water-chestnut, bamboo shoot) and 16 more were adopted in the diet of Japan or Europe (watercress, wasabi, burdock).

The Jiuhuang bencao entry for Sagittaria sagittifolia "arrowhead" exemplifies famine food plants that were first described by Zhu Xiao and later became normal Chinese crop plants. In the present day, this edible tuber, traditionally associated with Chinese New Year, is known as cígū ((慈菇, lit. "kindly mushroom"), also written 慈姑 ("kindly aunt") or 茨菰 ("thatch wild-rice")), jiǎndāocǎo (剪刀草, "scissors herb"), or yànwěicǎo (燕尾草, "swallow tail herb"). Zhu Xiao used the names shuǐcígū (水慈菰, "water kindly wild-rice"), using gū (菰, "wild rice") instead of gū (菇, "mushroom"), jiǎndāocǎo, and jiàndācǎo (箭搭草, "arrow hang herb").

[Shuicigu] The common name for this is scissors herb [jiandaocao] or else [jiandacao] (hung-up arrows herb). It grows in water, the item is grooved on one side (wā [窊]) and squarish on the other, with stringy fibres. The leaves are three-horned, resembling indeed a pair of scissors. From amidst the leaf-stalks rise up scapes which fork and bear three-petalled white flowers with yellow centres. Each of these gives a blue-green fruit follicle ([gūtū 蓇葖]) like that of the [qīngchǔtáo 青楮桃 "paper mulberry"] but rather smaller. The (tuberous) root is of the same kind as that of the onion ([cōng 葱]) but coarser and larger and of a sweet taste. In case of hunger collect the young and tender shoots near the (tuberous) roots and scald them, then add oil and salt, and eat.

Needham remarks on the high degree of precision in 14th-century Chinese phytographic language (gūtū 蓇葖 for "fruit follicle" generally – Sagittaria has many carpels – rather than the modern specification of "one-carpelled unilocular ovary"). Both Read and Needham note it is curious that Xu Xiao only recommended the shoots or turions for food, and not the starchy corms as a whole.

Information in the ancient Jiuhuang bencao is not always reliable. For instance, the shānlídòu (山黧豆, "mountain dark bean") "Lathyrus palustris; grass pea; marsh pea" entry says, "ln time of famine collect the (young) pods and boil them, or boil the peas themselves to eat, or (dry them and) grind to flour and use like ordinary pea (flour)." However, Zhu Xiao did not warn that exclusively eating poisonous marsh peas (as during a famine) can result in lathyrism "a neurological disease causing paralysis of the legs".

== Esculentist Movement ==
The Jiuhuang bencao originated what Joseph Needham called the "Esculentist Movement"—from the word esculent "edible; comestible"—of medieval Chinese botanical research into wild food plants safe to eat in an emergency. While this Ming dynasty movement only lasted from the late-14th century to the middle-17th century, Needham says it "gave rise to some veritable monuments and masterpieces of applied botany." Notable examples include

- (1524) Yecai pu (野菜譜, "Treatise on Wild Vegetables"), Wang Pan (王槃), 60 plants; reprinted as Jiuihuang yepu (救荒野譜 "Relieve Famine Wild [Vegetable] Treatise"), and supplemented by the (c. 1630) Jiuhuang yepu buyi (救荒野譜補遺)
- (c. 1550), Shiwu bencao (食物本草, "Food Herbal"), Lu He (盧和), Wang Ling (汪穎), 400
- (1591) Yinzhuan fushi jian (飲饌服食箋 "Explanations of Diet and Nutrition"), Gao Lian 高濂, 164
- (1597) Rucao pian (茹草篇, "Book of Edible Herbs"), Zhou Lüjing (周履靖), 105
- (1622) Yecai bolu (野菜博錄, "Encyclopedia of Wild Vegetables"), Bao Shan (鮑山) 438
- (1642) Jiuhuang yepu (救荒野譜, "Treatise on Survival in the Wilderness and During Famine"), Yao Kecheng's (姚可成) Shiwu bencao (食物本草, "Materia Medica of Nutrition"), 120 plants

Each of these texts contained some plants not included in the Jiuhuang bencao, the identification of which has not received much attention by modern botanists. Bretschneider's study botanically identified 176 of the 414 Jiuhuang bencao plants; Read identified 358, leaving 56 unrevealed plants. Read's monograph notably includes annotated modern data on the chemical composition and nutritive value of some of the plants.

Joseph Needham concluded, "There can be no doubt that the esculentist movement constituted one of the great Chinese humanitarian contributions. We do not know of any parallel in European, Arabic or Indian medieval civilisation." The first similar work in a European language was Charles Bryant's (1783) Flora Diaetetica, or History of Esculent Plants, both Domestic and Foreign.

== Evaluation ==
The comparatively few Western scholars who have analyzed the Jiuhuang bencao have enthusiastically praised prince Zhu Xiao's 700-year-old famine herbal.

Bretschneider said the text "is not a simple compilation from earlier treatises, but for the greater part an original work based upon the author's own experience." Swingle described it as "a valuable early treatise on Chinese botany", and the "earliest known, and still today the best" work on famine food plants." The Belgian-American historian of science George Sarton called it "the most remarkable herbal of medieval times". said that looking back at the work of Zhu Xiao, "one is struck by an impression of great originality. Certainly no previous work of a similar kind has come down to us." The American anthropologist Robert L. Freedman (2008) said the Jiuhuang bencao is the "most well-known, and comprehensive study of famine food plants."

== See also ==
- Bigu (avoiding grains) – Daoist dietary techniques employing some famine foods
- Caigentan ("Vegetable Root Discourse") – a 1590 compilation of aphorisms
