= Qu (poetry) =

Classical Chinese poetry form

The Qu form of poetry is a type of Classical Chinese poetry form, consisting of words written in one of a number of certain, set tone patterns, based upon the tunes of various songs. Thus Qu poems are lyrics with lines of varying longer and shorter lengths, set according to the certain and specific, fixed patterns of rhyme and tone of conventional musical pieces upon which they are based and after which these matched variations in lyrics (or individual Qu poems) generally take their name. The fixed-tone type of verse such as the Qu and the ci together with the shi and fu forms of poetry comprise the three main forms of Classical Chinese poetry.

== Names and types ==
In Chinese literature, the Qu (Chinese: 曲; pinyin: qǔ; Wade–Giles: ch'ü) form of poetry from the Yuan Dynasty may be called 元曲 (Yuánqǔ; Yüan-ch'ü). Qu may be derived from Chinese opera, such as the Zaju (雜劇), in which case these Qu may be referred to as sanqu (散曲).

== Sanqu ==
The San in Sanqu refers to the detached status of the Qu lyrics of this verse form: in other words, rather than being embedded as part of an opera performance the lyrics stand separately on their own. Since the Qu became popular during the late Southern Song Dynasty, and reached a special height of popularity in the poetry of the Yuan Dynasty, therefore it is often called Yuanqu (元曲), specifying the type of Qu found in Chinese opera typical of the Yuan Dynasty era. Both Sanqu and Ci are lyrics written to fit a different melodies, but Sanqu differs from Ci in that it is more colloquial, and is allowed to contain Chenzi (襯字; "filler words (which are additional words to make a more complete meaning)"). Sanqu can be further divided into Xiaoling (小令) and Santao (散套), with the latter containing more than one melody.

== See also ==
- Chinese Sanqu poetry
- Classical Chinese poetry forms
- Ci (poetry)
- Mandarin Chinese
- Melisma
- Song poetry
- Yuan poetry

== Notes and references ==
- Yip, Wai-lim (1997). Chinese Poetry: An Anthology of Major Modes and Genres . (Durham and London: Duke University Press). ISBN 0-8223-1946-2
