= Bai Renfu =

Chinese playwright of the Yuan dynasty

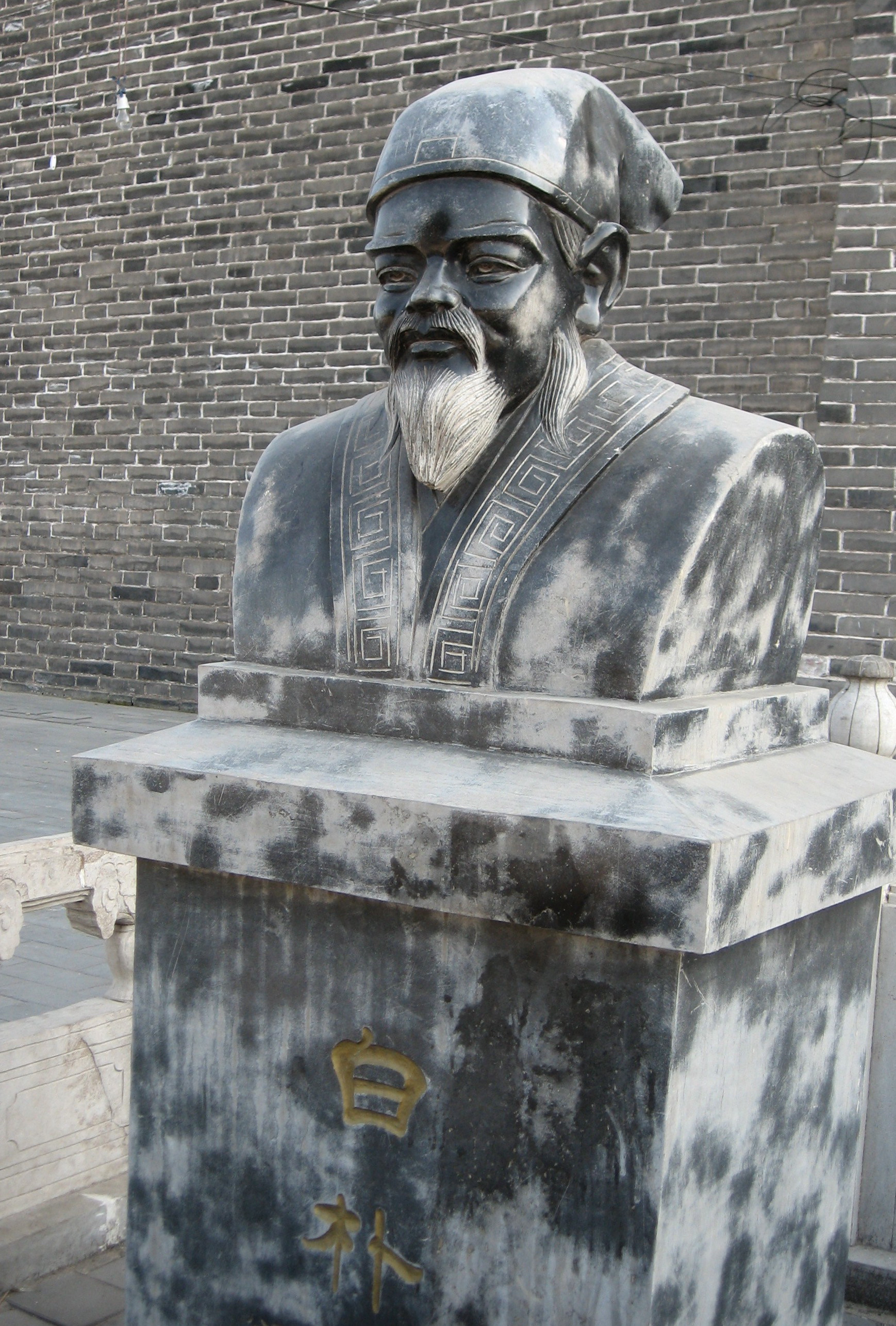
A statue of Bai Renfu in Zhengding

Bai Renfu (Chinese: 白仁甫; pinyin: Bái Rénfǔ; Wade–Giles: Pai Jen-fu or Po Jen-fu, c. 1226−1306), also known as Bai Pu (Chinese: 白朴; pinyin: Bái Pǔ; Wade–Giles: Pai P'u or Po P'u), was a Chinese playwright of the Yuan dynasty.

He wrote 16 plays, three of which are extant:

- Over the Wall (裴少俊牆頭馬上 Péi Shǎo Jùn Qiáng Tóu Mǎ Shàng)
- Rain on the Paulownia Tree (唐明皇秋夜梧桐雨 Táng Míng Huáng Qiū Yè Wú Tóng Yǔ) about Emperor Xuanzong and Lady Yang Guifei:
- Romance of the East Wall (董秀英花月東牆記 Dǒng Xiù Yīng Huā Yuè Dōng Qiáng Jì)

== Biography ==
A scion of an important Jin dynasty family, Bai Renfu's grandfather held a post at the powerful Bureau of Military Affairs, and his father was a close friend of the poet Yuan Haowen. However, the defeat of the Jin dynasty by the Mongol Empire resulted in a major upheaval in social relationships. Nevertheless, Bo Renfu achieved honorary rank and an official position in the Yuan dynasty as Minister of Protocol.

== See also ==
- Zaju
