= Sanqu =

Classical Chinese poetry form

Chinese name
- Chinese: 散曲
- Literal meaning: "Literary song"
Transcriptions
Standard Mandarin
- Hanyu Pinyin: sǎnqǔ
- Wade–Giles: san^{3}-ch’ü^{3}
- IPA: [sàntɕʰù]
Yue: Cantonese
- Yale Romanization: sáankūk
- Jyutping: saan2 kuk1

Japanese name
- Kanji: 散曲
- Hiragana: さんきょく
Transcriptions
- Romanization: sankyoku

Sanqu (Chinese: 散曲; pinyin: Sǎnqǔ; Wade–Giles: San-ch’ü) is a fixed-rhythm form of Classical Chinese poetry or "literary song". Specifically sanqu is a subtype of the qu formal type of poetry. Sanqu was a notable Chinese poetic form, possibly beginning in the Jin dynasty (1115–1234), but especially associated with the Yuan (1271–1368), Ming (1368–1644) and Qing (1644–1912) dynasties. The tonal patterns modeled on tunes drawn from folk songs or other music.

== Overview ==
The sanqu were literary lyrics directly related to the zaju arias: these were dramatic lyrics written to fixed musical modes or metrical forms and could contain several aria or lyric song segments in one suite. Sanqu, however, could be composed in single discrete sections. It is often said that the sanqu verses tend to reflect excess energies and resentments of contemporary disenfranchised Chinese literati, due to contemporary Jurchen and Mongol political domination. Often the poetry could be humorous as is the following anonymous lyric:

The seams have come unstitched,
All falling apart, the leather is ruined.
Money wasted several times fixing them.
I haven’t repaid
The money used to buy them.
I dare not swagger,
But only take half-steps;
Fearing stones like wolves’ teeth,
Stairs like turtles’ backs.
Climbing the lookout
I veer left and right.
I dare not use the shoe stretcher;
At best I can hang them out in the sun.

— Anonymous, "Wearing Ruined Boots"

There were many forms of Sanqu during the Yuan Dynasty. These included a kind of opera (or acting and singing), dance accompaniment and instrumental accompaniment. During feasts, actors would hold lotus flowers in their left hands and, holding their goblets in the right, would sing a song of the heavy rains hitting the lotus flowers.

Both sanqu dramatic lyrics and plays enjoyed the same social milieu; for example, esteemed playwrights like Ma Zhiyuan (c. 1270-1330) and Guan Hanqing (c. 1300) were also well established writers of sanqu. This poetry was strongly influenced by the linguistics of vernacular or semi-vernacular Classical Chinese. In terms of historical transmission to modern times, textual problems abound and, this has perhaps contributed to the paucity of translations of a truly significant Chinese literary genre that expanded the limits of literary expression. The collection and printing of sanqu poetry is ongoing. Recently a Ming period collection has seen a modern edition.

== See also ==
- Classical Chinese poetry forms
- Mandarin Chinese
- Ming poetry
- Yuan poetry
- Zhongyuan Yinyun

== Books ==
- Crump, James I, Songs from Xanadu, Ann Arbor, 1983.
- Lynn, Richard John and Bailey Roger B. Guide to Chinese Poetry and Drama, G.K.Hall, 1973.
- Nienhauser, William H. The Indiana Companion to Chinese Literature, Indiana University Press, 1986.
- Tan, Tian Yuan. Songs of Contentment and Transgression: Discharged Officials and Literati Communities in Sixteenth-Century North China, Harvard University Asia Center, 2010. ISBN 9780674056046.

== Translations ==
- Carpenter, Bruce E. "Chinese San-ch’ü Poetry of the Mongol Era: I", Tezukayama Daigaku kiyo (Journal of Tezukayama University), Nara, Japan, no. 22, pp. 27–72.
- Carpenter, Bruce E. "Chinese San-ch’ü Poetry of the Mongol Era: II", Tezukayama Daigaku kiyo (Journal of Tezukayama University), Nara, Japan, no. 23, pp. 31–76.
