= Zaju =

Genre of Chinese opera

- Traditional Chinese: 雜劇
- Simplified Chinese: 杂剧
- Literal meaning: Variety drama
Transcriptions
Standard Mandarin
- Hanyu Pinyin: zájù
- Wade–Giles: tsa^{2}-chü^{4}
- IPA: [tsǎ.tɕû]

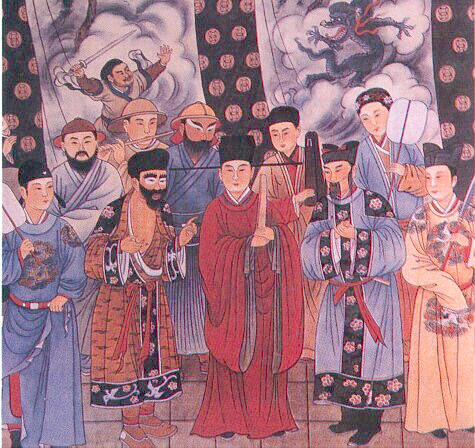
A modern reconstruction of a mural depicting the Yuan zaju stage c. 1324. The original was found in the Guangsheng Temple of Shanxi province.

Zaju was a form of Chinese opera which provided entertainment through a synthesis of recitations of prose and poetry, dance, singing, and mime, with a certain emphasis on comedy (or, happy endings). Although with diverse and earlier roots, zaju has particularly been associated with the time of the Yuan dynasty (1271–1368), and zaju remains important in terms of the historical study of the theater arts as well as Classical Chinese literature and poetry. Zaju is known to have been performed during the earlier Song (960–1279) and Jin (1115–1234) dynasties. The various particulars of the zaju multimedia performance were derived from many and diverse sources of musical, dance, poetry, and theater traditions.

== Characteristics ==
The Yuan zaju were poetic music dramas comprising four acts, with the "act" (齣, chu) defined as a set of songs following and completing a certain musical modal progression. Occasionally one or two "wedges" (楔子, xiezi), or short interludes in the form of an aria performed by another character might be added to either support or enhance the plot. Within the acts, lyrics were written to accompany existing tunes or set-rhythmic patterns; and, the major singing roles were restricted to one star per act. The zaju featured particular specialized roles for performers, such as dan (female), sheng (male), hua (花, painted-face) and chou (clown). In addition to these main roles there were also a collection of side roles known as 'waijiao' (extra roles) and these consisted of: the jiatou (emperor), the beauty pining in her boudoir, the bawd, the coquettish young girl, the high official, the poor, the brigand, the government servant and those categories concerning immortals and Taoist deliverance, and family matters.

== Background ==
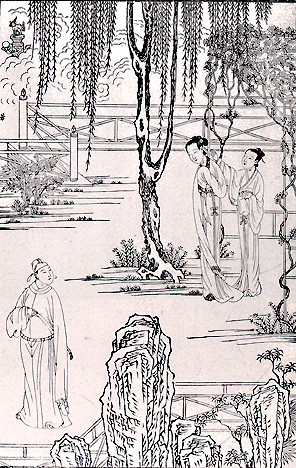
From a print illustration of zaju plays by Yuan writers; Ming dynasty, Wanli reign (1572–1620).

On one hand, the zaju theater is the product of a long process of Chinese art, music, and poetry; on the other hand, the zaju also appears as a phenomenon resulting from a combination of cultures of Eurasia over time. Zaju had its genesis even before the Yuan dynasty (1271–1368). Zaju was verified as a variety play in North China in the course of the Northern Song dynasty. Zaju was performed during the Song dynasty (960–1279), particularly the Northern Song period (960–1127), as well as the Jurchen Jin dynasty (1115–1234), which succeeded it in northern China.

Zaju is now best known now from its high development during the Yuan dynasty, which was founded by the Mongol Empire under the leadership of Kublai Khan. Significant surviving literature exists from this period, including around two-hundred written scripts for zaju performances. Although the Yuan was the first non-Han dynasty to rule over China fully, varying ethno-musico influences had already made an effect upon the culture of China, most relevantly in terms of the mix of arts that went on to coalesce as the mixed zaju ("variety theater"): this encompassed poetry, gymnastics, orchestral music, set design, along with the other arts required for this complex form of theater art. Major questions remain about the relationships between this artistic and political process in regards to how it is known in relationship to the zaju form of art. The Yuan succeeded the previous dynasties which controlled parts of China: the Jurchen Jin dynasty, the Tangut Western Xia (1038–1227), and the Han Song dynasty. The transitions between the various political regimes tended to involve war, death, and disorder in a large scale. However, various cultural and artistic contributions from these diverse sources melded together to help form the zaju performances: musical modes of the steppes, traditional Chinese shi and ci poetry, the newly developed and embedded qu lyrics, acrobatics, and dance, combined with the other varieties of artistic performance to contribute to the mix which zaju represents. Accompanying musical notation is evidently lacking; instead, the tune to which an aria was meant to be sung is indicated in the text by the title of a popular song or aria using the same tune. Generally, information about performances derives from preserved literary texts: arias, libretti, and/or other forms of stage direction.

== Playwrights ==
Much of the information on Yuan era plays (that is, "operas") and playwrights derives from a book written during this time period which is entitled Register of Ghosts. Famous playwrights (that is, authors of zaju) include:

- Guan Hanqing, author of The Injustice to Dou E
- Bo Renfu, author of Rain on the Paulownia Tree, a story on Emperor Xuanzong of Tang and his lady Yang Guifei
- Ma Zhiyuan, author of Autumn in Han Palace and six other extant zaju plays
- Zheng Guangzu, author of The Departed Soul of a Beautiful Maiden
- Wang Shifu, who wrote the popular play Romance of the Western Chamber
- Li Qianfu, who wrote Circle of Chalk
- Yuan Zuguang, who wrote several plays, including Frowning Landlord and The Heavenly Music, which reflected elements of the Wuxu Reform.

== Performance ==
Zaju drama was performed by four to five actors. There were three parts in the performance of Zaju drama; first part (Yanduan) was the introduction, the second part was the stories were being told -- it is considered the main play as it carries the content of the show; the third part (Sanduan) was always a humorous ending. Each character had restricted singing roles as it will be a lot easier for the performance to flow accordingly. Acts were also given distinct rhymes but the melodies were given to those of the Beijing region.

In contrast to Elizabethan theater where Males would cross-dress as females during plays due to only male actors being allowed on stage, in Zaju and other Yuan drama, cross-dressing was very common, the majority of performers for Zaju were actually female and they would play a variety of male roles on the stage such as the jiatou or a 'soft' male lead.

== Legacy ==
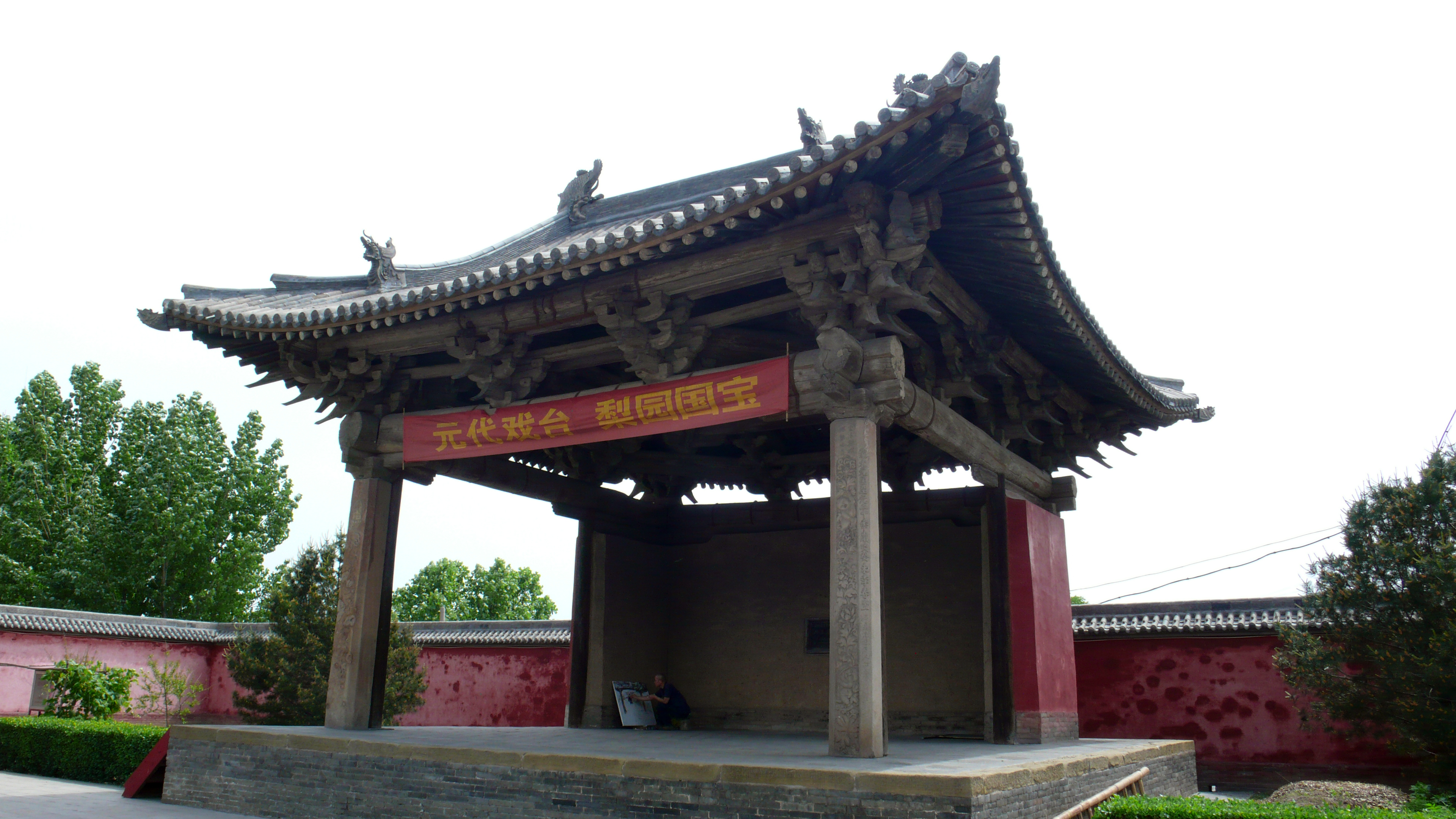
A Yuan-period opera stage near Niuwang Temple (牛王廟), Yaodu District, Linfen, Shanxi.

Zaju represents a period in the development of the Chinese Opera. In terms of the history of theatrical performance, the zaju's contributions to Chinese theater include the received legacies from previous forms of theatrical performance, the transformations based on the influence of these, and the legacy which the zaju performances in passed on to future performers and performances. On a more purely literary level, much of the poetry of the Yuan period is in the form of the qu poetry verse, which basically became an independent form of art, removed from its original theatrical and orchestral context: written after the model of the cadences, or set tone patterns, known from the arias of the zaju theater, the Chinese Sanqu poetry eventually became a separate tradition, in the category of poetic literature, rather than in the category of the performing arts. During the Yuan dynasty the prestige of both theater and of the use of vernacular language in art and literature were probably related to the fact that the new Mongol dominated regime less understood the older, classical language and forms. Rather, the new Mongol elite appreciated the theater and the use of vernacular language. Compared to the traditional Chinese shì, or scholar-officials or emperors, the newcomers were not so literately erudite or oriented, much less were they appreciative of the ancient forms, expressions, and allusions, legacy of more than a millennium. Zaju took much of its characteristics from both this emphasis on the vernacular speech, as well as the lowered prestige of traditional scholarly literature. Also, founding emperor Kublai Khan suspended the traditional civil service tests, which emphasized learning of the ancient classical tradition, thus both lowering the prestige of this course of learning and also reducing the opportunities for scholar-officials to engage in traditional career paths. This resulted in opportunities for aspiring playwrights to write for zaju, both for those playwrights relatively new to literature and for those members of the traditional shi class who could no longer succeed as poets and essayists, and were willing to embrace the zaju. During the Ming era a subset of zaju were coined as 'jiatou zaju' which were any zaju play that contained the waijiao; jiatou or jia which referred to the emperor role, which during these times the jiatou zaju were outlawed and any impersonation of the emperor on stage was prohibited. This prohibition of the jiatou zaju extended beyond just the role of the emperor but also king, empress, concubine or even a loyal minister, anyone who violated this mandate of the Ming era was to be caned one hundred times, not only that but any official or household that allowed these roles to be performed receive the same disciplinary action. The long-term legacy of the zaju theater was thus not only regarding the development of Chinese opera over subsequent centuries into the present day; but, also, despite the ensuing Ming dynasty restoration of prestige to legacy literary forms, the zaju form contributed to the increased prestige and popularity of vernacular forms such as the novel which ensued in the Ming dynasty literature.

== See also ==
- Chinese variety art
- Classical Chinese poetry
- Culture of the Song Dynasty
- The Injustice to Dou E
- Qu (poetry)
- Theatre of China
- Yuan drama
- Yuan poetry
