= List of writers by name: W =

The following is a List of writers by name whose last names begin with W:

Abbreviations: ch = children's, d = drama, f = fiction, nf = non-fiction, p = poetry, song lyrics

== Wa ==
- Theippan Maung Wa (1899–1942, Burma, f/nf)
- Alex de Waal (born 1963, England, nf)
- Edmund de Waal (born 1964, England, nf)
- Simon de Waal (born 1961, Netherlands, f/nf)
- Victor de Waal (born 1929, Netherlands/England, nf)
- Bernard Waber (1921–2013, US, ch)
- Abdourahman Waberi (born 1965, Djibouti/US, f/nf/p)
- Wace (c. 1110 – c. 1174, Jersey, p)
- Henry Wace (1836–1924, England, nf)
- Muriel Wace (1881–1968, England, ch), pseudonym Golden Gorse
- Charity Waciuma (born 1936, Kenya, f/ch)
- Wilhelm Heinrich Wackenroder (1773–1798, Germany, nf)
- Tad Waddington (born 1962, US, nf)
- Sidney Wade (born 1951, US, p/nf)
- Ole Wæver (born 1960, Denmark, nf)
- Nora Wagener (born 1989, Luxembourg, f/ch/d)
- Angel Wagenstein (1922–2023, Bulgaria, d/f)
- Narayan Wagle (born 1968, Nepal, nf/f)
- Eberhard Wagner (born 1938, Germany)
- Elin Wägner (1882–1949, Sweden, f/nf)
- Heinrich Leopold Wagner (1747–1779, Germany, d)
- Jan Costin Wagner (born 1972, Germany/Finland, f)
- Richard Wagner (1952–2023, Germany, p/f/nf)
- Roland C. Wagner (1960–2012, France, f)
- Shaista Wahab (living, Afghanistan, nf)
- Per Wahlöö (1926–1975, Sweden, f)
- Wilhelm Waiblinger (1804–1830, Germany/Italy, p)
- John Wain (1925–1994, England, n/p/nf)
- Binyavanga Wainaina (1971–2019, Kenya, nf)
- Hilary Wainwright (born 1949, England, nf)
- Milton Wainwright (born 1950, England, nf)
- Lea Wait (born 1946, US, f/nf/ch)
- A. E. Waite (1857–1942, US/England, nf)
- Judy Waite (living, England, ch)
- Bokusui Wakayama (若山牧水, 1885–1928, Japan, p)
- Joan Wake (1884–1974, England, nf)
- H. Russell Wakefield (1888–1964, England, f)
- Mary Wakefield (born 1975, England, nf)
- Priscilla Wakefield (1751–1832, England, nf/ch)
- Thomas Wakley (1795–1862, England, nf)
- Mohammad Amin Wakman (born 1939, Afghanistan/India, nf)
- Diane Wakoski (born 1937, US, p/nf)
- Walafrid Strabo (c. 808–849, Germany, nf/p)
- Derek Walcott (1930–2017, Saint Lucia/US, p/d)
- Roderick Walcott (1930–2000, Saint Lucia/Canada, d/p)
- Max Waldau (1825–1855, Germany, p/f), pseudonym of Richard Georg Spiller von Hauenschild
- Eva Waldemarsson (1903–1986, Sweden, f)
- Herwarth Walden (1879–1941, Germany/Soviet Union, nf), pseudonym of Georg Lewin
- Chaim Walder (born 1969, Israel, nf/ch)
- Anne Waldman (born 1945, US, p)
- Steven D. Waldman (born 1951, US, nf)
- George Waldron (1690 – c. 1730, England/Isle of Man, p/nf)
- Howard Waldrop (born 1946, US, f)
- Rosmarie Waldrop (born 1935, Germany/US, p/f/nf)
- Arthur Waley (1889–1966, England, nf/p)
- Christian Walford (1907–1985, England, f), pseudonym of Norrey Ford Dilcock
- Alf Kjetil Walgermo (born 1977, Norway, nf)
- Alice Walker (born 1944, US, f/p)
- Annie Louisa Walker (1836–1907, England/Canada, f/p/nf)
- Barbara G. Walker (born 1930, US, nf)
- Elizabeth Walker (1623–1690, England, nf)
- Elizabeth Neff Walker (living, US, f)
- George Walker (1772–1847, England, f/nf/ch)
- John Walker (1759–1830, England, nf)
- Lucy Walker (1907–1987, Australia, f)
- Margaret Walker (1915–1998, US, p/f)
- Rob Walker (born 1953, Australia, p)
- Rosa Kershaw Walker (1840s–1909, US, nf)
- Annie Russell Wall (1835–1920, US, nf)
- Dorothy Wall (1894–1942, N Zealand/Australia, ch)
- Bronwen Wallace (1945–1989, Canada, p/f)
- David Foster Wallace (1962–2008, US, f/nf)
- Doreen Wallace (1897–1979, England, f/nf)
- Edgar Wallace (1875–1932, England/US, f/p/nf)
- Ian Wallace (1912–1998, US, f), pseudonym of John Wallace Pritchard
- Irving Wallace (1916–1990, US, f/d)
- Ivy Wallace (1915–2006, England/Scotland, ch)
- John Graham Wallace (born 1966, England, ch)
- Lew Wallace (1827–1905, US, f/nf)
- Louise Wallace (born 1959, N Zealand, nf)
- Louise Wallace (born 1983, N Zealand, p)
- Nick Wallace (born 1972, England, f)
- Pamela Wallace (born 1949, US, d/f)
- Chris Wallace-Crabbe (1934–2025, Australia, p/f/nf)
- David Wallace-Wells (born 1982, US, nf)
- Graham Wallas (1858–1932, England, nf)
- Edmund Waller (1606–1687, England, p)
- David Walliams (born 1971, England, ch/nf), pseudonym of David Edward Williams
- John Wallis (1616–1703, England, nf)
- Syed Waliullah (1922–1971, India/France, f/d)
- Leo Walmsley (1892–1966, England, f/nf)
- Horace Walpole (1717–1797, England, nf/f)
- Hugh Walpole (1884–1941, England, f)
- Neale Donald Walsch (born 1943, US, nf)
- Gerard Walschap (1898–1989, Belgium, p/f)
- Martin Walser (1927–2023, Germany, f/nf)
- Robert Walser (1878–1956, Switzerland, p/nf/f)
- Jill Paton Walsh (1937–2020, England, f/ch)
- María Elena Walsh (1930–2011, Argentina, p)
- Maurice Walsh (1879–1964, Ireland, f)
- Rodolfo Walsh (1927–1977, Argentina, nf/d)
- Sheila Walsh (1928–2009, England, f), pseudonym of Sheila O'Nions Walsh
- Vivian Walsh (living, US, ch)
- Minnie Gow Walsworth (1859–1947, US, p)
- Mika Waltari (1908–1979, Finland, f/p/nf)
- Mildred Pitts Walter (1922–2026, US, ch/nf)
- Otto F. Walter (1928–1994, Switzerland, f/nf/d)
- Silja Walter (1919–2011, Switzerland, f/nf)
- Guy Walters (born 1971, England, nf)
- Minette Walters (born 1949, England, f)
- Vanessa Walters (born 1978, England, f/d)
- Walther von der Vogelweide (c. 1170 – c. 1230, Germany/Austria, p)
- Amy Catherine Walton (1849–1939, England, ch)
- Brian Walton (1600–1661, England, nf)
- Jo Walton (born 1964, Wales/Canada, f)
- Ania Walwicz (1951–2020, Poland/Australia, p/d/nf)
- Koigi wa Wamwere (born 1949, Kenya, nf)
- Wan Shenzi (萬慎子, 1856–1923, China, p)
- Maxie Wander (1933–1977, Austria/Germany, f)
- Connie Wanek (born 1952, US, p/nf)
- Wang Anshi (王安石, 1021–1086, China, p/nf)
- Wang Anyi (王安憶, born 1954, China, f/nf)
- Wang Bi (王弼, 226–249 CE, China, nf)
- Wang Bo (王勃, 650–676, China/Jiaozhi, p)
- Wang Changling (王昌齡, 698–756, China, p)
- Wang Chong (王充, 27– c. 97 CE, China, nf)
- Wang Chongyang (王重阳, 1113–1170, China, nf/p)
- Wang Fanzhi (王梵志, fl. 7th c. CE, China, p)
- Wang Fuzhi (王夫之, 1619–1692, China, nf)
- Wang Guowei (王國維, 1877–1927, China, nf/p)
- Hao Wang (王浩, 1921–1995, China, nf)
- Wang Huo (王火, 1924–2025, China, f/d)
- Wang Lixiong (王力雄, born 1953, China, f/nf)
- Wang Qinghui (王清惠, 1264–1288, China, p)
- Wang Ruoshui (王若水, 1926–2002, China, nf)
- Wang Shifu (王实甫, 1250 – c. 1337, China, d)
- Wang Shuo (王朔, born 1958, China, f/d)
- Wang Wei (王維, 699–759, China, p)
- Wang Wei (王微, 1597–1647, China, p)
- Wang Xizhi (王羲之, 303–361, China, nf)
- Wang Xianzhi (王献之, 344–386, China, nf)
- Wang Xiaobo (王小波, 1952–1997, China, f/nf)
- Wang Xufeng (王旭烽, born 1955, China, nf)
- Wang Yangming (王陽明, 1472–1529, China, nf)
- Wang Yiting (王一亭, 1867–1938, China, nf)
- Wang Yun (王筠, 1749–1819, China, p/d)
- Yun Wang (born 1964, China/US, p/nf)
- Wang Zhen (王禎, 1290–1333, China, nf)
- Gustav von Wangenheim (1895–1975, Germany, d)
- Ayeta Anne Wangusa (born 1971, Uganda, f)
- Timothy Wangusa (born 1942, Uganda, p/f)
- Gakaara wa Wanjaũ (1921–2001, Kenya, nf/ch)
- Alf Wannenburgh (1936–2010, S Africa, nf)
- Zukiswa Wanner (born 1976, Zambia/Kenya, f/nf)
- E. F. Warburg (1908–1966, England, nf)
- J. R. Ward (born 1969, US, f), pseudonym of Jessica Bird
- Jennifer Ward (born 1963, US, ch)
- Maisie Ward (1889–1975, England, nf), born Mary Josephine Ward Sheed
- Mary Ward (1827–1869, Ireland, nf)
- Mary Augusta Ward (1851–1920, England, f/nf)
- Sarah Ward (living, England, f/nf)
- Vicky Ward (born 1969, England/US, nf)
- Florence Warden (1857–1929, England, f)
- Torild Wardenær (born 1951, Norway, p/d)
- Sarah Wardle (born 1969, England, p)
- Terry Wardle (born 1944, England, ch/f)
- Kallistos Ware (1934–2022, England, nf), born Timothy Richard Ware
- Anna Laetitia Waring (1823–1910, Wales/England, p)
- Marilyn Waring (born 1952, N Zealand, nf)
- Emily Warn (living, US, nf/p)
- Charles Dudley Warner (1829–1900, US, nf/f)
- Rex Warner (1905–1986, England, f/nf)
- Sylvia Townsend Warner (1893–1978, England, nf/f/p)
- Myriam Warner-Vieyra (1939–2017, Guadeloupe/Senegal, p/f)
- Blanche Warre-Cornish (1848–1922, England, f/nf)
- Elizabeth Andrew Warren (1786–1864, England, nf)
- Hans Warren (1921–2001, Netherlands, nf/p)
- John Warren, 3rd Baron de Tabley (1835–1895, England, p/nf)
- Meralda Warren (born 1959, Pitcairn Is, nf/ch)
- Pat Warren (born 1936, US, f), pseudonym Patricia Cox
- Robert Penn Warren (1905–1989, US, p/f/nf)
- Doreen Warriner (1904–1972, England, nf)
- Lewis Warsh (1944–2020, US, p/nf)
- Raees Warsi (born 1963, Pakistan/US, p/nf)
- Thomas Warton (1728–1790, England, nf/p)
- Albert Wass (1908–1998, Hungary/US, f/p)
- Jakob Wassermann (1873–1934, Germany, f/nf/p)
- Herbjørg Wassmo (born 1942, Norway, p/f)
- Per Wästberg (born 1933, Sweden, f/p/nf)
- Aleksander Wat (1900–1967, Poland, p/nf), pseudonym of Aleksander Chwat
- Junichi Watanabe (渡辺淳一, 1933–2014, Japan, f)
- On Watanabe (渡辺温, 1902–1930, Japan, nf)
- Risa Wataya (綿矢りさ, born 1984, Japan, f)
- Ellis Waterhouse (1905–1985, England, nf)
- Gilbert Waterhouse (1883–1916, England/France, p)
- Keith Waterhouse (1929–2009, England, f/nf)
- Rachel Waterhouse (1923–2020, England, nf)
- Xavier Waterkeyn (born 1965, Argentina, nf/f)
- Andrew Waterman (born 1940, England, p)
- Sarah Waters (born 1966, Wales/England, f/nf)
- Elizabeth Watkin-Jones (1887–1966, Wales, ch)
- Alfred Watkins (1855–1935, England, nf)
- Vernon Watkins (1906–1967, Wales, p)
- Hamlet Watling (1818–1908, England, nf)
- George Watsky (born 1986, US, p/nf)
- Ian Watson (1943–2026, England/Spain, f)
- Joy Watson (1938–2021, N Zealand, ch)
- Lyall Watson (1939–2008, S Africa, nf)
- Mary Watson (born 1975, S Africa, f)
- Maureen Watson (1931–2009, Australia, ch/p)
- Rosamund Marriott Watson (1860–1911, England, p/nf)
- Samuel Wagan Watson (born 1972, Australia, p)
- Stephen Watson (1954–2011, S Africa, p)
- Thomas Watson (1515–1584, England, nf)
- Thomas Watson (1620–1686, England, nf)
- Thomas Watson (1704–1732, England, p/d)
- Victor Watston (born 1936, England, nf/ch)
- William Watson (1931–2005, Scotland, f/d/nf)
- Barrett Watten (born 1948, US, p/nf)
- Lawrence Watt-Evans (born 1954, US, f)
- Isaac Watts (1674–1748, England, p/nf)
- Vivienne de Watteville (1900–1957, England, nf)
- Theodore Watts-Dunton (1832–1914, England, nf/p)
- Alec Waugh (1898–1981, England, f)
- Arthur Waugh (1866–1943, England, nf/p)
- Auberon Waugh (1931–2001, England, f/nf)
- Edwin Waugh (1817–1890, England, p)
- Evelyn Waugh (1903–1966, England, f/nf)
- Gerard Way (born 1977, US, f)
- Tom Wayman (born 1945, Canada, p/f/nf)
- Adam Ważyk (1905–1982, Russian E/Poland, p/nf)

== We–Wh ==
- Anne Weale (1929–2007, England, f/nf), pseudonym of Jay Blakeney
- Alan Wearne (born 1948, Australia, p)
- Willoughby Weaving (1885–1976, England, p)
- Catherine Webb (born 1986, England, f/ch), pseudonym Kate Griffin
- Francis Webb (1925–1973, Australia, p)
- Harri Webb (1920–1995, Wales, p)
- Marion St John Webb (1888–1930, England, f/p/ch)
- Mary Webb (1881–1927, England, f/p)
- Merryn Somerset Webb (born 1970, England, nf)
- Regina Webb (born 1980, US, ch)
- Sidney Webb, 1st Baron Passfield (1859–1947, England, nf)
- Batty Weber (1860–1940, Luxembourg, f/nf/p)
- David Weber (born 1952, US, f)
- Benjamin Nottingham Webster (1797–1882, England, d)
- John Webster (c. 1580 – 1632, England, d)
- Rebecca Wee (living, US, p/nf)
- Ian Wedde (born 1946, N Zealand, p/f/nf)
- Hermann von Wedderkop (1875–1956, Germany/Italy, nf/f)
- Frank Wedekind (1864–1918, Germany, d)
- Michi Weglyn (1926–1999, US, nf)
- Armin T. Wegner (1886–1978, Germany/Italy, nf)
- Josef Magnus Wehner (1897–1973, Germany, nf/d)
- Wei Boyang (魏伯陽, fl. 2nd c. CE, China, nf)
- Wei Huacun (魏華存, 252–334 CE, China, nf)
- Wei Hui (周衛慧, born 1973, China, f)
- Wei Shou (魏收, 506–572, China, nf)
- Wei Shuo (衛鑠, 272–349, China, p)
- Wen Yiduo (聞一多, 1899–1946, China, p)
- Wei Yingwu (韋應物, c. 737 – c. 792, China, p)
- Wei Yuan (魏源, 1794–1857, China, nf)
- Wei Zheng (魏徵, 580–643, China, nf)
- Wei Zhuang (韋莊, c. 836–910, China, p)
- Wilhelm Weigand (1862–1949, Germany, p/f)
- André Weil (1906–1998, France, nf)
- Simone Weil (1909–1943, France/England, nf)
- Sylvie Weil (born 1942, France, ch/nf)
- Sadie Rose Weilerstein (1894–1993, US, ch)
- Elizabeth E. Wein (born 1964, US/Scotland, ch/nf)
- Stanley G. Weinbaum (1902–1935, US, f)
- Samantha Weinberg (living, England, f/nf)
- Hannah Weiner (1928–1997, US, p)
- Debra Weinstein (born 1961, US, p/f)
- Helen Weinzweig (1915–2010, Canada, f)
- Andy Weir (born 1972, US, f)
- Alison Weir (born 1951, England, nf/f)
- Theresa Weir (born c. 1950s, US, f), pseudonym Anne Frasier
- Ernst Weiss (1882–1940, Austria/France, f)
- Peter Weiss (1916–1982, Germany/Sweden, d/f)
- Wilhelm Weitling (1808–1871, Germany/US, nf)
- Denton Welch (1915–1948, China/England, f/nf)
- Julie Welch (born 1948, England, nf/d)
- Ronald Welch (1909–1982, England, f)
- Fay Weldon (1931–2023, England, f/nf/d)
- Elisabeth Welhaven (1815–1901, Norway, f)
- Johan Sebastian Welhaven (1807–1873, Norway, p/nf)
- Ehm Welk (1884–1966, Germany, d/f)
- Julius Wellhausen (1844–1918, Germany, nf)
- H. G. Wells (1866–1946, England, f/nf)
- John Wells (1936–1998, England, nf)
- Martha Wells (born 1964, US, f/nf)
- Peter Wells (1950–2019, N Zealand, f/nf/d)
- Louise Welsh (born 1965, England/Scotland, f/d)
- Irvine Welsh (born 1958, Scotland/US, f/d)
- Harald Welzer (born 1958, Germany, nf)
- Adèle Weman (1844–1936, Finland, f/ch/p)
- Wen Tianxiang (文天祥, 1236–1283, China, p)
- Wen Yiduo (聞一多, 1899–1946, China, p/nf)
- Wen Zhengming (文徵明, 1470–1559, China, p)
- Wen Zhenheng (文震亨, 1585–1645, China, nf/p)
- Albert Wendt (born 1939, Samoa/N Zealand, f)
- Louise Wener (born 1966, England, f)
- Anne Wentworth (1629/1630 – post-1679, England, nf)
- K. D. Wentworth (1951–2012, US, f)
- Marjory Heath Wentworth (born 1958, US, p)
- William Wentworth (1790–1872, Norfolk Island/Australia, nf/p)
- Sándor Weöres (1913–1989, Hungary, p)
- Bernard Werber (born 1961, France, f)
- Miriam Were (born 1940, Kenya, nf)
- Franz Werfel (1890–1945, Austrian E/US, f/d/p)
- Henrik Wergeland (1808–1845, Norway, p/d/nf)
- Benedikt Maria Leonhard von Werkmeister (1745–1823, Germany, nf)
- Markus Werner (1944–2016, Switzerland, f)
- Zacharias Werner (1768–1823, Germany/Austria, p/d/nf)
- Christian Wernicke (1661–1725, Germany/Denmark, nf)
- Charles Wesley (1707–1778, England, p)
- John Wesley (1703–1791, England, nf)
- Mary Wesley (1912–2002, England, f)
- Johan Herman Wessel (1742–1785, Norway/Denmark, p/nf/d)
- Ignaz Heinrich von Wessenberg (1774–1860, Germany, nf)
- Charles West (1927–2021, England, f)
- Cornel West (born 1953, US, nf)
- Gilbert West (1703–1756, England, p/nf)
- Jacqueline West (born 1979, US, ch/p)
- Jane West (1758–1852, England, f/p/nf)
- Joyce West (1908–1985, N Zealand, f/ch)
- Morris West (1916–1999, Australia, f/d)
- Nathanael West (1903–1940, US, f)
- Rebecca West (1892–1983, England, nf/f)
- Wallace West (1900–1980, US, f)
- Robert Westall (1929–1993, England, ch)
- William Bury Westall (1834–1903, England, f)
- Frank Atha Westbury (1938–2001, England, f/ch/p)
- Scott Westerfeld (born 1963, US, f/ch)
- John F. C. Westerman (1901–1991, England/Spain, ch)
- Percy F. Westerman (1876–1959, England, ch)
- Jeri Westerson (born 1960, US, f)
- Carol Weston (born 1956, US, f/nf/ch)
- Edward Weston (1703–1770, England, nf)
- Elizabeth Jane Weston (1581 or 1582–1612, England/Bohemia, p)
- Jessie Weston (1850–1928, England, nf)
- Jessie Weston (1867–1939, N Zealand, f)
- Janwillem van de Wetering (1931–2008, Netherlands/US, ch/f/nf)
- Johann Jakob Wettstein (1693–1754, Switzerland, nf)
- Lydia Wevers (1950–2021, N Zealand, nf)
- Marie Wexelsen (1832–1911, Norway, p/ch/f)
- Stanley J. Weyman (1855–1928, England, f)
- Suzanne Weyn (born 1955, US, ch)
- Philip Whalen (1923–2002, US, p/nf)
- William J. Whalen (1926–2008, US, nf)
- Anne Wharton (1659–1685, England/France, p)
- Edith Wharton (1862–1937, US, f)
- Goodwin Wharton (1653–1704, England, nf)
- Herb Wharton (born 1936, Australia, p/f)
- Thomas Wharton (born 1963, Canada, f)
- Mary Whateley (1738–1825, England, p/d)
- Patience Wheatcroft (born 1951, England, nf)
- Dennis Wheatley (1897–1977, England, f), pseudonym Leo Kessler
- Phillis Wheatley (c. 1753–1784, W Africa/US, p)
- Charles Wheatstone (1902–1975, England/France, nf)
- Billy Edd Wheeler (born 1932, US, p/d)
- Donald J. Wheeler (living, US, nf)
- Abraham Wheelocke (1593–1653, England, nf)
- Gloria Whelan (born 1923, US, p/f/ch)
- Eric Whelpton (1894–1981, England, nf)
- Edith Holt Whetham (1911–2001, England, nf)
- William Whewell (1794–1866, England, nf/p)
- Benjamin Whichcote (1609–1683, England, nf)
- Dorothy Whipple (1893–1966, England, f/ch)
- Charles Whistler (1856–1913, England, f)
- William Whiston (1667–1752, England, nf)
- Evelyn Whitaker (1844–1929, England, ch)
- Phil Whitaker (born 1966, England, f/nf)
- Annabelle White (living, N Zealand, nf)
- Antonia White (1899–1980, England, f/nf/ch)
- Dorothy White (c. 1630–1686, England, nf)
- Dorothy Neal White (1915–1995, N Zealand, nf)
- E. B. White (1899–1985, US, ch/nf)
- Ellen G. White (1827–1915, US, nf)
- Emily White (1839–1936, N Zealand, nf)
- Ethel Lina White (1876–1944, England, f)
- Fred M. White (1859–1935, England, f)
- Hale White (1831–1913, England, f/nf), pseudonym Mark Rutherford
- Henry Kirke White (1785–1806, England, p)
- James White (1928–1999, N Ireland, f)
- James L. White, 1936–1981, US, p)
- Laura Rosamond White (1844–1922, US, f/nf/p)
- Michael White (1959–2018, England/Australia, f/nf)
- Patrick White (1912–1990, England/Australia, f/d)
- Rowland White (born 1970, England, nf)
- Steve White (born 1948, US, f)
- T. H. White (1906–1964, England, f)
- Theodore H. White (1915–1986, US/China, nf)
- Tony White (born 1964, England, f/nf)
- Anne Whitehead (1624–1686, England, nf)
- Colson Whitehead (born 1969, US, f/nf)
- Þór Whitehead (born 1943, Iceland, nf)
- Richard Whiteing (1840–1928, England, f/nf)
- John Whitgift (c. 1530–1604, England, nf)
- Katharine Whitehorn (1928–2021, England, nf)
- Charles Whiting (1926–2007, England, f/nf)
- Walt Whitman (1819–1892, US, p/nf)
- Isabella Whitney (c. 1546/1548 – post-1624, England, p)
- Stephanie Grace Whitson (born 1952, US, f)
- Reed Whittemore (1919–2012, US, p/nf)
- John Greenleaf Whittier (1807–1892, US, p)
- Selby Whittingham (born 1941, Malaya/England, nf)
- Richard Whittington-Egan (1924–2016, England, nf)
- George Whyte-Melville (1821–1878, Scotland/England, f/p)

== Wi ==
- Randy Wicker (born 1938, US, nf)
- Anna Wickham (1883–1947, England/Australia, p), pseudonym of Edith Alice Mary Harper
- Les Wicks (born 1955, Australia, p)
- Zoë Wicomb (1948–2025, S Africa/Scotland, f/nf)
- John Edgar Wideman (born 1941, US, f/nf)
- Martin Widmark (born 1961, Sweden, ch)
- Urs Widmer (1938–2014, Switzerland, f/d/nf)
- Ulrika Widström (1764–1841, Sweden, p)
- Ernst Wiechert (1887–1950, Germany/Switzerland, f/nf)
- Carsten Wieland (born 1971, Germany, nf)
- Christoph Martin Wieland (1733–1813, Germany, p/f)
- Gabriela Wiener (born 1975, Peru, nf/f/p)
- John Wieners (1934–2002, US, p)
- Kazimierz Wierzyński (1894–1969, Kingdom of Galicia and Lodomeria/Poland, p/nf)
- Elie Wiesel (1928–2016, Romania/US, f/nf)
- Michael Wiesenberg (born 1943, US, nf)
- Kate Douglas Wiggin (1856–1923, US/England, ch)
- Michael Wigglesworth (1631–1705, England/New England, p)
- Susan Wiggs (born 1958, US, f)
- Edward Wightman (c. 1580–1612, England, nf)
- Henry Wilberforce (1807–1873, England, nf)
- Adolf Wilbrandt (1837–1911, Germany, f/d)
- Richard Wilbur (1921–2017, US, p/nf)
- J. Rodolfo Wilcock (1919–1978, Argentina/Italy, p/f/nf)
- Dora Wilcox (1873–1953, N Zealand/Australia, p/d)
- Susie Wild (born 1979, England/Wales, p/f/nf)
- Robert Wild (1615–1679, England, nf)
- Jane Wilde (1821–1896, Ireland, p), pseudonym Speranza
- Jennifer Wilde (1938–1990, US, f), pseudonym of Tom E. Huff
- Oscar Wilde (1854–1900, Ireland/England, p/d)
- Stuart Wilde (1946–2013, England, nf/p)
- Peter Wildeblood (1823–1899, England/Canada, f/d/nf)
- Ernst von Wildenbruch (1845–1909, Lebanon/Germany, p/d)
- Gisken Wildenvey (1892–1985, Norway, f)
- Herman Wildenvey (1885–1959, Norway, p)
- Cherry Wilder (1930–2002, N Zealand, f)
- Gene Wilder (1933–2016, US, d), pseudonym of Jerome Silberman
- Laura Ingalls Wilder (1867–1957, US, ch)
- Thornton Wilder (1897–1975, US, d/f)
- Kate Wilhelm (1928–2018, US, f)
- Urien Wiliam (1929–2006, Wales, f/d)
- John Wilkes (1725–1797, England, nf)
- Kathy Wilkes (1946–2003, England, nf)
- Damien Wilkins (born 1963, N Zealand, f/p)
- George Wilkins (died 1618, England, d/nf)
- Gina Wilkins (born 1954, US, f), pseudonym of Gina Ferris
- Vaughan Wilkins (1890–1959, England, f/nf)
- Verna Wilkins (born 1943, Grenada/England, ch)
- William Henry Wilkins (1860–1905, England, nf), pseudonym W. H. de Winton
- John Wilkinson (born 1953, England, p)
- Sarah Scudgell Wilkinson (1779–1831, England, ch/f/nf)
- Eileen Wilks (born 1952, US, f)
- Freddy Will (born 1977, Sierra Leone/Canada, f/p), pseudonym of Wilfred Kanu Jr.
- Geoffrey Willans (1911–1958, Ottoman E/England, ch)
- Alice Willard (1860–1936, US, nf)
- Barbara Willard (1909–1994, England, ch)
- Bruno Wille (1860–1928, Germany, nf)
- Jan Frans Willems (1793–1846, Belgium, p/nf)
- Mo Willems (born 1968, US, ch)
- Roger Willemsen (1955–2016, Germany, nf)
- Sabin Willett (born 1957, US, f/nf)
- William IX, Duke of Aquitaine (1071–1127, Aquitaine, p)
- William of Malmesbury (c. 1095 – c. 1143, England, nf)
- Aeneas Francon Williams (1886–1971, Scotland, p/nf)
- Alan Williams (1935–2020, England, f/nf)
- Anna Williams (1706–1783, Wales/England, p)
- Charles Williams (1886–1945, England, p/f/nf)
- Charlie Williams (born 1971, England, f)
- Colin H. Williams (born 1950, Wales/England, nf)
- David Williams (born 1971, England/US, f)
- David John Williams (1885–1970, Wales, nf/f)
- Donna Williams (1963–2017, Australia, nf)
- Eliseus Williams (1867–1926, Wales, p), bardic name Eifion Wyn
- Emmett Williams (1925–2007, US/Germany, p)
- Frederick Smeeton Williams (1829–1886, England, nf)
- Gareth F. Williams (1955–2016, Wales, f/ch/d)
- Glanmor Williams (1920–2005, Wales, nf)
- Griffith Williams (Gutyn Peris) (1769–1838, Wales, p)
- Gwynne Williams (born 1937, Wales, p/nf)
- Heathcote Williams (1941–2017, England, p/nf/d)
- Ifor Williams (1881–1965, Wales, nf)
- J. Lloyd Williams (1854–1945, Wales, nf)
- Jane Williams (1806–1885, Wales/England, nf), Bardic name Ysgafell
- John Ellis Williams (1924–2008, Wales, f/ch)
- John Owen Williams (Pedrog) (1853–1932, Wales, p)
- John Richard Williams (1867–1924, Wales, p), bardic name Tryfanwy
- Jonathan Williams (1929–2008, US, nf/p)
- Joy Williams (born 1944, US, f/nf)
- Karen Lynn Williams (born 1952, US, ch)
- Kate Williams (born 1974, England, f/nf)
- Maiya Williams (born 1962, US, ch/d)
- Margaret Wetherby Williams (1901–1984, Canada/England, f), writing as Margaret Erskine
- Margery Williams (1881–1944, England/US, ch)
- Megan Williams (1984, Canada, ch/nf)
- Miller Williams (1930–2015, US, p)
- Morris Williams (1809–1874, Wales, nf)
- Moses Williams (1685–1742, Wales/England, nf)
- Nigel Williams (born 1948, England, f/d)
- Oneeka Williams (born 1966, Guyana/US, nf/ch)
- Oscar Williams (1900–1964, Ukraine/US, p), pseudonym of Oscar Kaplan
- Owen Williams (Owen Gwyrfai) (1790–1874, Wales, nf)
- Peter Bailey Williams (1763–1836, Wales, nf)
- Rhydwen Williams (1916–1997, Wales, p/f/nf)
- Richard Bryn Williams (1902–1981, Wales, ch/p/nf)
- Richard Hughes Williams (1878–1919, Wales, f), pseudonym Dic Tryfan
- Robert Williams (Robert ap Gwilym Ddu) (1766–1850, Wales, p)
- Robert Williams (Trebor Mai) (1830–1877, Wales, p)
- Robert Dewi Williams (1870–1955, Wales, f/nf)
- Robina Williams (living, England, f)
- Rowan Williams (born 1950, Wales, nf/p)
- Rowland Williams (Hwfa Môn) (1823–1905, Wales, p)
- Saul Williams (born 1972, US, p/nf)
- Sherley Anne Williams (1944–1999, US, p/f/d)
- T. Marchant Williams (1845–1914, Wales, nf)
- Tad Williams (born 1957, US, f/ch)
- Tennessee Williams (1911–1983, US, dr/f/nf)
- Ursula Moray Williams (1911–2006, England, ch)
- W. Llewelyn Williams (1867–1922, Wales, nf)
- Waldo Williams (1904–1971, Wales, p/nf)
- Walter Jon Williams (born 1953, US, f/nf)
- William Carlos Williams (1883–1963, US, p/nf)
- William Williams (Caledfryn) (1801–1869, Wales, p/nf)
- William Williams (Creuddynfab) (1814–1869, Wales, p/nf)
- William Williams (Crwys) (1875–1968, Wales, p)
- William Williams Pantycelyn (1717–1791, Wales, p/nf)
- Rita Williams-Garcia (born 1957, US, ch)
- Frank S. Williamson (1865–1936, England/Australia, p)
- Henry Williamson (1895–1977, England, f/nf)
- Jack Williamson (1908–2006, US, f)
- Marianne Williamson (born 1952, US, nf)
- Michael Z. Williamson (born 1967, England/US, f)
- Penelope Williamson (living, US, f), pseudonym of Elizabeth Lambert
- Connie Willis (born 1945, US, f/nf)
- Dave Willis (born 1970, US, d)
- Nathaniel Parker Willis (1806–1867, US, nf/p)
- Ted Willis, Baron Willis (1914–1992, England, d/f/nf)
- Lucy Wills (1888–1964, England, nf)
- Quentin Willson (born 1957, England, nf)
- Clive Wilmer (1945–2025, England, p/nf)
- Val Wilmer (born 1941, England, nf)
- Willem Wilmink (1936–2003, Netherlands, p/nf/ch)
- John Wilmot, 2nd Earl of Rochester (1647–1680, England, p)
- Cassandra Willoughby, Duchess of Chandos (1670–1735, England, nf)
- Eleanor Wilner (born 1937, US, p)
- A. N. Wilson (born 1950, England, f/nf)
- Amrit Wilson (born 1941, India/England, nf)
- Angus Wilson (1913–1991, England, f/d)
- Anne Elizabeth Wilson (1901–1946, United States/Canada, p/f/nf)
- Brandon Wilson (born 1953, US, nf)
- Bryan R. Wilson (1926–2004, England, nf)
- Budge Wilson (1927–1921, Canada, ch)
- Clement Wilson (born 1976, Ireland/Scotland, nf)
- Colin Wilson (1931–2013, England, nf/f)
- David Henry Wilson (born 1937, England, ch/d)
- Doirean Wilson (living, England, nf)
- Ella B. Ensor Wilson (1838–1913, US, nf)
- Guthrie Wilson (1914–1984, N Zealand/Australia, f)
- Helen Wilson (1869–1957, N Zealand, nf)
- Henry Schütz Wilson (1824–1902, England, f/nf)
- Jacqueline Wilson (born 1945, England, ch)
- Peter Lamborn Wilson (born 1945, US, p/nf), pseudonym Hakim Bey
- Robert Anton Wilson (1932–2007, US, nf)
- Robert Charles Wilson (born 1953, US/Canada, f)
- Jane Wilson-Howarth (born 1954, England, nf/f/ch)
- Christian Wiman (born 1966, US, p/nf)
- William Upski Wimsatt (born 1977, US, nf)
- Aye Aye Win (born 1953, Burma/Myanmar, nf)
- Khin Maung Win (1940–2021, Burma/Myanmar, nf)
- Ludu Sein Win (1940–2012, Burma/Myanmar, nf)
- R. Foster Winans (born 1948, US, nf)
- Johann Joachim Winckelmann (1717–1768, Germany/Austrian E, nf)
- Gerard Windsor (born 1944, Australia, f/nf)
- Harry de Windt (1856–1933, France/England, nf)
- Liz Winfield (born 1964, Australia, p)
- David Wingate (1828–1892, Scotland, p)
- R. D. Wingfield (1928–2007, England, d)
- David Wingrove (born 1952, England, f)
- Eugen Gottlob Winkler (1912–1936, Switzerland/Germany, nf)
- Henry Winkler (born 1955, US, f/nf/ch)
- Mark Winkler (born 1966, S Africa, f)
- Arthur Winnington-Ingram (1858–1946, England, nf)
- Kathleen Winsor (1919–2003, US, f)
- Leon de Winter (born 1954, Netherlands, f/d)
- Timothy Winter (born 1960, England, nf)
- William Winter (1836–1917, US, nf)
- Henry Winterfeld (1901–1990, Germany/US, ch)
- Kari-Lynn Winters (born 1969, Canada, ch/d/nf)
- Yvor Winters (1900–1968, US, p/nf)
- Jeanette Winterson (born 1959, England, f/ch/nf)
- Elizabeth Winthrop (born 1948, US, ch)
- Kwasi Wiredu (1931–2022, Gold Coast/Ghana, nf)
- Justine Constance Wirix-van Mansvelt (1876–1937, Netherlands, nf)
- Carl David af Wirsén (1842–1912, Sweden, p/nf)
- Einar af Wirsén (1875–1946, Sweden, nf)
- Adam Wiśniewski-Snerg (1937–1995, Poland, f)
- George Wither (1588–1667, England, p/nf)
- Pam Withers (born 1956, US/Canada, ch/nf)
- Stanisław Ignacy Witkiewicz (1885–1939, Russian E/Poland, nf/d/f), pseudonym Witkacy
- Heinrich Wittenwiler (c. 1370–1420, Germany, p)
- Karl August Wittfogel (1896–1988, Germany/US, d/nf)
- Stefan Witwicki (1801–1847, Russian E/France, p)

== Wo–Wr ==
- P. G. Wodehouse (1881–1975, England/US, f)
- Tsering Woeser (born 1966, China (Tibet), f/nf/p)
- Gabriele Wohmann (1932–2015, Germany, f)
- Rafał Wojaczek (1945–1971, Poland, p)
- Grażyna Wojcieszko (born 1957, Poland, p)
- Christa Wolf (1929–2011, Germany, f/nf)
- Friedrich Wolf (1888–1953, Germany, d/f)
- Joan Wolf (born 1951, US, f)
- Charles Wolfe (1791–1823, Ireland, p)
- Ernie Wolfe III (born 1950, US, nf)
- Gene Wolfe (1931–2019, US, f)
- Thomas Wolfe (1900–1938, US, f)
- Tom Wolfe (1930–2018, US, nf)
- Betje Wolff (1738–1804, Netherlands, f)
- Christian Wolff (1679–1754, Germany, nf)
- Egon Wolff (1926–2016, Chile, d/f)
- Julius Wolff (1834–1910, Germany, f/p)
- Tobias Wolff (born 1945, US, f/nf)
- Wolfram von Eschenbach (c. 1160/1180 – c. 1220, Germany, p)
- Frances Wolfreston (1607–1677, England, nf)
- Karl Wolfskehl (1869–1948, Germany/N Zealand, p/f/d)
- Jan Wolkers (1925–2007, Netherlands, f)
- Donald A. Wollheim (1914–1990, US, f), pseudonyms include David Grinnell
- Richard Wollheim (1923–2003, England, nf)
- Hans Wollschläger (1935–2007, Germany, f/nf)
- Abel Wolman (1892–1989, US, nf)
- M. Gordon Wolman (1924–2010, US, nf)
- Frances Garnet Wolseley, 2nd Viscountess Wolseley (1872–1936, England, nf)
- Maryla Wolska (1873–1930, Poland, p), pseudonym Iwo Płomieńczy
- Mary Wollstonecraft (1759–1797, England, nf/f)
- Sholeh Wolpé (born 1962, Iran/US, p/d)
- Ernst von Wolzogen (1855–1934, Germany, nf)
- Jack Womack (born 1956, US, f)
- Alison Wong (born 1960, N Zealand, p/f)
- Elizabeth Wong (born 1937, China/N Zealand, f)
- Anthony Wood (1632–1695, England, nf)
- Audrey Wood (born 1948, US, ch)
- Barbara Wood (born 1947, England/US, f)
- Christopher Wood (1935–2015, d/f)
- Ellen Wood (1814–1887, England, f), mainly known as Mrs Henry Wood
- Gordon S. Wood (1933–2026, US, nf)
- John Medley Wood (1827–1915, England/S Africa, nf)
- Julia A. Wood (1840–1927, United States, nf)
- Michael Wood (born 1948, England, nf)
- Ramsay Wood (fl. 1981–1990, England, f)
- Susan Wood (1836–1880, p/f)
- George Woodcock (1912–1995, Canada, nf)
- Robert Woodford (1606–1654, England, nf)
- James Woodforde (1740–1803, England, nf)
- Leslie Woodgate (1900–1961, England, nf)
- Alice Woodhouse (1883–1977, N Zealand, nf)
- Barbara Woodhouse (1910–1988, Ireland/England, nf)
- Martin Woodhouse (1932–2011, England, f/d)
- Kathleen E. Woodiwiss (1939–2007, US, f)
- Richard Woodman (born 1944, England, f/nf)
- Edwards Woods (1877–1953, England, nf)
- Gregory Woods (born 1953, Egypt/England, p)
- Margaret Louisa Woods (1855–1945, England, f/p)
- Sherryl Woods (born 1944, US, f), pseudonym Alexandra Kirk
- Stuart Woods (1938–2022, US, f)
- Jacqueline Woodson (born 1963, US, ch)
- Arthur Smith Woodward (1864–1944, England, nf)
- Emily Woof (born 1967, England, d/f)
- Robert Woof (1931–2005, England, nf)
- Greg Woolf (born 1961, England, nf)
- Virginia Woolf (1882–1941, England, f/nf)
- Cornell Woolrich (1903–1968, US, f), pseudonym William Irish
- Sarah Chauncey Woolsey (1835–1905, US, ch/nf), pseudonym Susan Coolidge
- Thomas Woolston (1668–1733, England, nf)
- Sue Wootton (born 1961, N Zealand, p/f)
- Anne Eyre Worboys (1920–2007, N Zealand, f)
- Dorothy Wordsworth (1771–1855, England, p/nf)
- William Wordsworth (1770–1850, England, p)
- Jerome J. Workman, Jr. (born 1952, US, nf)
- Lucy Worsley (born 1973, England, f/nf/ch)
- Philip Stanhope Worsley (1835–1866, England, p)
- T. C. Worsley (1907–1977, England, nf)
- Molly Worthen (born 1981, US, nf)
- Herman Wouk (1915–2019, US, f/nf)
- Ted Wragg (1938–2005, England, nf)
- Frederic Charles Lascelles Wraxall (1828–1865, England, nf)
- Patricia C. Wrede (born 1953, US, f/ch)
- Chandos Wren-Hoskyns (1812–1876, England, nf)
- Carolyn D. Wright (1949–2016, US, p)
- Charles Wright (born 1935, US, p/nf)
- Dare Wright (1914–2001, Canada/US, ch)
- David Wright (1920–1994, S Africa/England, p/nf)
- David Wright (born 1964, US, nf)
- David McKee Wright (1869–1928, Ireland/Australia, p/nf)
- Douglas E. Wright (born 1955, Canada, f)
- Francesca Wright (1897–1985, England, f/d), pseudonym of Denise Naomi Klein
- Franz Wright (1953–2015, Austria/US, p)
- Helena Rosa Wright (1887–1982, England, nf)
- James Wright (1927–1980, US, p)
- Jay Wright (born 1935, US, p/d/nf)
- John C. Wright (born 1961, US, f)
- Judith Wright (1915–2000, Australia, p/nf)
- Kit Wright (born 1944, England, p/ch)
- Melinda Wright (1946–2011, England, f), pseudonym of Penelope Jones Halsall
- Niel Wright (born 1933, N Zealand, p/nf)
- S. Fowler Wright (1874–1865, England, p/f/d)
- Patricia Wrightson (1921–2010, Australia, ch)
- Lady Mary Wroth (1587–1653, England, p)
- Eva-Lis Wuorio (1918–1988, Finland/Canada, ch)
- Johann David Wyss (1743–1818, Switzerland, ch)

== Wu–Wy ==
- Wu Cheng'en (吳承恩, c. 1500–1582 or 1505–1580, China, f/p)
- Wu Chuntao (吳春桃, born 1963, China, nf)
- Fan Wu (吴帆, born 1974, China/US, f)
- Wu Jiaji (吳嘉紀, 1618–1684, China, p)
- Wu Jingzi (吳敬梓, 1701–1754, China, f)
- Wu Qi (吳起, 440–381 BCE, China, nf)
- Wu Wenjun (吴文俊, 1919–2017, China, nf)
- Wu Zao (吳藻, 1799–1862, China, p)
- Wu Zhihui (吳稚暉, 1865–1953, China, nf)
- Mammo Wudneh (1931–2012, Ethiopia, d/nf)
- Paul Wühr (1927–2016, Germany/Italy, f/p/d)
- Min Thu Wun (1909–2004, Burma/Myanmar, p/f)
- Maung Wunna (1945–2011, Burma/Myanmar, d/nf/f)
- Maung Wuntha (1945–2013, Burma/Myanmar, nf)
- Hella Wuolijoki (1886–1964, Estonia/Finland, d)
- Audrey Wurdemann (1911–1960, US, p/f)
- Rudolph Wurlitzer (born 1937, US, f/d)
- Mathilde Wurm (1874–1935, Germany/England, nf)
- Wuzhun Shifan (無準師範, 1178–1249, China, nf)
- Thomas Wyatt (1503–1542, England, p)
- Woodrow Wyatt (1918–1997, England, nf)
- Józef Wybicki (1747–1822, Poland/Prussia, p/d/nf)
- William Wycherley (1641–1716, England, d)
- Edward Wyke-Smith (1871–1935, England, f/ch)
- Elinor Wylie (1885–1928, US, p/f)
- I. A. R. Wylie (1885–1959, Australia/US, f/d/p)
- Eirug Wyn (1950–2004, Wales, f)
- Hedd Wyn (1887–1917, Wales/Belgium, p), birth name Ellis Humphrey Evans
- John Wyndham (1903–1969, England, f), pseudonym of John Wyndham Parkes Lucas Beynon Harris
- Garrison W. Wynn (born 1961, US, nf)
- Ellis Wynne (1671–1734, Wales, f)
- Frances Wynne (1863–1893, Ireland/England, p)
- Grace Wynne-Jones (living, Ireland/England, nf)
- Sylvia Wynter (born 1928, Cuba/Jamaica, f/nf/d)
- Edward Alexander Wyon (1842–1872, England, p)
- Stanisław Wyspiański (1869–1907, Austrian E, d/p)
- Johann David Wyss (1743–1818, Switzerland, f)
- Johann Rudolf Wyss (1782–1830, Switzerland, p)
