= Tianmen =

Tianmen 天门市 Tienmen
- County-level & Sub-prefectural city
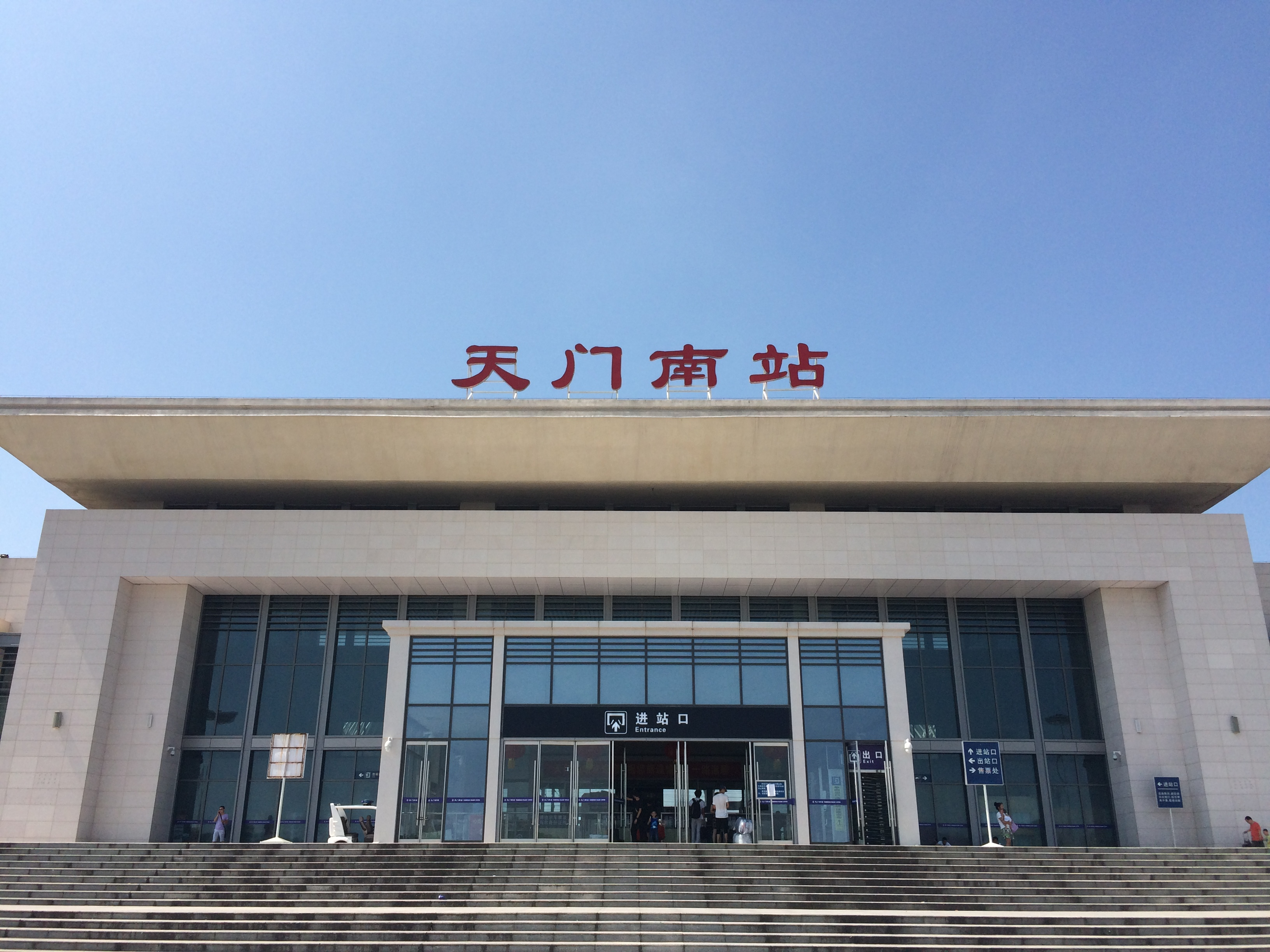
- Tianmen South Station Entrance Hall

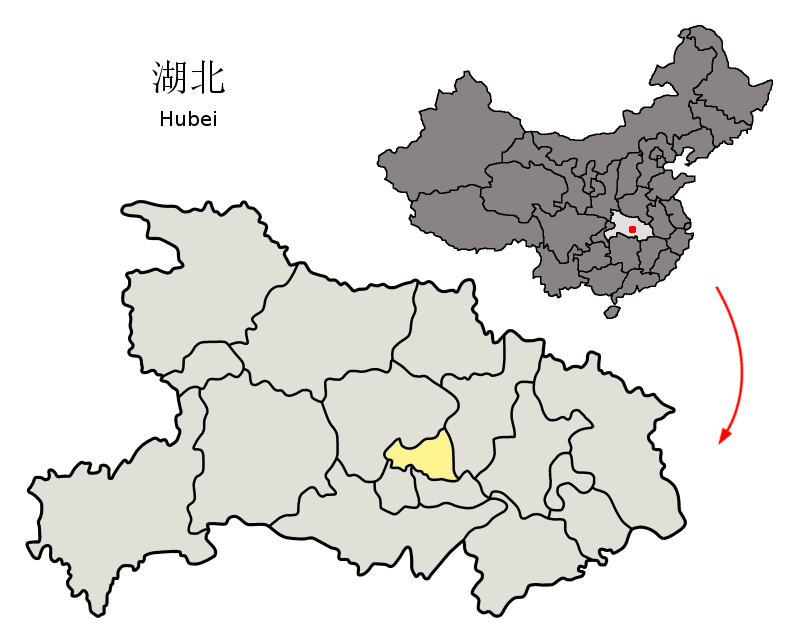
- Location of Tianmen City jurisdiction in Hubei

- Location of the city centre in Hubei
- Coordinates (Tianmen government): 30°39′50″N 113°10′01″E
- country: People's Republic of China
- Province: Hubei

Area
  - County-level & Sub-prefectural city: 2,622 km^{2} (1,012 sq mi)
  - Urban: 324.40 km^{2} (125.25 sq mi)
- Elevation: 32 m (105 ft)

Population (2022)
  - County-level & Sub-prefectural city: 1,105,800
  - Density: 421.7/km^{2} (1,092/sq mi)
  - Urban: 301,000
  - Urban density: 928/km^{2} (2,400/sq mi)

GDP
  - County-level & Sub-prefectural city: CN¥ 71.2 billion US$ 9.9 billion
  - Per capita: CN¥ 64,707; US$ 9,010
- Time zone: UTC+8 (China Standard)
- Website: 天门市人民政府门户网站 (translation: Tianmen City People's Government Web Portal) (in Simplified Chinese)

Tianmen (simplified Chinese: 天门; traditional Chinese: 天門; pinyin: Tiānmén; lit. 'sky gate') is a sub-prefecture-level city (sometimes considered a county-level city) in central Hubei Province, China.

It is on the Jianghan Plain, on the west side of Wuhan (the biggest city of Central China, as well as the capital of Hubei) and the northeast of Jingzhou (a famous city in Chinese history). Formerly known as Jingling (竟陵), it was renamed to Tianmen in 1726 during the Qing dynasty. The name comes from the Sky Gate Mountains (meaning "tianmen" in Chinese) which lie northwest of the city.

It is the hometown of Lu Yu, the writer of The Classic of Tea, who is respected as "the Sage of Tea" for his contribution to the tea culture. Tianmen has the largest population among the same-level cities in Central China. It was honoured "National Civilized City" by Chinese government in 2014.

== History ==
Prehistoric ancient settlements in the Tianmen area existed at least 7,000 to 8,000 years ago as evidenced by Shijiahe neolithic tribal ruins which include recent discoveries of stone (jade) devices, pottery, bone, mussels, as well as bronze articles and other artifacts, such as those in the original Tao Zu patrilineal cultural heritage period.

In January 2008, more than 100 persons and city officials in Tianmen came under investigation after the fatal beating of a 41-year-old man, Wei Wenhua, general manager of a construction company, who was using his cellphone to photograph a dispute between villagers and city inspectors.

== Population ==
As of the end of 2022, the permanent resident population of Tianmen City was 1,105,800 people.

According to the national census in 2020, the permanent resident population of the city was 1,158,640 people. Compared with the 1,418,913 people from the sixth national census, there was a decrease of 260,273 people over ten years, a decline of 18.34%, with an average annual growth rate of -2.01%. Among them, the male population was 606,285 people, accounting for 52.33% of the total population; the female population was 552,355 people, accounting for 47.67% of the total population. The total population sex ratio (with females as 100) was 109.76. The population aged 0-14 years was 199,948 people, accounting for 17.26% of the total population; the population aged 15-59 years was 659,700 people, accounting for 56.94% of the total population; the population aged 60 and above was 298,992 people, accounting for 25.81% of the total population, among which those aged 65 and above were 208,068 people, accounting for 17.96% of the total population. The population living in urban areas was 502,908 people, accounting for 43.41% of the total population; the population living in rural areas was 655,732 people, accounting for 56.59% of the total population.

In 2024, Tianmen was noted for its relatively high birth rate.

== Overseas Chinese ==
Tianmen City is a famous qiaoxiang (hometown of overseas Chinese) in Hubei province and mainland China. More than 280,000 overseas Chinese of Tianmen descent live in Hong Kong, Macau, and more than 40 countries and regions across five continents. As of today, more than 500 diasporans are currently residing in Tianmen, and their relatives in total numbered 82,000.

The emigration of Tianmen overseas Chinese began at the end of the 18th century, going through several stages including moving northward (to Europe), moving southward (to Southeast Asia), and the new immigration period.

== Culture ==
Tianmen is a renowned cultural hometown. World cultural figures such as the "Tea Saint" Lu Yu, Tang Dynasty poet Pi Rixiu, Ming Dynasty Jingling School literary representative figures Zhong Xing, Tan Yuanchun, and Qing Dynasty top scholar Jiang Liyong were born here. Since the restoration of gaokao (college entrance examination system), Tianmen has sent over 54,000 college students to the nation, earning the reputation of the "hometown of top scholars."

Tianmen is full of places of interest and historical sites. Within its territory is the Stone Age village site of Shijiahe, the largest Neolithic village site in the Yangtze River basin to date, the famous Buddhist temple Bai Long Temple built during the Southern Dynasties, and Lu Yu Pavilion, Wenxue Spring, Ancient Goose Bridge in memory of Lu Yu, as well as Zhong Xing's tomb, Tan Yuanchun's tomb, and the East Lake and West Lake scenic areas.

Hubei Province Tianmen Middle School is a nationally renowned provincial model high school, founded in 1912, located at the western end of the city's Jingling Zhong Xing Avenue. It is a garden-style school in Hubei Province, a provincial model high school, an advanced collective in the national education system, an advanced unit in the construction of spiritual civilization nationwide, with a history of more than one hundred years.

Hubei Province Tianmen Experimental High School is located on the north bank of East Lake in Tianmen. The school's history of education can be traced back to the Tianmen Normal Training Institute founded in the 32nd year of Guangxu in the Qing Dynasty (1906), which has evolved from the elementary, secondary, and tertiary education in the present, changing its name nine times and relocating eight times. In 2004, Tianmen Experimental High School ranked 28th on the comprehensive strength ranking of key middle schools in Hubei Province.

== Geography ==
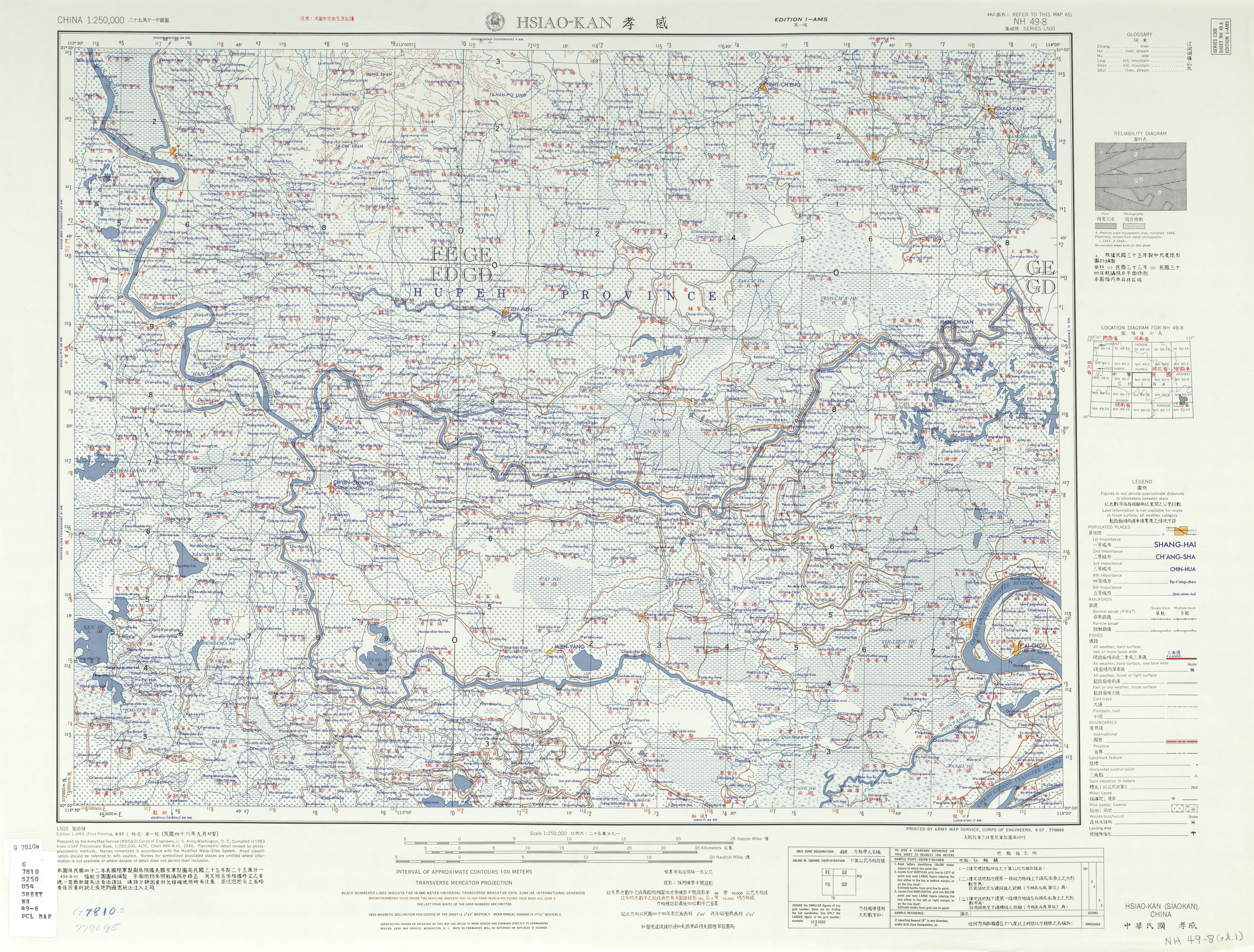
Map including Tianmen (labeled as T'IEN-MEN (walled) 天門) (1953)

=== Administrative divisions ===
Tianmen administers:

#	Name	Chinese (S)
Subdistricts
1	Jingling Subdistrict	竟陵街道
2	Qiaoxiang Subdistrict	侨乡街道 (天门经济开发区)
3	Yanglin Subdistrict	杨林街道
Towns
4	Duobao Town	多宝镇
5	Tuoshi Town	拖市镇
6	Zhanggang Town	张港镇
7	Jiangchang Town	蒋场镇
8	Wangchang Town	汪场镇
9	Yuxin Town (Yü-hsin-ho)	渔薪镇
10	Huangtan Town	黄潭镇
11	Yuekou Town	岳口镇
12	Henglin Town	横林镇
13	Pengshi Town	彭市镇
14	Mayang Town	麻洋镇
15	Duoxiang Town	多祥镇
16	Ganyi Town	干驿镇
17	Mawan Town	马湾镇
18	Lushi Town	卢市镇
19	Xiaoban Town	小板镇
20	Jiuzhen Town	九真镇
21	Zaoshi Town	皂市镇
22	Hushi Town	胡市镇
23	Shijiahe Town (formerly Shihe)	石家河镇 (formerly 石河镇)
24	Fozishan Town	佛子山镇
Townships
25	Jingtan Township	净潭乡
Other Areas
26	Tianmen Industrial Park	天门工业园
27	Jianghu Farm	蒋湖农场
28	Baimaohu Farm	白茅湖农场
29	Chenhu Committee	沉湖管委会

=== Climate ===
Climate data for Tianmen, elevation 32 m (105 ft), (1991–2020 normals, extremes 1981–present)
Month	Jan	Feb	Mar	Apr	May	Jun	Jul	Aug	Sep	Oct	Nov	Dec	Year
Record high °C (°F)	20.4 (68.7)	27.2 (81.0)	32.3 (90.1)	33.9 (93.0)	36.1 (97.0)	37.5 (99.5)	38.8 (101.8)	39.7 (103.5)	37.2 (99.0)	34.3 (93.7)	29.2 (84.6)	22.7 (72.9)	39.7 (103.5)
Mean daily maximum °C (°F)	8.3 (46.9)	11.4 (52.5)	16.2 (61.2)	22.5 (72.5)	27.3 (81.1)	30.2 (86.4)	32.5 (90.5)	32.5 (90.5)	28.7 (83.7)	23.4 (74.1)	17.1 (62.8)	10.8 (51.4)	21.7 (71.1)
Daily mean °C (°F)	4.3 (39.7)	7.1 (44.8)	11.6 (52.9)	17.7 (63.9)	22.7 (72.9)	26.2 (79.2)	28.7 (83.7)	28.2 (82.8)	24.0 (75.2)	18.4 (65.1)	12.3 (54.1)	6.5 (43.7)	17.3 (63.2)
Mean daily minimum °C (°F)	1.3 (34.3)	3.8 (38.8)	8.0 (46.4)	13.8 (56.8)	18.8 (65.8)	22.9 (73.2)	25.6 (78.1)	25.0 (77.0)	20.5 (68.9)	14.8 (58.6)	8.8 (47.8)	3.2 (37.8)	13.9 (57.0)
Record low °C (°F)	−12.7 (9.1)	−6.4 (20.5)	−1.9 (28.6)	1.5 (34.7)	8.6 (47.5)	12.9 (55.2)	18.9 (66.0)	16.2 (61.2)	10.3 (50.5)	2.1 (35.8)	−3.0 (26.6)	−10.6 (12.9)	−12.7 (9.1)
Average precipitation mm (inches)	41.8 (1.65)	52.4 (2.06)	71.3 (2.81)	114.8 (4.52)	151.0 (5.94)	179.1 (7.05)	199.1 (7.84)	97.3 (3.83)	69.5 (2.74)	68.8 (2.71)	50.3 (1.98)	26.8 (1.06)	1,122.2 (44.19)
Average precipitation days (≥ 0.1 mm)	8.3	9.5	11.2	11.5	12.2	11.4	10.6	8.9	7.8	9.9	8.8	7.5	117.6
Average snowy days	4.1	2.2	1.0	0	0	0	0	0	0	0	0.4	1.3	9
Average relative humidity (%)	73	73	73	74	73	77	79	78	75	73	73	71	74
Mean monthly sunshine hours	85.7	84.5	109.5	136.8	150.6	137.0	189.1	197.6	148.4	132.8	120.0	104.6	1,596.6
Percentage possible sunshine	27	27	29	35	35	32	44	49	41	38	38	33	36
Source: China Meteorological Administration

Hometown of overseas Chinese of Central China: Tian men is a major hometown of overseas Chinese in Central Chinese. It is hometown of approximately 80,000 overseas Chinese, and also hometown of about 200,000 Hong Kong people, Macau people and Taiwanese.

== Transportation ==
- Tianmen South Railway Station and Xiantao West Railway Station on the Wuhan–Yichang Railway.

== Notable people ==
- Lu Yu (陆羽; 733–804), tea master and writer, author of The Classic of Tea
- Pi Rixiu (皮日休; c. 834–883), poet
- Zhong Xing (鍾惺; 1574–1625), Ming Dynasty scholar
- Zhang Yesui (张业遂; born 1953), diplomat
- Zhang Lianmeng (张联盟; born 1955), engineer and professor
- Wan Weixing (万卫星; 1958–2020), space physicist
- Wei Juncheng (魏军城; born 1968), mathematician
