= Ernie Wolfe III =

American art expert (born 1950)

Ernie Wolfe III (born July 30, 1950 in Los Angeles, California) is an art curator, gallerist, outdoorsman, field researcher, and author specializing in contemporary and traditional African art. His specialties include Ghanaian film posters, fantasy coffins, pop art, and commercial art, as well as traditional sculpture from across Africa.

Wolfe is also known for his deep connections with many Los Angeles artists including Ed Moses, Billy Al Bengston, Chris Burden, Lita Albuquerque, Peter Alexander, Gwynn Murrill, Tony Berlant, Larry Bell, and Charles Arnoldi, and for juxtaposing their work alongside African art. He also discovered several acclaimed African artists including Joseph Bertiers.

== Early life and education ==
Wolfe was raised in Westwood and on Mulholland Drive as the son of Clare Wolfe and Ernie Wolfe Jr. He graduated from Harvard School for boys in 1968 and from Williams College in 1973 with a degree in Spanish Literature. After his focus shifted to African art in 1975, he studied under Roy Sieber, the first tenured African art professor in the United States Career

Wolfe first became interested in African art while working as a scuba instructor in Kenya in the 1970s for his grandfather and father's business, Wolfe Tours. After fishing on the weekend, he would share the fish that he caught with local tribespeople and began to document and collect the Kenyan arts of utility such as gourds, vessels, neck rests, stools, walking sticks, and clothing that he encountered

Alongside Roy Sieber, Ernie curated the Arts of Kenya exhibition at the Smithsonian Museum in 1979. Two years later he opened a gallery in West Los Angeles called Turkana Primitive and Fine Arts. He expanded to another gallery space, the Ernie Wolfe Gallery in 1989, and to a third gallery, EW3 Gallery, in 2016. Wolfe continues to exhibit, donate, and deal art alongside his wife Diane Wolfe and sons Ernest IV and Russell in Los Angeles.

== Selected publications ==
- Wolfe, Ernie (1979). An Introduction to the Arts of Kenya. Washington, D.C: Museum of African Art, Smithsonian Institution. ISBN 978-0-9603660-0-2.
- Wolfe, Ernie; Parkin, David J.; Sieber, Roy (1986-01-01). Vigango. Williamstown, Mass: Williams College Museum of Art. ISBN 978-0-913697-02-3.
- Bertiers, Joseph (1998). Dateline Kenya. Santa Monica, CA: Smart Art Press. ISBN 978-1-889195-20-9.
- Barker, Clive (2000). Extreme Canvas: Hand-Painted Movie Posters from Ghana. Los Angeles, Calif.: Dilettante Press. ISBN 978-0-9664272-1-9.
