= Mawan, Hubei =

Mawan 马湾镇
- Town
- Location in Hubei
- Coordinates: 30°34′23″N 113°20′03″E
- Country: People's Republic of China
- Province: Hubei
- Sub-prefecture-level city: Tianmen

Area
  - Total: 83.4 km^{2} (32.2 sq mi)
- Elevation: 31 m (102 ft)

Population (2010)
  - Total: 36,632
  - Density: 439/km^{2} (1,140/sq mi)
- Time zone: UTC+8 (China Standard)
- Postal code: 431700
- Area code: 0728

Mawan (simplified Chinese: 马湾; traditional Chinese: 馬灣; pinyin: Mǎwān) is a town of about 41,000 in the east-central part of Hubei province, People's Republic of China. It is under the administration of the sub-prefecture-level city of Tianmen, 19 kilometres (12 mi) to the west-northwest. To the north is Lake Chen (沉湖), and to the north is Lake Hua (华湖).

== Administrative divisions ==
Mawan has undergone several administrative changes since the founding of the People's Republic: in 1950, it was created as a township, changed to a people's commune in 1976, upgraded to a district in 1984, and with the formation of Tianmen as a sub-prefecture-level city, downgraded to a town in 1987. It is noted for being the ancestral hometown of overseas Chinese, spread across 34 nations and territories on 5 continents.

One community:

- Mawan (马湾居委会)

Twenty-five villages:

- Machang (马场村), Chenma (陈马村), Luwan (卢湾村), Zouwan (邹湾村), Zhengwan (郑湾村), Bianhekou (便河口村), Litan (李滩村), Yangang (鄢港村), Zhawu (榨屋村), Hengdi (横堤村), Nanzha (南闸村), Zhangwan (张湾村), Chenhuang (陈黄村), Liaowan (廖湾村), Jianghu (蒋湖村), Zengliu (曾刘村), Guozui (郭咀村), Datai (大台村), Wangchen (汪陈村), Hedi (河堤村), Xiaohu (小湖村), Kuangtai (匡台村), Tukeng (土坑村), Chendu (陈渡村), Chengang (陈港村)
