= Zhang Lianmeng =

Chinese engineer

- 张联盟
- Born: 23 January 1955 (age 71); Tianmen County, Hubei, China
- Education: Wuhan University of Technology; Tohoku University
- Scientific career
- Fields: Complex materials
- Workplaces: Wuhan University of Technology

Chinese name
- Simplified Chinese: 张联盟
- Traditional Chinese: 張聯盟
Transcriptions
Standard Mandarin
- Hanyu Pinyin: Zhāng Liánméng

Zhang Lianmeng (born 23 January 1955) is a Chinese engineer who is a professor and former vice president of Wuhan University of Technology, and an academician of the Chinese Academy of Engineering.

== Biography ==
Zhang was born in the town of Zhanggang, in Tianmen County, Hubei, on 23 January 1955. He studied at Zhanggang High School and received his bachelor's degree and master's degree from Wuhan University of Technology in 1978 and 1986, respectively. He earned his doctor's degree from Tohoku University in 1996.

After graduating, he stayed at the university, where he was promoted to dean of the School of Materials Science and Engineering in April 1997 and vice president in May 2017.

== Honours and awards ==
- 2011 State Technological Invention Award (Second Class)
- 2013 State Science and Technology Progress Award (Second Class)
- 27 November 2017 Member of the Chinese Academy of Engineering (CAE)
- 2017 Member of the Asia Pacific Academy of Materials
