= Wang Wei (Gējì) =

Chinese singer and poet (1597–1647)

- 王微
- Born: 1597; Yangzhou, Ming China
- Died: 1647 (aged 49–50); Qing China
- Occupations: Gējì, Poet, Writer
- Spouse: Xu Yuqing
- Writing career
- Pen name: Caoyi daoren 草衣道人 (Taoist in the straw coat)
- Language: Chinese

Wáng Wēi (Chinese: 王微; 1597–1647), also known by her courtesy name Xiūwēi (Chinese: 修微), was a Chinese Gējì, poet, and traveller during the late Ming dynasty.

== Biography ==
Nothing is known of her family background, other than that she was from Yangzhou. At the age of seven, Wang's father died, leaving her orphaned without any family support. The change in circumstances let to her entering a song and dance venue, where she was trained as Geji. The training included literacy and artistic skills. During this time, she developed a friendship with another Geji, Yang Wan, the two calling themselves "sworn sisters" due to their similar backgrounds. For a time, Wang Wei and Yang Wan were both married to the military official and scholar Mao Yuanyi.

Wang referred to herself as the "Straw-coated Daoist". As a Geji she travelled by skiff between Suzhou and Kuaiji (now Shaoxing). The boat carried many books and she was often accompanied by well known literary figures of the day, including Zhong Xing and Tan Yuanchun, founders of the Jingling school of poetry. She also travelled to West Lake in Wulin (now Hangzhou), a hotspot for literati at the time, and as far as Hunan. Wang Wei was renowned for her outstanding poetry, leading to her being called the "Female Editor" (女校書). At one pount, she had a tomb built for herself. The eminent artists and writers Dong Qichang and Chen Jiru wrote commemorations for the occasion.

Wishing to change her life, she turned to Buddhism and started to travel, dressed in a simple cotton robe. During her travels she climbed to the peaks of Mount Dabie, Mount Xuan, Mount Tianzhu, Mount Kuang and Mount Lu. After travelling she settled in Wulin. She intended to spend the rest of her life there and prepared a tomb for her eventual death. As the Ming dynasty began to crumble, leading to widespread violence and a breakdown of social norms, she turned away from Buddhism.

Wang married a Censorate official, Xu Yuqing. Xu was a man of integrity, and was later dismissed from his post after disagreements with the Chongzhen Emperor. The couple were uprooted after Ming fell in 1644, and moved around the south. Although the couple vowed to live and die together, when Wang died of an illness in 1647, Xu lived on to mourn her.

== Writing ==
Wang was a writer and anthologist of travelogues. She is known to have written several hundred, perhaps partly as a commercial venture catering to the late Ming travel boom. One of these, Ming shan ji (Records of the Famous Mountains), ran to several hundred chapters. Other works of Wang's include "Yueyuan Poetry Collection" (樾媛诗集), "Yuanyoucao" (远游草), "Qishancao" (期山草), "Famous Mountain Records" (名山记), "Yuanyou Manuscript" (远游稿), "Fushantingcao" (浮山亭草), "Yueguan Poetry Collection" (樾馆诗集)", and "Selected Unburned Manuscripts" (未焚稿选). While much of Wang's poetry dealt with the landscape, Tina Lu has argued that nature was only the secondary topic of her work, with the primary focus being a "landscape of nostalgia" that Wang used to express her identity as a traveller.

Her poetry appears in the Zhong Xiang Ci, an anthology of late Ming-early Qing female poets.

Wang's shi poems were described by Qing dynasty commentators as comparable to those of Li Qingzhao and Zhu Shuzhen in their beauty and serenity.

天柱峯

太乙吹爐處依然刻帝青
千峰抱須萼五石煉置形
叨利移金畤神霄墮碧鈴
仙衣如可拂投杖出空冥

Translation:

Heaven's Pillar Peak

At the remotest bend there's a place where the wind blows like a furnace,
unchanged since it was carved in the youth of the gods.
A thousand peaks embrace it like the calyx of a flower,
five boulders look as if they were set with care fathoms apart.
I'm unworthy of being transported to this golden holy place,
the divine firmament sinks down in an azure dome.
My dress flicks fairylike in the wind,
a tossed stick falls through emptiness to the netherworld.

— AzonaL, Issue 5 (2023) Translated by Carolanna Lisonbee
