= Effingham Wilson =

British publisher (1785–1868)

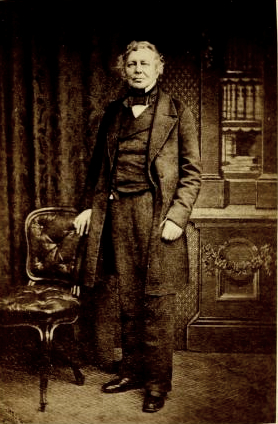
- Effingham Wilson, 1862 photograph
- Born: 28 September 1785; Ravensworth, North Riding of Yorkshire, England
- Died: 9 June 1868 (aged 82); 38 Mildmay Park, Islington, London
- Resting place: Highgate Cemetery
- Citizenship: United Kingdom
- Occupation: Publisher
- Political party: Liberal
- Spouse: Martha Hunt Maria James
- Children: Henry Schütz Wilson

Effingham William Wilson (28 September 1785 – 9 June 1868) was a 19th-century English radical publisher and bookseller. His main interests were in economics and politics, but he also published poetry.

== Early life ==
Wilson was born at Ravensworth in the North Riding of Yorkshire, one of at least five sons to Joseph Wilson (born c.1734) and his wife Jane Hutchinson. Some of his relations had farmed under the Earl of Effingham, which resulted in Wilson's distinctive Christian name. "His earliest years were most happily passed in the neighbourhood of the place of his birth" according to his biography.

When still a boy he was removed to Knaresborough, where he resided with his physician uncle, Dr. Thomas Hutchinson^{FSA} (d. March 1797), to be trained in the medical profession. Dr Hutchinson was "a man of taste and literature" and a friend of William and Dorothy Wordsworth. He owned the skull of the murderer Eugene Aram, having taken the head from the gibbet where the murderer hung, and was assisted in the task by Wilson.

== Career ==
After having been a passenger on the first train into London, Wilson founded Railway Magazine, the first railway-themed trade journal.

In 1848 Wilson wrote and published a pamphlet entitled A House for Shakespeare in which he proposed the creation of a national theatre company. This inspired the foundation of the Royal National Theatre. His proposal was supported by Henry Irving, Charles Dickens and Matthew Arnold among others.

== Works by radicals ==
A strong advocate of freedom of the press, Wilson published material which other publishers found too politically dangerous.

- Church-of-Englandism and its Catechism Examined, 1818, by Jeremy Bentham. His utilitarian views were shared by Wilson.
- The Elements of the Art of Packing, as Applied to Special Juries, 1821, by Jeremy Bentham.
- The Black Book, or Corruption Unmasked! Being an Account of Persons, Places, and Sinecures, 1820–1823, 2 vols. by John Wade. Later edition as The Extraordinary Black Book.
- Report of the Trial of John Barkley, 1822, transcript edited by Matthew Davenport Hill.
- Remarks on the consumption of public wealth by the clergy of every Christian nation, and particularly by the Established Church in England and Wales, and in Ireland; with a plan for altering its revenues, subject to existing interests, etc., 1822, anonymous, printed by Rushton and Melling, Liverpool. Taken by Francis Thackeray to be a reply to his A Defence of the Clergy of the Church of England of May 1822; he returned to the subject in Some Observations etc. (1823).
- A Fragment on Government, 2nd edition 1823, by Jeremy Bentham, co-published with W. Pickering.
- Thoughts on Man, 1831, by William Godwin. This work, not much regarded at the time, had been rejected by nine publishers.

Other publications included works by Benjamin Disraeli and Robert Owen.

== Poetry ==
Wilson published poetry, and was the publisher of the first free-standing works of both Alfred, Lord Tennyson and Robert Browning.

- Three Poems, Not Included in the Works of Lord Byron: Lines to lady J-, The Ænigma, The Curse of Minerva, 1818. Of these, The Ænigma is attributed to Catherine Fanshawe rather than Lord Byron.
- Poems, Chiefly Lyrical, 1830, by Alfred Tennyson. It contained "Claribel", "The Kraken", "The Dying Swan" and "Mariana", which later were among Tennyson's most celebrated poems. The publication brought Tennyson to the notice of Samuel Taylor Coleridge, among others. The business relationship was uneasy, however, and Tennyson came to feel that Wilson's reputation as a philosophical radical had affected his own adversely. Robert Bernard Martin reconstructs the circumstances, suggesting that Arthur Hallam found Wilson as willing to publish the book, if paid, and tried to keep the financial support he and possibly other friends of Tennyson had supplied secret. His main source is the 1906 book on the Cambridge Apostles by Frances Brookfield, by her marriage to Charles Brookfield connected to a cousin of Hallam.
- Paracelsus, 1835, by Robert Browning. Alexandra Orr later concluded that Wilson had agreed to publish the work, the costs being covered by Browning's father, out of sympathy with the radical views of William Johnson Fox and the poet. They had first tried Edward Moxon, who grumbled that Tennyson was not selling well, and Saunders & Otley, without success.

Wilson also published Thomas Campbell and was an original publisher of William Hazlitt.

== Translations ==
- The Hunchback of Notre-Dame by Victor Hugo, 1831 (3 vols.)

General Lafayette sent Wilson a bust of himself and an autographed letter after he published one of his works in translation in London.

== Death ==
He died on 9 June 1868 and was buried on the western side of Highgate Cemetery. His grave (no.10581) no longer has a legible inscription.

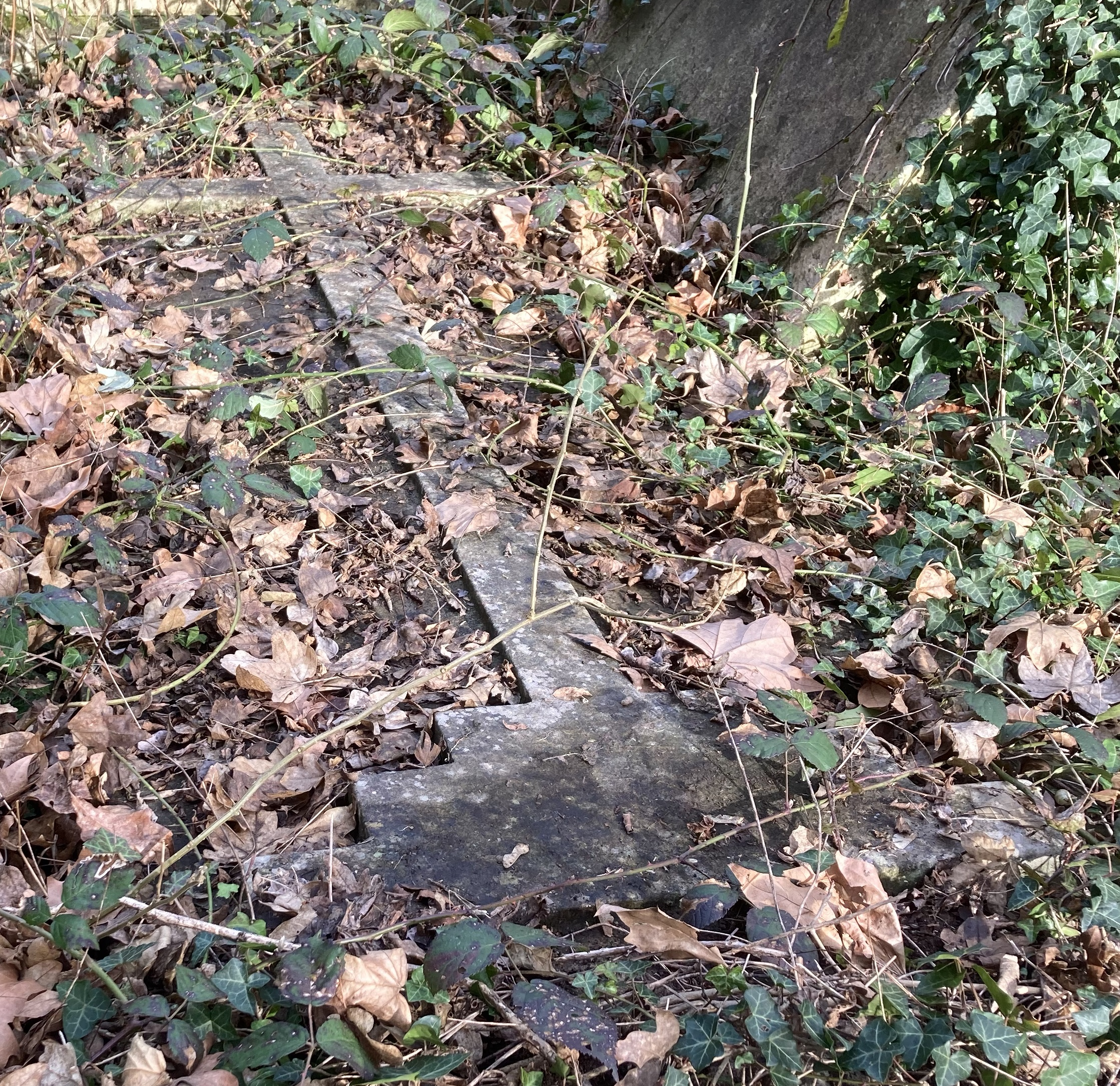
Grave of Effingham Wilson in Highgate Cemetery

The obituary for Wilson in The Hornet said: "at the present time the firm of Effingham Wilson is known throughout the world as one of the foremost houses in the publishing trade." Walter Bagehot, a close personal friend wrote that Wilson "was full of amenity, kindness and cheerfulness. He enjoyed excellent health throughout his long life, and used often to remark that he had lived sixty years in London without a headache." He was a close personal friend of George Birkbeck. His correspondences included John Stuart Mill and Charles Dickens.

== Family ==
Wilson was twice married, and had a large number of children. He married, firstly in 1804, Martha Hunt. After her death, he married secondly, in 1822, Maria James. The firm was continued by his son Henry Schütz Wilson (born 1824), being taken over by Isaac Pitman in 1932; which was taken over in turn by Pearson plc.

The third son of the second marriage, William Wilson (c.1826–1886), went into the family firm as a young man. He is known as a poet (Gathered together: poems 1860), which included sonnets on contemporary celebrities. He is also credited with the neologism "science-fiction" in 1851, in a book A Little Earnest Book upon a Great Old Subject, while discussing the poetry of Richard Henry Horne.
