= Yang Wan (Gējì) =

Chinese Ming Dynasty singer and calligrapher

- 楊宛
- Born: c. 1602
- Died: 1644; Beijing
- Occupations: courtesan, Poet
- Spouse: Mao Yuanyi
- Writing career
- Pen name: Yang Wanshu (楊宛叔)
- Language: Chinese

Yang Wan (c. 1602–1644; simplified Chinese: 杨宛; traditional Chinese: 楊宛; pinyin: Yáng Wǎn, courtesy name: Wǎnshū 宛叔) was one of the famous courtesan poets of the Qinhuai pleasure district in Nanjing during the waning years of the Ming dynasty.

== Biography ==
Yang Wan's family background is unknown. According to Mao Yuanyi's preface to Yang Wan's first poetry collection, Zhōngshān Xiàn (鍾山獻), she was born around 1602. However, in Mao Yuanyi's prefaces he describes that Yang Wan had learned under his guidance which contradicts other sources that describe Yang Wan as having already developed a reputation as a painter, poet, calligrapher prior to marrying Mao Yuanyi. As a courtesan brought up in the Qinhuai Pleasure District, Yang Wan was likely trained in the arts from a young age.

Yang Wan developed a close bond with another courtesan, Wang Wei, who would become a highly regarded poet and travel writer. They called each other sworn sisters. Wang Wei's poems to Yang Wan indicate they had a close relationship. The courtesan of the pleasure district along the Qinhuai River were especially celebrated for their sophistication, refinement, and literary and artistic accomplishments. Qian Qianyi wrote that Liu Rushi, Wang Wei, and Yang Wan were the three most talented and refined beauties under heaven.

Yang Wan and Wang Wei both became concubines of the military official and scholar Mao Yuanyi. Mao Yuanyi, who was also a poet, valued his concubine's artistic achievements and pursuits. Wang Wei's time as Mao Yuanyi's concubine was short, as Wang Wei ran away from the household because she felt that Mao Yuanyi favored Yang Wan. Courtesans who got married were expected to quit their profession and observe the private lifestyles expected from respectable wives, but Yang Wan had an unusual arrangement with her husband to continue her professional pursuits. She had various lovers during their marriage, with her husband's knowledge and tolerance.

Mao Yuanyi suffered a political fall and exile, which led him to excessive drinking. He died in 1640. Wang Wei remarried, and Yang Wan continued her profession. Four years later, she eloped with an officer of the Embroidered Uniform Guard, Tian Hongyu, father of the imperial concubine Tian Xiuying. Rather than helping her as she had suspected he would, Tian Hongyu instead treated her like a servant and had her instruct his daughter. When Tian Hongyu died, she tried to run away with Liu Dongping, but as they were about to depart, the city of Beijing came under occupation during the Jiashen Incident. Disguised as a peasant, Yang Wan is said to have attempted to sneak her way back to Nanjing, but was killed by bandits on the way.

== Poetry ==
Yang Wan is known to have wrote four volumes of "Zhongshan Xian (钟山献)", one volume of "Xuji (续集)" and one volume of "Zaixu (再续)", which were compiled in chronological order by her husband Mao Yuanyi. Despite her fame during her lifetime, in the early Qing Dynasty a backlash against women's cultivation of artistic skills and the decadence associated with the courtesan profession caused Yang Wan and her work to be disparaged. Consequently, very few of her poems survived.

夢

悠悠清夜月
寂寂眠闌干
惟有夢來去
不言行[...]難

Translation:

Dreams

In the languid light of the night moon,
A quiet sleep closes the rim of the eyes.
Other than the dreams that come and go,
No word or motion […] troubles.

— Translated by Carolanna Lisonbee

== See also ==
- Chen Yuanyuan
- Chinese poetry
- Eight Beauties of Qinhuai
- Liu Rushi
- Wang Wei (Gējì)
