= Wan Weixing =

Chinese space physicist (1958–2020)

- 万卫星

Member of the Standing Committee of the National People's Congress (13th)
- In office March 2018 – 20 May 2020
- Chairman: Li Zhanshu

Delegate to the National People's Congress (12th)
- In office March 2013 – March 2018
- Chairman: Zhang Dejiang
- Constituency: Hubei

Personal details
- Born: July 1, 1958 Tianmen, Hubei, China
- Died: May 20, 2020 (aged 61) Beijing, China
- Party: Jiusan Society
- Scientific career
- Education: Wuhan University
- Fields: Space physics
- Workplaces: Institute of Geology and Geophysics, Chinese Academy of Sciences

Chinese name
- Traditional Chinese: 萬衛星
- Simplified Chinese: 万卫星
Transcriptions
Standard Mandarin
- Hanyu Pinyin: Wàn Wèixīng

Wan Weixing (Chinese: 万卫星; 1 July 1958 – 20 May 2020) was a Chinese space physicist. He was a member of the Jiusan Society. He was an academician of the Chinese Academy of Sciences (CAS).

== Biography ==
Wan was born in Tianmen, Hubei, on July 1, 1958. After the resumption of National College Entrance Examination in 1977, he was accepted to Wuhan University, where he majored in physics. He received his master's degree from Wuhan Institute of Physics, Chinese Academy of Sciences under the supervision of academician Li Jun (李钧) in 1984. In 1989, he earned his doctor's degree from the institute and joined the institute as a researcher. In 2004, the Institute of Geology and Geophysics set up the Department of Geomagnetism and Space Physics in Beijing, he became its first director. He was a delegate to the 12th National People's Congress. On March 18, 2018, he was elected a Standing Committee member of the 13th National People's Congress. On May 20, 2020, he died of an illness in Beijing, aged 62.

== Honours and awards ==
- 1995 National Science Fund for Distinguished Young Scholars
- 2011 Member of the Chinese Academy of Sciences (CAS)
