= John Wade (author) =

British journalist and author

John Wade (1788–1875) was a British journalist and writer, connected with the press throughout his career. He contributed to many periodicals, and was a leader-writer on The Spectator when that journal was under Robert Stephen Rintoul's editorship between 1828 and 1858.

== Life ==
In early life Wade worked for at least a decade as a wool-sorter. Encouraged by Francis Place and others, he took up journalism in London, initially from 1818 editing the Gorgon. Writing never made him much money, and his main income in his later years was a civil-list pension of £50, granted to him on 19 June 1862 by Lord Palmerston, mainly on the representations of the publisher Effingham Wilson.

Wade was a vice-president of the historical section of the Institution d'Afrique of Paris. He died at Chelsea on 29 September 1875, and was buried in Kensal Green cemetery on 2 October.

== Works ==
As an author Wade's major success was The Black Book, or Corruption Unmasked! Being an Account of Persons, Places, and Sinecures, 1820–3, 2 vols. Published by Effingham Wilson, and brought out when the reform excitement was commencing, it produced a considerable sensation, and fifty thousand copies were sold. With some alterations in the title, it was reproduced in 1831, 1832, and 1835.

In 1826 he wrote for Longmans The Cabinet Lawyer: a Popular Digest of the Laws of England, the twenty-fifth edition of which appeared in 1829. Another popular work was British History, chronologically arranged, 1839; supplement 1841; 3rd edit. 1844; 5th edit. 1847. Effingham Wilson paid Wade a weekly salary for years while he was compiling it, and supplied him with works of reference.

Wade also edited an annotated Junius, including Letters by the same Writer under other signatures, (1850, in Bohn's "Standard Library", 2 vols.). Here he was out of his depth, and the imperfections of his edition, and especially of his introduction, were pointed out by Charles W. Dilke in the ‘Athenæum’ of 2 Feb. et seq.
