= Megan Williams (author) =

Canadian born writer (born 1984)

- Born: June 30, 1984 (age 41); Vancouver, BC
- Occupations: CEO, Author
- Years active: 2014–present
- Children: 2
- Parent(s): Brenda Williams, Tony Williams

Megan Asha Williams (born June 30, 1984) is a Canadian born writer. Williams published her first book, Our Interrupted Fairy Tale in February 2014, a non-fiction book based on the diaries of her boyfriend, Chad Warren (February 11, 1975 - November 28, 2009) who died from an incurable blood cancer, multiple myeloma.

Williams published two children's books (Don’t Call the Office, 2016, I Don’t Want To, 2018) with her stepdaughter, Madison Reaveley.

In January 2017, Williams started The Self Publishing Agency Inc. (TSPA), based in Vancouver, Canada.

Williams and TSPA has published award-winning books for TV and media personalities such as Michael Johnson (The Bachelorette ABC) Making the Love You Want, 2020, Kendall Long (The Bachelor, ABC), Just Curious: A notebook for questions, 2021 Kelley Wolf (The Real World New Orleans), FLOW: Finding Love Over Worry, 2022, Katie Bieksa, Newport Jane, 2017 CEDAR, 2022.

Williams married Brad Watt in 2016. They have two daughters.

== Biography ==
Williams was born and raised in New Westminster, British Columbia and graduated from New Westminster Secondary School in 2002. Following high school, Williams attended the University of Wyoming on a Tennis Scholarship. In 2005 Williams transferred schools to Jacksonville University where she finished her bachelor's degree while playing on the Women's Tennis Team (Div. 1) in the Atlantic Sun Conference

While writing Our Interrupted Fairy Tale, Williams worked at the BC Transplant Society in Vancouver, British Columbia as a Communications Manager. Our Interrupted Fairy Tale is a non-fiction story told from both Williams' perspective and that of her late boyfriend, Chad Warren (February 11, 1975 - November 28, 2009). The memoir is a collection of Chad's diary and blog entries, and letters, cards and emails exchanged between the two during their courtship and Warren's battle with the incurable blood cancer, Multiple Myeloma. The book sold hundreds of copies in the first weeks of its launch in British Columbia, presumably due to the TV, radio and newspaper publicity she received (see references). On April 26, 2014, Williams attended her first American book-signing at Barnes & Noble, Seattle. According to her blog, Williams sold out her inventory in less than two hours.
