= Gwynn Murrill =

American sculptor (born 1942)

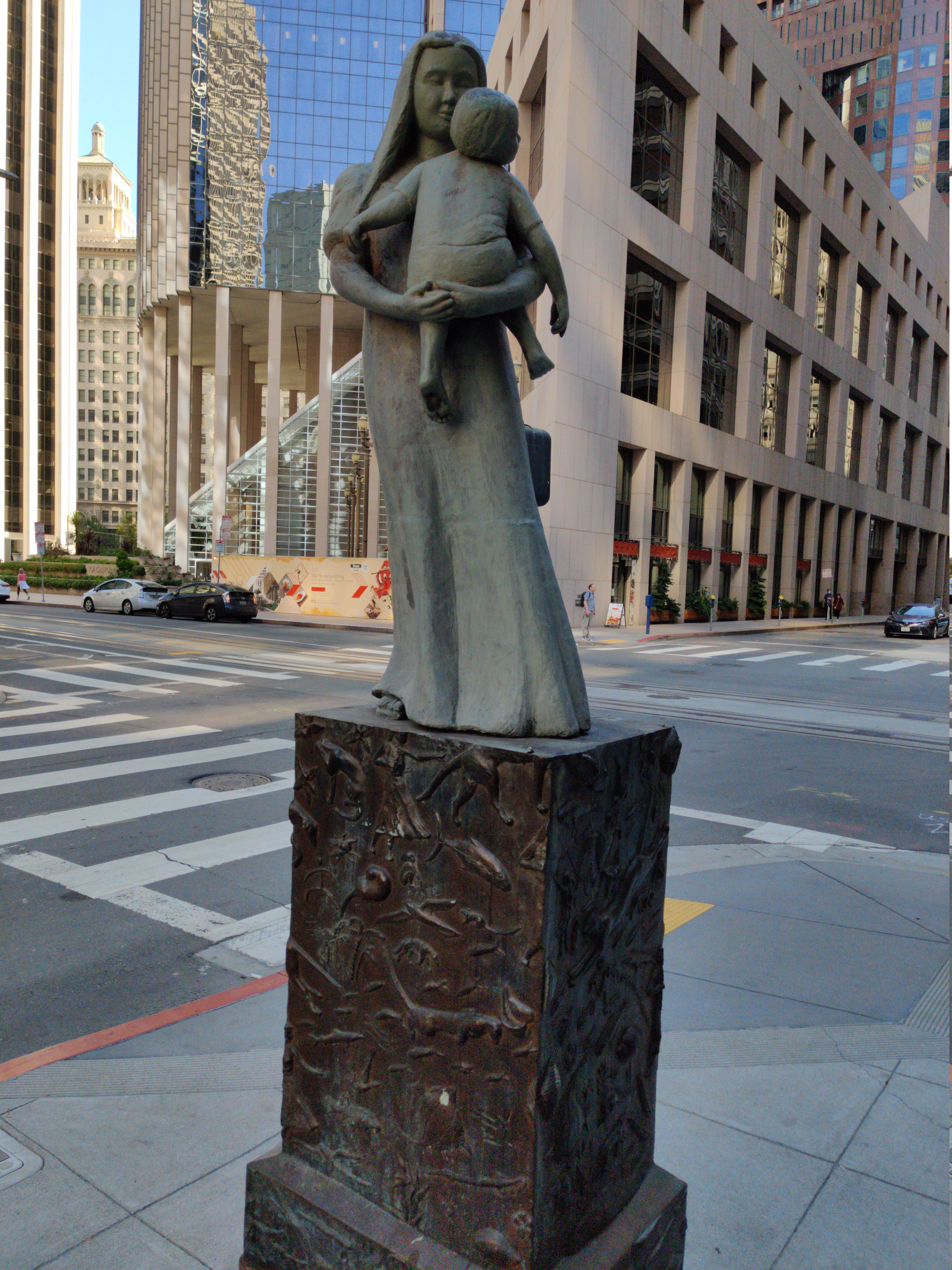
The Hawaiians (Mother and Child), by Gwynn Murrill

Gwynn Murrill (born 1942) is an American sculptor.

A native of Ann Arbor, Michigan, Murrill earned her Master of Fine Arts degree at the University of California, Los Angeles. She is known most especially for her animal sculptures in a variety of media. In 1986 she received a Guggenheim Fellowship; she received a grant from the National Endowment for the Arts in 1984 and 1985, a Rome Prize in 1979 and 1980, and a new talent purchase award from the Los Angeles County Museum of Art, which is among the organizations owning examples of her work.
