= Regina Webb =

American children's book author (born 1990)

Regina Webb (born March 15) is an American children's book author. Most of her books focus on kids, nature and animals. Webb has been recognized as a psychology enthusiast and studied in this field until becoming a published author.

Her books have been known to help children's learning progress over a select series. Teachers have identified her as an author who can connect with kids. Her books have been nominated for many Reading Choice Awards. Webb is proud to have been born and raised in Kentucky and concurs with Kentucky Reading Association (KRA) in their involvement with promoting reading for all. She also participates in the Kentucky Women Writers Conference. Webb also has a noted compassion for children and contributes to St. Jude Children's Research Hospital and Cystic Fibrosis Foundation to support children's health.

== Selected works ==
- Detective Henry Hopper: Something's Wrong With My Dog
- Bullying and Your Children. Be a Verb...Take Action!
- Whatcha Thinking?: Cognitive Psychology: Mind, Personality, Behavior
