= Stephanie Grace Whitson =

American novelist

- Born: 1952 (age 72–73); East St. Louis, Illinois, U.S.
- Occupation: French teacher, novelist
- Genre: Historical Fiction, Fiction, Christian

Stephanie Grace Whitson (born 1952) is an American writer of historical fiction. A native of southern Illinois, she has lived in Nebraska, United States, since 1975. She began what she calls "playing with imaginary friends" (writing fiction) when, as a result of teaching her four homeschooled children Nebraska history, she was encouraged and challenged by the lives of pioneer women in the West.

Since her first book, Walks the Fire, was published in 1995, Stephanie's fiction titles have appeared on the ECPA bestseller list numerous times and been finalists for the Christy Award, the Inspirational Reader's Choice Award, and ForeWord's Book of the Year. Her first non-fiction work, How to Help a Grieving Friend, was released in 2005.

Her interests include pioneer women's history, antique quilts, and French, Italian, and Hawaiian language and culture.

== Books ==
- Prairie Winds series
  - Walks The Fire (1995)
  - Soaring Eagle (1996)
  - Red Bird (1997)
- Keepsake Legacies series
  - Sarah's Patchwork (1998)
  - Karyn's Memory Box (1999)
  - Nora's Ribbon Of Memories (1999)
- Dakota Moons series
  - Valley Of The Shadow (2000) (Christy Award finalist)
  - Edge Of The Wilderness (2001) (Christy Award finalist)
  - Heart Of The Sandhills (2002)
- Pine Ridge Portraits series
  - Secrets On The Wind (2003)
  - Watchers On The Hill (2004)
  - Footprints On The Horizon (2005)
- How To Help A Grieving Friend (2005)
- A Garden In Paris (2005)
- A Hilltop In Tuscany (2006) (sequel to A Garden In Paris)
- Jacob's List (2007)
- Women of the West series
  - Unbridled Dreams (2008)
- A patchwork love, part of A patchwork Christmas collection
