= Joseph Bertiers =

Kenyan painter and sculptor (born 1963)

Joseph Mbatia Bertiers
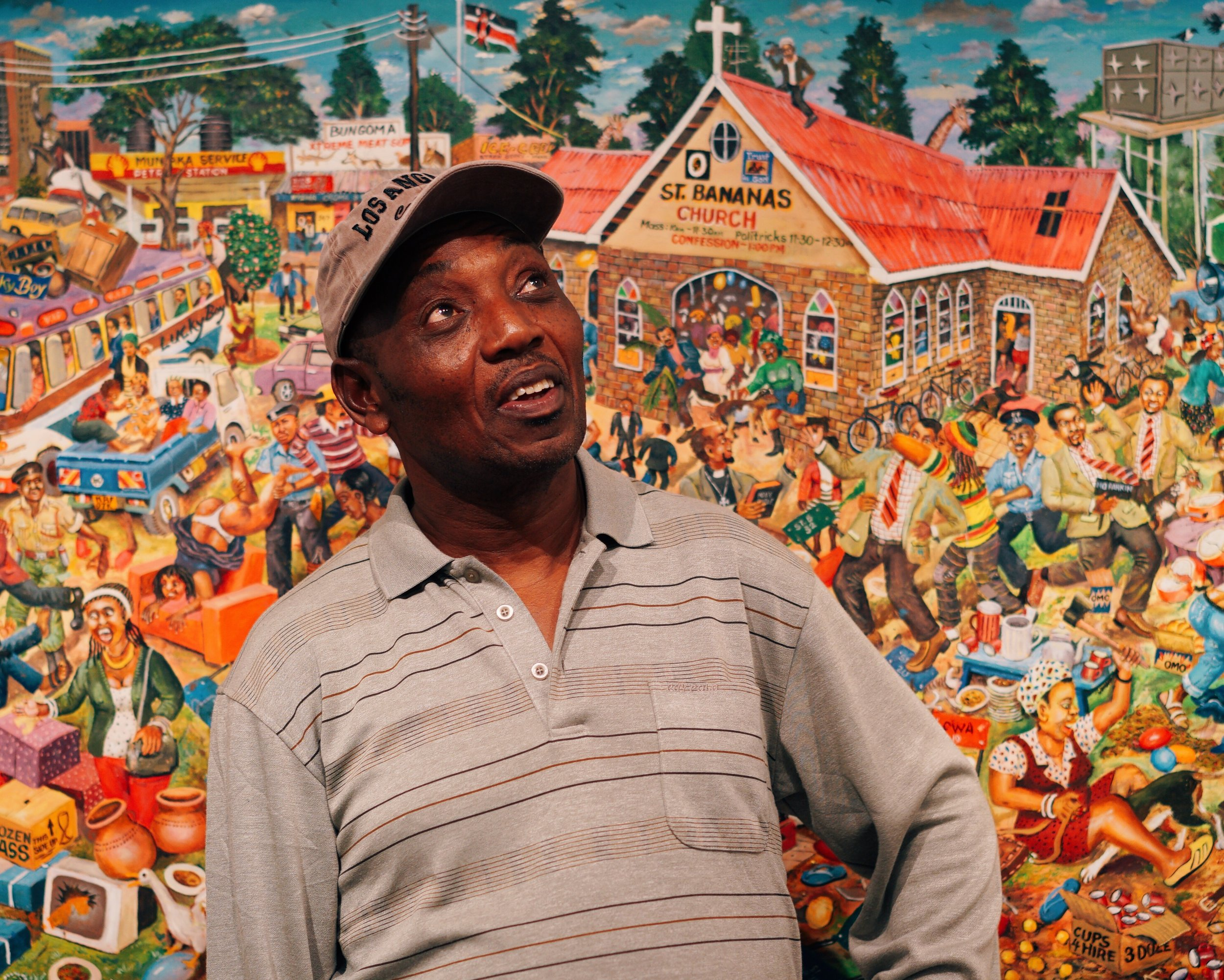
- Joseph Bertiers, in front of his own artwork, 2016
- Born: 1963 (age 62–63); Kenya
- Occupation: Painter

Joseph Mbatia Bertiers (born 1963) is a Kenyan painter and sculptor. He is best known for his imaginative depictions of political history and life-size scrap metal sculptures.

In 2006, Bertiers was selected to participate in Dak’Art and won first prize at a national competition for contemporary art organized by Alliance Française and the Goethe-Institut in Nairobi. His artwork has been exhibited across Africa, Europe, and North America.

== Education ==
Joseph studied at the YMCA Craft Training Centre and began working as a sign writer.

== Career ==
He began his artistic career at the age of 18, he painted signs for local bars, butchers and beauty parlors. He created a character called “Mr. No Credit”, designed to discourage customers from asking for free services.
