= Alf Kjetil Walgermo =

Norwegian journalist and writer

Alf Kjetil Walgermo (born 1977) is a Norwegian writer and former chairman of the Norwegian Critics' Association. He has often written on Christian subjects and served as cultural editor of the moderate Christian paper Vårt Land.
