= Tan Yuanchun =

Tan Yuanchun (譚元春/谭元春, 1586-1637, courtesy name Tan Youxia 譚友夏) was a prolific late-Ming scholar from Hubei. Tan Yuanchun's work remains as an important resource for modern scholars. He was an influential and best-selling author critic. Tan is known as one of the "Ming masters of close textual reading".

From 1614 Tan Yuanchun collaborated with his friend Zhong Xing on a bestselling poetry anthology Gu shigui (Models of ancient poetry), published around 1617, in three colours, with Zhong's and Tan's comments differentiated by colour. Tan Yuanchun's work remains as an important resource for modern scholars.

== See also ==
- Wang Wei (courtesan)
