= Henry Schütz Wilson =

Henry Schütz Wilson (15 September 1824 – 7 May 1902) was an English writer, literary critic, and mountaineer.

== Life ==
He was born in London, son of Effingham Wilson, a radical publisher and bookseller.

After education at a private school in Highgate, Schütz Wilson worked for ten years in a commercial house in London, and mastered French, German, and Italian. He was later the assistant secretary of the Electric Telegraph Company, and retired on a pension when the business was taken over by the Post Office in 1870. He edited the Journal of the Society of Telegraph Engineers from 1872.

Wilson divided his leisure between foreign travel or mountaineering, and study or criticism of foreign literature and history. An admirer of Goethe's work, he published Count Egmont as depicted in Fancy, Poetry, and History in 1863. In later years he wrote frequently in London magazines, and reissued his articles in Studies and Romances (1873), Studies in History, Legend, and Literature (1884), and History and Criticism (1886). He was an early admirer of Edward FitzGerald's translations from the Persian, and FitzGerald welcomed Wilson's encouragement. Interested in both the English and the German stage, he was popular in literary and artistic society.

Wilson's three novels, The Three Paths, The Voyage of the Lady (1860), and Philip Mannington (1874), were translated into German.

He was a member of the Alpine Club from 1871 to 1898; he ascended the Matterhorn on 26–27 August 1875 with Frederic Morshead and A. D. Prickard, and on 15 August 1876 with Morshead. Melchior Anderegg was one of Wilson's guides, and he wrote "Anderegg as a Sculptor" in the Alpine Journal (November 1873). He collected his experiences in Alpine Ascents and Adventures (1878). He was also a capable fencer.

He died in London on 7 May 1902. He was unmarried.
