= Zhong Xing =

Zhong Xing (鐘惺/钟惺，1574-1625) was a late-Ming scholar. "He never rose beyond a minor official position but was a best-selling critic of poetry." He became the founder of the Jingling school of poetry, which valued originality over imitation.

From 1614 Zhong collaborated with his friend Tan Yuanchun on a bestselling poetry anthology Gu shigui [Models of ancient poetry], published around 1617 in three colours, with Zhong's and Tan's comments differentiated by colour. He also published notes on history (Shihuai, The memory of history) in seventeen juan, and edited a 1620 anthology of Su Shi's writings. He is credited with the editorship of the Mingyuan shigui （名媛詩歸/名媛诗归）[Poetic retrospective of famous ladies], c. 1626, a comprehensive anthology of women writers.
