= Azy (orangutan) =

Hybrid orangutan (born 1977)

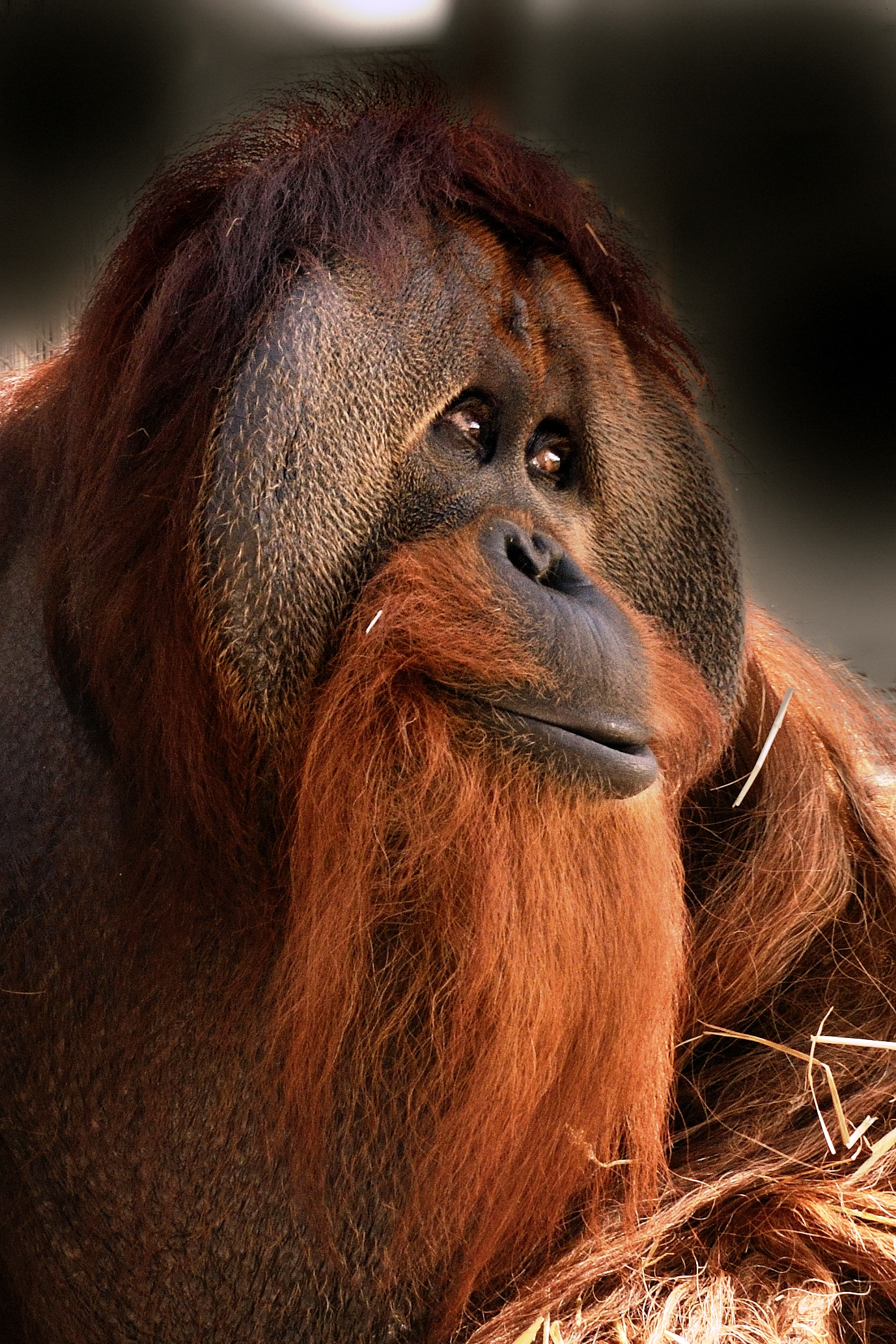
- Azy in 2011 at the Indianapolis Zoo.
- Species: Orangutan
- Sex: Male
- Born: 14 December 1977 (age 48); National Zoological Park (United States)
- Weight: 113.3 kg (250 lb)
- Height: 1.52 m (5 ft 0 in)

Azy (pronounced AY-zee), is a male hybrid orangutan. He was born on December 14, 1977, at the National Zoo in Washington, D.C. He was transferred to the Albuquerque Zoo in 1978, and returned to the National Zoo in 1980.

In 1995, Azy began living at the Think Tank building and participating in the Zoo's Orangutan Language Project with Rob Shumaker. On September 28, 2004, Azy was moved to the Great Ape Trust of Iowa.

In 2010, he was moved to the Indianapolis Zoo where he resides with five other orangutans from the Great Ape Trust, where Shumaker serves as President of Indianapolis Zoo. In 2014, Azy was said to be the leader of the pack, weighing 113.3 kg (250 lb), standing 1.52 m (5 ft 0 in) tall and with arms spanning over 2.74 m (9 ft 0 in).

== See also ==
- List of individual apes
