= National Zoological Park (United States) =

Zoo in Washington, D.C., and Front Royal, Virginia

Smithsonian's National Zoo and Conservation Biology Institute
- Front entrance
- Interactive map of Smithsonian's National Zoo and Conservation Biology Institute
- 38°55′52″N 77°02′59″W
- Date opened: May 6, 1889; 137 years ago
- Location: 3001 Connecticut Ave. NW, Rock Creek Park, Washington, D.C., U.S.
- Land area: Zoo: 163 acres (66 ha); SCBI: 3,200-acre (1,300 ha)
- No. of animals: Zoo: 2,000; SCBI: 30–40 endangered species
- No. of species: 400
- Annual visitors: 1.8 million (2019)
- Memberships: AZA
- Major exhibits: Amazonia, American Trail, Asia Trail, Bird House, Giant Panda Habitat, Great Ape House, Kids' Farm, Reptile Discovery Center, Small Mammal House, & Think Tank.
- Public transit: Washington Metro at Cleveland Park or Woodley Park
- Website: nationalzoo.si.edu

The Smithsonian's National Zoo and Conservation Biology Institute, commonly known as the National Zoological Park or simply the National Zoo, is one of the oldest zoos in the United States. The zoo is part of the Smithsonian Institution and does not charge admission. Founded in 1889, its mission is to "provide engaging experiences with animals and create and share knowledge to save wildlife and habitats".

The National Zoo has two campuses. The first is a 163-acre (66 ha) urban park located at Rock Creek Park in the Woodley Park neighborhood of Northwest Washington, D.C., 20 minutes from the National Mall by MetroRail. The other campus is the 3,200-acre (1,300 ha) Smithsonian Conservation Biology Institute (SCBI; formerly known as the Conservation and Research Center) in Front Royal, Virginia. On this land, there are 180 species of trees, 850 species of woody shrubs and herbaceous plants, 40 species of grasses, and 36 different species of bamboo. The SCBI is a non-public facility devoted to training wildlife professionals in conservation biology and to propagating rare species through natural means and assisted reproduction. The National Zoo is accredited by the Association of Zoos and Aquariums (AZA).

The two facilities host about 2,700 animals of 390 different species. About one-fifth of them are endangered or threatened. Most species are on exhibit at the Rock Creek Park campus. The zoo is home to birds, great apes, big cats, Asian elephants, insects, amphibians, reptiles, aquatic animals, small mammals and many more, but the best-known residents are giant pandas. The SCBI facility houses between 30 and 40 endangered species at any given time depending on research needs and recommendations from the zoo and the conservation community. The zoo was one of the first to establish a scientific research program. Because it is a part of the Smithsonian Institution, the National Zoo receives federal appropriations for operating expenses. A new master plan for the park was introduced in 2008 to upgrade the park's exhibits and layout.

The National Zoo is open every day of the year except for December 25 (Christmas Day), though it was closed for a long period during the COVID-19 pandemic. The zoo reopened on May 21, 2021.

== History ==
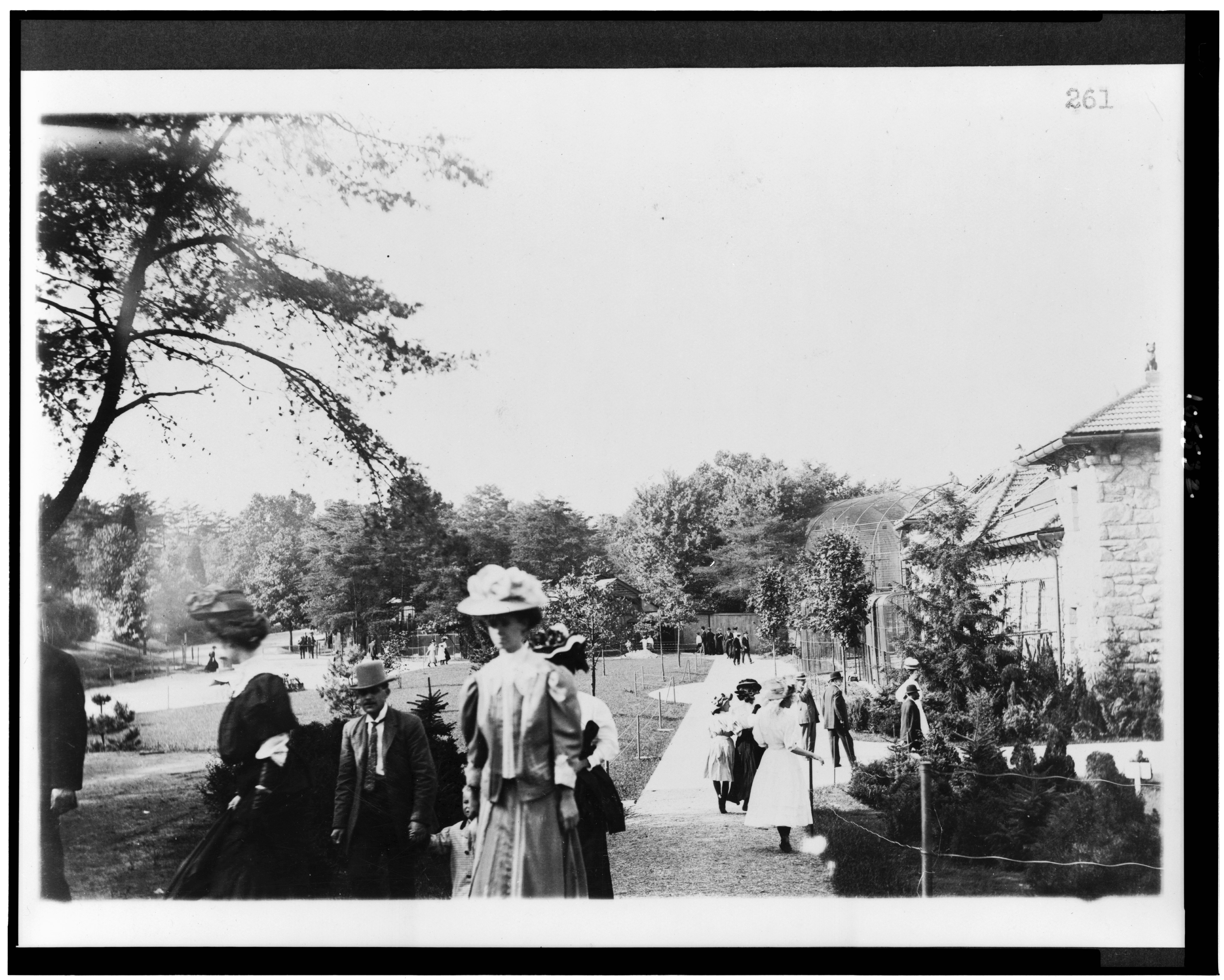
View at the National Zoo, Washington, D.C., 1909

The zoo first started as the National Museum's Department of Living Animals in 1886. By an act of Congress on March 2, 1889, for "the advancement of science and the instruction and recreation of the people", the National Zoo was created. In 1890, it became a part of the Smithsonian Institution. Three well-known individuals drew up plans for the zoo: Samuel Langley, third Secretary of the Smithsonian; William Temple Hornaday, noted conservationist and head of the Smithsonian's vertebrate division; and Frederick Law Olmsted, the premier landscape architect of his day. William T. Hornaday was the park's first director and curator of all 185 animals when the park was first opened and took office on May 6, 1889. Together, they designed a new zoo to exhibit animals for the public and to serve as a refuge for wildlife, such as bison and beaver, which were rapidly vanishing from North America. For the first several decades, however, the zoo was managed closely by anthropologist Dr. Frank Baker, who navigated the zoo through many challenges and enlisted the zoo in many cultural projects. For a thorough history of the zoo from the 1880s to 1920s, see Daniel Vandersommers's 2023 book Entangled Encounters at the National Zoo.

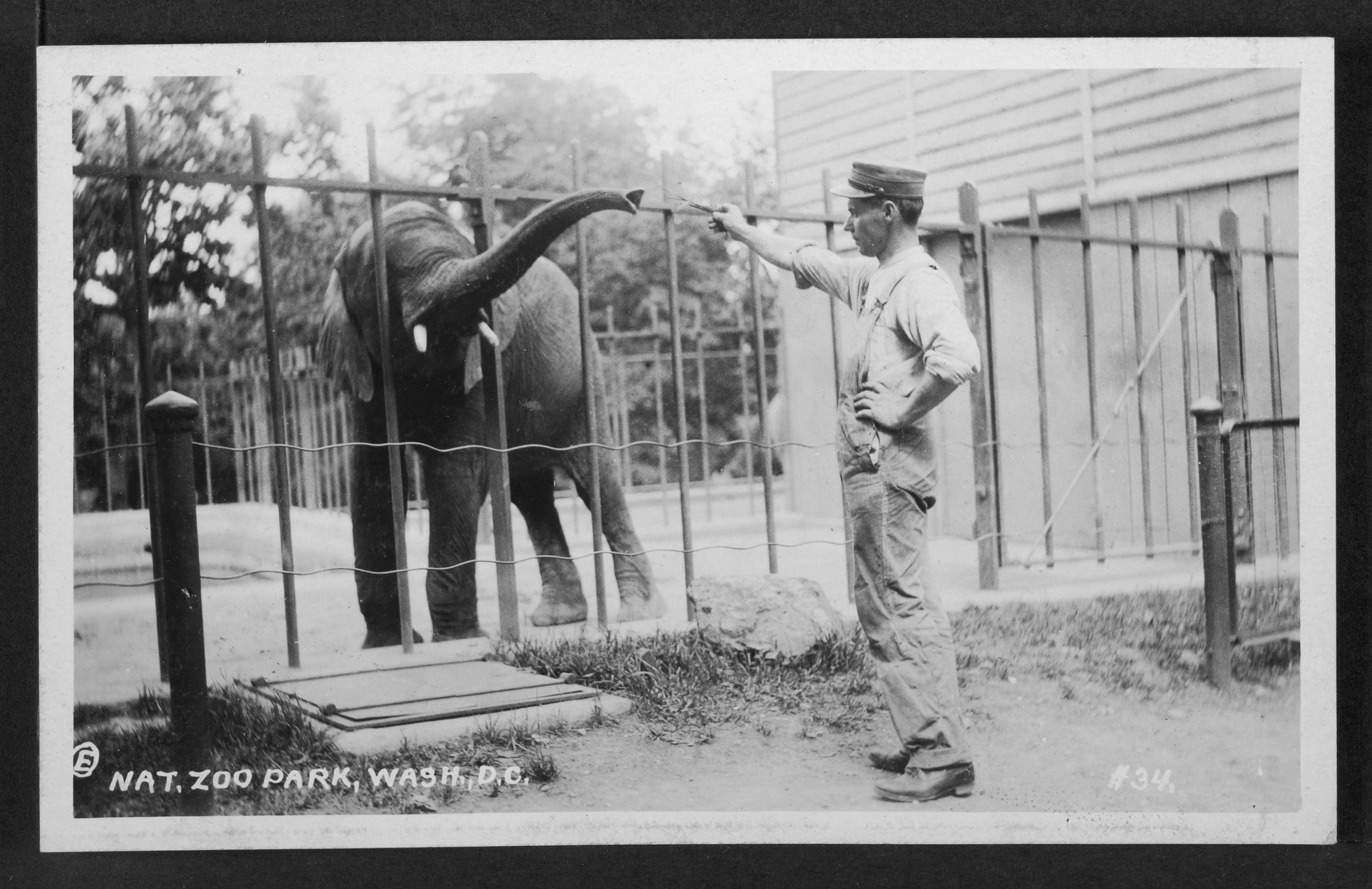
Elephant fed by a zoo attendant through the bars of a fence at the National Zoo in Washington, D.C., c. 1915

For the first 50 years, the National Zoo, like most zoos around the world, focused on exhibiting one or two representative exotic animal species. The number of many species in the wild began to decline drastically because of human activities. In 1899, the Kansas frontiersman Charles "Buffalo" Jones captured a bighorn sheep for the zoo. The fate of animals and plants became a pressing concern. Many of these species were favorite zoo animals, such as elephants and tigers; hence the staff began to concentrate on the long-term management and conservation of entire species.

Several exotic animals were donated by former US presidents; often they were acquired as gifts from foreign dignitaries. Notable among them are Billy the pygmy hippopotamus who is the common ancestor to almost all pygmy hippos in American zoos and Rebecca the raccoon, one of many exotic presidential pets of Calvin Coolidge and First Lady Grace.

In the mid-1950s, the zoo hired its first full-time permanent veterinarian, reflecting a priority placed on professional health care for the animals. In 1958, Friends of the National Zoo (FONZ) was founded. The citizen group's first accomplishment was to persuade Congress to fund the zoo's budget entirely through the Smithsonian; previously, the zoo's budget was divided between appropriations for the Smithsonian and the District of Columbia. Congressional funding placed the zoo on a firmer financial base, allowing for a period of growth and improvement. In 2006, Congress approved an additional $14.6 million for renovations in both facilities. FONZ incorporated as a nonprofit organization and turned its attention to developing education and volunteer programs, supporting these efforts from its operation of concessions at the zoo, and expanding community support for the zoo through a growing membership which annually raises between $4 million and $8 million for the zoo.

In the early 1960s, the zoo turned its attention to breeding and studying threatened and endangered species. Although some zoo animals had been breeding and raising young, it was not understood why some species did so successfully while others did not. In 1965, the zoo created the zoological research division to study the reproduction, behavior, and ecology of zoo species, and to learn how best to meet the needs of the animals.

The Ivy A. Pelzman Memorial Glockenspiel, constructed by the Petit & Fritsen bell foundry, is a 38-foot-tall clock tower standing at the zoo's southeastern entrance consisting of a carillon of 35 bells, four moving figurines of animals, and a 4-faced clock that was dedicated on May 16, 1976. It was designed and donated by the late Dr. Ivy A. Pelzman (1890–1970) as a memorial in honor of his wife Katherine. The glockenspiel's steam-engine powered rotating display of animals malfunctioned a few years after the glockenspiel's installation due to the steam engine becoming Inoperable. A few years later, the glockenspiel was relocated on the zoo grounds from Connecticut Avenue entrance to the southeastern entrance. The glockenspiel's bells became inoperable in 2003 due to a mechanical malfunction with the carillon keyboard console. The Smithsonian lists the glockenspiel as an "attractive, but dysfunctional gift," and it requires expensive funds for restoration and maintenance.

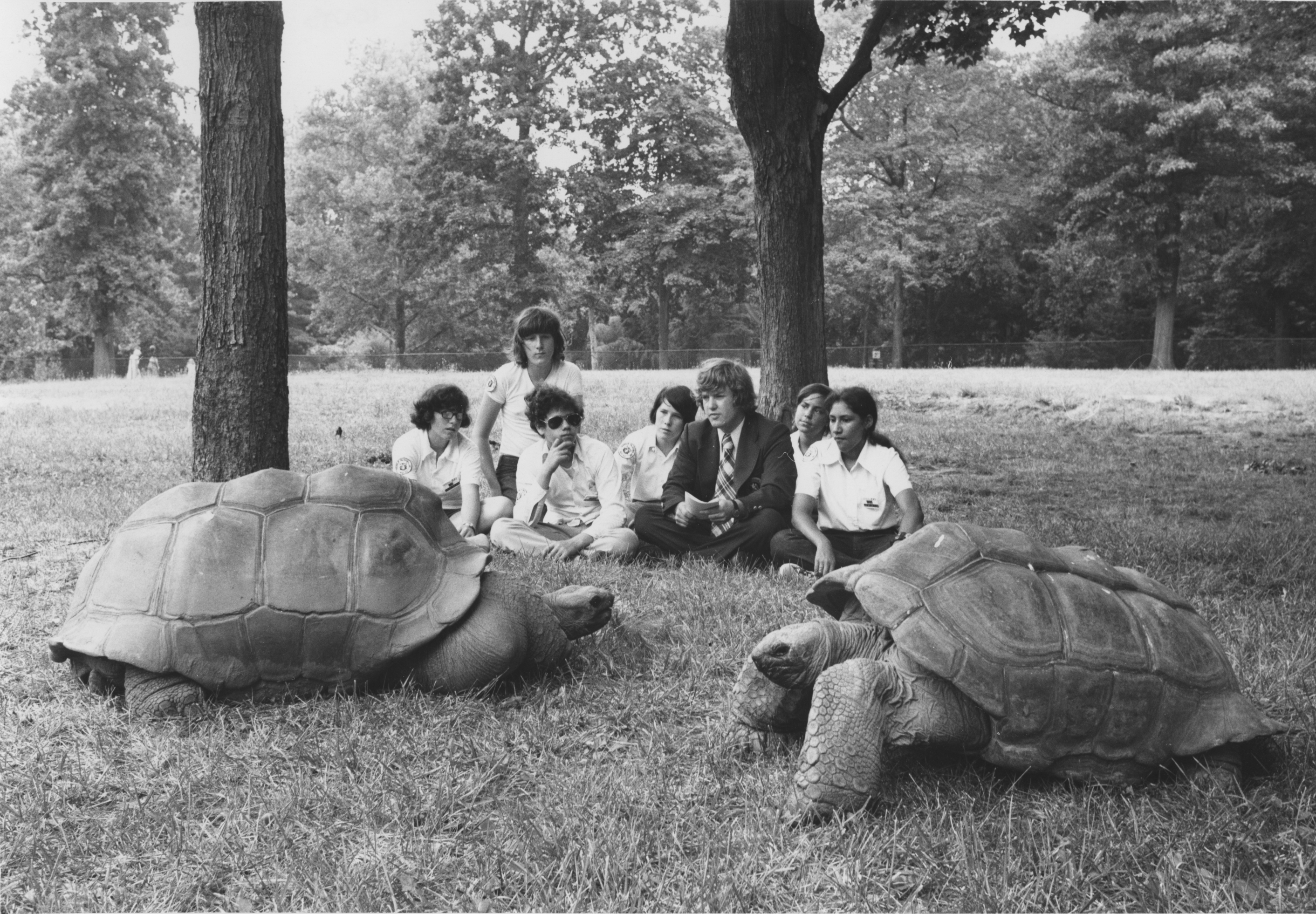
Tours and classes at the zoo, 1979

In 1975, the zoo established the Conservation and Research Center (CRC). In 2010, the complex was renamed the Smithsonian Conservation Biology Institute (SCBI), a title also used as an umbrella term for the scientific endeavors that take place on both campuses. On 3,200 acres (13 km^{2}) in the Virginia countryside, rare species, such as Mongolian wild horses, scimitar-horned oryx, maned wolves, cranes, and others live and breed in spacious surroundings. SCBI's modern efforts emphasize reproductive physiology, analysis of habitat and species relationships, genetics, husbandry and the training of conservation scientists.

In June 2003, the zoo's last pair of greater one-horned rhinos, Mohan and Mechi, were moved to the White Oak Conservation Center in Florida, in September 2006, the zoo's last giraffe, Randale, was transferred to the Lowry Park Zoo and in September 2009, the zoo's last hippopotamus, Happy, was transferred to the Milwaukee County Zoo to make space for Elephant Trails.

During the COVID-19 pandemic during 2020–21, the zoo was closed for several months as a precautionary effort.

== Modern status ==
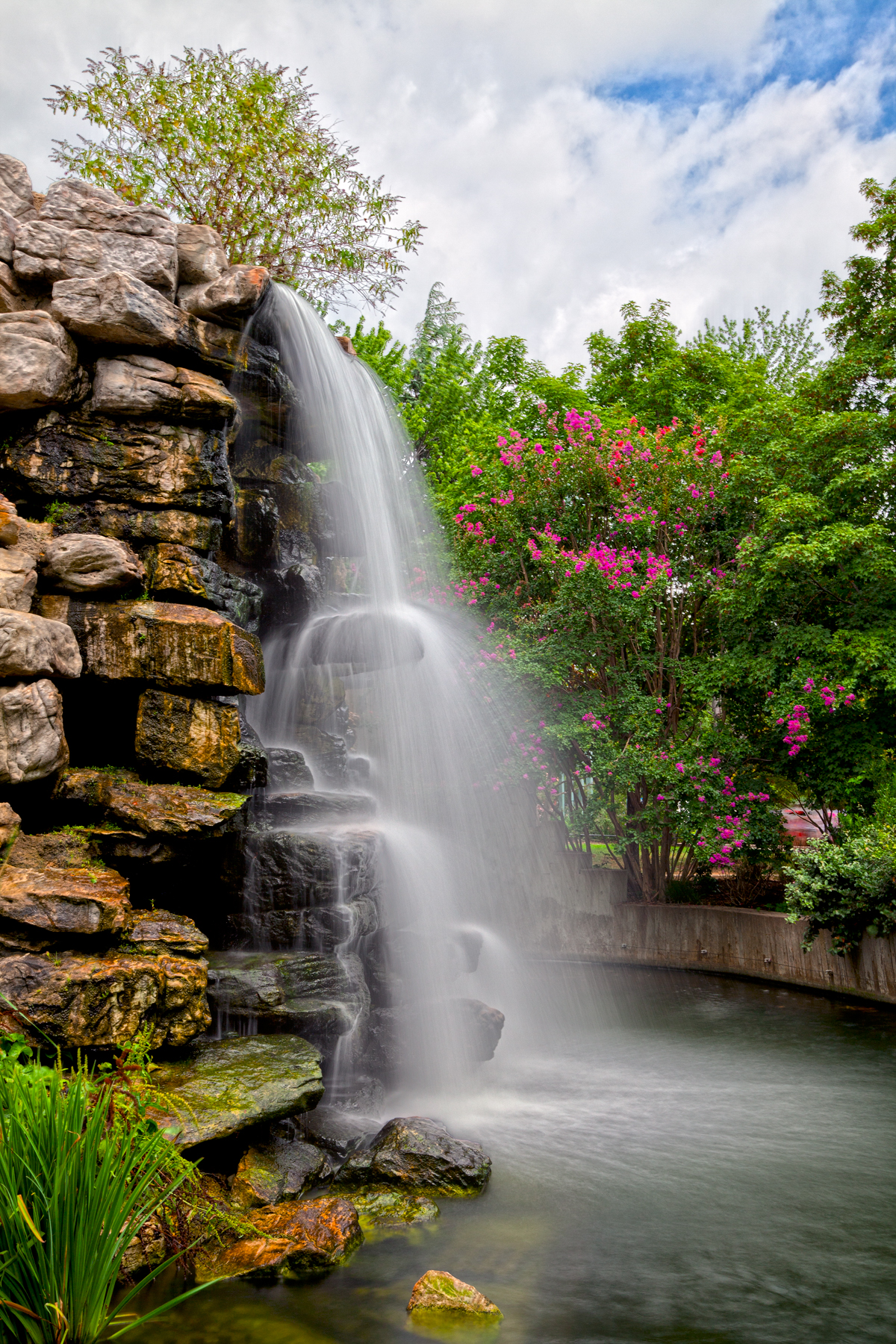
A waterfall in the zoo

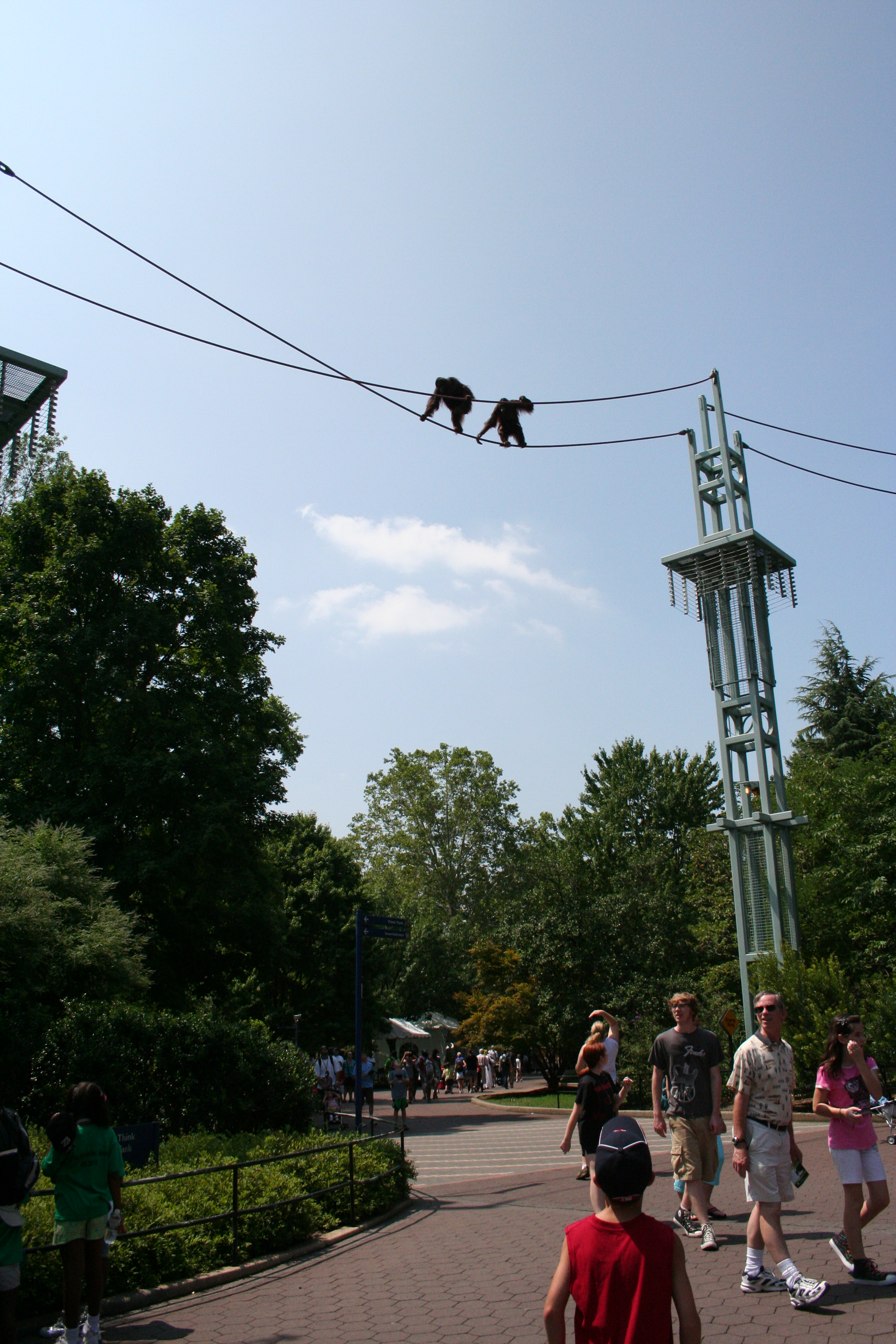
Two orangutans crossing over visitors via the "O Line"

Expanding knowledge about the needs of zoo animals and commitment to their well-being has changed the look of the National Zoo. Today, animals live in natural groupings rather than individually. Rare and endangered species, such as golden lion tamarins, Sumatran tigers, and sarus cranes, breed and raise their young – showing the success of the zoo's conservation and research programs. The zoo's research team studies animals both in the wild and at the zoo. Its research encompasses reproductive biology, conservation biology, biodiversity monitoring, veterinary medicine, nutrition, behavior, ecology, and bird migration.

The National Zoo has developed public-education programs to help students, teachers and families explore the intricacies of the animal world. The zoo also designed specialized programs to train wildlife professionals from around the world and to form a network to provide crucial support for international conservation. The National Zoo is at the forefront of the use of web technology and programming to expand its programs to an international virtual audience.

Plans for the future include modernizing the zoo's aging facilities and expanding its education, research and conservation efforts in Washington, Virginia and in the wild. As part of a 10-year renewal program, Asia Trail – a series of habitats for seven Asian species including sloth bears, red pandas, and clouded leopards – was created. Kids' Farm exhibit, opened in 2004, was slated for closure in 2011 but is to remain open for another 10 years following a donation to the exhibit. Elephant Trails, opened in 2013, provides a new home for the zoo's elephants.

The zoo, which is supported by tax revenues and open to everyone, attracts 2 million visitors per year, according to The Washington Post in 2005.

The National Zoo has a Federal Law Enforcement Agency deployed on its grounds: the National Zoological Park Police (NZPP), which consists of full-time Law Enforcement Officers. The NZPP is an agency that has been recognized by the United States Congress and is one of five original police agencies within the District of Columbia with full police powers. They work very closely with the Metropolitan Police Department, the United States Park Police, Department of State, Capital Police, Federal Bureau of Investigation, and the Department of Defense. The agency is considered the first line of defense in the event of any crisis.

Dennis W. Kelly was named director of the zoo on February 15, 2010, overseeing both campuses. Kelly succeeded John Berry, who was the National Zoo director for three years until February 2009, when he resigned to become the director of the U.S. Office of Personnel Management under the Obama Administration. Steven Monfort, the zoo's associate director for conservation and science, served as the acting director between February 2009 and February 2010. Kelly retired as the zoo's director in November 2017, and Steven Monfort was named acting director. In November, 2021, Brandie Smith was appointed director. Smith is the second woman to serve as director in the zoo's 132-year history.

=== National Zoological Park Police ===
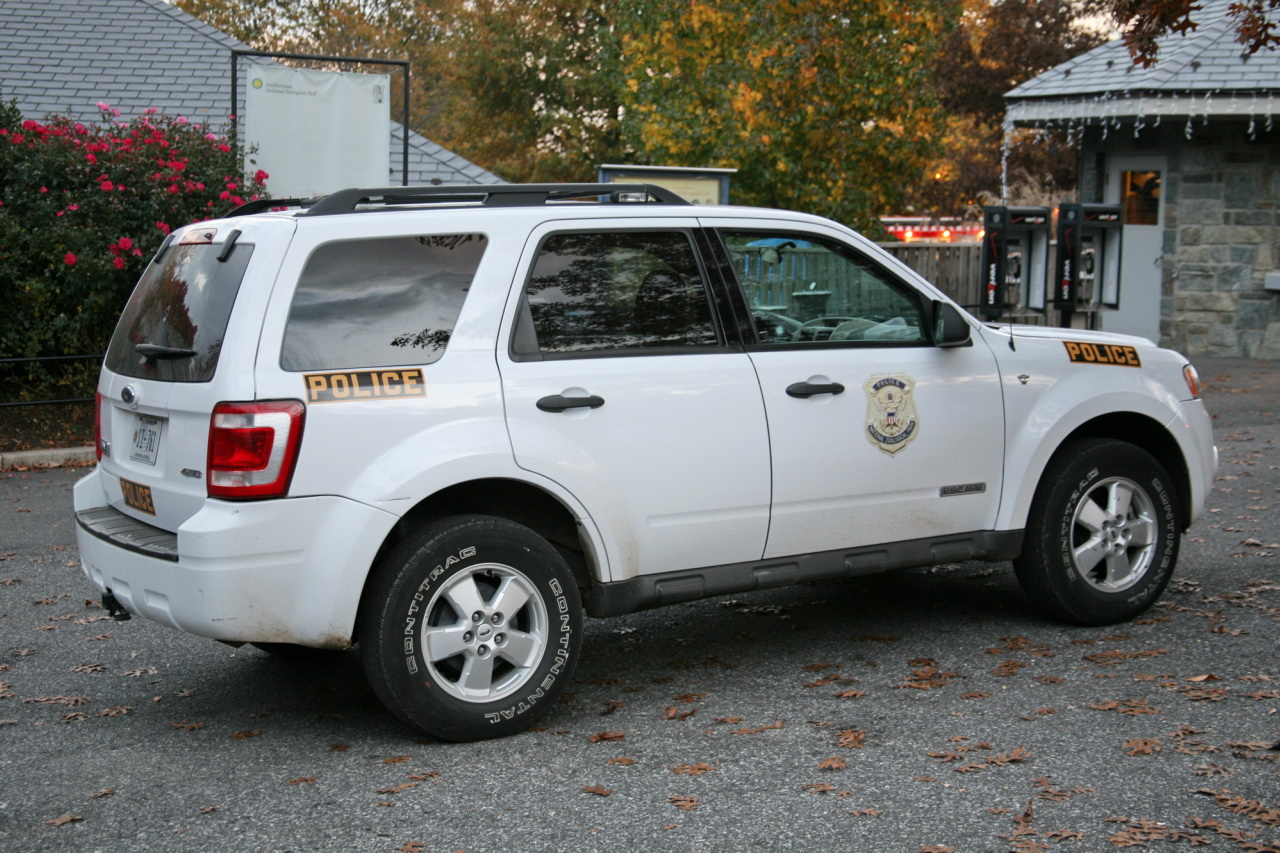
The National Zoo maintains its own Police Department, which consists of 50 full-time and part-time officers

US National Zoological Park Police officers are specifically assigned to the National Zoo and the Smithsonian Conservation Biology Institute in Front Royal, Virginia. The National Zoological Park Police is one of the oldest police forces in the District of Columbia. According to the official National Zoo Website, the Zoological Police was one of the original five police agencies in D.C. created in 1889. The 163-acre (0.66 km^{2}) National Zoo is a Smithsonian facility in the District of Columbia and is staffed 24 hours a day by full-time US National Zoological Park police officers.

The National Zoo also maintains a 3,200-acre Research facility (Smithsonian Conservation Biology Institute; SCBI) in Front Royal, Virginia; which is staffed by members of the National Zoological Park Police. NZPP officers are Federal law enforcement officers and carry full law enforcement jurisdiction within the District of Columbia and Virginia that work closely with the Metropolitan Police Department and the US Park Police, as well as other federal law enforcement agencies to include Virginia law enforcement authorities.

== Exhibits ==
=== David M. Rubenstein Giant Panda Habitat ===
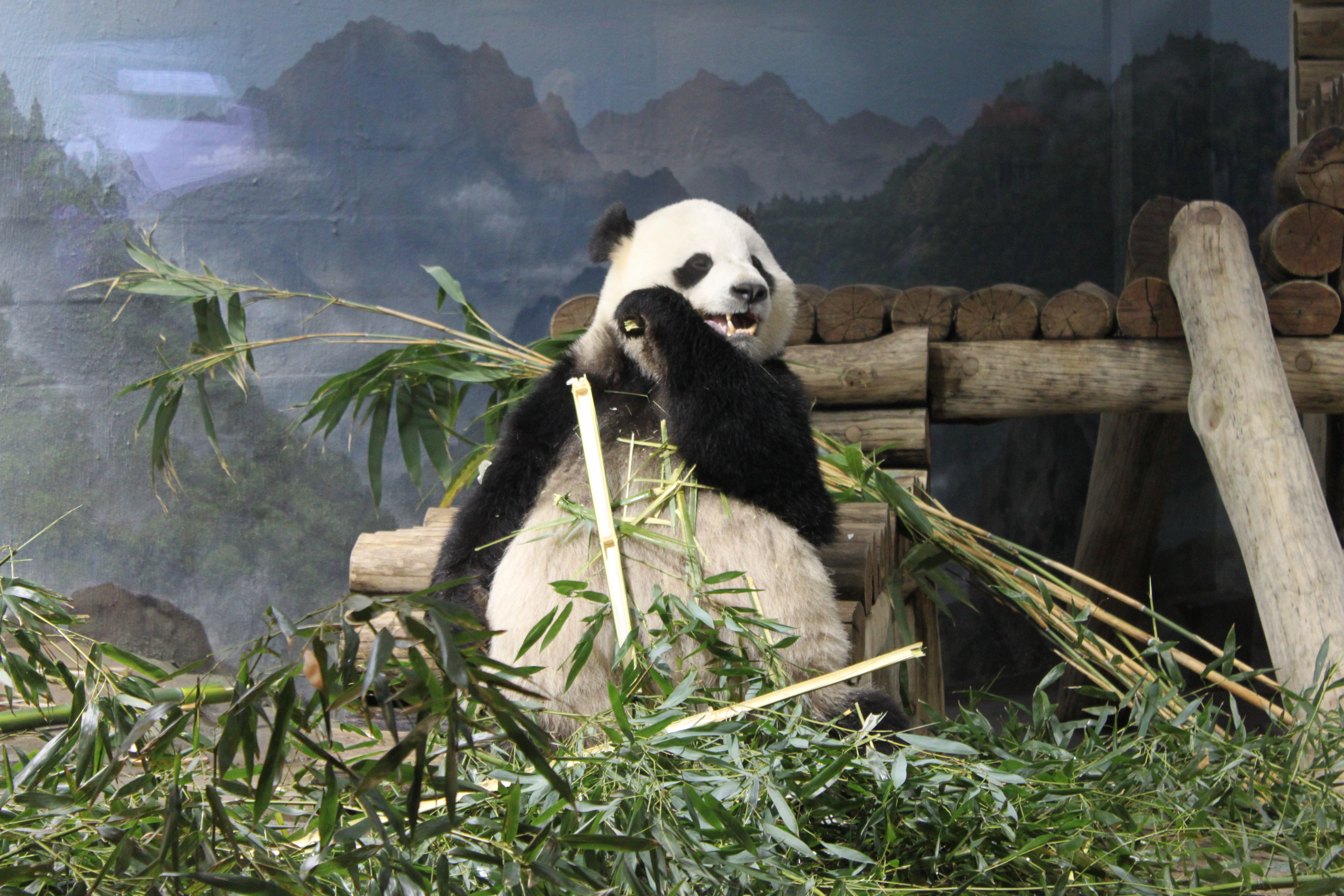
Bao Li at the National Zoo in 2026

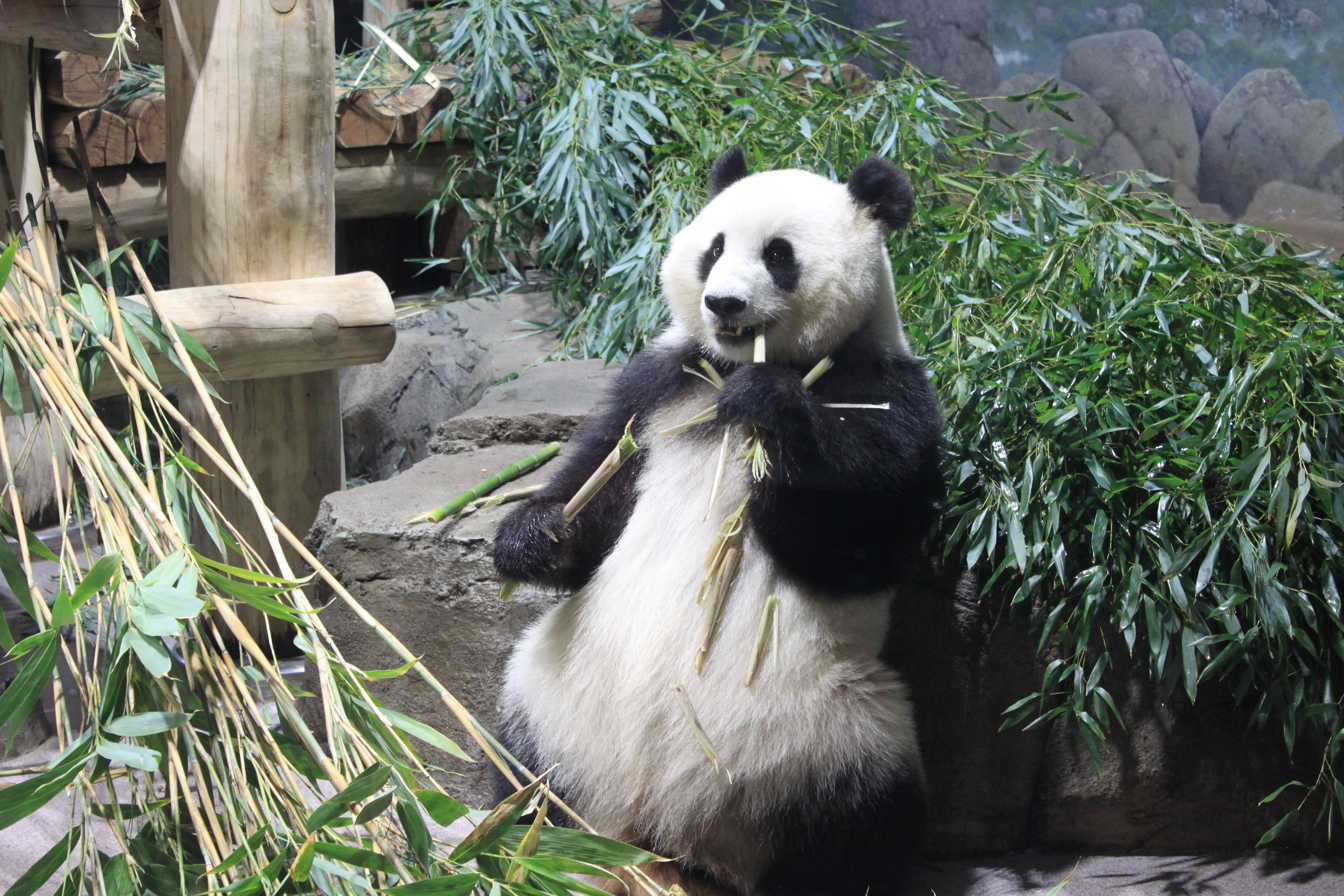
Qing Bao at the National Zoo in 2026

The zoo's state-of-the-art giant panda habitat features three outdoor areas with animal enrichment, an indoor area with a rocky outcrop, a waterfall, and viewing areas. The exhibit is designed to replicate the rocky, lush terrain of the pandas' natural habitat.

The habitat's current residents are a pair of giant pandas named Bao Li and Qing Bao. The pandas arrived at the zoo on October 15, 2024, and after several months acclimating to their new environment, made their public debut on January 24, 2025. They are the newest residents at the habitat after an almost year long gap since the habitat's previous pandas, Mei Xiang, Tian Tian, and their cub Xiao Qi Ji, left the zoo for China in November 2023. The pandas are the focus of a research, conservation, and breeding program which aims to preserve their species.

Mei Xiang and Tian Tian, who were on loan from the China Wildlife Conservation Association, had four surviving cubs together, all by artificial insemination. The first was a male cub, named Tai Shan in 2005. On September 16, 2012, Mei Xiang gave birth to another cub, but the cub died six days after its birth. On August 23, 2013, Mei Xiang gave birth to two cubs; one, a female cub, later named Bao Bao, while the other was stillborn. Mei Xiang delivered two cubs in August 2015, but only one survived, as the other one died a few days later. The surviving male was given the name Bei Bei on September 25, 2015, and was on public exhibit in January 2016 until November 2019. On August 21, 2020, Mei Xiang gave birth to a single male cub, Xiao Qi Ji, becoming the oldest giant panda to give birth in the US at 22 years old.

=== Asia Trail ===
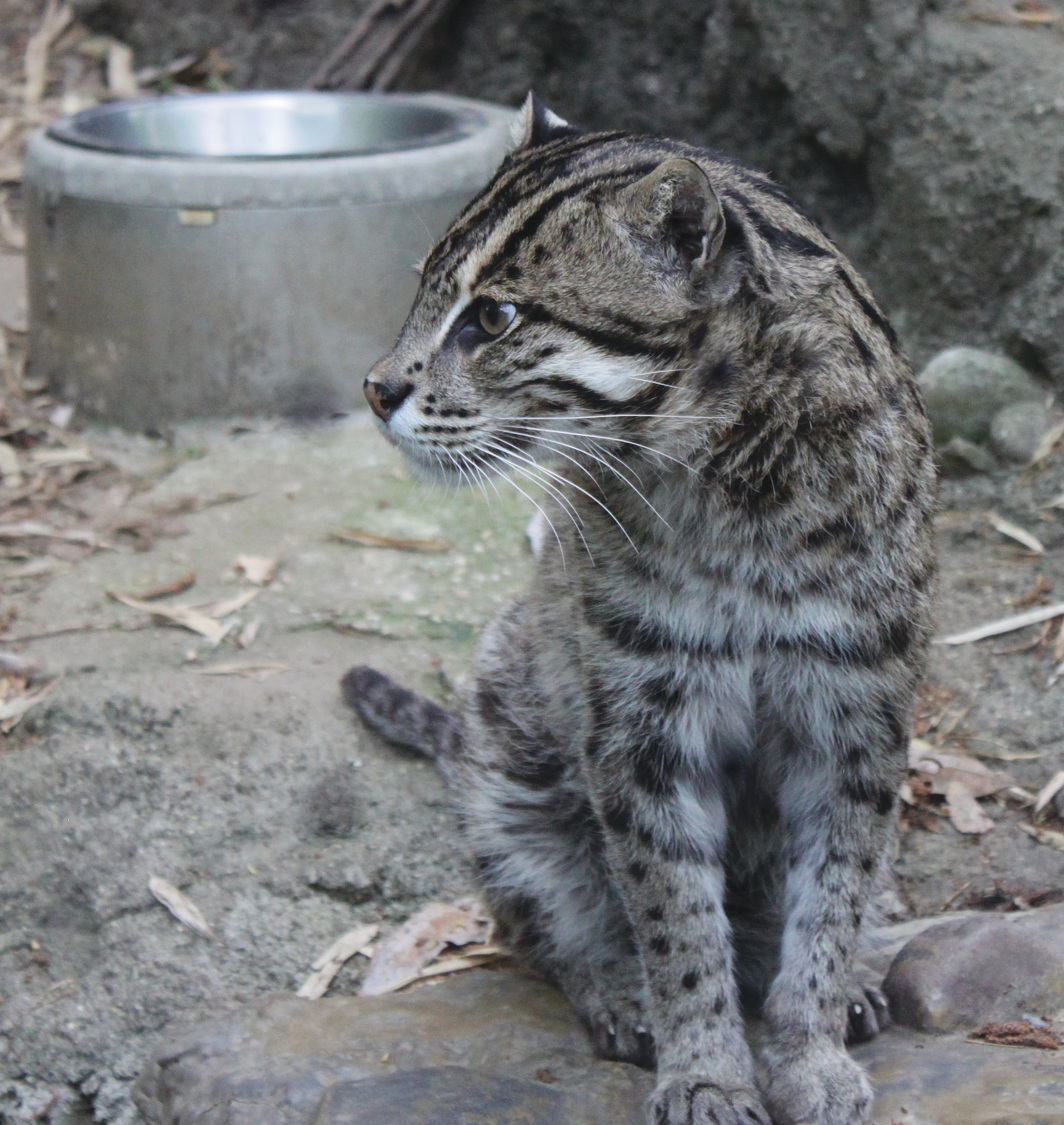
Fishing cat at the Smithsonian National Zoo

A group of Asia-themed exhibits opened in October 2006. Aside from displaying giant pandas, the area displays sloth bears, fishing cats, red pandas, northern snakeheads, clouded leopards and Asian small-clawed otters. Many species on the Asia Trail are listed as endangered.

=== Elephant Trails ===
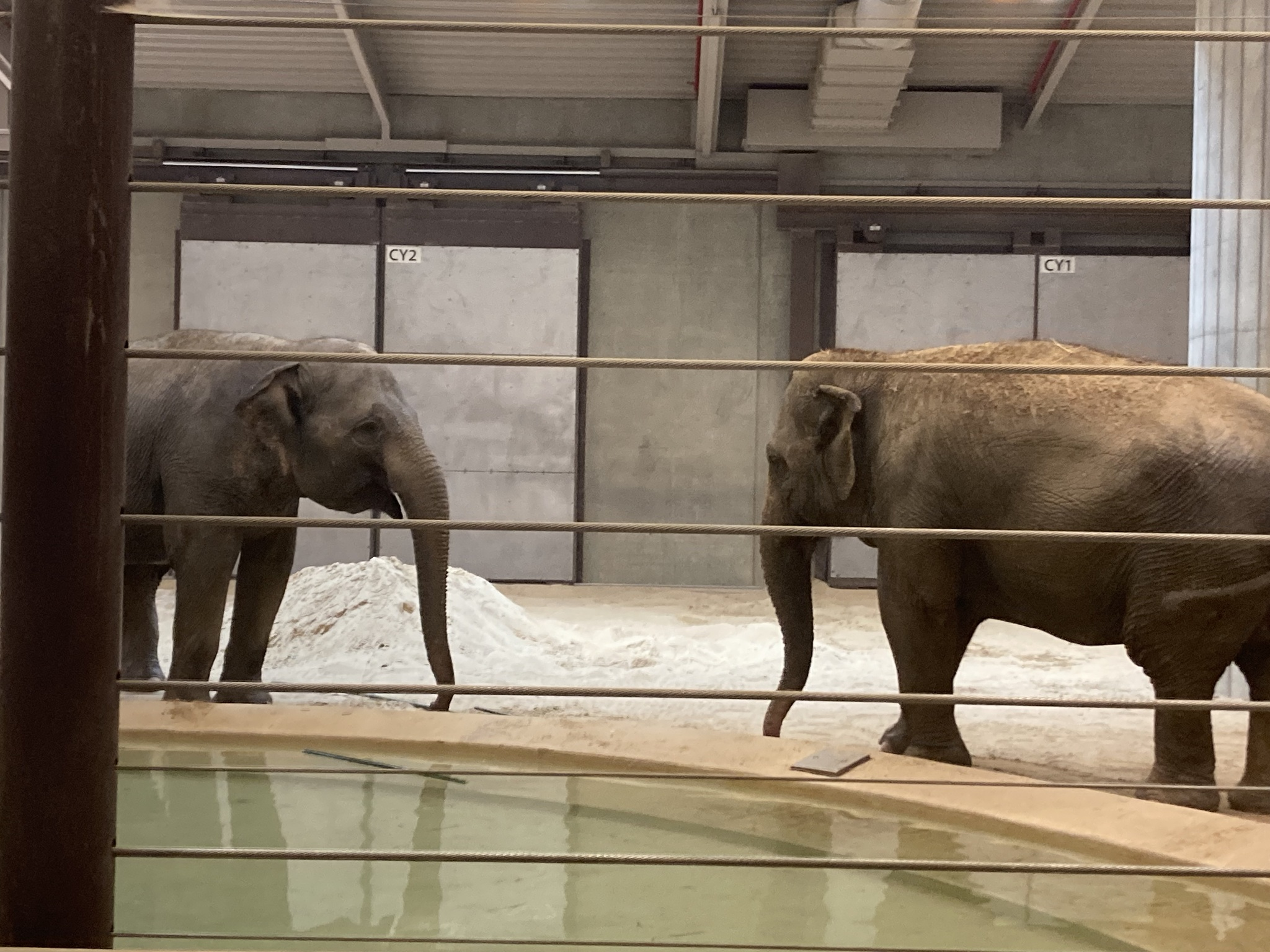
Asian elephants (Elephas maximus) at Smithsonian National Zoo

In spring 2008, the National Zoo began construction on Elephant Trails, a new home for its Asian elephants. The first part of the $52 million project opened in September 2010, expanding the zoo's former elephant area with a 5,700-square-foot (530 m^{2}) barn, two new yards (one with a pool), and a quarter-mile (400 m) walkway through woods, a total of 1.9 acres (0.77 ha) of outdoor space, bringing the total size of Elephant Trails to 2 acres (0.81 ha). Elephant Trails: A Campaign to Save Elephants is a comprehensive breeding, education, and scientific research program. It is designed to help scientists care for elephants in zoos and in the wild. The Elephant House (built in 1937) was closed to the public from September 14, 2009, until late March 2013 for construction of the second phase of Elephant Trails. This includes the Elephant Community Center, an indoor exhibit with many interpretive signs and graphics. The seven Asian elephants that live in Elephant Trails are one bull named Spike and five cows named Bozie, Swarna, Maharani, Trong Nhi, and Nhi Linh and a female calf Linh Mai born to Nhi Linh on February 2, 2026.

=== Lemur Island ===
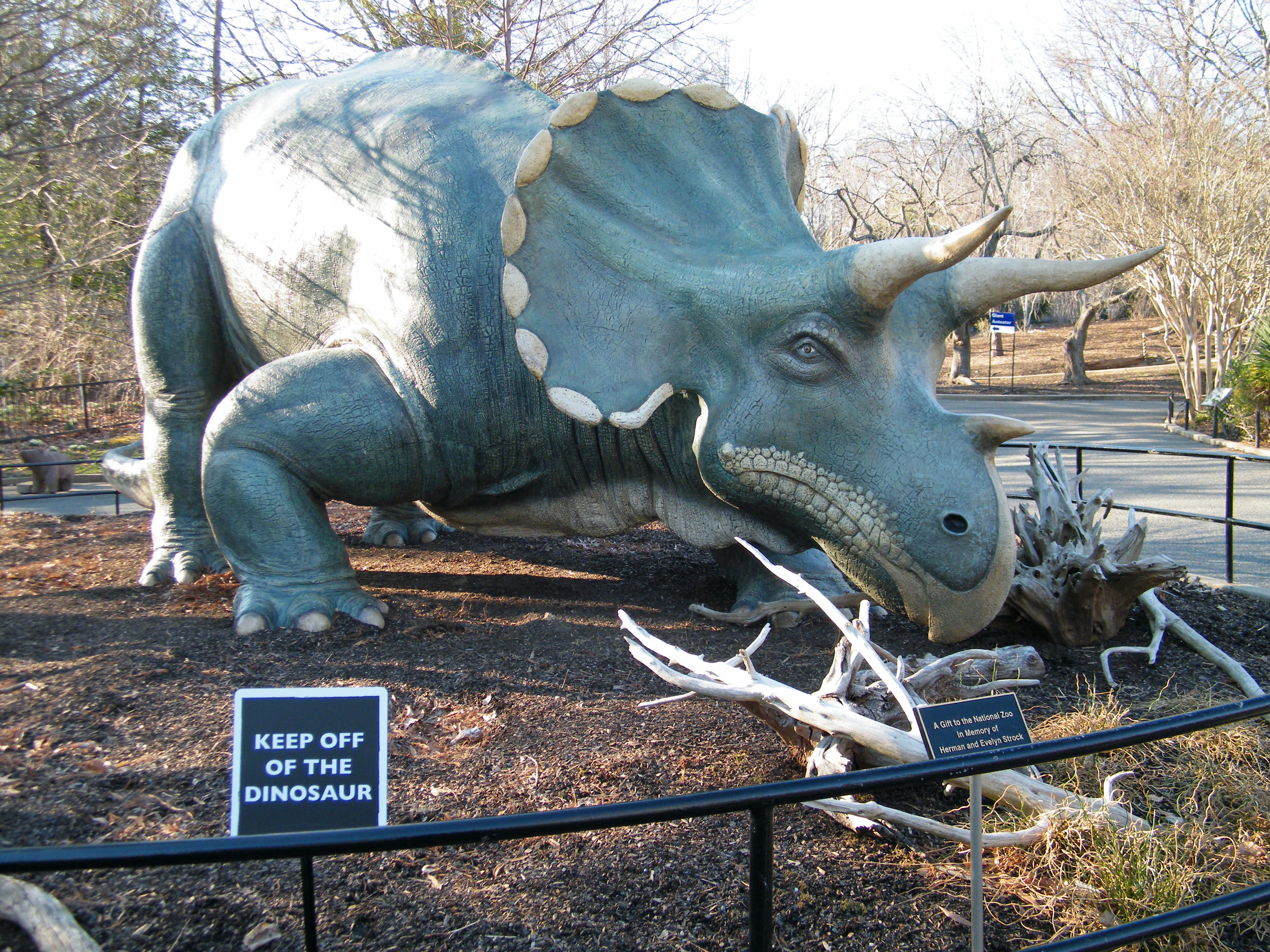
Uncle Beazley near Lemur Island

Lemur Island is a moated island that is home to a bachelor group of ring-tailed lemurs and black-and-white ruffed lemurs. The island, formerly Monkey Island, used to hold Barbary macaques when it opened in 1983.

Near the island is Uncle Beazley, a fiberglass Triceratops that Louis Paul Jonas created for the DinoLand pavilion at the 1964 New York World's Fair. The life-size statue, which had been located on the National Mall near the National Museum of Natural History until 1994, is named for a dinosaur in the 1956 children's book, The Enormous Egg, by Oliver Butterworth and in the book's 1968 television movie adaptation, in which the statue appeared.

=== The Small Mammal House ===
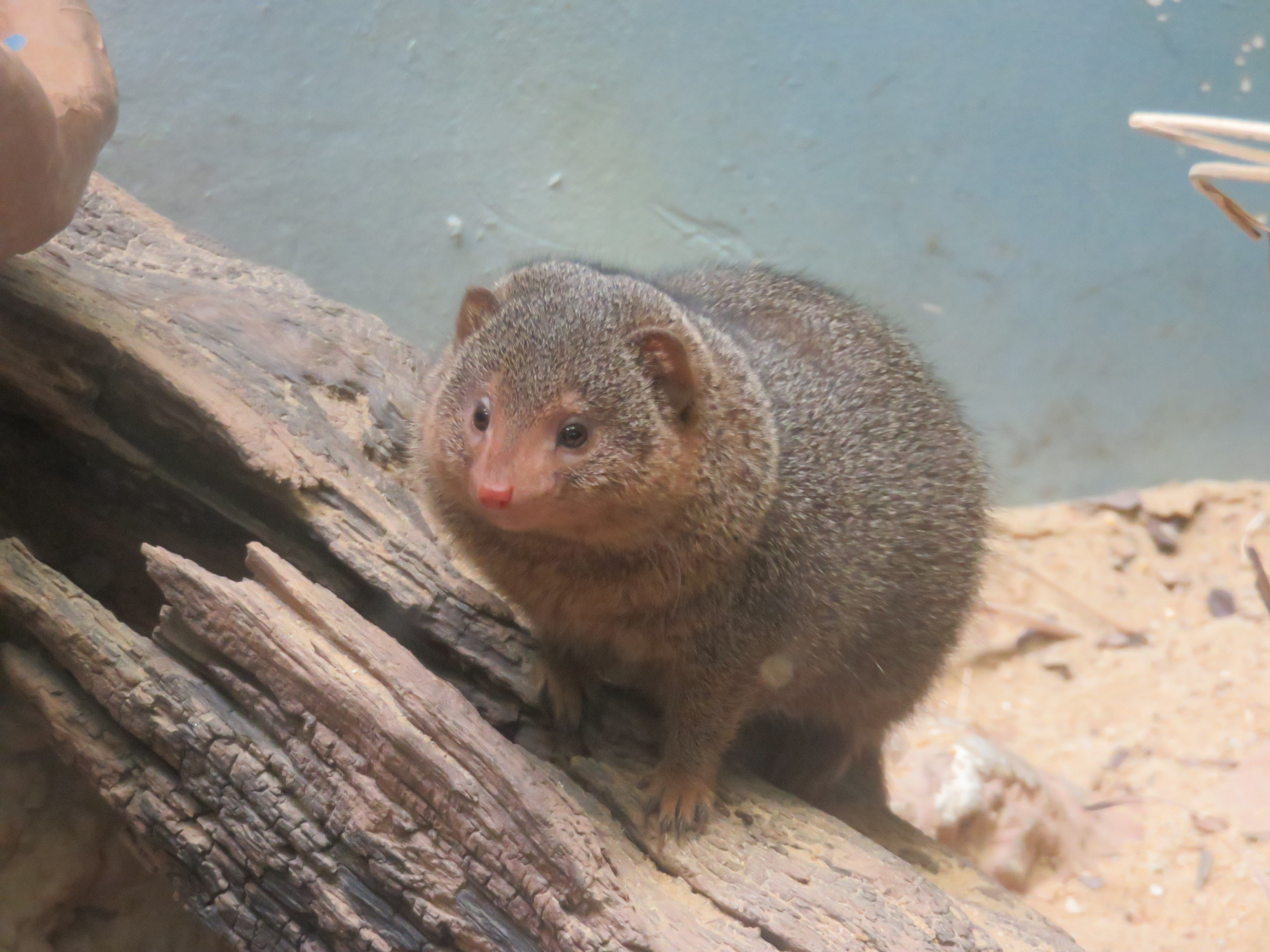
Dwarf mongoose at the National Zoo's Small Mammal House

The majority of the zoo's smaller mammal species live in the Small Mammal House. The species on display include golden lion tamarins, golden-headed lion tamarins, emperor tamarins, Goeldi's marmosets, red ruffed lemurs, lesser hedgehog tenrecs, southern lesser galagos, black-footed ferrets, dwarf mongooses, long-tailed chinchillas, prehensile-tailed porcupines, two-toed sloths, red-rumped agoutis, brush-tailed bettongs, northern treeshrews, La Plata three-banded armadillos, screaming hairy armadillos, sand cats, fennec foxes, meerkats, naked mole-rats, rock hyraxes, striped skunks and several others.

Despite not being a mammal, a green aracari can be found in the building. A sister pair of white-nosed coatis are found behind the building.

=== American Trail ===
The American Trail exhibit houses a variety of species found in North America. These include California sea lions, grey seals, brown pelicans, North American beavers, North American river otters, red wolves, bald eagles, common ravens and eastern screech owls.

The exhibit also features a cafe called Seal Rock Cafe, which offers dishes crafted from local, seasonal, and sustainable ingredients. Menu items include Best Aquaculture Practices (BAP) certified shrimp and Marine Stewardship Council (MSC) certified fish.

=== Great Ape House ===
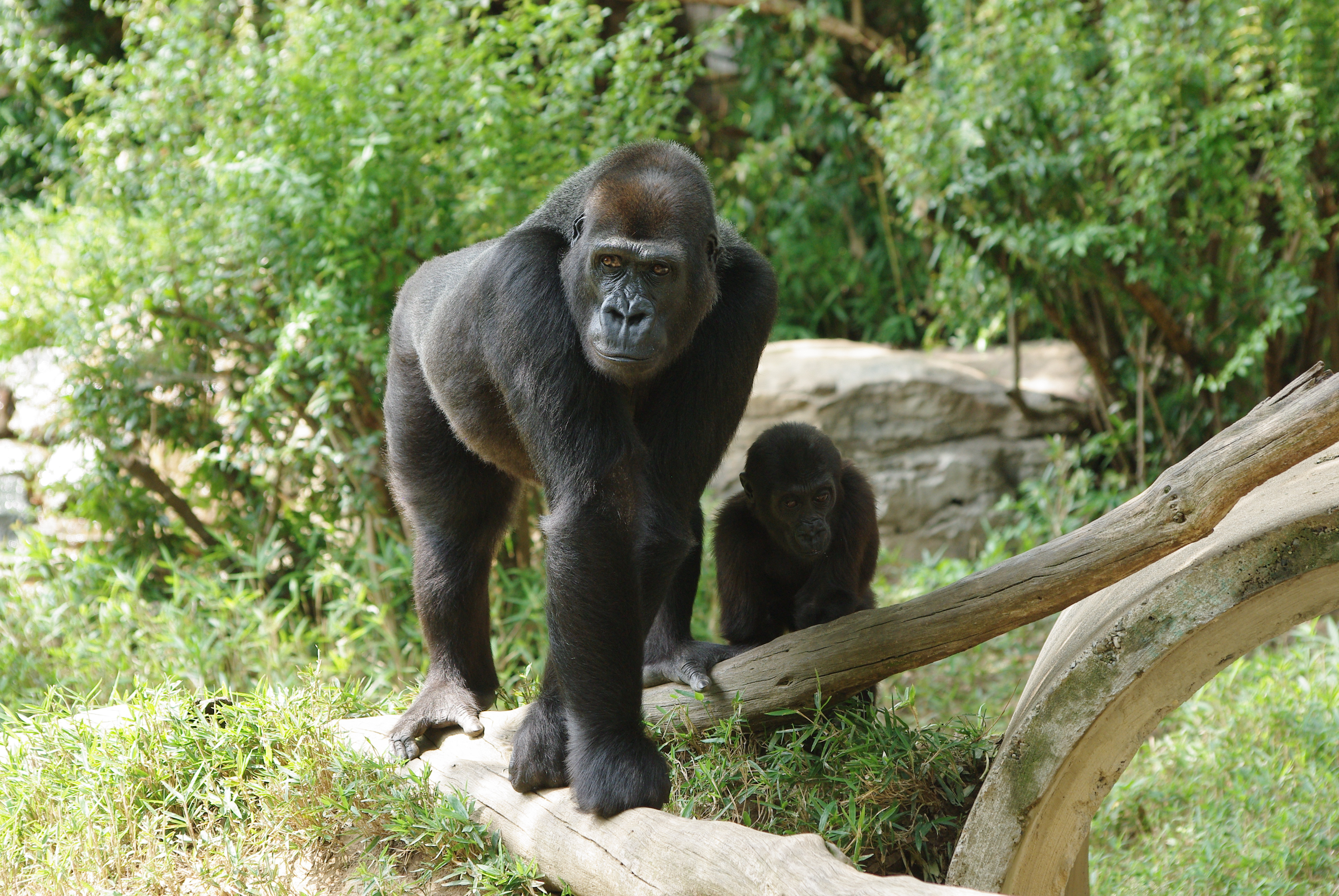
Gorillas at the National Zoo

The Great Ape House opened in 1981 and is separated into two sets of enclosures. One houses five western lowland gorillas (a male named Baraka Ya Mwelu; three females named Calaya, Mandara and Kibibi; and a female infant named Zahra, born in 2023). The other houses six orangutans (two males named Kiko and Redd; and four females named Batang, Lucy, Iris and Bonnie). The orangutans are allowed access to the Think Tank (see below) by traveling along the "O-Line", a series of high cables supported by metal towers that enable the orangutans to move between the two buildings. Batang and Redd are Bornean orangutans while Kiko, Lucy, Iris and Bonnie are all hybrid orangutans.

=== Think Tank ===
The Think Tank is an area designed to educate visitors about how animals think and learn about their surroundings. Think Tank opened in 1995 and features several interactive displays that teach visitors how zoologists conduct their studies. The zoo's orangutans (which are sometimes used in keeper demonstrations) are allowed to move from the Great Ape House to Think Tank, and the building includes suitable enclosures for the apes should they choose to stay there. Other animals kept and studied in the Think Tank include land hermit crabs, brown rats, and Allen's swamp monkeys.

=== Gibbon Ridge ===
Gibbon Ridge is an enclosure housing four siamangs (two males named Bradley and Guntur and two females named Ronnie and Adinda).

=== Great Cats ===
Video of lions grooming in a heated cave at the zoo

The Great Cats exhibit opened in the mid-1970s and is separated into three enclosures with a moat. The zoo rotates two lions (two males named Shaka and Jumbe) and three tigers (a Sumatran tigress named Damai and two Siberian tigers, a male named Vostok and a female named Coba) between the three exhibits.

In between the main lion and tiger yards and the Think Tank exhibit are two habitats, one features a pair of Bat-Eared Foxes named Lando and Ziggy, and the other is currently empty but will feature Canada Lynx in the future.

=== Africa Trail ===
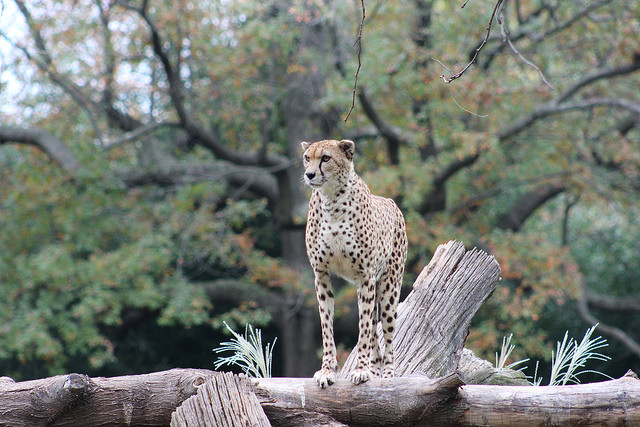
A cheetah (Acinonyx jubatus) at the National Zoo

Formerly called the Cheetah Conservation Station, this outdoor exhibit is designed to mimic the African savanna, to educate visitors about cheetahs, and what is being done to preserve them in the wild. The area is currently closed for a multi-year renovation process, with a scheduled completion by the end of 2026. Other animals on display in the area prior to the renovations include a Hartmann's mountain zebra, addaxes, an ostrich, Grévy's zebras, maned wolves, Rüppell's griffon vultures, sitatungas, scimitar-horned oryx, dama gazelles, red river hogs, Abyssinian ground hornbills and lesser kudu.

=== Amazonia ===
Opened in 1992, this South America-themed walk-through exhibit contains animal and plant species native to the Amazon basin. Animals on display include multiple species of freshwater stingrays, silver arowanas, yellow-spotted river turtles, red-footed tortoises, arapaimas, black pacus, a two-toed sloth, a Wattled Jacana, green aracaris, roseate spoonbills, hawk-headed parrots, guinea pigs and many more.

The Amazonia Science Gallery is located on the lower level. Here visitors can learn about the zoo's efforts to protect species around the globe. Some of the species on display include Panamanian golden frogs, smooth-sided toads, lemur leaf frogs, African clawed frogs, aquatic caecilians, barred tiger salamanders and many species of poison dart frogs. Located within the science gallery is the Coral Lab. Many corals are on display along with clownfish, sea anemones and other species.

The Electric Fishes Demonstration Lab features a five-foot-long electric eel. Bluntnose knifefish, elephantnose knifefish, black ghost knifefish and South American lungfish are also featured.

=== The Reptile Discovery Center ===
The zoo's reptile house opened in 1931 and exhibits seventy species of reptiles and amphibians. These include Aldabra tortoises, radiated tortoises, spider tortoises, Home's hinge-back tortoises, Cuban crocodiles, a false gharial, Japanese giant salamanders, eastern indigo snakes, Gila monsters, blue iguanas,tokay geckos, Iranian fat-tailed geckos, a green anaconda, a Burmese python, green tree pythons, Timor pythons, king cobras, northern copperheads, banded rock rattlesnakes, hellbenders, eastern red-backed salamanders, long-tailed salamanders, alligator snapping turtles and many more.

Behind the building are exhibits for the Komodo dragon, and Chinese alligators. In the front of the building is an exhibit for an American alligator named Wally.

=== The Bird House ===
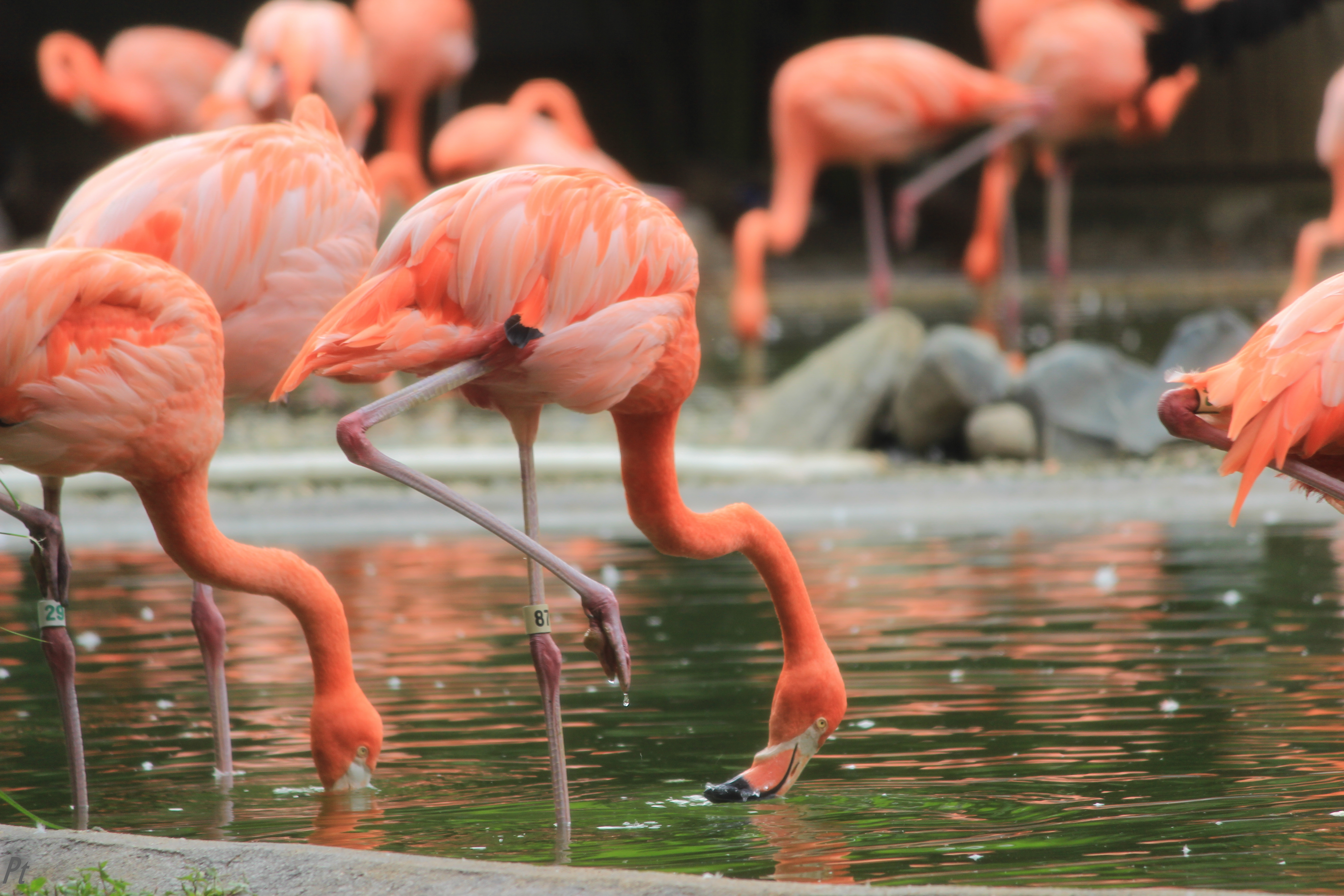
American flamingos (Phoenicopterus ruber) outside of The Bird House

Opened in 1928, the zoo's Bird House focuses on the biological phenomenon of migration in the eastern hemisphere and features three distinct aviaries, each focusing on a different habitat that is crucial to the bird's annual migrations. The habitats include: Delaware Bay, a marsh environment that displays shorebirds including red knots and semipalmated plovers, as well as cold-blooded species such as horseshoe crabs and native fish, Prairie Pothole, a wetlands environment that displays waterfowl including canvasbacks, redheads and American avocets, and Costa Rican Coffee Farm, a two-story tropical environment that displays migratory songbirds such as Baltimore orioles, indigo buntings and wood thrushes as well as barred parakeets. Exhibits surrounding the exterior of the Bird House hold kori bustards, sandhill cranes, whooping cranes, greater rheas, barred owls, bronze turkeys, southern cassowaries, American flamingos and other larger birds. The birdhouse closed for renovations in 2017, and reopened in 2023.

=== Claws & Paws Pathway ===
The Claws & Paws Pathway exhibit is the most recent exhibit added in the zoo. It is a small circular path that includes exhibits for binturongs, bobcats, Chacoan peccaries, Pallas's cats and a North American porcupine.

=== The Kids' Farm ===
The Kids' Farm opened in 2004 and is aimed primarily at children and housing domesticated livestock. Animals kept in the Kids' Farm include alpacas, hens, miniature Mediterranean donkeys, Hereford and Holstein cows, Kunekune pigs and Nigerian Dwarf goats. The exhibit also has a small pond containing koi and channel catfish. In 2011, the zoo announced plans to close The Kids' Farm due to budgetary constraints. However, a $1.4 million donation from State Farm Insurance allowed the exhibit to remain open.

=== American Bison Exhibit ===
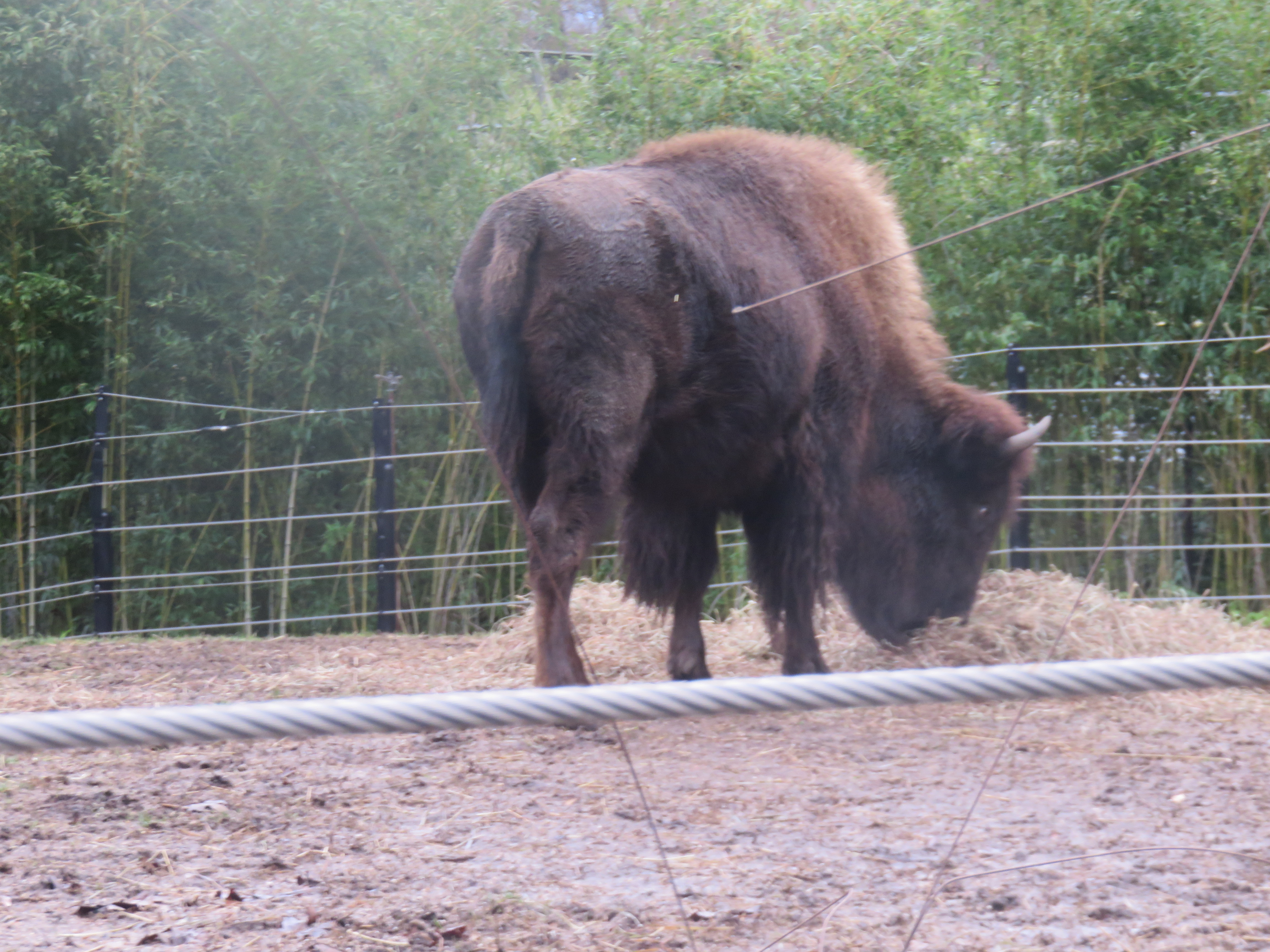
An American bison at the National Zoo

The zoo opened a new American bison exhibit on August 30, 2014, as part of their 125th-anniversary celebration. The exhibit features two female bison, named Lucy and Gally, that were transported to the zoo in 2020 from the American Prairie in northeastern Montana. The bison is not on display as of summer 2025. In early 2026, plans were unveiled for an Arabian leopard complex that would replace the existing bison exhibit.

=== Other animals ===
Other animals in the zoo's collection include spectacled bears (near the Amazonia exhibit), black-tailed prairie dogs (near the Claws and Paws Pathway exhibit), Przewalski's horses (near the Small Mammal House), Patagonian maras (near the American Trail), and Bennett's wallabies (also near the Small Mammal House).

== Gallery ==
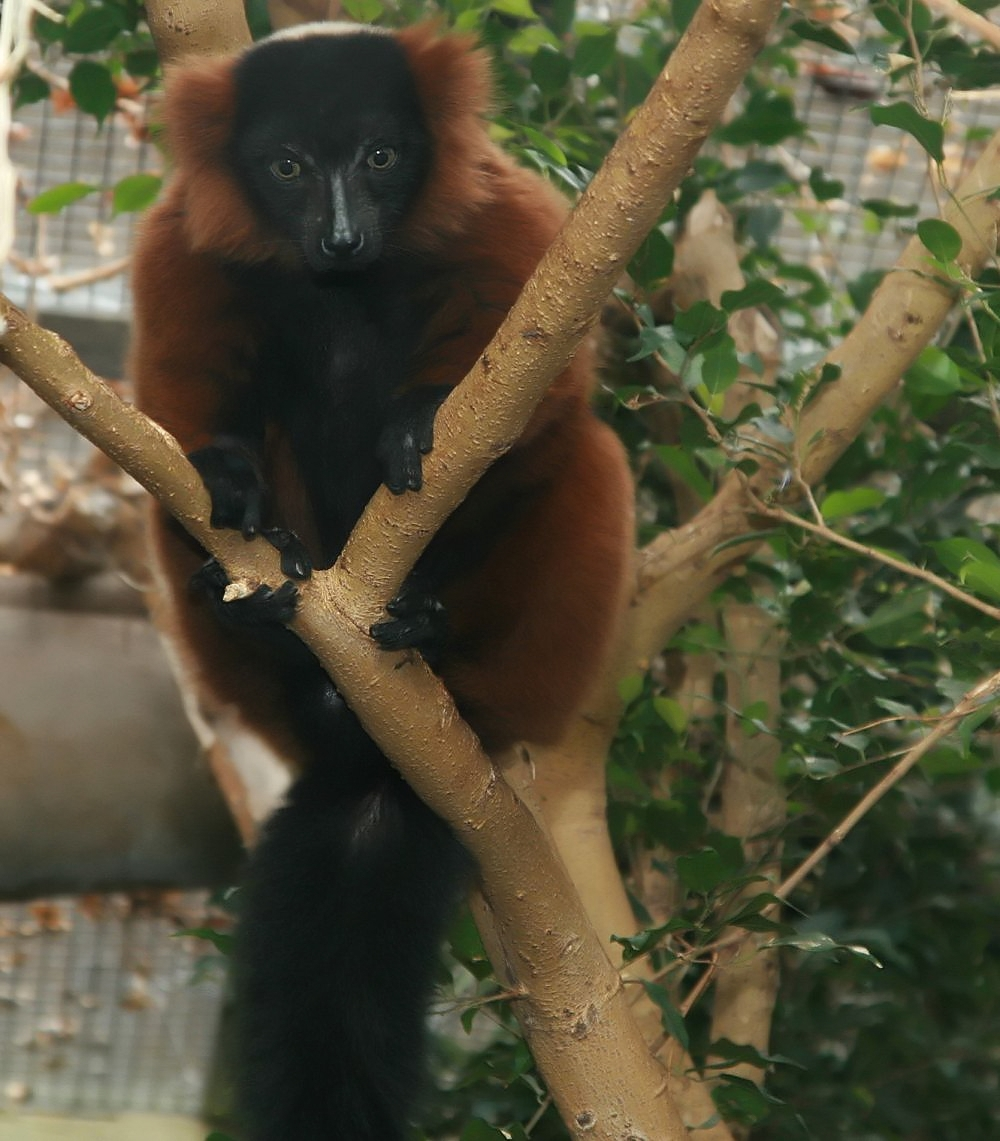
Red ruffed lemur (Varecia rubra)

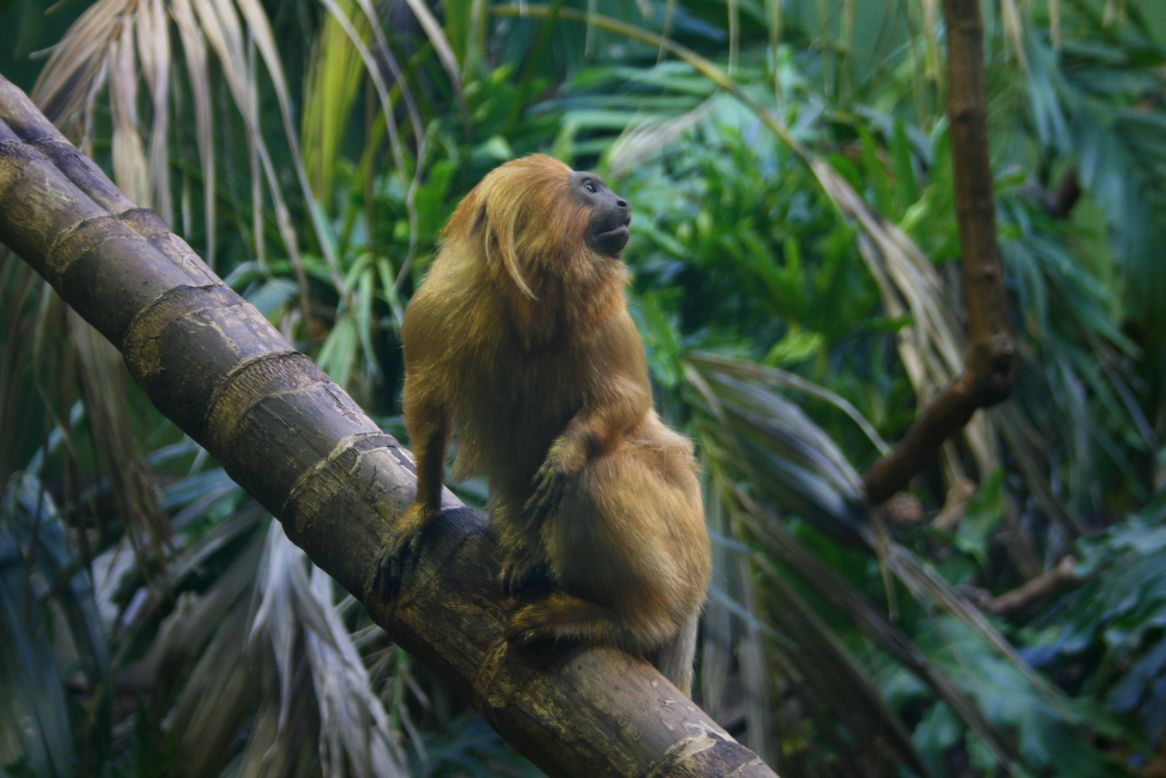
Golden lion tamarin (Leontopithecus rosalia)

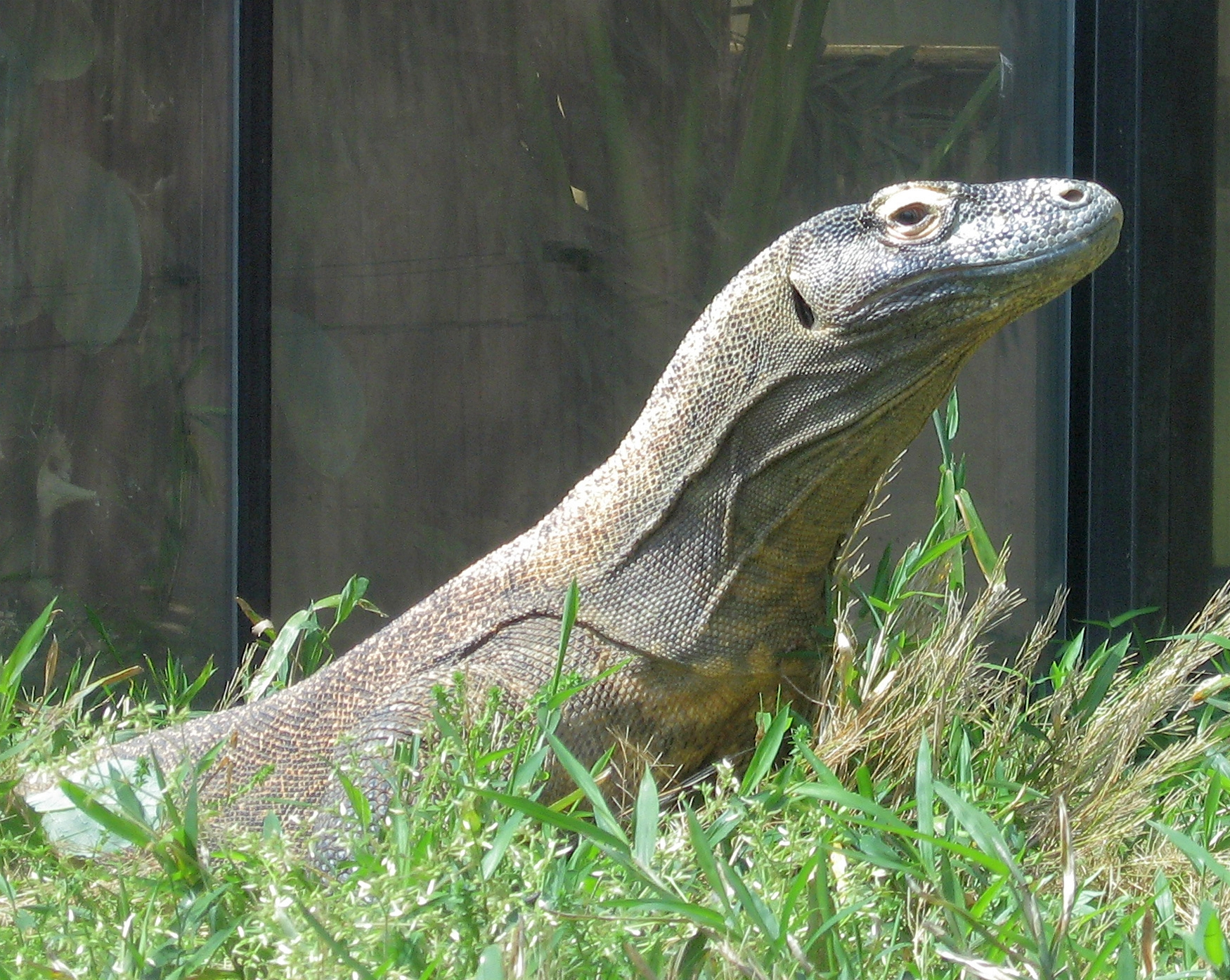
A Komodo dragon at the zoo's Reptile Discovery Center

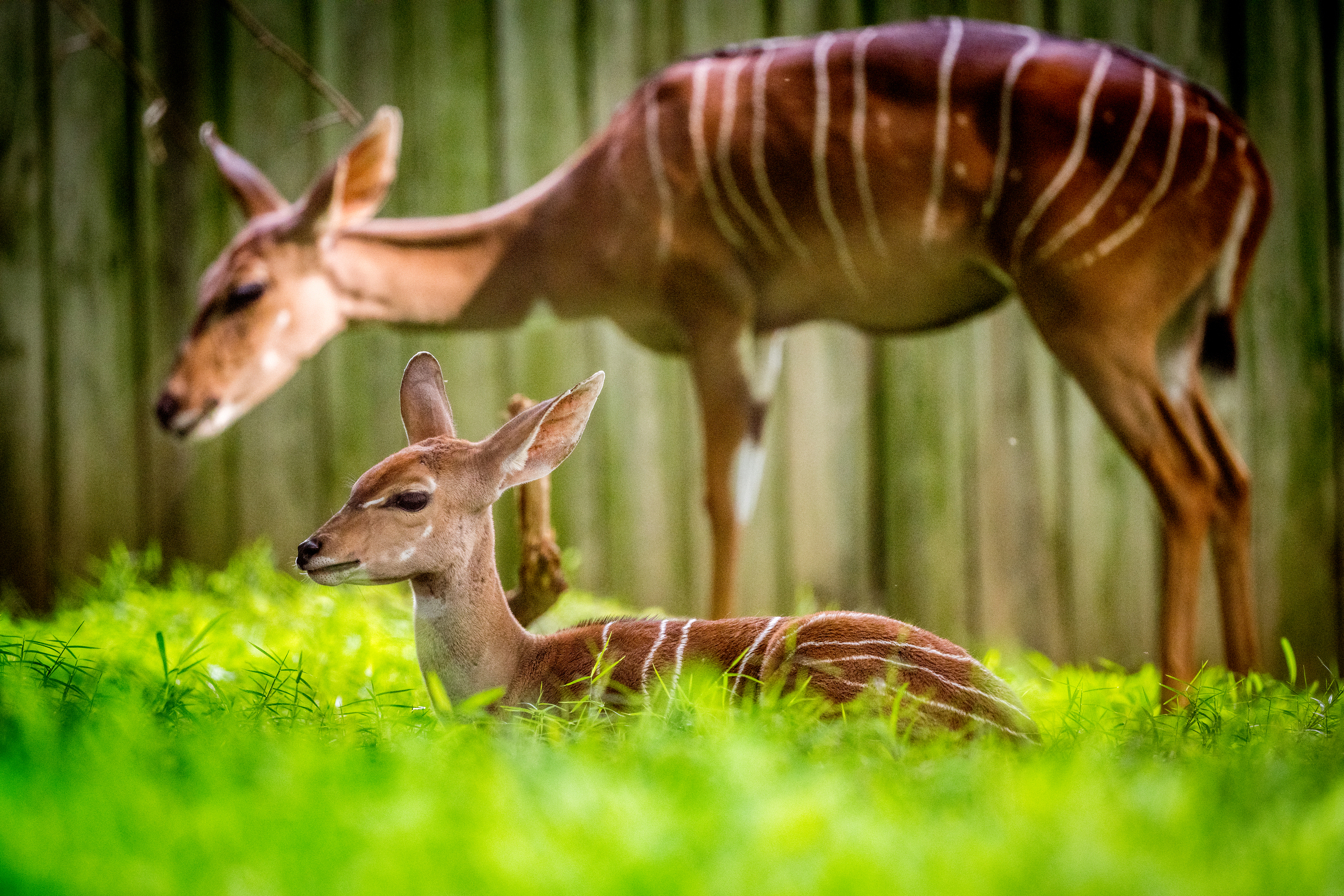
Lesser kudus at the National Zoo

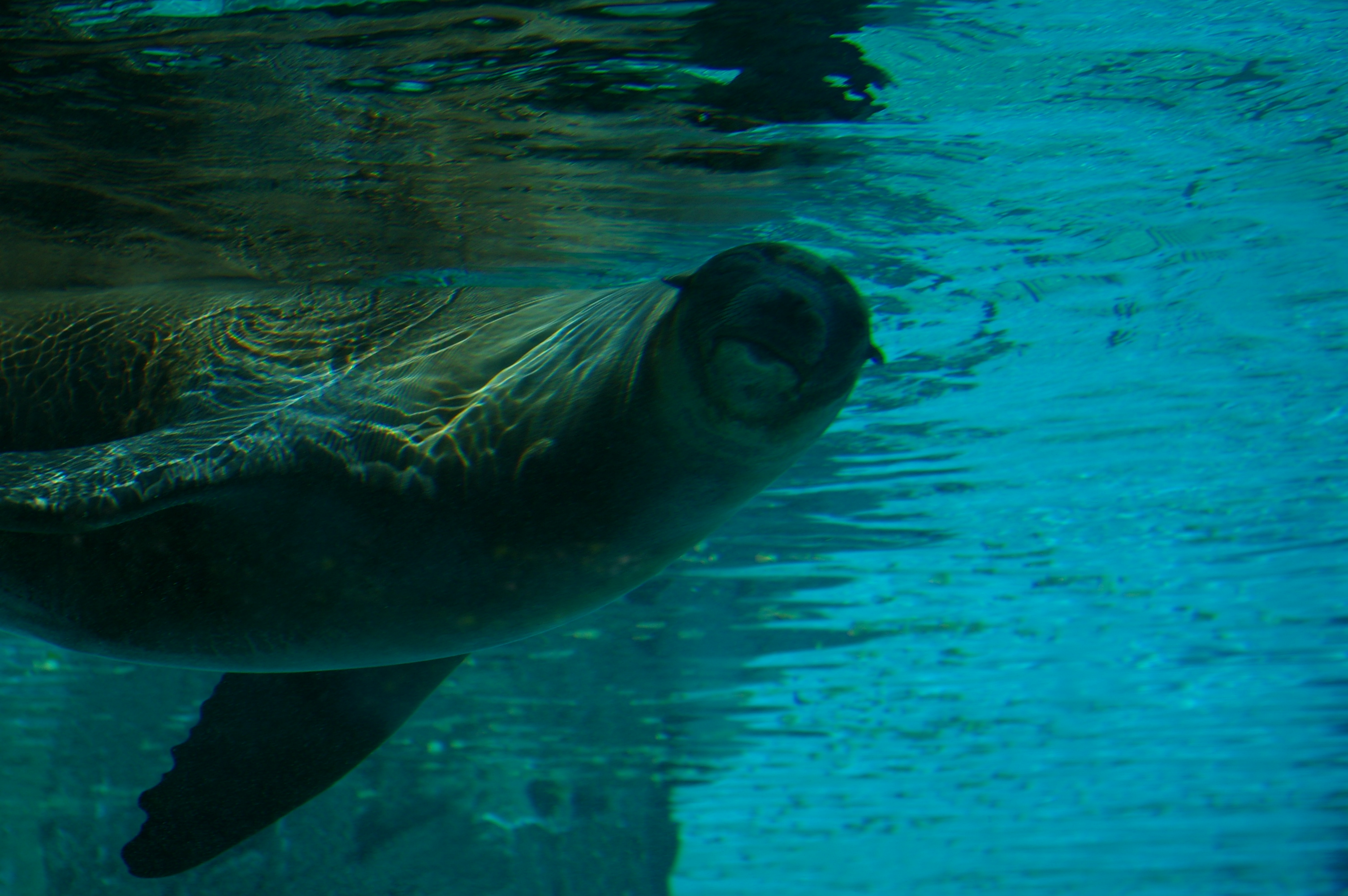
A California sea lion underwater

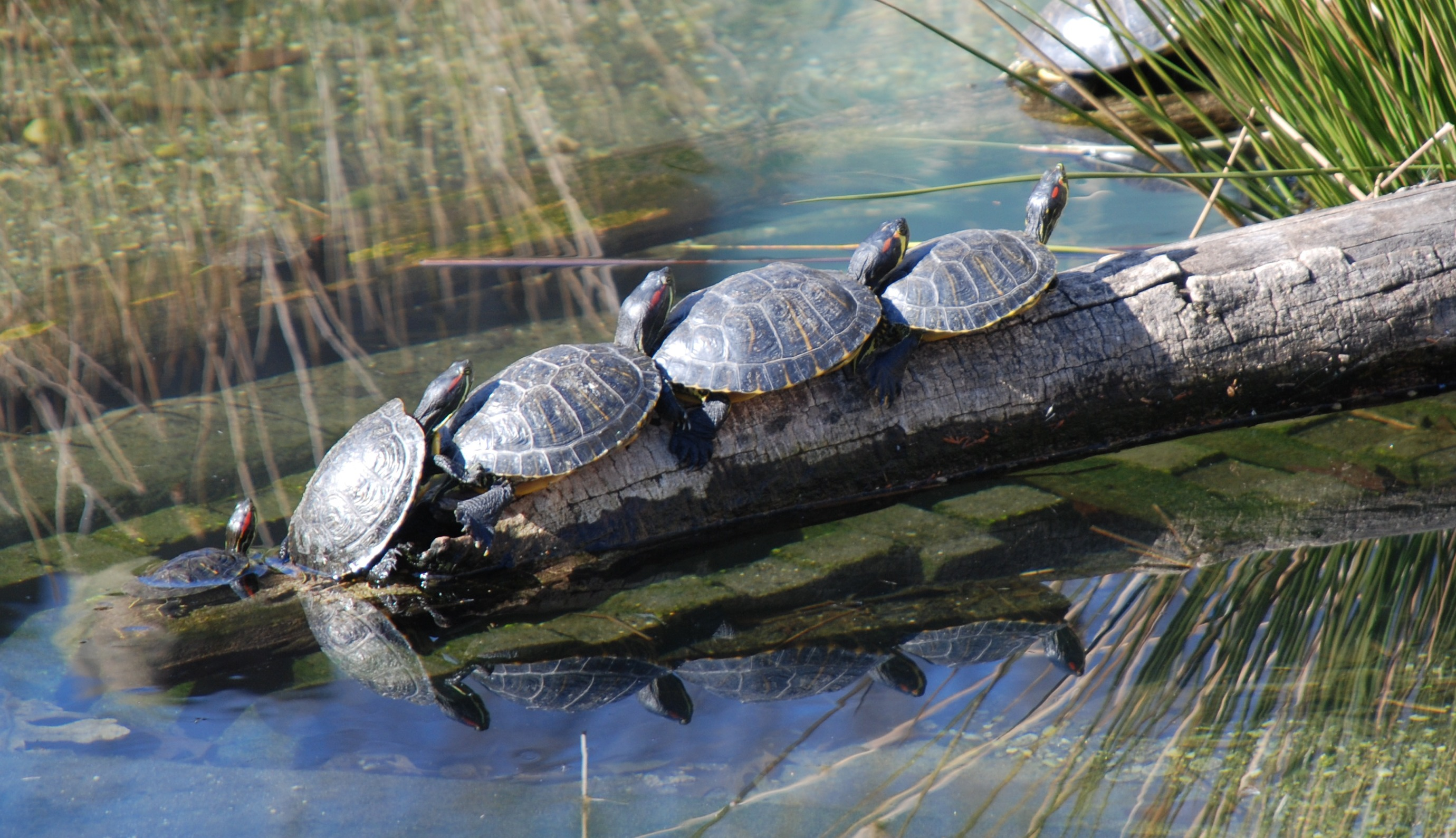
Pond sliders on a tree log at the zoo

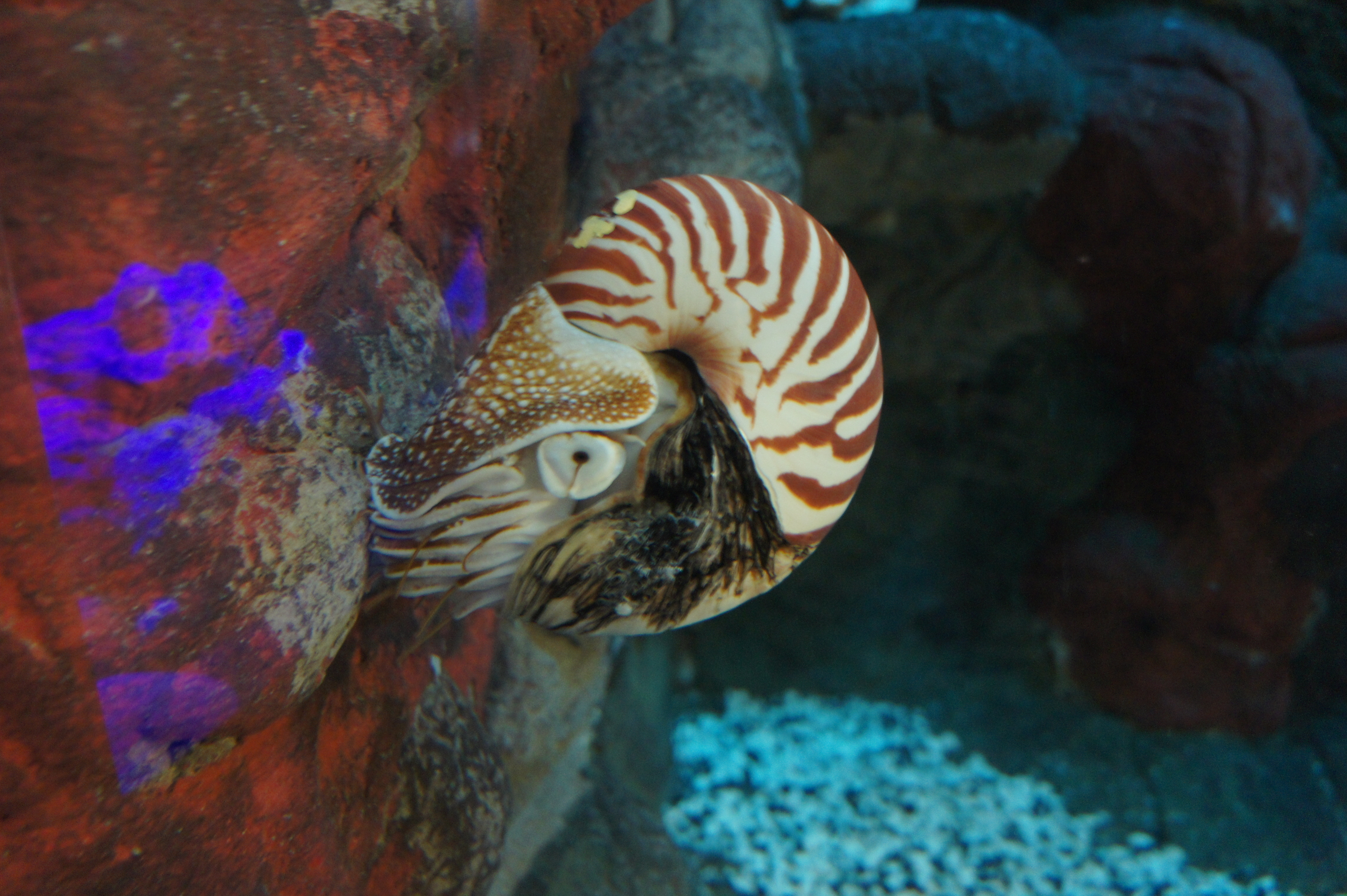
Chambered nautilus (Nautilus pompilius) at the zoo's former Invertebrate Exhibit.

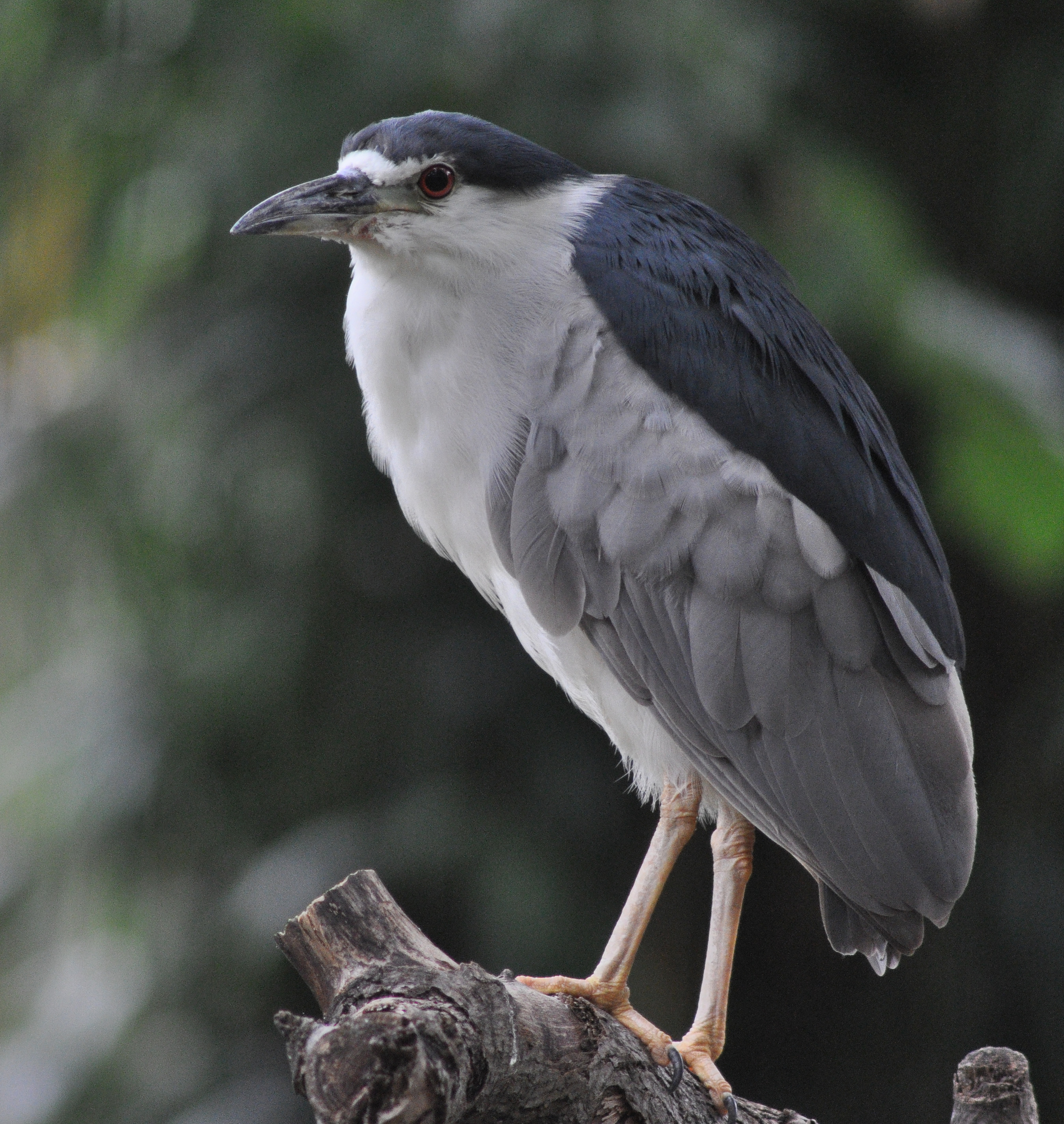
Black-crowned night heron (Nycticorax nycticorax)

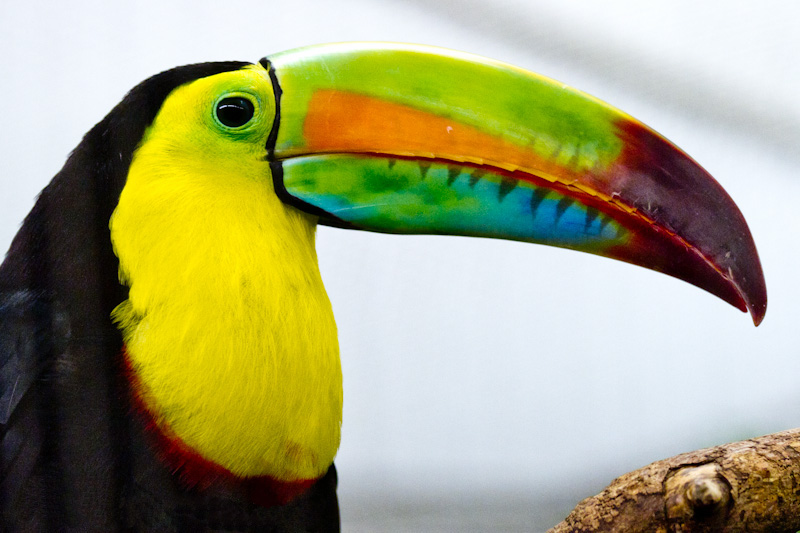
Keel-billed toucan (Ramphastos sulfuratus)

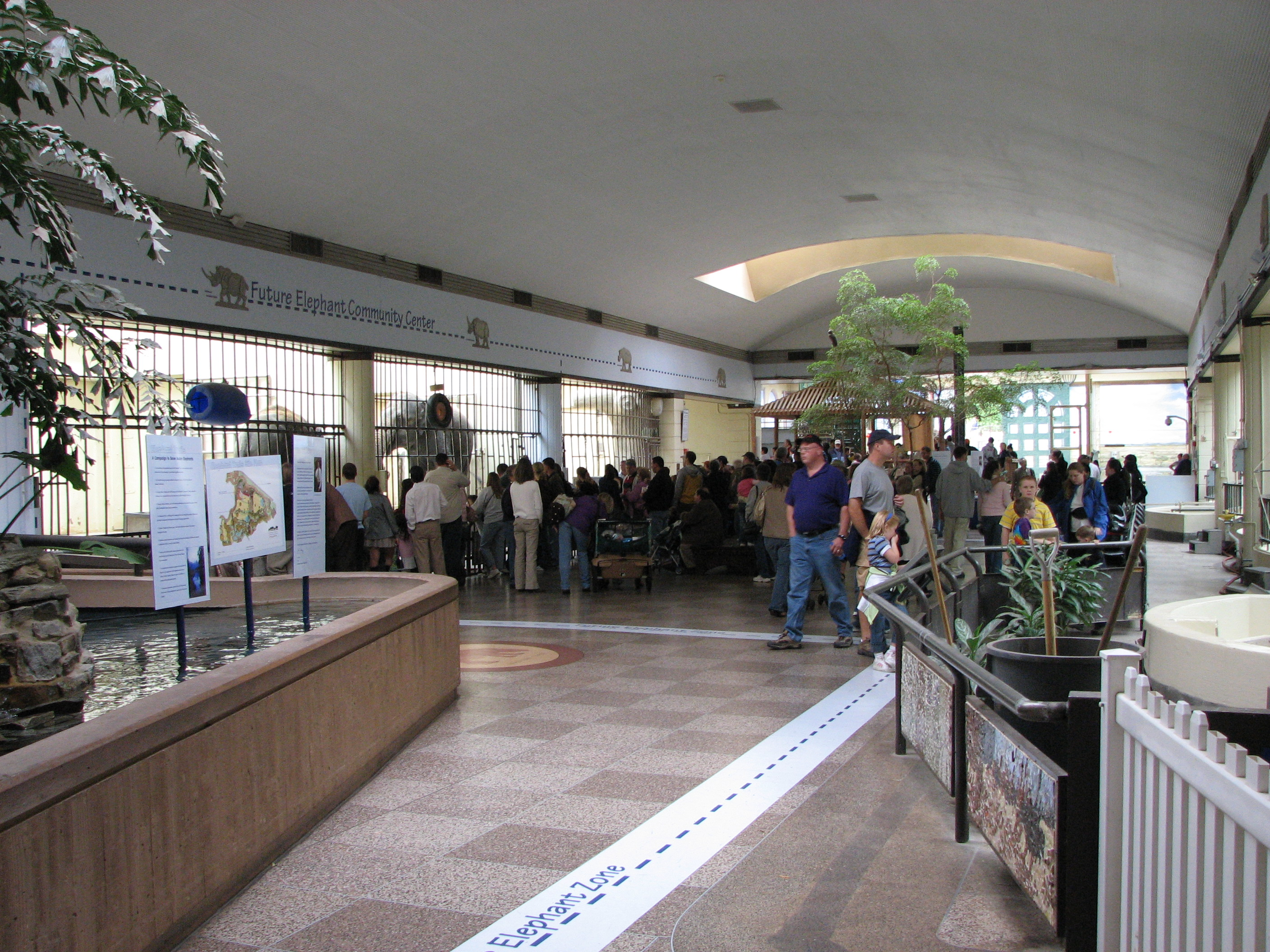
Inside the zoo's Elephant House before transformation into Elephant Community Center

== Notable animals ==
=== Smokey Bear ===
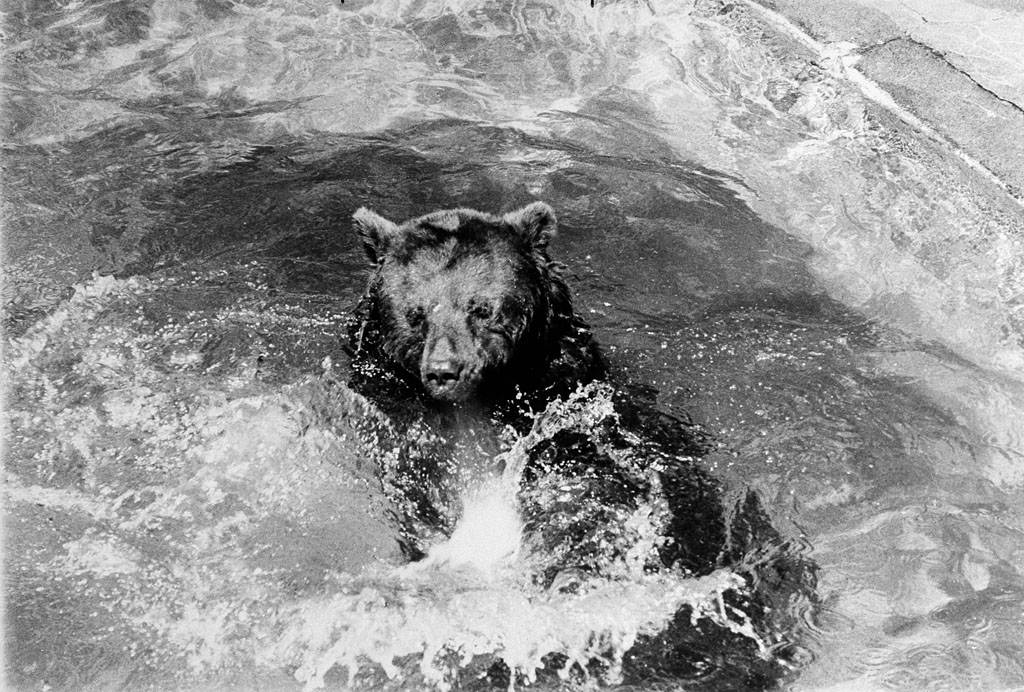
Smokey Bear playing in his pool, sometime in the 1950s

One of the most famous animals to have spent much of his life at the zoo was Smokey Bear, the "living symbol" of the cartoon icon created as part of a campaign to prevent forest fires. A black bear cub rescued from a fire, he lived at the zoo from 1950 until his death in 1976. During his time at the zoo, he had millions of visitors and an abundance of personal mail addressed to him – up to 13,000 letters a week – such that the U.S. Post Office designated a special zip code for correspondence addressed to him.

During his time at the zoo, he was "married" to Goldie Bear, with the hope that one of his offspring would continue to hold the title of Smokey Bear. When the pair produced no offspring, an orphaned bear cub was added to their cage. It was named "Little Smokey", with the announcement that the bear couple had "adopted" the new cub. In 1975, an official ceremony was held to recognize the retirement of Smokey Bear and the new title of "Smokey Bear II" for Little Smokey. Upon the death of the original Smokey Bear, The Washington Post printed an obituary, recognizing him as a "New Mexico native" who had resided in Washington, D.C., for many years, working for the government.

=== Ham ===
Ham was the first great ape ever launched into space in 1961. The chimpanzee would later retire to the National Zoo in 1963, residing for 17 years as a lone chimp until he was transferred to the North Carolina Zoo, where he lived among other chimpanzees for the remaining years of his life, passing in 1983.

=== Giant pandas ===
==== Ling-Ling and Hsing-Hsing ====
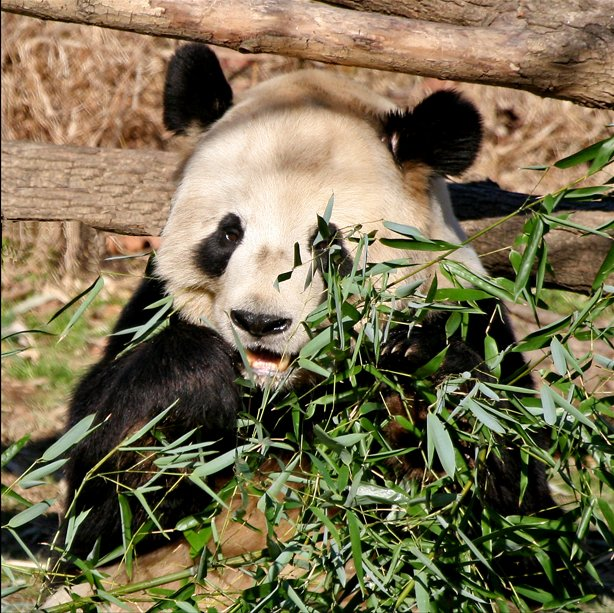
Tai Shan at the National Zoo

During President Richard Nixon's historic 1972 visit to China, the Chinese government donated two giant pandas, Ling-Ling (female) and Hsing-Hsing (male), to the official United States delegation. First Lady Pat Nixon donated the pandas to the zoo, where she welcomed them in an April 1972 ceremony. The first giant pandas in America, Ling-Ling and Hsing-Hsing were among the most popular animals at the zoo. Ling-Ling died in 1992 and Hsing-Hsing in 1999. Although Ling-Ling and Hsing-Hsing had five cubs between 1983 and 1989, all died as infants.

==== Mei Xiang and Tian Tian ====
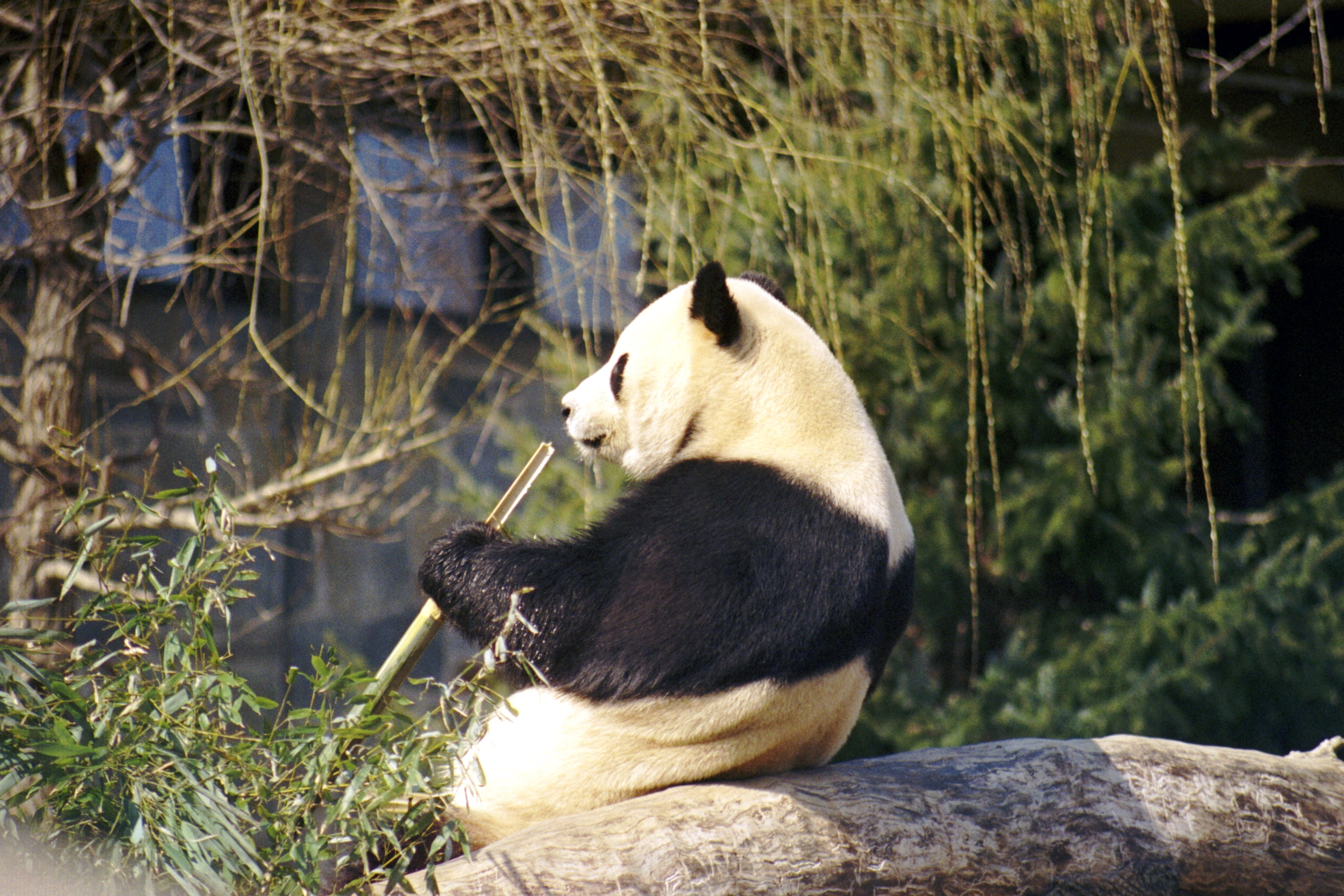
Tian Tian at the National Zoo in 2004

Video of Mei Xiang (adult female) and Bei Bei (male cub)

A new pair of pandas, female Mei Xiang ("Beautiful Fragrance") and male Tian Tian ("More and More"), arrived on loan from the Chinese government in late 2000. The zoo paid an estimated 10 million dollars for the 10-year loan. On July 9, 2005, a male panda cub was born at the zoo. It was the first surviving panda birth at the zoo and the product of artificial insemination by the zoo's reproductive research team. The cub was named Tai Shan ("Peaceful Mountain") on October 17, 100 days after his birth; the panda went without a name for its first hundred days, in observance of a Chinese custom. Tai Shan is property of the Chinese government and was scheduled to be sent to China after his second birthday, although that deadline was extended in 2007 by two years. Tai Shan left Washington, D.C., on February 4, 2010, and was taken to the Ya'an Bifengxia Panda Base, part of the Wolong nature reserve's panda conservation center.

On September 16, 2012, Mei Xiang gave birth to another cub, believed by zoo officials to have been a female, which died after about a week. Initial results from a necropsy (animal autopsy) revealed the abnormal presence of fluid in the abdomen and also discoloration of the liver (hepatic) tissue of unknown etiology; the cub had managed to nurse before death because milk was found in its system. Zoo officials said that, while upsetting, they (and, by extension, the public) can hope to learn more about giant panda breeding, reproduction, and health as a result, and will work closely and cooperatively with their Chinese colleagues during the inquiry.

In January 2011, Dennis Kelly, director of the National Zoo, and Zang Chunlin, secretary general of the China Wildlife Conservation Association, signed a new Giant Panda Cooperative Research and Breeding Agreement, extending the zoo's giant panda program for five more years, further cementing the two countries' commitment to the conservation of the species. The agreement, effective through December 5, 2015, stipulates that the zoo will conduct research in the areas of breeding and cub behavior. A new agreement was put in place December 7, 2015, and was in effect until December 7, 2020. In December 2020, the deal got extended until 2023.

Mei Xiang gave birth in August 2015 to two live cubs; the smaller one died a few days later (keepers had to care for it after Mei decided to focus on the larger cub). Sperm from both Tian Tian and another male giant panda based in a China preserve was used. It was determined on August 28, 2015, that both cubs were male and sired by Tian Tian. The larger, surviving cub was named Bei Bei ("precious treasure") on September 25, 2015. In celebration of a state visit, the name was selected by First Lady of the United States, Michelle Obama, and First Lady of the People's Republic of China, Peng Liyuan.

Bao Bao was healthy at that time, eating bamboo and special fruitsicle treats, having been separated from Mei at 18 months of age. She celebrated her second birthday in August 2015, shortly after the cubs were born. Her contract extended to August 2017. Bao Bao left the National Zoo on February 22, 2017, for the Dujiangyan base of the China Panda Conservation and Research Center.

In March 2020 shortly after the National Zoo closed due to the COVID-19 pandemic, Mei Xiang was artificially inseminated using only frozen sperm to avoid too much close contact. In August 2020, the National Zoo announced that Mei Xiang was pregnant. A few days after announcing that they had detected fetal tissue, the zoo tweeted a short video of an ultrasound showing a panda fetus. On August 21, Mei Xiang gave birth to a live male cub named Xiao Qi Ji, making her the oldest panda in the United States to give birth, at 22 years old. This meant the first success for this type of procedure.

On November 8, 2023, Mei Xiang, Tian Tian, and Xiao Qi Ji left the zoo and were transported in a Boeing 777F aircraft to the Chengdu Research Base of Giant Panda Breeding in China, ending their 23-year era at the zoo.

==== Bao Li and Qing Bao ====
On May 29, 2024, the zoo announced the acquirement of male Bao Li and female Qing Bao from the Shenshuping Base and Dujiangyan Base in China respectively. The pair arrived at the zoo on October 15, 2024, following a 19-hour flight from China. The Giant Pandas, Bao Li and Qing Bao will make their public debut on January 24, 2025, and zoo members can see Bao Li and Qing Bao early from January 10, 2025 - January 19, 2025. To feed the two pandas, the Zoo uses a "farm-to-table approach". Throughout the week, Zoo staff harvest bamboo from "undisclosed locations" in the Washington, D.C. area by hand, transport it to the Zoo, rinse and maintain its freshness with automatic water misters, and leave the bamboo at the pandas' preferred resting locations. The pandas sometimes prefer certain types of bamboo over others, so the staff always pick multiple species. Leftover bamboo is used to feed other herbivores at the Zoo. The pandas also receive "panda bread", a steamed mixture of "soybean, rice, and corn flours" developed in China.

== Special programs and events ==
The zoo holds annual fund raisers (ZooFari, Guppy Gala, and Boo at the Zoo) and free events (Sunset Serenades, Fiesta Musical). Proceeds support animal care, conservation science, education and sustainability at the National Zoo.

- Woo at the Zoo – A Valentine's Day (February 14) talk by some of the zoo's animal experts discussing animal dating, mating, and reproductive habits. All proceeds benefit the zoo's animal care program.
- Earth Day: Party for the Planet – Celebrating Earth Day at the National Zoo. Guests can learn simple daily actions they can take to enjoy a more environmentally friendly lifestyle.
- Easter Monday – Easter Monday has been a Washington-area multicultural tradition for many years. There is a variety of family activities, entertainment and special opportunities to learn more about the animals. Admission is free, and this event traditionally welcomes thousands of area families. The celebration began in response to the inability of African Americans to participate in the annual Easter Egg Roll held at the White House, until the Dwight Eisenhower presidency.
- Zoofari – A casual evening of gourmet foods, fine wines, entertainment and dancing under the stars. Each year, thousands of attendees enjoy delicacies prepared by master chefs from 100 of the D.C. area's finest restaurants. All proceeds benefit the zoo's animal care program.
- Brew at the Zoo – Guests can sample beer from a variety of microbreweries at the zoo. All proceeds benefit the zoo's animal care program.
- ZooFiesta – The zoo celebrates Hispanic Heritage Month with an annual fiesta at the National Zoo. Animal demonstrations, Hispanic and Latino music, costumed dancers, traditional crafts and Latin American foods are offered.

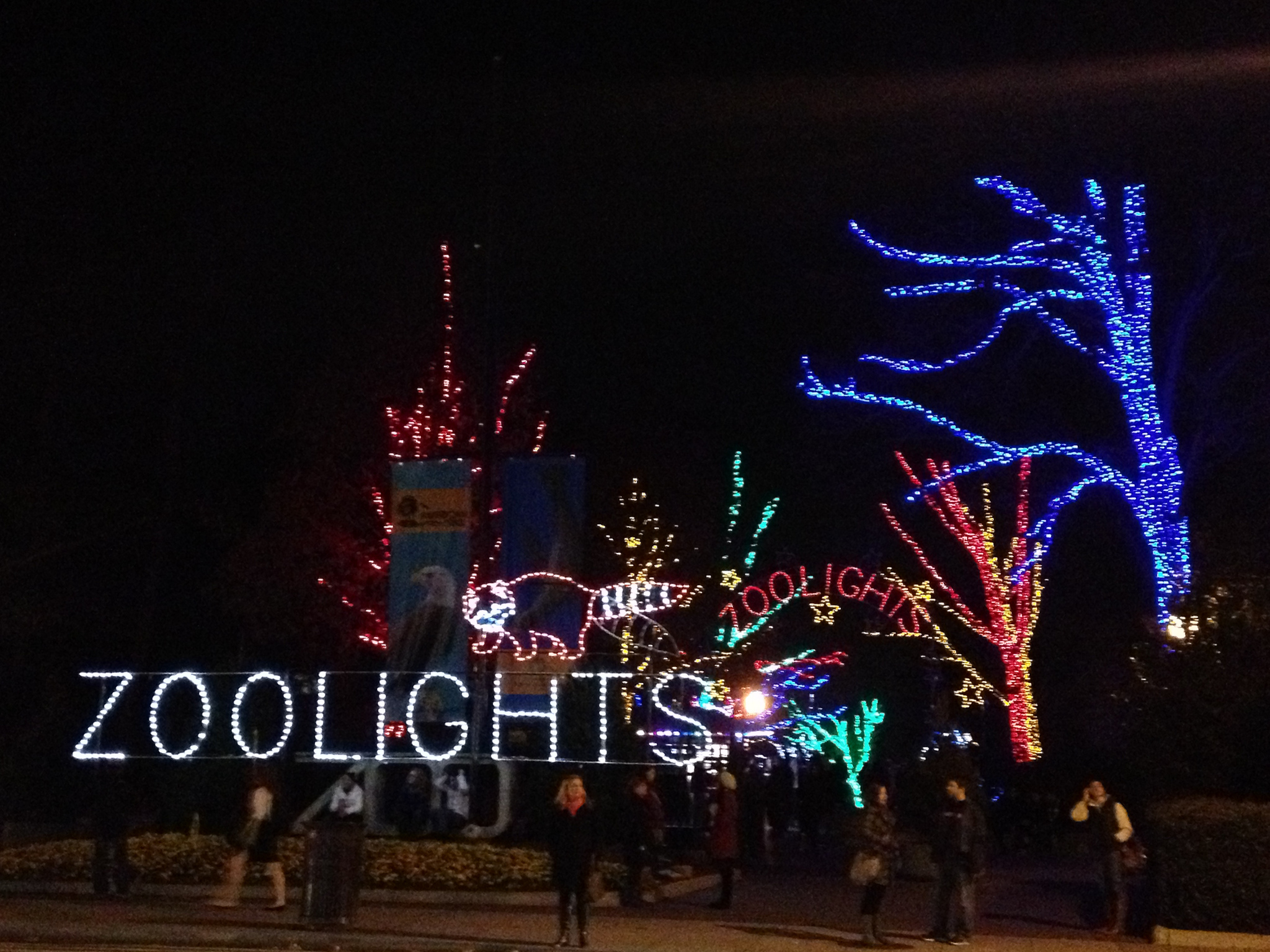
Zoolights event at the National Zoological Park in Washington, D.C.

- Rock-N-Roar – An event featuring live music, food and drink, and viewings of lion and tiger enrichment.
- Autumn Conservation Festival at Smithsonian Conservation Biology Institute (SCBI) – Visitors can talk with scientists one-on-one and learn about their research, and the tools and technology they use to understand animals and their environments. Guests can get behind-the-scenes looks at some of the SCBI's endangered animals.
- Boo at the Zoo – Families with children ages 2 to 12 trick-or-treat at the zoo and receive special treats from more than 40 treat stations. There are animal encounters, keeper talks and festive decorations. All proceeds benefit the zoo's animal care program.
- Zoolights – The National Zoo's annual winter celebration. Guests can walk through the zoo when it is covered with thousands of sparkling environmentally-friendly lights and animated exhibits, attend special keeper talks and enjoy live entertainment.

== Friends of the National Zoo ==
Friends of the National Zoo (FONZ) was a non-profit organization working in partnership with the National Zoological Park providing support to wildlife conservation programs at the zoo and around the world since 1958. Starting with Park Operations (guest services, retail and more), Education/Volunteer Services, as well as Membership Services, every area of FONZ works to raise money for the zoo, with $5 Zoo Guidebooks, rentals, souvenir purchases and memberships, with each being a tax write off. FONZ memberships offer free parking, discounts at the zoo's stores and restaurants, ride tickets, and a subscription to the Wild.Life., a magazine with the latest zoo news, research and photos.

FONZ has 60,000 members including about 30,000 families, largely in the Washington metropolitan area, and more than 1,000 volunteers. FONZ also offers weekend birthdays to members and seasonal day-camps through Education/Volunteer services, and a residential nature camp is offered at SCBI in Front Royal.

On February 4, 2021, the National Zoo announced that it was ending its 63-year partnership with FONZ. After the partnership ended, FONZ was relaunched as Conservation Nation, which is smaller and remotely-operated.

== Smithsonian Conservation Biology Institute ==
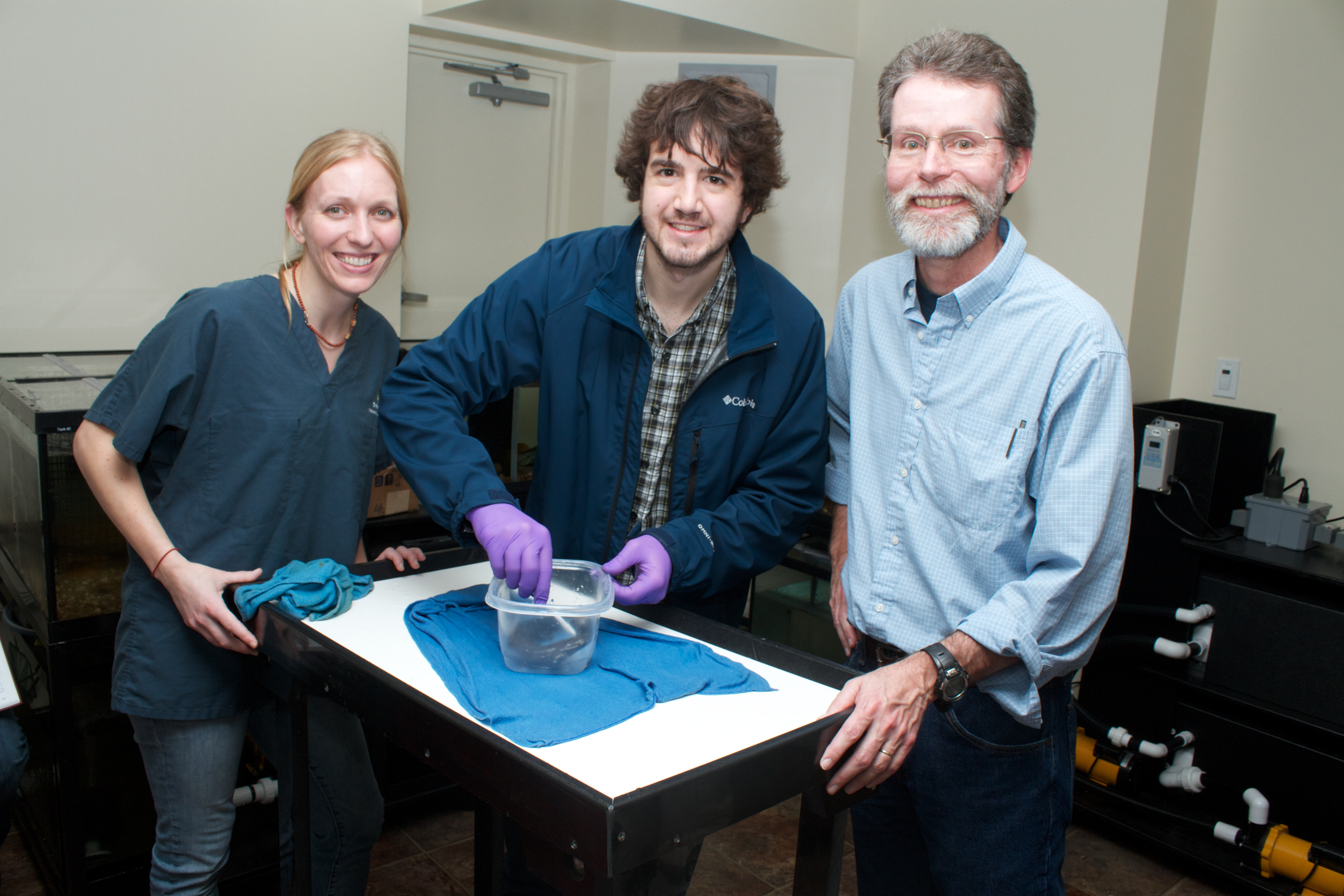
Kim Terrell (SCBI), Andy Loudon and Dr. Reid Harris (James Madison University) investigate the role of skin microbes and immune function under different climate scenarios

The Smithsonian established its Conservation Biology Institute (SCBI) in 2010 to serve as an umbrella for its global effort to conserve species and train future generations of conservationists. Headquartered in Front Royal, Virginia, the facility was previously known as the National Zoo's Conservation and Research Center.

The SCBI facilitates and promotes research programs based at Front Royal, at the National Zoo in Washington and at field research and training sites around the world. Its efforts support one of the four main goals of the Smithsonian's new strategic plan, which advances "understanding and sustaining a biodiverse planet."

Conservation biology is a field of science based on the premise that the conservation of biological diversity is important and benefits current and future human societies.

The Institute consists of six centers:

- Conservation Ecology Center (CEC): focuses on recovering and sustaining at-risk wildlife species and their supporting ecosystems in key marine and terrestrial regions throughout the globe.
- Migratory Bird Center: studies neotropical songbirds and wetland birds, the role of disease in bird population declines, and the environmental challenges facing urban and suburban birds. They also train professionals in environmental coffee certification throughout Latin America.
- Center for Species Survival (CSS): researches issues in reproductive physiology, endocrinology, cryobiology, embryo biology, animal behavior, wildlife toxicology and assisted reproduction. They strive to create knowledge that ensures self-sustaining populations in zoos and in the wild.
- Center for Conservation and Evolutionary Genetics (CCEG): works to understand and conserve biodiversity through genetic research, specializing in the genetic management of wild and captive animal populations, non-invasive and ancient DNA analyses, systematics, disease diagnosis and dynamics, genetic services to the zoo community, and application of genetic methods to animal behavior and ecology.
- Center for Conservation Education and Sustainability (CBES): teaches conservation principles and practices, finding ways to help scientists, managers, companies and industries become more environmentally responsible.
- Center for Wildlife Health and Husbandry Sciences: provides for the mental and physical well-being of every animal at the zoo through the complex endeavor of animal care.

== Incidents ==
- In 1983, a 16-year-old boy broke into the zoo and stole a venomous Gaboon viper. The boy "who was carrying the snakes in a plastic garbage bag, was bitten when he slung the sack over his shoulder as he stepped off a city bus." The zoo's antivenin supply was insufficient for treatment and more had to be rushed in from other zoos across the East Coast, including doses flown from the Bronx Zoo by the Civil Air Patrol.
- In March 1995, a homeless and mentally ill mother of three, Margaret Davis King, climbed into the lion's protected habitat and was discovered mauled to death early one Saturday morning.
- In 2002, the zoo's head veterinarian at the time, Dr. Suzan Murray, was accused of altering medical records. Murray responded that the software used "was not designed as a legal document, but rather as a user-friendly way of maintaining and sharing important information." The American Veterinary Medical Association (AVMA) specifically states "Without the express permission of the practice owner, it is unethical for a veterinarian to remove, copy, or use the medical records or any part of any record."
- In January 2003, red pandas died after eating rat poison that had been buried in their yard by a pest control contractor. The incident led the city of Washington, D.C., to seek to fine the zoo over its claim of federally granted immunity.
- In July 2003, a predator entered an exhibit and killed a bald eagle. Zoo officials later stated that the animal was likely killed by a red fox.
- In 2005, a three-year-old Sulawesi macaque named Ripley died in the Think Tank exhibit when two keepers closed a hydraulic door without realizing the monkey was in the doorway.
- In January 2005, the National Academy of Sciences released its final report on a two-year investigation into animal care and management at the National Zoo. The committee found that most animals were well cared-for, and there was little to question regarding large mammal deaths from 1999 to 2003. Their evaluation suggested "that the publicized animal deaths were not indicative of a wider, undiscovered problem with animal care". The problems at the zoo, which culminated with Director Lucy Spelman's resignation, included facility and budget shortcomings, although the animal care problems were prominently highlighted. The zoo added a new head pathologist and other veterinarians.
- In January 2006, the National Zoo euthanized an Asian elephant named Toni. The elephant had been suffering from arthritis and poor body conditions. Animal rights groups alleged that inadequate care led to her death.
- In December 2006, a clouded leopard escaped from its exhibit at the Asia Trail due to faulty fencing. It was recaptured.
- During the night of May 3, 2022, a wild red fox from Rock Creek Park entered an enclosure through a baseball-sized hole and killed 25 flamingos and a Northern pintail duck, and injured 3 other flamingos.

== See also ==
- Perry Lions – the lion statues on the Taft Bridge
