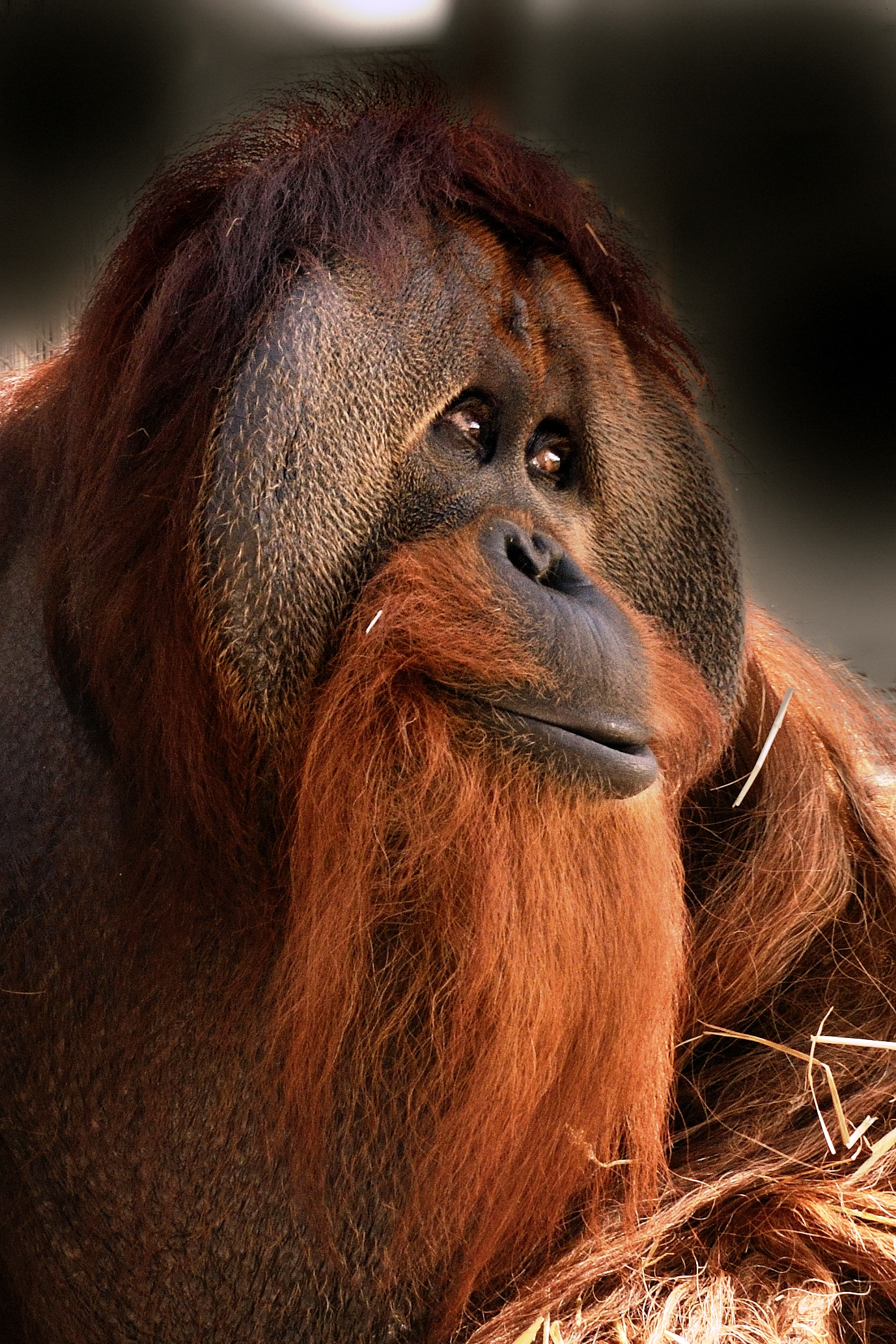
- Azy, the hybrid orangutan at the Indianapolis Zoo.

Scientific classification
- Kingdom: Animalia
- Phylum: Chordata
- Class: Mammalia
- Order: Primates
- Superfamily: Hominoidea
- Family: Hominidae
- Subfamily: Ponginae
- Genus: Pongo
- Species: P. pygmaeus × P. abelii

= Hybrid orangutan =

Hybrid ape

A hybrid orangutan or cocktail orangutan is usually an orangutan derived from interbreeding between any of the three orangutan species: Bornean (Pongo pygmaeus), Sumatran (Pongo abelii) and Tapanuli (Pongo tapanuliensis), but the term "hybrid orangutan" could also refer to hybrids of the three known Bornean subspecies. As of 2015, there are approximately 134 living Bornean x Sumatran hybrid orangutans in captivity.

== Hybrids in captivity ==
Before Bornean and Sumatran orangutans were described as separate species in the early 2000s, orangutans from differing species were paired in captivity, and produced hybrid offspring. In 1985, the Orangutan SSP within the American Association of Zoos and Aquariums (AZA) issued a moratorium on the breeding of Sumatran x Bornean hybrids. In 1994, it was recommended that those hybrids should be sterilised if they are housed in a situation where breeding may happen. The Tapanuli orangutan was not described as a separate species until 2017, which led to some interbreeding between Sumatran and Tapanuli orangutans in captivity. In 2022, an orangutan named Bubbles, who was previously thought to be Sumatran, was found to be Tapanuli, making her offspring hybrids of both the Sumatran and Tapanuli species. It is possible that there are still many undiscovered Sumatran x Tapanuli hybrids in captivity. Bornean orangutans have three known subspecies: P. p morio, P. p pygmaeus and P.p wurmbii. In captivity, these subspecies are housed together and not managed at a subspecies level. After many generations of hybridisation, there are likely very few “pure” individuals left.

== Hybrids in Borneo ==
From 1971 to 1985, 90 orphaned or displaced orangutans rescued from illegal wildlife trade were released into Tanjung Puting National Park in Central Kalimantan. A subsequent genetic survey determined that at least two orangutans, captured in a different region and therefore not native to the park, had prolifically interbred with the local native apes, and produced at least 22 hybridized descendants.
