= January 1978 =

Month of 1978

<<	January 1978					>>
Su	Mo	Tu	We	Th	Fr	Sa
1	2	3	4	5	6	7
8	9	10	11	12	13	14
15	16	17	18	19	20	21
22	23	24	25	26	27	28
29	30	31

The following events occurred in January 1978:

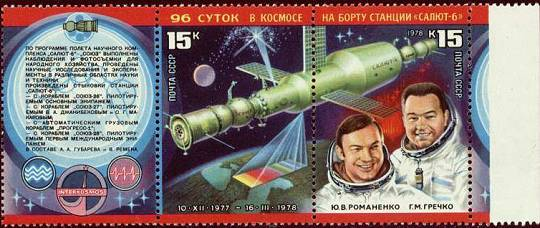
January 10, 1978: First linkup of three spacecraft in orbit is made as Soyuz 26, Soyuz 27 and Salyut 6 space station are linked

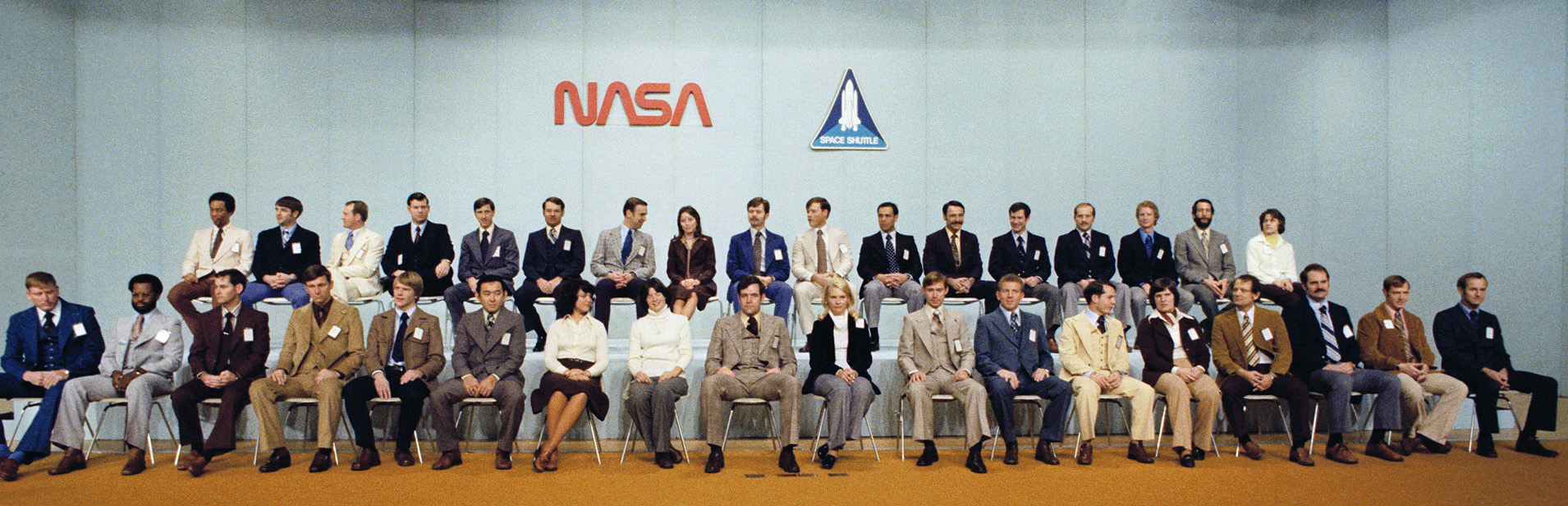
January 16, 1978: NASA introduces its first Space Shuttle astronauts, including first women and black NASA trainees

== January 1, 1978 (Sunday) ==
- Air India Flight 855, a Boeing 747 passenger jet, crashed off the coast of Bombay, killing all 213 people on board. The 747 had taken off from Mumbai on a scheduled flight to Dubai in the United Arab Emirates and disintegrated in mid-air minutes after takeoff.
- The government of Vietnam accused Democratic Kampuchea (formerly Cambodia) of sending troops deep into Vietnamese territory and killing or wounding thousands of civilians. The statement on Radio Vietnam declared that the Kampuchean troops had fired shells into large areas of dense population.
- Born: Philip Mulryne, Northern Irish footballer with 27 caps as a midfielder for the Northern Ireland national team, as well as being a Dominican friar and Roman Catholic priest; in Belfast

== January 2, 1978 (Monday) ==
- In American college football, with the major bowl games being held on the day after New Year's Day because of an NCAA ban on playing football on Sunday, the #1-ranked Texas Longhorns were defeated by the #5-ranked Fighting Irish of Notre Dame, 38 to 10, in the Cotton Bowl. In the evening, the #2-ranked Oklahoma Sooners, poised to claim the top ranking in the Associated Press and United Press International polls and the national championship, lost to the #6 Arkansas Razorbacks, 31 to 6, in the Orange Bowl. While #3 Alabama defeated #9 Ohio State in the Sugar Bowl, 35 to 6, #4 Michigan lost to the #13 Washington Huskies, 27 to 20 in the Rose Bowl. The three upsets left open the question of whether the AP and UPI polls would choose Alabama, Notre Dame or Arkansas as the number one team in the United States.

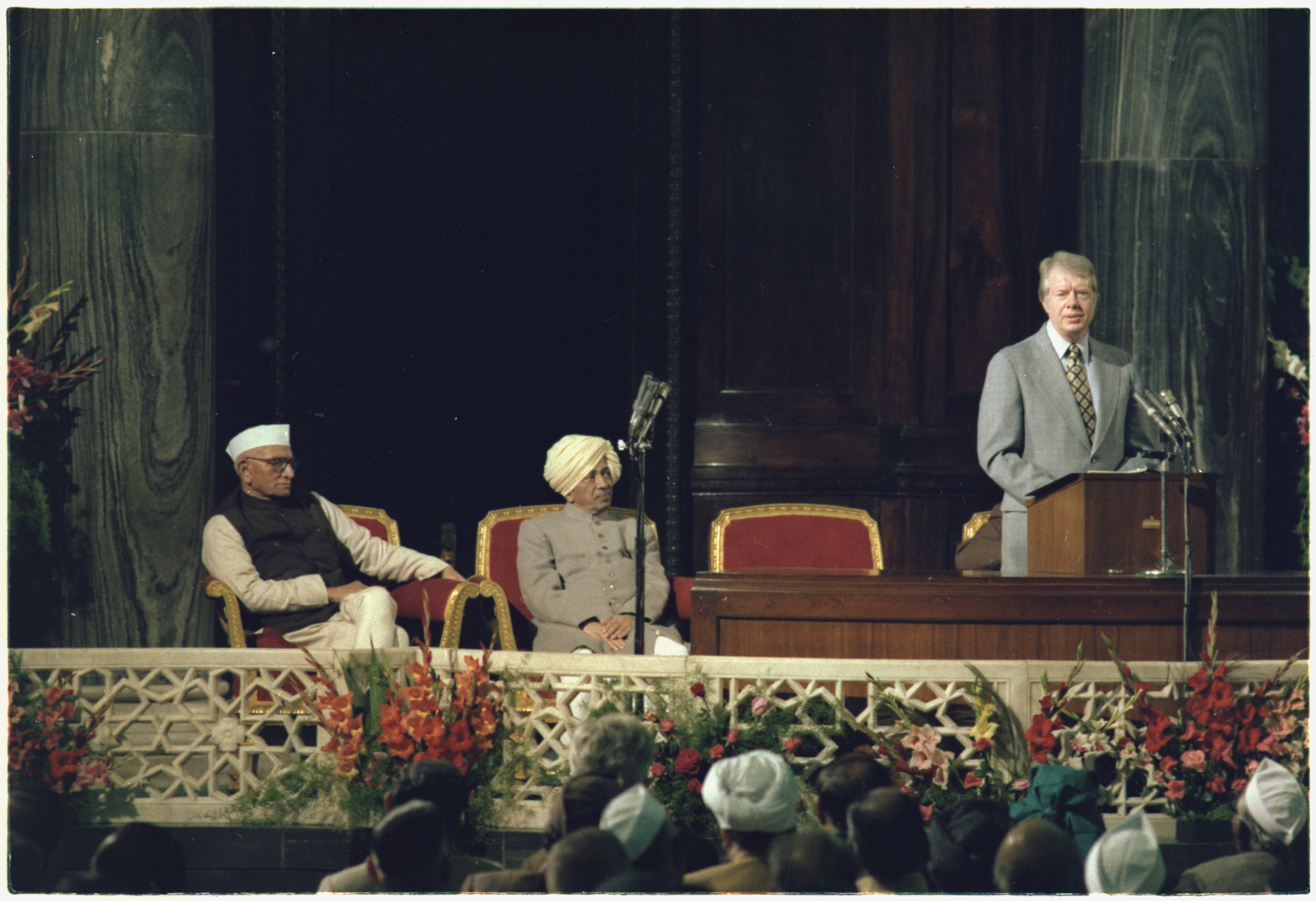
Jimmy Carter addresses the Indian Parliament

- U.S. President Jimmy Carter addressed the Parliament of India and announced that the United States would send nuclear fuel to India for a reactor and would aid the nation in economic development.
- Born: Karina Smirnoff, Ukrainian-born American dancer; in Kharkov, Ukrainian SSR, Soviet Union
- Died: Cyril King, 56, Governor of the U.S. Virgin Islands since 1975, died of stomach cancer.

== January 3, 1978 (Tuesday) ==
- Former Indian Prime Minister Indira Gandhi was expelled by the Congress Party that she had led, after the executive board, the Congress Working Committee, resolved to get rid of her because of the defeat of the party in the March 1977 elections. The Nehru family, Jawaharlal Nehru and his daughter, Indira, had controlled the party for almost 30 years.
- A fire in a Chinese temple in Manila killed 11 people in the Philippines. The dead were finishing the celebration of the feast of Tsu Su Kong, an ancient Chinese god, on the third floor of the temple when the fire broke out, apparently caused by candles setting fire to decorations.
- U.S. President Jimmy Carter, on a tour of India, visited the village of Daulatpur Nasirabad in Haryana state, where his mother Lillian Carter had previously worked while in the Peace Corps. In honor of President Carter's visit, the village government renamed the village "Carterpuri". By 1998, many residents wanted to restore the village to its former name.
- Voters in the Associated Press poll of sportswriters and in the United Press International poll of coaches both selected Notre Dame as their choice for the number one team in college football for the 1977 season as recognized by the NCAA, with Alabama a close second in voting. In the AP Poll, the Fighting Irish edged the Crimson Tide by a margin of 1,180 points to 1,132 while in the UPI Poll, Notre Dame finished ahead, 365 points to 354.

== January 4, 1978 (Wednesday) ==
- Voters in Chile overwhelmingly endorsed the policies of President Augusto Pinochet in a special referendum after the United Nations had cited numerous human rights violations since General Pinochet led the overthrow of President Salvador Allende in 1973. Pinochet told a national audience that there would be no more elections in Chile for at least 10 years, and said that the message sent to the UN was "We don't want you to say that you want to examine us. Never again."
- The People's Republic of China announced that the Communist Party had approved making it easier for its citizens to travel outside the nation.
- Born: Karine Ruby, French snowboarder and 1998 Olympic gold medalist in the giant slalom, as well as six world championship gold medals; in Bonneville, Haute-Savoie département (killed in a mountain climbing accident, 2009)

== January 5, 1978 (Thursday) ==
- All 74 people aboard the Indian freighter Chandragupta disappeared in the Pacific Ocean after sending a radio message that the ship was taking on water and that the 68 crew and six family members were abandoning the ship in life rafts. The Chandragupta had departed from Portland, Oregon on December 28 with a cargo of wheat and reported its position as 1,000 miles (1,600 km) northwest of Honolulu. On January 10, an air search spotted one of the life rafts but the U.S. Coast Guard cutter Mellon found that the raft was capsized and empty, with no survivors or bodies found.
- Bülent Ecevit, of CHP, formed the new government as Prime Minister of Turkey. The 35-member cabinet included 22 members of Ecevit's Republican People's Party and 10 members of the Justice Party of former Prime Minister Suleyman Demirel.
- Brazil's President Ernesto Geisel announced to the National Renovating Alliance that he had chosen General João Figueiredo to succeed him as the South American nation's next president.

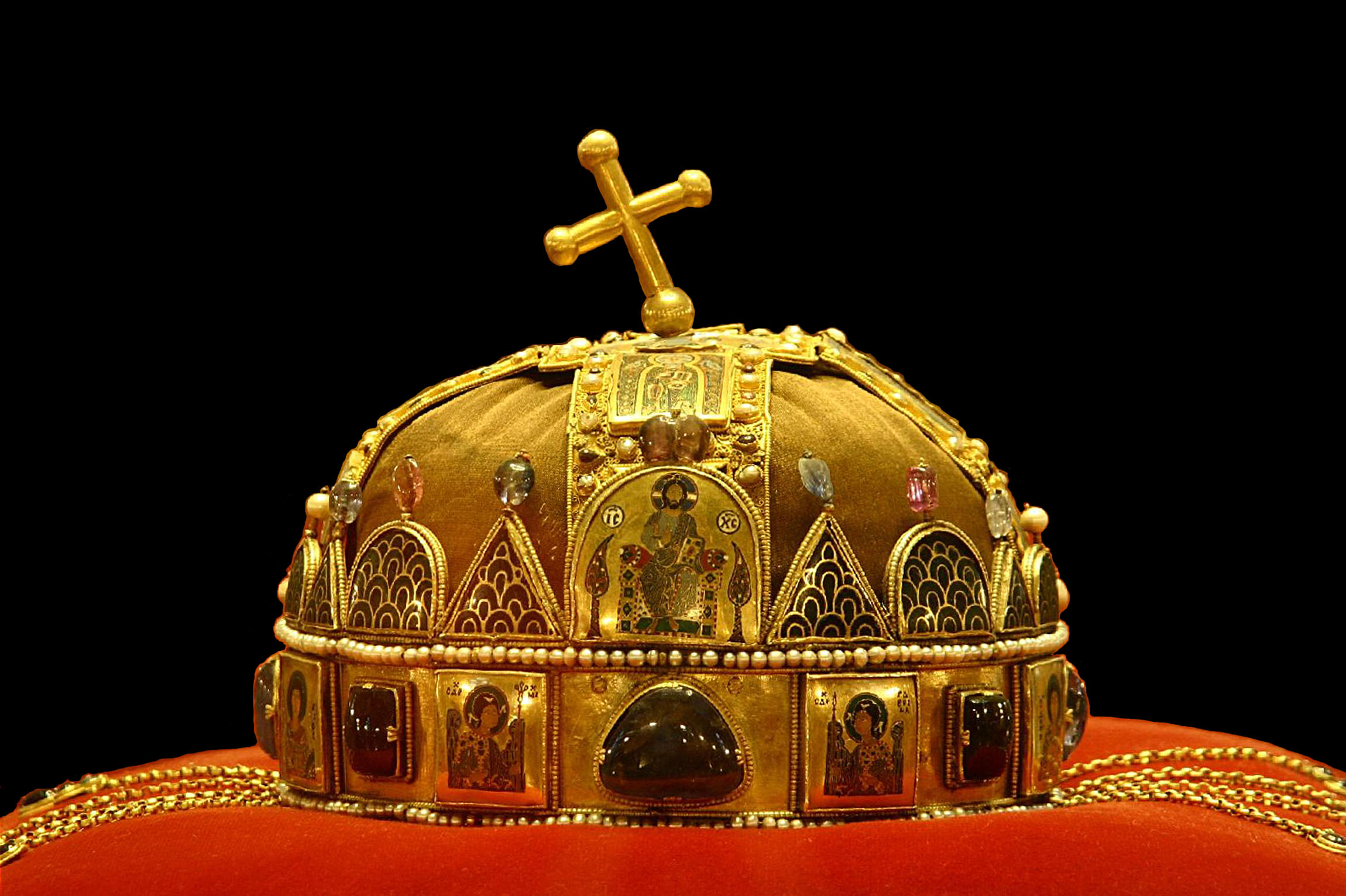
The Crown of St. Stephen

- The Crown of St. Stephen (also known as the Holy Crown of Hungary) arrived back in Hungary from the United States, where it had been held since World War II. A U.S. Air Force jet landed in Budapest with a "huge metallic crate containing the crown jewels" as a Hungarian military band played the Communist nation's anthem.
- Born: January Jones, American TV actress known for Mad Men; in Sioux Falls, South Dakota

== January 6, 1978 (Friday) ==
- U.S. Secretary of State Cyrus R. Vance formally turned over the Crown of St. Stephen to the Hungarian government in a 30-minute ceremony. Vance presented a letter from U.S. President Carter, who wrote, "It is with a genuine sense of pride that I am able to return to the people of Hungary this priceless treasure, which the United States has been privileged to shelter since the terrible devastation of the Second World War."
- Died:
  - John D. MacArthur, 80, American insurance entrepreneur, philanthropist and billionaire. MacArthur's will provided funding for the John D. and Catherine T. MacArthur Foundation and the MacArthur Fellows Program which annually awards what is nicknamed the "Genius Grant" to individuals who have shown "extraordinary originality and dedication in their creative pursuits and a marked capacity for self-direction" and are citizens or residents of the United States.
  - Burt Munro, 78, New Zealand motorcycle racer

== January 7, 1978 (Saturday) ==
- Emilio Marcos Palma became the first known person to be born on the continent of Antarctica. Emilio's mother, Silvia Morella de Palma, was flown to Argentina's Esperanza Base Graham Land, where the South American nation had made a claim to the Argentine Antarctic territory and where Emilio's father, Argentine Army Captain Jorge Emilio Palma, was stationed.
- Iran and Red and Black Colonization, an article from the Ettela'at newspaper published by the Minister of information Dariush Homayoon attacks Ayatollah Khomeini by describing him as a foreign agent.

== January 8, 1978 (Sunday) ==
- Rick Turner, 36, a prominent white South African anti-apartheid activist and a professor of political science at the University of Natal, was struck and killed by a bullet shot through the window of his home in Bellair, a suburb of Durban.
- Died: Rose Halprin, 81, American Zionist leader and President of the Hadassah Women's Zionist Organization of America

== January 9, 1978 (Monday) ==
Flag of the Commonwealth of the Northern Mariana Islands

- At 11:00 in the morning local time, the Commonwealth of the Northern Mariana Islands, with 15,000 residents on 16 remote islands totaling 184 square miles (480 km^{2}), became a territory within the United States. The Marianas were the first territory added to the U.S. since 1917, when the U.S. Virgin Islands were purchased from Denmark. Dr. Carlos S. Camacho took office on the same day at the capital, Saipan, as the first Governor of the new Commonwealth.
- Protests breakout in the Iranian city of Qom against the shah of Iran, Mohammad Reza Pahlavi. The protest began as a response to the publication of Iran and Red and Black Colonization, an article from the newspaper Ettela'at that attacked Ayatollah Khomeini 2 days earlier. The protest in Qom symbolized the growing opposition to the Shah's authoritarian rule and set the stage for the Iranian Revolution of 1979, which ultimately led to the overthrow of the Shah and the establishment of the Islamic Republic of Iran.
- Born:
  - Gennaro Gattuso, Italian footballer with 73 caps as a midfielder for the national team, later the manager for AC Milan; in Corigliano Calabro
  - Chad Johnson, American pro football NFL wide receiver who legally changed his name to "Chad Ochocinco", 2006 NFL receiving yards leader; in Miami
  - AJ McLean, American singer and a founding member of the Backstreet Boys pop music group; in West Palm Beach, Florida
- Died: Robert D. Murphy, 83, American diplomat

== January 10, 1978 (Tuesday) ==
- Pedro Joaquín Chamorro Cardenal, 53, editor and publisher of the Managua newspaper La Prensa, as well as a critic of Nicaraguan President Anastasio Somoza Debayle, was assassinated. Chamorro was driving to work in Managua when another vehicle blocked his car. Gunmen stepped out of the second car and shot Chamorro in the face, and he died an hour later. The next day, a crowd of 50,000 people walked 8 miles (13 km) with Chamorro's glass-topped coffin to his home, in a Managua suburb in "the largest public demonstration in more than a decade."
- The Soviet space mission Soyuz 27 was launched from Baikonur with two cosmonauts toward the Salyut 6 orbiting space station. Traveling on Soyuz 27 were the mission commander, Soviet Air Force Lieutenant Colonel Vladimir Dzhanibekov, and veteran cosmonaut and flight engineer Oleg Makarov, who had flown on Soyuz 12. Soyuz 27 docked with the space station and joined Soyuz 26 cosmonauts Yuri Romanenko and Georgy Grechko, who had been on Salyut 6 since December 10.

== January 11, 1978 (Wednesday) ==
- The first double linkup, with two separate spacecraft docking to a space station, took place as Soyuz 27, with cosmonauts Dzhanibekov and Makarov, connected to the Salyut 6 station, which had two docking ports. Soyuz 26, with cosmonauts Romanenko and Grechko, had been docked to the other port since December.
- Born: Emile Heskey, English footballer with 62 caps as a striker for the England national team; in Leicester
- Died: Samuel S. Leibowitz, 84, American defense attorney known for representing both Al Capone and the Scottsboro Boys, later a New York City judge and an unsuccessful candidate for mayor of New York.

== January 12, 1978 (Thursday) ==
- In the largest protest against the government of Nicaragua in more than 20 years, rioting began in Managua, as angry protesters set businesses and cars on fire two days after the assassination of Pedro Chamorro, while others blocked firefighters from reaching the blazes, or reset fires that had been extinguished.
- At the 72nd annual convention of the athletic directors of the National Collegiate Athletic Association (NCAA), the intercollegiate sports body approved a proposal to split the 144 NCAA Division I college football participants into Division I-A for larger universities that offered scholarships for at least 12 varsity sports, and Division I-AA. Universities in the seven big conferences (at the time, the Pacific 10 (Pac 10), the Western Athletic (WAC) the Big 8, the Southwest (SWC), the Big 10, the Southeastern (SEC) and the Atlantic Coast (ACC)) and some major independents, such as Notre Dame, were assigned to Division I-A.
- Born: Hannah Gadsby, Australian LGBTQ comedian known for the Emmy Award winning Hannah Gadsby: Nanette; in Burnie, Tasmania
- Died: Lee Metcalf, 66, U.S. Senator for Montana since 1961, was found dead in his apartment in Helena.

== January 13, 1978 (Friday) ==
- In sworn testimony before U.S. prosecutors, South Korean lobbyist Tongsun Park implicated five former U.S. Representatives of having received hundreds of thousands of dollars from him. The American prosecutors came to Seoul to question Park, who specifically identified Otto E. Passman of Louisiana as the person whom he paid almost $200,000 and testified that he provided more than $100,000 to Richard T. Hanna of California and Cornelius E. Gallagher of New Jersey. Passman, Hanna and Gallagher were all Democrats. William Minshall, a Republican of Ohio, had allegedly been provided $80,000, and Edwin W. Edwards, a Democrat of Louisiana who was the current Governor of Louisiana at the time of Park's testimony, was accused of receiving $20,000.
- Born: Major Mohit Sharma, Indian Army officer posthumously awarded the Ashoka Chakra medal for rescuing two fellow service members fighting insurgents; in Rohtak, Haryana state (killed 2009)

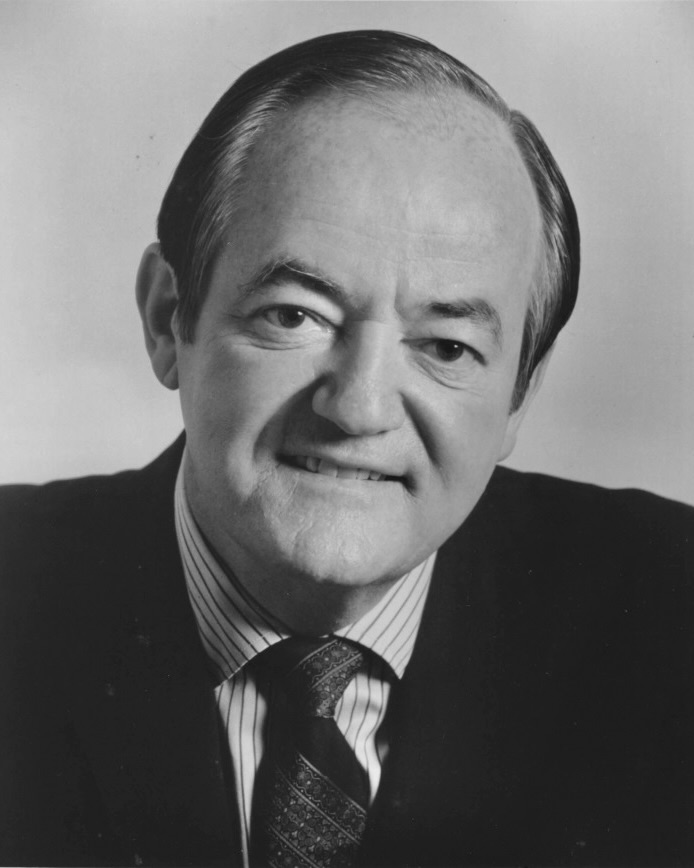
Humphrey in 1971

- Died: Hubert Humphrey, 66, Vice President of the U.S. from 1965 to 1969, Democratic nominee for the 1968 U.S. presidential election, and U.S Senator for Minnesota from 1959 to 1964 and 1971 until his death, formerly a pharmacist, died of bladder cancer. Humphrey, who regularly called political leaders regarding policy until a few days before his death, became only the 25th person to receive a state funeral in the United States Capitol rotunda.

== January 14, 1978 (Saturday) ==
- A 7.0 magnitude earthquake struck off the coast of Japan at 12:24 p.m. local time and killed at least 16 people and left 16 more missing. The quake struck Kanagawa Prefecture on the Izu peninsula, where thousands of vacationers were staying during a three-day weekend. At the Izu peninsula, nine people were killed and nine others were missing after the quake, while three other persons died in the town of Hakone, where the quake dislodged an 80-inch (2,000 mm) diameter boulder that struck a bus carrying 38 people, and a landslide buried four homes.
- Born: Shawn Crawford, U.S. Olympic sprinter and 2004 gold medalist in the 200m race, 2001 world champion; in Van Wyck, South Carolina
- Died: Kurt Gödel, 71, German mathematician, philosopher and logician known for Gödel's completeness theorem, died of self-imposed starvation.

== January 15, 1978 (Sunday) ==
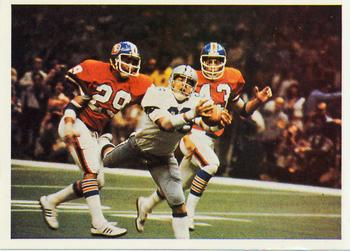
Super Bowl XII

- The Dallas Cowboys defeated the Denver Broncos, 27 to 10, to win Super Bowl XII, the championship of the National Football League. One reporter called the mistake-filled game "mostly an unprofessional match in which the new world champions made almost as many mistakes as the other team" and "a game that for the most part embarrassed the pro league and its two best teams."
- Two days of voting began in Finland in the first presidential election in 10 years. Of the electoral college of 300 people, 260 electoral votes from seven different parties were awarded to President Urho Kekkonen and the remaining 40 were split among three other parties. Of the popular vote, President Kekkonen received more than two million of almost 2.5 million votes cast. On February 15, the electors cast their votes with Kekkonen receiving 260 and Raino Westerholm of the Finnish Christian League (Suomen Kristillinen Liitto or SKL) a distant second with 25.
- In a referendum in Ecuador on whether to approve a new constitution, in protest over not having the option to return to the prior constitution of 1946, more than 450,000 people cast blank votes. As a result, the remaining votes that were counted were almost 779,000 in favor of the constitution, even though more than one million (more than 62 percent) were not in favor.
- Serial killer Ted Bundy broke into the Chi Omega sorority house at Florida State University in Tallahassee and beat four women with a club while they were sleeping, killing two of them and leaving the other two in critical condition. Before coming to the Chi Omega house, Bundy had attacked another student who lived off campus, three blocks away. Bundy, who had escaped from a Colorado jail on December 31, committed one more murder on February 9 and would be arrested on February 15 in Pensacola, Florida, after stopped for driving a car that had been reported stolen, and found to have credit cards in the names of two of the Florida State students.
- Born: Eddie Cahill, American TV actor known for CSI:NY; in the Bronx, New York
- Died: Sonny Easley, American stock car racer, was killed along with Douglas Gruntz, the mechanic for another driver, when his car went out of control at the Riverside Raceway in California.

== January 16, 1978 (Monday) ==
- NASA, the U.S. space agency, announced its first selection since 1969 of astronauts for training, picking 35 people, including the first women and the first non-white people to be members of the astronaut corps. Of the group, 15 were pilots (all men) to train for the new Space Shuttle, and 20 others for the new position of mission specialist. Among those selected were the first American woman in space (Sally Ride, June 18, 1983, STS-7); the first African-American in space (Guion Bluford, August 30, 1983, STS-8); and the first Asian-American in space (Ellison Onizuka, January 24, 1985, STS-51-C). The new astronauts of Group 8 were introduced at a press conference on January 31. Of the group, four (Scobee, Onizuka, Judith Resnik and Ronald McNair) would be killed in the 1986 explosion of the Space Shuttle Challenger (STS-51-L).
- Protected by armed police and dogs, workers with bulldozers began demolition of Unibell, a shantytown of 2,000 shacks erected by squatters and inhabited by 15,000 black people in Cape Town, South Africa. Some of the displaced people set fire to their own shacks. The demolition order came after the city government described the shantytown to be both illegal and unsanitary, and the black squatters were directed to return to their bantustans, tribal homelands that had been created for the majority black South African population by the white-minority government.
- A new version of the Moscow–Washington hotline began operation on teletypes machines in the White House and the Kremlin, as transmissions were made by satellite communications rather than by the cable that had been in use since 1963. In order to prevent an interruption in service (which had happened accidentally at least three times before) the system relied on five satellites, four of which were on the Soviet Union's Molniya system and one of which was on the U.S. Intelsat system. Relay of messages was aided by six Earth stations, with two in the United States and four in the Soviet Union.
- Soyuz 27 cosmonauts Vladimir Dzanibekov and Oleg Makarov returned to Earth after completing their delivery of new supplies (including space suits, flight couches and personalized gear) to the Salyut 6 space station.
- Born: Vijay Sethupathi, Indian actor and film producer, winner of the 2019 National Film Award for Best Supporting Actor in Super Deluxe; in Rajapalayam, Tamil Nadu state

== January 17, 1978 (Tuesday) ==
- Color television was introduced to the South American nation of Peru, making its debut on TV Perú Channel 7 in Lima, on the same day the Peruvian government approved color broadcasts.
- Philippine President Ferdinand Marcos announced the first elections in more than five years, declaring that voting would be held for a National Assembly of 120 members on April 2.
- Born: Porochista Khakpour, Iranian-born American novelist, author of Sons and Other Flammable Objects; in Tehran

== January 18, 1978 (Wednesday) ==
- The European Court of Human Rights in Strasbourg found the British government guilty of mistreating prisoners in Northern Ireland, citing "inhuman and degrading treatment" in 1971 based on a complaint from the Republic of Ireland of the "five techniques" used by prison officials. The Court ruled, 13 to 4, that Britain's five techniques (continuous noise, sleep deprivation, forced prolonged standing, wearing of hoods, and limiting feeding to occasional bread and water) did not amount to torture. The case was the first between two nations to reach a decision since the Court's founding in 1959.
- Egypt's President Anwar Sadat halted all peace discussions with Israel and summoned his team of negotiators, headed by Foreign Minister Mohammed Ibrahim Kamel, back to Cairo from Jerusalem. Kamel informed Israel's Prime Minister Menahem Begin that the halt in peace talks was a result of remarks that Begin had made during a banquet the night before, apparently directed at Kamel himself.
- The roof of the Hartford Civic Center in Connecticut collapsed at 4:19 in the morning under the weight of heavy snow, a little less than six hours after the University of Connecticut men's team defeated the University of Massachusetts, 56-49, in a college basketball game attended by over 4,000 spectators.
- A U.S. Navy A-7 carrier plane inadvertently dropped three 500-pound (230 kg) bombs on the Navy tugboat USS Cree off of the coast of California, after mistaking the vessel for an old ship to be used for target practice. Two of the bombs detonated alongside the Cree and caused slight damage. The third bomb fell directly on USS Cree but failed to explode.

== January 19, 1978 (Thursday) ==
- The Supreme Court of Canada voted, 5 to 4, to reverse a 1976 appellate court decision holding that Canada's provinces had no power to censor films.
- U.S. President Carter delivered his first State of the Union speech before a joint session of Congress, speaking at the close of his first year in office. One reviewer noted the blandness of the speech, commenting that "Carter avoided the kind of dramatic new proposals that other Presidents in similar circumstances have put before legislators of their own party."
- U.S. television executive Fred Silverman, whose programming decisions as president of ABC Entertainment had lifted the American Broadcasting Company from last place to becoming the most-watched commercial network in the United States, resigned from ABC to accept the task of lifting the NBC network out of last place. Announcement of his departure came from ABC Television president Frederick S. Pierce, and an official with NBC confirmed that Silverman's hiring as NBC Television president would be announced the following day.

== January 20, 1978 (Friday) ==
- After having sent two cosmonauts to the Salyut 6 space station a week earlier to bring supplies, the Soviet Union launched Progress 1, the first supply spaceship with no crew, to carry additional supplies to the station. Guided from ground control, the robot ship docked with the space lab and the crew unloaded its cargo of a month's supply of fuel, and life support and scientific equipment.
- In southern Africa, Rhodesia's white minority government announced an amnesty program for any black nationalist guerrillas who voluntarily surrendered, as part of its negotiations with the two organizations fighting for black majority rule for the nation that would soon become Zimbabwe.
- Born: Omar Sy, French film actor and the first black recipient of the César Award for Best Actor, co-star of The Intouchables; in Trappes, Yvelines département

== January 21, 1978 (Saturday) ==
- In a bout between the two rival lightweight boxing world champions, Roberto Duran of the World Boxing Association (WBA) knocked down Esteban de Jesús of the World Boxing Council (WBC) in the 12th round in front of a crowd of 4,500 people at the sports pavilion of Caesars Palace in Las Vegas and thousands of others watching on pay-per-view television.
- Died:
  - Oleksa Hirnyk, 65, Soviet Ukrainian nationalist and engineer, set himself on fire in a protest of the Soviet Union's suppression of the Ukrainian language and the USSR's ongoing process of "Russification". The Soviet government suppressed any news of Hirnyk's self-immolation and the protest would not be revealed until the collapse of the Soviet Union in 1993.
  - William Girdler, 40, American film director and screenwriter known for the 1976 horror film Grizzly, was killed in a helicopter crash in the Philippines along with producer Patrick Allan Kelly, Filipino film executive Dennis Jovan, and pilot Jess Garcia. Girdler was scouting filming locations for a film about drug smuggling when the helicopter struck a power line near Pagsanjan, the filming site used earlier for Apocalypse Now. The body was flown from Manila to Los Angeles where a memorial service was set to be held. His remains were later flown to Louisville, where he was buried in Cave Hill Cemetery.

== January 22, 1978 (Sunday) ==
- Ethiopia declared the ambassador of West Germany persona non grata.
- Died: Herbert Sutcliffe, 83, English cricketer who represented England in international competition from 1924 to 1933, inducted to the International Cricket Council Hall of Fame

== January 23, 1978 (Monday) ==
- French and Belgian industrialist Édouard-Jean Empain, CEO of the Empain-Schneider electrical equipment company, was kidnapped in Paris by four armed men from the radical Noyaux armés pour l'autonomie populaire (NAPAP, "Armed Cells for Popular Autonomy), who forced his limousine off the road, beat his chauffeur and took away one of the wealthiest men in Europe. The group would hold Empain hostage for 63 days before releasing him after one of the kidnappers was arrested while trying to collect the ransom.
- Franconia College in Franconia, New Hampshire, founded in 1963, ceased operations immediately upon filing bankruptcy and discharged its students and faculty, two days prior to the January 25 start of its spring semester. The experimental liberal arts college, nicknamed "the hippie college on the hill" and described by one critic as "a child of the 60s, a creation of and for what used to be called the counterculture," issued no grades, and had no formal curriculum.
- Died:
  - Terry Kath, 31, guitarist for the rock band Chicago, accidentally shot himself in the head.
  - Jack Oakie, 74, American film actor best known for The Great Dictator, portraying a parody of Benito Mussolini (Benzino Napaloni of Bacteria) opposite Charlie Chaplin's parody of Adolf Hitler (Adenold Hynkel of Tomainia).

== January 24, 1978 (Tuesday) ==
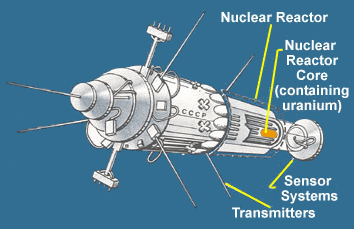
Diagram of Kosmos 954

- The Soviet satellite Kosmos 954 burned up in Earth's atmosphere, scattering radioactive debris over Canada's Northwest Territories. A group of six wildlife researchers found the site of the impact four days later near an airplane landing strip at Warden's Grove, with a crater at least six feet (2 meters) wide.
- By Executive Order, U.S. President Carter imposed multiple restrictions on American intelligence agencies, with most upon the Central Intelligence Agency (CIA), but also the Federal Bureau of Investigation, prohibiting wiretapping, searches, mail opening, or surveillance without a warrant from a federal court. An exception to the warrant was provided if the U.S. Attorney General made a determination of "probable cause to believe that the subject is an agent of a foreign power."
- Rose Dugdale and Eddie Gallagher became the first convicted prisoners to marry in prison since the establishment of the Republic of Ireland.

== January 25, 1978 (Wednesday) ==
- The Great Blizzard of 1978 struck the Ohio Valley and Great Lakes, killing 90 people over three days.
- Born: Volodymyr Zelenskyy, President of Ukraine since 2019, as well as a former comedian and TV producer known for the TV series Sluha naroda as "President Vasily Petrovych Goloborodko"; in Krivoy Rog, Ukrainian SSR, Soviet Union

== January 26, 1978 (Thursday) ==
- The International Ultraviolet Explorer (IUE), the first orbiting observatory designed primarily for ultraviolet astronomy, was launched from Cape Canaveral in the U.S. as a collaborative project between NASA, the United Kingdom Space Research Council (UKSRC) and the European Space Research Organisation (ESRO). Designed to last for three years, the IUE would gather information until September 30, 1996.
- Defying the Soviet government and the government's official trade unions for various laborers, a coal miner named Vladimir Klebanov announced that he and five other people were forming the "Trade Union for the Defense of Workers", and distributed the names of 200 other people (he said) who had agreed to join. Klebanov and the other four founders were arrested 10 days later on charges of remaining in Moscow without permission.
- Died: Leo Genn, 72, English actor and former prosecutor, Oscar nominee for Quo Vadis

== January 27, 1978 (Friday) ==
- The Supreme Court of the U.S. state of Illinois ruled that the National Socialist Party of America, an offshoot of the American Nazi Party had the right to march in a demonstration in the predominantly Jewish Chicago suburb of Skokie, and, based on the First Amendment right of freedom of speech, set aside a lower court order that had prevented the Nazis from marching. The American Civil Liberties Union (ACLU), which had defended the constitutional rights of other individuals and groups, had brought suit on behalf of the Nazis' right to free speech and the Illinois high court stated that it reluctantly permitted the Nazis to march, commenting that "The display of the swastika, as offensive to the principles of a nation as the memories it recalls may be, is symbolic political speech intended to convey to the public the beliefs of those who display it," and added that the First Amendment "was designed to prevent government from controlling by law the political beliefs a citizen might express."
- The sinking of the Spanish refrigerated ship Mabel killed 27 of the 36 people on board, after the freighter lost power to its engines during a heavy storm, then ran into rocks and broke apart.
- All 12 people aboard a SADELCA airlines flight in Colombia were killed when the Douglas DC-3 crashed into the Cerro Granada mountain at an altitude of 6,800 feet (2,100 m) while approaching San Vicente del Caguán following its departure from Neiva.
- Died: Oscar Homolka, 79, Austrian film and stage actor

== January 28, 1978 (Saturday) ==
- A fire killed 20 residents of the six-story tall Coates House hotel in Kansas City, Missouri, and seven of the other 140 residents were unaccounted for. Formerly a luxury hotel, the Oates House had become "a $17-a-week home for transients and the elderly." Four of the dead died when they jumped to their deaths.
- The first of 30 suspected victims of American serial killer John Brennan Crutchley was last seen alive. Crutchley would admit later that he had been visited by Deborah Rita Fitzjohn, a 25-year-old secretary in Fairfax, Virginia the night before her disappearance. Fitzjohn's skeletal remains would be found 21 months later. Crutchley would be arrested in 1985 on charges of kidnapping and rape after one of his victims survived, though he would never be charged with murder.
- Born:
  - Gianluigi Buffon, Italian footballer with 176 caps as goalkeeper for the Italy national team; in Carrara
  - Jamie Carragher, English footballer with 38 caps as a defender for the England national team; in Bootle, Merseyside
  - Papa Bouba Diop, Senegalese footballer with 63 caps as a defensive midfielder for the Senegal national team; in Rufisque (d. 2020 of ALS)
  - Vanessa Villela, Mexican telenovela actress; in Mexico City
  - Sheamus (ring name for Stephen Farrelly), Irish professional wrestler and the first Irish WWE world champion; in Dublin

== January 29, 1978 (Sunday) ==
- The Chadian–Libyan War began in North Africa as troops from Libya intervened in the ongoing Chadian Civil War and invaded northern Chad in support of Chad's rebels, the FROLINAT (Front de libération nationale du Tchad), led by Goukouni Oueddei. Libya's army quickly overran Chadian government positions at Faya-Largeau, Fada and Ounianga Kébir in northern Chad. France would intervene on February 20 after the collapse of Fava-Largeau.
- Died: Tim McCoy, 86, American B-movie actor who appeared in eight western films as U.S. Marshal Tim McCall, and briefly had his own TV show

== January 30, 1978 (Monday) ==
- Roberto Herrera Ibarguen, the former Foreign Minister of Guatemala, was released by his captors 30 days after he had been kidnapped and held hostage.
- The Larry King Show, the first nationally broadcast talk show for host Larry King, premiered on the Mutual Broadcasting System at 9:00 p.m. Pacific time (midnight Eastern time) in the U.S. and ran for five and one-half hours every night, initially on 28 stations. The show featured King's interview of a guest in the first hour, questions for the guest over the following two hours, and the "Open Phone America" for the last 150 minutes to allow callers to choose the subject. King would move to television on the CNN cable network in 1985 and continue until 2010.
- The historic Loew's Grand Theatre in Atlanta, the cinema where Gone with the Wind premiered on December 15, 1939, suffered the same fate as Atlanta itself in the film, being destroyed by fire.
- Born: Pyotr Dubrov, Russian software engineer and cosmonaut; in Khabarovsk, Russian SFSR, Soviet Union
- Died:
  - Damia (stage name for Marie-Louise Damien), 88, French singer and actress
  - Margaret Donahue, 85, American sports executive and innovative sales manager for the Chicago Cubs
  - David Millard, 46, South African first-class cricketer, shot himself to death.

== January 31, 1978 (Tuesday) ==
- Film director Roman Polanski, who had worked out a plea bargain to be found guilty of unlawful sexual intercourse with a minor (a 13-year-old girl) in return for probation and credit for six weeks in jail, left the United States one day before he was to be formally sentenced. Polanski had learned that Judge Laurence J. Rittenband was planning to change the sentence to 50 years in prison, and flew to London. Polanski boarded British Airways Flight 598 in Los Angeles and landed at Heathrow Airport the next day.
- Italy's Prime Minister Giulio Andreotti and his entire cabinet resigned after the withdrawal of support from the Italian Communist Party, which had supported Andreotti and the Christian Democrats, who were 54 seats short of a majority in Italy's Chamber of Deputies. Andreotti would receive approval for a new cabinet, with almost all of the same ministers, on March 16.
- Representatives of the Naskapi First Nation, indigenous Canadians living in far northern Quebec, signed the James Bay and Northern Quebec Agreement providing for financial compensation and establishment of a Naskapi-owned economic development corporation and a school.
- Died:
  - Gregory Herbert, 40, American jazz saxophonist, died of a heroin overdose.
  - Leo Seltzer, founder of the sport of Roller Derby
