= December 1977 =

Month in 1977

<<	December 1977					>>
Su	Mo	Tu	We	Th	Fr	Sa
				1	2	3
4	5	6	7	8	9	10
11	12	13	14	15	16	17
18	19	20	21	22	23	24
25	26	27	28	29	30	31

December 6, 1977: White-ruled South Africa cedes unconnected pieces of territory to create "Republic of Bophuthatswana"

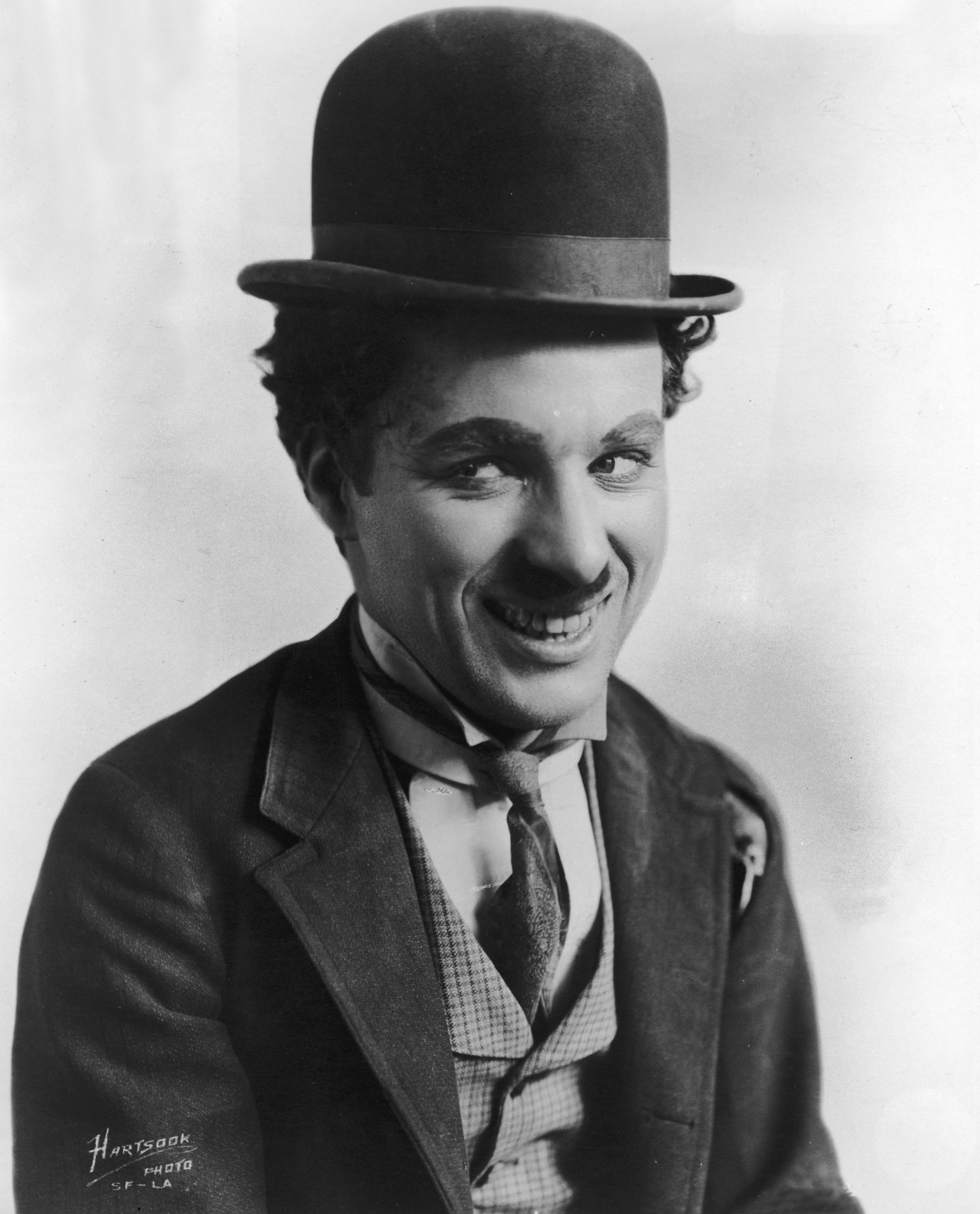
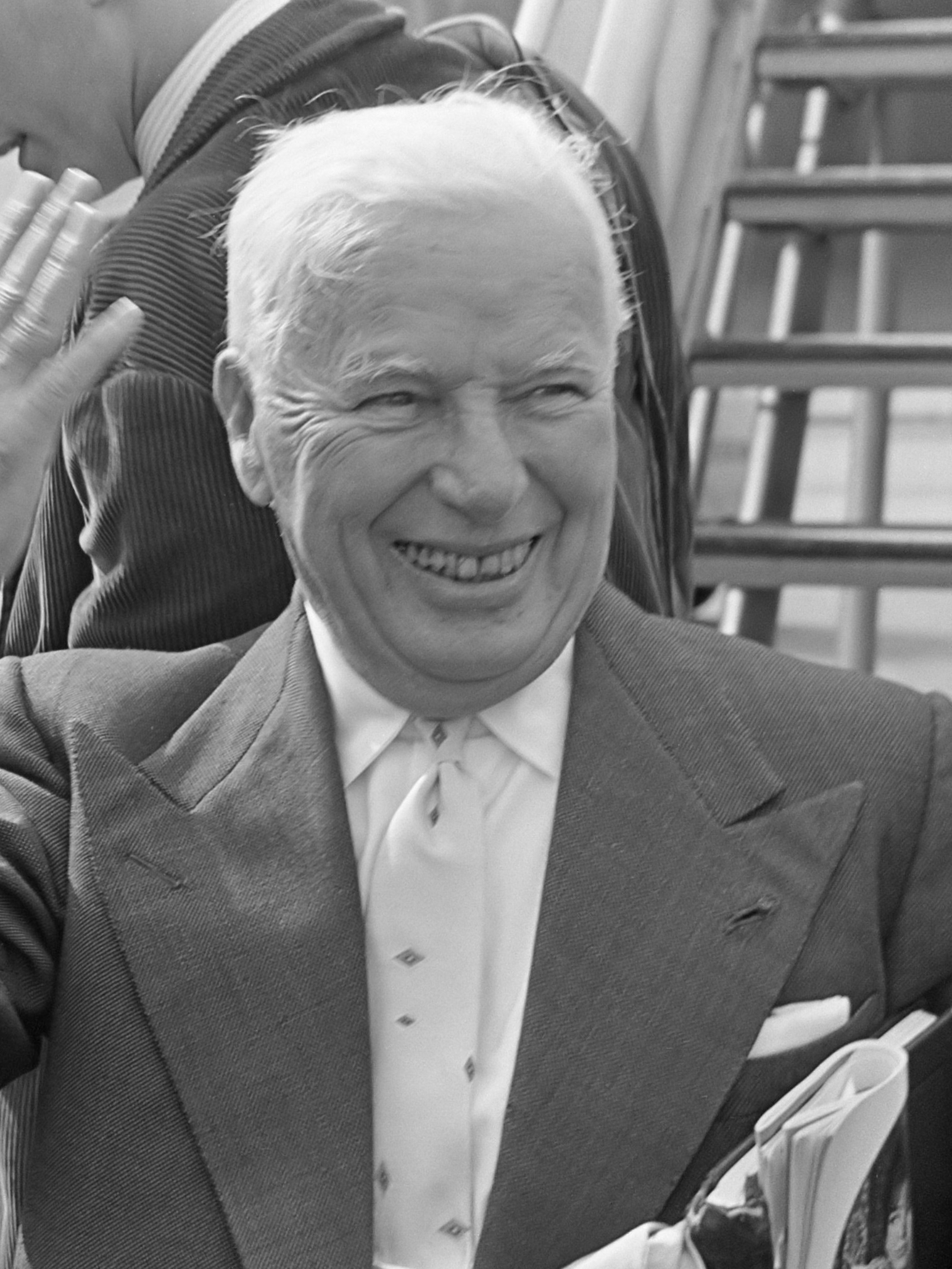
December 25, 1977: Film comedian Charlie Chaplin dies at age 88

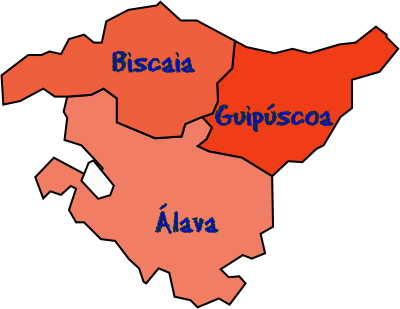
December 30, 1977: Spain offers autonomy to Basque Country in Álava, Biscay, and Gipuzkoa provinces

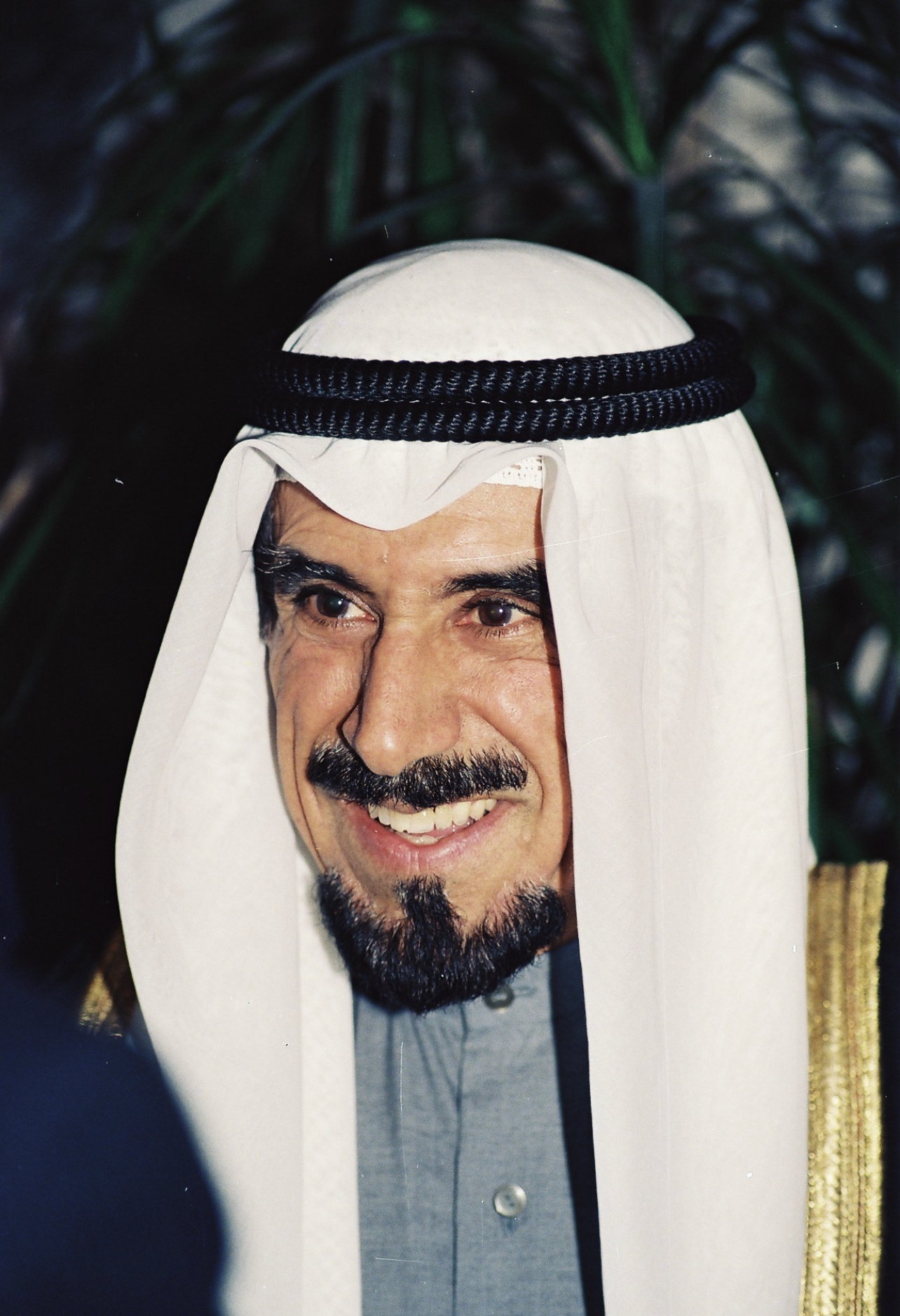
December 31, 1977: December 31, 1977: Sheikh Jabar Al-Sabah becomes the new Emir of Kuwait

The following events occurred in December 1977:

== December 1, 1977 (Thursday) ==
- In Columbus, Ohio, the first interactive cable television system, QUBE, was launched by Warner Communications. In addition to the standard box to receive cable signals, the system included a remote with five additional buttons to allow viewers to respond to multiple choice questions, including approval or disapproval of programming.
- The heads of state of multiple Arab nations gathered at Tripoli in Libya to discuss moves against Egypt and President Anwar Sadat for his recognition of the Jewish nation of Israel.
- Born: Brad Delson, American rock guitarist and co-founder of Linkin Park; in Agoura Hills, California

== December 2, 1977 (Friday) ==
- A jet crash killed 59 of the 159 people aboard a Libyan Arab Airlines flight that was bringing Muslim pilgrims back home from Saudi Arabia. The Tupolev Tu-154 ran out of fuel after having to alter its route to avoid Egyptian airspace, and the crew was attempting to find an alternate airport after its destination at Benghazi was hindered by a heavy fog.
- "World Series Cricket" (WSC), created by Australian TV network owner Kerry Packer after he was unable to secure rights to broadcast international network on his Nine Network, played its first match. Denied the right to use the trademark term "Test match" by the Marylebone Cricket Club, or to identify a national team as "Australia", Packer promoted the five-day international series as a "Supertest" and dubbed the team "WSC Australian XI". In that normal cricket venues in Australia were denied by Marylebone to rival competitors, WSC leased four alternate sites and hired John Maley to develop the "drop-in pitch". In the inaugural match, WSC Australian XI faced off against WSC West Indies XI at the Australian rules football stadium at Adelaide, in South Australia, playing before only 2,847 spectators. On the same day, a regular Test series began at Brisbane between Australia and India in front of 9,000 fans.
- Convicted murderers Erskine "Buck" Burrows and Larry Tacklyn were hanged at Casemates Prison in Bermuda, becoming the last people to be executed under British rule anywhere in the world. Burrows had been convicted of the 1973 assassination of Bermuda Governor Richard Sharples and four other murders, while Tacklyn was convicted of assisting Burrows on two murders. Rioting broke out the day before the execution of the two men, and at the request of Governor Peter Ramsbotham, the British Defence Ministry sent 150 troops to restore order.

== December 3, 1977 (Saturday) ==
- Seamus Twomey, a member of the Provisional Irish Republican Army's ruling army council, was recaptured in Ballsbridge more than four years after his escape by helicopter from Dublin's Mountjoy Prison. Police in Ireland had spotted the fugitive near Dublin and arrested him after a high-speed car chase.
- Fraye Arbeter Shtime, the oldest Yiddish language newspaper in the United States, published its final edition after 87 years of existence. The folding of the Stimme left only five Yiddish newspapers in the U.S., with the most popular one being the 80-year-old Jewish Daily Vorwarts.
- Died: Jack Beresford, 78, British rower gold medal winner in Olympic gold medals (1924, 1932 and 1936), and silver medals in 1920 and 1928

== December 4, 1977 (Sunday) ==
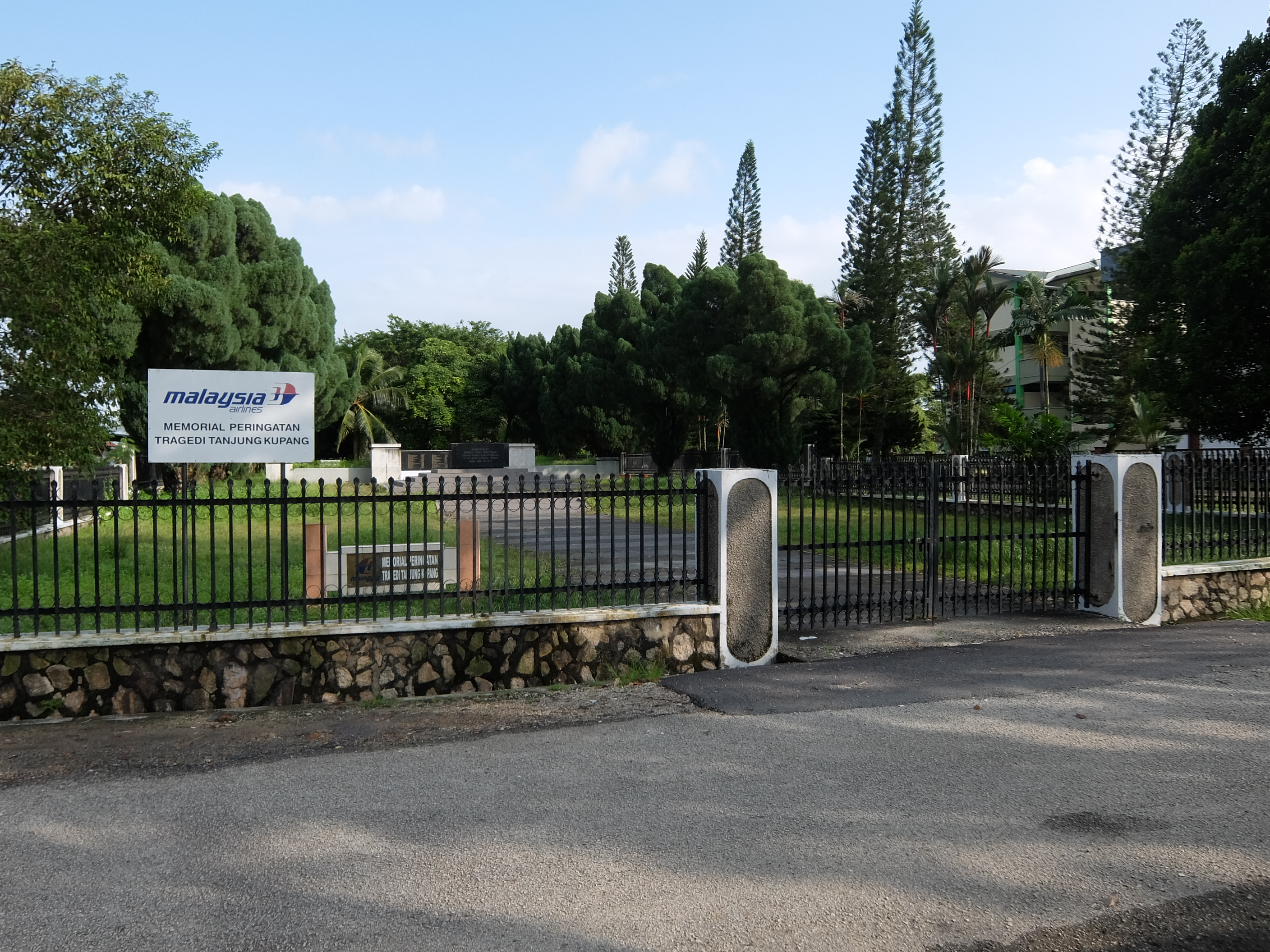
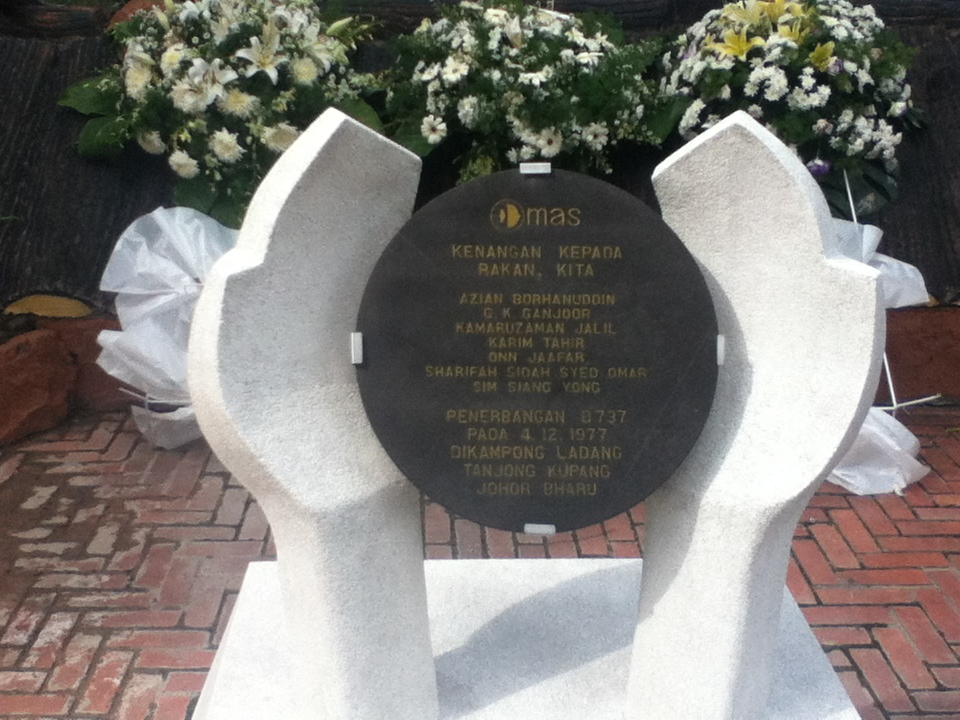
Memorial of the victims on Flight 653 at the Tanjung Kupang Memorial Park
- All 100 passengers and crew on board Malaysian Airline System Flight 653 were killed in a crash after the plane was hijacked. MAS 653 had departed Penang toward Kuala Lumpur at 7:54 p.m. local time. Ten minutes later, the crew reported that a terrorist from the Japanese Red Army had entered the cockpit and demanded to be flown to Singapore. The gunman then killed the pilot, the co-pilot and himself, and the autopilot was apparently disconnected, perhaps by another person attempting to fly the aircraft. The Boeing 737 crashed into a swamp near Tanjung Kupang on Johor.
- The coronation of Emperor Bokassa I took place in the Bangui, capital of the Central African Empire. According to reporters, the lavish ceremony at Bangui's indoor sports stadium was inspired by the 1804 coronation of Bokassa's idol, French emperor Napoleon Bonaparte. Bokassa, formerly President Jean-Bédel Bokassa, received "a 6-foot diamond-encrusted scepter of office and was then draped by aides in an ermine-trimmed red velvet cloak" that included a 24 feet (7.3 m) train. Emulating Napoleon, Bokassa placed a "diamond-encrusted imperial crown" upon his own head and then crowned his wife as the Empress Catherine, before sitting down on a specially designed "two-ton gold-plated throne, shaped like a 15-foot high eagle with an 18-foot wingspan", designed by French sculptor Olivier Brice, who also designed the crown, the scepter and a ceremonial sword. The event, held in a nation where the average per capita income was only $155, cost US$30,000,000.

== December 5, 1977 (Monday) ==
- The U.S. Hells Angels motorcycle club expanded into Canada for the first time, creating a Montreal chapter composed of 35 members of the Popeyes, Canada's second largest motor gang. The Hells Angels entry into Canada came five months after the Outlaws Motorcycle Club of the U.S. had formed its first Canadian chapter on July 1 from members of the Satan's Choice club, and the Hells Angels and Outlaws would soon fight for domination of Montreal and Quebec.
- Born: Matt Gutman, American TV journalist and author; in Princeton, New Jersey
- Died:
  - David K. E. Bruce, 79, U.S. diplomat who had served as the U.S. ambassador to France (1949-1952), West Germany (1957-1959) and the United Kingdom (1961-1969) as well as being the first U.S. Liaison to the People's Republic of China (1973-1974) after diplomatic relations were established
  - Marshal Aleksandr Vasilevsky, 82, Chief of the General Staff of the Soviet Armed Forces during World War II
  - Katherine Milhous, 83, American author and illustrator

== December 6, 1977 (Tuesday) ==
Flag of Bophuthatswana

- South Africa granted nominal independence to Bophuthatswana, its newest Bantustan, although the nation was not recognized by any other country. In the capital at Mafeking, Lucas Mangope was inaugurated as the first and only president of Bophuthatswana, serving until the area's reincorporation into a black-ruled South Africa in 1994.
- Members of the United Mine Workers of America (UMWA) walked off away from coal mining jobs at 12:01 a.m. as winter weather began in the United States, beginning a 110-day strike that halted the production of coal. The strike would last for more than three months, ending on March 19 after a new wage agreement would be entered with the larger coal companies within the Bituminous Coal Operators Association.
- Born: Andrew Flintoff, English cricketer for the England national team with 591 Test matches and 154 ODIs; in Preston, Lancashire

== December 7, 1977 (Wednesday) ==
- Sweden's parliament, the Riksdag, voted 231 to 57 to outlaw slot machines, beginning in 1979.
- Born: Luke Donald, English professional golfer who was the top money winner in the PGA and European tours in 2011, ranked number one in the world for 10 months 2011 to 2012; in Hemel Hempstead, Hertfordshire
- Died: David Holden, 53, British journalist and chief foreign correspondent for The Sunday Times, was murdered while on assignment in Egypt.

== December 8, 1977 (Thursday) ==
- In Paris, the Réseau Express Régional (RER), described by Reuters at the time as "the world's most advanced urban transport system", was inaugurated by France's president Valéry Giscard d'Estaing, who took the controls of the electric high-speed underground train and drove it at speeds up to 100 kilometres per hour (62 mph) on its 10 kilometer trip from the new Châtelet–Les Halles station beneath Paris to the Boissy-Saint-Léger station. The system opened to the public the next day, with free rides for its first three days.
- Portugal's Socialist Prime Minister Mario Soares and his government lost a vote of confidence in the National Assembly by a margin of 159 against and 100 in favor. Deputies of the Communist Party, Social Democrats and Center Democrats joined in their opposition to Soares.
- Off the coast of the U.S. state of Louisiana, 17 people were killed in the crash of a helicopter, carrying employees of the Pennzoil Producing Company to an offshore oil drilling rig. Only two people survived the accident as the Puma helicopter dropped from a height of 130 feet (40 m) while attempting to land at the rig in high winds. The men were preparing to start a seven-day shift at the Pennzoil rig, located in the Gulf of Mexico 90 miles (140 km) south of Morgan City, Louisiana.
- Born:
  - Sébastien Chabal, French rugby union player with 62 caps for the France national team; in Valence, Drôme département
  - Matthias Schoenaerts, Belgian film and TV actor, 2014 winner of the César Award for Most Promising Actor; in Antwerp
  - Elsa Benítez, Mexican model and TV host; in Hermosillo, Sonora state
  - Ryan Newman, (nicknamed "The Rocket-Man") American race car driver

== December 9, 1977 (Friday) ==
- In one of the most violent games in the National Basketball Association (NBA) in the U.S., Rudy Tomjanovich of the Houston Rockets was seriously injured by a single punch by Kermit Washington of the Los Angeles Lakers. Tomjanovich was struck so hard that besides fracturing his skull and having a broken jaw and bone, he leaked blood and spinal fluid while unconscious on the basketball court, and he was placed in the intensive care unit of the Centinela Hospital in Houston. Washington was fined $10,000 and suspended from NBA play by Commissioner Larry O'Brien for at least 60 days (keeping him out for 26 games). The incident would be the basis of a book by sportswriter John Feinstein, The Punch: One Night, Two Lives, and the Fight That Changed Basketball Forever.
- The U.S. and Mexico made their first exchange of prisoners. At 9:07 in the morning, a chartered Texas International Airways DC-9 departed from San Diego, California with 36 Mexicans (11 from Texas state prisons and 25 from federal prisons). After landing in Mexico City, the DC-9 took aboard 61 Americans (35 men and 26 women) who had been in Mexican jails, along with an 18-month-old girl whose mother had given birth while incarcerated, and the aircraft landed in San Diego at 5:15 in the afternoon. Once in the U.S., the 61 Americans were transferred to other prisons. Most of the 235 American prisoners who qualified for a return to the U.S. had been convicted of drug trafficking or possession, but seven had been convicted of murder.
- Died:
  - Nazir Ghory, 76, Indian film comedian who, with Manohar Dixit, had been part of the team of Ghory and Dixit, described as "the Indian Laurel and Hardy"
  - Barbara Mitchell, 48, English TV actress known for Beryl's Lot and For the Love of Ada, died of breast cancer.

== December 10, 1977 (Saturday) ==
- Voting was held for Australia's House of Representatives. The Liberal/National Country Coalition, led by Prime Minister Malcolm Fraser lost seats but kept a slightly reduced majority, defeating the Australian Labor Party (ALP) and its leader, former prime minister Gough Whitlam. Consequently, Whitlam resigned as ALP leader after holding the job for nearly 11 years, and would be replaced by former treasurer Bill Hayden.
- The first college entrance exams since 1966, in the People's Republic of China, were held for 1.5 million applicants across the Communist nation. Entrance exams had been banned during the Cultural Revolution as part of a campaign against intellectuals.
- Born: Andrea Henkel, German biathlete and Olympic gold medalist; in Ilmenau, East Germany
- Died: Adolph Rupp, 76, American college basketball coach for the University of Kentucky who guided his teams to four NCAA titles, later inducted into the Naismith Memorial Basketball Hall of Fame

== December 11, 1977 (Sunday) ==
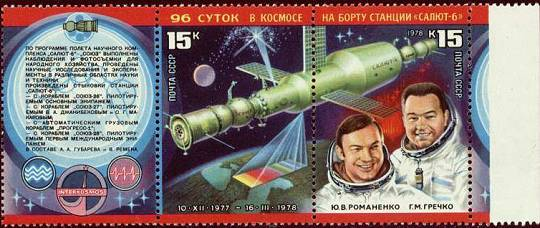
Soviet 20-kopeck stamp of Soyuz 26

- Soyuz 26, with cosmonauts Yuri Romanenko and Georgy Grechko, was launched into orbit by the Soviet Union and docked with the Salyut 6 space station at 6:02 Moscow time.
- The NFL's Tampa Bay Buccaneers, who had lost all 14 games of their first season and lost the first 12 of the 1977 season, finally had a victory, defeating the New Orleans Saints, 33 to 14.
- Born: James Chau, English-born Chinese journalist and former anchor of the English-language China Central Television News in the People's Republic of China; in London
- Died: Saida Menebhi, Moroccan poet and political prisoner, died on the 35th day of her hunger strike in Casablanca.

== December 12, 1977 (Monday) ==
- The African nation of Kenya banned the sale of skins and trophies of all endangered wildlife, following up on a May 1977 ban on all hunting.
- A civilian airliner from Israel was allowed for the first time to land in an Arab nation, as an Airline Arkia BAC-111 jet brought 64 journalists to Cairo on a flight from Tel Aviv to cover the December 14 opening of the Cairo peace talks.
- Born: Adam Saitiev, Russian Chechen freestyle wrestler, 1999 and 2002 world champion at 76 and 84 kg respectively, 2000 Olympic gold medalist at 85 kg; in Khasavyurt, Russian SFSR, Soviet Union
- Died:
  - Clementine Churchill, 92, life peer in the British House of Lords and widow of Sir Winston Churchill
  - Frank Boucher, 76, Canadian ice hockey player and NHL star, inducted into the Hockey Hall of Fame

== December 13, 1977 (Tuesday) ==
- All 29 people aboard Air Indiana Flight 216, including the 14 players and 10 other people associated with the University of Evansville basketball team, were killed when the Douglas DC-3 crashed shortly after takeoff from Evansville on a flight to Nashville. The team was scheduled to play Middle Tennessee State University in Murfreesboro, Tennessee. Another player who had missed the flight because he was out for the season with an ankle injury would be killed 14 days later in an auto accident. The National Transportation Safety Board ultimately concluded that the flight crew had forgotten to remove control locks from the rudder and right aileron on the DC-3 airplane, preventing any control.
- A fire in a dormitory at Providence College at Providence, Rhode Island in the U.S. killed 10 female students. After a six-month investigation, the fire was blamed by investigators on a pair of two portable hair dryers that had been left running inside a closet in a dormitory room.

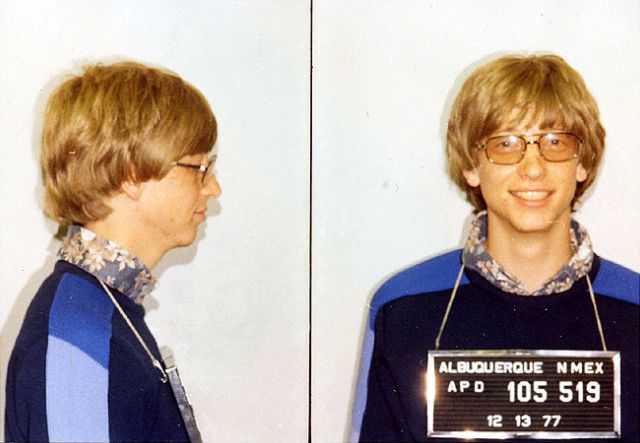
Mugshot of Bill Gates after his arrest

- Microsoft founder and CEO Bill Gates was arrested by the Albuquerque Police Department for reckless driving by going beyond the speed limit and for driving without a Driver's license in Albuquerque, New Mexico.
- Born: Peter Stringer, Irish rugby union player with 98 caps for the Ireland national team; in Cork

== December 14, 1977 (Wednesday) ==
- The 591 residents of the town of Lark, Utah were given notice by Kennecott Copper Company that they would be evicted from their homes. The meeting of company officials and townspeople took place at the chapel of the town's Church of Jesus Christ of Latter-day Saints". Lark had been a company town for the U.S. Smelting and Refining Company, until U.S. Smelting sold the property to Kennecott. Most of the residents were relocated to the nearby town of Copperton. Lark became a ghost town as well as the dumping ground for Kennecott to store large quantities of overburden from nearby Bingham Canyon Mine.
- Born:
  - Prem Rakshith, Indian film choreographer and four-time Filmfare Award winner; in Pondicherry, Puducherry union territory
  - Fally Ipupa (stage name for Fally Ipupa N'simba), popular Congolese singer; in Kinshasa, Zaire
  - Azy, American hybrid orangutan who has been on exhibit at four different zoos in the first 45 years of his life; in Washington, D.C. in the U.S. at the National Zoo

== December 15, 1977 (Thursday) ==
- Kim Il Sung was unanimously re-elected President of North Korea by the Supreme People's Assembly of the Asian nation. Kim, leader of the nation's Communist Party since 1945, and chaired the provisional government in 1945 and had been the first, and only, president since the 1948 proclamation of the Democratic People's Republic of Korea.
- Less than six months after becoming an independent nation, the northeast African nation of Djibouti began its transition to a dictatorship, with 17 opponents of President Hassan Gouled Aptidon being arrested for being members of the Mouvement populaire de libération, and charged with killing five people in a grenade attack on a restaurant.

== December 16, 1977 (Friday) ==
- Saturday Night Fever was released in theaters and would become the biggest most successful dance movie of all time. Made on a budget of $3.5 million, it would earn more than 65 times that much, with box office receipts of $237.1 million. The movie launched the film career of its star, John Travolta, and catapulted the Bee Gees — who performed several songs on the soundtrack — to newfound success.
- The unincorporated U.S. town of Vulcan, West Virginia, received a pledge from the West Virginia State Highway Commission that a bridge would be replaced, but only after a journalist from the Soviet Union had arrived in the town to meet with a community leader who had written a request for help to the Soviet Embassy.
- A serious disaster was averted in the collision of two supertankers in the Indian Ocean, roughly 20 miles (32 km) from the coast of South Africa and resorts at Port Elizabeth, when the empty tanker MV Venpet struck its fully loaded sister ship, MV Venoil. Although two of the 84-member crew of the Venoil were killed, the Venpet missed hitting the oil storage tanks directly, averting an explosion that would have killed most of the people on both ships.
- Born: René Redzepi, Danish chef and restaurateur, owner of the Copenhagen's award-winning Noma restaurant; in Copenhagen
- Died:
  - Gustaf Aulén, 98, Swedish Lutheran theologian, author of Christus Victor
  - Yngve Larsson, 93, Swedish urban planner and politician

== December 17, 1977 (Saturday) ==
- Two days of voting were completed in a referendum in the Philippines on whether president and prime minister Ferdinand E. Marcos should continue in office after the organization in 1978 of a new national legislature, the Interim Batasang Pambansa. Official returns showed Marcos winning more than 89% of the vote.
- A the age of 80, Miskel Spillman became the oldest person to host the U.S. comedy variety show Saturday Night Live, being two months older than actress Ruth Gordon, who had been 80 when she hosted on January 22. Mrs. Spillman, who won the program's one-time "Anybody Can Host" contest, had been selected after writing "I am 80 years old and I want one more cheap thrill as my doctor just told me I only have 25 years to live." Mrs. Spillman, who lived 14 more years after being the only non-celebrity to host the show, would hold the record until 2010, when 88-year-old comedian Betty White was the host.
- Born: Oxana Fedorova, Russian model, 2002 Miss Universe winner who was the first ever to be dethroned, later a television host; in Pskov, Russian SFSR, Soviet Union

== December 18, 1977 (Sunday) ==
- SA de Transport Aérien Flight 730, an international charter service from Zürich in Switzerland to Madeira in Portugal, crashed into the Atlantic Ocean during a landing attempt. Many of the 36 dead survived the crash but drowned while trapped inside the sinking aircraft. Another 21 survived with the help of rescuers and by swimming to the shore.
- Died:
  - Cyril Ritchard, 79, British stage, film and TV actor known best for portraying Captain Hook in the Broadway production of Peter Pan
  - Louis Untermeyer, 92, American anthologist, poet and editor
  - Marriner Eccles, 87, U.S. businessman and economist, former chairman of the Federal Reserve Board as well as for forming (in 1928) the first multibank holding company in the U.S., First Security Bank

== December 19, 1977 (Monday) ==
- The government of Indonesia released more than 10,000 political prisoners, many of whom had been held for 12 years without trial on suspicion of being part of the 30 September Movement that had attempted to overthrow the government in 1965.
- Dries van Agt was sworn in as the new prime minister of the Netherlands, succeeding Joop den Uyl, who had resigned eight months earlier on March 22. Van Agt had previously served as the minister of justice and the vice premier. The new government was formed from a coalition of the Christian Democrats and the Liberal Party, which combined for 77 of the 150 seats in the Second Chamber, a majority of only two.
- Died:
  - Nellie Tayloe Ross, 101, the first woman governor of a U.S. state, Governor of Wyoming 1925 to 1927
  - Vice Admiral Takeo Kurita, 88, Japanese Navy officer and commander of the Imperial Navy 2nd Fleet in the Battle of Leyte Gulf

== December 20, 1977 (Tuesday) ==
- A 5.9 magnitude earthquake struck Iran at 4:34 in the morning Iran Standard Time (23:34 on 19 December UTC) and killed 584 people while injuring more than 1,000 others.
- In Argentina, the bodies of five women washed ashore on the coastline of Santa Teresita in the Province of Buenos Aires. Almost 30 years later, the bodies would be identified as those of five people suspected of having become "desaparecidos", last seen on December 10 after the Mothers of the Plaza de Mayo group had published an advertisement listening the names of their adult children who had been kidnapped and never seen again. Based on the condition of the bodies, which had indicated "impact on hard objects from a great height", investigators would conclude that the victims had their corpses dropped into the sea as part of a "death flight" ("vuelo de la muerte"). DNA evidence showed that the five dead were all organizers of the Mothers of the Plaza de Mayo, Azucena Villaflor, Esther Ballestrino, María Ponce de Bianco, Ángela Auad, and Léonie Duquet.
- After decades of the denial of United Nations membership to both North Vietnam and South Vietnam, the Socialist Republic of Vietnam — the union of both countries following South Vietnam's conquest by the north in 1975— was admitted to the UN. The newly independent Republic of Djibouti was admitted on the same day.
- Jesse Walter Bishop of Nevada, who in 1979 would become the first person to be executed in the gas chamber since the reinstatement of the death penalty in the U.S. (and the second American legally executed overall) committed the killing that would lead to his death sentence. Bishop had walked into a casino in Las Vegas and shot David Ballard, a customer at the El Morocco Casino who had gotten married earlier in the day. Thompson died of his injuries 10 days later.

== December 21, 1977 (Wednesday) ==
- The final stage of the U.S. superhighway Interstate 75 was opened, almost 20 years after construction had started for what would become the primary travel route from Canada (starting at the border crossing at Sault Ste. Marie, Michigan to the Gulf of Mexico at Tampa, Florida. The two 1,464 miles (2,356 km) stretches of highway were joined when the barricades were lifted on the last 17 miles (27 km) segment between Cartersville, Georgia and Marietta.
- Born:
  - Emmanuel Macron, President of France since 2017; in Amiens, Somme département
  - Iyabo Ojo, Nigerian film actress and producer known for Divorce Not Allowed'; in Lagos
- Died:
  - Herbert Seddon, 74, British orthopedic surgeon; in Derby, Derbyshire
  - Sean Keating, 88, Irish painter

== December 22, 1977 (Thursday) ==
- In the U.S., a grain elevator exploded in Westwego, Louisiana, killing 36 people. The blast happened at 9:10 in the morning local time when a Norwegian ship, MV Vesteroy, was being loaded with grain from one of the silos at Continental Grain Company. A chain reaction from the first events set off similar explosions in 45 storage units.
- In the U.S., an artist from Hawaii tried to kill himself by leaping from the 86th floor of the Empire State Building in New York City. After he jumped, a 30 miles per hour (48 km/h) wind blew him back against the building and he landed on a 3 feet (0.91 m) wide ledge on the 85th floor. According to an Associated Press report, "Helms lay stunned on the ledge about half an hour before he could open a window to the NBC television transmitter room on the 85th floor and crawl inside about 7:15 p.m., police said."
- Died: Karl John, 72, German film actor

== December 23, 1977 (Friday) ==
- Warships of the Soviet Union intervened for the first time in the Eritrean War of Independence on behalf of the Marxist nation of Ethiopia, which had been losing to the Eritrean People's Liberation Front (EPLF). The Soviet ships struck the coastal city of Massawa, firing artillery shells at EPLF strongholds. The EPLF retreated in a "strategic withdrawal" to the Sahel desert.
- English rock musician Cat Stevens (born Steven Georgiou) converted to Islam. He would later change his name to Yusuf Islam.
- Born:
  - Matt Baker, British TV presenter who hosted the children's show Blue Peter from 1999 to 2006, BBC One's Countryfile since 2009 and the BBC newsmagazine The One Show from 2011 to 2020; in Easington, County Durham
  - Nikolay Alexeyev, Russian lawyer and LGBT rights activist; in Moscow

== December 24, 1977 (Saturday) ==
- Colombian serial killer Daniel Camargo Barbosa was incarcerated at the "inescapable" prison on Gorgona Island, 17 miles (27 km) off of the coast of Colombia, after having killed more than 80 young girls. He would remain on the island for almost seven years before escaping in November 1984, and would be presumed dead until less than a month later, when he would travel to Ecuador and resume killing at least 72 more girls over 14 months before being arrested again. He would be stabbed to death by the nephew of one of his victims on November 15, 1994.
- Died:
  - General Juan Velasco Alvarado, 67, President of Peru 1968 to 1975
  - Nalini Bala Devi, 79, Indian poet and writer
  - Peruchín (Pedro Nolasco Jústiz Rodríguez), Cuban pianist

== December 25, 1977 (Sunday) ==
- Menachem Begin became the first prime minister of Israel to visit an Arab republic as he and a delegation that included Defense Minister Moshe Dayan landed at the Abu Sweir air base and then flew to Ismailia as the guest of Egypt's president Anwar Sadat. From the airport, the Israeli delegation was chauffeured "in what must rank as one of the world's briefest motorcades", traveling in six limousines 100 yards (91 m) to Sadat's home. On the flight from Tel Aviv, Begin told reporters, "Moses made the same trip.. only faster and in the opposite direction."
- Born: Uhm Ji-won, South Korean film and TV actress; in Daegu
- Died: Charlie Chaplin, 88, English comedian, silent film actor, and filmmaker, died at his mansion in Switzerland, Le Manoir de Ban, near Lake Geneva and the village of Vevey.

== December 26, 1977 (Monday) ==
- The Gitanjali Express, described as the first "classless train" in India because it provided drinking water, comfortable seating and other services to all passengers regardless of their social class or income, began operations with its inaugural run from Bombay to Calcutta. The Indian Railway Board had approved the experiment, proposed by Railway Minister Madhu Dandvate, for the 30-hour trip. Dandvate named the train for the book Gitanjali, by Rabindranath Tagore.
- Vietnam launched a large-scale invasion of Democratic Kampuchea, the neighboring country that had formerly been Cambodia until its takeover by the Khmer Rouge. Kampuchea expelled the Vietnamese ambassador and embassy staff on December 31, and the Vietnamese-Kampuchean war soon deteriorated into a larger war with the People's Republic of China in 1978.
- Died:
  - Howard Hawks, 81, American film director known for directing Sergeant York and Bringing Up Baby
  - Alberto Gainza Paz, 78, Argentine newspaper publisher and owner of the Buenos Aires daily La Prensa

== December 27, 1977 (Tuesday) ==
- Star Wars made its debut in the United Kingdom, seven months after its world premiere in the United States.
- A grain elevator explosion in the U.S. in less than a week killed 18 people at the Farmer's Export Company in Galveston, Texas. The disaster happened five days after a similar accident killed 34 people in Westwego, Louisiana

== December 28, 1977 (Wednesday) ==
- G. William Miller, chairman of the board of Textron, Inc., was selected by U.S. president Carter to succeed Arthur F. Burns as the new chairman of the Federal Reserve Board, effective January 31.
- Died: Charlotte Greenwood, 87, American stage and film actress

== December 29, 1977 (Thursday) ==
- All 24 people aboard a SAN Ecuador airliner were killed when the Vickers 764D Viscount crashed into a hillside while en route from Guayaquil to Cuenca.
- U.S. president Carter arrived in the Communist nation of Poland, coming to Warsaw as the first stop in a 9-day tour of six nations. He was greeted by the de facto leader, Polish Workers Party chairman Edward Gierek. The translator for the U.S. Department of State offended Carter's hosts when he rendered Carter's remark about a "desire for peace" by using the word for a sexual desire for the Polish people. Another statement by Carter, about his departure on the trip from the U.S., used a word referring to abandonment. Carter's press secretary, Jody Powell, told reporters that the translator had been "relieved of his duties" and added, "There will be a new translator tomorrow," while a State Department official made an official apology to the Polish government.
- Pakistan's president Zia ul-Haq announced the release of 11,109 political prisoners who had been detained by Prime Minister Zulfiqar Ali Bhutto, who had been overthrown in July.

== December 30, 1977 (Friday) ==
- The government of Spain, led by Prime Minister Adolfo Suarez, announced that the kingdom's three predominantly Basque provinces— Álava, Biscay, and Gipuzkoa— would be granted self-government. The Basque Autonomous Community (Euskal Autonomia Erkidegoa or Comunidad Autónoma Vasca) would be formally established in 1979.
- Serial killer Ted Bundy escapes from the Pitkin County Jail in Aspen, Colorado by sawing a hole in the ceiling of his cell, prompting a nationwide manhunt. Law enforcement agencies intensified their search efforts and ultimately led to his capture in February 1978, but not before he had committed several more heinous crimes.
- Born:
  - Laila Ali, U.S. professional boxer, daughter of Muhammad Ali and holder of the WBC and WBA women's super middleweight titles; in Miami Beach, Florida
  - Kenyon Martin, U.S. basketball player

== December 31, 1977 (Saturday) ==
- Prime Minister Jaber Al-Ahmad Al-Sabah became the new emir of Kuwait upon the death of his father, Sabah Al-Salim Al-Sabah, who had ruled the nation since 1965.
- Prime Minister Süleyman Demirel of Turkey lost a vote of confidence by 10 votes, when members of his Justice Party joined with the rival Republican People's Party voted no confidence in the Demirel government, 228 to 218. President Fahri Korutürk named Demirel's predecessor, Bülent Ecevit as the new premier.
- Canada's prime minister Pierre Trudeau told an interviewer for the CTV Television Network that he would invoke the War Measures Act if the province of Quebec attempted to secede."There cannot be any unilateral declaration of independence," Trudeau (a native of Quebec) told a reporter on December 20, adding "I'm not going to be shy about using the sword if something illegal is attempted in the province of Quebec."
- U.S. president Carter and First Lady Rosalynn Carter celebrated New Year's Eve outside of the United States, as guests of the Mohammad Reza Pahlavi, Shah of Iran and the Empress Farah Diba, in the last visit by a U.S. president to Iran, and the first time an American president ended the year in another nation. The Carters were treated to a "sumptuous state dinner" in the "splendid Niavaran Palace" in Tehran.
- Born:
  - Psy (stage name for Park Jae-sang), South Korean singer, songwriter and comedian; in Seoul
  - Donald Trump Jr., American political activist and businessman, son of Ivana Trump and U.S. president Donald Trump; in New York City
