= November 1977 =

Month of 1977

<<	November 1977					>>
Su	Mo	Tu	We	Th	Fr	Sa
		1	2	3	4	5
6	7	8	9	10	11	12
13	14	15	16	17	18	19
20	21	22	23	24	25	26
27	28	29	30

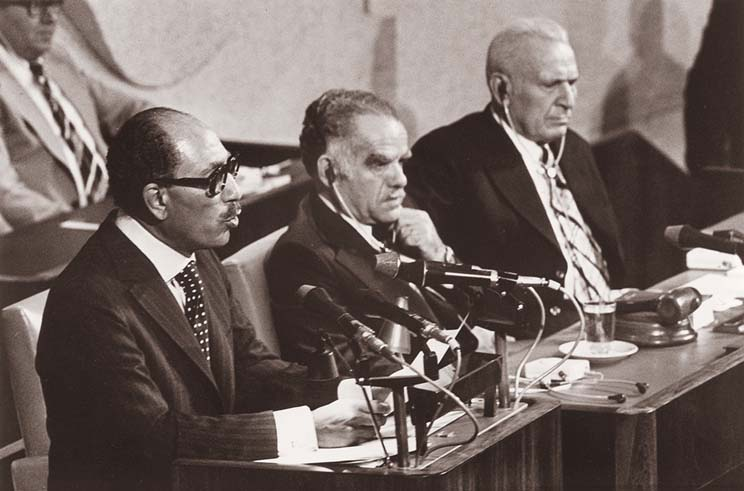
November 19, 1977: Egyptian president Anwar Sadat becomes the first Arab leader to visit Israel, addresses the Knesset at Tel Aviv

November 22, 1977: The TCP/IP successfully links 3 of the 111 existing ARPANET nodes, provides basis for the eventual creation of the Internet

The following events occurred in November 1977:

== November 1, 1977 (Tuesday) ==
- The Soviet Union began supersonic passenger service with the first flight of the new Tu-144, a close copy of the Concorde airliner of the UK and France. Designer Alexei Tupolev was one of the passengers, along with other Soviet officials and celebrities, and a delegation of foreign reporters, as Captain Boris Kuznetsov flew the aircraft 1,992 miles (3,206 km) from Moscow to Alma-Ata.
- In the Spanish city of Covadonga, 9-year-old Prince Felipe of Borbon and Greece, son of King Juan Carlos I and Queen Sophia, was ceremoniously given the title of Prince of Asturias, a recognition of his being heir to the throne of Spain. He would become King Felipe VI in 2014 upon the abdication of his father.
- 2060 Chiron, the first of the outer Solar System asteroids known as Centaurs, was discovered by Charlie Kowal of the Palomar Mountain Observatory in the U.S., near San Diego, California. The large object, estimated to be as much as 400 miles (640 km) in diameter, was discovered from an analysis of photographs taken on October 18 and 19 from Palomar.
- U.S. president Jimmy Carter signed the largest increase up to that time in the federal minimum wage, at the time $2.30 an hour, to go up on the first of each of the next four years. The wage would rise to $2.65 to start 1978, $2.90 in 1979, $3.10 in 1980 and $3.35 in 1981.
- The United States withdrew its membership in the International Labour Organization (ILO), marking the first time that the U.S. had withdrawn from a United Nations agency since the founding of the UN in 1945.

== November 2, 1977 (Wednesday) ==
- In the Netherlands, kidnappers released Dutch real estate tycoon Maurits Caransa five days after his kidnapping, upon payment of 10 million Dutch guilders, equivalent to four million U.S. dollars.
- The worst storms in modern Greek history caused the Kifissos and Ilios rivers to rise, flooding Athens and Piraeus and killing at least 25 people.
- Soviet leader Leonid Brezhnev said in a speech that the Soviet Union was ready to agree to a moratorium on nuclear testing and to pursue a comprehensive nuclear test-ban treaty, similar to the partial test-ban of 1963.
- A rocket struck and damaged a hotel in Rhodesia (now Zimbabwe) after being fired by guerrillas from neighboring Zambia. The target had been an airplane carrying sightseers over Victoria Falls, and instead it set fire to the Elephant Hills Country Club.

== November 3, 1977 (Thursday) ==
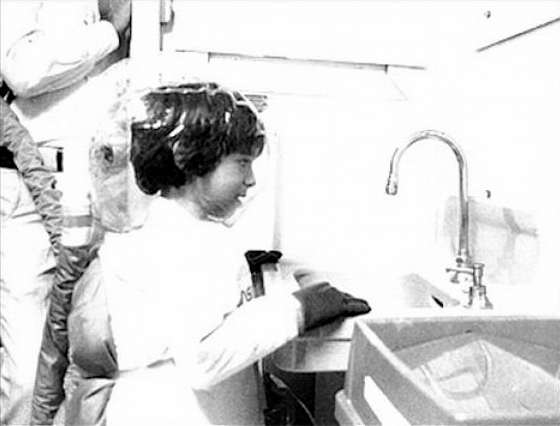
David in the "spacesuit"

- David Vetter, a 6-year-old boy born with severe combined immunodeficiency and confined to a sterile plastic "bubble" room at the Texas Children's Hospital in Dallas, was able to walk out of his room for the first time, thanks to a specially designed airtight suit and oxygen supply.

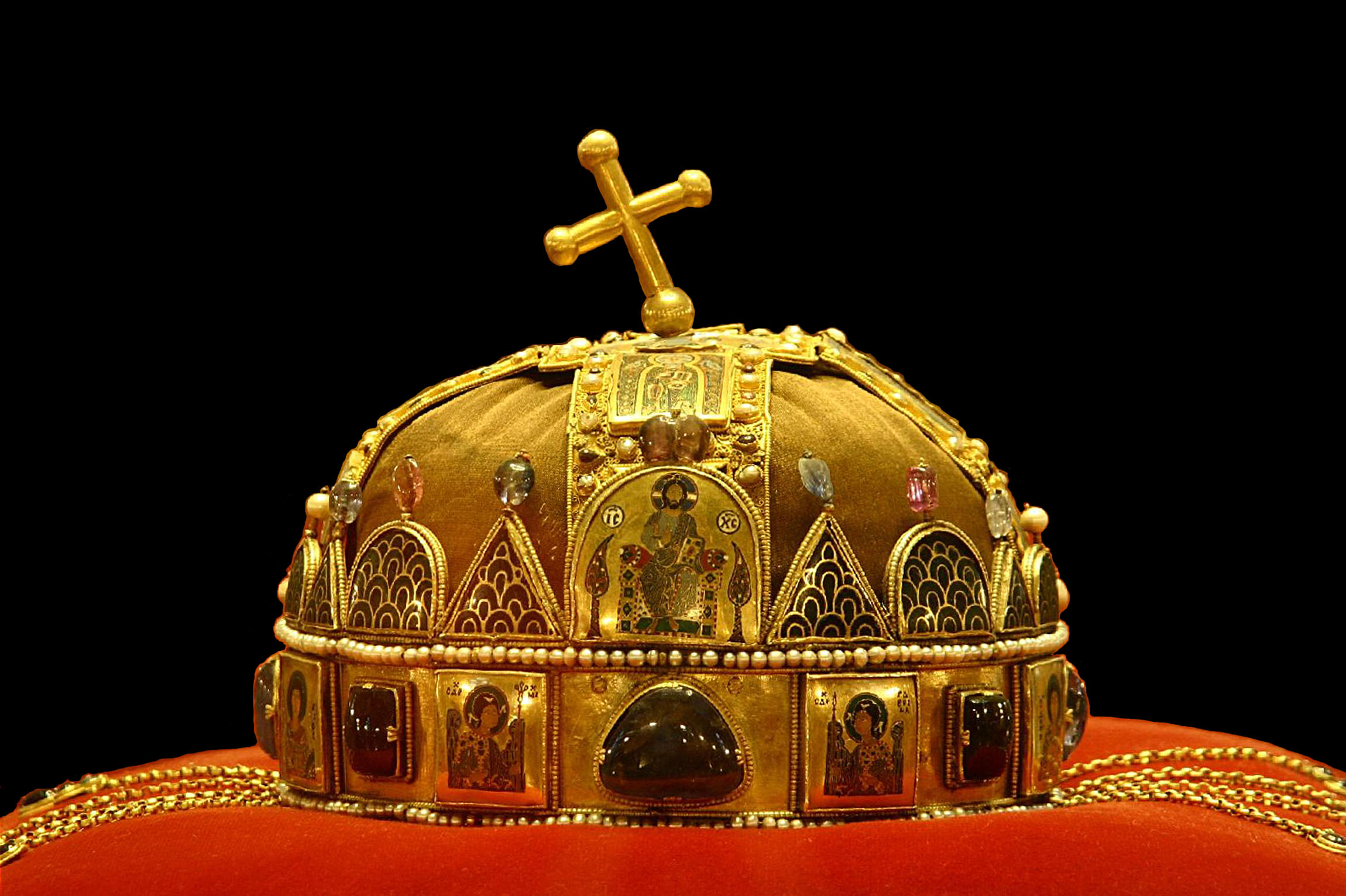
St. Stephen's Crown

- The U.S. State Department announced that it would return the Crown of St. Stephen to Hungary, provided that the Hungarian government would give assurances that the crown would be available on public display for all Hungarian citizens to see. The crown had come under U.S. possession near the end of World War II and had been kept at Fort Knox since 1953.
- Three Ecauadorian oil prospectors, employed by the French Geophysical General Company, were killed in the western jungles of Ecuador by the independent Huaorani people, also referred to as the "Auca Indians", after disregarding a Huaorani warning— two crossed spears— warning strangers to proceed no further into the jungle. Two other prospectors in the group were able to escape, and one of them was able to reach a military outpost. An Ecuadorian Army patrol located the three dead prospectors, who had "twenty poison-tipped spears" embedded in their bodies.
- René Lévesque, the Premier of Quebec and an advocate of independence for the predominantly French-speaking the Canadian province, became the first Canadian to be presented the Legion of Honor medal, the highest civilian award bestowed by France. Lévesque was presented the medal by French president Valéry Giscard d'Estaing at the presidential residence at the Élysée Palace in Paris, for "exceptional service in the cause of France or French relations". The Canadian government registered a complaint to the French government by way of its embassy in Paris, pointing out that Canadian law required approval by Canada's government for the granting of foreign titles or awards to Canadian citizens.
- Died: Florence Vidor, 82, American silent film actress

== November 4, 1977 (Friday) ==
- The United Nations Security Council voted unanimously to impose an embargo against the sale of weapons to South Africa, marking the first time in United Nations history that mandatory sanctions had been applied to a UN member.
- An Indian Air Force jet, carrying India's prime minister Morarji Desai, crashed on landing at Tetala Gaon in the state of Assam, killing all five of the crew, but sparing the lives of all 16 of the passengers. The jet had been on its way to Jorhat, but navigation problems led to the plane flying past the larger city before making an emergency landing.
- The Incredible Hulk, based upon the popular Marvel Comics feature of the same name, was adapted to television as a pilot film starring veteran actor Bill Bixby as scientist David Bruce Banner), body builder Lou Ferrigno as Banner's alter ego, "The Hulk", and Jack Colvin as a news reporter pursuing him. One critic described the film as "the best adaptation of a comic book character to television" but complained of the transformation sequence, which he said "makes the Hulk look like a giant green night light." Two TV movies proved popular enough for the CBS network to adapt the show to a regular series that would run from 1978 to 1982.
- Died: Betty Balfour (stage name for Florence Woods), 75, British silent film star

== November 5, 1977 (Saturday) ==
- In advance of November 7 celebrations of the 60th anniversary of the Bolshevik Revolution, the Soviet Union's official news agency, Tass, announced that amnesty was being granted to non-political prisoners who in different categories. Veterans of the Great Patriotic War (World War II), decorated heroes of the Soviet Union or a Soviet republic, and women and children were set free if they were serving terms of five or fewer years. A complete pardon was given to all male inmates 60 and older; women 55 and older; mothers of minor children; pregnant women; and disabled prisoners. Tass added that the decree of the Supreme Soviet "does not apply to persons convicted for particularly dangerous offenses against the state", or to "particularly dangerous recidivists" or "those convicted for grave crimes."
- A bus collision caused by "a stray camel" killed seven Dutch tourists in Israel, and injured 14 others. The dead were passengers in a minibus that was taking the tourists to Eilat, after the driver swerved to avoid a camel crossing the winding desert road and went into the path of a larger tour bus traveling the other way.
- Died:
  - Guy Lombardo, 75, Canadian big band leader
  - René Goscinny, 51, French comic book writer who created the Asterix adventure series, died of a heart attack while undergoing a stress test at his doctor's office

== November 6, 1977 (Sunday) ==
- In the U.S. state of Georgia, flash floods killed 39 people when the Kelly Barnes Dam burst and sent reservoir waters downhill to, located above Toccoa Falls Institute, a small Bible college. At 4:30 in the morning, pressure from rising waters caused the 40-year-old dam to break, sending 112 million gallons of water down on the small college and the 8,300 person town of Toccoa, Georgia. Two of the 39 deaths were volunteer firemen who had been warning residents of homes to evacuate.
- The Chief Minister of the Indian state of Jammu and Kashmir, Sheikh Mohammad Abdullah, issued a security ordinance allowing the state government to jail people for up to two years without charges, as well as to ban newspapers from reporting "information that may incite people to commit acts prejudicial to Kashmir's security."

== November 7, 1977 (Monday) ==
- The Italian criminal gang Banda della Magliana committed its first major crime, kidnapping Duke Massimiliano Grazioli. Despite payment of the demanded ransom of 1.5 billion lire, the kidnappers killed Grazioli anyway.
- Bernard Pomerance's play The Elephant Man, based on the life of a victim of deformity, Joseph Merrick (1862—1890) was staged for the first time, premiering at the Hampstead Theatre in London. It would debut on Broadway in 1979, winning a Tony Award for Best Play. The successful play is unrelated to a film about Merrick with the same name. The successful 1980 film was based on the 1923 Frederick Treves book. The Elephant Man and Other Reminiscences rather than the play.

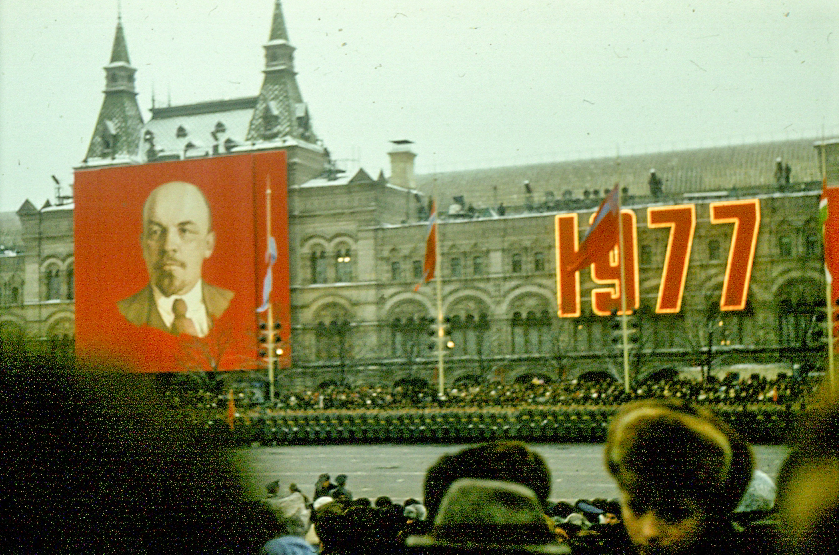
60th Anniversary of the October Revolution Parade in Moscow's Red Square

- The Soviet Union celebrated the 60th anniversary of the October Revolution with a parade through Moscow's Red Square. Returning to the tradition of displaying the nation's military might, the parade included the first public showing of the new T-72 battle tank.
- Born: Paul Buchheit, American computer engineer and creator of the Google e-mail service Gmail; in Webster, New York
- Died: Giorgio De Stefano, 36, Italian mobster and a boss of the organized crime syndicate 'Ndrangheta, was lured to a meeting in Santo Stefano in Aspromonte and murdered by a mob enforcer. The enforcer, Giuseppe Suraci, would later be killed on orders of Giorigio's brother Paolo De Stefano.

== November 8, 1977 (Tuesday) ==
- Greek archaeologist Manolis Andronikos discovered the tomb of Philip II of Macedon, the father of Alexander the Great, at Vergina.
- San Francisco voters elected Harvey Milk, the first openly gay elected official of any large city in the U.S., as City Supervisor

== November 9, 1977 (Wednesday) ==
- Egypt's President Anwar Sadat spoke at the opening of the new session of the nation's parliament, the Egyptian People's Assembly, and told a cheering audience that he was prepared to travel to Israel in order to pursue a peace agreement. Sadat, the first Arab leader to announce a willingness to accept the existence of the Jewish State of Israel, told the legislators, "Israel would be astonished when they hear me say this. But I say it. I am ready to go even to their home, to the Knesset and discuss peace with them if need be." The next day, Israel's prime minister Menahem Begin told a delegation from the U.S. Congress that he would accept Sadat's offer to come to Jerusalem and that he would personally greet him at the airport, adding "We shall receive him with all honor due a president."
- General Hugo Banzer, president of the military government of Bolivia, announced that constitutional democracy would be restored in the South American nation in 1978, with elections to be held on July 6 and transfer from military to civilian rule on August 6. Banzer had earlier stated that the transition would occur no earlier than 1980. On December 1, Banzer, who had been expected to easily win an election, announced that he would not be a candidate, but gave no explanation.
- Israeli fighter bombers attacked the Lebanese cities of Azzieh and Nahariya in reprisal for raids by Palestinian terrorists into Israel. Lebanon reported the deaths of more than 100 civilians.
- Died:
  - Gertrude Astor, 90, American film actress
  - William C. Sullivan, 65, former director of domestic intelligence operations for the FBI, was killed in a hunting accident in New Hampshire after a fellow hunter mistook him for a deer. In January, the 21-year-old hunter had his hunting license revoked and was assessed with a $500 fine.

== November 10, 1977 (Thursday) ==
- Police in South Africa arrested more than 600 black South Africans during a six-hour raid in Pretoria, including almost 100 children, on charges of refusing to obey South Africa's internal passport laws and other apartheid regulations. The government announced a new law giving authorities power to seize property, "without legal process" if a person refused or failed to comply with orders by the Interior Ministry. The measure followed the United Nations embargo against further sales of weapons.
- The first attempt in more than three years by New York City, to sell municipal bonds, was abandoned after the sale of $200,000,000 of revenue anticipation notes was given "the lowest possible" rating, MIG-4, from Moody's Investors Service. The financially encumbered U.S. city had not offered a sale of notes since March, 1975.
- Born: Brittany Murphy, U.S. film actress known for Clueless and 8 Mile; in Atlanta (d. of pneumonia, 2009)
- Died: Dennis Wheatley, 80, British novelist

== November 11, 1977 (Friday) ==
- In the town of Iri, located in South Korea's North Jeolla province, 57 people were killed and 1,348 were injured by the explosion of a freight train carrying 33 tons of dynamite. The blast damaged or set fire to 500 buildings around the railroad station. Most of the dead and injured had been seated in a theater near the station, attending a concert by a popular Korean singer, Ha Chunwa (who survived the blast with minor injuries). The disaster was traced to a careless security guard, Shin Moo Il who admitted that he lit candles while on the train after getting drunk, then fell asleep without extinguishing the candles. He told investigators that "he awoke to find his quilt on fire and the freight car filled with fire and smoke. He said he ran from the car, which exploded three or four minutes later.
- Born:
  - Scoot McNairy, U.S. film and TV actor; in Dallas
  - Maniche (Nuno Ricardo de Oliveira Ribeiro), Portuguese footballer with 52 caps for the Portugal national team; in Lisbon

== November 12, 1977 (Saturday) ==
- The Vienna Convention on Civil Liability for Nuclear Damage, signed on May 21, 1963, went into effect to govern liability in signatory nations for damages in case of a nuclear accident.
- The first "Reclaim the Night" marches in the United Kingdom took place, starting with a protest by the Leeds Revolutionary Feminist Group in England.
- A cyclone struck southern India, killing at least 350 people.
- Voting took place in the small island nation of Nauru after President Bernard Dowiyogo dissolved the 18-member Nauruan Parliament following lobbying by former president Hammer DeRoburt. With 52 candidates running, Dowiyogo's Nauru Party won 9 seats, DeRoburt candidates won 8, and an independent candidate who supported the Nauru Party won the other contested seat.
- Born:
  - Kavita K. Barjatya, Indian TV and film producer; in Mumbai
  - Nkechi Amare Diallo, college instructor president of the NAACP chapter in Spokane, Washington from 2014 to 2015, who presented herself as being African-American until she was found to be a Caucasian of European descent, with a real name of Rachel Anne Dolezal; in Libby, Montana
- Died:
  - Ingrid Schubert, 33, West German terrorist with the Red Army Faction (Baader-Meinhoff gang), hanged herself in her cell at Stadelheim Prison in Munich Schubert had been transferred from Stammheim Prison in Stuttgart following the October 18 triple suicide of Andreas Baader, Gudrun Ensslin and Jan-Carl Raspe.
  - Lieutenant Colonel Atnafu Abate, 46, vice chairman of Ethiopia's ruling military council, the Derg, was executed after falling into disfavor with the Derg's chairman, Mengistu Haile Mariam. The Ethiopian News Agency published a report the next day that "a revolutionary step" had been taken against Abate, using a euphemism for an execution.

== November 13, 1977 (Sunday) ==
- The east African nation of Somalia severed its ties with the Soviet Union, expelling all Soviet military advisers, ending the USSR's use of Somalian air and naval facilities, and renouncing its 1974 treaty of friendship with the Soviets. The decision followed Soviet support for Ethiopia in the Ogaden War between Somali and Ethiopian troops, and the presence of Cuban troops fighting alongside the Ethiopian Army.
- The popular American comic strip Li'l Abner, written by Al Capp, made its final appearance after a run of 43 years that had started on August 13, 1934. With humor based on social commentary and parody, and stereotypical hillbilly characters drawn from Appalachian culture, Capp had created the fictional mountain town of "Dogpatch" for telling stories.
- Born: Huang Xiaoming, Chinese TV actor and the star of The Prince of Han Dynasty; in Qingdao, Shandong province

== November 14, 1977 (Monday) ==
- In the Philippines, a fire killed at least 44 people in the Hotel Filipinas in Manila. The blaze apparently started after Typhoon Kim, which had killed at least 16 people, caused a power outage blackout. The blaze started in a guest room on the fifth floor of the seven-story hotel and was believed to have been caused by faulty electrical wiring, but might have been caused by candles burning during the blackout.
- Died:
  - A. C. Bhaktivedanta Swami Prabhupada, 81, Indian Hindu spiritualist who founded the Hare Krishna movement
  - Ferdinand Heim, 82, Nazi German general during World War II, held prisoner in both Nazi Germany and the United Kingdom

== November 15, 1977 (Tuesday) ==
- Reza Pahlavi II, the unpopular Shah of Iran and the Middle Eastern nation's absolute monarch, arrived at the White House on his last official visit to the a U.S. president, and was greeted by thousands of Iranian protesters. In "the most turbulent day the White House has seen since the antiwar demonstrations of 1969-70," a riot that ensued that injured 107 people.
- After receiving approval from the Knesset, Israel's prime minister Begin extended a formal invitation to Egypt's president Sadat, inviting Sadat to visit Jerusalem and to speak to the Knesset.
- Born:
  - Sean Murray, American TV actor best known for portraying Agent Tim McGee on NCIS; in Bethesda, Maryland
  - Peter Phillips, British prince and businessman, as well as the first grandchild of Queen Elizabeth II, was born at St Mary's Hospital, London to Princess Anne and Captain Mark Phillips. At the time of his birth, Peter was fifth in line of succession to the British throne, after Princes Charles, Andrew, and Edward and Princess Anne.

== November 16, 1977 (Wednesday) ==
- The soundtrack to the film Saturday Night Fever was released. Featuring five new Bee Gees compositions, it would go on to become the best selling album up to that time.
- Born:
  - Oksana Baiul, Ukrainian figure skater and 1994 Olympic gold medalist; in Dnipropetrovsk, Ukrainian SSR (now Dnipro, Ukraine)
  - Maggie Gyllenhaal, U.S. film actor; in New York City
- Died: Princess Charlotte of Monaco, 79, former heiress presumptive to the throne of the Principality of Monaco and mother of Prince Rainier III

== November 17, 1977 (Thursday) ==
- Israel's prime minister Menahem Begin told a surprised audience that the president of Egypt, Anwar Sadat, would arrive in Jerusalem on Saturday to deliver an address to Israel's parliament, the Knesset, to arrive after sundown in order not to interfere with the Jewish Sabbath. Egypt's foreign minister Ismail Fahmy resigned in protest over Sadat's visit, and his successor, Mohammed Riad, quit soon afterward. Boutros Boutros-Ghali, who would later become the secretary-general of the United Nations, was then sworn in as the new foreign minister. On the same day, Syria's president Hafez Assad called on other Arab nations to oppose Sadat's overture to the Jewish state.
- Born: Ryk Neethling, South African swimmer and 2004 Olympic gold medalist, 2006 world champion; in Bloemfontein

== November 18, 1977 (Friday) ==
- The "first government-sponsored meeting for and about women" in the U.S., the National Women's Conference, opened in Houston for the first of four days.
- Robert Edward Chambliss was found guilty of four counts of first-degree murder 14 years after the 1963 16th Street Baptist Church bombing that had killed four young girls in Birmingham, Alabama. Chambliss was sentenced to life imprisonment. Chambliss's niece, a Methodist church pastor, had testified that Chambliss had told her of the bomb, "It wasn't meant to hurt anybody. It didn't go off when it was supposed to."
- The Steven Spielberg film Close Encounters of the Third Kind was released across North America.
- Born: Trent Barrett, Australian rugby league five-eighth; in Temora, New South Wales
- Died:
  - Kurt Schuschnigg, 79, Chancellor of Austria from 1934 to 1938 until the Anschluss, Nazi Germany's annexation of the republic
  - Victor Francen, 89, Belgian-born French and U.S. film actor

== November 19, 1977 (Saturday) ==
- Egyptian President Anwar Sadat became the first Arab leader to make an official visit to Israeli-controlled territory, meeting with Israeli prime minister Menachem Begin, seeking a permanent peace settlement. Speaking to the Knesset, President Sadat became the first Arab nation leader to offer to recognize Israel as a nation.
- TAP Portugal Flight 425 crashed at Madeira Airport in Portugal, killing 131 of the 164 people on board.
- Born:
  - Mette Frederiksen, Prime Minister of Denmark since 2019; in Aalborg
  - Kerri Strug, U.S. gymnast and Olympic gold medalist; in Tucson, Arizona

== November 20, 1977 (Sunday) ==
- Elections were held in Greece for the 300 seats of the Hellenic Parliament. Although the Nea Dimokratia party of Prime Minister Konstantinos Karamanlis lost 49 seats and its two-thirds majority, it still retained a majority with 171 seats overall. The PASOK (Panellínio Sosialistikó Kínima or Panhellenic Socialist Movement) party of Andreas Papandreou gained 81 seats, increasing its share seven-fold from 12 to 93 seats overall.
- Australian motorboat racer Ken Warby set a new water speed record as he drove his boat Spirit of Australia at 288.60 miles per hour (464.46 km/h).
- Walter Payton of the Chicago Bears rushed for 275 yards in an NFL game. Payton's record would be broken on October 22, 2000, by Corey Dillon of the Cincinnati Bengals, with 278 yards.
- The first "Soviet Super Cup" game of soccer football was played before 35,000 people in Tbilisi as a friendly match between the winner of the 1977 Soviet Cup tournament (FC Dynamo Moscow) and the first-place finisher of the 1977 Soviet Top League (FC Dynamo Kiev). Dynamo Moscow won, 1 to 0.
- Died: Şadiye Sultan, 90, former Ottoman Empire princess and Turkish socialite, died in Istanbul after having been allowed to return to Turkey in 1952.

== November 21, 1977 (Monday) ==
- The song "God Defend New Zealand", composed by John Joseph Woods in 1876 and setting to music a poem written by Thomas Bracken, became the nation's second national anthem. New Zealand also uses "God Save the King" on ceremonial occasions.
- In Argentina, the crash of Austral Líneas Aéreas Flight 9 killed 41 of the 74 passengers and all five of the crew. The BAC One-Eleven jet had departed Buenos Aires and was preparing to land at San Carlos de Bariloche when it crashed into a mountain near Cerro Pichileufú.
- Died: Lester Koenig, 59, American screenwriter and film producer, died of a heart attack.

== November 22, 1977 (Tuesday) ==
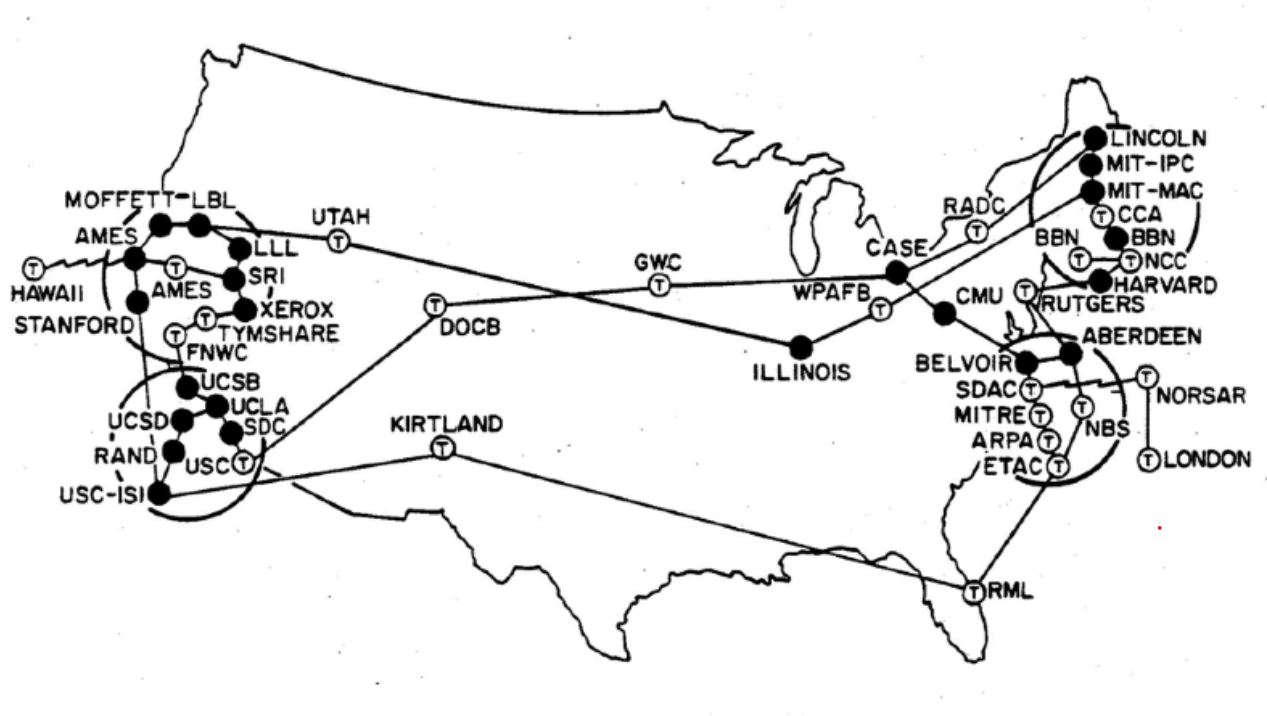
ARPANET nodes in 1977

- The first TCP/IP (the Transmission Control Protocol for the connecting nodes of the U.S. Department of Defense's ARPANET (Advanced Research Projects Agency Network) became operational, connecting three of the 111 existing nodes for what would become known as the Internet.
- British Airways and Air France inaugurated regular supersonic Concorde service to New York City on the same day. The Air France flight landed first on a flight from Paris, followed 90 seconds later by the British Airways jet. Both airlines had started regular flights to and from Washington D.C. on May 24, 1976.
- The first election for Governor of American Samoa concluded as Republican Peter Tali Coleman defeated Democrat A. P. Lutali in a run-off, two weeks after one of the candidates had received a majority of the November 8 vote. Prior to 1978, all American Samoan governors had been appointed by the U.S. president. Coleman had been the first Samoan native to be appointed to the position, serving from 1956 to 1961. Aifili Paolo Lutali continued to be the non-voting delegate at-large for American Samoa in the U.S. Congress, and would become the second elected governor in 1985.

== November 23, 1977 (Wednesday) ==
- In India, a cyclone struck the state of Andhra Pradesh and killed 20,000 people over the next two days. Most of the dead were drowned by powerful waves that swept inland from the Indian Ocean. The largest tidal wave struck Divi Taluk in the Krishna district and submerged dozens of villages and small towns.
- The white army of Rhodesia launched a five-day attack against black nationalist bases in neighboring Mozambique, killing at least 80 people and, according to the Rhodesian government, 1,200 guerrillas of Robert Mugabe's Zimbabwe African National Union (ZANU). The operation targeted bases near Chimoio and Tembue.
- Ali Askari, leader of the Patriotic Union of Kurdistan, met with Iraq's president Saddam Hussein to discuss an end to the Kurdish insurgency, in return to autonomy for Kurdistan and legalization of Kurdish political parties. Saddam rejected the proposal and fighting resumed. Askari would be killed by Kurdish Democratic Party forces less than a year later.
- In Argentina, a 7.4 magnitude earthquake killed 65 people in the San Juan Province, mostly in the city of Caucete.
- The G.I. Bill Improvement Act of 1977 was signed into law by U.S. president Carter, Public Law 95-202, making women who had served as Women Airforce Service Pilots (WASPs) in World War II eligible for U.S. veteran benefits.
- Died: George Mann, 71, American vaudeville performer in the comedy team of Barto and Mann

== November 24, 1977 (Thursday) ==
- Rhodesia's prime minister Ian Smith announced that for the first time that he would be willing to accept the principle of "one man, one vote" for the majority black Rhodesian population to participate in elections along with white voters, but subject to limits.
- Born: Colin Hanks, American film and TV actor; in Sacramento, California

== November 25, 1977 (Friday) ==
- Israel announced for the first time that it had discovered oil, as Energy Minister Yitzhak Modai announced a "gusher" in the Gulf of Suez, off of the coast of the Israeli-occupied Sinai Peninsula, which had been captured from Egypt during the Six-Day War in 1967. The strike was reported to be 50 miles (80 km) from the Abu Rodeis oil fields that had been returned to Egyptian control in 1975, and located in near the Egyptian oasis town of El Tor.
- A military court in the Philippines convicted former senator Benigno Aquino Jr., the primary leader of the opposition to President Ferdinand Marcos, of subversion, murder and illegal possession of a firearm, and sentenced him to death, along with Bernabe Buscayno and Victor Corpus of the New People's Army. The sentences of all three would be commuted by President Marcos later, and Aquino would be allowed to leave the country. Aquino would be assassinated on his return to Manila on August 21, 1983.
- The crash of a French Air Force transport aircraft killed all 28 passengers and four crew. The Nord Noratlas was transporting students from the Naval Training School at Saint-Mandrier-sur-Mer and had departed Toulon for Mont-de-Marsan when it struck a hillside near Béziers in the Hérault département.
- Died:
  - Richard Carlson, 65, American stage, film and TV actor and director, died of a cerebral hemorrhage.
  - Manouchehr Eghbal, 68, Prime Minister of Iran from 1956 to 1963 and chairman of the Board of the National Iranian Oil Company since 1963.

== November 26, 1977 (Saturday) ==
- Television viewers in Southampton, Portsmouth and other towns in South East England were surprised when pranksters replaced the ITV's news broadcast for six minutes with a message from "The Ashtar Galactic Command". At 5:10 in the afternoon, news presenter Andrew Gardner was reporting Rhodesia, when the audio was replaced by a voiceover that said "This is the voice of Vrillon, a representative of the Ashtar Galactic Command, speaking to you," then went on to warn viewers "so that you may communicate to your fellow beings the course you must take to avoid the disaster which threatens your world, and the beings on our worlds around you." After advising that "You know now that we are here, and that there are more beings on and around your Earth than your scientists admit," "Vrillon" thanked listeners for their attention and closed with "We are now leaving the planes of your existence. May you be blessed by the supreme love and truth of the cosmos."
- One week after his historic visit to Jerusalem, Egypt's president Anwar Sadat invited the foreign ministers of all Middle Eastern nations, including Israel, to come to Cairo for discussions for a peace conference. Sadat also invited the U.S., the USSR and the United Nations to send representatives.
- Qirjako Mihali was appointed as the deputy prime minister of Albania in the government of Premier Mehmet Shehu. After Shehu's suicide in 1981 following implication in a scandal, Mihali would not be accused, but Adil Çarçani would be appointed as the new premier.
- At the age of 15, Scott Endersby became the youngest player to ever appear in England's FA Cup, taking the field for Kettering Town F.C. in a game against Tilbury F.C. The result was subsequently voided for Kettering's use of an ineligible player, although Endersby would be allowed to play in the replay on December 5.
- The Marseille Metro, France's third metro system after Paris's (1900) and Lyon's (1974), opens.

== November 27, 1977 (Sunday) ==
- In East Germany, the explosion of a locomotive's boiler killed nine people, and injured 50 others, while the train was idling at the train station at Bitterfeld.

== November 28, 1977 (Monday) ==
- The Selous Scouts, special forces branch of the Rhodesian Army, carried out the first biochemical warfare assassinations with "poisoned jeans", the soaking of denim jeans with toxins that could be absorbed by the skin of the victim. Four ZANLA guerrillas (Zvabhenda, Kudakwashe, Jehova and Paul Manyere) died near the Wisha village in Mozambique "after wearing poisoned jeans and underpants."
- A Peruvian Navy patrol boat attacked an Ecuadorian fishing vessel, the San Francisco, that had crossed into Peru's territorial waters. One of the Ecuadorian crew was killed, and the San Francisco was later linked to drug smuggling into Peru. On January 18, 1978, the Ecuador Air Force would retaliate for the Peruvian Navy attack, flying into Peru's airspace and strafing a Peruvian Army outpost.
- Born: Fabio Grosso, Italian footballer with 48 caps for the Italy national team; in Rome
- Died: John L. McClellan, 81, U.S. senator for Arkansas since 1943, died one week after announcing that he would not run for a seventh term in office.

== November 29, 1977 (Tuesday) ==
- Voting was held for the 38 seats of the parliament of the New Hebrides, at the time jointly administered by the United Kingdom and France, and later independent as Vanuatu). The pro-independence party, the Vanua'aku Pati, boycotted the election and instead declared the New Hebrides to be an independent state under the name of "Vanuaaku", establishing a Vanuaaku People's Provisional Government. Vanuatu would achieve independence in 1980.
- Romanian dissident Paul Goma was released from prison by order of dictator Nicolae Ceaușescu and flown into exile along with his wife and child.
- Born: Andy Beshear, U.S. politician, Governor of Kentucky since 2019; in Louisville, Kentucky
- Died: Carlo Casalegno, 61, Italian editor and columnist for the Turin newspaper La Stampa, died 13 days after he was fatally wounded by terrorists of the Red Brigade.

== November 30, 1977 (Wednesday) ==
- Voting was held for white people in South Africa for all but one of the 165 seats of the House of Assembly. Out of 2.2 million registered white voters, only half participated, while the nation's 19 million black people were ineligible to vote. The ruling National Party of Prime Minister B. J. Vorster, which already had 122 of 164 seats, gained 12 seats. The Progressive Federal Party, led by Colin Eglin finished a distant second with 17 seats.
- In Sweden, a landslide destroyed 67 houses and killed nine people in Tuve, a small suburb of the city of Gothenburg.
- Born: Nelsan Ellis, U.S. film and TV actor; in Harvey, Illinois (d. of alcohol withdrawal syndrome, 2017)
- Died: Olga Petrova (stage name for Muriel Harding), 93, British-born American film actress
