= Porochista Khakpour =

American writer (born 1978)

- پوروچیستا خاکپور
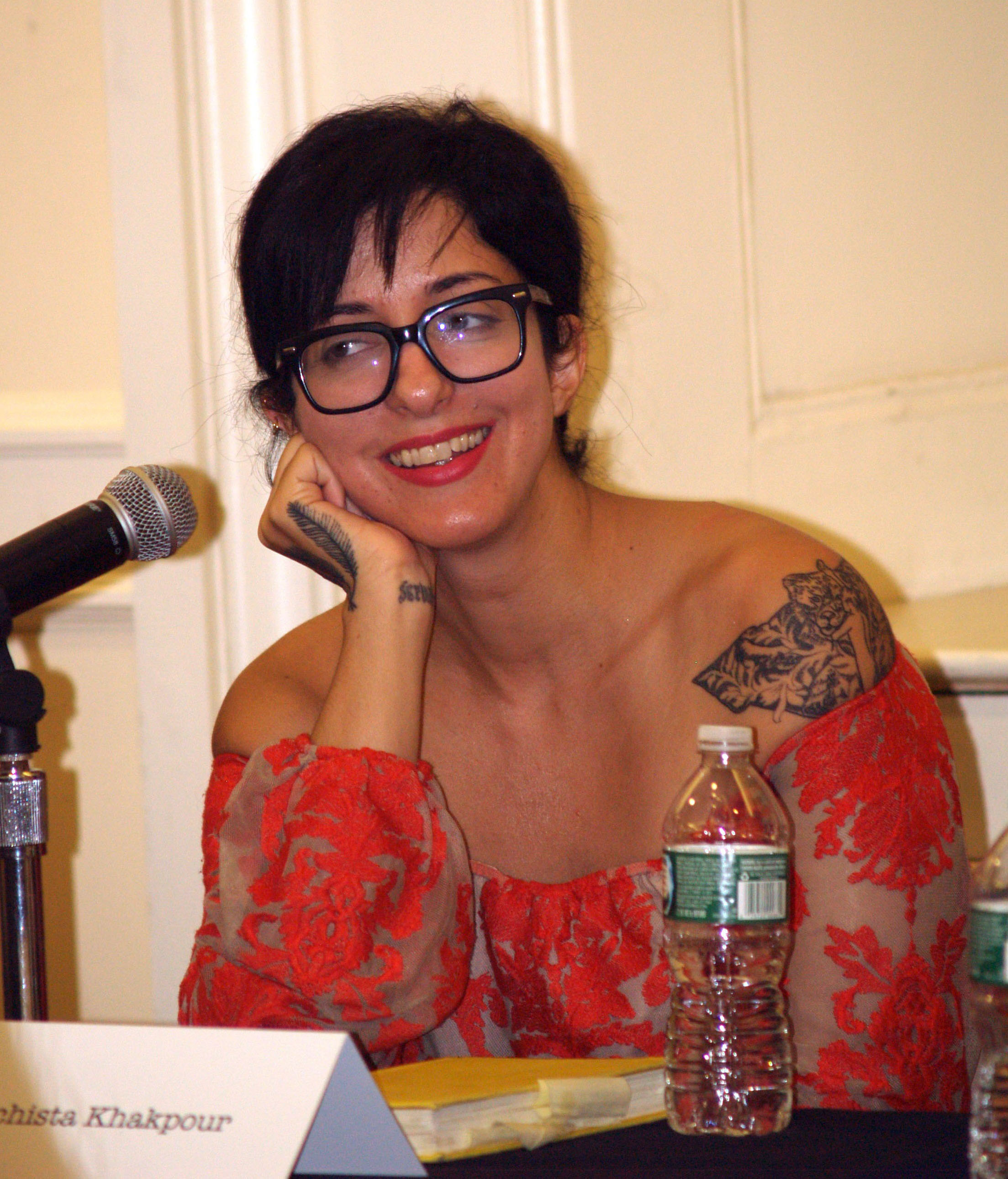
- Khakpour at the 2014 Brooklyn Book Festival
- Born: 17 January 1978 (age 48); Tehran, Iran
- Education: Sarah Lawrence College (BA); Johns Hopkins University (MA)
- Occupations: Novelist, essayist, journalist
- Writing career
- Years active: 2000–present
- Genres: Literary fiction; memoir
- Notable works: Sons and Other Flammable Objects; The Last Illusion; Sick; Brown Album; Tehrangeles
- Website: www.porochistakhakpour.com

Porochista Khakpour (Persian: پوروچیستا خاکپور; born 17 January 1978) is an Iranian-American novelist, essayist, and journalist.

A refugee from Iran whose family fled the Iran–Iraq War and the Islamic Revolution, Khakpour grew up in the Greater Los Angeles area before moving to New York to attend Sarah Lawrence College.

She is the author of five books, including her 2007 debut novel Sons and Other Flammable Objects. Her nonfiction essays have been published in The New York Times, the Los Angeles Times, Guernica, CNN, The Paris Review, Slate, Elle, The Guardian, and The Wall Street Journal.

== Early life ==
Khakpour was born on 17 January 1978, in Tehran, Iran. Her first name, Porochista, is of ancient Zoroastrian origin and derives from "Pourucista", one of Zarathustra’s daughters.

Her parents, Manijeh and Asha Khakpour, met while working together at the Atomic Energy Organization of Iran (AEOI). Manijeh is an accountant, while Asha is a theoretical nuclear physicist who attended MIT on a full scholarship. Khakpour's paternal grandmother was from the village of Garakan, while her mother's family is from Hamadan. Khakpour's maternal great-uncle, Akbar Etemad, was the AEOI's founding president and is regarded as "the father of Iran’s nuclear programme."

Khakpour has described herself as an "infant of the Islamic Revolution and [a] toddler of the Iran–Iraq War". After the outbreak of the Iran-Iraq War in 1980, her family fled Iran as refugees, transiting through Turkey, France, and Switzerland before eventually resettling in the Greater Los Angeles area. As a 3-year-old refugee crisscrossing Europe on trains, Khakpour told her parents stories to pass the time, which her father wrote down and she would illustrate.

Khakpour has written of her family's life as a "riches-to-rags" story. When Khakpour's family first arrived in the United States, they lived in a hotel on Skid Row in Downtown Los Angeles; she played daily in nearby MacArthur Park. Her family made their way to the San Gabriel Valley, briefly living in Monterey Park and Alhambra before finally moving into a two-bedroom, one-bathroom dingbat apartment in South Pasadena, where Khakpour grew up. Until age 17, Khakpour shared a small bedroom with her younger brother.

Her family was "one of a few isolated lower-middle-class Iranian families" in South Pasadena, far away from the affluent Iranian-American enclave of Tehrangeles centered on the Westside of Los Angeles. She first began writing novels in elementary school.

== Education ==
Khakpour grew up as the only Iranian at her elementary school, middle school, and high school. She was the editor-in-chief of her high school newspaper, graduating from South Pasadena High School in 1996.

Khakpour received a Hearst Scholarship to attend Sarah Lawrence College, where she studied under Danzy Senna and Victoria Redel. During her junior year, she studied abroad in England at the University of Oxford's Wadham College. Khakpour graduated from Sarah Lawrence in 2000 with a BA in liberal arts, with a concentration in creative writing and literature.

In 2001, Khakpour was living in the East Village, where she witnessed the 9/11 attacks from the windows of her then-boyfriend's twenty-fifth floor Manhattan apartment. As a Middle Eastern American, she has described the attacks as "the turning point of my life." Khakpour has been described as a "9/11-era chronicler", and the attacks figure prominently in both of her first two novels, Sons and Other Flammable Objects and The Last Illusion. Khakpour became an American citizen in November 2001, two months after the 9/11 attacks.

Khakpour received her MA in creative writing from Johns Hopkins University and the Johns Hopkins Writing Seminars program in 2003, where she studied under Stephen Dixon and Alice McDermott.

After graduating from Hopkins, Khakpour was named a 2003 fellow of the academy for Alternative Journalism at Northwestern University’s Medill School of Journalism. At Medill, Khakpour was mentored by Charles F. Whitaker. While a reporting fellow at The Chicago Reader, she spent three months reporting undercover on Skydive Chicago, then the deadliest skydiving center in rural Illinois.

== Career ==
=== Writing ===
Before publishing her first novel, Khakpour worked as a journalist, covering arts and entertainment as well as producing in-depth investigative journalism. As a 19-year-old student at Sarah Lawrence, she interned at The Village Voice, where she was published for the first time. She later interned at Spin magazine. In the early 2000s, she was a columnist at both Paper and New York magazines, and wrote articles for MTV.com, BET.com, VH1.com, Gear, Flaunt, and Urb.

At age 29, Khakpour published her debut novel, Sons and Other Flammable Objects, in September 2007. It has been interpreted as a response to and "rewriting" of Sadegh Hedayat's The Blind Owl. Sons and Other Flammable Objects was recognized as a New York Times Book Review Editor's Choice, won the 77th California Book Award in First Fiction., and included on the Chicago Tribune's 2007 "Fall's Best" list. The novel was also shortlisted for the William Saroyan International Prize for Writing, and longlisted for the 2008 Dylan Thomas Prize. An Italian edition was published by Bompiani in 2009.

In 2011, Khakpour was the guest editor of Guernica's first Iranian-American issue, curating works from writers including Saïd Sayrafiezadeh, Azadeh Moaveni, Nahid Rachlin, Hooman Majd, Roger Sedarat, and Sholeh Wolpé.

Khakpour's second novel, The Last Illusion, was released on 13 May 2014. Much of the book was completed during writers' residencies at the Virginia Center for the Creative Arts (VCCA), Yaddo, and Ucross, and at the New Mexico home of her friend Valerie Plame. Set in New York City during "the Y2K to 9/11 era", the book is a coming-of-age tale about an albino feral boy, Zal, and is a retelling of a legend from the Shahnameh, the Persian Book of Kings. Khakpour has described the novel as "a love letter to New York." The Last Illusion was named one of Flavorwire’s "15 Most Anticipated Books of 2014," one of The Millions’ "Most Anticipated" in its "The Great 2014 Book Review," and one of the Huffington Post's "30 Books You NEED to Read in 2014." The Last Illusion has also been published in Romanian by Polirom.

In 2018, Khakpour published Sick, a "memoir of chronic illness, misdiagnosis, addiction, and the myth of full recovery." Khakpour's most-widely read book, Sick was named one of Time magazine's best memoirs of 2018, and was recognized as a "Best Book of 2018" by Real Simple, Entropy, Mental Floss, Bitch Media, Autostraddle, The Paris Review, Literary Hub, and others. The Week magazine selected the memoir as 'Book of the week' in June 2018. Sick was published in the UK and the Commonwealth by Canongate in 2018. In 2022, the book was translated and published in a Hungarian edition.

In 2019, Amazon Original Stories published Parsnips in Love as an e-book, which became a best-selling short story.

In 2020, Khakpour published her fourth book, an essay collection entitled Brown Album: Essays on Exile and Identity, as a Vintage Original from Penguin Random House. The title is a deliberate reference to Joan Didion's The White Album. Brown Album was named one of Time's "100 Must-Read Books of 2020".

Khakpour's fifth book, Tehrangeles, was published in 2024. The book is a satire "of the rich and TikTok-famous", set amongst the Persian and Iranian neighborhood of the same name in Los Angeles. Tehrangeles follows the lives of the four Milani sisters, Iranian-American snack food heiresses on the verge of their own reality television show. Kirkus Reviews described the novel as "a kind of hyperreal neon inversion of Little Women, if the March girls had to deal with hashtags, eating disorders, microaggressions, and group chats". Tehrangeles was positively reviewed by Publishers Weekly, Booklist, and the Los Angeles Times. On 20 June 2024, Tehrangeles was selected as NPR's "Book of the Day."

=== Teaching ===
After completing her MA at Johns Hopkins University in 2003, Khakpour was named an Eliott Coleman Fellow and taught creative writing as a lecturer at Johns Hopkins.

Between 2008 and 2010, Khakpour was a visiting professor at Bucknell University. She subsequently moved to Santa Fe, New Mexico, to become an assistant professor of creative writing & literature at the College of Santa Fe, and later served on the faculty of Fairfield University’s low-residency MFA program. From 2011 to 2012, she was the Picador Guest Professor of Literature at the University of Leipzig in Germany.

From 2014 to 2017, Khakpour taught at Bard College as a writer-in-residence. Khakpour has also been a visiting writer at Wesleyan University (2014) and Northwestern University (2017).

Khakpour has held adjunct appointments at Columbia University, Fordham University, and Wesleyan University. She was guest faculty at the Vermont College of Fine Arts and the Stonecoast MFA Program in Creative Writing at the University of Southern Maine.

== Influences ==
Khakpour credits William Faulkner, Jamaica Kincaid, Forough Farrokhzad, Sadegh Hedayat, Vladimir Nabokov, James Salter, Herman Melville, Thomas Pynchon, Cormac McCarthy, Toni Morrison, and James Baldwin as writers who have influenced her work.

She is close friends with the Chinese avant-garde writer, Can Xue, who she regards as a mentor, "one of my most treasured inspirations and models", and "the greatest living writer on earth". In 2015, after nominating Can Xue for the Neustadt Prize as a member of the jury, Khakpour arranged for Can Xue and her husband Lu Yong to tour the United States. Khakpour wrote the introduction to the 2017 English translation of Can Xue's novel Frontier.

== Awards and recognition ==
Khakpour is a recipient of the 2012 National Endowment for the Arts (NEA) Literature Fellowship in Creative Writing (Prose). Khakpour has also received fellowships from the Sewanee Writers' Conference, Northwestern University, the Virginia Center for the Creative Arts, the Ucross Foundation, Yaddo and Djerassi. Her work has also been nominated for a Pushcart Prize.

She was on the jury of the PEN/Saul Bellow Award for Achievement in American Fiction 2018.

== Personal life ==
Khakpour was diagnosed with late-stage Lyme disease in 2012.

Khakpour identifies as Muslim, although she was raised agnostic by her family. She is openly queer and bisexual.

Khakpour currently lives in Harlem.

== See also ==
- List of Iranian women writers and poets

== Works ==
- Sons and Other Flammable Objects, New York: Grove Press, 2007. ISBN 9780802118530, OCLC 836838639
- The Last Illusion, London: Bloomsbury, 2016. ISBN 9781408858592, OCLC 990147921
- Sick: A Memoir, New York: Harper Collins, 2017. ISBN 9780062428738, OCLC 972254441
- Frontier (by Can Xue), Open Letter, 2017. Introduction by Porochista Khakpour. ISBN 978-1940953540
- The Good Immigrant USA – 26 writers reflect on America, editors: Nikesh Shukla and Chimene Suleyman, Dialogue Books, 2019. ISBN 9780349700373. The first essay is by Porochista Khakpour.
- Parsnips in Love, Amazon Original Stories, 2019.
- Brown Album: Essays on Exile and Identity, New York: Vintage, 2020. ISBN 9780525564713
- Better Than Sane: Tales from a Dangling Girl (by Alison Rose), Godine, 2023. Introduction by Porochista Khakpour. ISBN 978-1-56792-775-7
- Tehrangeles: A Novel, Pantheon, 2024 ISBN 978-1524747909
