= Sons and Other Flammable Objects =

2007 novel by Porochista Khakpour

Sons and Other Flammable Objects (2007) is a novel by the Iranian-American novelist Porochista Khakpour. It is published by Grove Press, New York City (ISBN 9780802118530).

The book depicts the struggles of an Iranian family, refugees of the Iranian Revolution, trying to make sense of their new lives in the United States, in an apartment in Pasadena, California. The main character is the teenager Xerxes Adam.

The history of the nation is embedded in the personal history of the characters, similar to The Blind Owl by Sadegh Hedayat.

The novel won the 77th California Book Award for First Fiction. It was also a New York Times Editor's Choice and included on the Chicago Tribune's 2007 "Fall's Best" list. It was also shortlisted for the William Saroyan International Prize for Writing, and long-listed for the 2008 Dylan Thomas Prize.

== Reviews ==
According to Kirkus Reviews, the characters are "caught between incompatible worlds, one past and romanticized, the other present but inaccessible." The New York Times praised the novel for its "punchy conversation, vivid detail, sharp humor." Grove Atlantic favorably compared it to Zadie Smith's White Teeth for its "rolling storytelling cadences and wry wit".
