= September 1977 =

Month of 1977

<<	September 1977					>>
Su	Mo	Tu	We	Th	Fr	Sa
				1	2	3
4	5	6	7	8	9	10
11	12	13	14	15	16	17
18	19	20	21	22	23	24
25	26	27	28	29	30

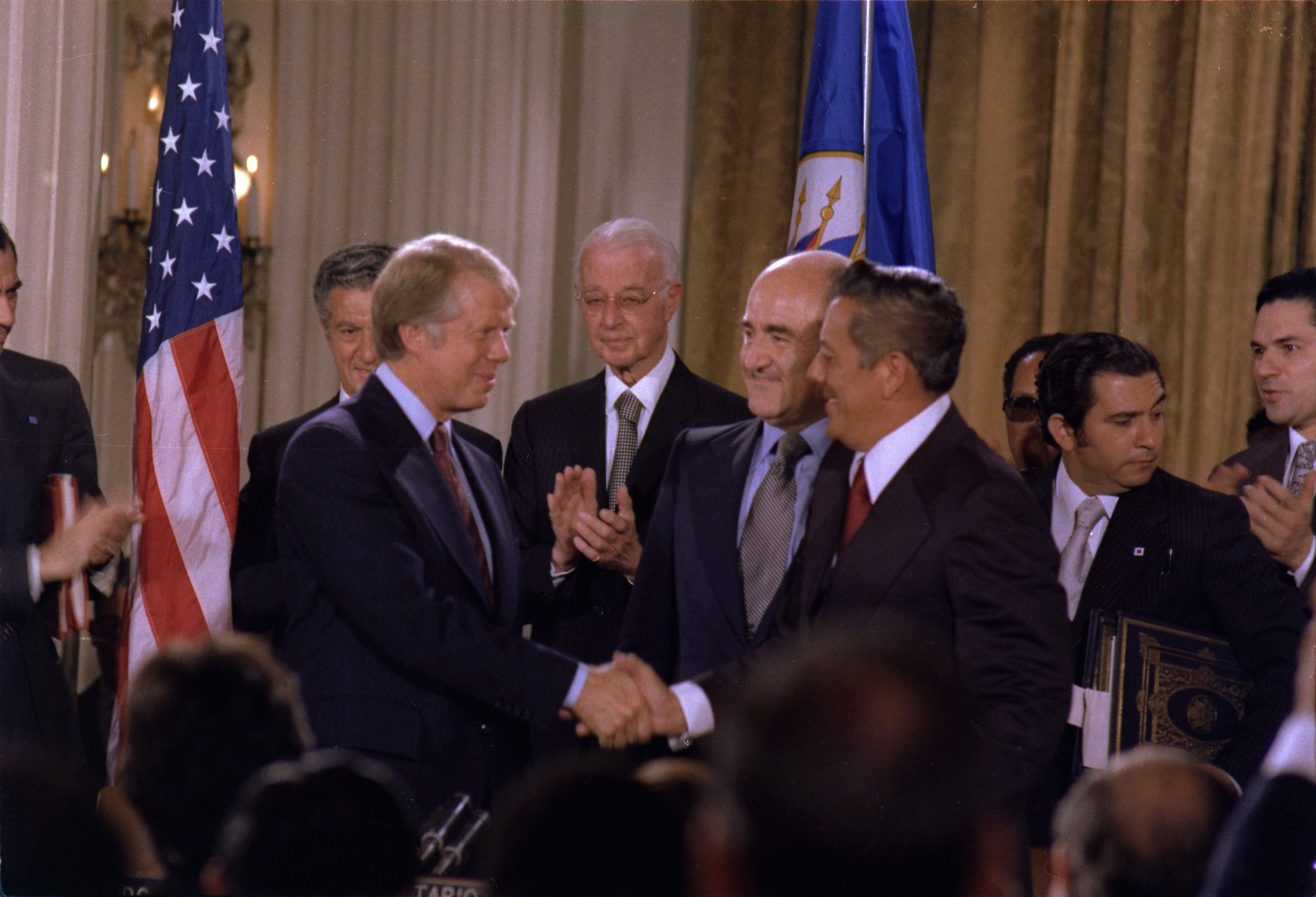
September 7, 1977: Panama Canal Treaties signed by U.S. President Jimmy Carter and Panama's Omar Torrijos

The following events occurred in September 1977:

== September 1, 1977 (Thursday) ==
- The United Kingdom nationalized its shipbuilding industry under the government-owned company British Shipbuilders, acquiring the assets of 27 private companies in accordance with the Aircraft and Shipbuilding Industries Act 1977. Sir Anthony Griffin, an Admiral in the Royal Navy, served as British Shipbuilders' first chairman. After closing half of the nation's shipyards, the company was then required to privatize its assets under the terms of the British Shipbuilders Act 1983, and closed all of its remaining shipyards by 1989.
- The United States agreed to let Japan begin the reprocessing of used nuclear fuel for two years, approving a proposal that had been made by Japan in 1970 to use reprocessed fuel at Tokai village northeast of Tokyo. The accord between the two allies averted a crisis between Japan, which was in need of a source of energy, and the U.S., which was seeking to halt the increased availability of plutonium.
- The southern African nation of Angola announced that its government had acquired 61% of the shares of Diamang Diamond Company (Companhia de Diamantes de Angola), the main source of the country's wealth, and majority control of the company, with the remaining 39% held by foreign investors.
- Born: David Albelda, Spanish footballer with 51 appearances for the Spain national team as a defensive midfielder; in La Pobla Llarga, Province of Valencia
- Died: Ethel Waters, 80, African-American singer, film and TV actress

== September 2, 1977 (Friday) ==
- The U.S. Center for Disease Control announced the existence of "a new strain of bacterial pneumonia resistant to penicillin and most other antibodies, in the form of a mutated, drug-resistant derivation of pneumococcal pneumonia.
- Born:
  - Frédéric Kanouté French and Malian footballer with 38 appearances for the Mali national team as a striker; in Sainte-Foy-lès-Lyon.
  - Elitsa Todorova, Bulgarian singer; in Varna
  - Jimmy Smith, American mixed martial artist and sports broadcaster; in Fresno, California
- Died: Archimedes Trajano, 22, Philippine student activist, was found dead two days after insulting Imee Marcos, the daughter of President Ferdinand Marcos, who had been appointed as the chairman of the nation's youth council, the Kabataang Barangay.

== September 3, 1977 (Saturday) ==
- Former Prime Minister of Pakistan Zulfiqar Ali Bhutto, who had recently been released from prison after his July 5 overthrow, was arrested again while campaigning for office in anticipation of elections in October. Bhutto had been set free on July 28 and remained out for 37 days before being arrested on charges of conspiracy in the murder of a political opponent.
- Japanese baseball player Sadaharu Oh of Tokyo's Yomiuri Giants (Bunkyō ward) hit the 756th home run of his career, one more than the Major League Baseball record of Hank Aaron, who had retired in 1976 with 755 career home runs. His hit came during an 8 to 1 win over the Yakult Swallows (in the Shinjuku ward of Tokyo), on a pitch by the Swallows' Kojiro Suzuki. Oh would play three more years, retiring at the end of the 1980 Central League season on October 12, 1980, with 868 homers.
- The Grateful Dead set a record of selling 107,019 tickets to a rock concert, playing at Raceway Park near Englishtown, New Jersey. The concert set a U.S. and world record and would continue to be the highest attended ticketed concert in the U.S. as of 2023. A concert by Frank Sinatra in Brazil would break the record on January 26, 1980, with 175,000 tickets sold.
- U.S. Christian evangelist became the first preacher to make a speaking tour within a Communist nation as he arrived in Budapest for an eight-day tour of Hungary. Graham was cleared by the Hungarian Communist Party chairman Janos Kadar to appear as the guest of the Hungarian Council of Free Churches.
- Born: Olof Mellberg, Swedish footballer and defender with 117 caps for the Sweden national team; in Gullspång
- Died: Albert Muwalo, 50, Minister of State and later Minister without Portfolio for Malawi until October 27, 1976, was hanged at the national prison in Zomba after being convicted on charges of corruption.

== September 4, 1977 (Sunday) ==
- The Golden Dragon massacre took place inside the Golden Dragon Restaurant at 822 Washington Street in San Francisco's Chinatown, with 16 people shot, five of them fatally. A group of four members of the Joe Boys youth gang attempted to kill the leaders of the rival Wah Ching criminal organization, to retaliate for a July 4 attack that killed a Joe Boys member. None of the victims were members of the Wah Ching gang; the five people killed were a waiter and four customers.
- All 33 people aboard a SAN Ecuador airlines Vickers 764 Viscount were killed when the aircraft crashed into the side of a mountain in the Cajas Range. The plane had taken off from Guayaquil on a short flight to Cuenca.
- Cork GAA defeated Wexford GAA, 1–17 to 3-8 (equivalent to 20 to 17) to win the championship of the Gaelic Athletic Association in the sport of hurling, before 63,168 people at Croke Park in Dublin.
- Died: E. F. Schumacher, 66, German-born British economist and statistician known for the Buddhist economics theory, died of a heart attack while on a lecture tour of Europe.

== September 5, 1977 (Monday) ==
- Not realized at the time by Earth astronomers, the asteroid 2022 QX4 passed within 0.00086 astronomical units or 81,000 miles (130,000 km) of Earth. By comparison, the average distance from the Earth to the Moon almost three times as far 238,900 miles (384,500 km). The asteroid, about 130 feet (40 m) in diameter, would not be discovered from Earth until August 24, 2022, by the Asteroid Terrestrial-impact Last Alert System (ATLAS)., after which its trajectory would be calculated retroactively and prospectively.
- The interplanetary probe Voyager 1 was launched from the United States at 8:56 in the morning (1256 UTC), following the August 20 launch of Voyager 2 toward Jupiter, Saturn, Uranus and Neptune.
- West German Employers Association President Hanns Martin Schleyer was kidnapped in Cologne. The kidnappers killed three escorting police officers and his chauffeur, and demanded the release of 14 Red Army Faction prisoners in return for Schleyer's safe return. Schleyer would be murdered by his captors on October 18.

== September 6, 1977 (Tuesday) ==
- The August 26 federal grand jury indictment of South Korean businessman Tongsun Park was publicly revealed, and implicated the names of 24 members of the U.S. Congress in the 36 counts against Park.
- The Scottish Opera presentation of Mary, Queen of Scots, composed by Thea Musgrave, premiered at the King's Theatre, Edinburgh.
- The record attendance for a Canadian Football League game was set when a crowd of 69,093 people came to Olympic Stadium in Montreal to watch a regular season CFL game. The unbeaten (7-0=0) Montreal Alouettes were upset by the visiting Toronto Argonauts (whose record was 2-5-0), 20 to 14.
- Television actress Danielle Spencer, a 12-year-old co-star of the ABC sitcom What's Happening!!, was seriously injured in an auto accident shortly before the start of the show's second season.
- Born: Katalin Novák, President of Hungary since 2022, known for being the first woman and the youngest person ever to serve as the Hungarian president; in Szeged
- Died:
  - John Littlewood, 92, British mathematician known for the Littlewood conjecture, the Littlewood polynomial, Littlewood–Paley theory, the two Hardy–Littlewood conjectures
  - Arthur M. Loew, 69, American film producer for MGM and owner of the Loew's International chain of theaters

== September 7, 1977 (Wednesday) ==
- Two treaties between Panama and the United States were signed for the eventual transfer of the Panama Canal, as U.S. President Jimmy Carter and the Panamanian Head of Government, General Omar Torrijos, met at the Washington DC headquarters of the Organization of American States. In the Panama Canal Treaty, the U.S. agreed that control of the canal would be transferred to Panama at midnight on December 31, 1999, after which Panama would have control of the canal and be responsible for its maintenance and its defense. In the other agreement, the Neutrality Treaty, Panama agreed that the U.S. would have "the permanent right to defend the canal from any threat that might interfere with its continued neutral service to ships of all nations." Both treaties would ratified by the U.S. Senate on April 18, 1979.
- Former FBI agent G. Gordon Liddy, who was convicted of conspiracy, burglary, and illegal wiretapping in connection with the break-in of the 1972 break-in of the Democratic National Committee that led to the Watergate scandal, was released from prison after having been incarcerated for four and one-half years.
- A judge in Dane County, Wisconsin, Archie Simonson, was removed from office by an overwhelming margin in a recall election, after making remarks on May 25 justifying rape of a girl because of the clothes that she was wearing.

== September 8, 1977 (Thursday) ==
- Interpol issued a resolution against the copyright infringement of video tapes and other material. The warning is still cited in warnings at the start of all videocassettes and DVDs.
- At least 50 people in Egypt were killed, and 120 injured, when a train derailed while moving along a curved track at excess speed, and then plunged down an embankment near Asyut.
- All 25 people on a Burma Airways Twin Otter 300 were killed when the airplane departed Mong Hsat but failed to land as scheduled in Keng Tung. The wreckage was found three days later.
- The first Chia Pet was introduced by Joseph Enterprises as a novelty terracotta decoration that sprouted the fast-growing and flowering plant chia from seeds embedded inside the decoration.
- Died: Zero Mostel (stage name for Samuel Joel Mostel, 62, American stage and film actor known as the star of the musical Fiddler on the Roof, winner of three Tony Awards (1961, 1962 and 1964)

== September 9, 1977 (Friday) ==
- The public execution of 12 Ugandan prisoners, convicted of the June 18 attempt to overthrow President Idi Amin, took place in front of the Queen's Clock Tower in the capital city of Kampala. Three other people were shot in addition to the coup d'etat plotters, as shooting started at 5:05 and prisoners were killed "one by one... as they stood tied against sand-filled water drums." The eight ringleaders were left alive at the prison in Nakasero of Uganda's secret police, the State Research Bureau, pending a public confession of their role in the coup attempt.
- The French weekly news and entertainment magazine VSD (an abbreviation for "Vendredi, Samedi, Dimanche", the French words for Friday, Saturday and Sunday) published its first issue.
- Born: Soulja Slim (stage name for James Tapp Jr.), American rap artist; in New Orleans (murdered, 2003)
- Died:
  - Kenneth O'Donnell, 53, U.S. adviser to President John F. Kennedy
  - Jim Liberman, 31, American drag racing driver, was killed when he crashed into a SEPTA transit bus in West Goshen, Pennsylvania.

== September 10, 1977 (Saturday) ==
- Hamida Djandoubi became the last person to be executed by guillotine. Convicted of the 1974 murder of Élisabeth Bousquet, he was put to death in France at the Baumettes Prison in Marseille at 4:40 in the morning.
- Christa Vahlensieck of West Germany broke the record for fastest women's marathon by completing the Berlin Marathon in 2 hours, 34 minutes and 48 seconds, topping the record set on May 1 by Chantal Langlacé of France by 28 seconds.
- U.S. tennis player Chris Evert won the U.S. Open tournament at Forest Hills, New York, defeating Australia's Wendy Turnbull, 7-6, 6-2. The win marked the 23rd consecutive clay court tournament won by Evert, and her 113th consecutive match.

== September 11, 1977 (Sunday) ==
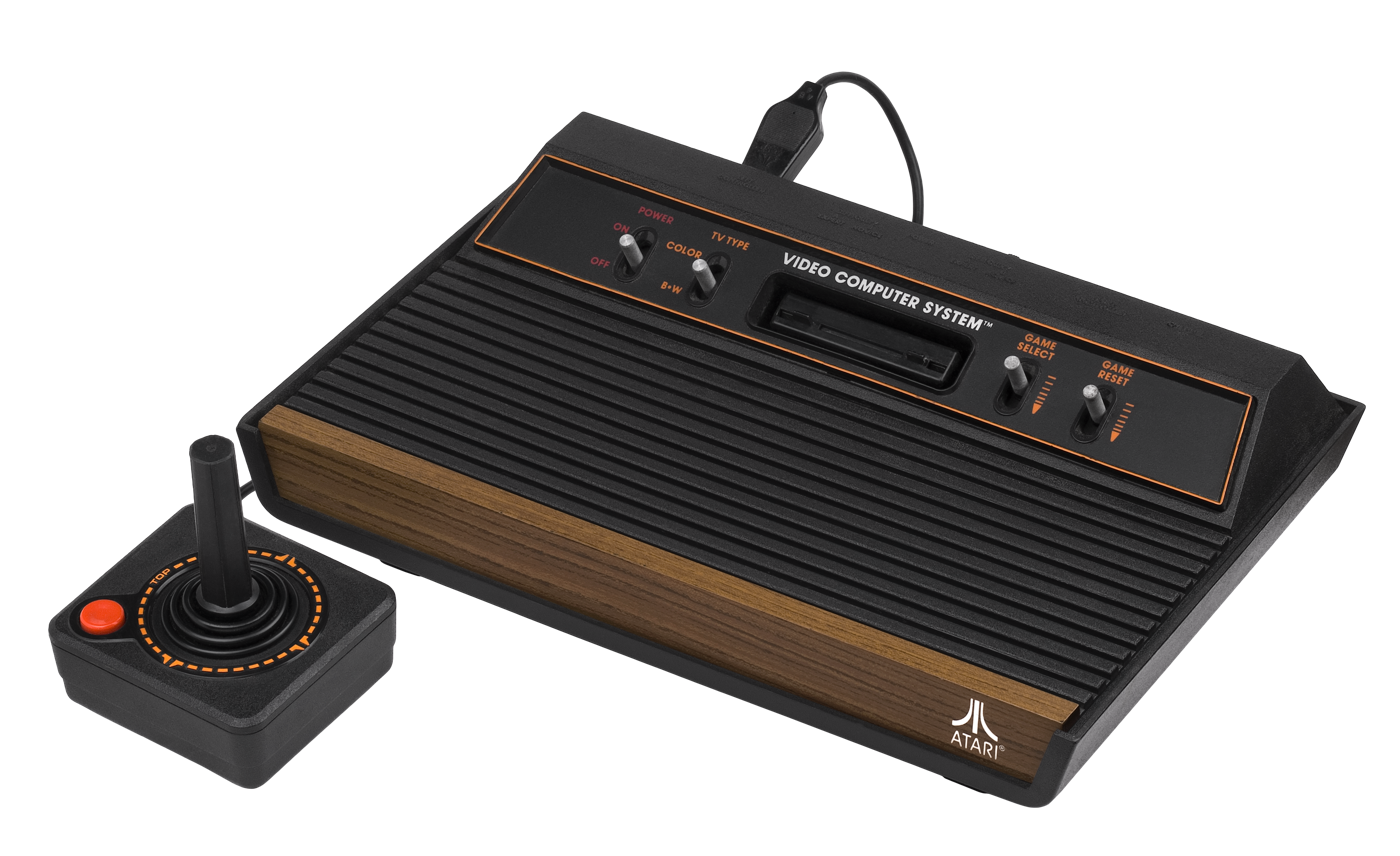
The Atari 2600

graphics for "Combat"

- Atari, Inc. of Japan released its Atari 2600 video computer system in North America, through the Sears department store chain. Initially, the standard system came with two joystick controls and a cartridge for the game "Combat". Eight other cartridges could be purchased separately.
- Mario Andretti wins at the 1977 Italian Grand Prix in Monza Circuit.
- The League of Filipino Students was founded in Manila, initially to protest repression of universities and colleges, as well as increases in tuition.
- Guillermo Vilas defeated Jimmy Connors to win the men's singles in the U.S. Open tennis tournament.
- At Fürth in West Germany, Kate Schmidt of the U.S. set a new world record for the women's javelin throw at 227 feet, 5 inches (69.32 metres), breaking the record of 226'9" set by Ruth Fuchs of East Germany.
- Born:
  - Ludacris (stage name for Christopher Bridges); American rap artist and film actor; in Champaign, Illinois
  - Jonny Buckland, English-born Welsh guitarist for the band Coldplay; in London

== September 12, 1977 (Monday) ==
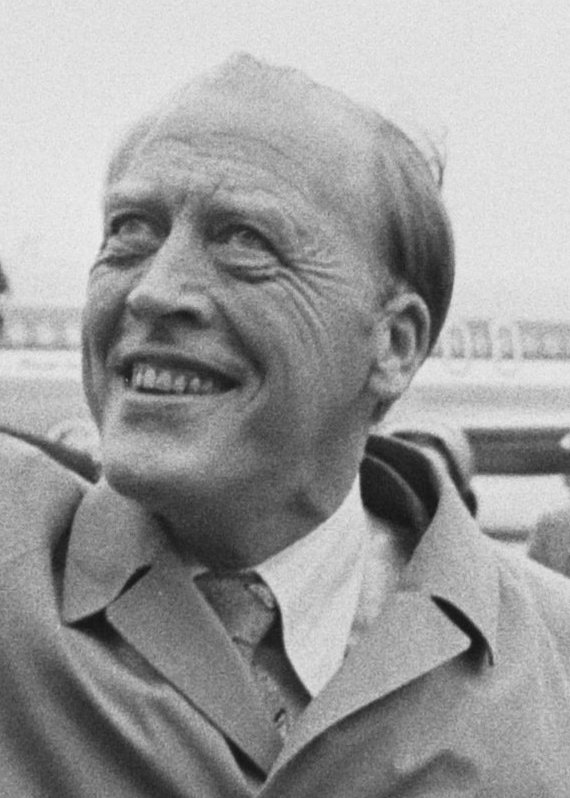
Norway's Prime Minister Nordli

- Two days of voting in Norway for all 155 seats of the Storting, with the Arbeidarpartiet (Labor Party) of Prime Minister Odvar Nordli posting a 14-seat gain to win 76 seats, two short of a majority.
- In a breakthrough in the Ogaden War that had started in northeastern Africa on July 13, the Somali National Army won the Battle of Jijiga after fighting with the Ethiopian Army within 12 days after invading Ethiopia's region of the Somali minority.
- Born:
  - 2 Chainz (stage name for Tauheed Epps), American rap artist; in College Park, Georgia
  - James McCartney, British-born American singer and songwriter, as the son of Paul McCartney and Linda McCartney; in London
- Died:
  - Steve Biko, 30, South African anti-apartheid activist, died of a brain hemorrhage five days after being beaten by police at an interrogation at Port Elizabeth. On December 2, after a three-week public inquest into Biko's death, South African magistrate Marthinus J. Prins ruled that although "Mr. Biko's death could be attributed to head injury with extensive brain injuries followed by complications leading to renal failure," and "the head injury was probably sustained... when the deceased was involved in a struggle with members of the security branch... The available evidence does not provee that the death of Mr. Biko was brought about by any act or omission involving an offense by any person."
  - Robert Lowell, 60, American poet, Pulitzer Prize and National Book Award winner, died of a heart attack while riding in a New York taxicab.

== September 13, 1977 (Tuesday) ==
- The Italian-built Orbital Test Satellite (OTS 1), intended to be the first orbiting spacecraft of the European Space Agency, was launched from the U.S. at Cape Canaveral at 6:31 in the morning (11:31 UTC) on a U.S. Delta 3000 rocket. Only 54 seconds after liftoff, however, the rocket exploded when a crack in one of the booster rockets ignited the rocket's main fuel tank, destroying the $42 million OTS 1 satellite.

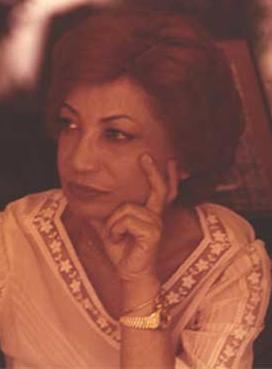
Princess Ashraf of Iran

- An attempt was made to assassinate Princess Ashraf Pahlavi, the older twin sister of the Shah of Iran while she was being chauffeured through the French Riviera resort city of Antibes. A pair of assassins had stolen a Peugeot sedan from a car dealer, then used the car to block the Rolls-Royce automobile in which Princess Ashraf was riding. The princess was riding in the front seat of the car, while Kahainouri Forough, the princess's lady-in-waiting, had been sitting in the back, was killed after apparently being mistaken for the monarch's sister. Princess Ashraf escaped injury, and chauffeur Arus Ettemadian was slightly wounded.
- The controversial U.S. television situation comedy Soap debuted on the ABC television network as a late night parody of daytime soap operas. Of the 195 ABC affiliate stations, 18 refused to air the season opener. The program was a success and would run for four seasons with 85 episodes.
- Born: Fiona Apple (stage name for Fiona Apple McAfee-Maggart), American singer; in New York City
- Died: Leopold Stokowski, 95, British-born Marican conductor for the Philadelphia Orchestra

== September 14, 1977 (Wednesday) ==
- In Colombia, the National Civil Strike (Paro Cívico Nacional de 1977) broke out as a protest against President Alfonso López Michelsen, with rioting and skirmishes between protesters and riot police throughout the capital, Bogotá, and then spread to other Colombian cities. Almost 3,000 people were injured and 33 were killed. Thousands of people were arrested and detained in the Plaza de Toros de Santa Maria bullfighting ring and the El Campin soccer football stadium. The violence subsided the next day.
- All 20 people on a U.S. Air Force Boeing EC-135 (a modified Boeing 707) were killed when the jet crashed on takeoff from Kirtland Air Force Base near Albuquerque, New Mexico on a Higher-Headquarters Directed (HHD) mission for the USAF Tactical Air Command. Lacking sufficient power to climb, the jet crashed at an altitude of 8,500 feet (2,600 m) in the Manzano Mountains. The report of the U.S. Air Force accident investigation concluded that "a plane too heavy and a runway too short combined with miscalculations by the crew" in causing the crash near a nuclear weapons storage facility.
- U.S. terrorist Mark Rudd, one of the founders of the Weather Underground paramilitary organization, turned himself in to authorities after more than seven years as a fugitive. A month later, Rudd was allowed to plead to a misdemeanor on charges of inciting student rioting in 1968 at Columbia University, and was set free.

== September 15, 1977 (Thursday) ==
- Optical fiber was first used to carry live telephone traffic, as an Italian company in Turin, Centro Studi e Laboratori Telecomunicazioni (CSELT), began operation of two telephone exchanges.
- The U.S. TV police drama "CHiPs" made its debut on the NBC television network, featuring Larry Wilcox and Erik Estrada as motorcycle officers of the California Highway Patrol, and Robert Pine as their supervisor. Created by Rick Rosner and produced by Paul Playdon, "CHiPs" was the program was the only one of the new shows of the 1977-78 U.S. TV season that would last for more than two seasons. In all, it would run for six seasons and 139 episodes.
- Born:
  - Tom Hardy, English film actor; in Hammersmith, London
  - Chimamanda Ngozi Adichie, Nigerian novelist; in Enugu
  - Angela Aki (stage name for Kiyomi Angera Aki), Japanese pop singer; in Itano, Tokushima prefecture
  - Jason Terry, American NBA basketball point guard; in Seattle

== September 16, 1977 (Friday) ==
- At the University of Zurich Hospital in Switzerland, Dr. Andreas Gruentzig, a German cardiologist, performed the first percutaneous coronary angioplasty (also called a "balloon angioplasty") on a human being as a non-surgical procedure, improving on the work of Dr. Charles Dotter by fitting a catheter "with a polyvinylchloride balloon that would set in motion a revolution in medicine." Adolph Bachman, a heart patient at the hospital, agreed to be the first patient and remained awake during the entire procedure for clearing a coronary artery.
- A treaty for the Gabčíkovo–Nagymaros Dams project was signed in Budapest between Prime Ministers György Lázár of the People's Republic of Hungary and Lubomír Štrougal of the Czechoslovak Socialist Republic to build dams on the Danube River to control flooding and provide hydroelectric power for both nations. The project soon ran into problems with funding and, after the breakup of Czechoslovakia in 1993, a border dispute between the Republic of Hungary and the Slovak Republic over the rerouting of the Danube, the border between the two nations.
- Former Prime Minister Zulfiqar Ali Bhutto of Pakistan was re-arrested only three days after he had been released on bail from his September 3 arrest. He would remain incarcerated at the Central Jail Rawalpindi for the rest of his life, found guilty of murder on March 18, 1978, after a five-month long trial, and hanged in prison on April 4, 1979.
- American serial killer Carlton Gary, who had escaped prison on August 22, committed the first of at least seven rape/murders of aged women, strangling Ferne Jackson, 60, at her home in Columbus, Georgia. Before his arrest 15 months later, he would strangle seven other women ranging in age from 61 to 89 years old. He would be executed by lethal injection in 2018. "
- Soviet Russian serial killer Anatoly Biryukov committed the first murder of five babies in Moscow, before being arrested on October 24, 1977. He would be executed by a gunshot to the head on February 24, 1979.
- Died:
  - Maria Callas (stage name for Maria Kalogeropoulos), 53, U.S.-born Greek soprano opera singer, died of a heart attack.
  - Marc Bolan (born Mark Feld), 29, English rock-guitarist and lead vocalist for the band T. Rex, was killed in a car wreck in London while being driven home by his girlfriend.
  - Claudio Camaso (stage name for Claudio Volonté), 38, Italian film actor, hanged himself at the Regina Coeli prison in Rome, six weeks after being arrested for the fatal stabbing of film gaffer Vincenzo Mazza.

== September 17, 1977 (Saturday) ==
- The inaugural Tournament of Champions of the U.S. World Championship Tennis professional circuit was won by Harold Solomon of the U.S. over Ken Rosewall of Australia, at Madison Square Garden in New York City.
- Italian astronomer Andrea Boattini discovered the first of hundreds of minor planets that he would locate, two days before his eighth birthday, when he and his mentor Giuseppe Forti found

== September 18, 1977 (Sunday) ==
- Courageous (U.S.), skippered by Ted Turner, swept the Australian challenger Australia in four meets to win the America's Cup yacht race at Newport, Rhode Island.
- Born: Kieran West, British rower, in Kingston upon Thames
- Died: Paul Bernays, 88, British-born Swiss mathematician known for the Hilbert–Bernays paradox and for the von Neumann–Bernays–Gödel set theory

== September 19, 1977 (Monday) ==
- Vice Premier Deng Xiaoping of the People's Republic of China proposed the idea of the Boluan Fanzheng (撥亂反正 or "out of chaos, bring order") at a meeting with Liu Xiyao, Yong Wentao and Li Qi, senior officials of China's Ministry of Education, the reversal of the damage done during the 11 years of the Cultural Revolution.
- Under pressure from the Carter Administration, Nicaragua's Anastasio Somoza Debayle lifted the state of siege in the Central American nation.
- Agents of North Korea kidnapped a 52-year-old man, Yutaka Kume, from the Ushitsu beach near Noto in Japan's Ishikawa Prefecture, beginning a series of at least 17 North Korean abductions of Japanese citizens.
- Died:
  - Larisa Popugayeva, 54, Soviet geologist known for her 1954 discovery of the deposits of diamonds in Zarnitsa, based on the finding of kimberlite, died of an aortic rupture.
  - Borys Martos, 98, Ukrainian politician who had briefly served as the premier of the Ukrainian People's Republic in 1919 before fleeing the Soviet Union.

== September 20, 1977 (Tuesday) ==
- The Petrozavodsk phenomenon, a series of initially unidentifiable objects in the sky, was observed over the Russian city of Petrozavodsk in the Soviet Union and some northern European countries. The event came at the same time as the launch of the Soviet electronic intelligence satellite Kosmos 955.
- The phrase "jumping the shark", referring to the point where a creative work has reached the point of running out of new ideas, was given inspiration in an episode of the highest-rated TV program in the U.S. at the time, Happy Days.
- Born: Namie Amuro, Japanese singer and actress; in Naha, Okinawa Prefecture

== September 21, 1977 (Wednesday) ==
- The crash of Malev Hungarian Airlines Flight 203 killed all 8 of its crew and 21 of the 45 passengers on board. The Tupolev Tu-134 jet had departed Istanbul in Turkey and was preparing to land at Bucharest in Romania as a stop on the way to Budapest in Hungary. An investigation by the Romanian Department of Transportation concluded that the jet had gradually lost altitude and failed to clear a plateau during its approach to the runway.
- Bert Lance, the Director of the U.S. Office of Management and Budget for President Jimmy Carter, resigned after being investigated for mismanagement of a bank in Calhoun, Georgia. Lance would later be acquitted of the criminal charges brought against him.
- Motorcycle stunt rider Evel Knievel let anger end his career when he used a baseball bat to attack and injure sports promoter Shelly Saltman. Knievel was furious after reading Saltman's recently published Evel Knievel on Tour, an unflattering book about Knievel's 1974 attempt to jump a rocket-powered cycle over the Snake River Canyon in Idaho. Saltman was hospitalized for a compound fracture of his left arm and a broken right wrist. On October 14, Knievel pleaded guilty to assault with a deadly weapon and was sentenced to six months in jail and lost all of his sponsors and endorsement deals, including his contract with the Ideal Toy Company, which had paid him royalties for using his likeness in a line of best-selling Evel Knievel action figures and related merchandise.

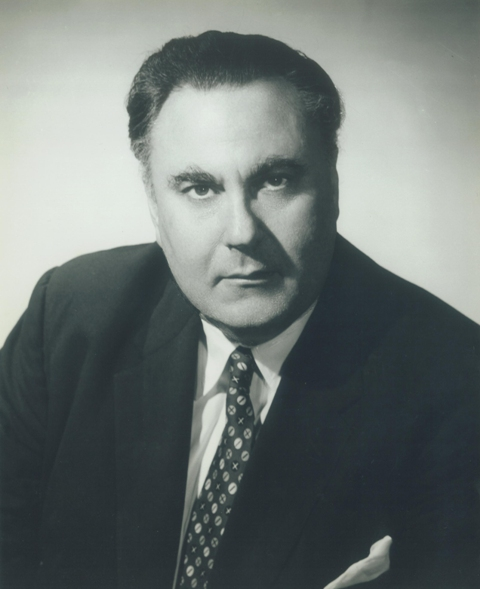
Adler

- Born: Natalia Gavrilița, Prime Minister of Moldova 2021 to 2023; in Malayeshty, Moldavian SSR, Soviet Union
- Died: Kurt Adler, 70, Austrian-born U.S. conductor of the Metropolitan Opera in New York from 1943 to 1973

== September 22, 1977 (Thursday) ==
- Egypt's Foreign Minister Ismail Fahmy announced a major reverse in his nation's policy toward Israel, telling reporters at a press conference in Washington DC that "The Arab countries are ready for the first time to accept Israel as a Middle Eastern country to live in peace in this area, in secure borders." Fahmy's announcement came after he had concluded a day of talks with U.S. President Carter and Secretary of State Cyrus Vance.
- A group of 55 people— 31 American citizens and 24 of their Cuban relatives— landed at Homestead Air Force Base near Miami in the U.S. after a short flight from Havana in Cuba, becoming the first persons allowed to leave Cuba in more than a decade. The group arrived on a chartered Eastern Air Lines Boeing 727 jet, as part of a repatriation agreement between Cuba and the United States.
- Haiti's dictator Jean-Claude Duvalier marked the 20th anniversary of the Duvalier family's rule over the Caribbean nation and freed 104 political prisoners, "some of them jailed for many years and others thought dead."
- What is now the USA Network on cable television was launched as a joint venture of UA-Columbia Cablevision and the Madison Square Garden Corporation, and would soon brand itself the Madison Square Garden Sports Network, unrelated to what is now the MSG Network. When MSG Network assumed its current name on April 9, 1980, the MSG Sports Network would rebrand itself as the USA Network.
- The HBO (Home Box Office) pay cable service, which had been limited since 1972 to broadcasting sporting events and uninterrupted telecasts of recent cinema films, launched its first original weekly program, Inside the NFL, which has gone on to become cable television's longest-running series.
- Regular commercial service to and from New York City by the Concorde supersonic aircraft began after the New York and New Jersey Port Authority relented on its position against allowing the Concorde to land at the JFK Airport.
- Born: Paul Sculthorpe, English rugby league forward with 27 appearances for the Great Britain national team; in Burnley, Lancashire

== September 23, 1977 (Friday) ==
- At a trade show in Tokyo, the All-Japan Audio Fair, the first public demonstration of what was billed as "laser sound" by the Japanese electronic company Sony and the Dutch company Philips was given for the technology that would become the basis for digital recording of the compact disc for music, as well as the videodisc, the CD-ROM, the DVD and other products. The Associated Press reported that "The Japanese have introduced a record player that uses a laser beam instead of a needle and does not wear out records... A small laser gun on the turntable cast a beam on a 12-inch wide silvery disc rotating 1,800 times a minute. Characteristics of the disk's 54,000 delicate grooves are turned into electrical signals and then into sound that is reproduced through speakers."
- In Uganda, six political prisoners escaped prison before they were to be executed for a failed attempt on June 18 to overthrow dictator Idi Amin. The coup organizer, Major Patrick Kimumwe, got out of a prison cell of the State Research Bureau in the Nakasero district of Kampala. Kimumwe was accompanied by Flight Lieutenants Sylvester Mutumba and Boswal Nambale, Cadet Nicodemus Kassujja, and Warrant Officer Eddie Sendaula, after were able to force their way out through a ventilator in the wall of their prison cell at the . Two other prisoners, Warrant Officers John Okech and Christopher Ssekalo, were not thin enough to get through the space and remained behind after helping the others.
- In the last horse race of the day at Belmont Park, a horse from Uruguay named Lebón, with 57—1 odds, won in an upset. The win was suspect because Lebón had finished 11th out of 12 in a previous race at Belmont, and had earned only $711 in 1976. Equine veterinarian Mark Gerard, who collected $77,920 by betting on the horse, was soon found to have substituted another horse, Cinzano, in place of Lebón. Soon afterward, a Uruguayan sports journalist recognized Cinzano and informed the New York State Racing Commission.
- Born: Suzanne Tamim, Lebanese singer; in Beirut (murdered 2008)

== September 24, 1977 (Saturday) ==
- The collision of a ferryboat and a barge on the Nile River, north of Cairo, killed 51 of the 60 people on board. Nine passengers survived, but 26 bodies were recovered and 25 other passengers were missing and presumed dead.
- The championship of Australian rules football, the 80th Grand Final of the Victorian Football League, was played at Melbourne before a crowd of 108,224 people and a live television audience on the Seven Network. The North Melbourne Kangaroos scored 10 goals (worth six points each) and 16 behinds (one point each) (10.16) while the Collingwood Magpies had 9 goals and 22 behinds (9.22), giving each team exactly 76 points. A second, 81st Grand Final was played on October 1, with North Melbourne beating Collingwood, 21.25 to 19.10 (151 to 124).
- Died: Sherm Lollar, 53, American baseball player, 3-time Gold Glove Award winner as a catcher, later an assistant MLB team coach, died of cancer.

== September 25, 1977 (Sunday) ==
- The Khmer Rouge, the army for Democratic Kampuchea (the name at the time for Cambodia) crossed into Vietnam during Vietnam's Mid-Autumn Festival and killed 592 Vietnamese civilians as it invaded the Tây Ninh province at Xincheng. The massacre is still commemorated in Vietnam.
- Elections were held for the 295-seats of the French Senate 106 to 189. The moderate and conservative Union centriste coalition, led by Senate President Alain Poher, retained control with 189 seats, despite losing some seats to leftist parties.
- Rhodesia's Prime Minister Ian Smith met secretly with President Kenneth Kaunda of neighboring Zambia, in order to discuss a British and American proposal for a transition from Rhodesia's white minority government to black African rule. Smith, Foreign Minister Pieter van der Byl, and another cabinet member, Jack Gaylard, flew to Lusaka, the capital of Zambia. The meeting was disclosed a week later.
- Dublin GAA defeated Armagh GAA to win the All-Ireland Championship of Gaelic football, 5–12 to 3-6 (equivalent to 27 to 15, based on 3-point goals for kicks past the goalkeeper under the crossbar, and 1 point apiece for kicks over the crossbar). Dublin GAA, the 1976 winner, retained the Sam Maguire Cup in the game played before 66,542 fans at Croke Park in Dublin.
- The Chicago Marathon, now one of the six World Marathon Majors (at Tokyo, Boston, London, Berlin, Chicago and New York), was run for the first time under the name "The Mayor Daley Marathon".
- Born:
  - Divya Dutta, Indian film actress, 2018 National Film Award winner for Best Supporting Actress for the Bollywood drama Irada; in Ludhiana, Punjab state
  - Clea DuVall, American film actress; in Los Angeles
  - Joel David Moore, American film and TV actor; in Portland, Oregon

== September 26, 1977 (Monday) ==
- Taking advantage of deregulation of the U.S. airlines, the British carrier Laker Airways inauguration the lowest trans-Atlantic passenger flight service in the world, with flights between Gatwick Airport in London to John F. Kennedy Airport in New York. The prices were $135 (£77.14) one-way from New York to London and £59 ($103.25) from London to New York, based on the then-exchange rate of £1.00 = $1.75.
- U.S. white supremacist Robert Edward Chambliss was arrested on charges of conspiracy and murder in the deaths of four African-American girls, 14 years after the 16th Street Baptist Church bombing in 1963 in Birmingham, Alabama. Alabama's attorney general, Bill Baxley, had reopened the case in 1976 and a grand jury returned the indictment against Chambliss.
- Died: Ernie Lombardi, 69, American baseball player and inductee in the National Baseball Hall of Fame, 1938 National League Most Valuable Player, NL batting champion 1938 and 1942

== September 27, 1977 (Tuesday) ==
- Japan Air Lines Flight 715 crashed into a hillside during its approach to Kuala Lumpur in Malaysia, after having departed from Hong Kong, killing 34 of the 79 people on board, including 8 of its 10-member crew. The McDonnell Douglas DC-8 jet had gone below the minimal descent altitude of 750 feet (230 m) before the captain had sighted the runway and crashed into the 300 feet (91 m) high hill, four nautical miles from the runway.

== September 28, 1977 (Wednesday) ==
- Japan Air Lines Flight 472, flying from Paris to Tokyo, was hijacked by five members of the Japanese Red Army (JRA) terrorist group. The Douglas DC-8 had 151 other passengers and crew on board and had just taken off from Mumbai when it was diverted to Dhaka in Bangladesh. Three days later, the Japanese government accepted the terrorists' demands and released nine members of the Red Army and paid a US$6,000,000 ransom. Announcing a decision of the Japanese government, Foreign Minister Sunao Sonoda told reporters, "There are times when one cannot speak about law and order," and announced acceptance of the demands. The last 19 hostages were freed by the Japanese Red Army on October 3 after the terrorists landed in Algiers.
- The Porsche 928 made its debut at the Geneva Motor Show.
- Born:
  - Pak Se-ri, South Korean professional golfer, winner of the Women's PGA Championship in 1998, 2002 and 2006; in Yuseong
  - Kristal Tin, Hong Kong singer and TV actress; in Hong Kong

== September 29, 1977 (Thursday) ==
- The Salyut 6 space station was launched into orbit by a Proton rocket from Baikonur Cosmodrome in the Soviet Union at 12:50 p.m. local time (0650 UTC) and would remain in orbit for almost five years, hosting 16 different crews of cosmonauts.
- The launch of Intelsat IVA F-5 by the U.S. failed after a fire broke out in the engine of the Atlas-Centaur rocket shortly after liftoff, destroying the communications satellite, which had cost $49,400,000 to build.
- The government of Spain granted autonomy to the region of Catalonia, after 40 years of rule from Spain. Spain's Premier Adolfo Suarez appointed a former Catalonian prime minister, Josep Tarradellas as President of the Generalitat de Catalunya. Tarradellas had been the head of the government in exile for Catalonia since 1954.
- In India, the Shah Commission, chaired by former Chief Justice Jayantilal Chhotalal Shah, began hearing the first testimony from witnesses who were damaged during the two-year National Emergency proclaimed by Indira Gandhi when she was Prime Minister of India.
- The U.S. Food and Agriculture Act of 1977 was signed into law by U.S. President Jimmy Carter, increasing price supports for farm products and establishing a farmer-owned reserve for grain.
- Born: Thenjiwe (stage name for Thenjiwe Maphumulo Moseley), South African comedian and TV actress known for the program Judge Thenjiwe Khambule; in KwaMashu, Natal Province
- Died:
  - Clifford Roberts, 84, administrator of the Augusta National Golf Club and founder of the Masters Tournament, committed suicide after an illness of several months. Roberts traveled to a lake on the golf course near Augusta, Georgia, and shot himself.
  - Robert McKimson, 66, American animator and director for the Warner Bros. and DePatie-Freleng studios, died of a heart attack.

== September 30, 1977 (Friday) ==
- Members of the Bangladesh Army, stationed at the Bogra Cantonment, staged a mutiny that would lead to much larger uprising on October 2 and the eventual execution of 1,143 military personnel.
- The last of the ongoing Apollo Lunar Surface Experiments Package (ALSEP) instruments on the Moon were deactivated after funding for the project was eliminated from the budget at the end of Fiscal Year 1977. The Charged Particle Lunar Environment Experiment (CPLEE) had been placed at the Fra Mauro formation in 1971 by the crew of Apollo 14 to measure the energy spectra of low-energy charged particles striking the lunar surface.
- Philippine political activists Serge Osmeña and Eugenio Lopez Jr., jailed for the past five years under the martial law declared in 1972 by President Ferdinand Marcos, escaped from the Philippine Army's maximum security prison at Fort Bonifacio. The incident would later be dramatized in the 1995 film Eskapo.
- The Mutual Broadcasting System, one of the four major U.S. radio networks, was acquired by the Amway Corporation, a company known for its manufacture and private distribution network for health, beauty and home care products.
- At Hanoi, Vietnamese government officials met with a team from the United States and returned the remains of 17 U.S. Air Force fliers, three from the U.S. Navy, and those of a civilian government employee, all of whom had been missing in action during the Vietnam War. The U.S. Military Center was able to identify the individuals. At the time, 702 other persons were listed as MIAs and 1,803 were classified as killed in action but whose bodies had never been recovered.
- Born:
  - Sun Jihai, Chinese footballer with 80 appearances for the China national team; in Zhuanghe, Liaoning province
  - Roy Carroll, Northern Irish footballer with 45 appearances as goalkeeper for the Northern Ireland national team; in Enniskillen, County Fermanagh
- Died: Mary Ford, 53, American pop music singer and part of the husband-wife duo of Les Paul and Mary Ford, died of pneumonia after having been in a diabetic coma for 54 days. On August 8, she had had an adverse reaction to insulin and never regained consciousness. During the first five years of the 1950s, they had 16 top-10 hits.
