= October 1977 =

Month of 1977

<<	October 1977					>>
Su	Mo	Tu	We	Th	Fr	Sa
						1
2	3	4	5	6	7	8
9	10	11	12	13	14	15
16	17	18	19	20	21	22
23	24	25	26	27	28	29
30	31

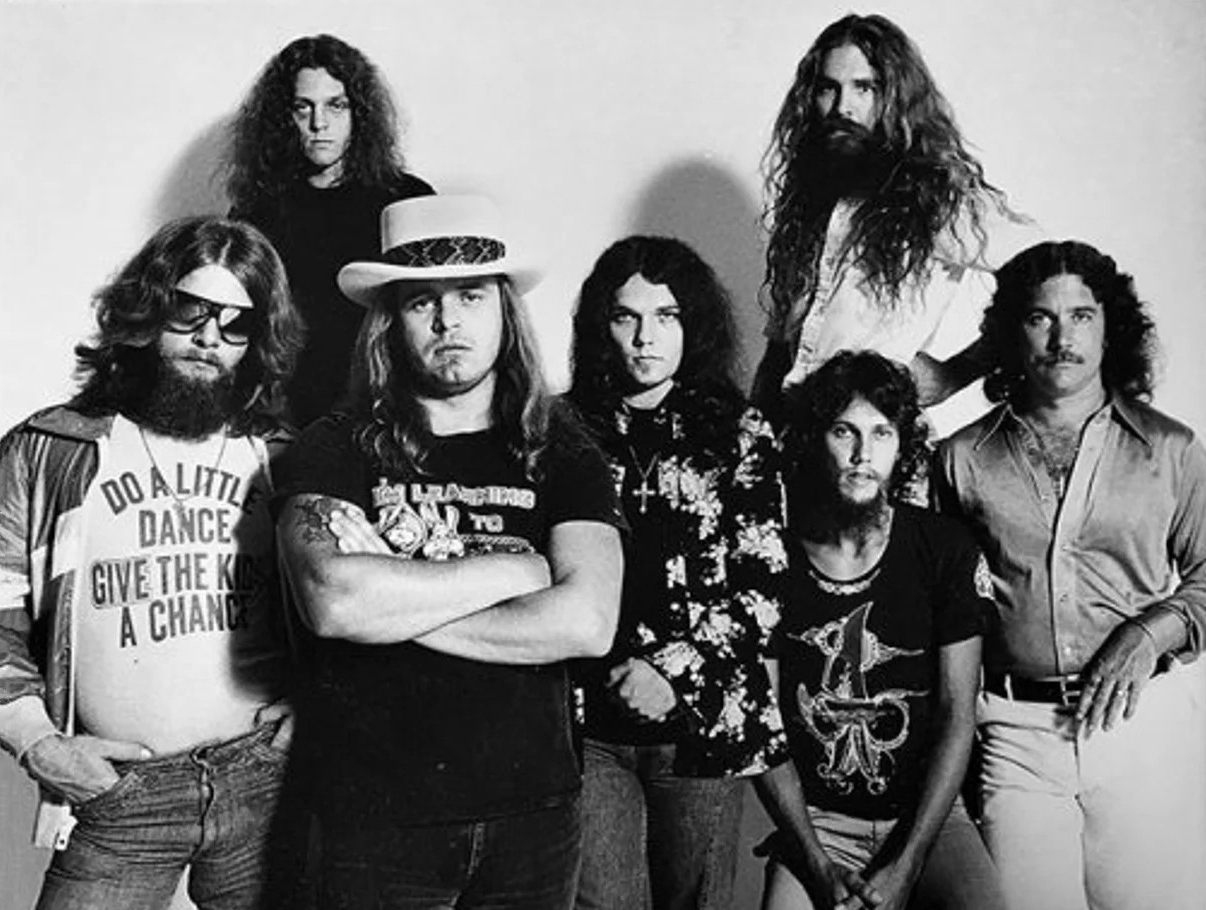
October 20, 1977: Plane crash kills six on flight carrying Lynyrd Synyrd rock band to concert

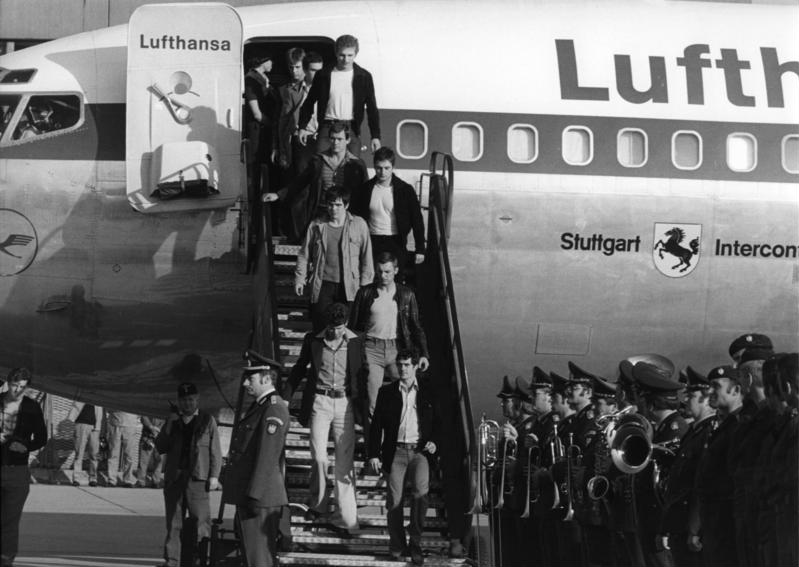
October 18, 1977: Lufthansa 181 passengers freed after being rescued from hijackers by Germany's GSG 9 commandosteam

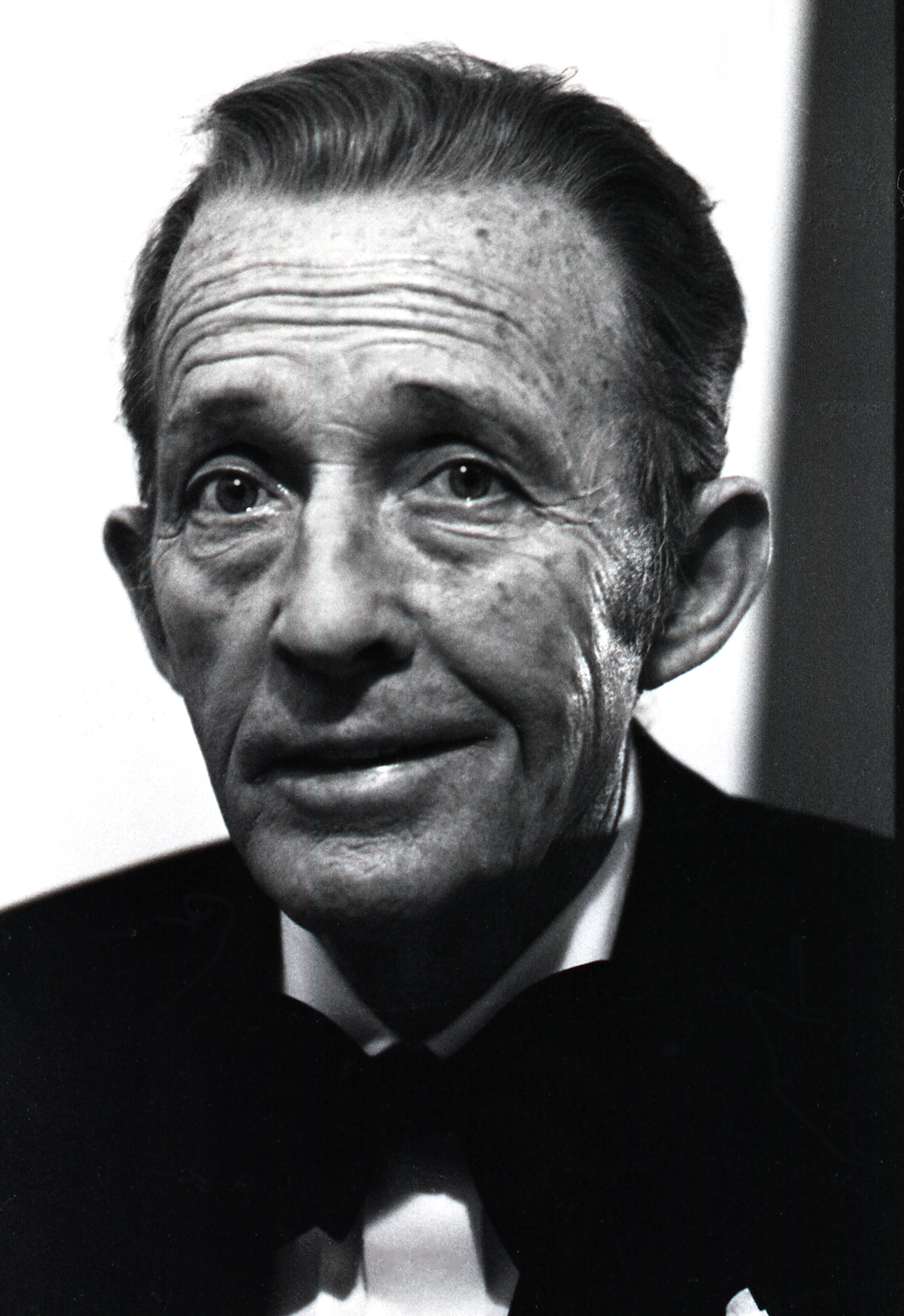
October 14, 1977: Popular singer and film star Bing Crosby dies on golf course

The following events occurred in October 1977:

== October 1, 1977 (Saturday) ==
- Pelé (Edson Arantes do Nascimento), the Brazilian professional footballer who would be named Athlete of the Century by the International Olympic Committee at the end of the 20th century, played his final game after popularizing soccer football in the United States, a friendly exhibition televised throughout the world. Pelé played the first half of the game for the New York Cosmos, the U.S. team where he had completed his professional career, and the second half for the team where he had started, Santos FC.
- The United States and the Soviet Union jointly released a communiqué announcing their agreement regarding the Middle East and the requirements for peace between the Arab nations and Israel. The approved statement said in part that "The United States and the Soviet Union believe that… all specific questions of the settlement should be resolved, including such key issues as withdrawal of Israeli Armed Forces from territories occupied in the 1967 conflict; the resolution of the Palestinian question, including insuring the legitimate rights of the Palestinian people; termination of the state of war and establishment of normal peaceful relations on the basis of mutual recognition of the principles of sovereignty, territorial integrity, and political independence."
- Pakistan's leader Zia ul-Haq announced that he was indefinitely postponing parliamentary elections that had been scheduled for October 18, and decreed a halt to all further political activity. After taking power in a July 5 coup d'etat, General Zia had promised that elections for a new civilian government would be held as soon as possible. Elections would not be held again until 1985.
- The United States Department of Energy began operations, with former U.S. Defense Secretary James Schlesinger serving as the first U.S. Secretary of Energy, began operations at the James V. Forrestal Building in Washington, D.C., after having been authorized on August 4, 1977. The new cabinet-level department consolidated the Federal Energy Administration, the Energy Research and Development Administration, the Federal Power Commission, and programs of various other agencies.
- Born: Claudia Palacios, Colombian journalist and TV news anchor; in Cali

== October 2, 1977 (Sunday) ==
- According to a reporter for ESPN, the "high five" celebration in sports was originated, or at least was given its widest attention up to then, by Glenn Burke, an outfielder for baseball's Los Angeles Dodgers and Dusty Baker. The two were celebrating Baker's game-winning home run that gave the Dodgers the National League West title on the last day of the regular season. As Jon Mooallem would describe it, "Burke, waiting on deck, thrust his hand enthusiastically over his head to greet his friend at the plate. Baker, not knowing what to do, smacked it." Baker told historians later, "His hand was up in the air, and he was arching way back... So I reached up and hit his hand. It seemed like the thing to do."
- A mutiny of members of the Bangladesh Air Force and the Signal Corps of the Bangladesh Army was started by a signal from Signal Corps officer Sheikh Abdul Latif, followed by the takeover by 700 soldiers and airmen of the Central Ordnance Depot in Dhaka at 2:40 in the morning. By 5:00 a.m., the depot was looted of its weapons and the government radio station was taken over. By 8:00 a.m., however, the mutiny was suppressed, and a roundup of participants began. Before the end of the year, over 1,000 troops and airmen would be executed.
- Tomás Ó Fiaich was consecrated as the Archbishop of Armagh, the spiritual leader of Roman Catholics in the Irish Republic and in Northern Ireland.
- Born: Didier Défago, Swiss alpine ski racer, 2010 Olympic gold medalist in the downhill race; in Morgins, Canton of Valais
- Died: Odd Frantzen, 64, Norwegian footballer with 20 games for the Norway national team (including the 1938 World Cup tournament), was kicked to death during a home invasion by two robbers.

== October 3, 1977 (Monday) ==
- Indira Gandhi, the former Prime Minister of India, was arrested at her home in Delhi after Charan Singh, the Minister of Home Affairs, secured a criminal indictment against her for misuse of government-owned property. At her arraignment, magistrate Ripu Dayal dismissed the charges unconditionally, citing insufficient evidence, and released her.
- Died: Tay Garnett (William Taylor Gaarnett), 83, American film director known for The Postman Always Rings Twice, Mrs. Parkington and The Valley of Decision

== October 4, 1977 (Tuesday) ==
- The military government of Peru, led by General Francisco Morales Bermudez, announced that the first national elections since 1966 would take place in the South American nation on June 18, with voting for the 100-member Constituent Assembly.
- The Soviet Union announced its Interkosmos program that would allow people from other nations to join Soviet cosmonauts in being launched into space, with a news bulletin in the Communist Polish Workers Party newspaper Trybuna Ludu. On March 2, 1978, Vladimir Remek of Czechoslovakia would become the first space traveler from a place other than the U.S. or the USSR.
- Born:
  - Muhammad Ali Mirza, Pakistani Islamic scholar; in Jhelum, Punjab province
  - Najat Vallaud-Belkacem, Moroccan-born French politician, French Minister of National Education, 2014 to 2017; in Bni Chiker, Morocco
  - Matthias Fekl, German-born French Minister of the Interior who served for two months in 2017; in Frankfurt, West Germany
  - Bowie Jane (stage name for Miranda Ball), Australian DJ, singer, producer, lawyer and contestant on Big Brother Season 25
- Died: Seelawathie Gopallawa, First Lady of Sri Lanka since 1972 as wife of President William Gopallawa

== October 5, 1977 (Wednesday) ==
- In Spain, an autonomous regional government was established in the area of Catalonia, comprising the provinces of Barcelona, Gerona, Tarragona and Lérida.

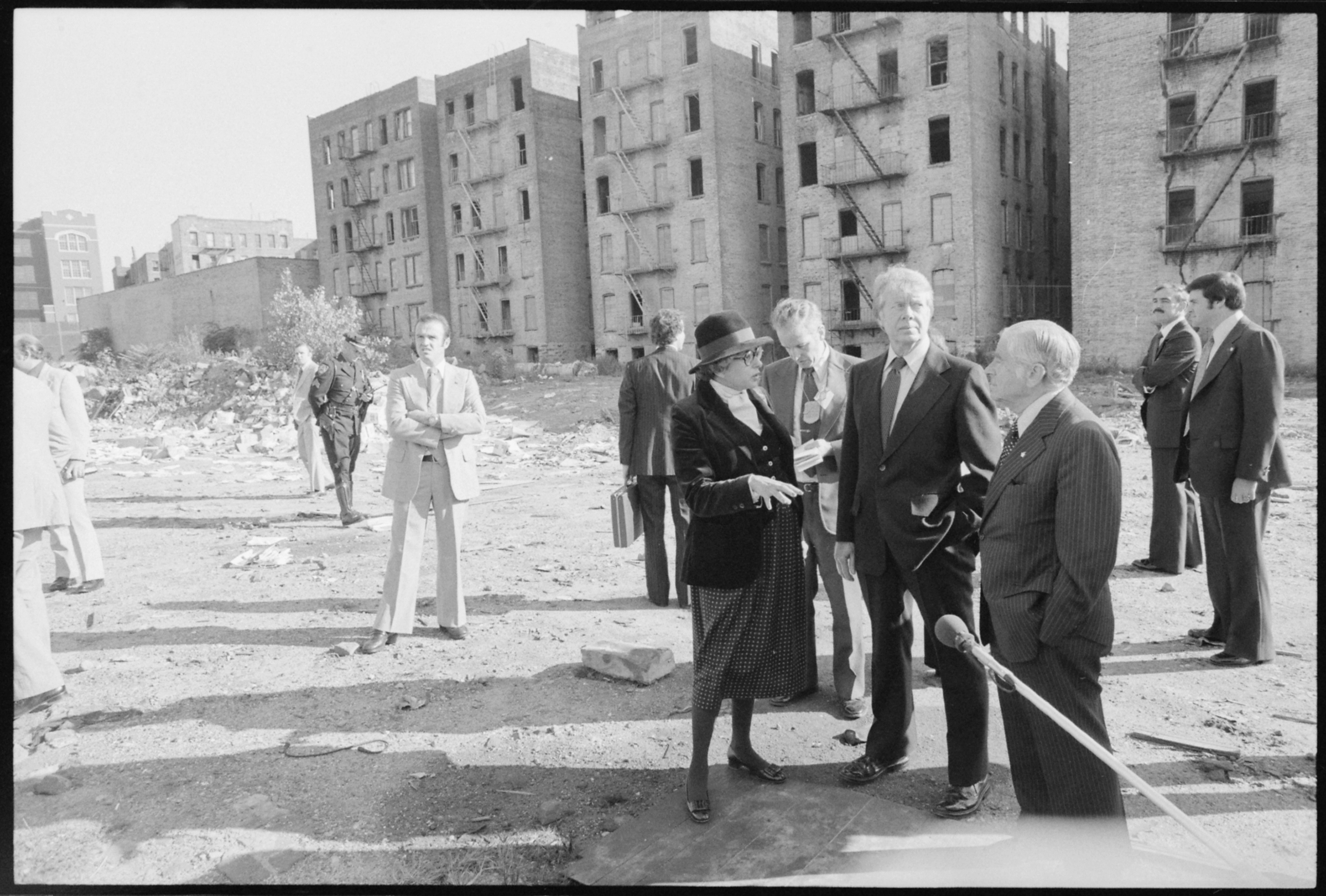
October 5, 1977: HUD Secretary Patricia Roberts Harris, President Carter and New York City Mayor Abraham Beame in the South Bronx

- U.S. President Jimmy Carter visited the South Bronx in New York City and, after observing the decay on Charlotte Street, declared the area to be "the worst neighborhood in the United States."
- Yasuhiko Okudera became the first Japanese footballer to play in a European major league, making his debut for the West German Bundesliga team 1. FC Köln.
- Born: Man Maneewan, Thai folk singer known for his hits singing Luk thung music; in Phibun Mangsahan district
- Died:
  - Seamus Costello, Irish activist and leader of the paramilitary Irish Republican Socialist Party, was shot to death while sitting in his parked car in Dublin.
  - Jan Garber, 82, American musician and big band leader, as well as a radio personality, known for the NBC Radio Network program, The Jan Garber Orchestra.

== October 6, 1977 (Thursday) ==
- The Mikoyan MiG-29, a Soviet jet fighter, made its first flight, after being designed as a match for the U.S. F-15 and F-16 aircraft.
- Died: Danny Greene, 43, Irish-American mobster, was killed by a car bomb after going to a dental appointment in Lyndhurst, Ohio. A bomb had been placed in the car next to Greene's automobile and was remotely detonated.

== October 7, 1977 (Friday) ==
- The Soviet Union adopted its third Constitution. In the same session, both houses of the Supreme Soviet, the USSR's official parliament, approved Vasily Kuznetsov as First Vice President of the Presidium (a post created in the new constitution), serving as assistant to Communist Party Secretary Leonid Brezhnev in Brezhnev's capacity as President of the Presidium. Kuznetsov had lived in the United States in the 1930s as a student at Carnegie Institute of Technology in Pittsburgh, and later as an employee of the Ford Motor Company in Detroit.
- The People's Republic of China announced that China and the Soviet Union reached an agreement in the city of Heiho on navigation of two rivers that separated the two Communist nations, the Amur (referred to in China as the Heilung river) and the Ussuri.
- Marvin Mandel, Governor of the U.S. state of Maryland, became the first U.S. governor since 1924 to be sentenced to prison for a federal crime, and was sentenced to four years in a federal prison. Mandel, found guilty on August 23 of mail fraud and racketeering, was suspended from office immediately after sentencing, and acting governor Blair Lee took over full duty.

== October 8, 1977 (Saturday) ==
- Three terrorists of the Basque separatist group ETA assassinated the government-appointed Mayor of Guernica, Augusto Unceta Barrenechea, as well as his two bodyguards, after Unceta arrived to play at a jai alai court.
- In the first State of Origin game to be played in Australian rules football. Although the Victorian Football League (VFL) had more of the best Australian players than the West Australian Football League (WAFL), the agreement between the VFL and WAFL provided for interstate games to be waged based on where a player had grown up rather than where the player lived at the time of the game. Under the format, the Western Australian team had VFL and WAFL players who had started their careers in Western Australia, while the Victoria team roster was limited to players whose state of origin was Victoria. In the first State of Origin game, Western Australia defeated Victoria 151 to 57 (23.13 to 8.9). An earlier game (on June 25) between WAFL stars against VFL stars had seen Victoria defeat Western Australia, 154 to 91 (23.16 to 13.13).
- Born: Anne-Caroline Chausson, French BMX rider, 2008 Olympic gold medalist in the Women's BMX; in Dijon, Côte-d'Or département
- Died: Joe Greenstein, 84, Polish-born American strongman and entertainer

== October 9, 1977 (Sunday) ==
- In Bangladesh, a mass execution was carried on military personnel accused in an October 2 mutiny. Starting at midnight, death sentences were carried out at the Dhaka Central Jail against prisoners accused of treason, with execution by hanging or by firing squad. Over the next two months, a total of 1,143 Army and Air Force personnel were put to death.
- The Soyuz 25 space mission was launched from the Soviet Union with Cosmonauts Vladimir Kovalyonok and Valery Ryumin, with the goal of being the first spacecraft to dock with the Salyut 6 space station. After five attempts to engage the Salyut's docking latches, Kovalyonok and Ryumin ended the mission on October 11.
- Herb Lusk, a running back for the Philadelphia Eagles, scored a touchdown in an NFL game against the New York Giants, then knelt in the end zone and gave a prayer of thanks, becoming the first NFL player to give a prayer after scoring and setting a habit picked up by other players since then.
- The first championship game of Australia's National Soccer League, was played at Brisbane in Queensland for the NSL Cup. Brisbane City FC and the Marconi Stallions from the Sydney suburb of Fairfield, New South Wales, played to a 1—1 draw, after Brisbane scored the tying goal in the 60th minute.
- Died: Ruth Elder, 74, pioneering female aviator who flew 2,623 miles (4,221 km) across the Atlantic Ocean on October 11, 1927, in an attempt to match the feat of Charles Lindbergh, died almost exactly 50 years after the accomplishment.

== October 10, 1977 (Monday) ==
- In the Philippines, an attack by the separatist Moro National Liberation Front killed 35 officers and soldiers of the Philippine Army, including Brigadier General Teodulfo Bautista, the Adjutant General of the Armed Forces of the Philippines. General Bautista had been lured by the Moro leader, Usman Sali, to the public square in the city of Patikul on the pretext of peace negotiations, when Bautista's group was ambushed.
- A riot by 2,000 people, confined in Mexico's Jalisco state penitentiary in Guadalajara, left 14 inmates dead. Afterward, hundreds of prisoners signed a statement saying that the persons killed had been informers.
- Jubiläum, an orchestral composition by German composer Karlheinz Stockhausen, had its premiere at the Hannover Opera House in West Germany. Stockhausen had been commissioned to create an original work for the Operatic Festival, the 125th anniversary of the founding of the Hannover Opera.
- Born: Amir Karara, Egyptian film and TV actor and star of the suspense drama Kalabsh; in Cairo
- Died:
  - Ivan Lavsky, 58, Soviet Russian painter
  - Jean Duvieusart, 77, Prime Minister of Belgium in 1950, President of the European Parliament 1964 to 1965
  - Angelo Muscat, 47, Maltese-born British character actor, died of pneumonia.

== October 11, 1977 (Tuesday) ==
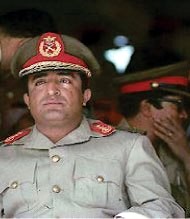
North Yemen President al-Hamdi

- The president of the Yemen Arab Republic (North Yemen), Lieutenant-Colonel Ibrahim al-Hamdi, was assassinated in San'a, two days before he was scheduled to visit the People's Democratic Republic of Yemen (South Yemen) to discuss reunification of the two nations. A three-member council, headed by the Yemeni armed forces Chief of Staff, Lieutenant Colonel Ahmed al-Ghashimi, replaced Hamadi, who had been killed along with his brother Abdullah.
- The Treaty of Osimo, signed on November 10, 1975, between Italy and Yugoslavia, went into effect and divided the former Free Territory of Trieste between the two countries. The area to the west of the Adriatic Sea went to Italy as the Province of Trieste, and the larger portion to the east became part of Yugoslavia, and would be divided again between the republics of Slovenia and Croatia.
- Mato Grosso do Sul was created as the 22nd state of Brazil, from the southern portion of the existing state of Mato Grosso. With a capital at Campo Grande, Mato Grosso do Sul would gain full statehood on January 1, 1979, and Harry Amorim Costa as its first governor.
- Born:
  - Matt Bomer, American TV actor known for being the star of White Collar, Golden Globe award winner for The Normal Heart; in Webster Groves, Missouri
  - Laura Gallego García, Spanish author of juvenile fiction; in Quart de Poblet, Valencia
- Died:
  - Beatriz Allende, 35, Chilean socialist politician and daughter of the late President Salvador Allende, committed suicide at Havana while in exile in Cuba.
  - MacKinlay Kantor, 73, American novelist and Civil War historian, known for his 1956 bestseller and Pulitzer Prize winning book Andersonville

== October 12, 1977 (Wednesday) ==
- Brazil's Minister of the Army, General Sylvio Frota, was fired by President Ernesto Geisel after General Frota announced that he intended to run for president against Geisel in the 1978 presidential election.
- The U.S. Community Reinvestment Act, to encourage investment in low-income housing, was signed into law by President Carter.
- Thirty people in India were drowned when the bus in which they were riding ran off the road near the city of Chandigarh in the state of Punjab and fell into a canal of the Bhakra Dam.
- The Empire State Building in New York City began the practice of using different colored floodlighting of a building to celebrate special occasions, with a system devised and installed by Douglas Leigh. The skyscraper, at one time the tallest in the world, was illuminated in blue and white to celebrate the victory of the New York Yankees in the World Series.
- Born:
  - Bode Miller, American alpine ski racer, 2010 Olympic gold medalist, winner of world championships in 2003 and 2005; in Easton, New Hampshire
  - Bashar Abdullah, Kuwaiti footballer with 134 caps and 75 goals for the Kuwait national team; in Kuwait City
- Died:
  - Dorothy Davenport, 82, American film producer and actress, known for her crusade against drug abuse in the 1920s after the death of her husband Wallace Reid; she was the writer, producer and star of the anti-drug film Human Wreckage.
  - Germaine Bailac, 96, French mezzo-soprano opera singer for the Paris Opera

== October 13, 1977 (Thursday) ==
- Lufthansa Flight 181 was hijacked by four members of the Popular Front for the Liberation of Palestine after taking off from the Spanish resort of Palma de Mallorca on a flight to Frankfurt, bringing vacationers back to West Germany. At 2:30 p.m., the four hijackers invaded the cabin and forced the pilot to divert the flight to Rome for refueling. The PFLP demanded the release of 11 imprisoned members of West Germany's Red Army Faction terrorist group. From Rome, the Boeing 737 stopped at Larnaca on the island of Cyprus, where a representative of the Palestine Liberation Organization attempted to get the hijackers to release the passengers and crew. After departing Larnaca, the jet took off and attempted to land at Beirut, Damascus, and Baghdad.
- Benjamin Fortes, a 59-year-old accountant in South Africa, became the first person to receive a donor heart from a chimpanzee. The surgery took place at the Groote Schuur Hospital in Cape Town and was performed by Dr. Christiaan Barnard, who had made the first human heart transplant in 1968. Dr. Barnard had transplanted a baboon heart into a human earlier in the year, but the patient died a few hours after the surgery. The chimpanzee heart was a supplement, rather than a replacement, to the patient's heart. Fortes lived for 82 hours after the operation.
- The career of world-famous motorcycle stunt rider Evel Knievel came to an end as Robert C. Knievel pleaded guilty to a September 21 assault of Shelly Saltman, a 20th Century Fox studio executive who had written an unflattering book about Knievel's 1974 attempt to jump over the Snake River Canyon. On November 14, Knievel was sentenced to 180 days incarceration at the Los Angeles County Jail, and lost all of his sponsors.
- Born:
  - Paul Pierce, U.S. pro basketball player, 2021 Hall of Fame inductee; in Oakland, California
  - Antonio Di Natale, Italian footballer with 42 caps for the Italy national team; in Naples
  - Kiele Sanchez, American TV actress known for The Glades; in Chicago
- Died: Harry Helson, 78, American psychologist who developed the Adaptation-Level Theory of judgment.

== October 14, 1977 (Friday) ==
- Running out of fuel, the hijacked Lufthansa Flight 181 landed at Bahrain at 1:52 in the morning after being denied permission to go to Baghdad and Kuwait. A spokesman for the hijackers demanded freedom for 13 West German terrorists and a ransom of $15,500,000, setting a deadline of noon local time on Sunday. On arrival, the Boeing 737 was surrounded by Bahrain Army troops. The hijackers' leader, Zohair Youssif Akache, told air traffic controllers that co-pilot Jürgen Vietor would be killed unless troops were withdrawn. The Bahraini troops pulled back and the refueled aircraft left at 3:24 for Dubai and landed at 5:40 and remained there for two days.
- Former U.S. Representative Richard T. Hanna, who had served in Congress for California from 1963 to 1974, became the first Congressman to be indicted on federal charges arising from the Koreagate scandal. Hanna was charged with 35 counts of mail fraud, two counts of bribery and one count of conspiracy. In 1978, Hanna would be found guilty and would be sentenced to one-year in prison.
- Died:
  - Bing Crosby (Harry Lillis Crosby), American singer, film star and golf sponsor, 74, died of a heart attack after playing 18 holes at the Golf La Moraleja course near in Spain.
  - Habiba Nur Ali, 6, became the last person in human history to die from smallpox, after contracting the disease in an epidemic in the Somalian village of Kurtunawarey.

== October 15, 1977 (Saturday) ==
- Two days of voting in the first multi-candidate elections in 12 years began in Zaire (now the Democratic Republic of the Congo). Although all candidates were required to be approved by the Mouvement Populaire de la Révolution (MPR), Zaire's only permitted political party, voters were given a choice of 2,080 office-seekers running for the 272 seats of the Legislative Council.
- The government of Spain promulgated the La Ley de Amnistia (The Law of Amnesty), Law 46/1977. The law went into effect two days later upon publication in the government's Boletín Oficial del Estado.
- Born: David Trezeguet, French footballer with 71 caps for the France national team; in Rouen, Seine-Maritime département
- Died:
  - Farida Arriany, 39, popular Indonesian film actress, died of complications following an appendectomy.
  - Florence Broadhurst, 78, Australian landscape artist and wallpaper entrepreneur, was beaten to death in her home in Paddington, New South Wales.

== October 16, 1977 (Sunday) ==
- After two days at Dubai, Lufthansa Flight 181 departed at 12:19 in the afternoon and was denied landing at Oman and Saudi Arabia before Jürgen Vietor made an emergency landing between the blockaded runways at Aden International Airport in South Yemen. The hijackers' leader, Zohair Akache, shot and killed pilot Jürgen Schumann, whose body was then thrown onto the tarmac at the Mogadishu airport after the jet landed. The aircraft remained on the ground until it was refueled early the next morning.
- Born: John Mayer, American pop singer, winner of 7 Grammy awards; in Bridgeport, Connecticut

== October 17, 1977 (Monday) ==
- The first of the Hillside Strangler killings was carried out in Los Angeles by cousins Kenneth Bianchi and Angelo Buono Jr. Yolanda Washington, the first of 12 victims, was abducted, raped, and strangled with a rope. Her nude body was cleaned up and dumped on a hillside near the Forest Lawn Cemetery on Ventura Highway. Six more women and three girls, ranging in age from 12 to 28, would be murdered in November, followed by one in December and a final victim in February.
- A team of 30 commandos from West Germany's GSG 9 (Grenzschutzgruppe 9) special ops team, commanded by Ulrich Wegener departed from Köln and landed at Mogadishu at 8:00 p.m. local time, then prepared to rescue the hostages of Lufthansa 181.
- Born: David "Dudu" Aouate, Israeli footballer and goalkeeper, with 78 caps for the Israel national team; in Nazareth Illit (now Nof HaGalil)
- Died:
  - Michael Balcon, 81, British film producer
  - Yusuf Banuri, 69, Pakistani Islamic scholar and educator, founder of the Jamia Uloom-ul-Islamia university

== October 18, 1977 (Tuesday) ==
- Troops of West Germany's GSG 9 special operations team stormed the hijacked Lufthansa passenger plane in Mogadishu in Somalia and killed three of the four hijackers but rescued the passengers and crew who had been held hostage for more than four days.
- Three members of the Baader-Meinhof Gang (who referred to themselves as the Red Army Faction) were found dead in their individual cells on the seventh floor of in West Germany's Stammheim Prison, in what police described as a simultaneous suicide in the wake of the failure of the Lufthansa hijacking. Gang-founder Andreas Baader and Jan-Carl Raspe both had gunshot wounds to the head, while Gudrun Ensslin hanged herself with the electric cord of a record player that she had been allowed in her cell. Baden-Wurttemberg's Justice Minister admitted that he could not explain how the men obtained guns, or how Ensslin was able to hang herself. The suicide attempt of Irmgard Möller, who stabbed herself with a butter knife, failed. Red Army supporters would claim that the prisoners were murdered, though a subsequent search of the prison "found spaces behind wall boards in the cells that contained batteries, wiring and other apparatus enabling Baader-Meinhof prisoners to communicate from cell to cell", and sufficient space behind boards in the Baader and Raspe cells to conceal a pistol. Upon learning of the deaths of Baader, Raspe and Ensslin, the Red Army Faction killed industrialist Hanns Martin Schleyer, who had been held hostage since his kidnapping on September 5.
- The Aztra massacre of more than 100 people took place in Ecuador at the Aztra Sugar Company mill, located in La Troncal. Local police fired into a crowd of 2,000 striking workers who were occupying the mill, after being called by Mayor Eduardo Diaz. Ecuador's government placed the number of dead at 16.

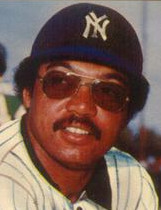
Jackson in 1977

- The New York Yankees defeated the visiting Los Angeles Dodgers, 8 to 4, to win baseball's World Series in Game 6, capturing the series 4 games to 2. The Yankees' Reggie Jackson hit three home runs, matching a record in a World Series game set by Babe Ruth for the Yankees on October 6, 1926 in Game 4 of the 1926 World Series. Only one other MLB player, Albert Pujols of the 2011 St. Louis Cardinals, has hit three homers in a World Series.
- The House of Commons of Canada began live television coverage of its proceedings.
- Born:
  - Giorgi Maskharashvili, Georgian film actor and director; in Tbilisi, Georgian SSR, Soviet Union
  - Paul Stalteri, Canadian soccer player with 84 caps for the Canada national soccer team, as well as 170 games in Germany's Bundesliga and 55 in England's Premier League; in Etobicoke, Ontario
  - Ryan Nelsen, New Zealand footballer with 49 caps for the New Zealand national team; in Christchurch
  - Peter Sohn, U.S. animator and voice actor for Pixar; in The Bronx, New York
  - Elisa Hansen and Lisa Hansen, twins who were conjoined at the brain. They would become the first to both survive surgery after a 16-hour surgery in 1979 and both would live until age 42.
- Died: Ray Ryan, U.S. multi-millionaire casino and resort owner, was murdered by a bomb that had been placed under his Lincoln Continental automobile in Evansville, Indiana.

== October 19, 1977 (Wednesday) ==
- Acting under section 10 of the Internal Security Act, the South African government made a nationwide roundup of 70 people associated with the anti-apartheid Black Consciousness Movement after declaring 19 organizations illegal.

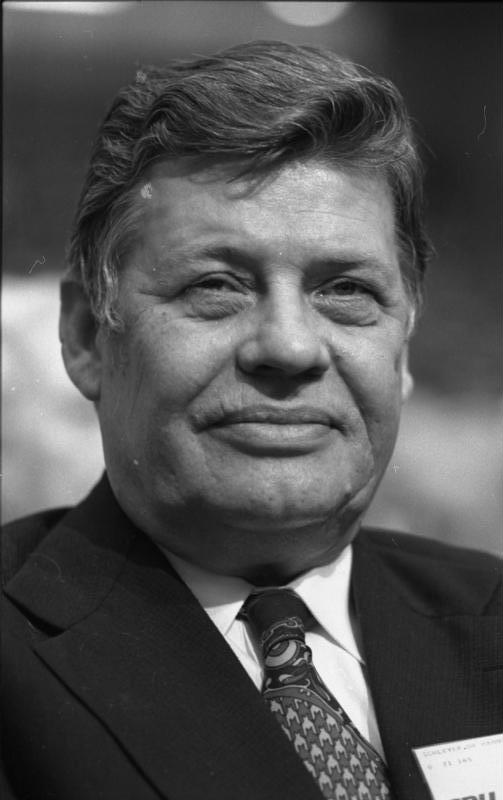
Hanns Martin Schleyer

- The day after the murder of kidnapped West German industrialist Hanns Martin Schleyer, his body was found in France in the trunk of an Audi 100 automobile that had been parked in Mulhouse. Red Army Faction member Silke Maier-Witt informed the Paris newspaper Libération that the car was parked on the Rue Charles Peguy in Mulhouse, and followed up with a phone call to the police in Frankfurt.

== October 20, 1977 (Thursday) ==
- Six people, including three members of the southern rock band Lynyrd Skynyrd, died in a charter plane crash outside Gillsburg, Mississippi. Killed also were pilot Walter McCreary, co-pilot William Gray, and the band's assistant road manager Dean Kilpatrick. The Convair CV-240 airplane was flying from the band's last concert, at Greenville, South Carolina, to a scheduled concert at Baton Rouge, Louisiana, when it ran out of fuel. The accident happened days after the October 17 release of their album Street Survivors.
- Thailand's Prime Minister Thanin Kraivichien was overthrown in a bloodless coup d'etat carried out by the Royal Thai Armed Forces and led by Army General Kriangsak Chamanan, who formed a new government on November 11.
- The parliament of the Republic of Sri Lanka enacted a law changing the system of government in the island nation to a parliamentary republic called the Democratic Socialist Republic of Sri Lanka, replacing the 168-member National State Assembly with the new Parliament of Sri Lanka, which would have 225 members elected. The change became effective upon the signing of the legislation by the Speaker of the Assembly, Anandatissa de Alwis.
- Born:
  - General Hun Manet, Prime Minister of Cambodia since 2023; in Memot, Democratic Kampuchea to General Hun Sen, who would later serve as Prime Minister from 1998 to 2023 before stepping down in favor of his son.
  - Sam Witwer, American television actor known as the star of Being Human; in Glenview, Illinois
  - Miguel Augusto Rodríguez, Venezuela TV actor; in Caracas
- Died:
  - Ronnie Van Zant, 29, lead vocalist for Lynyrd Skynyrd
  - Steve Gaines, 28, guitarist for Lynyrd Skynyrd
  - Cassie Gaines, 29, backup vocalist for Lynyrd Skynyrd, older sister of Steve Gaines

== October 21, 1977 (Friday) ==
- John Starkey, a New York state trial judge in Brooklyn, rejected claims by attorneys of mental disability for David Berkowitz, defendant in the "Son of Sam" murders, and found Berkowitz mentally competent to stand trial. After hearing almost two days of testimony, Judge Starkey commented in his ruling "Everyone agrees he understands the charges against him. Is he oriented in time and place? The answer is yes. Has he established a working relationship with his attorney? Again, yes. Therefore I find we are able to proceed."
- The crash in the Philippines of a U.S. CH-53D Sea Stallion helicopter killed 24 U.S. Marines and injured 14 others on Mindoro Island.
- The European Patent Institute was founded.
- Born: Chae Jung-an, South Korean actress, singer and philanthropist; in Busan

== October 22, 1977 (Saturday) ==
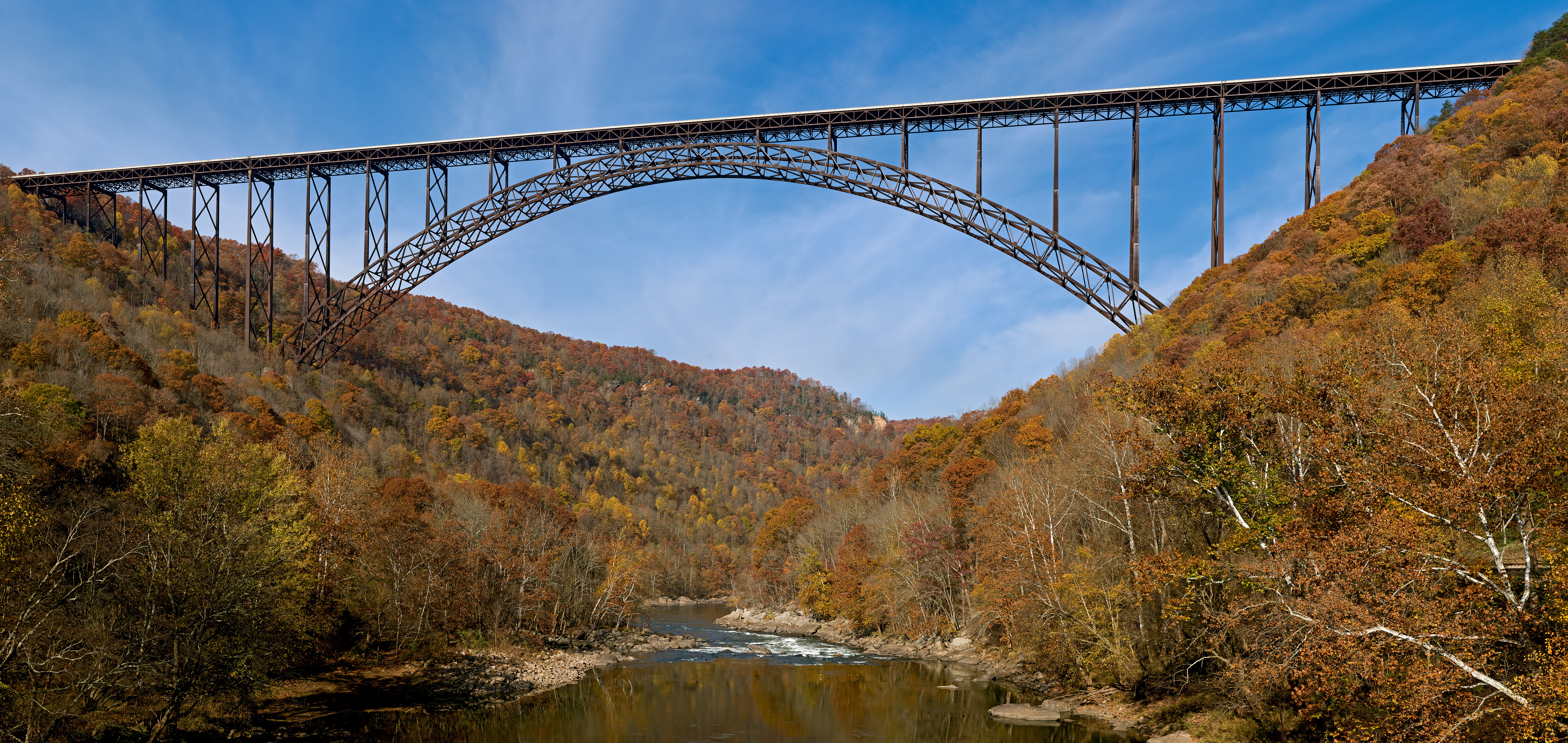
The New River Gorge Bridge

- What was, at the time, the world's longest single-span arch bridge opened in the U.S. state of West Virginia. The New River Gorge Bridge, near Fayetteville, is 3,030 feet (924 m) long and 876 feet (267 m) over the New River. The supporting arch is 1,700 feet (518 m) long.
- The magnetosphere measuring ISEE-1 and ISEE-2 satellites (officially, International Sun-Earth Explorer-A and -B) were launched on the same day from the United States.
- The Constitution of the Commonwealth of the Northern Mariana Islands was promulgated in a declaration signed by U.S. president Jimmy Carter.
- Born:
  - David Callaham, American screenwriter; in Fresno, California
  - Joju George, Indian film actor and producer of Malayalam cinema, known for Iratta; in Mala, Kerala
- Died: Shwe Pyi Aye, 68, Burmese musician and composer

== October 23, 1977 (Sunday) ==
- By a two-thirds margin, voters in Panama approved the two Panama Canal treaties signed with the United States.
- The president of Catalonia, Josep Tarradellas, returned to Barcelona after decades in exile and the autonomous government of Catalonia, the Generalitat, was restored in Spain.
- A fire swept through the Hotel Toledo in Chicago, a skid row hotel for where transient men and women were living. Seven people were killed and 14 injured after the two-story building went up in flames.

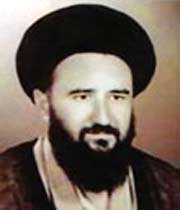
Mostafa Khomeini

- Died:
  - Mostafa Khomeini, 46, Iranian cleric, died while in the custody of police in Najaf. Memorial services for Mostafa Khomeini were organized in different cities in Iran by protesters who believed his death to be a murder by the SAVAK, the secret police of the Shah of Iran. Mostafa's father, the Ayatollah Khomeini, was in exile in France and did not return to Iran to attend the funeral, but would later describe the death as a "hidden favor of Allah" because it fueled discontent that led to the Islamic Revolution of 1979.
  - George Mardikian, 73, Turkish-born Armenian-American restaurateur and philanthropist
  - Lester Markel, 83, American journalist and Pulitzer Prize winner
  - Beatrice Nasmyth, 92, Canadian war correspondent

== October 24, 1977 (Monday) ==
- The United Nations General Assembly elected five new non-permanent members of the United Nations Security Council. Czechoslovakia. Kuwait. Bolivia and Gabon received the necessary two-thirds majority (at least 102 of the 146 votes) on the first ballot. After five ballots, Nigeria defeated Niger.
- The criminal trial of former Pakistani Prime Minister Zulfikar Ali Bhutto began before the High Court in Lahore, before a panel of five judges. After five months of evidence and deliberation, the High Court would find Bhutto guilty of murder on March 18 and sentence him to be executed, which would take place on April 4, 1979.
- In the U.S., Veterans Day was observed on the fourth Monday in October for the last time after having been moved to that date since 1971 by the Uniform Monday Holiday Act of 1968. The holiday was returned to November 11, the anniversary of the Armistice Day end of World War One, where it had been observed nationally from 1938 to 1970, with the day off on Monday if the holiday falls on Saturday or Sunday.
- The "Little Red-Haired Girl", referred to in the comic strip Peanuts for 20 years but never shown, was finally introduced to fans in a new Peanuts TV special, It's Your First Kiss, Charlie Brown, aired on CBS. In the show, her name was revealed to be "Heather".
- Born:
  - Rafael Furcal, Dominican MLB baseball player, 2000 National League Rookie of the Year; in Loma de Cabrera
  - David Callaham, American film screenwriter; in Fresno, California
- Died: Giuseppina Masotti Biggiogero, 83, Italian mathematician

== October 25, 1977 (Tuesday) ==
- A Palestinian gunman assassinated Saif Ghobash, an official with the Foreign Ministry of the United Arab Emirates, as Ghobash was walking through the Abu Dhabi International Airport, and had apparently been mistaken by the gunman for the Foreign Minister of Syria, Abdul Halim Khaddam.
- The existence of the Australian Secret Intelligence Service (ASIS) was confirmed by Australia's Prime Minister Malcolm Fraser, after the recommendation of the Royal Commission on Intelligence and Security, chaired by Commissioner Robert Hope. The ASIS had been established in 1952, and had remained unknown to the public until reporters for the Sydney newspaper The Daily Telegraph exposed it on November 1, 1972.
- Born: Birgit Prinz, German footballer with 214 caps for the Germany national women's team; in Frankfurt, West Germany
- Died:
  - Felix Gouin, 93, Prime Minister of France in 1946
  - Helen Badgley, 68, American silent film actress as "The Thanhouser Kidlet" in 103 films between the ages of 4 and 9.

== October 26, 1977 (Wednesday) ==
- The last natural smallpox case was discovered in Merca district, Somalia. The World Health Organization (WHO) and the Centers for Disease Control and Prevention (CDC) consider this date the anniversary of the eradication of smallpox, a great success of vaccination and, by extension, of modern science.
- The first successful test of a "killer satellite" was made by the Soviet Union, as Kosmos 961 intercepted Kosmos 959, which had been put into orbit five days earlier. The interceptor came close enough that destruction would have been possible, although no actual damage took place. Both satellites were subsequently de-orbited.
- Sir Keith Holyoake took office as the Governor-general of New Zealand, succeeding Sir Denis Blundell. Holyoake had served as Prime Minister from 1960 to 1972.

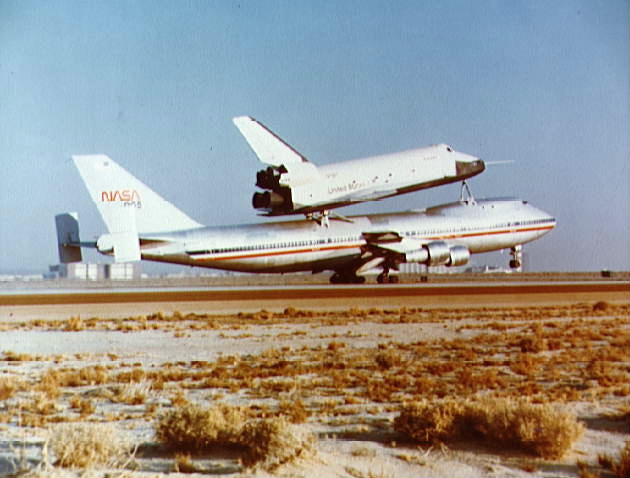
October 26, 1977: Enterprise prior to takeoff

- The last taxi flight of Space Shuttle Enterprise took place over California.
- Born:
  - Jon Heder, American film actor best known as the star of Napoleon Dynamite; in Fort Collins, Colorado
  - Myne Whitman (pen name for Nkem Okotcha), Nigerian writer of romance novels; in Enugu
  - Louis Crayton, Liberian footballer with 36 caps for the Liberia national team; in Monrovia
- Died: Ibrahim Jalees, 53, Pakistani journalist, publisher and book author, died after a short illness.

== October 27, 1977 (Thursday) ==
- The U.S. House of Representatives voted, 342 to 44, to have its proceedings televised live for the first time in the body's history."Televised Sessions Approved by House", Los Angeles Times, October 28, 1977, p. I-2
- By presidential decree, the Philippine city of Pitogo, on the island of Bohol, was officially renamed "President Carlos P. Garcia" in honor of the man who served as president of the republic from 1957 to 1961.
- Born:
  - Kumar Sangakkara, Sri Lankan cricketer, former captain of the Sri Lanka national cricket team, player in 134 Test matches and 404 One-Day Internationals; in Matale, Central Province
  - Vasundhara Das, Indian singer and actress; in Bangalore, Karnataka state
  - K8 Hardy (pen name for Kate Hardy), American painter and sculptor; in Fort Worth, Texas
  - Chingiz Aidarbekov, former Minister of Foreign Affairs of Kyrgyzstan from 2018 to 2020; in Frunze, Kirghiz SSR, Soviet Union (now Frunze, Kyrgyzstan)
- Died:
  - Tony Hulman, 76, U.S. businessman and owner of the Indianapolis Motor Speedway, credited for reviving the Indianapolis 500 race after World War II, died during surgery for a ruptured aortic aneurysm.
  - James M. Cain, 85, American novelist known for two books made into films, Mildred Pierce, The Postman Always Rings Twice as well as the short novel Double Indemnity
  - Therese Benedek, 84, Hungarian-born American psychoanalyst
  - Miguel Mihura, 72, Spanish playwright
  - Ted Hinton, 73, U.S. businessman and former deputy sheriff, and the last surviving member the Dallas County, Texas Sheriff's Department to participate in the ambush of Bonnie and Clyde on May 23, 1934.

== October 28, 1977 (Friday) ==
- The British punk band Sex Pistols released its first, and only record album, Never Mind the Bollocks, Here's the Sex Pistols on the Virgin Records label. Despite refusal by major retailers in the UK to stock it, the album entered the UK Album Charts at number one the week after its release. It would be released in the U.S. by Warner Bros. Records on November 11.
- On the same day, EMI Records released the Queen album News of the World in the UK (on EMI Records) and in the U.S. (on Elektra Records). The album featured two of the signature songs of the British rock group, "We Will Rock You" and "We Are the Champions".
- Born: Jonas Rasmussen, Danish badminton player, 2003 world champion in the men's doubles; in Aarhus
- Died: Bruno Streckenbach, 75, Nazi German SS official who headed the administration department of the Reich Security Main Office who was awaiting trial on an indictment for war crimes, died of heart disease.

== October 29, 1977 (Saturday) ==
- A group of four hijackers seized control of Vietnam Airlines Flight 509, a DC-3 airliner carrying 30 other passengers and a crew of six, shortly after the plane departed Saigon (Ho Chi Minh City) on a flight to Phu Quoc Island. Flight engineer Tran Dinh Nguyen and radio operator Nguyen Duc Hoa were shot to death, and a male flight attendant was stabbed. The plane landed at U-Tapao International Airport in Thailand for refueling, but the hijackers were refused asylum. Afterward, the DC-3 was permitted to land at Seletar Airport in Singapore, where the hijackers, led by Lam Van Tu, surrendered. While Singapore refused an extradition request from Vietnam, it tried all four hijackers for various crimes and sentenced each of them to 14 years in prison, with Lam Van Tu also receiving a caning of 12 strokes.
- Born: Brendan Fehr, Canadian film and TV actor known for Roswell; in New Westminster, British Columbia

== October 30, 1977 (Sunday) ==
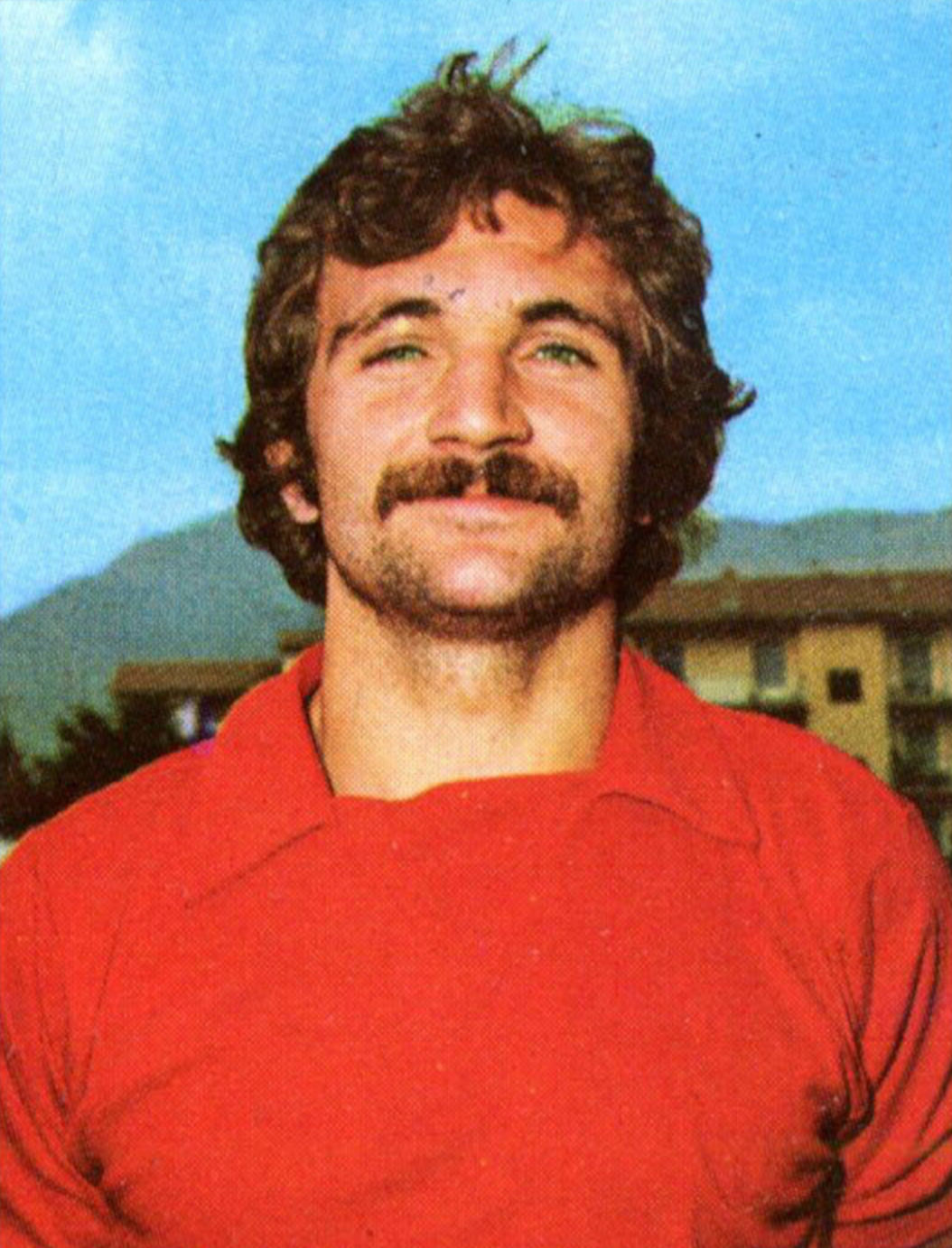
Renato Curi in 1975

- A soccer football game in Italy's Serie A, the top professional league there, was played at Perugia between second place (3-2-0) Juventus FC and third place (3-1-1) Perugia Calcio, when Perugia midfielder Renato Curi collapsed on the field and died during the 51st minute of the game. Curi, only 24 years old, was the first on-field fatality in Italian football. The match ended in a 0 to 0 draw.
- The record for fastest flight by an airplane around the world was broken after 12 years as a Pan American World Airways 747, carrying 150 passengers and crew, landed in the U.S. San Francisco, 54 hours and seven minutes after having departed from there on Friday. The 747 covered 26,000 miles (42,000 km), flying from San Francisco and flying over the North Pole to London (UK), followed by landings in Cape Town (South Africa) and Auckland (New Zealand). The previous record of 62 hours, 27 minutes, had been set in 1965 by a Boeing 707. Pan Am had commissioned the flight to celebrate its 50th anniversary.
- Died: Joseph Zerilli, 79, Italian-born American mobster who controlled the Detroit Partnership of organized crime, died of natural causes.

== October 31, 1977 (Monday) ==
- A United Nations Security Council vote to impose an embargo against trade and arms shipments was vetoed by three of the five permanent members (the U.S., Britain and France) after being approved 10 to 5 overall. To earlier attempts to reach a compromise resolution had been vetoed as well.
- The James Bay and Northern Quebec Agreement, described as "the first major, modern treaty with Canadian people" went into effect, providing for payment of C$255,000,000 (USD $229,000,000) over 20 years to 6,500 Cree and 4,200 Inuit Canadians living in northern Quebec, in return for the surrender of aboriginal rights to their 379,000 square miles (980,000 km^{2}) aboriginal territory, constituting almost 60 percent of the land in the province of Quebec. The Cree and Inuit were also granted exclusive hunting, fishing and trapping rights in large tracts of land, and ownership of small parcels of land.
- Voting was held for the 39 seats of Parliament in the South American nation of Surinam, for the first time since the nation had become independent. The National Party Coalition of Prime Minister Henck Arron won 22 seats, and the United Democratic Party coalition won the other 17.
- Raman Osman retired as the ceremonial governor-general of Mauritius after almost five years of service, although the head of the Mauritius government remained Seewoosagur Ramgoolam. The Chief Judge of Mauritius, Henry Garrioch took Osman's place.
- A group of 200 people, who were occupying buildings illegally on west London's Freston Road and facing eviction, announced that they were ceding from the United Kingdom, and declared the Free and Independent Republic of Frestonia to call attention to their plight. The problem would finally be solved in 1982 with the building of a housing project by the Notting Hill Housing Trust.
- Born: Debdeep Mukhopadhyay, Indian cryptographer security specialist; in Howrah, West Bengal
