= Kosmos 955 =

Soviet signals intelligence satellite

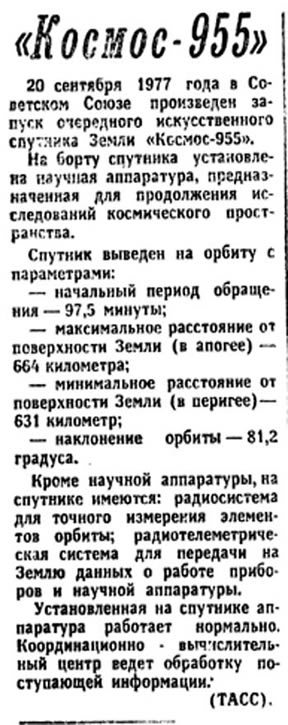
TASS report on the launch of Kosmos-955.

Kosmos 955 (Russian: Космос-955; International Designator: 1977-091A, satcat number 10362) was a Soviet ELINT satellite, launched from the Plesetsk Cosmodrome on September 20, 1977, at 01:01 UTC. The satellite's mass was 2,500 kg. Kosmos 955 had a periapsis of 631 km, apoapsis of 664 km, period inclination of 81.2° and an orbital eccentricity of 0.00235. It was launched by a Vostok-2M carrier rocket.

It decayed from orbit on 8 September 2000.

== Overview ==
The launch of Kosmos 955 has been suggested as the cause of the Petrozavodsk phenomenon.

According to the official report (pictured), the satellite contained scientific equipment for the "further exploration of outer space" as well as tools for making exact measurements of its orbital parameters. Also, the satellite was capable of self-observation of its own systems and devices. However, no public data or experiments have ever been returned and it is presumed that it was a test of the military surveillance system, Tselina-D.
