= Felix Ziegel =

Soviet mathematician (1920–1988)

Felix Yurievich Ziegel
- Born: 20 March 1920; Moscow, Soviet Russia
- Died: 20 November 1988 (aged 68); Moscow, USSR
- Education: Moscow University
- Known for: 43 books on astronomy Soviet ufology pioneer
- Scientific career
- Fields: Astronomy, mathematics, cosmology

Felix Yurievich Ziegel (Russian: Феликс Юрьевич Зигель, 20 March 1920 – 20 November 1988) was a Soviet researcher, Doctor of Science and docent of Cosmology at the Moscow Aviation Institute, author of more than forty popular books on astronomy and space exploration, generally regarded as a founder of Russian ufology. Ziegel, the co-founder of the first officially approved Soviet UFO research group, became an overnight sensation when, on 10 November 1967, speaking on the Soviet central television, he made an extensive report on the UFO sightings registered in the USSR and encouraged viewers to send him and his colleagues first-hand accounts of their observations, which resulted in barrage of letters and reports. He died in November 1988, leaving 17 volumes of the unpublished research documents for his daughter to keep.

== Biography ==
=== Early years ===
Felix Ziegel was born in Moscow on 20 March 1920, to the lawyer Yury Konstantinovich Ziegel, a Russian-born ethnic German, and his wife, Nadezhda Platonovna. "I had been sentenced to death before I was even born," Felix Ziegel used to say later, referring to the extreme circumstances of his birth.

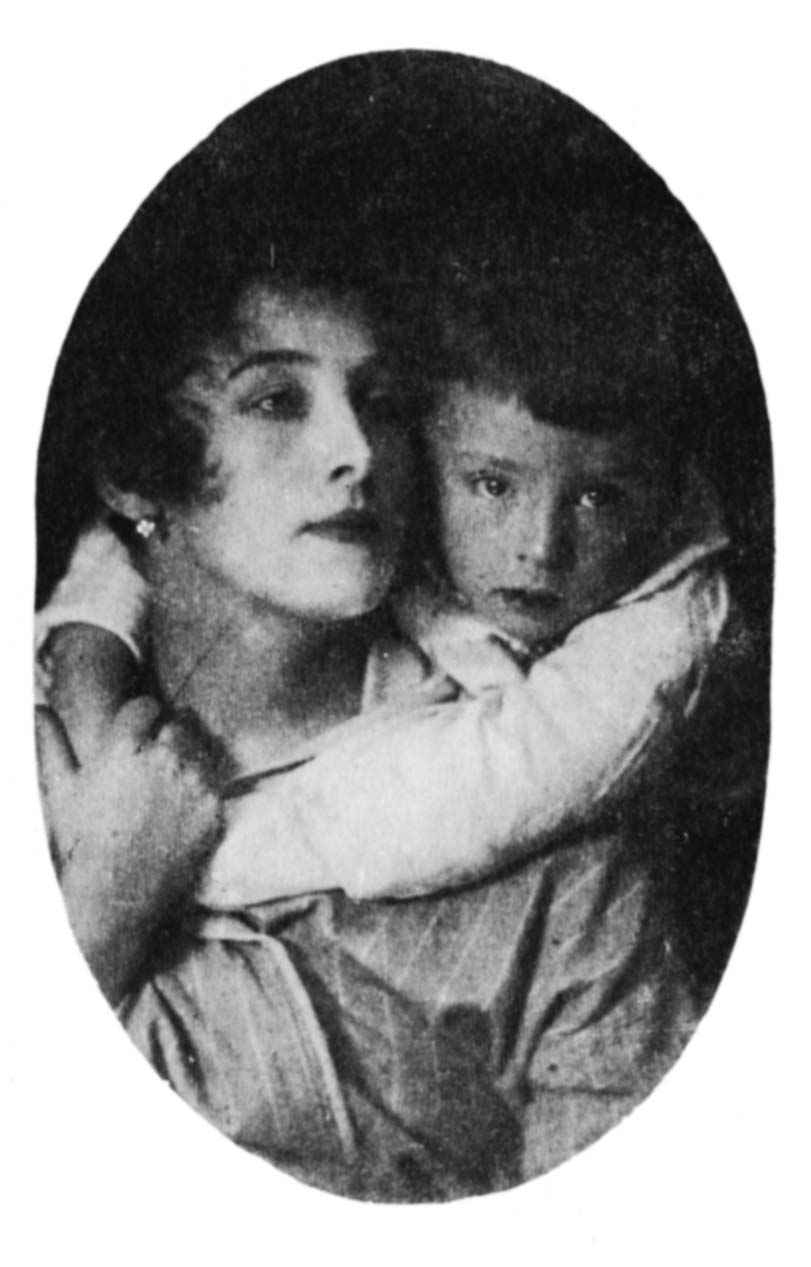
Nadezhda and Felix Ziegel. 1925

In March 1920, the 22-year-old student Nadezhda found herself on the Cheka's death row, waiting to be executed by firing squad for alleged "counter-revolutionary activities". According to her granddaughter Tatyana Konstantinova-Ziegel's memoirs, the sight of a "doomed young beauty in her last days of pregnancy" had such a disturbing effect upon a senior investigator officer that he promptly opened the door and let her go. One week after her miraculous release, Nadezhda gave birth to her son. The parents called him Felix, not after the Iron One, as some of the family's friends jovially suggested, but in honour of Prince Felix Yusupov, the man behind the Rasputin murder, whom the husband and wife hero-worshipped.

Felix Ziegel spent his early years at the family's countryside dacha in Tarusa where at the age of six he constructed a primitive telescope and started his first journal of astronomical observations. The post-1917 hardships notwithstanding, Yuri Ziegel gave his son a fine education, both technical and humanitarian. Young Felix, apart from being an astronomy enthusiast, showed deep interest in history, philosophy, Russian Orthodox Church architecture and theology. Influenced by his spiritual tutor Alexander Vvedensky, whose sermons he attended regularly in his teens, Felix considered for a while the career of a clergyman. The love for astronomy prevailed, and in 1938 he enrolled in the Moscow University's Mechanics and Mathematics faculty. Two years earlier the sixteen-year-old took part in his first scientific expedition; along with a team of senior scientists he traveled to Kazakhstan to observe the total eclipse of the Sun. It was there that Ziegel met a member of a US expedition camped nearside. The name of the American was Donald Howard Menzel, whose book several years later would change his life.

In 1939 Felix Ziegel, a second year student, was expelled from the university after the arrest of his father, who had been accused of plotting the destruction of a factory in Tambov. It soon transpired that the anonymous report had been compiled by a neighbour, whose idea was to move into the jailed man's flat. After two years spent in prison Yuri Ziegel was released, a physically and morally broken man. His leg had to be amputated as a consequence of the so-called zhuravl ("the Crane") torture, in which a prisoner was forced to stand on one leg during the interrogation.

==== Career ====
In 1941, as the Great Patriotic War broke out, Yuri Ziegel, an ethnic German, was deported to Alma-Ata with his family. Felix managed to return to the university which he graduated in 1945. The same year his first book "Eclipses of the Moon" was published. In 1948, after three years' work in the USSR Academy of Science he got his Candidate of Sciences degree in astronomy and started lecturing, mostly in Moscow's Geodesics and Cartography institute and The Planetarium. His most popular spoken-word shows were Life on Mars and Tunguska. The latter, based on Alexander Kazantsev's sci-fi short story "The Blast", had a soldier protagonist played by a professional actor, who was making a point to involve the audiences into the discussion as to the nature of the 1908 Tunguska event.

Felix Ziegel was the first in the USSR to come with the hypothesis for Tunguska blast having been the result of an alien spacecraft crash which, according to the author, had made a 600-kilometers-curve maneuver before exploding in the air. The concept jarred with the official "meteorite theory" but a decade later the evidence would be found, corroborating his idea that the object indeed went off in the air, without contacting the Earth. This latter discovery came as a result of numerous expeditions to the region made in the 1960s by enthusiasts who, in their own turn, have cited Ziegel's lectures as an original inspiration.

In 1963 Ziegel, now the co-author (with Valery Burdakov) of the first Soviet university textbook on the cosmonautics and space exploration became the astronomy docent in the Moscow Aviation Institute. The same year he read Donald Menzel's book Flying Saucers published in Russian which reignited his interest in possible contacts with the extraterrestrial life.

==== UFO studies ====
In May 1967 the first official Soviet UFO Study Group held its meeting at the Moscow Aviation and Cosmonautics Center with Major General Pyotr A. Stolyarov at the helm and Ziegel as his deputy. In October the DOSAAF Cosmonautics Committee invited the Group to function under its auspices. Preceding this was the publication of Ziegel's article in Smena magazine, in which he wrote:

These UFOs have been seen all over the USSR; the craft of every possible shape, small, large, flattened, spherical. They are able to remain stationary in the atmosphere or shoot along at 100,000 kilometers per hour. They move without producing the slightest sound, by creating around themselves a pneumatic vacuum that protects them from burning up in our stratosphere. Their craft have the mysterious capacity to vanish and reappear at will. Besides, they are able to affect our power resources, putting to a halt our electricity-generating plants, our radio stations, and our engines, without, however, leaving any permanent damage. So refined a technology can only be the fruit of an intelligence that is indeed far superior to ours.

The article caused furore in the USSR and was regarded in the West as the first ever evidence that the Soviets were aware of the UFO phenomena too.

By this time Ziegel has completed his chapter in the book called Naselyonny Kosmos (Inhabited Cosmos), which presented the data collected by the team of well-known Soviet scientists, as well numerous reports by the Russian pilots drawn from the Ministry of Civil Aviation archives. This ambitious research on the question of extraterrestrial intelligence was due to be released by the USSR Academy of Science's Nauka Publishing House in 1968. The project's Editor-in-chief was Boris Konstantinov, the academy's vice-president, academicians Vitaly Ginzburg, Anatoly Blagonravov and Vasily Parin were among the team of scientific reviewers.

On 10 November 1967 Stolyarov and Ziegel, speaking on the Central TV, encouraged viewers to send their first-hand accounts in. The response was astonishing: it showed, Ziegel later wrote, that the UFO phenomena was indeed widespread. But before the committee (by this time comprising more than 200 scientists and high-level professionals) could even begin to work on the information received, its work was abruptly cancelled. In the end of 1967 the Soviet Academy of Sciences' Physics department led by Lev Artsymovich, passed a resolution denouncing studying of UFOs as such. In February 1968 Ziegel made a report at a high-level discussion held in Moscow, academicians Leontovich, Mustel and Petrov attending. Several days later he received a letter from Edward Condon, the director of the University of Colorado UFO Project, suggesting that the Soviet and the American groups should cooperate, starting with the information exchange. Ziegel and twelve other members of his group signed a letter requesting the Soviet government to create the state-sponsored organization that should coordinate all the UFO research in the country. Next month he received the official response: it was negative.

The Inhabited Cosmos was already in print, when Boris Konstantinov suddenly died in July 1969. The academician Lev Artsimovich demanded the book to be confiscated and brought before the academician Vasily Fesenkov for further scrutiny. The resume signed by Artzymovich and Fesenkov, read: "Along with the articles based on strong scientific evidence we found there some pseudo-scientific scoops (UFOs, Tunguska meteorite, etc.) more akin to fables, which can in no way be published under the Academy's auspice".

Ziegel and Pekelis made an official protest. It was upheld by Parin, the almanac's new Editor-in-Chief, but rejected by Mikhail Millionshchikov, the academy's vice-president. The heavily censored 1972 edition, according to Argumenty i Fakty, "profoundly shook the readership" but there was not a single mention in it of either UFOs or the Tunguska event. "Our efforts to tell the truth about the UFO phenomena to a wide scientific community failed completely," Ziegel later admitted.

Felix Ziegel in Sharapova Ohota, Moscow region, 1977. The drawing, made according to the witnesses' reports depicts a UFO, allegedly seen at this very place

In the early 1973 Ivan F. Obraztsov, the Moscow Aviation Institute rector (and later the RSFSR Minister of Education) asked Ziegel for an update on "the current situation around the UFO issue." Much impressed with it, he upheld the idea of restarting the project, but later confessed he could give it only moral support. Ziegel called for the special meeting of the academy's Radioastronomy Council, inviting some well-known scientists like Vsevolod Troitsky and Nikolai Kardashev. His lecture made an impact: in a carefully worded resolution the Council proposed that the "data exchange process should be maintained" between the Council and the UFO investigators. Ziegel then formed the UFO Study Group at the MAI, compiled a report called "The Preliminary Study of Anomalies in the Earth's Atmosphere" and initiated the ambitious UFO-77 symposium.

In July 1976 one of Ziegel's (KGB-sanctioned, as he made a point to stress later) lectures, made in the secret Moscow Kulon factory, was published by the samizdat. Amateurishly shorthanded and full of mistakes, it contained some personal data, including the author's telephone numbers. What followed then were what Ziegel later referred to as his "days of nightmare." On 28 November 1976, sci-fi writer Yeremey Parnov published in Komsomolskaya Pravda an article entitled "The Technology of Myth-mongering", calling for "this whole UFO business to be sorted out," and labeling ufology "pseudoscience". Ziegel responded by "The Technology of Lies" article (which none of the central press wanted to publish) and made an unsuccessful attempt to sue Parnov for libel.

Ziegel's UFO Study group was disbanded and what he saw as "the libelous campaign aimed at the UFO studies as a whole," commenced. The MAI authorities formed two commissions aimed at "re-evaluating" Ziegel's work. While one of them found Ziegel's professional activities in the institute flawless, another took a deeper approach, involving studies of his family history, notably his parents' pre-1917 "behavior". According to this second commission's verdict, Ziegel's work was non-scientific and entirely "self-promotional", its motivation being "getting the West interested in his own persona." According to the two commissions' joint communiqué, Ziegel's mistakes came as the result of his "poor knowledge of the principal postulates of Marxism-Leninism," which prompted him "taking upon the subject far beyond his scientific qualification and scope of knowledge". Researcher's demand for this verdict to be openly discussed at the institute's Communist party committee was ignored.

Still, Ziegel had influential allies (whom he often mentioned, but never specified). In The Brief History of the UFO Studying in the USSR he wrote: "…So I had to forward letters to our country's highest quarters. I informed them of how important it was that the UFOs should be studied in the USSR, of how serious and significant this problem was and of this press campaign's sheer absurdity. And this time my voice was heard. These higher quarters interfered and made sure no repressive actions would be taken against me." Ziegel was expelled from the Znaniye (Knowledge) society where he lectured for more than thirty years, but retained his position at the MAI. People like physicists V.A. Lashkovtsev and B.N. Panovkin (his former student) continued to attack Ziegel, and, "Y. I. Parnov was not to be left behind. As A. P. Kazantsev informed me, speaking at the Writers' Union special Science fiction authors' congress on February 23, 1977, Yeremei Iudovich insisted that "Ziegel's lectures were the act of foreign ideological subversion. Their direct result has been our industry's labour efficiency’s 40 per cent drop!", Ziegel wrote.

In 1979 he formed another, this time unofficial group of the UFO investigation enthusiasts. It compiled thirteen type-written volumes of the classified UFO sightings evidence, complete with fresh theoretical works, summed up in the extensive thesis called "The Introduction to the Future UFO Theory".

=== Death ===
In 1985 Ziegel suffered a stroke. Recovered, he returned to the Aviation Institute full of new ideas and lecturing plans. A second stroke proved to be fatal; Felix Ziegel died on 20 November 1988. Tatyana Konstantinova-Ziegel told Argymenty I Fakty in March 2010: "For my father Stalinism has never ended. As the War broke out he, an ethnic German, was deported to Alma-Ata. After the War he had difficulties because his second name sounded too Jewish to many. And while in the years of the Thaw, the whole country started to shake itself off this horrible catatonia, in science the domination of "the one and only correct point of view" remained a norm. Obscurantism and common ignorance, unveiled malice from one group of people and secret jealousy of another – those were the reasons that prevented him from bringing his ideas to the general public's awareness." According to ufology.net at least 50,000 UFO reports collected by Ziegel have been left stored in the MAI computers. Tatyana Konstantinova-Ziegel claimed she was (as of 2011) still in a possession of 17 huge type-written volumes of her father's unpublished work.
