= Liu Yichang =

Hong Kong writer

Liu Yichang BBS, MH
- Liu holding a copy of his novel Intersection
- Born: Liu Tongyi; 7 December 1918; Shanghai
- Died: 8 June 2018 (aged 99); Chai Wan, Hong Kong
- Education: St. John's University, Shanghai
- Occupations: Novelist, editor, publisher
- Spouse: Lo Pai-wun (m. 1957)
- Parent: Liu Huaizheng
- Writing career
- Language: Chinese
- Period: 1942–2018
- Notable works: The Drunkard (1963), Intersection (1993)
- Movement: Modernism

Chinese name
- Traditional Chinese: 劉以鬯
- Simplified Chinese: 刘以鬯
- Hanyu Pinyin: Liú Yǐchàng
Transcriptions
Standard Mandarin
- Hanyu Pinyin: Liú Yǐchàng
- Bopomofo: ㄌㄧㄡˊ ㄧˇ ㄔㄤˋ
- Gwoyeu Romatzyh: Liou Yiichanq
- Wade–Giles: Liu^{2} I^{3}-chʻang^{4}
- Yale Romanization: Lyóu Yǐchàng
- IPA: [ljǒʊ ì.ʈʂʰâŋ]
Yue: Cantonese
- Yale Romanization: Làuh Yíh-cheung
- Jyutping: Lau4 Ji5coeng3
- IPA: [lɐw˩ ji˩˧.tsʰœŋ˧]

Liu Tongyi
- Traditional Chinese: 劉同繹
- Simplified Chinese: 刘同绎
- Hanyu Pinyin: Liú Tóngyì
Transcriptions
Standard Mandarin
- Hanyu Pinyin: Liú Tóngyì
- Bopomofo: ㄌㄧㄡˊ ㄊㄨㄥˊ ㄧˋ
- Gwoyeu Romatzyh: Liou Torngyih
- Wade–Giles: Liu^{2} Tʻung^{2}-i^{4}
- Yale Romanization: Lyóu Túngyì
- IPA: [ljǒʊ tʰʊ̌ŋ.î]
Yue: Cantonese
- Yale Romanization: Làuh Tùhng-yihk
- Jyutping: Lau4 Tung4jik6

Liu Yichang, BBS, MH (Chinese: 劉以鬯; 7 December 1918 – 8 June 2018), was a Shanghai-born and Hong Kong–based writer, editor and publisher. He is considered the founder of Hong Kong's modern literature.

His best-known works are The Drunkard (1963), considered China's first stream of consciousness novel, and Intersection (1993), which is composed of two interconnected stories. The two novels inspired Wong Kar-wai's award-winning films 2046 and In the Mood for Love, respectively. He was also a prolific columnist who edited 13 newspapers in China, Hong Kong, Singapore and Malaysia, on average writing 13,000 Chinese characters per day.

== Early life and career in China ==
Liu was born Liu Tongyi (劉同繹) on 7 December 1918 in Shanghai, with his ancestral home in Zhenhai, Ningbo, Zhejiang Province. His courtesy name was Changnian (昌年). His father was Liu Hao (劉浩), also known as Huaizheng (懷正), and he had an older brother.

In the summer of 1941, Liu graduated from St. John's University, Shanghai. The Pacific War soon broke out in December and the Empire of Japan occupied the Shanghai International Settlement. Worried about rumours that Japan was going to draft Chinese men into its army, Liu's father sent him to Chongqing, the war-time capital of the Republic of China. He spent the next few months travelling through Japanese-occupied areas and across the war front, finally reaching Chongqing in the spring of 1942. In Chongqing he worked as an editor for two major newspapers, Sao Dang Bao (掃蕩報) and Guomin Gongbao (國民公報), and was the first person in the capital to report the death of Japanese admiral Isoroku Yamamoto.

Liu returned to Shanghai after the surrender of Japan in 1945. Sao Dang Bao gave him the assignment to report on the surrender ceremony on board USS Missouri, but he was so eager to go home that he turned down the opportunity to witness the historic event. He continued to work for Sao Dang Bao in Shanghai, by then renamed as Peace Daily.

In 1946, he started the publisher Huaizheng Cultural Society (懷正文化社), which was named after his father, who had died in Shanghai under Japanese occupation. Although a new startup, Huaizheng secured the rights to publish the works of prominent writers such as Shi Zhecun, Dai Wangshu, and Yao Xueyin.

== Career in Hong Kong, Singapore, and Malaysia ==
As China became increasingly unstable during the Chinese Civil War and its economy ravaged by hyperinflation, Liu moved to British Hong Kong in 1948. He planned to continue his publishing business and brought many manuscripts with him, but found that Hong Kong lacked a market for serious literature. Instead he worked as an editor for the newspapers Hong Kong Times, Sing Tao Weekly, and West Point.

In 1952, he moved to Singapore to work as an editor for Yi Shi Bao. He later became editor-in-chief for Federation Daily in Kuala Lumpur, Malaysia, where he met the dancer Lo Pai-wun (羅佩雲) and married her in 1957.

In 1957, Liu returned to and settled in Hong Kong with his wife, working as editor-in-chief for the newspaper supplements of the Hong Kong Times and the Sing Tao Daily. He created the monthly journal Hong Kong Literature in 1985, and served as its chief editor until 2000. During his decades-long career as an editor, he nurtured well known authors such as the poet Yesi and the woman writer Xi Xi.

== Works ==
In 1963, Liu published the novel Jiutu (酒徒, The Drunkard, also translated as The Alcoholic). It was one of the first Chinese-language novels to use modernist techniques, and is considered China's first stream of consciousness novel. Liu, who had thought that only popular literature could survive in Hong Kong, said he wrote the novel to "entertain himself". Nevertheless, the work received wide acclaim and became highly influential. It inspired director Wong Kar-wai's film 2046, whose end credits paid explicit homage to Liu.

Another of Liu's novels, Intersection (對倒), was originally published as part of Liu Yichang's Collection. Utilizing an analogy of the tête-bêche (head-to-tail) arrangement of postal stamps in philately, it is composed of two interconnected stories, one about an old man, and another about a young girl. The novel inspired Wong Kar-wai's 2000 film In the Mood for Love. Following the release of the film, a symposium was held in Hong Kong for Liu's works and Intersection was published as a separate book. Liu Yichang's Collection was translated and published in French.

Considered the founder of Hong Kong's modern literature, Liu published more than 30 books over his six-decade-long career. In addition, he was a prolific columnist for the 13 newspapers he edited. He wrote on average 13,000 Chinese characters per day.

== Honours and awards ==
Some of the honours and awards Liu had received:

- Medal of Honour (2001), Government of Hong Kong
- Bronze Bauhinia Star (2011), Government of Hong Kong
- Honorary Doctorate in Literature (2011), Lingnan University
- Honorary Doctorate in Literature (2011), Open University of Hong Kong
- Award for Outstanding Contribution in Arts (2012), Hong Kong Arts Development Council
- Life Achievement Award (2014), Hong Kong Arts Development Council

== Death ==
On 8 June 2018, Liu died at Pamela Youde Nethersole Eastern Hospital in Chai Wan, Hong Kong, aged 99.
