= Shanghai Botanical Garden =

Botanical garden in China

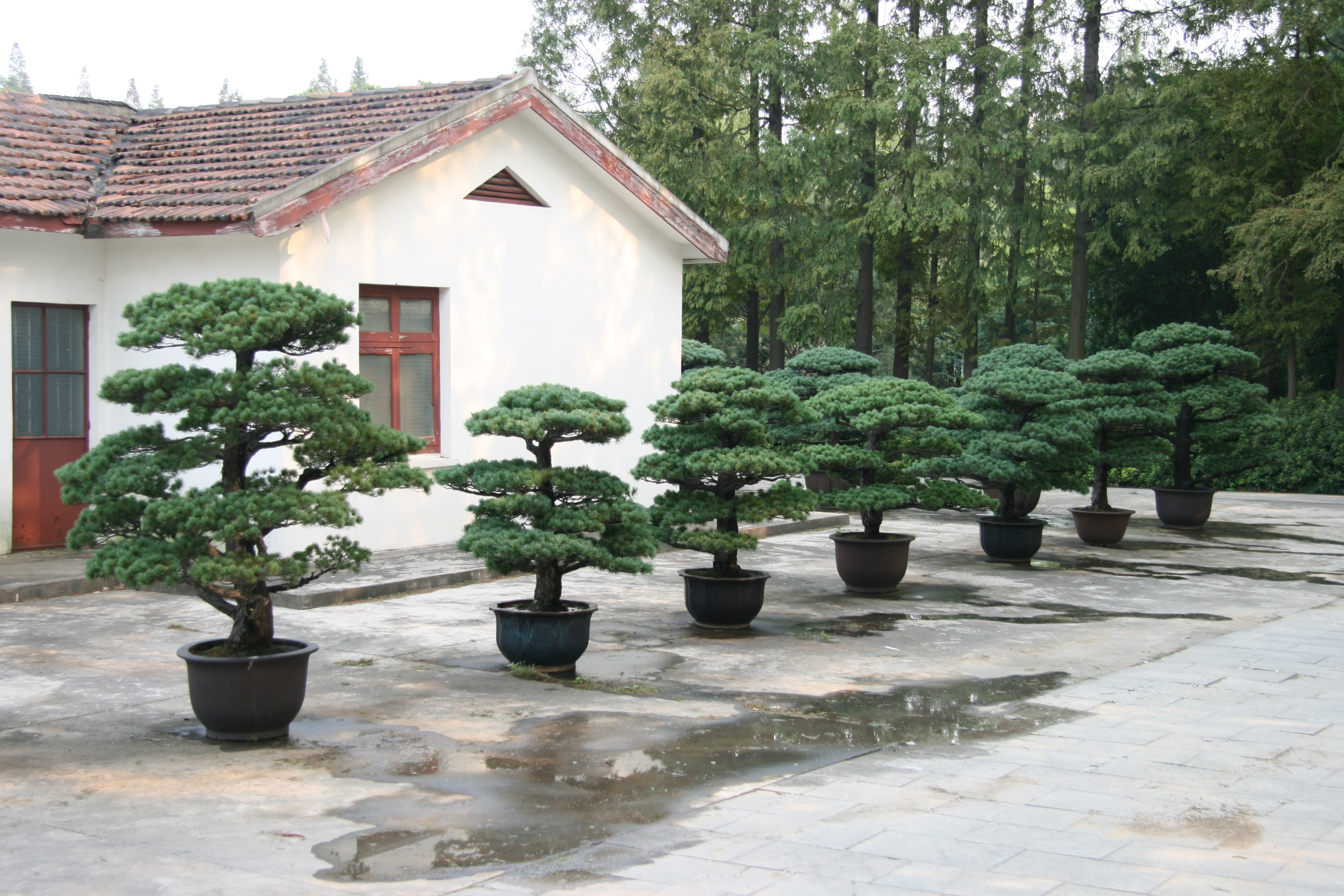
- Pine penjing in the Penjing Garden, Shanghai Botanical Garden.

- Location within Shanghai
- Type: Public
- Location: Shanghai, China
- Nearest city: Shanghai
- Coordinates: 31°08′52″N 121°26′17″E
- Area: 202.28 acres (81.86 ha)
- Created: 1974
- Status: Open year round

The Shanghai Botanical Garden (Chinese: 上海植物园) is a botanic garden located in the southwestern suburbs of Shanghai, China, (around 12 km southwest of the city centre) in the Xuhui District.

Covering 81.86 hectares, the garden has a renowned penjing garden, as well as collections of magnolias, roses, azaleas, peonies, conifers, maples, osmanthus and bamboo.

== History ==
The Shanghai Botanical Garden was established in 1974, and is located on the site of Longhua Nursery. The largest municipal botanic garden in China, it has won prizes in the Netherlands and Canada with plant displays. The garden is a member of Botanic Gardens Conservation International.

== Features ==
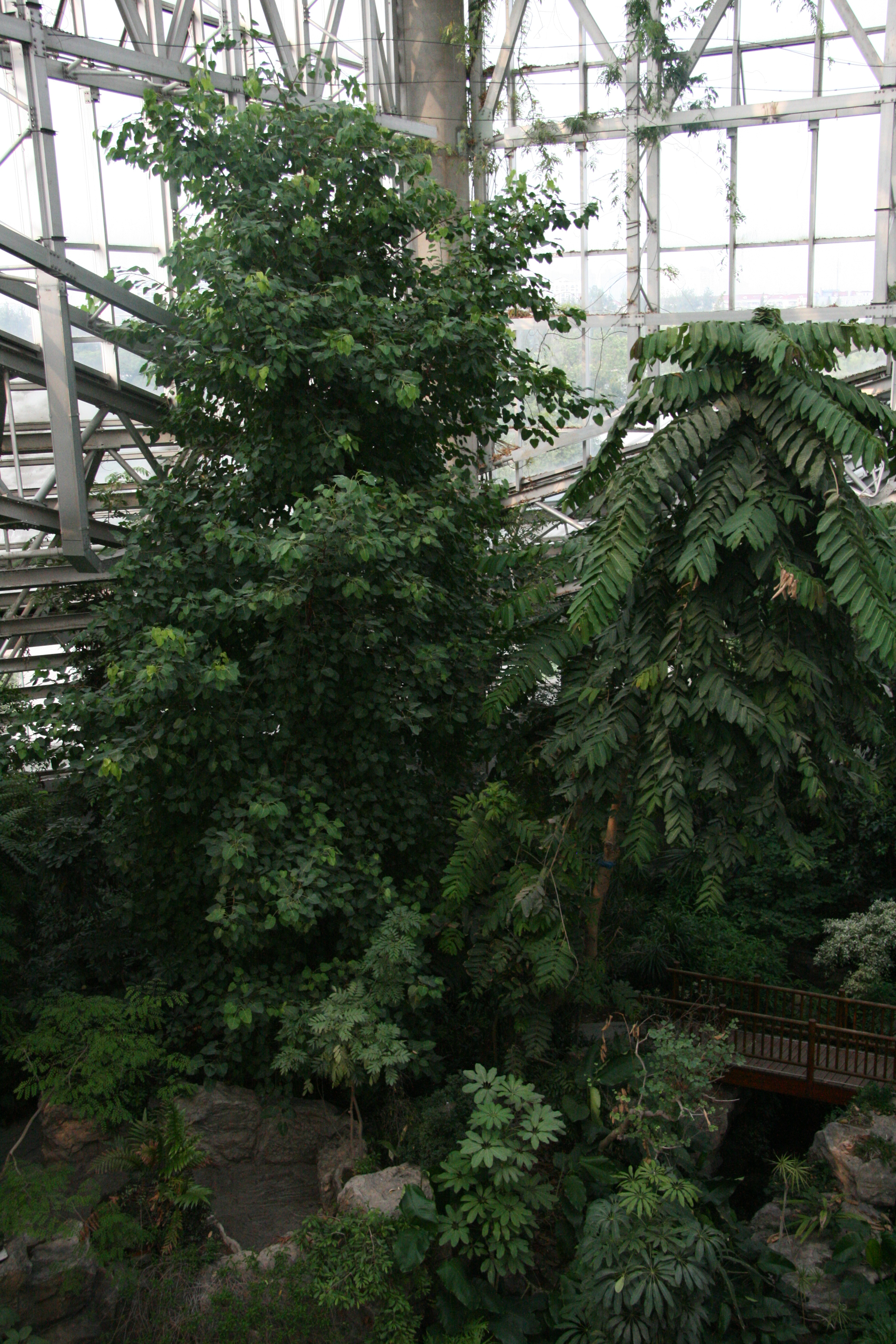
Inside the tropicarium.

Covering 81.86 hectares, the garden has a diverse collection of Chinese plants, including 3500 species and 6000 varieties of local regional flora from the Middle and Lower Yangtze River are located in the gardens.

The Penjing Garden was established in 1978 and is 4 hectares (9.9 acres) in size. A penjing museum was added in 1995. The 5000 square metre Tropicarium was opened to the public in 2001. It is a conservatory with 3500 species of tropical and subtropical plant.

Established in 1988, The Magnolia Garden covers 1.51 hectares and has 40 species, including Magnolia denudata, Magnolia liliiflora, Magnolia grandiflora, Magnolia cylindrica, Magnolia amoena, Michelia chapensis, Liriodendron chinense and others, including Magnolia × soulangeana. Established in 1980, the Peony Garden covers 3.24 hectares and has 120 cultivars of tree peony that were developed in China.

The Bamboo Garden was established in 1978 and has 74 species of bamboo across its 3.6 hectares. The 5.33 hectares of the Conifer Garden contain 280 species and varieties of conifer.

The garden employs a hundred horticultural staff, ten educational staff and thirty research staff.

== Transportation ==
Shanghai Botanical Garden can be reached on the Shanghai Metro using Shanghai Metro Line 3 to Shanghai South Railway Station or Shilong Road Station. Alternatively, it can be accessed by rail from the main Shanghai South railway station.

== See also ==
- List of Chinese gardens
