= Mu Shiying =

Chinese writer (1912–1940)

- 穆時英
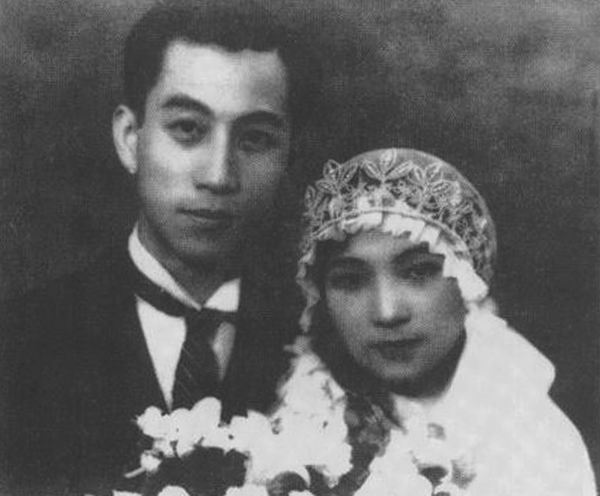
- Born: March 14, 1912
- Died: June 28, 1940 (aged 28); Shanghai
- Education: Guanghua University
- Occupations: writer, novelist
- Spouse: Qiu Peipei

Chinese name
- Traditional Chinese: 穆時英
- Simplified Chinese: 穆时英
Transcriptions
Standard Mandarin
- Hanyu Pinyin: Mù Shíyīng
- Wade–Giles: Mu Shih-ying

Mu Shiying (Chinese: 穆時英; March 14, 1912 – June 28, 1940) was a Chinese writer who is best known for his modernist short stories. He was active in Shanghai in the 1930s where he contributed to journals like Les Contemporains (Chinese: 現代; pinyin: Xiàndài, 1932–1935), edited by Shi Zhecun.

== Early life ==
Mu's family came from Cixi, Ningbo, Zhejiang. His father, Mu Jingting (1877–1933) was a banker and gold speculator, who apparently had died of exhaustion and depression after losing money in bad speculations. His mother was Shi Cuifeng (1895–1940). In his childhood, his family had already moved to Shanghai.

As a college student, Mu studied Chinese literature at Guanghua University in Shanghai.

In 1930, as a college student, he submitted a short story, "Our World" (Chinese: 咱們的世界; pinyin: Zánmen de shìjiè) to La Nouvelle Littérature (Chinese: 新文藝; pinyin: Xīn wényì, 1929–1930), a journal that was edited by Shi Zhecun, He Dong, Liu Na'ou (Chinese: 劉吶鷗), Dai Wangshu, and Xu Xiacun (Chinese: 徐霞村). The work was praised by the editors and Mu Shiying became a protégé of Shi Zhecun. Mu became good friends with Liu Na'ou and Dai Wangshu, both of whom were major contributors to the literary movement known as New Sensualism or the New Sensationists (Chinese: 新感觉派; pinyin: xīn gǎnjué pài; also see as: Shinkankakuha). This was an offshoot of a movement in Japan that borrowed from styles of literary modernism that were being developed in Europe and America. In time, Mu became the leading exemplar of this style.

== Career ==
Mu wrote over 50 short stories, several novels, screenplays, and numerous essays during his short lifetime. Among his most celebrated short stories are "Shanghai Fox-trot," "Craven A," and "Five in a Nightclub." Mu had a fascination for the city's cabaret culture and was reportedly a fantastic and avid dancer. His short stories conveyed in dream-like fashion the experience of living in the modern city and included many episodes in nightclubs and cabarets. He often focused on the tangled and tortuous relationships between his male narrator and a femme-fatale that he was chasing. One early example of this is "The Man Who Was Treated as a Plaything." He also wrote about the sensual aspects of women and their bodies in inventive ways, as in the case of the dance hostess "Craven A."

Mu pursued a Cantonese dance hostess named Qiu Peipei and eventually married her (see photo). However, they had a falling out. In 1936, Mu Shiying moved to Hong Kong to pursue his estranged wife. He stayed in Hong Kong, but he returned to Shanghai at the invitation of Liu Na'ou who was working with the Japanese. In 1939, Mu became the general manager of a collaborationist newspaper under Wang Jingwei's collaborationist government.

== Death ==
In 1940, while riding a rickshaw to his office, Mu was shot by assassins who were working for Chiang Kai-shek's underground resistance forces, and he died of blood loss on the way to the hospital. While rumors later suggested that Mu was a double agent, there has been no firm evidence of such a claim.

== Writing style ==
Mu Shiying is one of the famous writers of the New Sensualism, he had a dandyish image which was reinforced by his writings — often set in the dance halls of Shanghai. His most famous short stories are highly modernist pieces that attempt to convey the fragmented and inhuman nature of modern life in the metropolis. They experiment with expressionistic narrative techniques that break with a standard textual flow by juxtaposing disconnected visual images.

In his story "Shanghai Fox-trot" (Chinese: 上海狐步舞; pinyin: Shànghǎi húbùwǔ), Mu gave a "film-like" description on the life in Shanghai, especially the life in night.

In the story "The Lady in the Inky-Green Cheongsam" (Chinese: 墨綠衫的小姐; pinyin: Mòlǜ shān de xiǎojiě), Mu showed the fascination with exotic themes and locations, which was a popular culture in Shanghai during the 1930s.

Xun Si, a 1940s Chinese literary historian described him as "A belly full of Horiguchi Daigaku style witticisms, a Yokomitsu Riichi style of writing, a Hayashi Fusao style of creating new narrative forms, such is the content of Mr. Mu Shiying."

== Legacy ==
Poshek Fu of the University of Illinois discusses, and Margaret Blair portrays, the complex political situation faced by Mu and other modernist writers of the 1930s. Andrew David Field has written a lengthy appreciation of Mu's life and times and together with co-translator Hong Yu offers five original translations of Mu's short stories in his book Mu Shiying: China's Lost Modernist, including "The Man Who Was Treated as a Plaything," "Craven A", "Night," "Black Peony," and "Shanghai Fox-trot," along with a translation of "Five in a Nightclub" by Randolf Trumbull.
