= Ma Xiangbo =

Chinese Catholic education and civil servant

Ma Xiangbo SJ
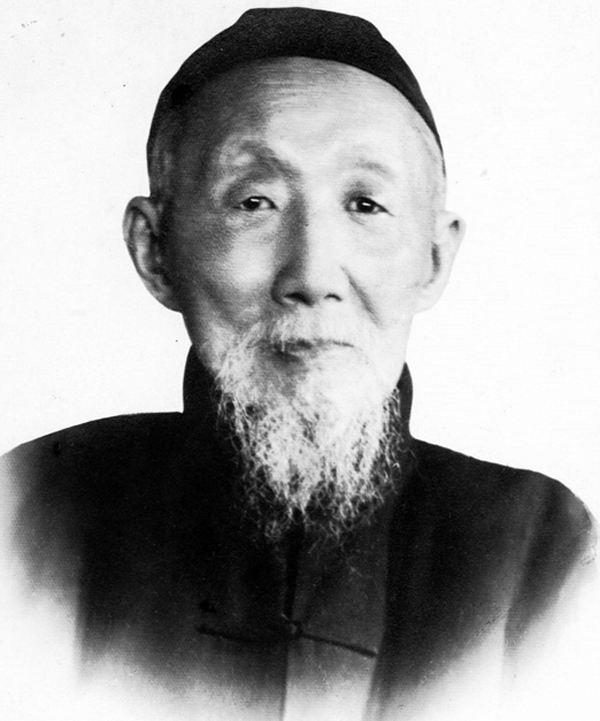
- Native name: Ma Liang

Orders
- Ordination: 1870
- Rank: Priest

Personal details
- Born: 7 April 1840 Dantu, Jiangsu, Qing dynasty
- Died: 4 November 1939 (aged 99) Lang Son, Tonkin, Indochinese Union
- Buried: Lang Son 1939-1952, Shanghai 1952
- Denomination: Roman Catholic
- Education: Collège Saint-Ignace, Shanghai

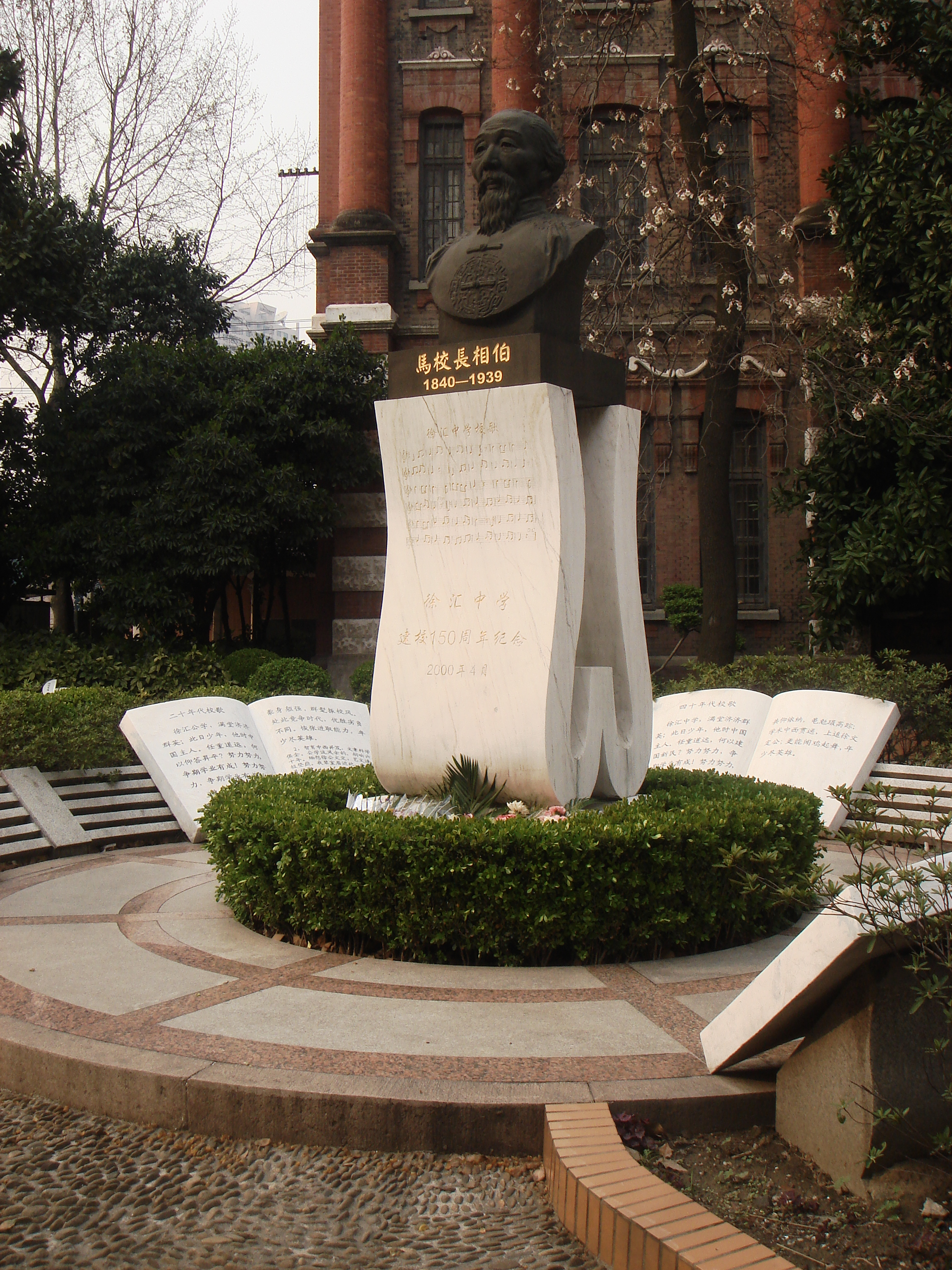
Ma Xiangbo's statue at Xuhui High School

Ma Xiangbo (traditional Chinese: 馬相伯; simplified Chinese: 马相伯; pinyin: Mǎ Xiàngbó; Wade–Giles: Ma^{3} Hsiang^{4}-po^{2}; April 7, 1840 – November 4, 1939) was a Chinese former Jesuit priest, scholar and educator in late-Qing and early-Republican China. He was one of the founders of Aurora University, Fu Jen Catholic University and Fudan University.

Ma Xiangbo's original given name was Jianchang (建常) but was changed to Liang (良). "Xiangbo" was his courtesy name. He also adopted the Catholic name Joseph.

== Biography ==
Ma Xiangbo was born in Dantu, Jiangsu province to a prominent Catholic family. At the age of 11, he enrolled in a French Jesuit school in Shanghai, Collège Saint-Ignace (now Xuhui High School), where he remained first as student and later as teacher until 1870.

In 1870, he was ordained priest in the Jesuit order. Ma left the order and priesthood because of its discrimination against Chinese clergy. Ma remained active in Chinese Catholic circles. After leaving the priesthood, he worked in civil service with his brother Ma Jianzhong.Both brothers led significant political lives, with Jiangzhong working as a prominent official in the Qing government and Xiangbo serving as a diplomat from 1881 to 1897 in various postings in Asia including Japan (Tokyo 1881, Yokohama 1892), Korea (1882-1885?), Europe (Britain and France 1886–1887) and the United States.

In 1886/87, he visited France and eventually devoted his life to higher education.

Ma was a major proponent of Catholic education in China. In 1903, Ma donated funds to found Aurora University (Zhendan Academy) under the auspices of French Jesuits. Its focus was to train translators to improve dialogue between traditional Chinese ideas and language and the ideas of Western modernity. Disagreements developed between Ma and the French Jesuits. They contended that Ma's pedagogical method and the resulting school atmosphere was chaotic. The vice director of the school sought to require top-down control of the curriculum and a French Université ethos. During the 1904-1905 academic year, the vice director alleged that Ma harbored revolutionaries at the university and abolished the student's self-governing body; Ma resigned.

Between 1912 and 1917, Ma and Ying Lianzhi petitioned the Holy See to establish an officially Catholic university in the capital of China's new republic. This helped bring about the founding of Catholic University of Peking, which was the only pontifical institution in China and the only Christian institution launched with an all-Chinese faculty.

Ma also founded the Fudan Public School (1905).

His idea of establishing a highest body of learning was eventually realized in 1928 by his close friend, the educator Cai Yuanpei, who established the Academia Sinica.

During the 1920s, Ma sought to mediate between the Catholic Church and its critics in the Anti-Christian Movement.

=== Views ===
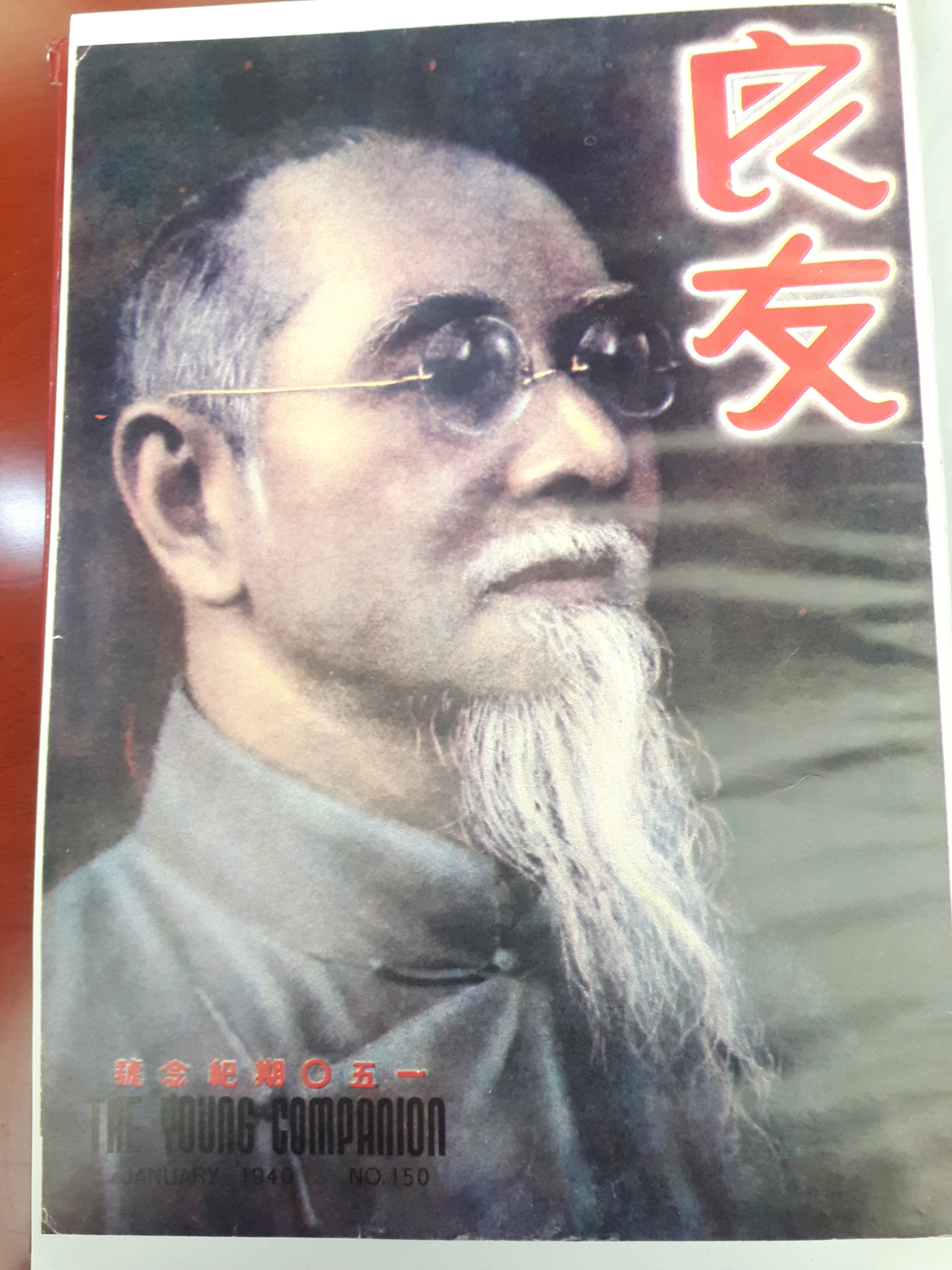
Ma Xiangbo was featured on the cover of The Young Companion magazine, #150, in April 1939. The magazine normally ran pictures of celebrity women and in war years political figures.

During the last decades of the Qing dynasty, he was a proponent for constitutional reform.

In his 1908 essay The Need for Political Parties, Ma wrote that political parties develop out of a natural human desire to belong to a group or nation, and that political parties are multiple because different sub-groups in turn have different views and goals. Ma wrote:

Even though we cannot force others in the nation to have exactly the same aspirations as our own, and it is inevitable that some people's views will be different, a group of us can express our aspirations and then various other groups will respond, seeking to pursue the aspirations they have in common and seeking to get rid of what they are opposed to.

In the early Republic of China, he was a major public voice in support of representative democracy.
