= Dai Wangshu =

Chinese poet and translator (1905–1950)

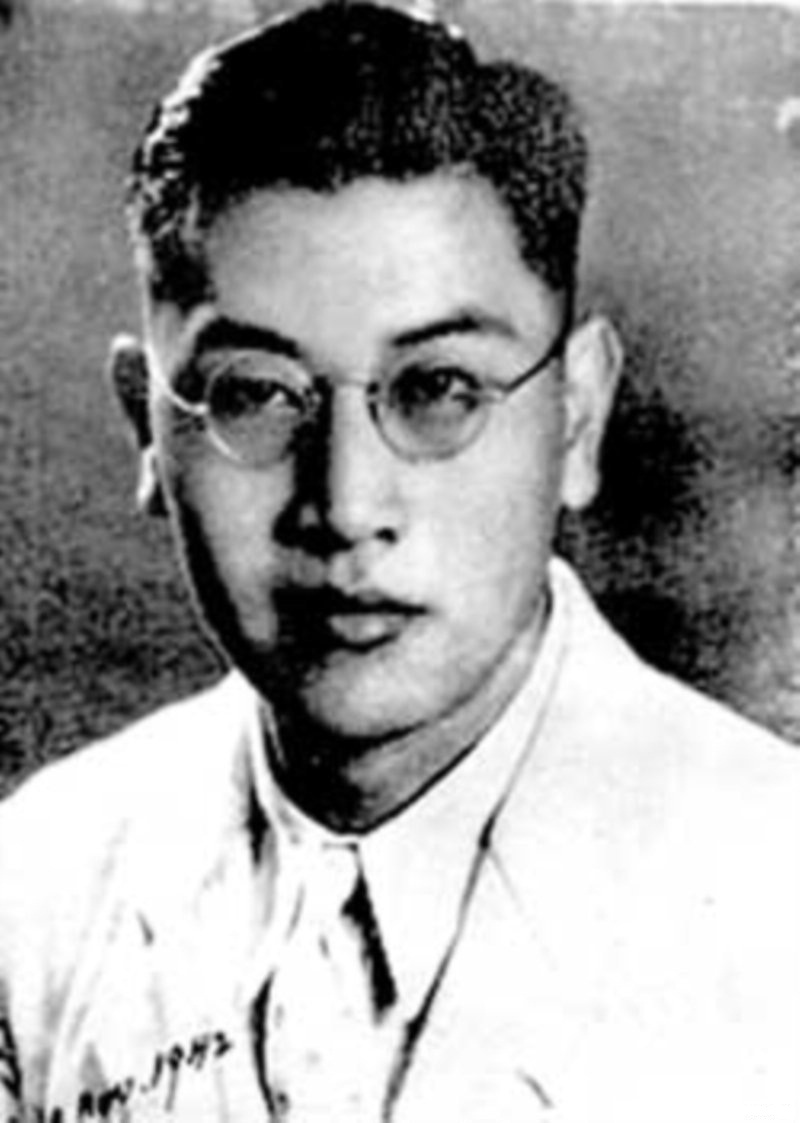
Dai Wangshu

Dai Wangshu (Chinese: 戴望舒; pinyin: Dài Wàngshū; Wade–Giles: Tai Wang-shu; March 5, 1905 – February 28, 1950), also Tai Van-chou, was a Chinese poet, essayist and translator active from the late 1920s to the end of the 1940s. A native of Hangzhou, Zhejiang, he graduated from the Aurora University, Shanghai in 1926, majoring in French.

He was closely associated with the Shanghai Modernist school, also known as New Sensibility or New Sensation School, a name inspired by the Japanese modernist writer Riichi Yokomitsu. Other members of the group were Mu Shiying, Liu Na'ou, Shi Zhecun, and Du Heng, whose Third Category thesis (that a writer could be on the left but remain independent) Dai defended against the hard line taken by the May Fourth Movement veteran Lu Xun.

== Early life and career ==
Given the birth name Dai Chaocai (Chinese: 戴朝寀; pinyin: Dài Cháocǎi), Dai Wangshu was born in Hangzhou, Zhejiang province. In 1923, he was admitted as a student into Shanghai University. Two years later, he would transfer to Aurora University where he studied French.

In 1929, his first collection of poems entitled "My Memory" (Chinese: 我的记忆) would be published.

Between 1932 and 1935 Dai studied in France at the University of Lyon's Institut Franco-chinois and published several poems in French. He collaborated in translating modern Chinese literature with French writer and academic René Étiemble, and met contemporary French poets such as Jules Supervielle.

During the Sino-Japanese War, Dai worked in Hong Kong as a newspaper editor. He was arrested and put into jail for several months during the Japanese occupation of Hong Kong. During this period Dai developed acute asthma. After the war, he returned to Shanghai and then Beijing, and died there having accidentally overdosed on the ephedrine he took to control his asthma.

== Poetic influences and translations ==
His early poetry has numerous intertextual links with the French Neo-symbolist poetry of Paul Fort and, in particular, Francis Jammes. Yet many references to pre-modern Tang Chinese lyric texts can also be discerned in his early poems. Some scholars have assumed that this "symbolist influence" came from more well-known French poets such as Verlaine and Baudelaire. However, while Dai Wangshu and other poets in China knew Verlaine's work through the versions of the English symbolist Ernest Dowson, there is no evidence of an early close inter-textual relationship with Baudelaire.

In the late 1940s, when he had returned from Europe and shifted from Neo-symbolism to a more generally modernist style (that drew also on Daoist texts), Dai translated Baudelaire's Les Fleurs du mal into Chinese. Dai, who had visited Spain before the Spanish Civil War, was the first to translate the poetry of Federico García Lorca and Pedro Salinas into Chinese.
