= Octavius William Borrell =

Marist Brother, missionary school teacher and botanist

Brother Octavius William Borrell FMS
- Born: 19 January 1916; Smyrna, Greece (now İzmir, Turkey)
- Died: 18 July 2007 (aged 91); Bulleen, Victoria, Australia
- Resting place: Marist Brothers section, Kilmore Catholic Cemetery, Kilmore, Victoria, Australia
- Other name: Marie Octave
- Education: The University of Melbourne
- Scientific career
- Fields: Botany
- Workplaces: Research associate, School of Botany, University of Melbourne

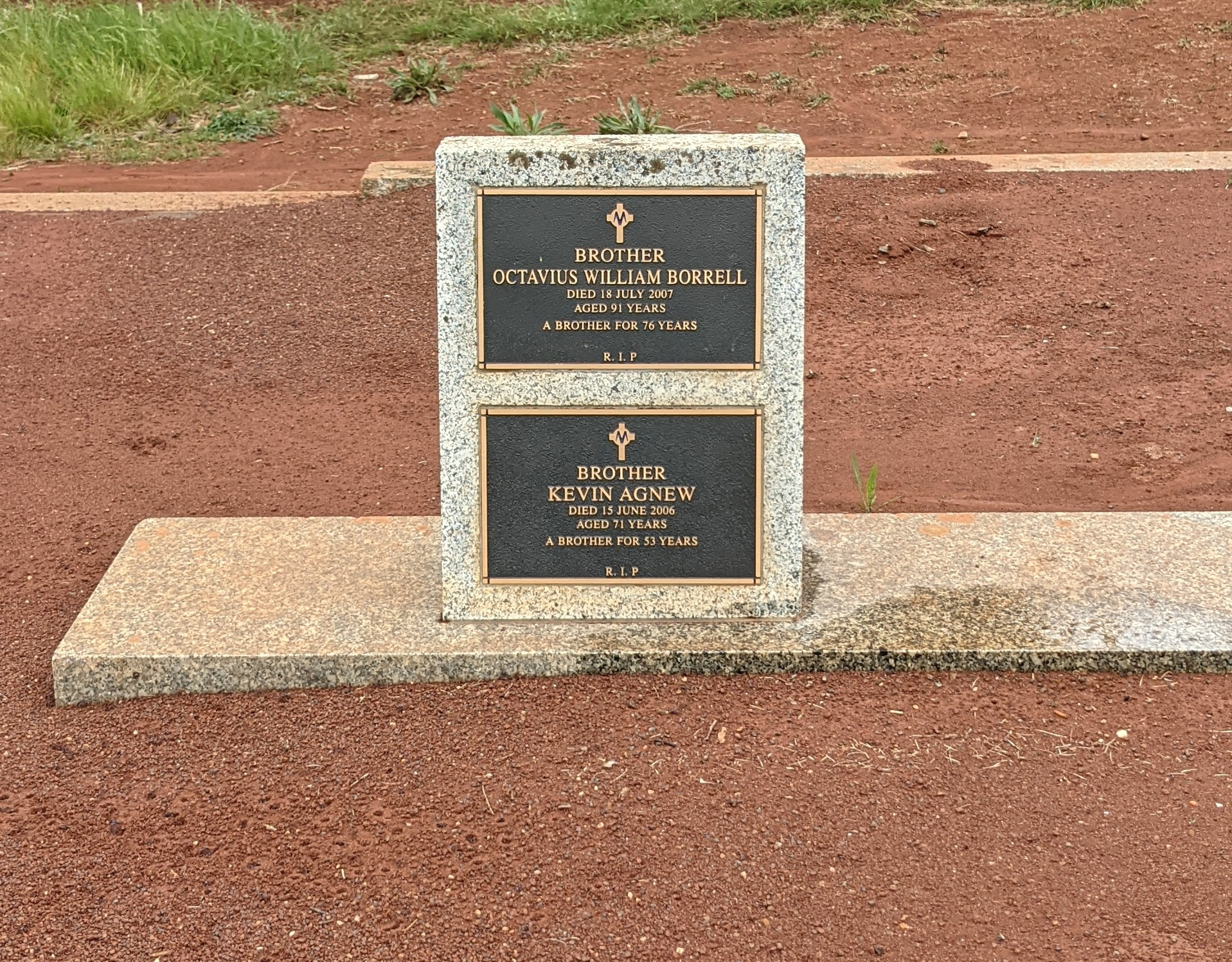
Grave markers of Octavius William Borrell and Kevin Agnew, in the Marist Brothers plot of the Catholic Cemetery, Kilmore, Victoria, Australia

Octavius William Borrell (19 January 1916 – 18 July 2007) was a Marist Brother, missionary school teacher and botanist.

== Life until 1952 ==
Octavius William Borrell was born in Greek Smyrna (today İzmir, Turkey) on 19 January 1916. In 1931, at the age of 15, he joined the Marist Order, and continued his secondary schooling at the Marist Brothers training college at Herakleion. From September 1935 until 1952, Brother William taught at Collège Sainte Jeanne D'Arc, a French–English bilingual school in Shanghai, with additional teaching at Collège Saint Ignace. During this period, he continued his own education, completing his baccalauréat.

While in Shanghai, Borrell became associated with the Musée Heude, formerly the Zikawei Museum (徐家汇博物院) located on the grounds of Université l'Aurore, a private French-language university, located in the Shanghai French Concession. From 1942 to 1945 he was the curator of museum's botanical department, and also collected specimens for the institution. With a colleague at the museum, Brother Paul August, together they wrote the manuscript, Flore de Changhai. Around the same time, a second manuscript on the trees and shrubs of Shanghai was prepared with a student, Xu Bingsheng.

During the Japanese occupation of Shanghai, Borrell and other missionaries spent 3 years in an internment camp. In 1952, Borrell left China to work in other schools. The contents of the Musée Heude was ultimately divided between several different government institutions, including the Shanghai Natural History Museum. It is unclear if any of the plant collections made in this period have been preserved.

== Teaching after 1952, and retirement ==
Borrell continued to teach in schools, including in Dumfries, Scotland, in Malaya, Sarawak, and Taiwan. He went on to teach at St. Francis Xavier's College, Kowloon, Hong Kong From 1974 to 1979, and again in 1980, he was posted to Saint Xavier's Secondary School on Kairiru Island in Wewak, East Sepik, Papua New Guinea.

He was finally posted to Melbourne in 1980, after which he retired and “"began his work to complete the many projects that he had begun over the years," including completing his studies into the floras of Kairiru, and of Shanghai. In 1981 and 1985 he returned to Kairiru to make further botanical collections.

== Return to Shanghai and Flora of the Shanghai Area ==
In 1991, Borrell returned to Shanghai for six months, where he worked with staff in the botany department of the Shanghai Natural History Museum, and became reacquainted with Professor Xu Bingsheng (徐炳声) of Fudan University. Borrell visited the Shanghai Botanical Garden, and collected on the rapidly urbanising outskirts of Shanghai, to ultimately produce an English-language translation and revision of his Trees and Shrubs of Shanghai manuscript, which became the multi-volume Flora of the Shanghai Area.

Brother William died on 18 July 2007 at Bulleen, Victoria, Australia, aged 91.

== Published major works ==
- O. W. Borrell "Report on an Archaeological Site on Mushu Island, near Wewak, P. N. G." Anthropos 715/6 (1976): 878–886.
- O. W. Borrell "A silver bracelet with an ancient Greek coin found in Wewak, East Sepik Province, Papua New Guinea" Journal of the Hong Kong Branch of the Royal Asiatic Society 285/6 (1988): 212–217. (Photographic plates.)
- O. William Borrell An annotated checklist of the flora of Kairiru Island, New Guinea (Bulleen, Vic. : O.W. Borrell, 1989).
- O. William Borrell “A short history of the Heude Museum, ‘Musee Heude.’ 1858-1952: Its Botanist and Plant Collector.” Journal of the Hong Kong Branch of the Royal Asiatic Society 31(1991): 183–191.
- O. William Borrell Flora of the Shanghai Area 上海植物誌 Volumes 1 and 2 (Collingwood: Brown Prior Anderson Pty Ltd, 1995).
- O. William Borrell and Xu Bing-sheng Flora of the Shanghai Area 上海植物誌 Volume 3. (Bulleen: Marcellin College, 2002).

== Significant herbarium collections ==
- The plant collections that Borrell made between May and October 1991 in Shanghai are now held by the National Herbarium of Victoria, Royal Botanic Gardens Victoria.
- Collections that he made during a posting to Kairiru, Wewak Islands, in Papua New Guinea are held by the Australian National Herbarium.
- Duplicates of collections made on Kairiru, were sent to the Papua New Guinea National Herbarium at Lae Botanic Gardens.

== Unpublished papers ==
- The State Botanical Collection of Victoria, held at the National Herbarium of Victoria, Royal Botanic Gardens Victoria includes Brother William's unpublished papers, and manuscripts. This also includes an unpublished typescript of Shanghai Trees and Shrubs.
- The University of Melbourne Archives include field notes, and records relating to plants of Hong Kong, and a typeset paper on The Ferns of Hong Kong.
