= Shi Zhecun =

Chinese essayist, poet, and translator

Shi Zhecun (simplified Chinese: 施蛰存; traditional Chinese: 施蟄存; pinyin: Shī Zhécún; Wade–Giles: Shih Che-ts'un; December 3, 1905 – November 19, 2003) was a Chinese essayist, poet, short story writer, and translator in Shanghai during the 1930s. He was known for his poetry and essays, but is most known for his modernist short stories exploring the psychological conditions of Shanghai urbanites (see New Sensationists). From the 1940s onwards, he translated western novels into Chinese and worked as a scholar of classical Chinese literature.

== Early life and education ==
Shi Zhecun was born in Zhejiang, but later he moved to Songjiang in Jiangsu following his father who was a teacher. He showed an early interest in poetry and started publishing his works from his youth. He studied English in Shanghai and a little French at Aurora university, which was founded by French Jesuits in 1903. It was there that he met several writers with whom he later founded the journal Xiandai.

== Creative work and career ==
Shi Zhecun was active on the Shanghai literary scene. He worked as the chief editor of Les Contemporains (Xiandai 现代 1932–1935). It was a monthly literary journal "which published a hundred translations from foreign literature (primarily U.S. and Japanese)". The journal introduced Chinese readers to trends in modern literature and art. It covered foreign and Chinese topics and promoted the works of Shi Zhecun's friends, such as Mu Shiying and Dai Wangshu.

Shi's short stories (about 70) were written between 1928 and 1937. They cover a range of topics, from absurdist ghost stories to gentler pieces on the strains faced by modern couples in Shanghai. His most famous short story is probably "An Evening of Spring Rain" (Meiyu zhi xi 梅雨之夕). His works set in Shanghai frequently deal with the inner lives of the protagonists as they are beset by irrational fears and desires.

In 1937, after the Japanese invasion of Shanghai, Shi Zhecun moved to Yunnan. He held university posts and translated novels by Arthur Schnitzler among others. He became a scholar on classical culture and did research on Tang dynasty poetry and stele inscriptions.

In 1947, he returned to Shanghai and began writing essays, and after the Cultural Revolution, his memoirs.

In 1952, he joined the Chinese Department of East China Normal University as a professor and participated in the Chinese Writers Association.

In 1974, he worte a memoirs, Miscellaneous Poems of a Floating Life (Fusheng zayong 浮生杂咏) which contains eighty poems of him.

During the Chinese Cultural Revolution period, Shi Zhecun's works were banned because he was defined as a rightist writer (the second type of person who opposes the Communist Party and socialism). His works did not re-enter public's attention until 1980

His creative works were long considered politically suspect by the Chinese government because in 1957 he published the essay Talent and Morality and was classified as a rightist and subjected to persecution. From that time and onwards he bid farewell to literary creation and translation and turned to the study of classical literature and tablet inscriptions jobs. But there has been mounting interest since the 1980s due to the influx of modernist thoughts into China. His works have been republished in recent years.

He died on 19 November 2003 in Shanghai.

== Shi Zhecun's writing style ==
Modernism is a branch of literature that represents the new style and new kinds of expression, and Shi Zhecun, is one of the greatest Chinese representative authors of modernism . Under the historical background happened in 1919, which is the May Fourth Movement, anti-feudal and anti-old ideas became the main trend among the younger generations. During this period, more and more fictions about new thoughts or breaking the past were published. The General's Head (Jiangjun de tou 将军底头1932) is one of them. Being influenced by Sigmund Freud, Shi's articles emphasize on psychoanalytic, he uses such method to subvert the perception of history of ordinary people and attempt to give a new understanding of history.

== Selected works ==
An Evening of Spring Rain (Meiyu zhi xi 梅雨之夕) is a story about a married man who suddenly encountered heavy rain on his way home from get off work and met a beautiful girl without an umbrella. It has a short plot and focuses more on the psychological description of this man. When he saw this woman and found that she looked like his first love, he felt happy. Then the rain stopped and he had to part with the woman, and when he finally got home, his heart is full of loss and melancholy. Such a description technique shows the readers the psychological path of the protagonist in the text, which can attract readers and make the characters more vivid.

The General's Head (Jiangjun de tou 将军底头1932) writes about General Hua of the Tang dynasty. He was commanded by the emperor to conquer Tubo. During the conquest, he fell in love with a woman and this woman made him yearn for sex for the first time in his life. However, General Hua's head was cut off by the enemy's general and the enemy's general's head was cut off by General Hua. When General Hua rode his horse back to the camp and brought the enemy general's head to meet the girl he loved, the headless General Hua was laughed at by his beloved girl. General Hua fell to his horse and died on the ground. At the end of the article, the Tibetan General's head was smiling, by contrast, General Hua's head on the ground was crying.

== Shi Zhecun's famous books ==
=== Short stories ===
The General's Head (Jiangjun de tou; 将军的头1932), An Evening of Spring Raina (Meiyu zhi xi; 梅雨之夕), Spring Festival Lamp (Shangyuan Deng; 上元灯)

==== Translation works ====
Pelle the Conqueror (By Martin Andersen Nexø 1910), Under the Yoke (By Ivan Vazov 1893)

== Shi Zhecun's work translated into English and French ==
Mes amis (Hermits United, 2026)

== Awards ==
- In view of his contribution to the literary creation and academic research, Shi Zhecun was awarded the Outstanding Contribution to Shanghai Literature and Art Award (1993)
- He also obtained the Asian Chinese Writer Literary Foundation Consolation Award.

== External sources ==
Lee, Leo Ou-fan. Shanghai Modern: The Flowering of a New Urban Culture in China, 1930-1945. Cambridge, MA: Harvard University Press, 1999.

Schaefer, William. “Kumarajiva's Foreign Tongue: Shi Zhecun's Modernist Historical Fiction.” Modern Chinese Literature, vol. 10, no. 1/2, 1998, pp. 25–70. JSTOR 41490772. Accessed 4 Dec. 2020.

Rosenmeier, C. (2017). Tradition and Hybridity in Shi Zhecun and Mu Shiying. In On the Margins of Modernism: Xu Xu, Wumingshi and Popular Chinese Literature in the 1940s (pp. 24–43). Edinburgh: Edinburgh University Press. Retrieved December 4, 2020, from JSTOR 10.3366/j.ctt1pwt2dj

Kang-i Sun Chang; Poetry as Memoir: Shi Zhecun's Miscellaneous Poems of a Floating Life. Journal of Chinese Literature and Culture 1 November 2016; 3 (2): 289–311. doi: doi:10.1215/23290048-3713815

Wang, Yiyan. “Venturing Into Shanghai: The ‘Flâneur’ in Two of Shi Zhecun's Short Stories.” Modern Chinese Literature and Culture, vol. 19, no. 2, 2007, pp. 34–70. JSTOR, JSTOR 41490981. Accessed 17 Dec. 2020.

Rosenmeier, Christopher. “Women Stereotypes in Shi Zhecun's Short Stories.” Modern China, vol. 37, no. 1, 2011, pp. 44–68. JSTOR 25759538. Accessed 17 Dec. 2020.
