= Ma Jianzhong =

Chinese official and scholar

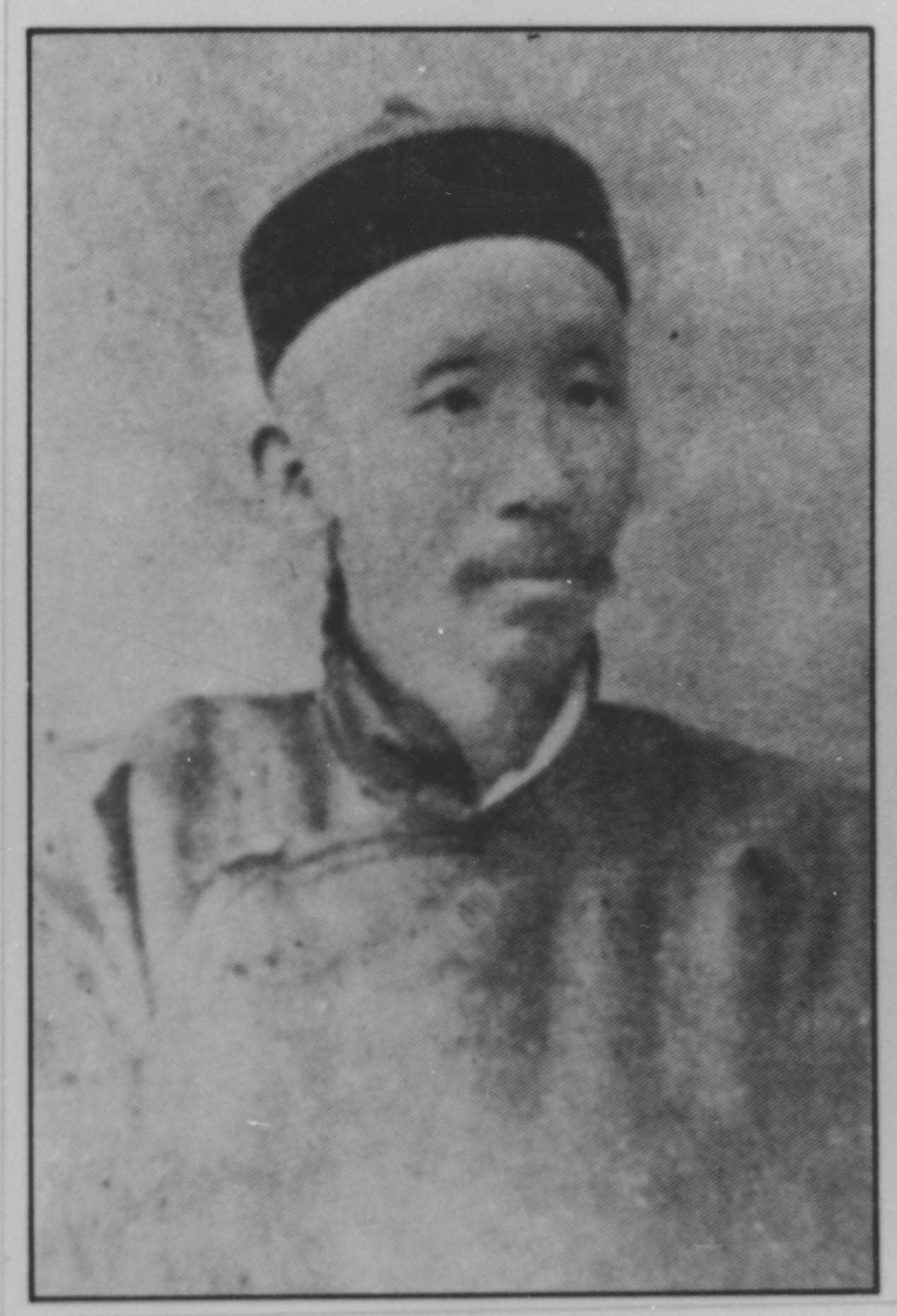
Ma Jianzhong

Ma Jianzhong (Chinese: 馬建忠; pinyin: Mǎ Jiànzhōng; Wade–Giles: Ma Chien-chung; 1845 – 1900), courtesy name Meishu (Chinese: 眉叔; pinyin: Méishū), also known as Ma Kié-Tchong in French, was a Chinese official and scholar in the late Qing dynasty.

Ma was born in Dantu (丹徒), Jiangsu province to a prominent Chinese Catholic family. After studies at a French Catholic school in Shanghai, Ma went to France in 1876 to study international law. He became the first Chinese to obtain a baccalauréat and in 1879 he obtained a diploma in law (licence de droit) from École Libre des Sciences Politiques (known today as Sciences Po) in Paris.

Following his return to China in 1880, Ma became a member of Li Hongzhang's secretariat, where Ma's knowledge of international law became a useful asset. Among other things, Ma helped to carry out Qing policy in Korea in 1880–82 and he took part in the arrest of Taewŏn'gun. In 1884, he also became involved in the China Merchants' Steam Navigation Company, where he worked closely with Tong King-sing. He was also involved in the design of the flag of Korea, opposing its shared use of Qing China's dragon flag and suggesting the design of taeguk and palgwae.

Ma is the author of Mashi Wentong (馬氏文通 "Basic principles for writing clearly and coherently by Mister Ma"), the first textbook of Chinese grammar written by a Chinese (there were already several grammars written by Westerners), published in 1898. Today most scholars believe that Ma's older brother Ma Xiangbo, a famous educator and co-founder of Fudan University, also contributed to the work.

Ma had been requested by Li Hongzhang, for whom he had previously worked for since 1880s to assist after the Eight-Nation Alliance stormed Beijing as part of the Boxer Rebellion and died on August 4, 1900, in Shanghai.
