= New Sensationists =

The New Sensationists (simplified Chinese: 新感觉派; traditional Chinese: 新感覺派; pinyin: Xīn Gǎnjué Pài) was a group of writers that emerged in the late 1920s in Shanghai, whose revolutionary use of language, structure, theme, and style is seen as influential to Chinese modernist literature. They wrote fiction that was more concerned with the unconscious and with aesthetics than with politics or social problems. Among these writers were Mu Shiying, Liu Na'ou, and Shi Zhecun.
