= Mashi Wentong =

1898 Chinese grammar book

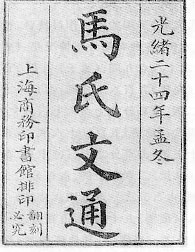
Mashi Wentong

Mashi Wentong (Chinese: 馬氏文通; pinyin: Mǎshì Wéntōng, English: Ma's Grammar) is the first grammar of the Chinese language written by a Chinese scholar, Ma Jianzhong, who published it in 1898. Although the "germination of modern linguistics in China" is attributed to this book, Mashi Wentong was criticized by critics such as Chen Chengze and Li Jinxi as imitating Western grammar and imposing the Western grammatical tradition on Chinese.
