= René Étiemble =

French writer

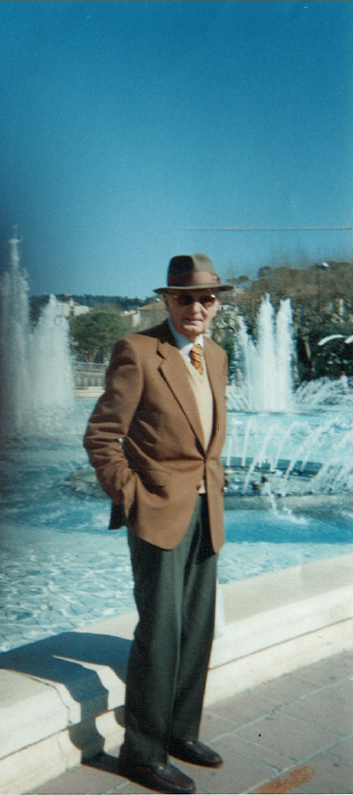
René Étiemble

René Ernest Joseph Eugène Étiemble (26 January 1909 in Mayenne, Mayenne – 7 January 2002 in Vigny) was a French essayist, scholar, novelist, and promoter of Middle Eastern and Asian cultures. Known commonly by his family name alone, Etiemble held the coveted Chair of Comparative Literature, in 1955, at the Institute of General and Comparative Literature in the pre-1968 Sorbonne University and continued in his post as a tenured Professor (and after retirement in September 1978 as an Honorary Professor) at the Sorbonne-Nouvelle University from 1956 to 1978. His doctoral dissertation on the Myth of Rimbaud and his many interpreters world-wide won him fame in 1952. However, one critic thinks Étiemble's derisive tone and some ill-founded conjectures about Rimbaud's later life undermine the book's credibility today. During World War II, he taught at the University of Chicago and was attached to the Office of War Information in New York in 1943. After the war, he taught French literature at the University of Alexandria, from 1944 to 1948, and thereafter at the University of Montpellier, France. He was the author of some sixty works (and edited the celebrated UNESCO Oriental Series for Gallimard publishers) Among his more popular works: Connaissez-vous la Chine? (Do you know China?), Gallimard 1964, and Quarante ans de mon maoïsme (1934-1974) (Forty years of my Maoism) Gallimard 1976.

He enjoyed a formidable reputation as a literary critic and daring polemicist, which led to an official prize from the French Academy. He also published three novels, one of which Blason d'un corps. [Paris: Editions Gallimard, 1961] is still remembered and read avidly. He is also remembered for his translations of Lawrence of Arabia's works into French. As militant communist and anti-fascist in his youth, he became interested in the Chinese communist movement. Together with the Chinese poet Dai Wangshu 戴望舒 (1905-1950) he produced a number of translations of the works of left-wing Chinese writers and published these in a special issue of Commune (February 1934), organ of the French anti-fascist writers' and artists' association (Association des Écrivains et Artistes Révolutionnaires).

In his later years, he was a vehement defender of human rights and his book detailing and denouncing the increasing anglicization of the French language, Parlez-vous franglais? (Do you speak Franglais?), attracted a wide readership.

In 1988, he was awarded the Balzan Prize for comparative literature.
