= Shanghai Xuhui High School =

High school in Shanghai, China

Coordinates: 31.1945°N 121.4314°E

- 上海市徐汇中学
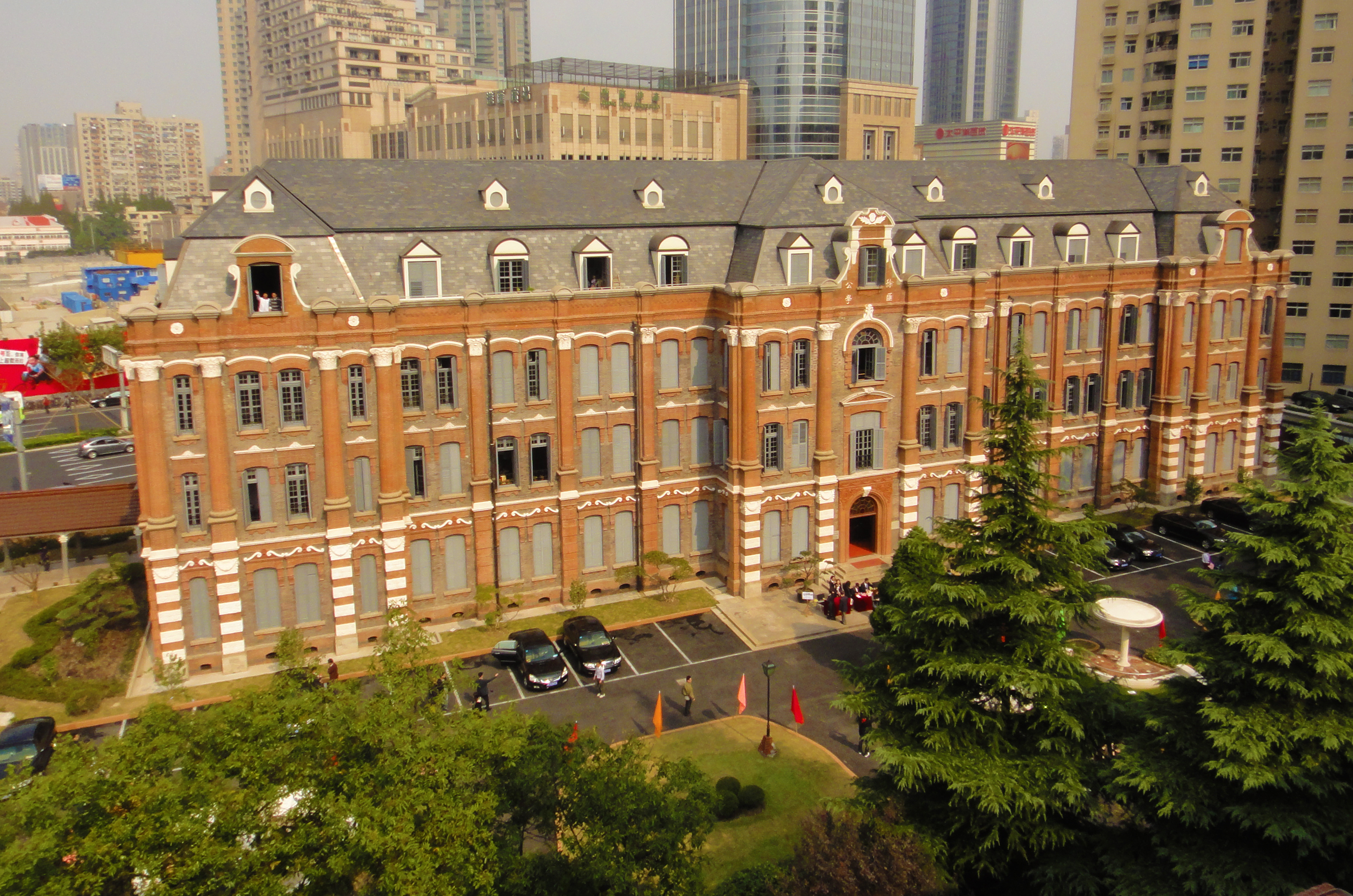
- Chongsi Building
- 68 Hongqiao Road; 1138 Panyu Road; Shanghai, China

Information
- Established: 1850
- School district: Xuhui District, Shanghai, China
- Principal: Xiaoyan Liu
- Enrollment: 2500+
- Information: (021) 64382894
- Website: www.shxhzx.cn

Shanghai Xuhui High School (上海市徐汇中学), formerly known as Collège Saint Ignace is a public secondary school in Xuhui, Shanghai.

== Gallery ==
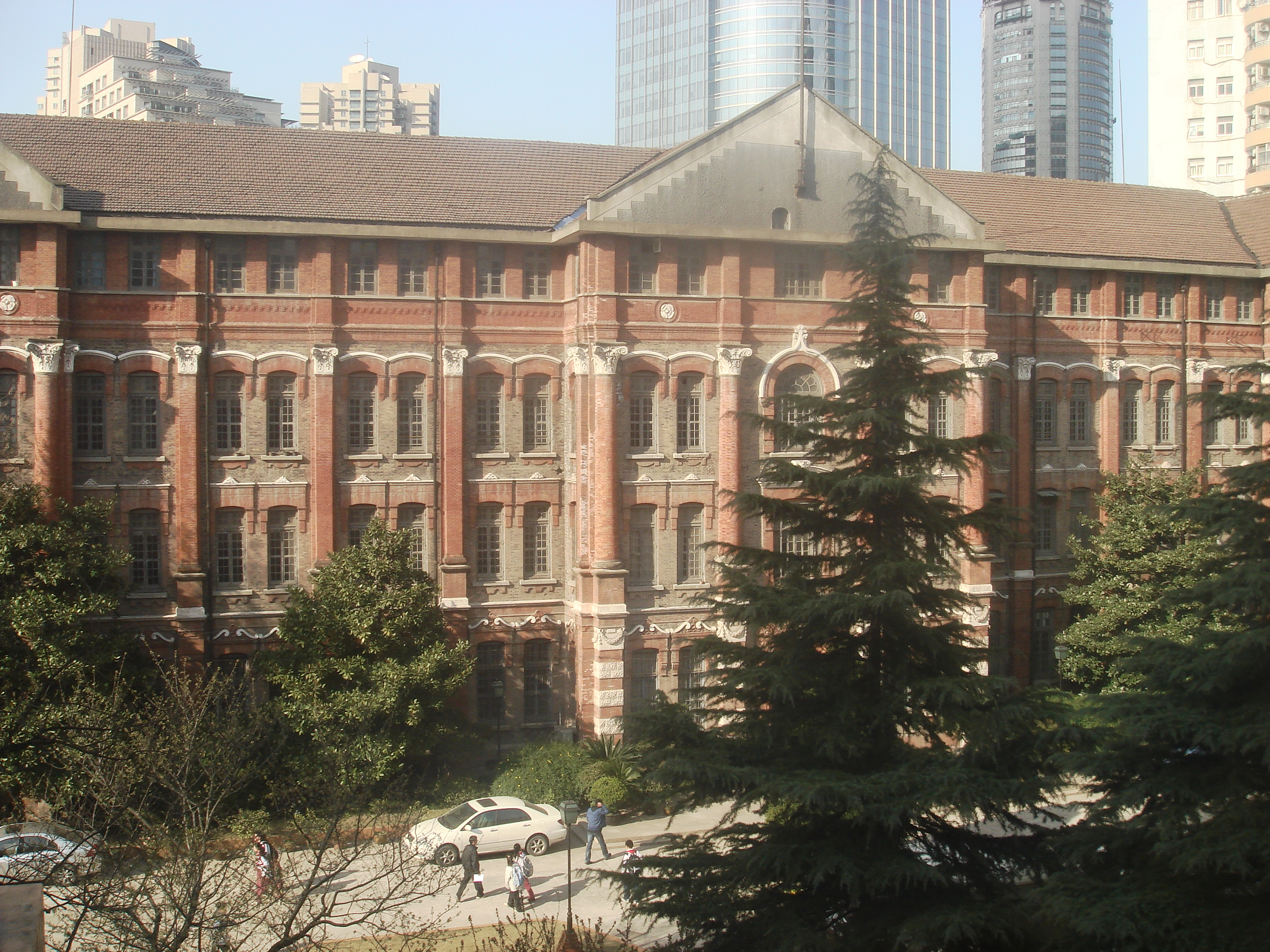
Chongsi Building

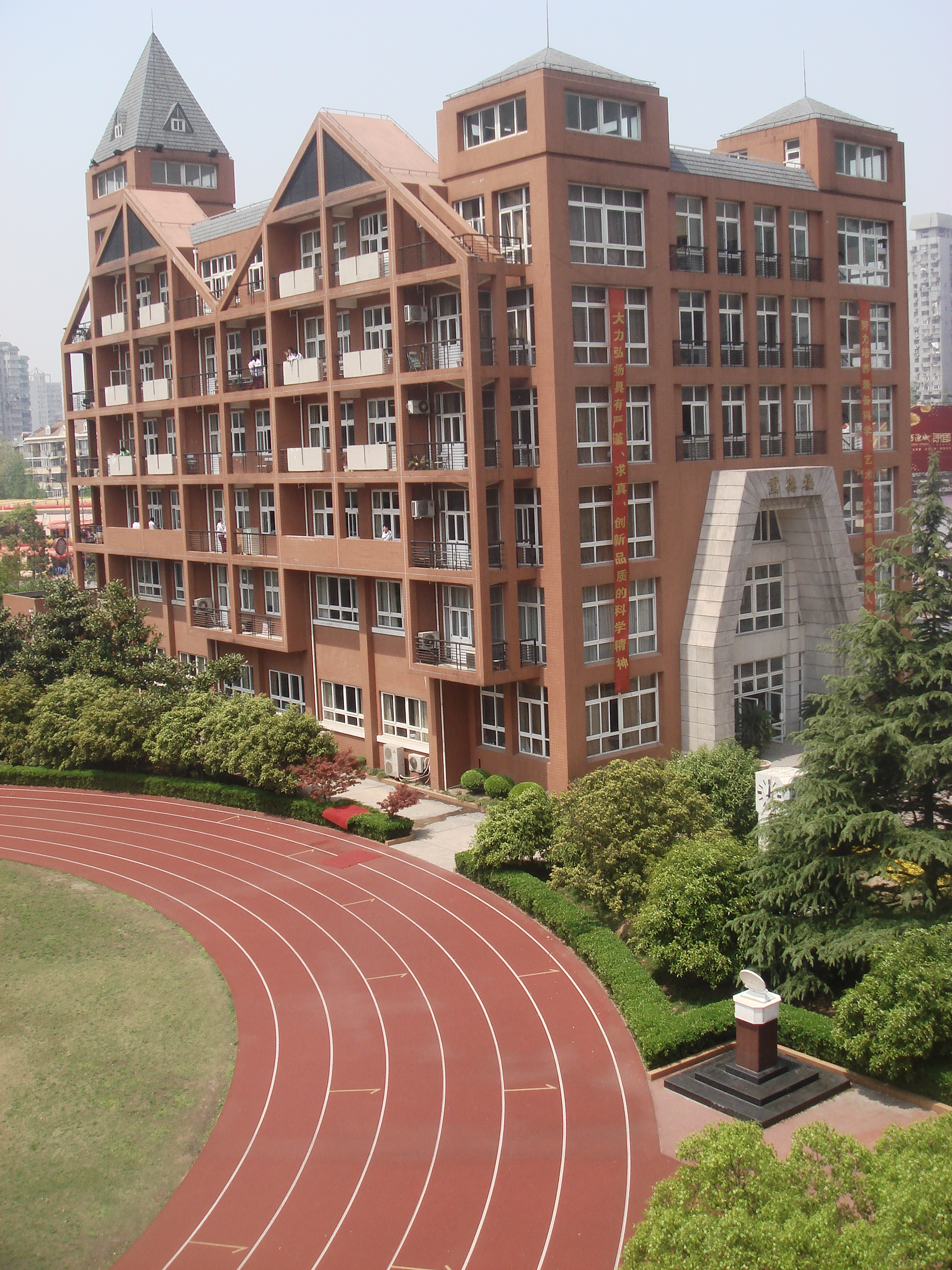
Zhongde Building

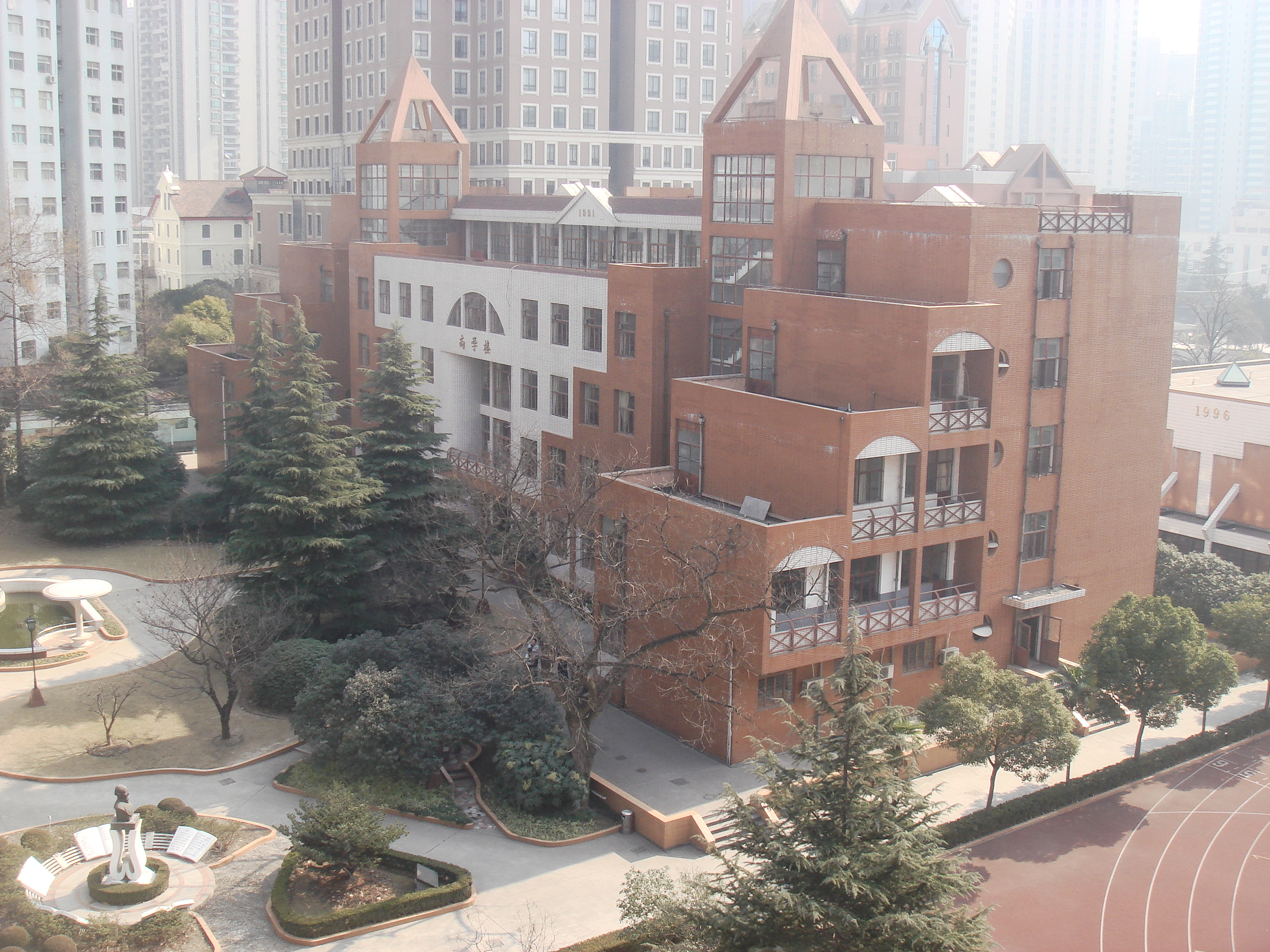
Shangxue Building

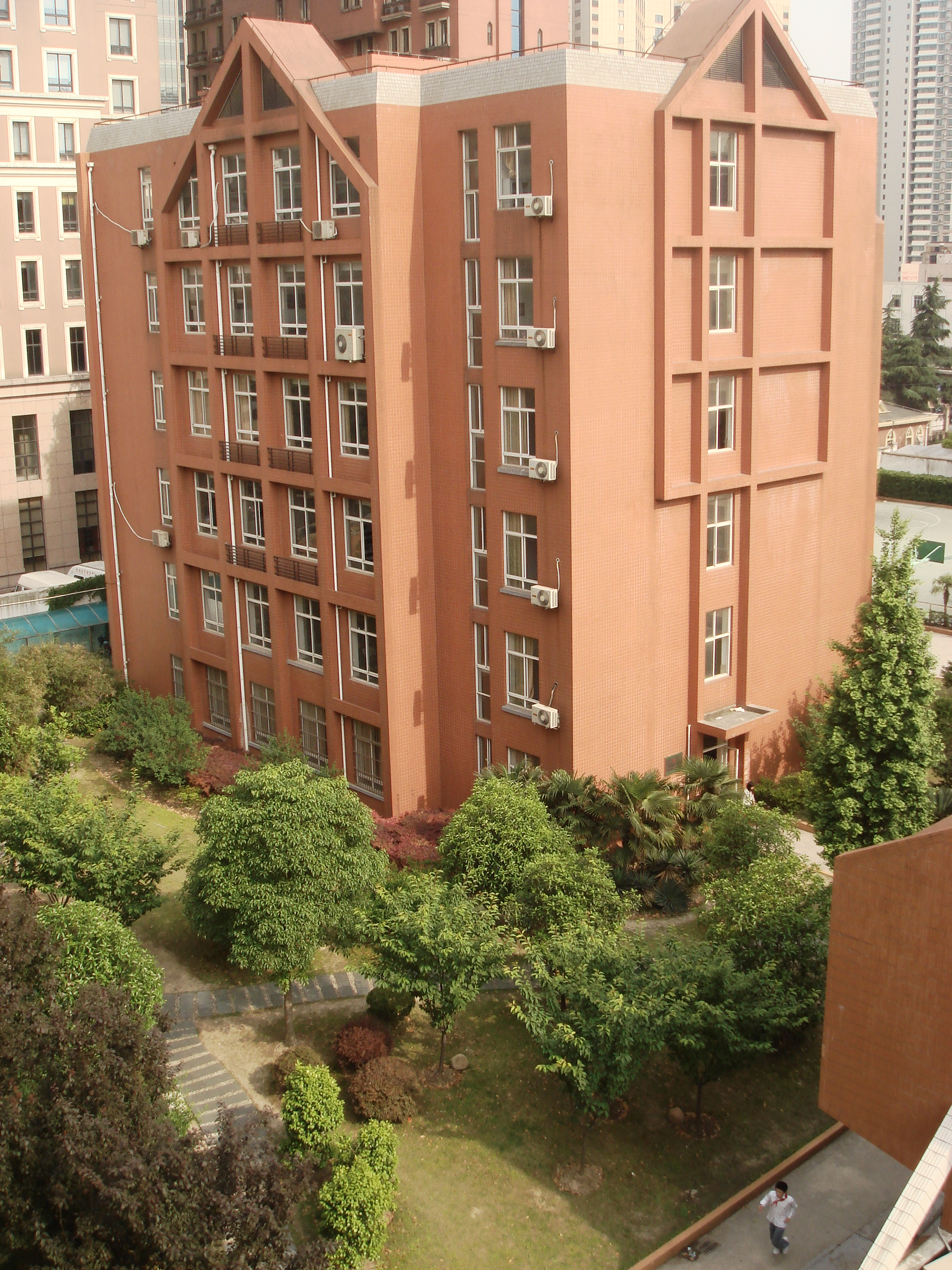
Lixing Building

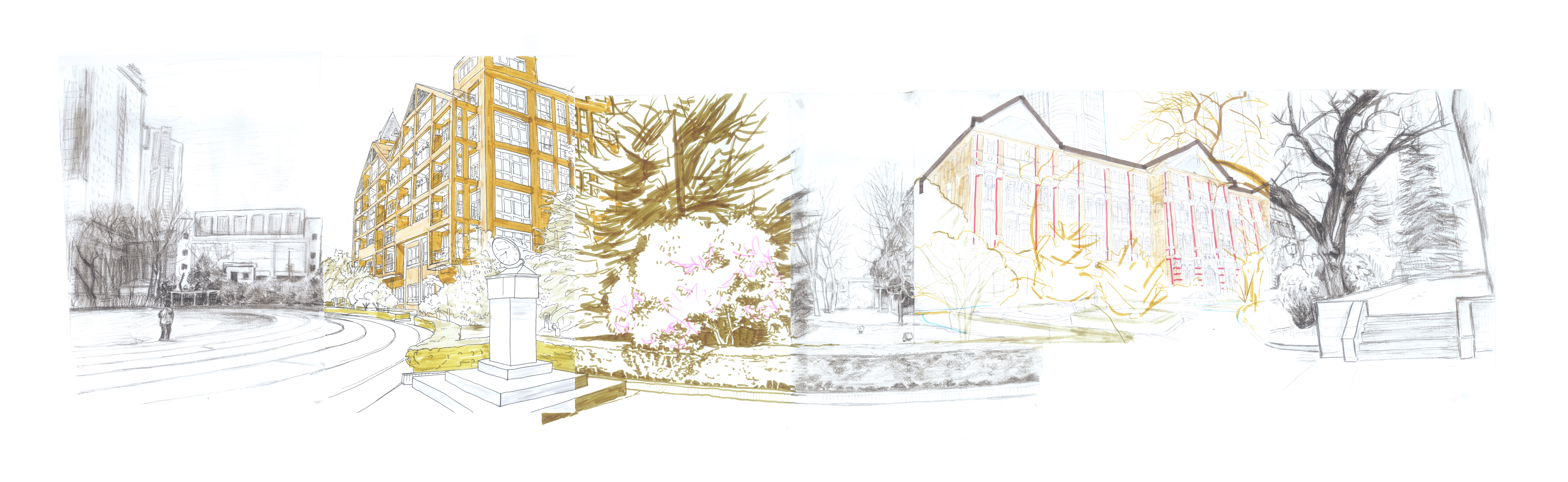
A drawing of the campus

== Notable alumni and staff ==
=== Science ===
- Brother Octavius William Borrell, Marist brother who taught at the College, and who studied the flora of Shanghai in the 1940s and 1990s.
