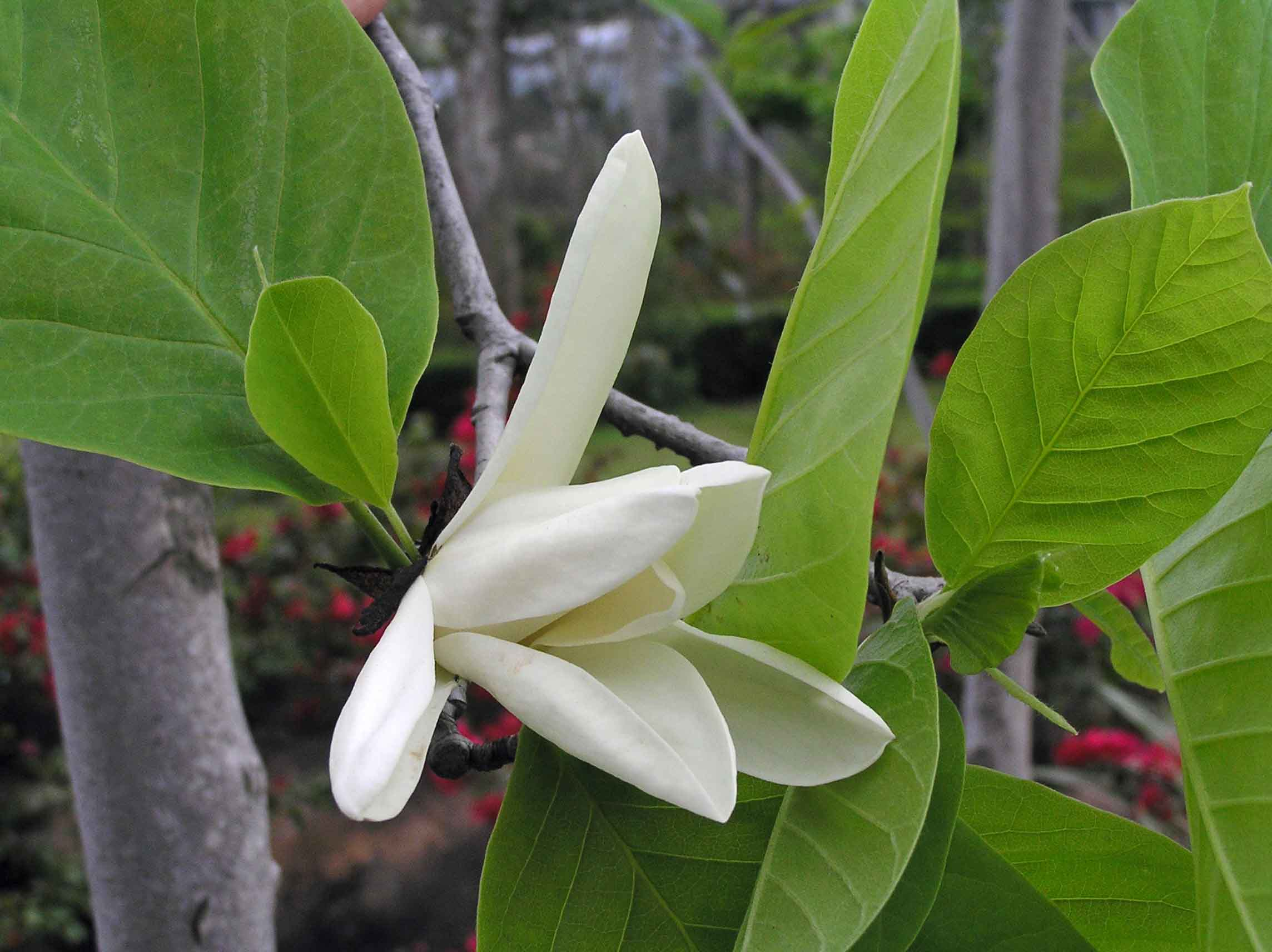
- In bloom in Hong Kong. Other specimens have yellower flowers.
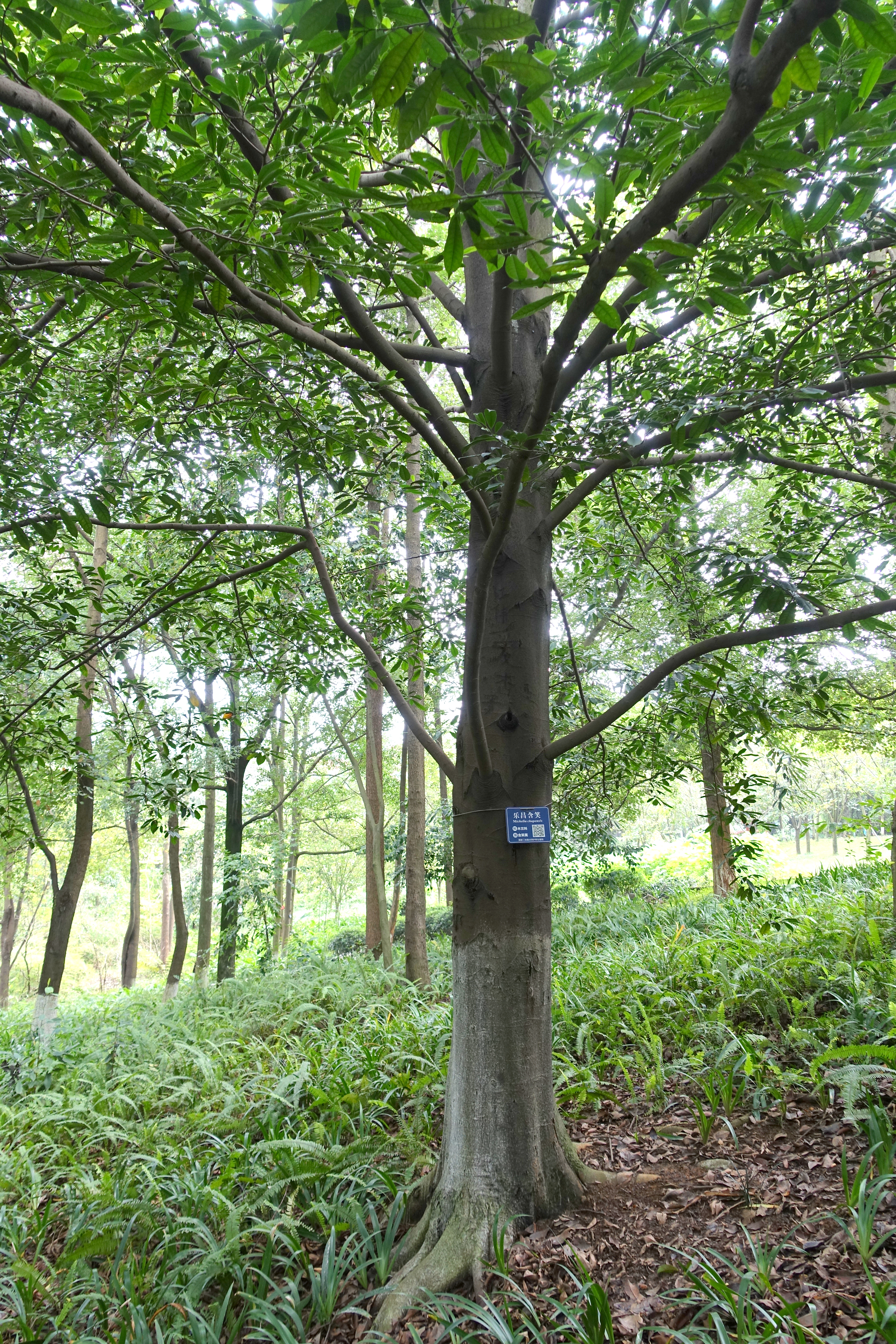
- At Chengdu Botanical Garden.

Conservation status
- Least Concern (IUCN 3.1)

Scientific classification
- Kingdom: Plantae
- Clade: Embryophytes
- Clade: Tracheophytes
- Clade: Spermatophytes
- Clade: Angiosperms
- Clade: Magnoliids
- Order: Magnoliales
- Family: Magnoliaceae
- Genus: Magnolia
- Species: M. chapensis

Binomial name
- Magnolia chapensis (Dandy) Sima

Synonyms
- List: Magnolia jiangxiensis (Hung T.Chang & B.L.Chen) Figlar; Magnolia microcarpa (B.L.Chen & S.C.Yang) Sima; Michelia brachyandra B.L.Chen & S.C.Yang; Michelia chapensis Dandy; Michelia chartacea B.L.Chen & S.C.Yang; Michelia constricta Dandy; Michelia glaberrima H.T.Chang; Michelia jiangxiensis Hung T.Chang & B.L.Chen; Michelia microcarpa B.L.Chen & S.C.Yang; Michelia tsoi Dandy

= Magnolia chapensis =

Species of flowering plant

Magnolia chapensis (syn. Michelia chapensis) is a species of flowering plant in the family Magnoliaceae, native to southern China and northern Vietnam. A tree reaching 30 m (100 ft), it is hardy to USDA zone 7b. It has found wide use as a street tree in southern Chinese cities.
