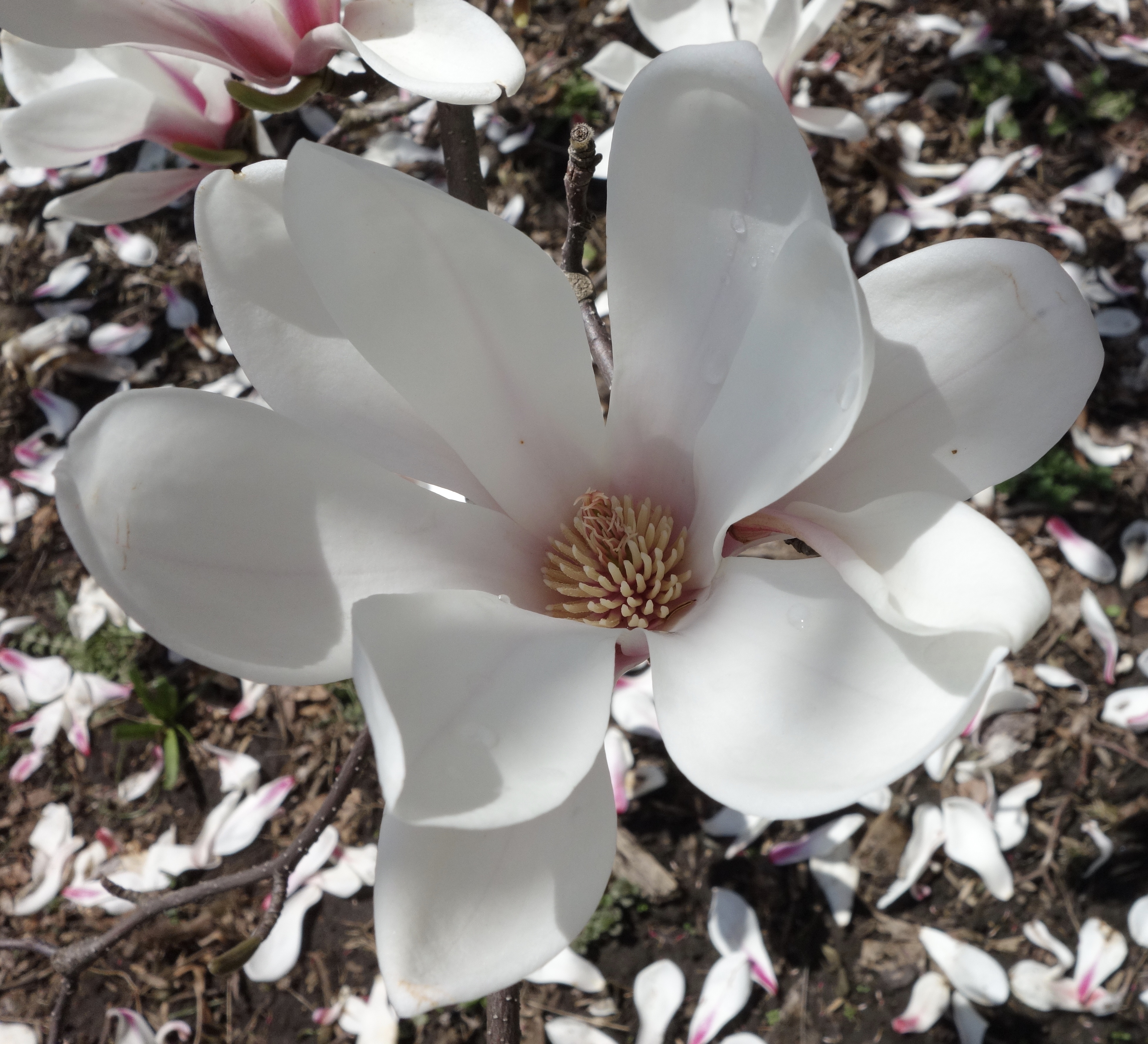
- Magnolia cylindrica flower. Arnold Arboretum of Harvard University, accession #158-83*B.

Conservation status
- Vulnerable (IUCN 3.1)

Scientific classification
- Kingdom: Plantae
- Clade: Tracheophytes
- Clade: Angiosperms
- Clade: Magnoliids
- Order: Magnoliales
- Family: Magnoliaceae
- Genus: Magnolia
- Subgenus: Magnolia subg. Yulania
- Section: Magnolia sect. Yulania
- Subsection: Magnolia subsect. Yulania
- Species: M. cylindrica

Binomial name
- Magnolia cylindrica E.H.Wilson

= Magnolia cylindrica =

Species of flowering plant

Magnolia cylindrica, the Huangshan magnolia (named for Mount Huang, where it can be found naturally), is a species of plant in the family Magnoliaceae. It is endemic to southeastern China (Anhui, Zhejiang, Jiangxi, Fujian). It is threatened by habitat loss.

== Description ==
Magnolia cylindrica is a deciduous tree or shrub, 5–12 m tall. Its leaves are obovate, 10–17 cm long, 4–10 cm wide. Flowers appear before leaves, they are mostly white, fragrant, about 8 cm wide. Fruit is pink, cylindrical, 5–8 cm long, 2–3 cm wide.

== Gallery ==
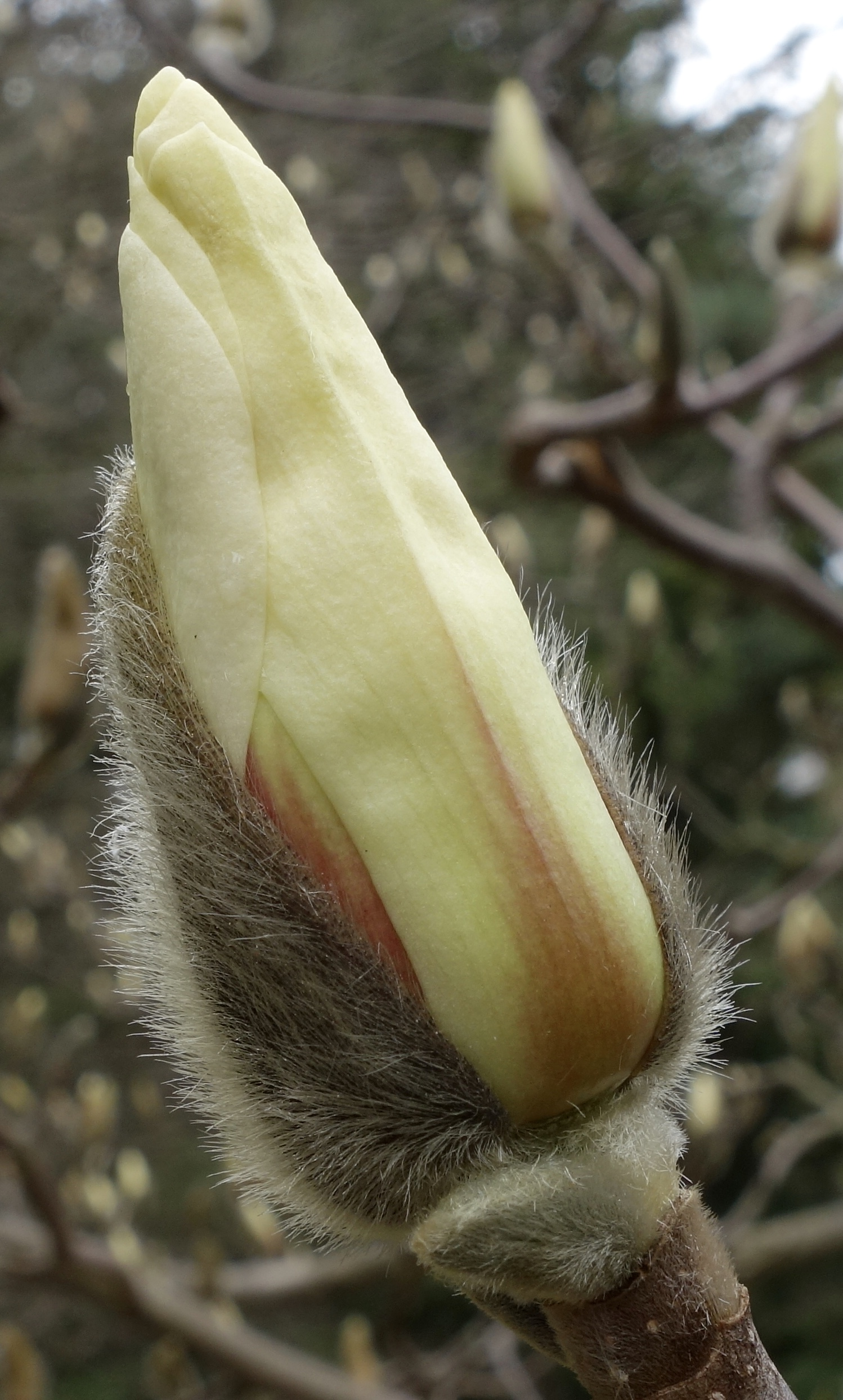
Flower bud

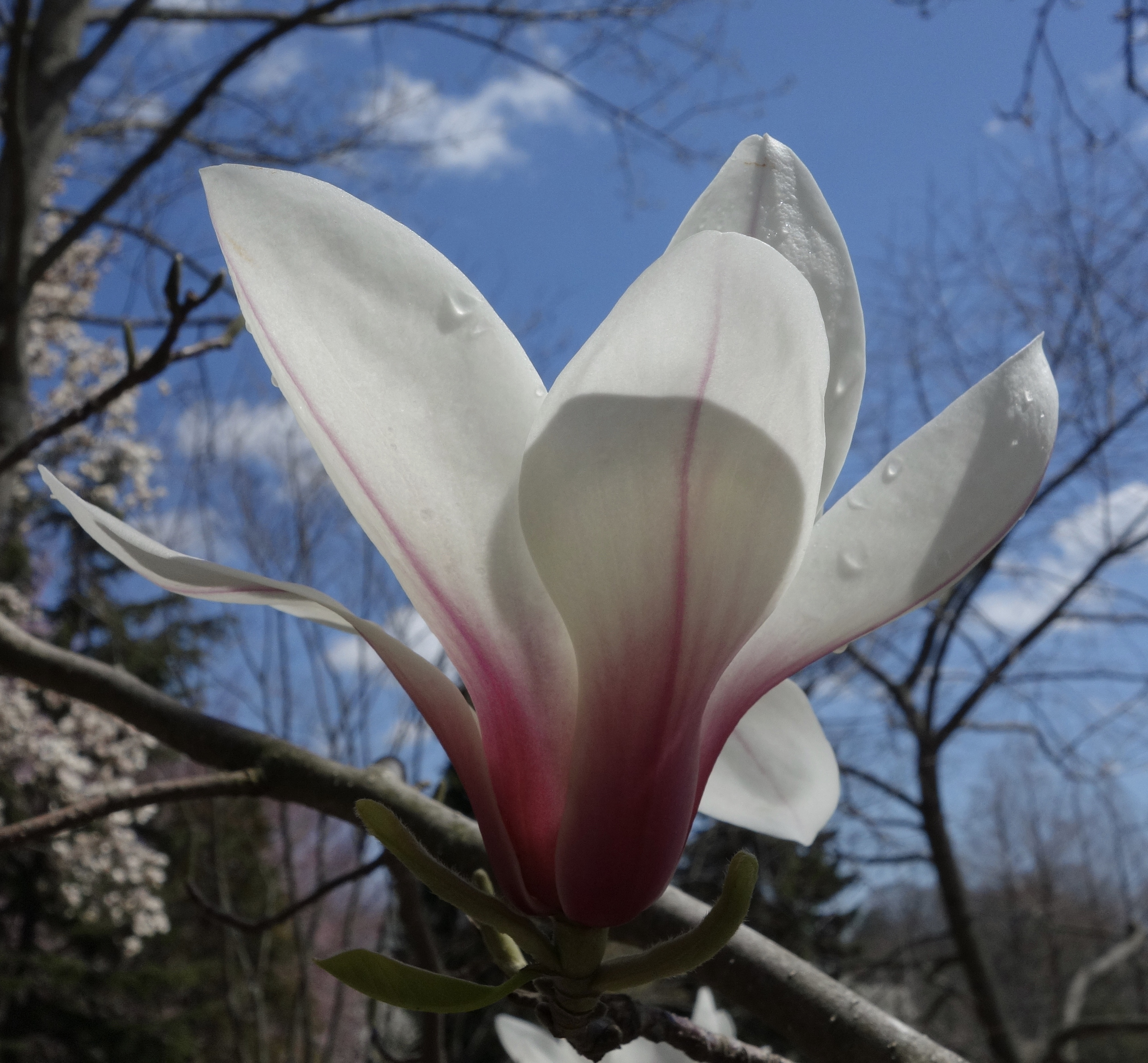
Flower

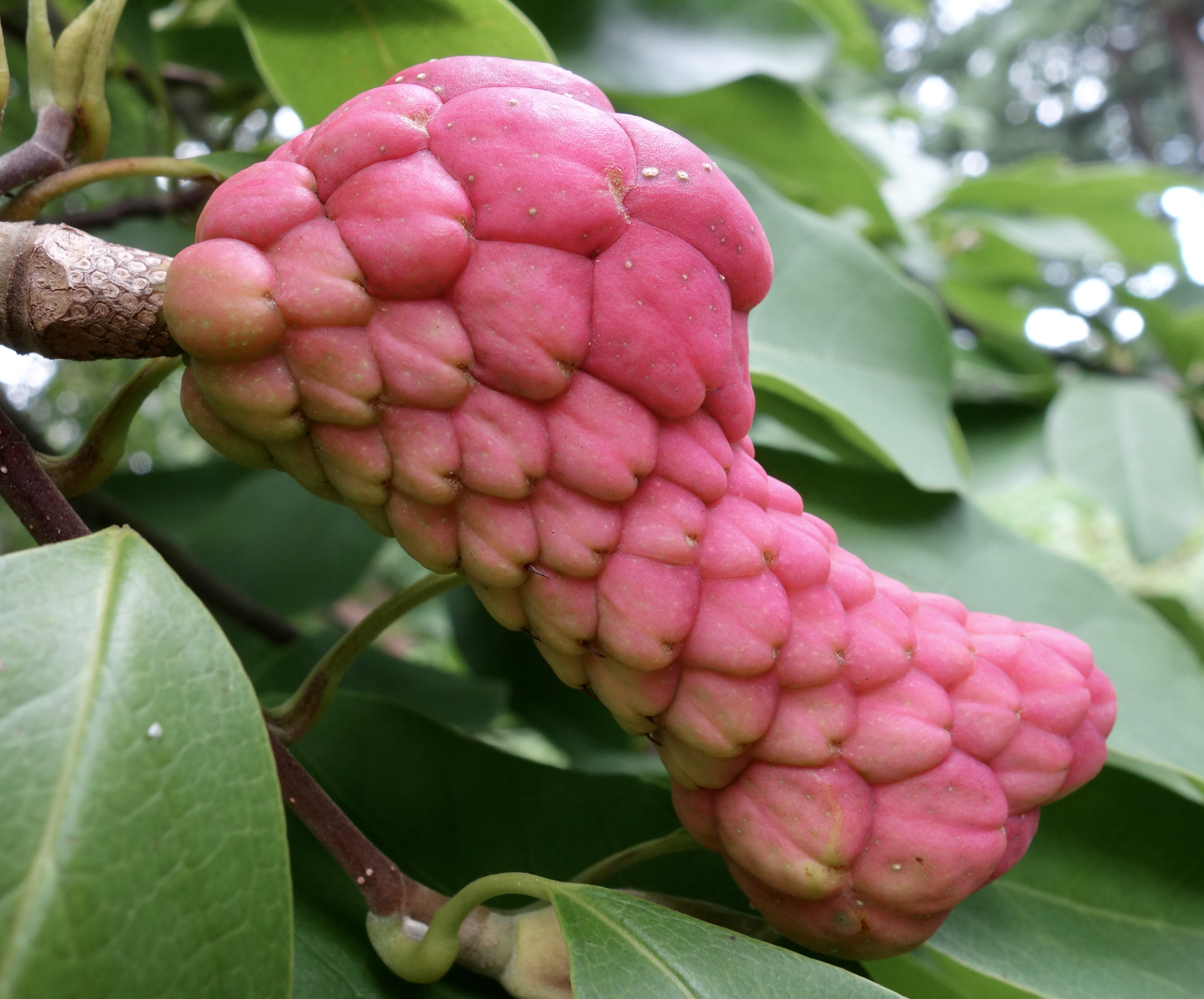
Maturing fruit
