= Yiyan Wang =

New Zealand Chinese academic

- Education: University of Sydney
- Scientific career
- Workplaces: Victoria University of Wellington
- Thesis: Narrating China : Defunct capital and the fictional world of Jia Pingwa (1999)

Yiyan Wang is a New Zealand based scholar of Chinese literature. She is a professor at the Victoria University of Wellington, where she is Director for Research and Postgraduate Studies in the School of Languages and Cultures.

== Academic career ==
After a 1999 PhD titled 'Narrating China : Defunct capital and the fictional world of Jia Pingwa' at the University of Sydney, Wang moved to the Victoria University of Wellington, rising to full professor in 2015.

Wang teaches both Chinese language and Chinese culture, but much of her research is on Chinese language fiction.

== Selected works ==
- Wang, Yiyan. "Shanghai Modernity: Women and the Practice of Everyday Life." Literature & Aesthetics 17, no. 1 (2011).
- Wang, Yiyan. Narrating China: Jia Pingwa and his fictional world. Routledge, 2006.
