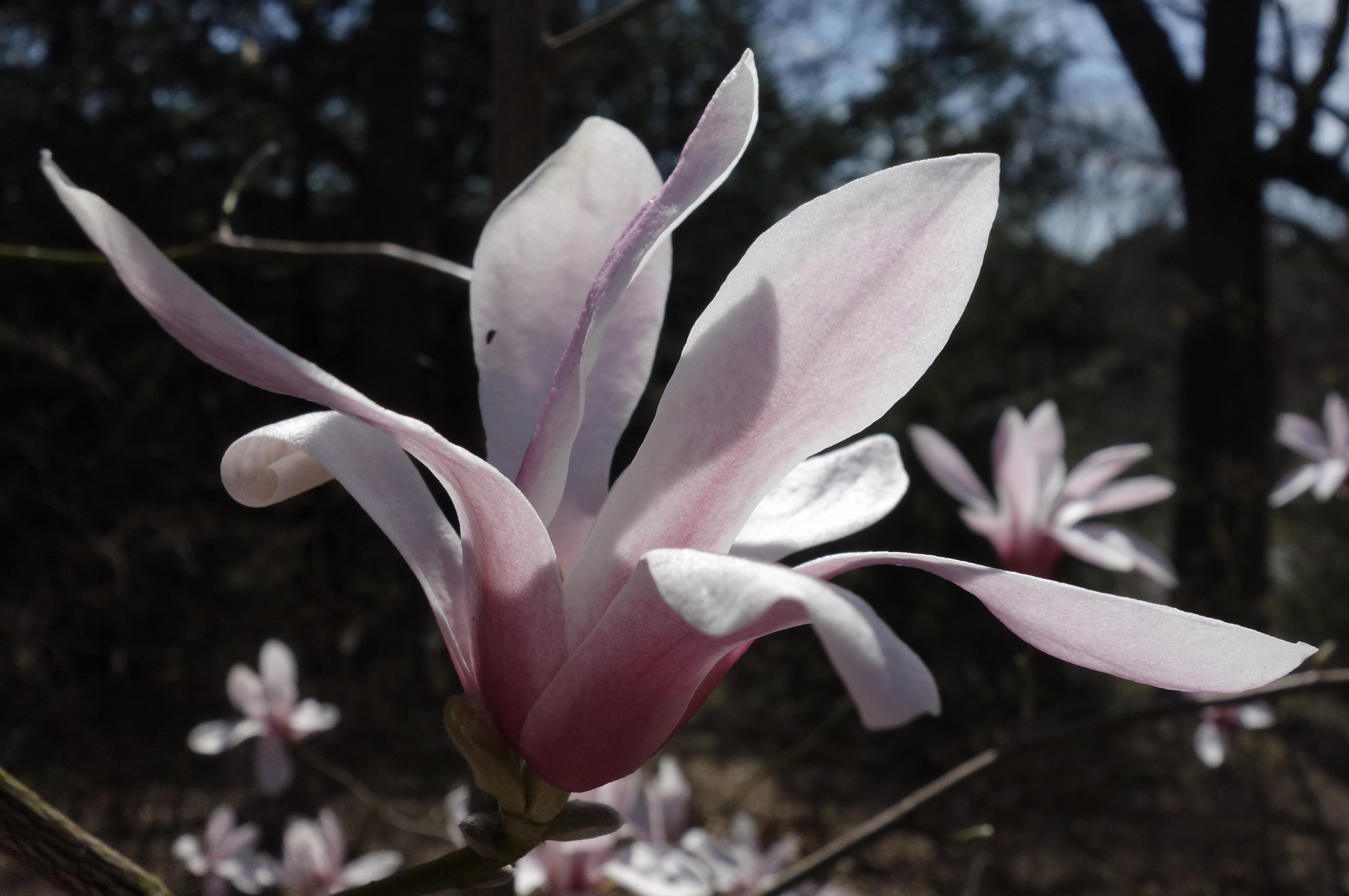
- Magnolia amoena, Arnold Arboretum of Harvard University, accession #385-2012*A

Conservation status
- Vulnerable (IUCN 3.1)

Scientific classification
- Kingdom: Plantae
- Clade: Embryophytes
- Clade: Tracheophytes
- Clade: Spermatophytes
- Clade: Angiosperms
- Clade: Magnoliids
- Order: Magnoliales
- Family: Magnoliaceae
- Genus: Magnolia
- Subgenus: Magnolia subg. Yulania
- Section: Magnolia sect. Yulania
- Subsection: Magnolia subsect. Yulania
- Species: M. amoena

Binomial name
- Magnolia amoena W.C.Cheng

Synonyms
- Magnolia amoena f. alba H.L.Lin & G.Y.Li; Magnolia amoena f. purpurascens F.Y.Zhang & X.Y.Ye; Yulania amoena (W.C.Cheng) D.L.Fu

= Magnolia amoena =

Tianmu magnolia

Species of flowering plant

Magnolia amoena (common name Tianmu magnolia, so called from Tianmu Mountain where it grows) is a species of plant in the family Magnoliaceae. It is a tree endemic to southern Anhui, southern Jiangsu, and Zhejiang in southeastern China. It is threatened by habitat loss.

== Gallery ==
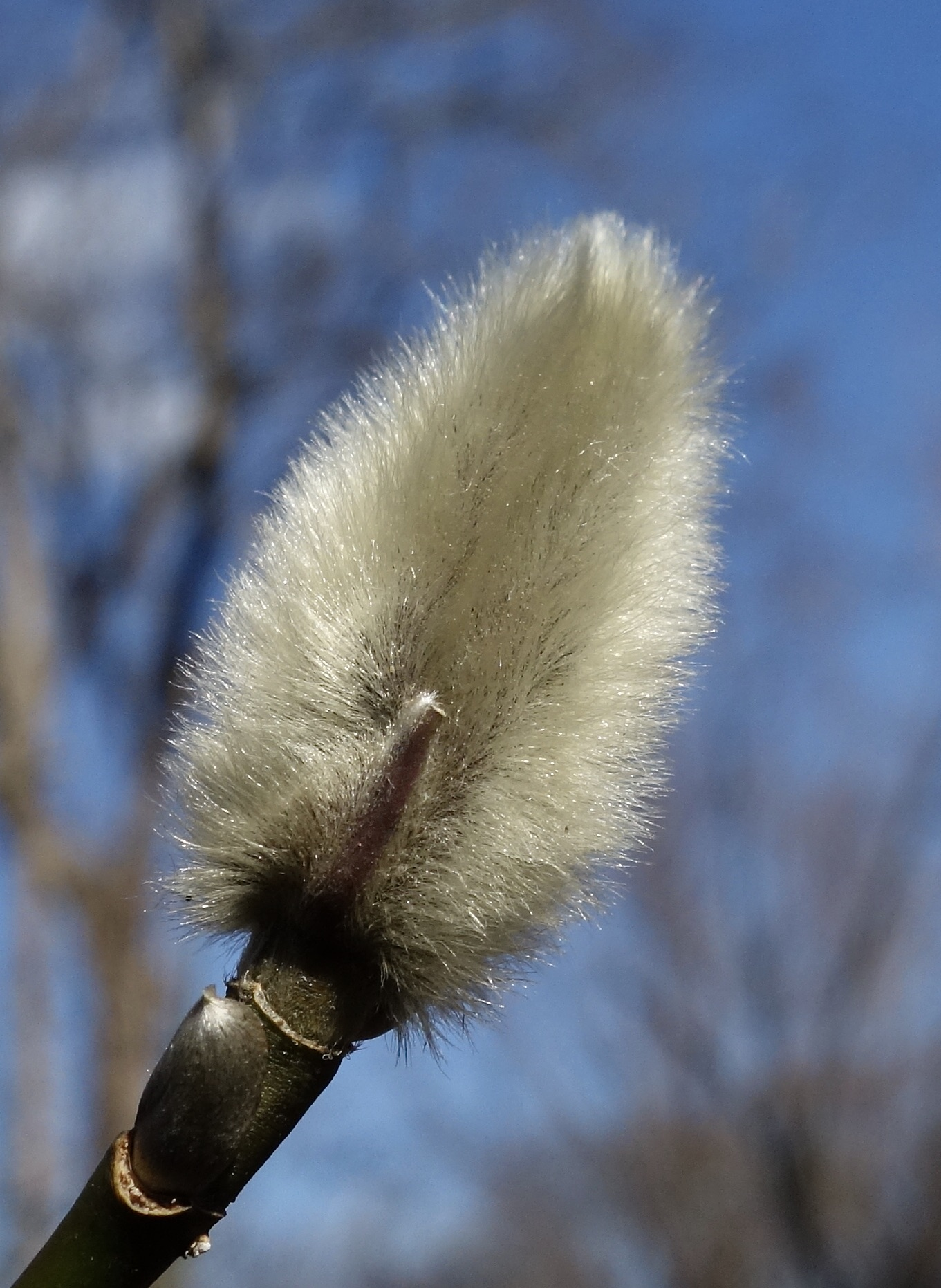
Bud

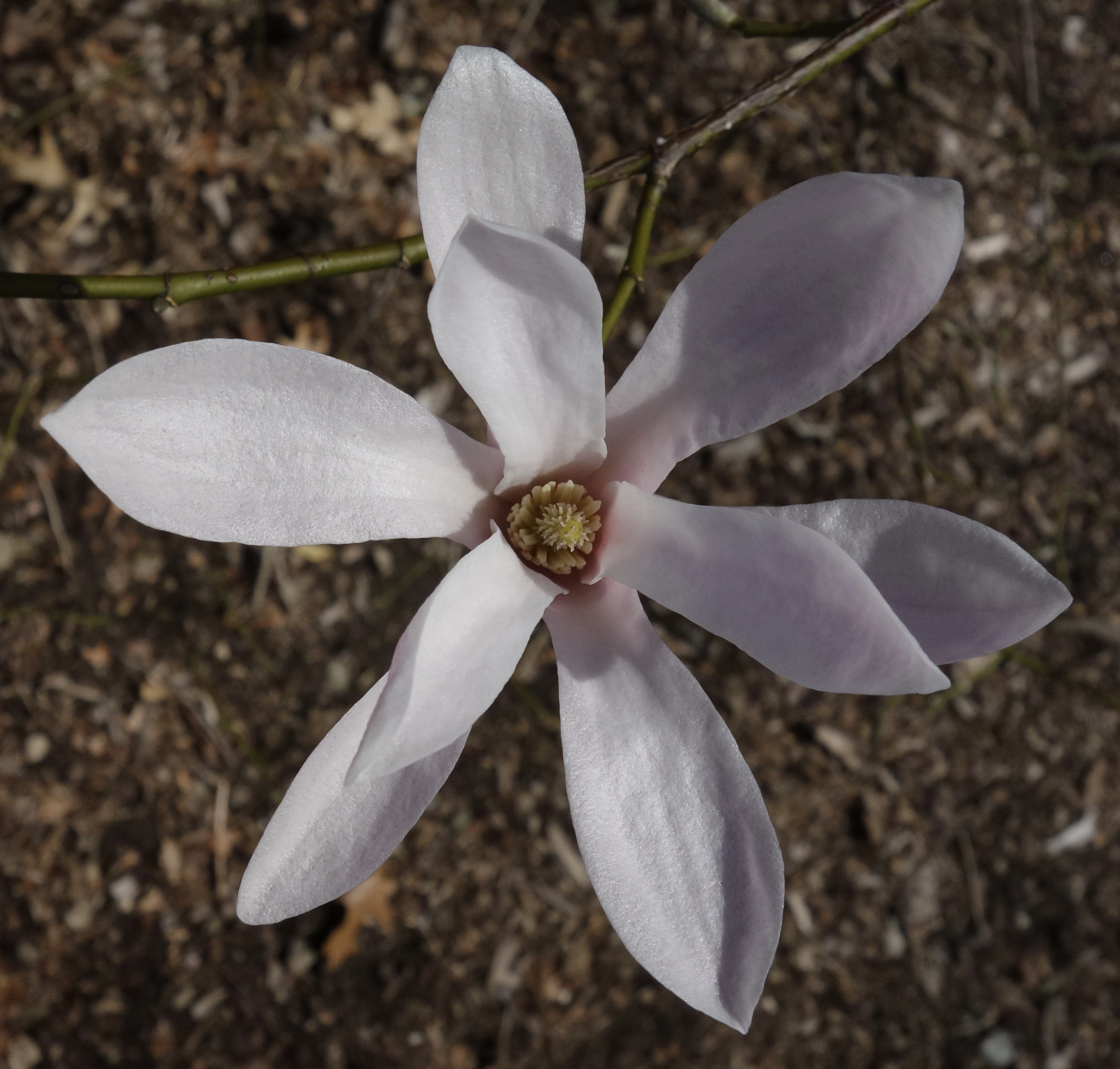
Flower

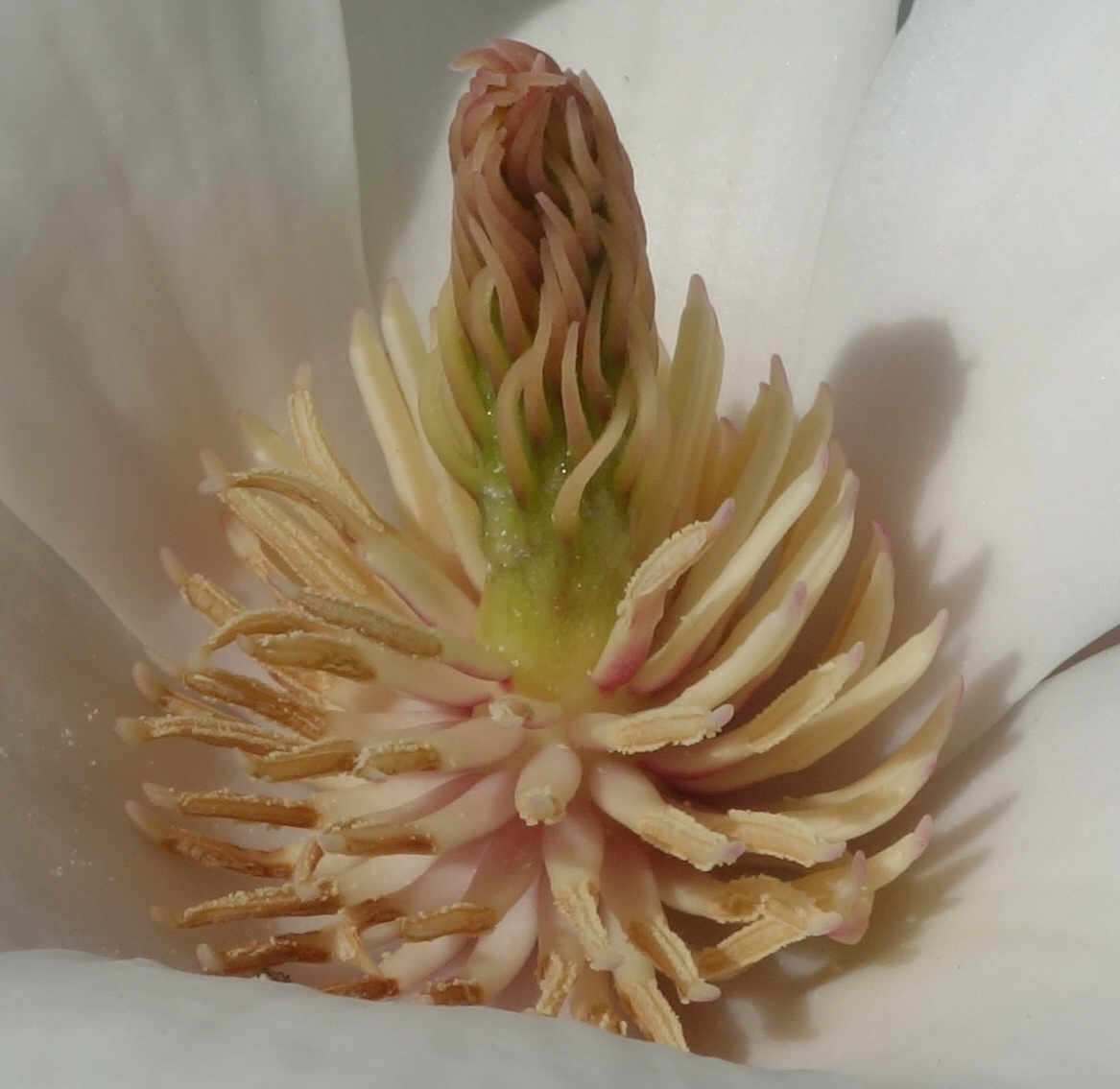
Flower detail
