= Shinkankakuha =

Japanese literary group

Shinkankakuha (Japanese: 新感覚派; kyūjitai: 新感覺派) was a pre-war Japanese literary group led by Riichi Yokomitsu and Yasunari Kawabata which focused on exploring "new impressions" or "new perceptions" in the writing of Japanese literature. Riichi Yokomitsu wrote "The phenomenon of perception for Shinkankakuha is, to put it briefly, the direct, intuitive sensation of a subjectivity that peels away the naturalized exterior aspects and leaps into the thing itself."

== History ==
After the 1923 Great Kantō earthquake and the deadly fire it caused, new technologies such as subway, airplane, and radio were transforming Japan. Meanwhile, a new conception of modern life also appeared. Shinkankakuha developed during this period as the start of Japan's modernist movement, influenced by European modernism. In order to oppose the literary mainstream, Kawabata, Yokomitsu, and other young writers started a new literary journal called The Literary Age (文藝時代; Bungei Jidai) in 1924, which was a medium of new movement in modern Japanese literature. Articles in this journal were mainly a reaction against the old school of Japanese literature; they also supported proletarian literature of the socialist/communist schools. The conceptions the writers had when they wrote articles for Bungei Jidai were known as Shinkankakuha. In other words, Shinkankakuha is a writing style. The Shinkankakuha writers were interested in film as a medium of new impressions and were involved in the production of Teinosuke Kinugasa's A Page of Madness (狂つた一頁; Kurutta Ichipeji), which was produced by the Shinkankakuha Eiga Dōmei.

== Related work ==
In 1924, the Japanese poet and translator Horiguchi Daigaku cited the work of the French novelist Paul Morand as a symbol of a new era. Instead of using rational logic to describe the relationship between things, Morand used the logic of senses. His work inspired many Japanese authors to begin writing in a new style, and prompted Yokomitsu and others to found Bungei Jidai.

== Critiques of Shinkankakuha ==
Kawabata struggled to define what "oldness" and "newness" were. Even though he noted Shinkankakuha was an integral part of creating "the new literature", the conception of "newness" was still unclear. Finally, he published an article in the fourth issue of Bungei Jidai stating that Western literature inspired a new writing style in Japanese literature, the so called "new literature".

== See also ==
- New Sensationists, a contemporaneous Chinese movement
- Riichi Yokomitsu
- Yasunari Kawabata
- 文藝時代
- 頭ならびに腹 - Yokomitsu Riichi's short story of Shinkankakuha
- 春は馬車に乗って - ditto
