= Aurora University (Shanghai) =

Former Jesuit university in China

Coordinates: 31.1419°N 121.4433°E

- Université l'Aurore
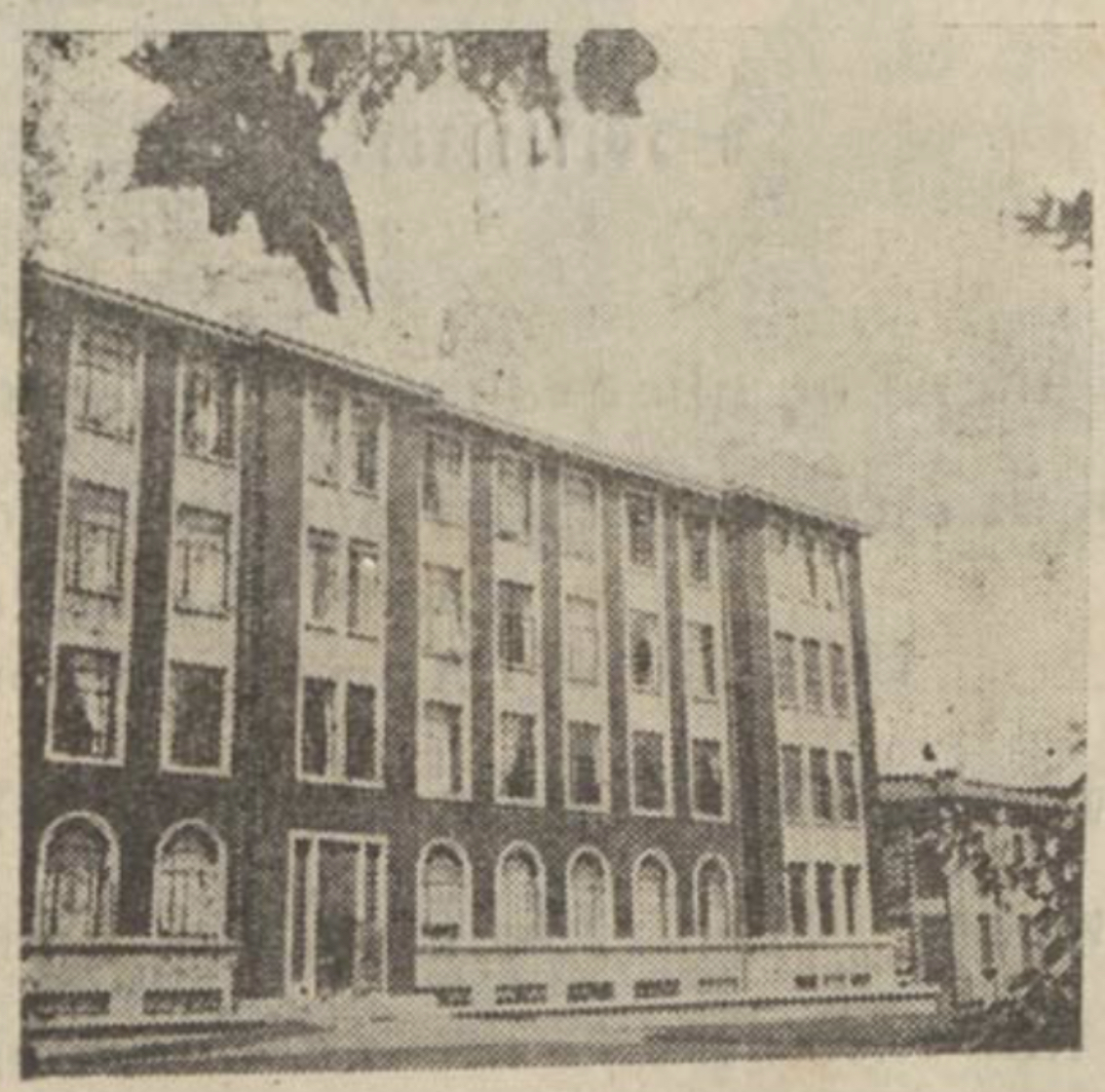
- Aurora University, circa 1940
- Other name: Zhendan University (震旦大學)
- Active: 1903–1952
- Founders: Ma Xiangbo, SJ
- Religious affiliation: (Jesuit)
- Location: Shanghai, China
- Language: Chinese

Aurora University

Chinese name
- Traditional Chinese: 震旦大學
- Simplified Chinese: 震旦大学
Transcriptions
Standard Mandarin
- Hanyu Pinyin: Zhèndàn Dàxué
- Wade–Giles: Chen4-tan4 Ta4-hsüeh2

French name
- French: Université l'Aurore

Aurora University (French: Université l'Aurore, Chinese: 震旦大學; pinyin: Zhèndàn Dàxué) was a Catholic university in Shanghai from 1903 to 1952. It was founded with funding from Ma Xiangbo, with the goal of developing translators capable of dialogue between traditional Chinese ideas and language and the ideas of Western modernity. It later expanded in its mission and by the 1940s was one of the largest of Shanghai's private universities.

== History ==
In 1903, Ma Xiangbo donated funds to found Aurora University (Zhendan Academy) under the auspices of French Jesuits. Its focus was to train translators to improve dialogue between traditional Chinese ideas and language and the ideas of Western modernity. Disagreements developed between Ma and the French Jesuits. They contended that Ma's pedagogical method and the resulting school atmosphere was chaotic. The vice director of the school sought to require top-down control of the curriculum and a French Université ethos. During the 1904-1905 academic year, the vice director alleged that Ma harbored revolutionaries at the university and abolished the student's self-governing body; Ma resigned.

Aurora was thereafter run by French Jesuits until the success of Communist Revolution. From 1908 onwards, it was located in Shanghai's French Concession.

After the May Fourth Movement rose up in 1919, some students from this university and other schools, including the Sino-French School of Shanghai and the Xu Jia Hui Catholic School, took part in "three-phase" anti-imperialist strikes – walkouts from workplaces, schools, and markets.

"By the 1940s, the institution had grown to become one of the largest, if not the largest, among Shanghai's private universities and included faculties of Law, Medicine, Sciences, Applied Sciences, and Literature, along with a Preparatory Course, Women's College, nursing program, dental training, a renowned natural sciences museum (Le Musée Heude), and a number of associated collèges and lycées in Shanghai and other cities throughout Jiangnan."

In 1952, Aurora University merged into East China Normal University and Fudan University, while the chemistry department was absorbed by the newly founded East China Institute of Chemical Technology and the medical school joined the Shanghai Second Medical College.

== Notable alumni and faculty ==
- Brother Octavius William Borrell, Marist brother who taught at the university and who studied the flora of Shanghai in the 1940s and 1990s.
- Yosef Tekoah, former president of the Ben-Gurion University of the Negev.
- Liu Na'ou, Taiwanese writer and filmmaker, studied there in 1926.

== See also ==
- List of Jesuit sites
