= Liu Na-ou =

Chinese novelist and filmmaker (1905–1940)

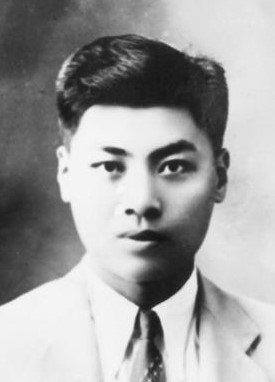
Portrait of Liu Na'ou.

Liu Na'ou (Chinese: 劉吶鷗; September 22, 1905 – September 3, 1940), born Liu Tsan-po (劉燦波) to a prominent family in Liouying, Tainan, Japanese Taiwan, was a novelist and filmmaker, active in Shanghai during the period of Second Sino-Japanese War. In September 1940, at the age of thirty-five, Liu Na'ou was assassinated while serving as the president of the newspaper Guomin Xinwen (National News) under Japanese-supported collaborationist government of Wang Jingwei.

== Style ==
Liu Na'ou studied in Taiwan and Tokyo, Japan, and eventually pursued a degree at Aurora University in Shanghai in 1926. His works encompassed various genres, including novels, essays, critiques, and translations, and his writing style aligned with the modernist approach. His representative work, the short story collection Urban Scenes, published in 1930, borrowed techniques from the Japanese Shinkankakuha (New Sensation) movement, depicting the passionate and chaotic lives of urban men and women. After Urban Scenes, Liu published three additional stories. A complete English translation of his short fiction was released in 2023. Liu's translations include a selection of Japanese short stories titled Erotic Culture and Vladimir Friche's The Sociology of Art. The films he produced were mainly of the softcore genre, and many are now considered lost. He also introduced the shooting technique known as "ciné œil".

Liu Na'ou's feelings towards Shanghai were complex, as revealed in his diary. On the one hand, he expressed his disdain for the debauchery and excesses of Shanghai, while on the other hand, he celebrated its enchantment. His diary from 1927, now preserved in the National Museum of Taiwan Literature, provides insights into his family, interests, reading habits, creative process, and social interactions. It stands as an important historical document for Taiwanese writers involved in the development of the Shinkankakuha movement in Shanghai, China.
