= Cui Hao (poet) =

Chinese Tang dynasty poet (c.704–754)

Cui Hao (simplified Chinese: 崔颢; traditional Chinese: 崔顥; pinyin: Cuī Hào; Wade–Giles: Ts'ui Hao, 704?–754) was a Chinese poet of the Tang dynasty in China and considered a main early exponent of the regulated verse form of Classical Chinese poetry (also known as jintishi).

== Biography ==
Cui Hao was born in Biànzhōu (汴州, present day Kaifeng, Henan) and passed the imperial examinations in 723. He is known to have traveled extensively as an official, particularly between the years 723–744. He was known for three poetry topic - women, frontier outposts, and natural scenery. His life was initially conventional; along with Wang Wei, he was one of the perfectors of the jintishi form. Later, however, he acquired a reputation for disreputable personal behaviour and passed through several marriages. His later verse is similarly unconstrained.

== Poems ==
Fifteen poems exist on the topic of women and fifteen poems exist on the latter two topics. A famous poem of his is the Yellow Crane Tower; which is one of the four of his poems included in the Three Hundred Tang Poems anthology, written in seven-character-per-line regulated verse, and which was later translated into English by Witter Bynner as "The Yellow Crane Terrace". Also included in the Three Hundred Tang Poems is a seven-character-per-line regular verse form poem written in the huaigu genre style on his passage through Huayin, north of Hua Shan, as well as two old or folk style pieces with erotic overtones.

== See also ==
- Poetry of Mao Zedong
- Yellow Crane Tower
