= List of Chinese poetry anthologies =

This is a list of Chinese poetry anthologies or collections, referring to those poetry anthologies which contain collections of poems written in Classical Chinese or Modern Chinese, and generally containing works by various authors, known or anonymous. In some cases, the anthologies are part of a lineage or tradition, building on the work of former collections. The "classic" collection was the Shijing ("Book of Songs", or "Odes"), traditionally believed to have been chosen by Confucius out of thousands gathered by royal order. The idea that the selection was based upon moral order became a strong influence on later anthologies. Similarly, the number 300, or 305, became canonical. Chinese literary tradition has long tradition of continuity, demonstrated in poetry anthologies.

This is a list of Chinese poetry anthologies. The list is variously sortable by clicking on the radio buttons (up-and-down arrows/triangles) in the column-headers.

| English version(s) title(s) | Original (or earliest known) title | Anthologist/editor(s) | Publication dynasty and dates | Collected poem era | Poem count | Alternative names | Comments |
|---|---|---|---|---|---|---|---|
| Classic of Poetry (Shijing) (Note: Many alternate title translations exist, many well-known. For example, Book of Songs and Book of Odes.) | 詩經 | Confucius (traditionally) | c. Before 6th century BCE | Pre-modern dynastic (11th to 7th centuries BCE) | 305 | Chinese: 诗经; pinyin: Shījīng; Wade–Giles: Shih^{1}-ching^{1} | Collected from various pre-unification states |
| Verses of Chu (Chu Ci) (Note: Alternate title translations include The Songs of the South.) | 楚辭 | Wang Yi (latest of modern version) | Han dynasty 206 BCE – 220 CE | Before 159 CE | See List of Chuci contents | simplified Chinese: 楚辞; pinyin: Chǔ Cí; Wade–Giles: Ch'u Tz'u; EFEO: Tch'ou-ts'eu | 17 sections. From ancient state of Chu, or imitations |
| Nineteen Old Poems | 古詩十九首 | anonymous | about 520 CE (Note: Publication date in Wen Xuan, attributed to Xiao Tong) | probably Han poetry and maybe Jian'an poetry or early Six Dynasties poetry | 19 | Chinese: 古诗十九首; pinyin: Gǔshī Shíjiǔ Shǒu | Gushi classic |
| Midnight Songs (or, Tzu-yeh Songs) | 子夜歌 | anonymous | 4th century CE | Six Dynasties poetry | ? | Chinese: 子夜歌; pinyin: zǐyè gē | Also known as "Tzu-yeh Songs". Traditionally attributed to "Lady Midnight" (子夜) |
| New Songs from the Jade Terrace | 玉臺新詠 | Xu Ling (徐陵, Xú Líng, 507 to 583) | Six Dynasties poetry (c. mid-6th century) | Six Dynasties poetry | ? | Chinese: 玉台新咏; pinyin: Yùtái Xīnyǒng | Term "Jade Terrace" refers to apartments of upper-class woman confinement. |
| Complete Tang Poems | 全唐詩 | Cao Yin (lead editor) | Commissioned 1705 (Qing dynasty) | Tang poetry, 618 to 907 | approx. 49,000 | Chinese: 全唐詩; pinyin: Quán Tángshī | Sponsored by the Kangxi Emperor |
| Three Hundred Tang Poems | 唐詩三百首 | Sun Zhu (1722–1778) (Note: Also known as Hengtang Tuishi (衡塘退士, "Retired Master of Hengtang")) | approx. 1763, Qing dynasty | Tang poetry, 618 to 907 | 305 (standard) | Chinese: 唐诗三百首; pinyin: Tángshī sānbái shǒuh | various editions published |
| Poems Composed at the Orchid Pavilion | 蘭亭集 | ? | 353 CE (Six Dynasties poetry) | 353 CE (Six Dynasties poetry) | ? | | Has famous preface ("Lantingji Xu") |
| The Columbia Anthology of Modern Chinese Literature | same | Joseph S. M. Lau/Howard Goldblatt | 1995 | Modern Chinese literature | ? | ? | published by Columbia University in New York City, New York, United States |

== See also ==
Category:Poetry-related lists

=== General ===
- Classical Chinese poetry
- Chinese art
- Shi (poetry) (the Chinese term for poetry)
- Chinese literature
- Chinese classic texts
- List of national poetries
- Modern Chinese poetry
- Category:Chinese translators

=== Poetry works and collections ===
- Category:Chinese poetry collections
- Gao Bing
- List of Chuci contents
- List of Three Hundred Tang Poems poets
- Orchid Pavilion Gathering
- Sunflower Splendor: Three Thousand Years of Chinese Poetry
- Wangchuan ji
- Yan Yu (poetry theorist)
