= Song Zhiwen =

Chinese poet

Chinese name
- Traditional Chinese: 宋之問
- Simplified Chinese: 宋之问
Transcriptions
Standard Mandarin
- Hanyu Pinyin: Sòng Zhīwèn
- Wade–Giles: Sung Chih-wên
Yue: Cantonese
- Jyutping: Sung^{3} Zi^{1}-man^{6}
Middle Chinese
- Middle Chinese: Suong^{C} Tśi-mjwən^{C}

Courtesy name: Yanqing
- Chinese: 延清
Transcriptions
Standard Mandarin
- Hanyu Pinyin: Yánqīng

Japanese name
- Kanji: 宋之問
- Hiragana: そうしもん
Transcriptions
- Romanization: Sō Shimon

Song Zhiwen (c. 660–712), also known by his courtesy name of Yanqing, was a Chinese poet of the early Tang dynasty, although technically his poetic career was largely within the anomalous dynastic interregnum of Wu Zetian. Together with Shen Quanqi, Song Zhiwen is considered to have the "credit for the final perfection" of the "new style" poetry of regulated verse (jintishi) which was one of the most critical poetic developments of the early Tang poets, and much followed as a style which inspired future generations of poets.

He was ordered to commit suicide after Emperor Xuanzong came to the throne, ostensibly because of his unwise involvement in the politics of the imperial succession.

== Poetry ==
Song Zhiwen was known for his five-character-regular-verse, or wujue, one of which is included in the anthology Three Hundred Tang Poems.

An outstanding poet of the imperial court, Song Zhiwen is known for his regulated verse, lüshi, including heptasyllabic songs. His early works focus on court life and imperially assigned poems. Later, he wrote about landscapes and his personal embitterment due to his exile. His most famous poems are "度大庾岭" (A.D.705) and "渡汉江" (Crossing the Han River, A.D.706). Actually, he rather creates court poems than other topics when he stays in the royal circle, while composing lyrics instead when he is banished from the capital.

== See also ==
- Classical Chinese poetry forms
- Regulated verse
- Lantian County
- Wangchuanji
