= Shen Quanqi =

Chinese poet and government official

Chinese name
- Chinese: 沈佺期
Transcriptions
Standard Mandarin
- Hanyu Pinyin: Shěn Quánqí
- Wade–Giles: Shên Ch'üan-ch'i
Yue: Cantonese
- Jyutping: Sam^{2} Tsyun^{4}kei^{4}
Middle Chinese
- Middle Chinese: Śyəm Dzjwän-gjɨ

Vietnamese name
- Vietnamese: Trầm Toàn Kỳ

Japanese name
- Hiragana: しん せんき
Transcriptions
- Romanization: Shin Senki

Shen Quanqi (Chinese: 沈佺期; Wade–Giles: Shên Ch'üan-ch'i; c. 650 – 729), also known as Yunqing (Chinese: 雲卿), was a Chinese poet and government official active during the Tang dynasty, and the interluding "restored Zhou dynasty" of Wu Zetian. Shen Quanqi is especially known for his work in developing and perfecting the regulated verse form of Classical Chinese poetry. Shen's poetry ranges from the elegant court style of the poetry which he wrote while at court and the intensely anguished poems which he wrote during his years of exile, in the extreme south of the empire.

== Life ==
He was born in the prefecture of Neihuang in the province of Xiangzhou, which is known today as the province of Henan.

In 675, Shen Quanqi obtained a magistrate degree. He then served several positions as a scholar at the imperial court, and was appointed by the government official Zhang Yizhi. However, the Wuzhou Dynasty was overthrown, and Zhang Yizhi was executed. Shen Quanqi was arrested and imprisoned on charges of bribery and corruption. He was then released, but sent in exile to Huanzhou of Annan Duhufu, which is known today as Vinh in Vietnam. In 706, he was pardoned, and recalled to resume his duties at the imperial court, where he eventually worked up to the position of imperial diarist and then grand secretary.

== Works ==
He made numerous contributions to Chinese poetry, including the Five-verse poems (五言律詩). He was also known to write together with poet Song Zhiwen, and the two were known as the "Shen-Song" (沈宋) pair.

Due to his exile to Annan (today known as Vietnam), he wrote numerous poems in the region. Many of his poems written there are some of the earliest literary works concerning Vietnam.

== See also ==
- Classical Chinese poetry forms
- Regulated verse
