= Huaigu =

Huaigu (traditional Chinese: 懷古; simplified Chinese: 怀古; pinyin: huáigǔ). is one of the Classical Chinese poetry genres. The huaigu is a type or style of poem, in which the poet looks back at some bygone time(s), place(s), or person(s), and the poem may be written in any of the Classical Chinese poetry forms. This is "one of the perennial themes of Chinese poetry," according to Burton Watson, in which "the poet contemplates the ruins of past glory."

== History ==
Wu Hung argues that, while no comprehensive history of the huaigu has been written, the development of the genre can be divided into at least four periods: (1) the emergence of its sensibility during the Han dynasty, (2) the formation of the poetic genre during the Cao Wei and Jin dynasties, (3) its popularity during the Tang dynasty, and (4) continuing imitation or proliferation in later periods.

== Examples ==
A good example of the many poets who wrote poems in this genre is Li Bo who was especially fond of this genre. A good example of a particular poem is the one translated by Witter Bynner as "I Pass Through the Lu Dukedom with a Sigh and a Sacrifice for Confucius", found in the famous poetry anthology Three Hundred Tang Poems, this poem was written in the Tang dynasty by Emperor Xuanzong, in the lushi form: it lamentingly refers to the philosopher-sage Confucius and to Confucius' home state of Lu, during the by then long-gone Spring and Autumn period, expressing sadness for what is past and beyond recall, thus reflecting on the transience of mortal existence.

== See also ==
- Classical Chinese poetry
- Classical Chinese poetry genres
