= Eight Poetic Portrayals of Taiwan's Famous Landscapes =

Genre of classical Chinese poetry in Taiwan

The Eight Poetic PortrayalsViews of Taiwan’s Famous Landscapes is a unique genre of classical Chinese poetry during the Qing period of Taiwan, primarily associated with the “Eight Landscapes of Taiwan” (Chinese: 臺灣八景). Most of these poems are written in the regulated verse (Chinese: 近體詩), with seven-character eight-line regulated verse (Chinese: 七言律詩) being the most common. Also, many authors of these poems did not personally visit the locations described, so these poems are not entirely factual and contain many imaginative elements.

The first of these eight poems initially appeared in the Records of Literature section of The Gazette of Taiwan Prefecture (《臺灣府志‧藝文志》), compiled by Kao Kung-Chien (Chinese: 高拱乾) during the Qing Dynasty. It included poems by five authors: Kao Kung-Chien, Chi Ti-Wu (Chinese: 齊體物), Wang Chang (Chinese: 王璋), Wang Shan-Tsung (Chinese: 王善宗), and Lin Ching-Wang (Chinese: 林慶旺). The main title of these poems is “Eight Landscapes of Taiwan” (Chinese: 臺灣八景), and includes “The Night Ferries of Anping Harbor (Chinese: 安平晚渡),” “Fishingboat Lights of Shakun (Chinese: 沙鯤漁火),” “Springtides at Luer (Chinese: 鹿耳春潮),” “Snow in Keelung (Chinese: 鷄籠積雪),” “Sunrise at Tungming (Chinese: 東溟曉日),” “Sunset at Hsiyu (Chinese: 西嶼落霞),” “Watch the Sea at Chengtai (Chinese: 澄臺觀海),” and “The Crashing Tides of Feiting (Chinese: 斐亭聽濤).” The geographical scope mainly covers Taiwan Prefecture (modern-day Tainan), so Taiwan actually means “Taiwanfu” (Taiwan Prefecture).

The selection of the Eight Poetic Portrayals of Taiwan’s Famous Landscapes during Qing period started in Tainan, where “Eight LandscapesViews of Taiwan” (Chinese: 臺灣八景) is located, and gradually moved north, and then east, eventually including government gardens. The naming and poem writing of the “Eight Landscapes of Taiwan” (Chinese: 臺灣八景) were mainly the work of literati and officials. The relationship between the “Eight Landscapes of Taiwan” (Chinese: 臺灣八景) and the Eight Poetic Portrayals of Taiwan’s Famous Landscapes is not absolute, and not every landscape had a corresponding poem. Subsequently, many literati followed the tradition of “Eight Landscapes of Taiwan” (Chinese: 臺灣八景) for their creative works, which gradually evolved into Eight Poetic Portrayals of Taiwan’s Famous Landscapes in various parts of Taiwan.

Scholar Shih Yi-lin (Chinese: 施懿琳), when analyzing the image of Taiwan in both scholar-officials (Chinese: 遊宦) and local poets during the Qing period, mentioned that the naming of the “Eight Landscapes of Taiwan” (Chinese: 臺灣八景) originated with scholar-officials who were away from home. She also noted that "Local literati who were familiar with the environment extended and further elaborated on this naming tradition,” making it more detailed and concrete.
