= Willis Barnstone Translation Prize =

American prize for translation into English

The Willis Barnstone Translation Prize is an annual award given to an exceptional translation of a poem from any language into English. The prize was inaugurated in 2002 by the University of Evansville, and has been presented annually since 2003. The award is given in honor of the distinguished poet and translator, Willis Barnstone, and Dr. Barnstone has served each year as the contest's final judge. The distinction comes with a cash prize of US$1,000, and the winning poem or poems are published in The Evansville Review. After the retirement of Dr. William Baer in 2015, Dr. Tiffany Griffith, professor at the University of Evansville, became the director of the competition.

== Winners ==
Year	Translator
2019	Robert Schechter and Edward Tick
2018	James Gregor (poet)
2017	Catherine Jagoe
2016	Rebekah Curry and Michele Herman
2015	Khrystyna Mykhailiuk and Spring Ulmer
2014	Michele Herman, A.M. Juster, Alfred Nicol, and Roger Sedarat
2013	Stephen Campiglio, Sara Noviċ, and Marci Vogel
2012	Ned Balbo and Philip White
2011	Alexandra Berlina and G.J. Racz
2010	Dan Veach and Brett Foster
2009	A. E. Stallings
2008	Maryann Corbett and John Richards
2007	Michael Palma and Scott Hightower
2006	Bradford Gray Telford, Geoffrey R. Waters, Ana Cara, and David Young
2005	Niloufar Talebi, Chana Bloch, and Chana Kronfeld
2004	Christopher Bakken and Roula Konsolaki
2003	Robert Mezey
2002	Marilyn Hacker and Ralph Angel
