= Hong Meng =

Chinese Daoist concept

Hong Meng, Hung Meng, or Hung Mung (simplified Chinese: 鸿蒙; traditional Chinese: 鴻蒙; pinyin: Hóngméng; Wade–Giles: Hung-meng), literally the Vast Mist, is a character in the Daoist text Zhuangzi and a metaphor for the "primordial world, primeval chaos" in Chinese creation myths. Like many Zhuangist names, Hong Meng is a word play, translated as "Mists-of-Chaos", "Vast Obscurity", "Big Concealment", "Vital Principle", "Natural Energy" and "Big Goose Dummy".

== Name ==
Hong, Yijing hexagram 4

Hong Meng compounds hong 鴻 "wild goose, swan; vast, great" and meng 蒙 "covered; ignorant (esp. in childhood), untutored; encounter, receive; (Yijing) Hexagram 4". The (ca. 111 CE) Hanshu biography of the Daoist author Yang Xiong writes Hong Meng as 鴻濛, with the variant Chinese character meng 濛 "mist, drizzling rain" (sharing the 氵 "water radical in hong 鴻). In Modern Standard Chinese usage, hongmeng 鴻蒙 is a literary metonym meaning "primordial world; primeval atmosphere of nature" before Pangu created the world.

== Zhuangzi ==
Hong Meng first appears in the (ca. 3rd century BCE) "Outer Chapters" of Zhuangzi (chapter 11, Zài Yòu 在宥) paired with Yun Jiang (simplified Chinese: 云将; traditional Chinese: 雲將; pinyin: Yúnjiàng; Wade–Giles: Yün-chiang). This character name combines yun 雲 "cloud, clouds" and jiang 將 "military commander, general officer; (Chinese chess) general corresponding to (chess) king". English translators of the Zhuangzi have rendered Yun Jiang and Hong Meng as:

- Frederic H. Balfour (1881:127) Spirit of the Clouds, Mists-of-Chaos
- James Legge (1891:300) Yün Kiang, Hung Mung
- Herbert Giles (1926:129) Spirit of the Clouds, Vital Principle
- Burton Watson (1968:120) Cloud Chief, Big Concealment
- Victor H. Mair (1994:97) Cloud General, Vast Obscurity
- Sam Hamill and Jerome P. Seaton (1998:76) Cloud General, Big Goose Dummy
- Wang Rongpei (1999:163) General Cloud, Natural Energy

Yun Jiang meets Hong Meng twice in three years, both times when wandering or traveling eastward. First, Yun Jiang was passing the fuyao zhi zhi 扶搖之枝 "branch(es) of a whirlwind". Watson (1968:121) notes fuyao 扶搖 "whirlwind; typhoon" appears in Zhuangzi chapter 1, but suggests this context is an error for fusang 扶桑 "a huge mythical tree in the eastern sea from whose branches the sun rises." Both interpretations are possible, compare "an offshoot of a whirlwind" (tr. Mair 1994:97) and "the branches of the sacred wood" (tr. Wang 1999:163). Second, they meet when Yun Jiang was passing the Song zhi ye 宋之野 "wilds of Song" (present day Henan), and respectfully addresses Hong Meng as tian 天 "heaven; heavenly master".

Cloud Chief was traveling east and had passed the branches of the Fu-yao when he suddenly came upon Big Concealment. Big Concealment at the moment was amusing himself by slapping his thighs and hopping around like a sparrow. When Cloud Chief saw this, he stopped in bewilderment, stood dead still in his tracks, and said, "Old gentleman, who are you? What is this you're doing?"

Big Concealment, without interrupting his thigh-slapping and sparrow-hopping, replied to Cloud Chief, "Amusing myself."

"I would like to ask a question," said Cloud Chief.

"Oh dear!" said Big Concealment, for the first time raising his head and looking at Cloud Chief.

"The breath of heaven is out of harmony, the breath of earth tangles and snarls," said Cloud Chief. "The six breaths do not blend properly, the four seasons do not stay in order. Now I would like to harmonize the essences of the six breaths in order to bring nourishment to all living creatures. How should I go about it?"

Big Concealment, still thigh-slapping and sparrow-hopping, shook his head. "I have no idea! I have no idea!"

So Cloud Chief got no answer. Three years later he was again traveling east and, as he passed the fields of Sung, happened upon Big Concealment once more. Cloud Chief, overjoyed, dashed forward and presented himself, saying, "Heavenly Master, have you forgotten me? Have you forgotten me?" Then he bowed his head twice and begged for some instruction from Big Concealment.

Big Concealment said, "Aimless wandering does not know what it seeks; demented drifting does not know where it goes. A wanderer, idle, unbound, I view the sights of Undeception. What more do I know?"

Cloud Chief said, "I too consider myself a demented drifter, but the people follow me wherever I go and I have no choice but to think of them. It is for their sake now that I beg one word of instruction!"

Big Concealment said, "If you confuse the constant strands of Heaven and violate the true form of things, then Dark Heaven will reach no fulfillment. Instead, the beasts will scatter from their herds, the birds will cry all night, disaster will come to the grass and trees, misfortune will reach even to the insects. Ah, this is the fault of men who 'govern'!"

"Then what should I do?" said Cloud Chief.

"Ah," said Big Concealment, "you are too far gone! Up, up, stir yourself and be off!"

Cloud Chief said, "Heavenly Master, it has been hard indeed for me to meet with you – I beg one word of instruction!"

"Well, then – mind-nourishment!" said Big Concealment. "You have only to rest in inaction and things will transform themselves. Smash your form and body, spit out hearing and eyesight, forget you are a thing among other things, and you may join in great unity with the deep and boundless. Undo the mind, slough off spirit, be blank and soulless, and the ten thousand things one by one will return to the root – return to the root and not know why. Dark and undifferentiated chaos – to the end of life none will depart from it. But if you try to know it, you have already departed from it. Do not ask what its name is, do not try to observe its form. Things will live naturally and of themselves."

Cloud Chief said, "The Heavenly Master has favored me with this Virtue, instructed me in this Silence. All my life I have been looking for it, and now at last I have it!" He bowed his head twice, stood up, took his leave, and went away. (tr. Watson 1968:120-123)

Watson (1968:120) notes that Hong Meng apparently represents "the Taoist Sage".

== Huainanzi ==
The (2nd century BCE) Huainanzi uses Hong Heng twice, translated as "primal chaos" and "Profound Mist", and both contexts echo the Zhuangzi. The "Activating the Genuine" (Chuzhen 俶真訓) chapter says,

In an age of Utmost Potency, [people] contentedly slept in boundless realms and moved [between] and lodged in indeterminate dwellings. They clasped Heaven and Earth and discarded the myriad things. They took primal chaos as their gnomon and floated freely in a limitless domain. (2, tr. Major et al. 2010:99)

And "Responses of the Way" (Daoying 道應訓) says,

One such as I – to the south, I wander to the wilderness of Wangliang [Penumbra]; to the north, I rest in the countryside of Chenmu [Sunken Tomb]; to the west, I go as far as the hamlet of Yaoming [Deep Obscurity]; to the east, I close myself up within Hongmeng [Profound Mist]. In such places, no Earth lies below; no Heaven spreads above. You listen but do not hear; you look but do not see. (12, tr. Major et al. 2010:471)
