= Wu-chi Liu =

Wu-chi Liu (traditional Chinese: 柳無忌; simplified Chinese: 柳无忌; pinyin: Liǔ Wújì; Wade–Giles: Liu^{3} Wu^{2}-chi^{4}; 1907 – October 3, 2002) was a scholar of Chinese literature and writer. His works include editing Sunflower Splendor: Three Thousand Years of Chinese Poetry, an anthology of translated Chinese poetry widely used in teaching.

== Biography ==
Wu-chi Liu was born in Shanghai, China in 1907. His father was Liu Yazi, a prominent literary leader and political activist. He moved to the United States in 1927, where he received a doctorate in English literature from Yale University in 1931. He returned to China in 1932 and taught at Nankai University, National Southwestern Associated University and National Central University (now Nanjing University), before again moving to the United States after World War II. In the United States, he taught Chinese literature, philosophy and drama at Rollins College, Yale University, the University of Pittsburgh and Indiana University Bloomington, where he was the first chairman of the East Asian Languages and Literature department. Wu-chi Liu died in Menlo Park, California, on October 3, 2002.

== Biography ==
Wu-chi Liu was born in Shanghai, China in 1907. His father was Liu Yazi, a prominent literary leader and political activist. He moved to the United States in 1927, where he received a doctorate in English literature from Yale University in 1931. He returned to China in 1932 and taught at Nankai University, National Southwestern Associated University and National Central University (now Nanjing University), before again moving to the United States after World War II. In the United States, he taught Chinese literature, philosophy and drama at Rollins College, Yale University, the University of Pittsburgh and Indiana University, where he was the first chairman of the East Asian Languages and Literature department. Wu-chi Liu died in Menlo Park, California, on October 3, 2002.

=== Early life and education ===
Wu-chi Liu was born into an intellectual family in Shanghai. His father, Liu Yazi, was a well-known poet and political activist who played a significant role in the early 20th-century Chinese literary and political movements. Growing up in such an environment, Wu-chi Liu developed a deep appreciation for literature and the arts from an early age.

In 1927, Liu moved to the United States to pursue higher education. He enrolled at Yale University, where he earned his doctorate in English literature in 1931. His time at Yale not only honed his literary skills but also exposed him to Western literary traditions, which would later influence his work in translating and interpreting Chinese literature for a Western audience.

=== Academic career in China ===
After completing his studies, Liu returned to China in 1932 and began his academic career. He taught at several prestigious institutions, including Nankai University, National Southwestern Associated University, and National Central University (now Nanjing University). During this period, Liu was actively involved in the academic and literary circles, contributing to the development of modern Chinese literature and literary criticism.

=== Return to the United States and later career ===
Following World War II, Liu moved back to the United States, where he continued his academic career. He held teaching positions at Rollins College, Yale University, the University of Pittsburgh, and Indiana University Bloomington. At Indiana University, he made significant contributions as the first chairman of the East Asian Languages and Literature department. His work there helped establish the department as a leading center for the study of East Asian languages and cultures.

Throughout his career, Liu was known for his dedication to promoting Chinese literature and culture in the West. He was a prolific writer and translator, and his works have been widely used in academic settings.

=== Personal life ===
Wu-chi Liu was known for his modest and approachable demeanor. Despite his numerous academic achievements, he remained deeply committed to his students and colleagues. His passion for Chinese literature and culture was evident not only in his scholarly work but also in his personal interactions.

Liu was married and had children, who have continued to honor his legacy by supporting various cultural and educational initiatives. His family remembers him as a loving and dedicated individual who balanced his professional and personal life with grace.

== Works ==
- A Short History of Confucian Philosophy, 1955
- Su Man-shu, 1972. (biography of Su Manshu)
- An Introduction to Chinese Literature. Greenwood Publishing Group, 1990. ISBN 9780313267031.
- Sunflower Splendor: Three Thousand Years of Chinese Poetry
