= Shen Yue =

Chinese poet, statesman, and historian (441–513)

- Traditional Chinese: 沈約
- Simplified Chinese: 沈约
Transcriptions
Standard Mandarin
- Hanyu Pinyin: Shěn Yuē
- Wade–Giles: Shen^{3} Yüeh^{1}
- IPA: [ʂə̀n ɥé]
Yue: Cantonese
- Yale Romanization: Sám Yeuk
- Jyutping: Sam2 Joek3
Southern Min
- Tâi-lô: Sím Iok

Shen Yue (traditional Chinese: 沈約; simplified Chinese: 沈约; 441 – 1 May 513), courtesy name Xiuwen (休文), was a Chinese historian, music theorist, poet, and politician born in Huzhou, Zhejiang. He was the grandson of the general, Shen Linzi and served emperors under the Liu Song dynasty, the Southern Qi dynasty (see Yongming poetry), and the Liang dynasty of the Southern Dynasties .

He was a prominent scholar of the Liang dynasty and the author of the Book of Song, an historical work covering the history of the previous Liu Song dynasty. He is probably best known as the originator of the first deliberately applied rules of tonal euphony (so called "four tones and eight defects" 四聲八病) in the history of Chinese prosody. He was also the leading scholar on the musical practices of his time and author of the essays on qilin and omenology.

== Poetry ==
Shen Yue was known for his love of poetry. For example, he wrote a set of poems, called by Burton Watson the Six Poems on Remembering, describing his beloved during six times of the day. The Six Poems on Remembering get fairly close to being specifically erotic, which is rather unusual for Classical Chinese verse (at least as it has been handed down). The verse on remembering her when she sleeps includes the lines:

...
undoing her sheer gown without waiting to be urged,
resting on the pillow till caresses find her.
Fearful that the one by her side is watching,
she blushes under the candle's glow.

== Contributions to literary theory ==
Shen Yue was one of the most import writers in terms of contributing to the ideas behind much of later Classical Chinese poetry.

=== Contributions to Regular Verse tonality theory ===
Shen Yue apparently was the initial developer of the theoretical basis for the development of tonality in relationship to regulated verse. This would become crucial to certain forms especially associated with poetry of the Tang dynasty, such as the lüshi (poetry).

=== Yuefu ===
Shen Yue is also credited with being the first to apply the term Yuefu in a generic sense to the Han dynasty ballad style poetry, as opposed to the earlier meaning of referring to the Yuefu, or the Han imperial Music Bureau

=== Book of Song ===
Shen Yue was largely responsible for writing and compiling the Book of Song, a history of the Liu Song dynasty. One of the most important sections of the Book is his Treatise on Music (volumes 19 to 22). However, contemporary historian Pei Ziye managed to distill the work into a more succinct version, Summary of Song (《宋略》); after reading Summary of Song, Shen was recorded to have said, "This is a standard which I cannot reach."

== Role in Xiao Baorong's death ==
After Xiao Yan ascended the throne as Emperor Wu of Liang on 30 April 502, he initially wanted to treat Xiao Baorong (the deposed Emperor He of Qi) well, by making Xiao Baorong Prince of Baling and then assigning him Nanhai Commandery as his fiefdom. However, Shen Yue advised, "Cao Cao once said: 'Do not endure genuine disaster in the pursuit of ethereal reputation.'" Upon hearing this, Emperor Wu ordered Xiao Baorong to be killed. Just before his death, Shen Yue fell gravely ill, and dreamt that Xiao Baorong used a sword to cut off his tongue. Shen consulted a shaman on the dream, and the shaman affirmed his dream. Shen then summoned priests and monks to do rituals to inform and appease Xiao Baorong's spirit that it was not his idea to persuade Xiao to relinquish the throne.

== See also ==
- Lüshi (poetry)
- Regulated verse
- Six Dynasties poetry
- Twenty-Four Histories
- Fan Yun, contemporary poet
