= Ana Cara =

American academic

- Occupations: Creolist; translator; professor
- Awards: Willis Barnstone Translation Prize (2007)

Academic background
- Education: Middlebury College (B.A.); University of Pennsylvania (M.A., Ph.D.)

Ana C. Cara is an Argentine creolist, translator, and Professor of Hispanic Studies at Oberlin College.

She graduated from Middlebury College with a Bachelor of Arts in 1972, from University of Pennsylvania with a Master of Arts in Folklore and Folklife in 1974, and with a Doctor of Philosophy in Folklore and Folklife in 1983. She was visiting scholar at University of California, Berkeley.

== Awards ==
- 2007 Willis Barnstone Translation Prize

== Works ==
- "The Poetics of Creole Talk: Toward an Aesthetic of Argentine Verbal Art", Journal of American Folklore, Volume 116, Number 459, Winter 2003, pp. 36–56
- Baron, Robert, Cara, Ana, "Introduction: Creolization and Folklore", Journal of American Folklore, 2003
