= Midnight Songs poetry =

Genre of Classical Chinese poetry

Midnight Songs poetry (Chinese: 子夜歌; pinyin: zǐyè gē), also Ziye Songs and Tzu-yeh Songs, refers both to a genre of poetry as well as to specifically collected poems under the same name, during the fourth century CE. This is of major significance within the Classical Chinese poetry tradition, finding such practitioners of the genre as Li Bai (also known as Li Bo or Li Po); as well as importantly influencing world poetry through translations, such as by David Hinton. The Midnight Songs have been much used as inspiration for later poetry.

== Poet(s) ==
Although, traditionally the original set of poems was considered to be composed by an eponymously named woman, Zi Ye ("Lady Midnight") living during the Jin Dynasty, in modern Jiangnan, it is more likely that the Midnight Songs are actually a collection of poems by various poets, and/or from the folk tradition.

== Poems ==
The poems are arranged into four sections for the four seasons: spring, summer, winter, and autumn. Thematically, they thus represent four views of the seasons. According to one count, there are 117 of the poems in the traditional collection. They are all considered to be in the yuefu form; however, they are also all five-character per line quatrains, created from two couplets each, similar to the jueju form of later popularity.

== See also ==
- Six dynasties poetry
- Classical Chinese poetry
- Classical Chinese poetry genres
