= Geoffrey R. Waters =

American poet

Geoffrey R Waters (1948–2007) was an American poet, and translator.

He served as a Field Artillery officer. He attended Austin High School in Texas and Central High School in Murfreesboro, Tennessee. He graduated from Vanderbilt University with a Bachelor of Arts degree in history and Chinese in 1970, and from Indiana University with an Master of Business Administration in finance in 1979, and a PhD in Classical Chinese in 1980. He was a senior vice president at a California bank. In May 2007 Geoffrey R Waters suffered a fatal heart attack. He lived in Glendale, California.

== Awards ==
- 2007 Willis Barnstone Translation Prize

== Works ==
- Three Elegies of Ch'u: an Introduction to the Traditional Interpretation of the Ch'u Tz'u, University of Wisconsin Press, 1985, ISBN 978-0-299-10030-8

=== Translations ===
- "Du Fu as Literary Critic: “Six Quatrains Written in Jest”", Cipher Journal,
- "Thinking of a Way Home: A Song"; "Sent to the Ch-an Master Wu-Hsiang", Sunflower splendor: three thousand years of Chinese poetry, Editors Wu-chi Liu, Irving Yucheng Lo, Indiana University Press, 1975, ISBN 978-0-253-35580-5
- White Crane: Love Songs of the Sixth Dalai Lama, White Pine, 2007, ISBN 978-1-893996-82-3
- The Song of Endless Sorrow Bo Juyi
- Broken Willow: the Complete Poems of Yu Xuanji (State University of New York Press).
