= Regulated verse =

Regulated verse – also known as Jintishi (traditional Chinese: 近體詩; simplified Chinese: 近体诗; pinyin: jìntǐshī; Wade–Giles: chin-t'i shih; lit. 'modern-form poetry') – is a development within Classical Chinese poetry of the shi main formal type. Regulated verse is one of the most important of all Classical Chinese poetry types. Although often regarded as a Tang dynasty innovation, the origin of regulated verse within the Classical Chinese poetic tradition is associated with Shen Yue (441–513), based on his "four tones and eight defects" (四聲八病) theory regarding tonality. There are three types of regulated verse: the eight-lined lüshi, the four-lined jueju, and the linked couplets of indeterminate length pailu. All regulated verse forms are rhymed on the even lines, with one rhyme being used throughout the poem. Also, and definitionally, the tonal profile of the poem is controlled (that is, "regulated"). Furthermore, semantic and tonal parallelism is generally required of certain interior couplets. During the Tang dynasty, the "Shen-Song" team of Shen Quanqi and Song Zhiwen greatly contributed to the development of this Classical Chinese verse form.

== Formal rules ==
Regulated verse consisting of the three jintishi or "new style poetry" forms of lushi, jueju, and pailu while retaining the basic characteristics that are distinguished from the gushi or "old style poetry" by the addition of several formal rules, most of which they share in common, but in some of which they differ. These rules include:

- Number of lines are limited to four for jueju, eight for lushi, and an unlimited, greater, even number for the pailu. In each case, the poem is arranged in paired lines in the form of couplets.
- Line lengths are all the same in terms of syllables or characters throughout any poem. Generally, the line length is fixed at five or seven characters per line; although, some poems have a six-character line length. The line length is also used to further classify the main three forms of regulated verse into subtypes.
- Rhyme is mandatory. Rhyme, or rime, is based on a sometimes somewhat technical rhyme scheme. The rhyme of a poem can be difficult to determine, especially for older poems as pronounced in modern versions of Chinese; however, even as early as the Tang dynasty, formal rhyme might be based upon authoritative references in a rime table or rime dictionary, rather than on actual vernacular speech. Generally level tones only rhyme with level tones, and non-level (or "deflected") tones only formally rhyme with other non-level tones. Also, the poem's first line may set the rhyme, more often in the seven-character form than the five-character.
- The pattern of tonality within the poem is regulated according to certain fixed patterns of alternating level and deflected tones. Although there is some question as to the status of tone in older forms of Chinese, in Middle Chinese (characteristic of the Chinese of the Sui dynasty, Tang dynasty, and Song dynasty), a four tones system developed. For regulated verse, the important distinction is between the level tone (píng 平, generally corresponding the modern Mandarin Chinese first and second tones) and the other three tones which are grouped in the category of deflected tones (zè 仄).
- Parallelism is a feature of regulated verse. The parallelism requirement means that the two parallel lines must match each word in each line with the word which is in the same position in the other line, the match can be in terms of grammatical function, comparison or contrast, phonology, among other considerations: the degree of parallelism can vary and the type of parallelism is crucial to the meaning of a well-written regulated verse poem. Phonological parallelism can include various considerations, including tonality. Grammatical function parallelism examples include matching colors, actions, numeric quantities, and so on. In the eight-line lushi form, which is composed of four couplets, the middle two couplets have internal parallelism; that is, the third and fourth lines are parallel with each other and the fifth and sixth lines are parallel with each other. The jueju is more flexible in terms of required parallelism, although it may be present. The pailu requires parallelism for all couplets except for the first and last pair.
- The caesura, or a pause between certain phrases within any given line is a standard feature of regulated verse, with the main rule being for a major caesura preceding the last three syllables within a line. Thus, in the six-line verse, the major caesura divides the line into two three-character halves. Furthermore, in the seven-character line, there is generally a minor caesura between the first and second pairs of characters.

== See also ==
- Classical Chinese poetry
- Classical Chinese poetry forms
- Du Fu
- Shen Quanqi
- Song Zhiwen
