= Spring Lament =

"Spring Lament" (春怨) is a five-word jueju (五言绝句) poem written by Jin Changxu (金昌绪) during the late Tang dynasty. This is historically the only poem attributed to him. It is a notable example of the genre as it clearly illustrates various important techniques associated with jueju. The poem is about a woman longing for her husband who is on a far away campaign in Liaoxi.

== Poem ==
Traditional Chinese

春怨

打起黃鶯兒
莫教枝上啼
啼時驚妾夢
不得到遼西

Simplified Chinese

春怨

打起黄莺儿
莫教枝上啼
啼时惊妾梦
不得到辽西

English translation

"Spring Lament"

Hit the yellow oriole perch,
Curb its singing on the branch.
The song broke my dream,
And kept me from Liaoxi!

== Critical analysis ==
The words and expressions in the poem are lively like that in folk songs and stitched tightly together, with the images one after another. The resulting four-line poem is a single cohesive unit which cannot be separated. In composing five-word jueju verse, there are two types. One type is "one line one concept" (一句一意). Du Fu was the master of this type, where each line can stand on its own. The other is "one poem one concept" (一篇一意), where every line is critical to the central vision presented by the poem.

Read as two couplets, the first couplet is about oriole songs. The second couplet turns the subject to the woman. This change in focus beginning with the third line is another "rule" for five-word jueju.

From another viewpoint, the central meaning of the poem is revealed layer by layer as each line is read. Each line raises a question which is answered in the next. That line in turn raises another question, and so on. This poetic technique is known as "sweep and renew" (扫处还生). As each line sweeps away a question, it presents a new one.

The first line raises the question "why hit the orioles' perch"? After all, it is a happy sign of spring. The second line answers to stop the singing. But that raises another question, why? Most people like the orioles' singing. The third line tells of the interrupted dream, but why is it important? The last line gives the final answer; she was going to see her husband in her now lost dream. Yet that final answer raises larger questions. What kind of quest sends her man so far away to Liaoxi, beginning of the Silk Road? what of the Emperor who sets such a quest? and what is the ultimate meaning of such a quest? The reader is left to ponder such questions.
