= Bradford Gray Telford =

American poet, and translator (born 1968)

Bradford Gray Telford (born 1968 El Paso, Texas) is an American poet and translator.

He was educated at Princeton University, Columbia University, and University of Houston, with a PhD. He is a Houston Writing Fellow at the University of Houston.

His work has appeared in Agni, BOMB, Bloom, Eclipse, Epicenter, Laurel Review, Lyric Review, McSweeney's, Pleiades, Ploughshares, Phantasmagoria, Diner, and American Literary Review, Yale Review, and Hayden's Ferry Review.

He was Poetry Editor for Gulf Coast: A Journal of Literature and Fine Art.

== Awards ==
- 2005 Anthony Hecht Poetry Prize
- 2007 Willis Barnstone Translation Prize
- Donald Justice Poetry Prize finalist
- Morton Marr Prize

== Works ==
- "The Gemstone Globe"; "Das Fugue der Kunst"
- "Melia azederach "; "The Conversation"
- Perfect Hurt, Waywiser, 2009

=== Translations ===
- "Today is Always Today", Dirty Goat 18, 2008
- The Story of My Voice Geneviève Huttin, Host, 2010

=== Essays ===
- "Milosz Is Watching You", Poetry Foundation, 7.26.06
