= Sunflower Splendor: Three Thousand Years of Chinese Poetry =

1975 poetry book edited by Wu-chi Liu

Sunflower Splendor: Three Thousand Years of Chinese Poetry is an anthology of around 1,000 Chinese poems translated into English, edited by Wu-chi Liu and Irving Yucheng Lo (traditional Chinese: 羅郁正; simplified Chinese: 罗郁正; pinyin: Luó Yùzhèng; Wade–Giles: Lo Yü-cheng) and published in 1975 by Anchor Press/Doubleday. Wu-chi Liu served as the anthology's senior editor. As of 2002, the book had been widely used in Asian literature studies. In 2002 Stacy Finz of the San Francisco Chronicle wrote that the book "was a best-seller".

Sinologists edited and translated the work, and according to Burton Raffel, reviewer for Books Abroad, the intended audience was for students of Chinese poetry at universities and high schools. Beth Upton, a book reviewer for the American Oriental Society, wrote that Sunflower Splendor "is obviously aimed at the intelligent amateur as well as the student and specialist."

A companion volume in the Chinese language, also co-edited by Wu-chi Liu and Irving Lo, was published. It is titled K'uei Yeh Chi (Chinese Language edition of Sunflower Splendor: Three Thousand Years of Chinese Poetry) (葵曄集: 歷代詩詞曲選集; 葵晔集: 历代诗词曲选集; Kuíyèjí: lìdài shīcí qǔ xuǎnjí; K'uei-yeh-chi: Li-tai shih tz'u ch'ü hsüan-chi) and was published in 1976 by Indiana University Press. The texts published in the Chinese language anthology do not always coincide with the ones used by the translators of the English anthology.

== Title ==
The title of the anthology originates from the poem "A letter from Li Po" by Conrad Aiken. The book uses a section of this poem as an epigraph. D. Holzman, a book reviewer for T'oung Pao, wrote that the choice of the title of the anthology was inappropriate because while, in 1978, sunflowers grew in Beijing and Chinese provinces in the late summer period, sunflowers had been introduced to China in a recent period and therefore sunflowers are rare in Chinese poetry except for the most recent poetry.

== Contents ==
The book includes around 1,000 poems, 88 pages of notes, and a bibliography. I. Y. Lo wrote the introduction, which discusses his view on the differences between Chinese poetry and Western poetry. The notes are about the backgrounds of collections and poets and they vary in length. The book includes author indexes, tunetitle indexes, and a table of dynasties. The book contains an index of authors and two appendices. The book has almost 100 pages of background information on poems and poets. The book includes introductory sections and bibliographies. The articles in the "Background on poets and poems" were contributed by the translators, and those articles and the bibliographies appended by the editors are in the end portion of the book.

Holzman wrote that "Professor Lo's insistence upon the differences between "Western" and Chinese poetry is salubrious: for the Western reader the differences are more important than the similarities." Raffel wrote that the introduction was "skimpy".

Upton wrote that "perhaps" the book's "greatest problem" results from the book catering to potential audiences. She states that the book does not provide phonological information even though it has "a brief assurance" that Chinese poetry uses "auditory devices" and that the "total absence of comment upon the phonological changes which have occurred in Chinese" during the time period of the poems covered in the anthology was "even more disturbing".

=== Poems ===
The book's poems are divided into six parts. No. 1 is the Zhou dynasty, No. 2 is the Han dynasty through Sui dynasty, No. 3 is the Tang dynasty, No. 4 is the Five Dynasties and the Song dynasty, No. 5 is the Yuan dynasty, and No. 6 is the Ming dynasty through the present. The time periods of the poems have a range of 3,000 years, with poems ranging from the Classic of Poetry (Shijing) to the poetry of Mao Zedong. The poems originate from 140 authors. The anthology was written to showcase all genres and periods. The genres include Ci, Qu, and Shi.

The editors had a preference for poems that had not been previously translated into English. For many of the poems these translations were the first time they had been translated into a Western language.

The collection sometimes chose lesser known works from famous Chinese poets instead of more well-known, typical poems featured in Chinese poetry collections. The lesser known poets chronicled in this work originated from several sources, including the 5th century, the 6th century, the early and late poetry of the Tang dynasty, many Shi poems from the Song dynasty, and Qu poems from periods after the Song dynasty. Most of the translations were commissioned, and therefore made for this book. Some of the translations are new translations of material that had previously been translated by other individuals.

The editors had each poem translation examined with the original text by three readers. Each poem includes a reference indicating the source of the poem, stated after the end of the poem. Upton wrote that "The sources cited tend also to be well-known and easily available editions as well". The book provides footnotes for some poems.

About one third of the verses in the story originate from the Tang dynasty, making it the most well-represented dynasty in the collection. The Tang poems include works from minor poets. Wayne Schliepp, a book reviewer for Pacific Affairs, wrote that this work makes up for the lack of Tang works in earlier anthologies. Schliepp wrote that despite the fact that the Yuan dynasty was a short period, it was "well represented" but instead of by classical meters it is by popular form. Schliepp stated that because, as of 1976 "sufficient qualities of Sung verse are just beginning to be produced" the Song dynasty "is still not adequately represented" despite "its years and volume of verse".

Du Fu is the individual with the largest quantity of poems in this book. The book has two times the number of Du Fu's poems compared to those of Li Bai (Li Bo), and four times the number of Du Fu poems compared to those of Wang Wei. Schliepp wrote that the number of Han Yu's poems "approaches the number of pages devoted to Tu Fu."

Holzman wrote that the anthology "gives such a broad view to the whole Chinese poetic tradition", which he describes as the "best part", and that it includes "so many poems" including "so many hitherto untranslated poems by so many poets, many of whom have been completely neglected by translators." Upton wrote that the inclusion of more obscure poems was a "refreshing feature", and she stated that the references to the translations are "one of the most laudable features of the book".

==== Translators ====
The book states that over fifty translators who were had contributed to this work and that they were "East Asian specialists on the faculty of American or Canadian colleges and universities, or younger scholars who have received many years of graduate training in the language." Holzman states that the book meant to say "specialists of East Asia" and that "the language" "is presumably Chinese, although nothing in the context, and in some of the translations, make [sic] this clear." Holzman wrote that "a good proportion" of the book's translations "seem to" originate from doctoral dissertations that had been written by graduate students who had attended universities in the United States. Holzman argued that because these students had "taken the time and the trouble to familiarize themselves with the lives and works of the poets whose poems they have translated" they "should be more likely to give us a feeling of what the poem is really about than a translator who approaches the poem as a disincarnated "verbal object"." Therefore he argues that the poems written by the students were "the most precious in the volume". Due to space limitations, the names of many translators are not included in this volume.

==== Analyses of the translations ====
G. W., a book reviewer for the Bulletin of the School of Oriental and African Studies, wrote that "on the whole the standard of readability is high" but that due to the large volume of poems and the multiple translators involved, "it is inevitable that the rate of success should vary." G. W. added that because most translators were scholars working in universities, "there is perhaps generally more accent on accuracy of detail than on poetic recreation".

Holzman stated that the best translations were poems from poets who were not as well known, including over 20 by Wen Tingyun, almost around 20 each by Huang Tingjian and Mei Yaochen, 11 Yuan Zhen poems, 10 each by Shen Yue and Han Yu, and poems from previously untranslated poets from the Ming dynasty and Qing dynasty. Holzman argued that the translations of the earliest poems "are straightforward enough and are generally in agreement with the standard translations of [Bernhard Karlgren] and [David Hawkes]."

However Holzman believed many translations of poems in other periods were difficult to understand and that he had to consult Chinese texts in order to understand the poems. He believed that some translators did not understand the original poems in Chinese and that Edward H. Schafer was the "worst offender". Holzman stated that some of the translation mistakes may have been deliberate, "although this is sometimes difficult to determine." According to Holzman, in some cases "translators constantly allow themselves word for word renderings that they must realize will be incomprehensible to the reader who knows no Chinese, and I suppose they do so because they think they are being terribly "poetic", in an Ezra Poundian way." Holzman stated that the "deliberate disregard for what the Chinese text is saying" in some translations is what "disfigures this collection most."

In regards to the translations Holzman argued that "Some of the translations are extremely good and most of them, even some of those containing whoppers, will be useful to sinologues: it is always interesting to see how others have understood these difficult texts, and [sic] always easier to correct them than to take the first plunge one's [sic] self." Holzman wrote that little of the poetry "gives pleasure simply as poetry" and that "too much of it seems more interested in being "poetry in its own right" than conveying the meaning of the original.

Raffel argued that the poems "cannot, for the most part, be read as poetry" and therefore, instead of the translations of poems that had been previously, the intended audience would find the prior translations preferable.

Schliepp wrote that the poems have "high standards of translation" but there are diction errors such as "distracting alliteration," pleonasm, lexical level clichés of verse translation, and obscurity not present in the original Chinese. He also stated that there were hackneyed participles and vague structures, both syntax errors. In addition he stated there were errors in rhythm, stating that "many" of the translators "tolerate gross awkwardness and the worse use an ugly telegram style which is less translating than glossing", and that "few" of the translators "seem to attempt control of their rhythms even informally". Schliepp stated that the "outstanding" exceptions to these issues were the translations of Xie Lingyun, Li He, Shen Yue, and Wen Tingyun. He added that the work of about twenty other translators, the majority of whom were under 40 years of age, was "sound" and that these translators "frequently achieve felicity".

In regards to new translations of previous work, Schliepp stated that he is favorable to their inclusion because they improve over old versions or "for comparison's sake", but he argued that "the necessity to re-translate certain standard pieces—indispensable to anthologies of this scope—give them considerable difficulties both as regards representation of the periods and quality of translations."

Upton stated that "predictably" there is a variation of quality in translation, and that "the only really annoying "mistakes" are those which appear to have been taken from earlier translators."

== Reception ==
David Lattimore wrote a review of this book for The New York Times Sunday Book Review Supplement. Due to the review, the book's first printing sold out within a period of several weeks. This review, printed on the first page of the supplement, was described by Holzman as "eulogistic". Raffel wrote that Sinologists had a positive reception to the book.

Holzman wrote that while the book has "a substantial amount of worthwhile translations and that it thus deserves serious consideration", he believed that it was "extremely uneven, perhaps even disappointing taken as a whole". Holzman concluded that "there is good work with the mediocre and the bad, and the very great number of first translations will make this book useful to all sinologues interested in Chinese poetry."

Raffel argued that "The editors of Sunflower Splendor, and all those who worked with them, have largely wasted their time and ours, and the publishers' money. They meant to do what they did, but what they did is not worth doing."
