= End-stopping =

Feature in poetry

An end-stopped line is a feature in poetry in which the syntactic unit (phrase, clause, or sentence) corresponds in length to the line. Its opposite is enjambment, where the sentence runs on into the next line. According to A. C. Bradley, "a line may be called 'end-stopped' when the sense, as well as the metre, would naturally make one pause at its close; 'run-on' when the mere sense would lead one to pass to the next line without any pause."

== See also ==
- enjambment
