= Yongwu shi =

Form of Chinese poetry

Yongwu shi (Chinese: 詠物詩, 'poetry on things') is a Chinese poetic form entailing the detailed description of things.

== History ==
The name of yongwu shi is inspired by the earlier term yongwu fu (Chinese: 詠物賦), meaning rhymed prose describing things. As this genre became established, it incorporated new forms, including shi. The form emerged as part of palace-style poetry during the late fifth and the sixth centuries CE, that is during the final three Southern dynasties (Qi, Liang and Chen).

According to Grace S. Fong, early yongwu poems

generally present a series of the attributes, striking effects, and unusual properties of the object celebrated, often in florid and ornate diction with appropriate use of set associations and poetic figures. Since the aim is display of wit and refinement, the majority of the poems are adroitly executed 'sensuous word-pictures' lacking any deeper emotional or intellectual significance that would truly involve the reader.

The form continued under the Tang dynasty, where yongwu shi became a major genre of court poetry. In this period, poets increasingly used objects as an opportunity to allegorise people and human experiences (building on earlier traditions of doing the same in yongwu fu. For example, it formed a major part of the oeuvre of Li Shangyin (c. 813–58), who has come to be seen as the pre-eminent late Tang poet. As translated by Stephen Owen, one of his poems, on hibiscus, runs

風露淒淒秋景繁
可憐榮落在朝昏
未央宮裏三千女
但保紅顏莫保恩

The wind and dew are dreary and chill, it is full in the autumn scene,
to be pitied, how it flowers and falls between dawn and dusk.
Inside Weiyang Palace are three thousand women
who keep only rosy complexions but do not keep favor.

Zinan Yan has suggested that 'in conventional studies of yongwu poetry, the object is often assumed unchanging and detached from the real world, with no engagement with issues other than the poet's sentiments. This assumption can lead to the rather bland conclusion that the object is merely a vehicle for the poet's feelings' but has argued that yongwu poetry actually evidences

a shifting process where the literati consistently endow the object with renewed interpretations, and the diversity of these intpretations often results from the engagements with material change, economic configuration, courtly obligation, literary complexity, social intercourse and the cultural life of the literati.

The Tang period also saw the emergence of yongwu ci, a song-form that was not associated with the expectations of ethical substance that shi bore. Yongwu shi continued to flourish through the Qing dynasty and beyond. The form was the topic of an imperially sanctioned anthology on 1707.
