= Edward Tick =

American psychotherapist and author

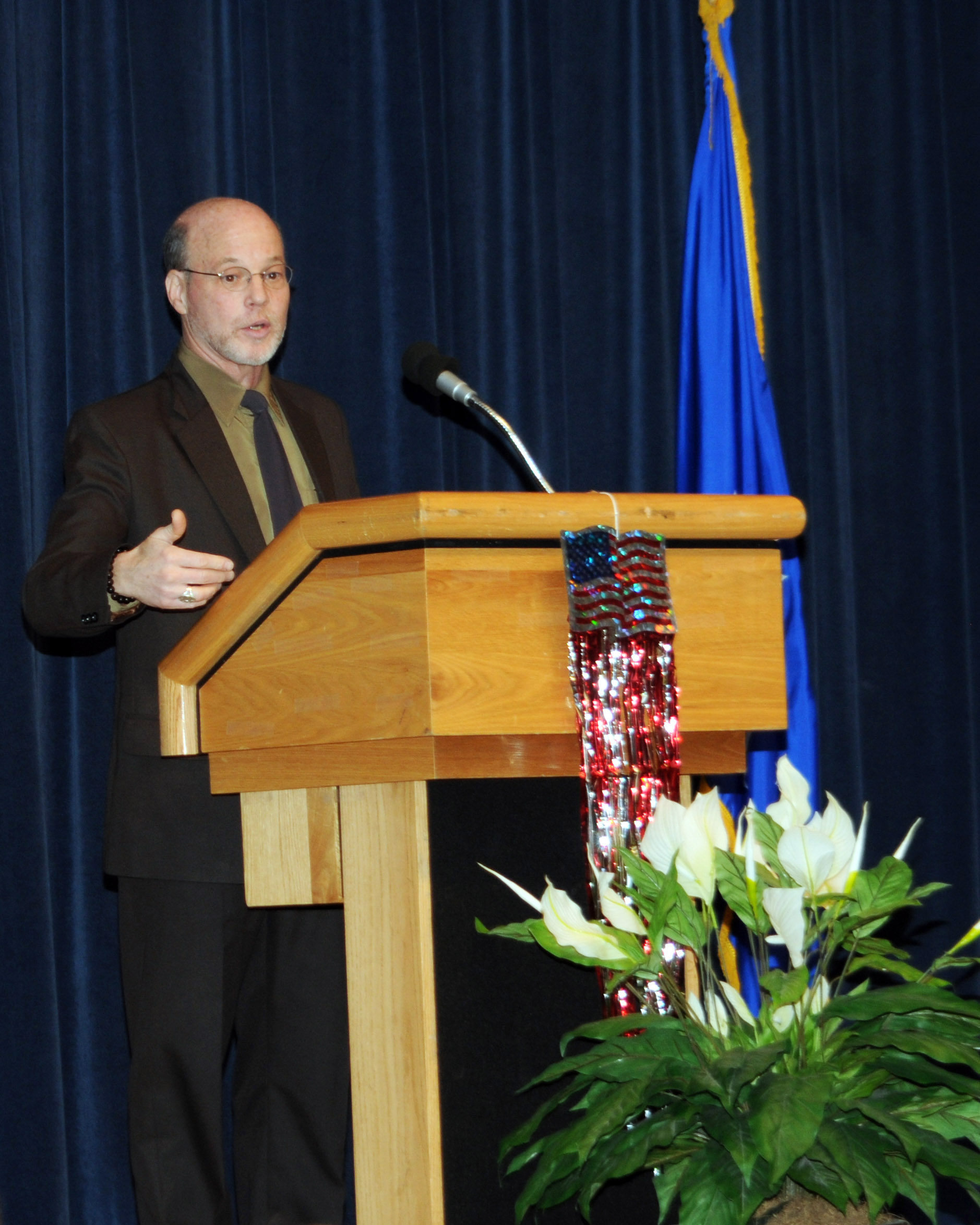
Edward Tick speaks at Altus Air Force Base in March 2011

Edward Tick (born April 24, 1951) is an American psychotherapist, author, poet and international pilgrimage guide. He is best known for his work on treating war mental health trauma and post traumatic stress disorder. Tick has been treating Vietnam war veterans since 1979 before the term PTSD came into use. Tick introduced the identity model approach to PTSD seeing it as a "soul wound", similar to moral injury, rather than primarily a medical or psychological condition. In 2012 Tick presented training on PTSD for 2,000 members of the United States Army Chaplain Corps. Tick was featured in "Forgiveness and Healing" episode of Link TV Global Spirit series.

== Education ==
Tick graduated with a BA degree in English from University at Albany in 1971 and an MS degree in Psychology from Goddard College in 1975. He received a PhD degree in Communication from Rensselaer Polytechnic Institute in 1981.

== Selected works ==
=== Books ===
- Coming Home in Viet Nam. Tia Chucha. 2021-10-15. ISBN 978-1-882688-60-9.
- Tick, Edward (2005). Golden Tortoise. Red Hen Press. ISBN 978-1-59709-008-7.
- Sacred Mountain Vol. 1: Encounters with the Vietnam Beast, 1979-1984. Moon Bear Press. 1989. ISBN 0944164005.
- The Practice of Dream Healing: Bringing Ancient Greek Mysteries Into Modern Medicine. Quest Books. 2001. ISBN 9780835607995.
- War and the Soul: Healing Our Nation's Veterans from Post-traumatic Stress Disorder. Quest Books. 2005. ISBN 083560831X.
- Warrior's Return: Restoring the Soul after War. Sounds True. 2014. ISBN 978-1622032006.

=== Articles ===
- Tick, Edward (January 13, 1985). "Apocalypse Continued". The New York Times.
