= Shi (poetry) =

Chinese term

Shī (詩)
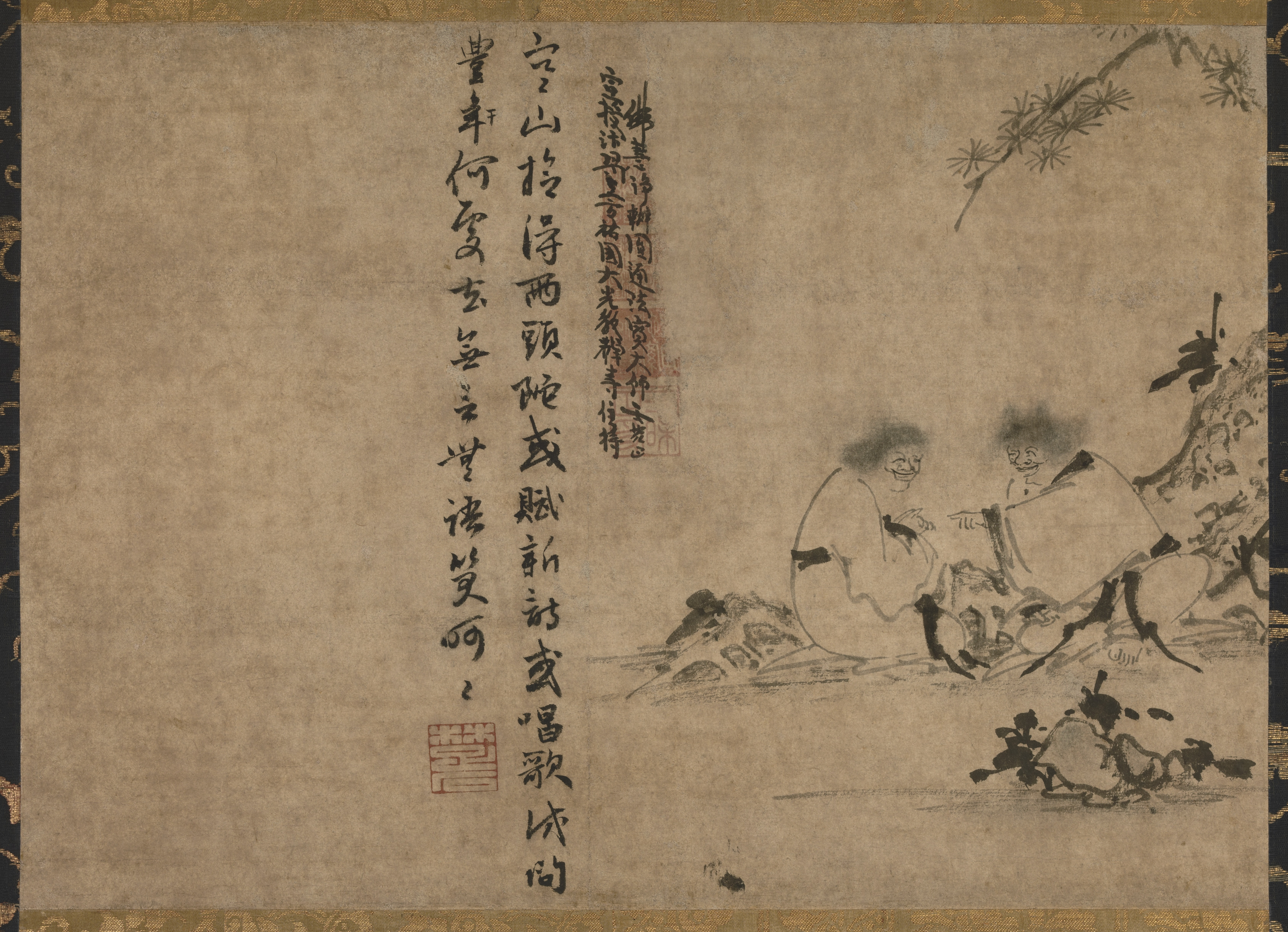
- Traditional Chinese: 詩
- Simplified Chinese: 诗
- Literal meaning: poetry
Transcriptions
Standard Mandarin
- Hanyu Pinyin: shī
- Wade–Giles: shih

Gushi
- Traditional Chinese: 古詩
- Simplified Chinese: 古诗
- Literal meaning: ancient poetry
Transcriptions
Standard Mandarin
- Hanyu Pinyin: gǔshī
- Wade–Giles: ku-shih

Jintishi
- Traditional Chinese: 近體詩
- Simplified Chinese: 近体诗
- Literal meaning: modern poetry
Transcriptions
Standard Mandarin
- Hanyu Pinyin: jìntǐshī
- Wade–Giles: chin-t'i shih

Shi and shih are romanizations of the character 詩/诗, the Chinese word for all poetry generally and across all languages.

In Western analysis of the styles of Chinese poetry, shi is also used as a term of art for a specific poetic tradition, modeled after the Old Chinese works collected in the Confucian Classic of Poetry. This anthology included both aristocratic poems (the "Hymns" and "Eulogies") and more rustic works believed to have derived from Huaxia folk songs (the "Odes"). They are composed in ancient Chinese, mostly in four-character lines. In such analysis, "shi" poetry is contrasted with other forms such as the Chu-derived "cí" and the Han-era "fu". This use is not common within Chinese literature, however, which instead classifies these poems into other categories such as classical Chinese poetry, Fields and Gardens poetry, and "curtailed" poetry.

== Forms ==
=== Gushi ===
Gushi
- Large seal character for shi ("poetry")
- Traditional Chinese: 古詩
- Simplified Chinese: 古诗
- Hanyu Pinyin: gǔshī
- Wade–Giles: ku-shih

Gushi, which means "Ancient Poetry", may be used in either of two senses. It may be used broadly to refer to the ancient poetry of China, chiefly the mostly anonymous works collected in the Confucian Classic of Poetry, the separate tradition exemplified by Qu Yuan and Song Yu's Songs of Chu, and the works collected by the Han "Music Bureau".

It may also be used strictly to refer to poems in the styles of the Confucian classic, regardless of their time of composition. Owing to the variety of pieces included in the Classic, there are few formal constraints apart from line length (usually four characters and no more than seven) and rhyming every other line.

=== Jintishi ===
Jintishi, which means "Modern Poetry", was actually composed from the 5th century onwards and is considered to have been fully developed by the early Tang dynasty. The works were principally written in five- and seven-character lines and involve constrained tone patterns, intended to balance the four tones of Middle Chinese within each couplet. The principal forms are the four-line jueju, the eight-line lüshi, and the unlimited pailü. In addition to the tonal patterns, lüshi and pailü were usually understood to further require parallelism in their interior couplets: a theme developed in one couplet would be contrasted in the following one, usually by means of the same parts of speech.

== See also ==
- Jueju
- Lüshi
- Yongwu shi
- Gushi (in Chinese)
- Classical Chinese poetry forms
- Classical Chinese poetry genres
- List of Chinese-language poets
