= Jerome P. Seaton =

American educator and translator

Jerome Potter Seaton
- Born: March 23, 1941 (age 85); Lafayette, Indiana, U.S.
- Education: Indiana University Bloomington
- Occupation: Professor/Translator
- Notable work: The Shambhala Anthology of Chinese Poetry; Cold Mountain Poems: Zen Poems of Han Shan, Shih Te, and Wang Fan-Chih

J.P. Seaton (born 1941) is an American educator and translator. He is a Professor Emeritus of Chinese and Asian studies at the University of North Carolina at Chapel Hill and is well known as a translator of classical Chinese poetry. His translations have been widely anthologized.

The University of North Carolina at Chapel Hill Curriculum in Asian Studies and the Curriculum in Comparative Studies, along with the Ackland Art Museum, the Carolina Asia Center, the Japan Foundation, and a number of other sponsors, presented a campus-wide series of events in November 2003 on “The Aesthetics of Nirvana: Truth, Beauty and Enlightenment in Japanese Buddhism.” in honor of his career at the university.

See also Seaton's books held in WorldCat libraries.

Additionally, selections of Seaton's translations have been issued in special editions by Longhouse Press including “Thirty Years to Instant Enlightenment”.

As an advisory editor of The Literary Review, published by Fairleigh Dickinson University, for many years, Seaton edited a large selection of Chinese poetry in translation in 1989, and another selection in the Review in a later issue, Nine Chapbooks, Summer 2008, Volume 51, Number 4.

He graduated from West Lafayette High School in 1959. He attended Wabash College and Indiana University Bloomington, where he graduated with a bachelor of arts in history in 1963.

== Books ==
- Cold Mountain (Graphic Novel) (Shambhala, 2015) ISBN 9781611801798
- Cold Mountain Poems: Zen Poems of Han Shan, Shih Te, and Wang Fan-chih (Shambhala, 2009) ISBN 9781590309056 (Shambhala Pocket Library edition 2019) ISBN 9781611806984
- The Poetry of Zen (Shambhala, 2007) with Sam Hamill ISBN 9781590304259
- The Shambhala Anthology of Chinese Poetry (Shambhala, 2006) editor and translator with Sam Hamill ISBN 9781570628627
- The Essential Chuang Tzu (Shambhala, 1999) with Sam Hamill ISBN 9781570623363
- Love and Time (Copper Canyon, 1989) ISBN 978-1556590245
- 300 Tang Poems (White Pine Press, 2011) with Geoffrey Waters and Michael Farman ISBN 978-1935210269
- The Clouds Should Know Me By Now: Buddhist Poet Monks of China (Shambhala, 2005) with Red Pine, Mike O’Connor, James Sanford and others. ISBN 9780861711437
- Wine Of Endless Life: Taoist Drinking Songs from the Yuan Dynasty (White Pine Press, 1978) ISBN 0-934834-59-8
- Bright Moon, Perching Bird (Wesleyan, 1987) with James Cryer ISBN 9780819511447
- I Don't Bow to Buddhas: Selected Poems of Yuan Mei (Copper Canyon, 1996) ISBN 1556591209
- View from Cold Mountain: Poems of Han-Shan and Shih-Te (White Pine Press, 1982) with James Stanford and others ISBN 9780934834261
- Bright Moon, White Clouds: Poems of Li Po (Shambhala, 2012) ISBN 9781590307465
- A Drifting Boat: Chinese Zen Poetry (White Pine Press, 1994) with Dennis Maloney ISBN 9781877727375
- Lao Tzu: Tao Te Ching (Shambhala, 1997) with Ursula Le Guin ISBN 978-1570623950
- Kʻuei hsing: A repository of Asian literature in translation (Indiana University, 1974) with Liu Wu-chi and others ISBN 978-0253391018
