= Gushi (poetry) =

One of the main poetry forms defined in Classical Chinese poetry

- Large seal character for shi ("poetry")
- Traditional Chinese: 古詩
- Simplified Chinese: 古诗
- Hanyu Pinyin: gǔshī
- Wade–Giles: ku-shih

Alternative Chinese name
- Traditional Chinese: 古體詩
- Simplified Chinese: 古体诗
- Hanyu Pinyin: gǔtǐshī

Gushi (traditional Chinese: 古詩; simplified Chinese: 古诗; pinyin: gǔshī; Wade–Giles: ku-shih), is one of the main poetry forms defined in Classical Chinese poetry, literally meaning "old (or ancient) poetry" or "old (or ancient) style poetry": gushi is a technical term for certain historically exemplary poems, together with later poetry composed in this formal style.

== Poetic form ==
The normal formal style is for uniform line lengths of 5 or 7 syllables (or characters), with lines in syntactically paired couplets. Parallelism emphasizing thesis or antithesis is frequently found but is not an obligatory feature. Rhymes generally occur at the ends of couplets, the actual rhyme sound sometimes changing through the course of the poem. Caesura usually occurs as a major feature before the last 3 syllables in any line, with the 7 syllable lines also often having a minor caesura in between the first two pairs of syllables. The final 3 syllables in a line are often varied syntactically by whether the first and second of these are more closely linked by the syntax or whether the second and third are more syntactically connected: a feature of the gushi form which provides added poetic interest and variety.

== History ==
Gushi poems first really began to emerge as a poetic form in the second century CE. In its subsequent history, a revival during the Tang dynasty produced an additional period of flourishing for this form of poetry.

=== Nineteen Old Poems ===
Gushi began their historical prominence with the Nineteen Old Poems (literally, "Nineteen Gushi"), which seem to date to the Han dynasty, from about this time period. These nineteen poems are generally characterized as rhymed verse, in the five-character line, unregulated style.

=== Tang dynasty revival ===
The gushi style experienced a great revival during the Tang dynasty, during which one of the poets particularly associated with masterful use of this style was Li Bai. In the Tang dynasty, with the development of the new style poetry (jintishi), also known as regulated verse, the term gushi was applied to poetry which did not necessarily keep under restriction the length of the poem nor to fulfill requirements for verbal or tonal parallelisms: in the freer gushi form of verse, often various rules were pointedly violated, such as by the use of unusual rhyme schemes or conspicuous avoidance of verbal parallelism.

== See also ==
- Classical Chinese poetry
- Classical Chinese poetry forms
- Li Bai
- Regulated verse
