= Classical Chinese poetry forms =

Poet on a Mountaintop by Shen Zhou, c. 1500 CE (Ming dynasty).

Classical Chinese poetry forms are poetry forms or modes which typify the traditional Chinese poems written in Literary Chinese or Classical Chinese. Classical Chinese poetry has various characteristic forms, some attested to as early as the publication of the Classic of Poetry, dating from a traditionally, and roughly, estimated time of around 11th–7th century BCE. The term "forms" refers to various formal and technical aspects applied to poems: this includes such poetic characteristics as meter (such as, line length and number of lines), rhythm (for example, presence of caesuras, end-stopping, and tone contour), and other considerations such as vocabulary and style. These forms and modes are generally, but not invariably, independent of the Classical Chinese poetry genres. Many or most of these were developed by the time of the Tang dynasty, and the use and development of Classical Chinese poetry and genres actively continued up until the May Fourth Movement, and still continues even today in the 21st century.

== History ==
Gao Bing wrote the Graded Compendium of Tang Poetry (Tangshi Pinhui), which is the first work using prosodic principles in a systematic method to classify poetry by Classical Chinese poetry forms. This built upon an extensive but less systematic approach; for example, by Yan Yu.

== Formal elements ==
There are various formal elements of Classical Chinese verse which are associated with its classification into formal types.

=== Scansion ===
Various factors are considered in scanning Classical Chinese verse in order to determine the meter.

==== Meter ====
For the purpose of metrically scanning Classical Chinese verse, the basic unit corresponds to a single character, or what is considered one syllable: an optional consonant or glide (or in some versions of reconstructed Old or Middle Chinese a consonantal cluster), an obligatory vowel or vowel cluster (with or without glides), and an optional final consonant. Thus a seven-character line is identical with a seven-syllable line; and, barring the presence of compound words, which were rare in Classical Chinese compared to Modern Chinese (and even people's names would often be abbreviated to one character), then the line would also be a seven words itself. Classical Chinese tends toward a one-to-one correspondence between word, syllable, and a written character. Counting the number of syllables (which could be read as varying lengths, according to the context), together with the caesuras, or pauses within the line, and a stop, or long pause at the end of the line, generally established the meter. The characters (or syllables) between the caesuras or end stops can be considered to be a metric foot. The caesuras tended to both be fixed depending upon the formal rules for that type of poem and to match the natural rhythm of speech based upon units of meaning spanning the characters.

==== Line length ====
Line length could be fixed or variable, and was based on the number of syllables/characters. In more formal poetry it tended to be fixed, and varied according to specific forms. Lines were generally combined into couplets. Lines tended to be end-stopped; and, line couplets almost always. Line length is the fundamental metrical criterion in classifying Classical Chinese poetry forms. Once the line length is determined, then the most likely division(s) of the line by caesuras is also known, since they are as a rule fixed in certain positions. Thus, specifying the line-length of a Chinese poem is equivalent to specifying both the type of feet and the number of feet per line in poetry using quantitative meter.

===== Fixed line length poems =====
A three-character line is known from the Three Character Classic, a book for children written in three-character eight-line verse in rhymed couplets.

Four-character lines are encountered in the popular form of verse matching, where two verses are matched, often with rhyme, and often traditional four-character idioms (chengyu), frequently drawn from classical poetry. For instance, two four-character lines may be written on matching scrolls, in Chinese calligraphy, and each decoratively hung on either side of a door or entrance way, these are known as Duilian. Some ancient style poetry was also four-line.

Six-character line lengths are relatively rare in fixed-length poems, but are found for example in the work of Wang Jian.

Five, Seven, and eight (or doubled four) character lines are standard for serious, fixed-length poetry.

===== Variable line length poems =====
Some poems have lines of variable lengths within a single poem, either experimentally, as unique specimens, or in certain fixed formats. For example, the poems written according to fixed patterns based, or originally based, upon song lyrics such as the cí form or upon folk ballads such as the yuefu. The "tune", or tonal structure of these poems was also fixed within each specific pattern. This resulted eventually in quite a few fixed-forms with variable line lengths within each piece, with hundreds of named models identified. Often the name of the model used features in the title of the poem.

==== Couplets ====
Most Classical Chinese verse consists of multiple couplets or pairs of lines (simplified Chinese: 对联; traditional Chinese: 對聯; pinyin: duìlián), which are considered to be somehow especially related to each other by such considerations as meaning, tone-structure, or parallelism. A common rhyme scheme is the rhymed couplet, so that generally in rhymed poetry, the even numbered lines rhyme. Sometimes these couplets appear by themselves, for example one-half on each side of a door.

==== Poem length ====
Because of the tendency to write poetry as groups of couplets, most poems had an even number of lines. Generally four lines (two couplets) were considered to be the minimum length for a poem. In the case of curtailed verse (jueju), the poem was limited to this length. Other types of poems were limited to eight lines (four couplets). If the overall length of some form of poetry was not limited, the poems tended to be written using four or eight line stanzas, so the poem lengths would work out to multiples of four or eight. Some poems were quite long. The length of poems based upon specific song and ballad forms depended upon the specific tune or form selected as the model. The fu type of poem, which sometimes even incorporated sections of prose, had few limitations on line length, except that, within a section of verse, the line lengths tended to be of equal length. A specific poem's length for those forms in which this was a restriction, is another basic classifying criterion (as in Seven-character eight-line verse).

==== Old, new, regulated, unregulated ====
Poems of the same length in terms of line-length and poem-length and/or poems within the same general type were often distinguished by using the concepts "new", "old", "regulated", or "unregulated".

===== "Old" versus "new" =====
"Old" and "new" were generally used to denote a basic change of form within a mode or form, like "old" yuefu and "new" yuefu. However, the use of these terms can be confusing, since something called "new" might be centuries old by the present time.

===== "Regulated" versus "unregulated" =====
"Regulated" verse, or new-style shi poetry, has very strict and often complex formal limitations, such as mandatory tonal alterations between adjacent positions within a line, or in regards to the same line-positions between couplets.

==== Tone ====
The existence of tone in Old through early Tang Chinese is debatable. Certainly by the major period of poetic flourishing in Tang, syllable tones were divided into level and not-level. These variations were or became an important aspect of poetry, sometimes in an esoteric way. The presence or absence of formal tonal constraints regarding tone pattern varies according to the poetic form of a specific poem. Sometimes the rules governing the permissible tone patterns for a poem were quite strict, yet still allowed for a certain amount of liberty and variation, as in the case of Regulated verse. In the fixed-tone pattern type of verse the poems were written according to preexisting models known as "tunes". This was the case with the cí and the qu: an individual poem was written so that its tone pattern (and line lengths) were the same as one of the model types, the poetic variation was in the change in the particular wording of the lyrics.

==== Rhythm ====
Rhythm was mostly a matter of tonal variation, line length, caesuras within lines, and end stopping. Variations of rhythm were subtly played off in between the various lines within a poem.

==== Rhyme ====
Rhyme, or rime, was important in some forms of poetry. However, it was often based on a formal and traditional schema, such as is in a Rime table or rime dictionary, and not necessarily upon actual vernacular speech. The Pingshui Yun system was the standard for poetry rhyme from Yuan to Qing dynasty, even though it was very different from actual contemporary pronunciations. Also, generally level tones only rhymed with level tones, and non-level tones with non-level tones. The original rhymes of a poem can be difficult to detect, especially in Modern Chinese, such as Mandarin Chinese and Cantonese pronunciations (including syllable finals and tone) tend to be quite different from in the older, historical types of Chinese language, although perhaps to a lesser extent in Cantonese: either way, Classical Chinese is no longer a spoken language, and pronunciation was subject to major historical variation, as attested through linguistic studies.

=== Vocabulary ===
Certain restrictions or associations of particular words were often typical of certain poetic forms, and for some forms of poetry there were rules restricting or encouraging the repetition of the same word within a poem, a stanza, or a line or couplet. Sometimes a deliberately archaic or traditional poetic vocabulary was used. Often the use of common words such as pronouns and "empty words" like particles and measure words were deprecated. Certain standard vocabulary substitutions were standard where a certain word would not fit into the metrical pattern.

== Formal types ==
Classical Chinese poems are typified by certain formal structures. Some of these can be considered closed collections, such as the groups of poems actually composing the Classic of Poetry (Shijing), the Songs of the South (Chuci), or the Nineteen Poems: These corpora were closed categories, one could not add to these classics, although one might write poems in the similar style, as in Old Style Poetry (Gushi). Further, one might follow the new styles that were introduced over succeeding dynasties, or make up one's own style, which may or may not catch on. In terms of literary form, however, Classical Chinese poetry has the three main formal types: shi, fu, and cí.

=== Shi ===
Shi (poetry)
- Shuowen seal script character for shi ("poetry")
- Traditional Chinese: 詩
- Simplified Chinese: 诗
- Hanyu Pinyin: shī
- Wade–Giles: shih

Although in Chinese the word shi can mean "poetry" more or less generically, in a more technical sense shi refers to a certain more specific tradition within the broader category of poetry, which references the poems collected in the Shijing and further developments along certain lines. There are various types of shi poetry, such as "old style" gushi and "new style" jintishi.

==== Classic of Poetry (Shijing) ====
This is the style of those poems which compose this collection, the Shijing, or Shi Jing, known variously in English such as The Book of Songs, the Classic of Poetry, the "Book of Odes", or just The Odes. Associated with the court of the Zhou dynasty, particularly Western Zhou, the poems of this collection are of uncertain dates. Some of the individual pieces of this material may be quite older than other ones. The Classic of Poetry was edited supposedly by Confucius in the Spring and Autumn period, which correlates with the first half of the Eastern Zhou. Confucius at this time is said to have chosen approximately 300 out of a collection which at that time included about 3,000 individual pieces of verse. Although some of these may have been collected as folk-songs, they show signs of editorial reworking. The original musical scores and choreography meant to be performed together with them have all been lost. In following dynasties, especially with the Han dynasty deification of Confucius and the incorporation of the Classic of Poetry into the mandatory material for testing under the imperial examination system, the poems within it became subject to much artificial and moralistic reinterpretation. Especially the sexual elements came to be officially viewed as parables for love of the Confucian rites and social order, especially the love of the subject for his political lord and master. Although of historical interest and importance, such interpretations are not in line with modern scholarship. All of the Classic of Poetry's poems are anonymous.

The style of the poems represent the first examples of Chinese regular verse; that is verse with fixed-length lines, generally of four characters, with these mostly as syntactic couplets. Its poems also feature a good deal of rhythmic repetition and variation and many of the songs or poems are arranged into stanzas of similar metrical structure. The poems use end rhyme and internal rhyme, occasional parallelism, and a vocabulary of identical and matching words.

=== Verses of Chu (Chuci) ===
Chuci, also known as Songs of the South and as Ch'u Tz'u, refers to the poems and the style of those poems which compose this collection. The name literally refers to the state of Chu, which was to the south of the area from which the poems of the Classic of Poetry were collected, and south of the main area populated by people of Chinese culture in China at the time of its composition and for many centuries afterwards (in fact, until the great population change in the time of the Song dynasty, or, perhaps more accurately, the time of the Tang-Song transition). The collection includes the Li Sao, attributed to Qu Yuan, as well as the Nine Songs.

=== Fu ===
Classical Chinese poetry forms
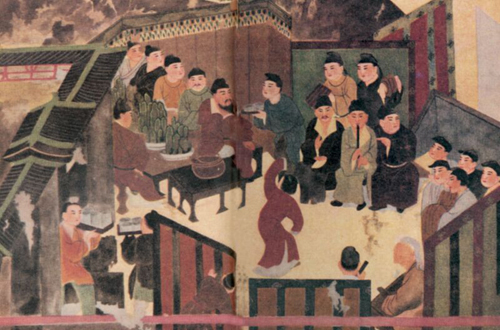
- Han dynasty literary gathering at the court of Liu Wu, King of Liang
- Traditional Chinese: 賦
- Simplified Chinese: 赋
Transcriptions
Standard Mandarin
- Hanyu Pinyin: Fù
- Wade–Giles: Fu
Yue: Cantonese
- Jyutping: Fu^{3}
Southern Min
- Hokkien POJ: Hu
Middle Chinese
- Middle Chinese: Pju^{C}

Fu is one of the traditional main categories of Classical Chinese poetry, or literature; however, it is traditionally not generally considered not to be a pure form of poetry (having been usually classified as wen rather than shi—however, the Chinese terms do not really correspond with the English terms "literature" and "poetry"). The main characteristics of the fu form are that each individual piece be multisectional, that the sectional divisions are marked in one or more of 3 ways, that the whole piece be monothematic (devoted to one explicit topic), and that the description of this topic be exhaustive, both in detail and vocabulary. Other, less apparent features are also typically present, which can be summarized as being part of a process of poetic indirection. Even though subject to extreme minimalism the indirect commentary forms the true crux of this art form.

==== Formal elements ====
===== Definition =====
Certain elements of a fu are definitional, or obligatory. In order for a piece of literature to be considered to be a fu certain, basic criteria must be met.

Multisectionality for fu is obligatory. The sections may be differentially marked in three various ways: change in meter, change in rhyme, and change in supernumerary phrase usage. Sometimes the formal sectional divisions are marked by change between prose and poetry. In printed versions, typographic spacing is also used.

Conventions of the fu include that each particular fu focus on one particular theme or subject. And, that this theme or subject be treated in exhaustive detail. This tends to lead to an art form characterized by hyperbole and the artistic use of explicit exclusion.

===== Vocabulary =====
A typical feature of the fu form is the repetitive use of certain nonce syllables or "empty words" in fixed positions within the lines. For example, the fu form often but not necessarily includes the use of the exclamatory particle 兮 (pinyin: xī; Wade–Giles: hsi, Middle Chinese (Tang) hei, Old Chinese: *gˤe). The character 兮 is an interjection generally used at the end of a line within a couplet, or as a mid-line break within one line. Similarly characteristic of the fu is the use of certain other particular fixed position particles (function, or "empty" words), often at or near the center of a line, and probably with an unstressed pronunciation. Another characteristic of the fu form is the use of supernumerary initial words or phrases, and or the use paired particles. The use of these words or phrases are typically used repetitively in parallel constructions. As for the rest of the words, the author strives for a rich, varied vocabulary, designed to impress the reader by an exhaustive display of synonyms including the rare, the obscure, and the exotic.

===== Rhyme, meter, and stanzaic divisions =====
Generally, every other line in a particular fu rhyme; that is, fu tend to use rhymed couplets. The complex metering is determined by line-length, caesura, and the use of certain specific particles, in fixed positions. The line-lengths within a particular fu tend to vary, yet remain consistent within each discrete section, so that the lines within each section usually are of equal length to each other. The use of a luan in the form of an appended lyrical coda, is "not uncommon". Thus, the end of a fu often consists of a final stanza or section which poetically sums up the piece in a brief reprise.

==== Generic features ====
As a genre, fu tend to express certain themes or topics.

===== Topics and themes =====
Fu can be on various topics and themes, although each individual piece is strictly limited in its explicit focus. Typical subjects of fu tend to be an exotic object or creature (such as a parrot), a well-known object or creature but which is shown in a new and boldly impressive way to the reader (such as an owl), the majesty and luxury of noble rulers (such as the royal hunt), and the "fu of discontent", that is, the frustrations experienced by a scholar (such as not being properly rewarded and appreciated by royal patronage despite great talent and true loyalty).

===== Poetic indirection =====
The use of poetic indirection is a key feature of fu. That is the poet may hint at a certain point by subtly and discretely including a comment hinting towards something or by deliberately avoiding saying what the reader would otherwise expect to appear within the highly structured context of the piece. So, on the one hand, the fu style is a lavish and florid rhapsody of almost unrestrained gushing forth upon an explicit topic; but, typically, on the other hand, the authors use the greatest restraint and circumspection to impart a subtle discourse for the discerning and critical reader.

===== Protest =====
Despite the surface appearance of fu as unrestrained enthusiasm for some particular object or event upon which the author gets carried away in a rhapsody of words, in actuality the fu genre traditionally dealt with sociopolitical protest, such as the theme of the loyal scholar-official who has been overlooked for promotion or even been unjustly exiled by the ruler or by a disloyal faction in power at the court, rather than receiving the promotion and respect which he truly deserves. This may be expressed allegorically through the use of the persona of a friend or historical figure (a safer course in the case of a poet-official who might be punished for any too blatant criticism of the current emperor). In a fu elaborately describing the exotic luxuries possessed by the nobility at the royal courts described so lavishly there is an implied contrast with the life of suffering and deprivation experienced by the common folk, implicit to the reader, but not directly stated. A rhapsody on the royal hunt, and the vast slaughter of creatures powerless to save themselves from the majestic power of the royal hunt for the enjoyment of the ruler also invites the reader to make a comparison with the nature of imperial political power in human society. Criticism in fu of the current social or political situation was traditionally done in the most restrained and indirect way possible: explicit social or political commentary was not acceptable, unless it was masked by setting it in the confines of a former era and avoiding mention of any similarity with the current dynastic power, which, if mentioned could only be lavishly praised. For example, a traditional fu theme during the Han dynasty was the unfair treatment of scholar-official Qu Yuan, at the hands of high-ranking officials in the former Kingdom of Chu: this allows for the reader to compare the situation of the author versus the current officialdom, but does not compel such an interpretation, allowing for what might be called "deniable plausibility", and a defense against a charge of lèse-majesté. Part of the poetic tradition was to actively engage the reader as a participant in the process of a poetic experience; and, although not a purely poetic form, the fu shares this feature of providing a space where the reader and the author can meet half way, and in the case of the fu this tends to be an engagement with social or political criticism. As Hellmut Wilhelm puts it: "...the Han fu can easily be classified into a limited number of types. All types have one feature in common: almost without exception they can be and have been interpreted as voicing criticism—either of the ruler, the ruler's behavior, or certain political acts or plans of the ruler; or of the court officials or the ruler's favorites; or, generally, of the lack of discrimination in the employment of officials. The few examples that are positive in tone recommend the authors or their peers for employment, or even contain specific political suggestions. In short, almost all fu have a political purport, and, in addition, almost all of them deal with the relationship between the ruler and his officials." Seen in context, Ban Gu's discussion of Qu Yuan and the Chu sao style is less to the point of the actual evolutionary path of the fu and more to the point that the main purpose of the fu is political and social criticism through poetic indirection: thus, in fu, paradoxically, the "fantastic descriptions and an overflowing rhetoric...can be reduced to...restraint", as the sociopolitical criticism which was key to the fu was constrained within a very subtle, elaborately indirect, occasional, and allusive mode.

==== History ====
The fu form is associated with the influence of Chu literature, as anthologized in the Chuci and it had a great flourishing during the beginning of the Han dynasty (founded 206 BCE). The Book of Han explicitly references the Xunzi fu, from the Warring States era from which the Han dynasty emerged.

==== Examples ====
Many examples of fu exist, some number of which have been translated into French, English, and other languages. For example, "Return to the Field", by Zhang Heng (78–139).

==== Fu authors ====
Various persons are prominent in the area of fu literature, including original authors, anthologists, critics, and translators.

Han dynasty authors of fu include Jia Yi, Zhang Heng, Ban Gu, Yang Xiong, Wang Can (177–217), and Sima Xiangru. Consort Ban is also credited with authoring several Han fu. Also: Mi Heng (173–198). Wang Can (177–217) was a late-Han/early Jian'an fu author.

During the Six dynasties era, Guo Pu wrote fu during the Eastern Jin dynasty. In the field of criticism and fu authorship, Lu Ji's's Wen fu is an important work, which was later rendered into English by Achilles Fang. The Wen Xuan anthologized by Xiao Tong (501–531) is an important source work for surviving fu, including fu which he attributes to Song Yu.

During the Tang dynasty fu revival, the fu form was used by Li Bai, among others.

=== Old Style Poetry (Gushi) ===
Gushi is the style based upon older forms of shi, but allowing new additions to the corpus (unlike the fixed corpus of the "classic shi" of the Shijing).

One type of poetry imitative of "old" poetic forms is the Literary Yuefu. The literary yuefu include imitations in the style of original Han dynasty ballad lyrics or imitations of the original "Southern-style" ballad lyrics from the Six Dynasties.

The gushi form begins with the Nineteen Old Poems.

==== Nineteen Poems ====
The Nineteen Old Poems, sometimes shortened to Nineteen Poems, and also known in English transliteration as Ku-shih shih-chiu shih, refers both to a specific collection of poems as well as to the style in which those poems were composed. The original nineteen poems, in the ballad or old yuefu style, were collected during the Han dynasty.

=== Yuefu ===
Yuefu were a development of the forms of poetic literature collected by or edited by the Han dynasty Music Bureau. In later dynasties the term yuefu ("Music Bureau") was used to identify these officially propagated ballad-style poems, as well as being used as a descriptor for poems in the yuefu style, as it came to be elaborated by following poets. These later yuefu were sometimes distinguished from the classic anthology pieces by qualifying these yuefu as "new" or "literary" "yuefu".

==== Old Music Bureau Lyrics (old yuefu) ====
This is the style of the official Han dynasty Music Bureau, which once existed.

==== New yuefu ====
This is the style, consisting of several subdivisions, of those poems based upon the poems and the style of the poems of the former Han dynasty Music Bureau, after it had ceased to exist.

=== New pattern poems (jintishi) ===
Regulated verse, or jintishi includes three subforms. Although, to a quick glance not necessarily all that different from regular line length yuefu in terms of line length in characters per line, or numbers of lines, there are internally a whole "new" (at the time of their introduction, in the Tang dynasty) set of rules or regulations, for example regarding tonal patterns, parallelism, repetition of characters.

==== Eight-line Regulated Verse (lushi) ====
Lushi refers to the regulated, or strict formal rules, of this poetry form. It is most associated with the eight-line style, although the same rules basically apply to the curtailed form (jueju) and the expanded form (pailu).

- Five-character eight-line regulated verse (wulu)

A form of regulated verse with eight lines of five characters each.

- Six-character eight-line regulated verse is relatively rare.
- Seven-character eight-line regulated verse (qilu)

A form of regulated verse with eight lines of seven characters each.

==== Curtailed form (jueju) ====
The curtailed form is sometimes referred to as a quatrain due to its requirement to consist of four lines. Basically, the jueju is a shortened version of the eight-line version, resulting in a verse form which can more challenging in terms of conveying a complete poem or developing a complete poetic concept; this is, indeed, especially the case with the five-character line version.

- Five-character four-line curtailed verse (wujue)

Also known as the Five-character-quatrain, this form of regulated verse is characterized by four lines of five characters each.

- Seven-character four-line curtailed verse (qijue)

Also known as the Seven-character-quatrain, this is a form of regulated verse with four lines of seven characters each.

==== Expanded form (pailu) ====
While embracing all, or most of, the lushi rules and regulations the pailu allows for a number of linked couplets with no maximum upward limit. A strict emphasis on formal parallelism is typical of the pailu form.

=== Fixed tone-pattern poetry ===
Poems based on traditional structures, originally meant as lyrics to go along with particular musical tunes or scoring, included in the fixed tone-pattern forms are the cí, qu, and yuanqu.

==== Cí ====
Poems based on traditional structures, originally meant as lyrics to go along with music.

==== Qu and Yuanqu ====
Qu, similarly to Cí, refers to a fixed tone-pattern form of poetry; however, the tunes to which the qu are based are different from the cí poems, and also there are some accompanying stylistic differences. Yuanqu are fixed tone-pattern poems derived from Yuan dramas, or matching the arias of those operas. The "Yuan" part of the name is merely a reference to the dynastic era involved, namely the Yuan dynasty.

== See also ==
- Chinese art
- Chinese literary works (Category)
- Chinese literature, Classical poetry section
- Chinese Sanqu poetry
- Classical Chinese poetry
- Classical Chinese poetry genres
- Chinese poetry
- Shi (poetry)
- Cí (poetry)
- Classic of Poetry
- Five Classics
- Fu (poetry)
- Jueju
- List of Chinese language poets
- Music Bureau
- Pailu
- Pingshui Yun
- Qu (poetry)
- Qijue
- Regulated verse
- Sanqu
- Rime dictionary
- Rime table
- Shigin
- Six dynasties poetry
- Song poetry
- Tang poetry
- Tone pattern
- Yuefu
