= Nineteen Old Poems =

Collection of Han dynasty folk-song style Chinese poems

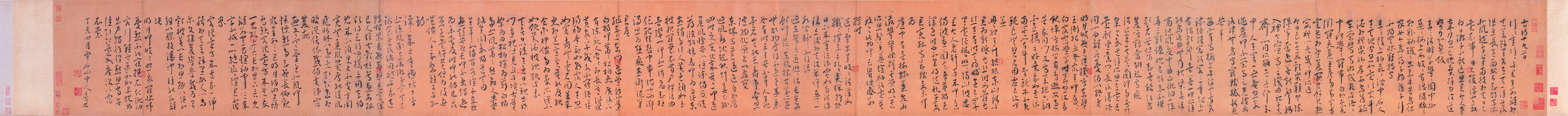

Nineteen Old Poems (traditional Chinese: 古詩十九首; simplified Chinese: 古诗十九首; pinyin: Gǔshī Shíjiǔ Shǒu; Wade–Giles: Ku-shih shih-chiu shou) is a collection of nineteen ancient Chinese poems which were likely composed during the Han dynasty by poet-musicians inspired by the artistry of folk song Yuefu. They first appeared in the early Chinese literary anthology Wen Xuan, a compilation of poetry and literature by Liang Crown Prince Xiao Tong. Modern scholarship pinpointed the time of composition to be between 140 and 190 CE during the Eastern Han dynasty, based on their narrative content, emotional expression, and mature literary techniques. The authorship of the "Nineteen Old Poems" is anonymous. However, indicators such as references to carriages, fine clothing, mansions, and upper-class entertainments—as well as allusions to the Shijing— suggest that the authors were members of the educated elite.

One of the tendencies of these poems is towards a "tone of brooding melancholy." As Watson put it, the poems are "anonymous voices speaking to us from a shadowy past, they sound a note of sadness that is to dominate the poetry of the centuries that follow." Recurring themes in these poems include the sorrows and frustrations of a travelling man or a longing wife, a timeless lament for life's transience and the unpredictability of fate. These emotions were born out of its time, yet they are universal and have resonated with readers across different backgrounds and eras.

The Nineteen Poems represented the peak of five-syllable verses by the Han literati. Inspired by the folk song style, these poems feature plain language, natural flow, but on the other hands, are highly refined and expressive. These nineteen poems were very influential on later poetry, in part because of their use of the five-character line (五言詩; 五言诗; wǔ yán shī). The formats, techniques, and thematic choices of these ancient poems have a lasting impact on later generation poets, including Cao Pi and Cao Zhi.

== See also ==
- Classical Chinese poetry
- Gushi (poetry)
- Han poetry
- Wen Xuan

== Bibliography ==
- Watson, Burton, ed. (1971). Chinese lyricism: Shih poetry from the second to the twelfth century, with translations. Companions to Asian studies. New York: Columbia Univ. Pr. ISBN 978-0-231-03465-4.
- Yip, Wai-lim, ed. (1997). Chinese poetry: an anthology of major modes and genres (in English and Chinese). Durham: Duke University Press. ISBN 978-0-8223-1951-1.
- Shao, Yiping (1996). Zhang, Peiheng; Luo, Yuming (eds.). Zhongguo wen xue shi 中国文学史-上 [History of Chinese Literature - Volume 1] (in Chinese). Shanghai: Fu dan da xue chubanshe. ISBN 978-7-309-01489-1.
- Zhang, Fengyi; Zhao, Ji (2003). Luo, Zongqiang; Chen, Hong (eds.). Zhongguo gu dai wen xue fa zhan shi 中国古代文学发展史-上. Vol. 1 (Di 1 ban ed.). Tianjin: Nan kai da xue chubanshe. ISBN 7-310-01915-6.
