= Tone pattern =

Constraints in Classical Chinese poetry

Chinese name
- Chinese: 平仄
Transcriptions
Standard Mandarin
- Hanyu Pinyin: píngzè
Yue: Cantonese
- Jyutping: ping4 zak1
Southern Min
- Hokkien POJ: piâⁿ-cheh

Vietnamese name
- Vietnamese alphabet: bằng trắc
- Chữ Hán: 平仄

Korean name
- Hangul: 평측
- Hanja: 平仄
Transcriptions
- Revised Romanization: pyeongcheuk

Japanese name
- Kanji: 平仄
- Kana: ひょうそく
Transcriptions
- Romanization: hyōsoku

Tone patterns (Chinese: 平仄; pinyin: píngzè; Jyutping: ping4 zak1; Tâi-lô: piânn-ceh) are common constraints in classical Chinese poetry.

The four tones of Middle Chinese—level (平), rising (上), departing (去), and entering (入) tones—are categorized into level (平) tones and oblique (仄) tones. Tones that are not level are oblique. When tone patterns are used in poetry, the pattern in which level and oblique tones occur in one line is often the inverse of that of the line next to it. For example, in the poem 春望 (pinyin: chūn wàng, Spring View) by Du Fu, the tone pattern of the first line is 仄仄平平仄, while that of the second line is 平平仄仄平:

國(仄) 破(仄) 山(平) 河(平) 在(仄)
城(平) 春(平) 草(仄) 木(仄) 深(平)

== In poetry ==
In Classical Chinese poetry, the presence or absence of formal tonal constraints regarding tone pattern varies according to the poetic form of a specific poem. Sometimes the rules governing the permissible tone patterns for a poem were quite strict, yet still allowed for a certain amount of liberty and variation, as in the case of regulated verse. In the fixed-tone pattern type of verse, poems were written according to preexisting models known as "tunes". This was the case with the ci and the qu: an individual poem was written so that its tone pattern (and line lengths) were the same as one of the model types, the poetic variation was in the change in the particular wording of the lyrics.

== See also ==
=== General ===
- Tone (linguistics)
- Four tones of Middle Chinese

=== Tone pattern in poetry ===
- Chinese Sanqu poetry
- Ci (poetry)
- Qu (poetry)
- Regulated verse
