= Lüshi (poetry) =

Classical Chinese poetry form

Lüshi (traditional Chinese: 律詩; simplified Chinese: 律诗; pinyin: lǜshī; Wade–Giles: lü-shih) refers to a specific form of Classical Chinese poetry verse form. One of the most important poetry forms of classical Chinese poetry, the lüshi refers to an eight-line regulated verse form with lines made up of five, six, or seven characters; thus:

- Five-character eight-line regulated verse (wulü): a form of regulated verse with eight lines of five characters each.
- Six-character eight-line regulated verse is relatively rare.
- Seven-character eight-line regulated verse (qilü): a form of regulated verse with eight lines of seven characters each.
- Extended forms (pailü): expansion of the forms listed above with more than eight lines.

All lüshi forms are rhymed on the even lines, with one rhyme being used throughout the poem. Also, and definitionally, the tonal profile of the poem is controlled (that is, "regulated").

== Historical development ==
Although the idea of regulating the tonal pattern of poetry can be traced back to Shen Yue, the lüshi form did not reach its final codification until the seventh century.

== Well-known examples ==
Well-known examples of the form include the Tang poet Li Bai's "Seeing Off a Friend" (送友人) and "On Climbing in Nanjing to the Terrace of Phoenixes" (登金陵鳳凰臺).

== See also ==
- Classical Chinese poetry forms
- Jueju
- Regulated verse
