= Classical Chinese poetry =

The character that more-or-less means "poetry", in the ancient Chinese Great Seal script style. The modern character is shī (詩/诗).

Classical Chinese poetry is traditional Chinese poetry written in Classical Chinese and typified by certain traditional forms, or modes; traditional genres; and connections with particular historical periods, such as the poetry of the Tang dynasty. The existence of classical Chinese poetry is documented at least as early as the publication of the Classic of Poetry (Shijing). Various combinations of forms and genres have developed over the ages. Many or most of these poetic forms were developed by the end of the Tang dynasty, in 907 CE.

The use and development of Classical Chinese poetry actively continued up until the May Fourth Movement, in 1919, and is still developed even today. Poetry created during this period of more-or-less continuous development displays a great deal of diversity – categorized by both major historical periods and by dynastic periods (the traditional Chinese historical method).

Another key aspect of Classical Chinese poetry is its intense inter-relationship with other forms of Chinese art, such as Chinese painting and Chinese calligraphy. Classical Chinese poetry has proven to be of immense influence upon poetry worldwide.

== History and development ==
The stylistic development of Classical Chinese poetry consists of both literary and oral cultural processes. These are usually divided into certain standard periods or eras, in terms both of specific poems as well as characteristic styles; these generally correspond to Chinese dynastic eras, per the traditional Chinese method of chronicling history. The poems preserved in writing form the poetic literature. Parallel traditions of oral and traditional poetry known as popular or folk poems or ballads also exist. Some of these poems have been preserved in written form. Generally, folk-type poems are anonymous, and many show signs of having been edited or polished in the process of recording them in written characters. The main sources for the earliest preserved poems are the Classic of Poetry (Shijing) and the Songs of the South (Chuci). Some individual pieces or fragments survive in other forms – embedded, for example, in classical histories or other literature. During the Tang dynasty poetry was very important

=== Classic of Poetry (Shijing) ===
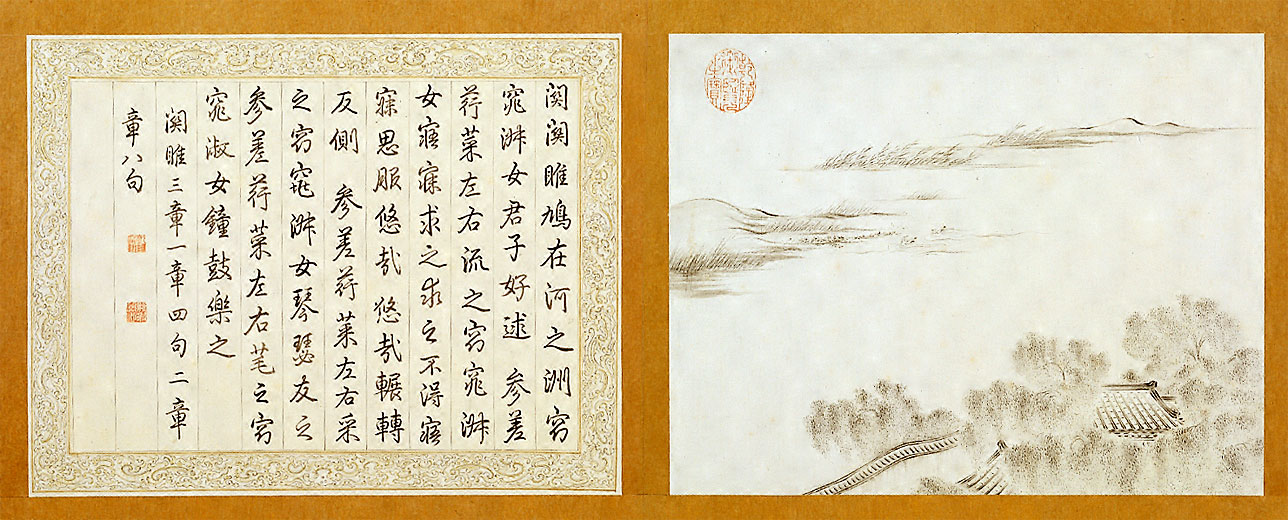
Shijing first verse by Qing Qianlong Emperor. Qing dynasty.

The literary tradition of Classical Chinese poetry begins with the Classic of Poetry, or Shijing, dated to early 1st millennium BC. According to tradition, Confucius (551 BCE – 479 BCE) was the final editor of the collection in its present form, although the individual poems were mostly older than this. Burton Watson dates the anthology's main compilation date to about the 7th century BCE, with the poems having been collected over the previous four to five centuries before. This, among other factors, indicates a sustained cross-class popularity for this type of poetry, including their characteristic four-character per line meter. The Shijing tends to be associated with northern Chinese vocabulary and culture, and in particular with the great sage and philosopher Confucius: this helped encourage the development of this type of poetry into the classic shi style, the literal meaning of Shijing. Despite their commendation by Confucius, there are no extant samples of any poetry of this style made within the next three hundred years. (Note: One possible exception is Cao Cao, who wrote successful poems in the four-character line mode, although these were isolated from the mainstream of Chinese poetry.)

=== Songs of the South (Chu Ci) ===
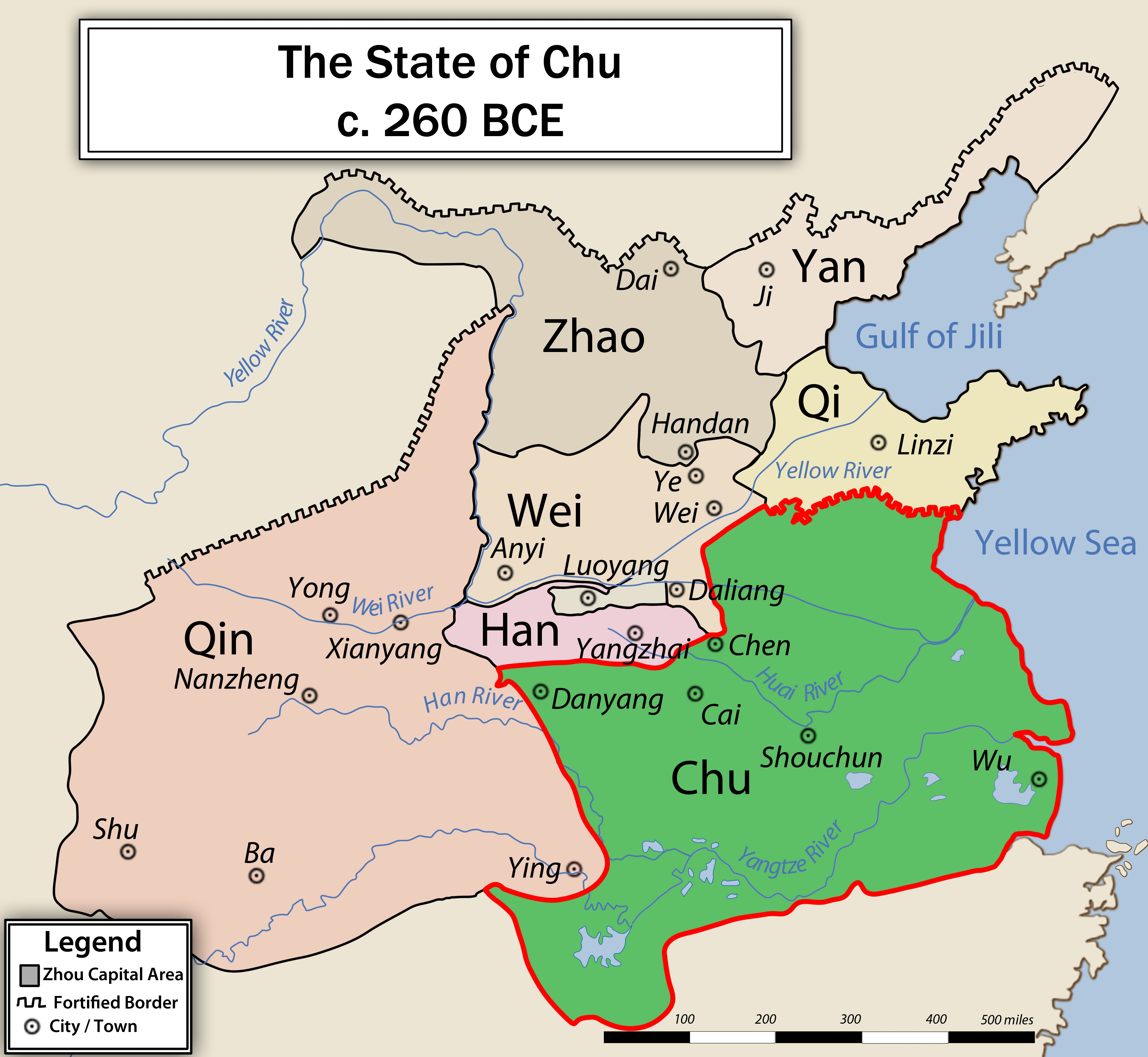
Map of the Chu area, in one of its reconstructed historical configurations

Another early poetry collection/genre is the Chu Ci (dated to the Warring States period about 475–221 BCE), which is typified by various line lengths and the imagery and influence of the vernacular associated with the state of Chu, in southern China. One important part of this is the Li Sao, attributed to Qu Yuan. These poems from the State of Chu are among the most important of all Classical Chinese poetry; however, these poems and their style seem to have had less influence on Classical Chinese poetry, at least at first, than did the Shijing collection and style.

=== Han dynasty ===
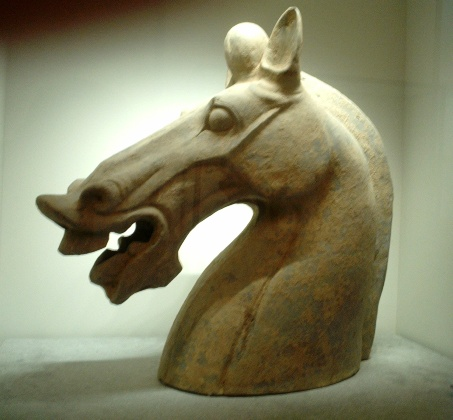
A Han dynasty terracotta horse head (1st–2nd century CE)

The classic shi poetry, with its four-character lines, was revived by Han and Three Kingdoms poets, to some extent. Among other poetic developments during the Han epoch was the development of a new form of shi poetry, dating from about the 1st century BCE, which initially consisted of five- and later seven-character lines. The development of this form of shi poetry occurred in conjunction with various other phenomena related to Han poetry. The new form of shi developed during the Han and the Jian'an period would become known as "gushi", or "ancient style poetry".

==== Music Bureau and folk ballads ====
The Han dynasty witnessed major developments in Classical Chinese poetry, including both the active role of the imperial government in encouraging poetry through the Music Bureau and through its collection of Han dynasty folk ballads (although some of these seem to have been subject to at least some post-folk literary polishing, as in the case of the Shijing). In Chinese, Yuefu, "Music Bureau", is synonymous with yuefu the poetry style, thus the term Yuefu (traditional Chinese: 樂府; simplified Chinese: 乐府; pinyin: yuèfǔ) has come to refer both to the Music Bureau's collected lyrics and to the genre of which they are representative and serve as a source of inspiration. Another important Han dynasty poetry collection is the Nineteen Old Poems.

==== Han fu ====
The Han dynasty poetry is particularly associated with the fu, as opposed to the shi style of poetry or literature: note, however, that this fu (traditional Chinese: 賦; simplified Chinese: 赋; pinyin: fù) is a different word than the fu (府) meaning government bureau in the term yuefu (乐府; sometimes spelled Yüeh Fu, or similarly).

The most celebrated exponent of this style was Sima Xiangru. Yang Xiong, Ban Gu and Zhang Heng were also important fu writers.

=== Jian'an poetry ===
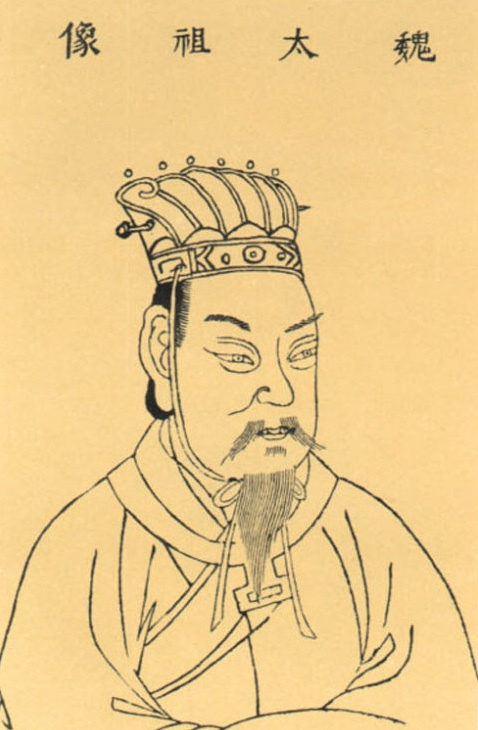
A Ming dynasty portrayal of Cao Cao

Jian'an poetry refers to those poetic movements occurring during the final years of the failing Han dynasty and continuing their development into the beginning of the Six Dynasties period. Jian'an is considered as a separate period because this is one case where the poetic developments fail to correspond with the neat categories aligned to chronology by dynasty. Typical poets of this period are Cao Cao, Cao Pi, Cao Zhi, and Xu Gan. One of the more important poetic developments of this period is toward the odd number, fixed length verse styles also typical of the Tang poetry period. As a result, some of the poetic forms often associated with Tang poetry can be traced back developmentally to some of the forms developed during the Jian'an period.

=== Six Dynasties poetry ===
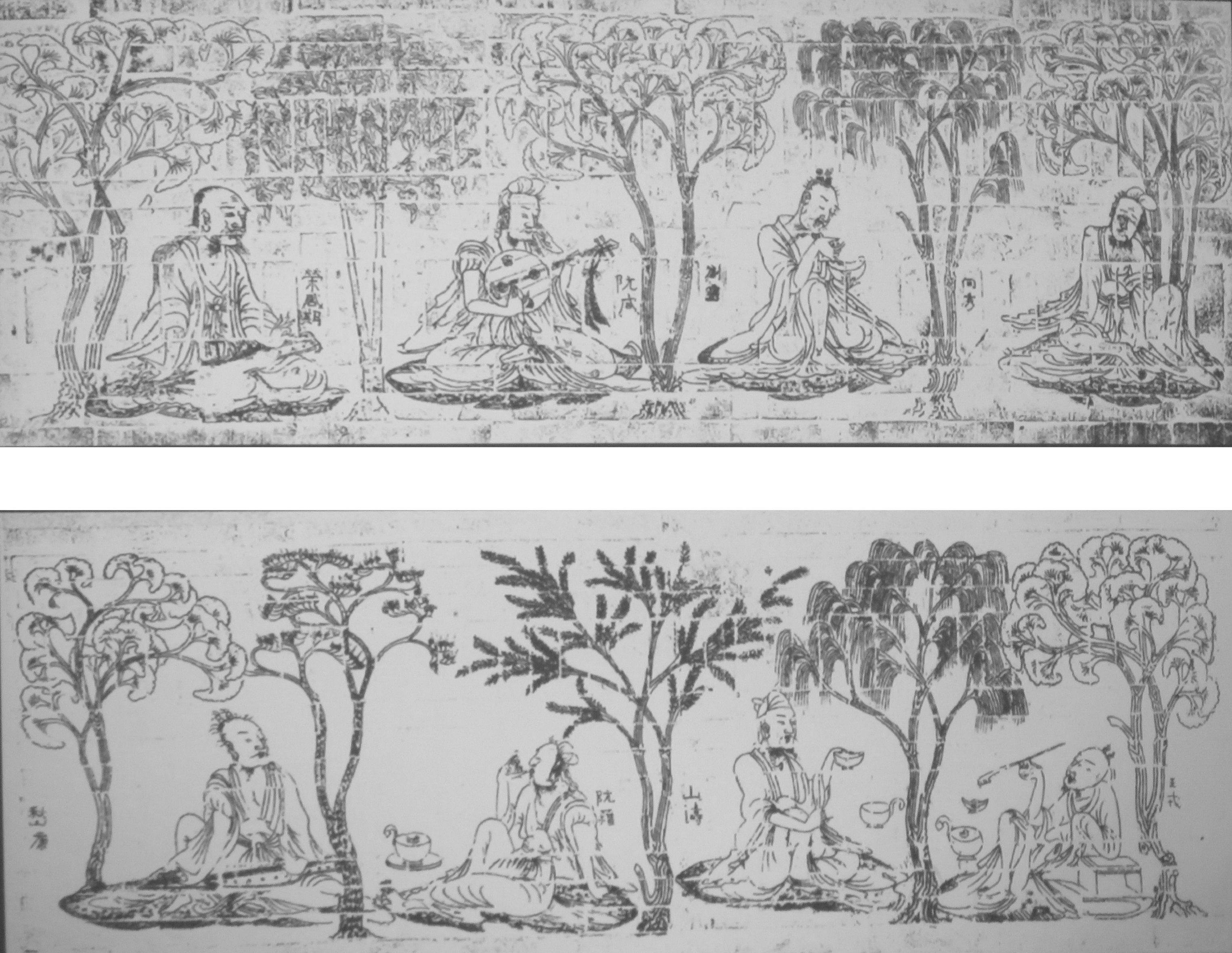
Seven Sages of the Bamboo Grove from a picture from the brick wall of a tomb located near the Eastern Jin capital (modern Nanjing, China)

The Six Dynasties (220–589) also witnessed major developments in Classical Chinese poetry, especially emphasizing romantic love, gender roles, and human relationships, and including the important collection New Songs from the Jade Terrace. The Six Dynasties era covers three main periods: the Three Kingdoms (220–280), Jin dynasty (266–420), and Southern and Northern dynasties (420–589). The Three Kingdoms period was a violent one, a characteristic sometimes reflected in the poetry or highlighted by the poets' seeking refuge from the social and political turmoil by retreating into more natural settings, as in the case of the Seven Sages of the Bamboo Grove. The Jin dynasty era was typified poetically by, for example, the Orchid Pavilion Gathering of 42 literati; the romantic Midnight Songs poetry; and, Tao Yuanming, the great and highly personal poet who was noted for speaking in his own voice rather than a persona. Some of the highlights of the poetry of the Northern and Southern Dynasties include the Yongming poets, the anthology collection New Songs from the Jade Terrace, and Su Hui's Star Gauge.

=== Sui and Tang dynasties poetry ===
==== Sui poetry ====
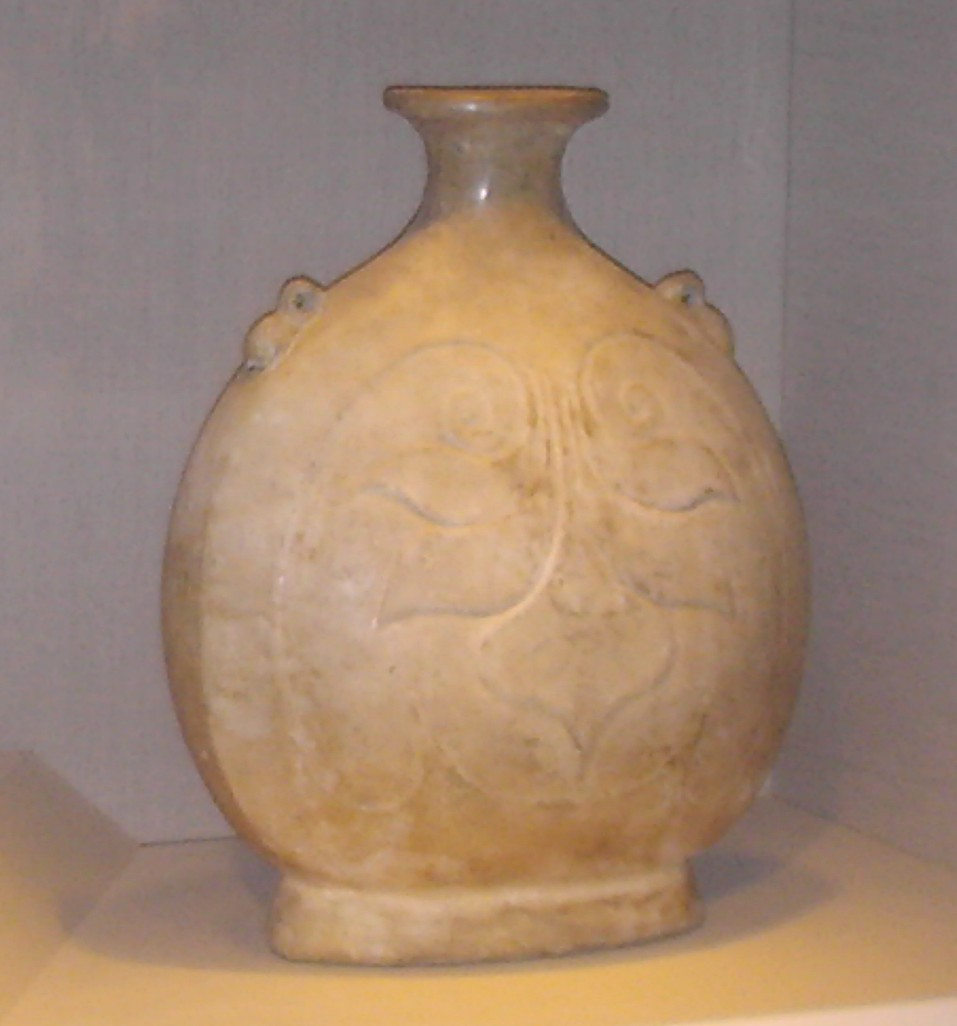
Sui dynasty Pilgrim Flask

Although poetry continued to be written, and certain poets rose in prominence while others disappeared from the landscape, the brief Sui dynasty (581–618 CE) lacks distinction (in terms of the development of Chinese poetry); though it nonetheless represents a continuity between the Six Dynasties and the poetry of Tang. Sui dynasty poets include Yang Guang (580–618), who was the last Sui emperor (and a sort of poetry critic); and also, the Lady Hou, one of his consorts.

==== Tang poetry ====
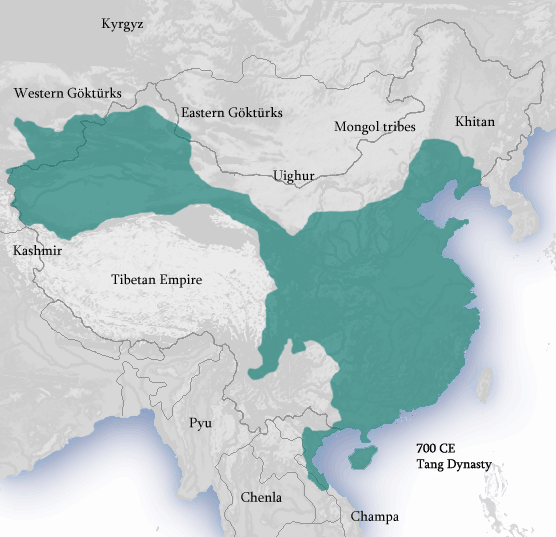
A map showing the approximate extent of the Tang dynasty in the beginning of the 8th century

The Tang dynasty (618–907) was particularly noted for its poetry, especially the shi forms such as jueju and lüshi. This poetry was both a pervasive social phenomenon throughout the Tang literate classes, who developed the ability to compose poems on demand as part of the Imperial examination system, but also a social grace necessary for polite conduct on social occasions, such as part of the interaction at banquets or social gatherings. Some 50,000 poems survive, mostly represented in the Ming dynasty collection the Complete Tang Poems. Their popularity in the historical Chinese cultural area has varied over time, with certain authors coming in and out of favor and others permanently obscure. Some authors, such as Li Bai (also known as Li Po), Du Fu, Wang Wei, Li Shangyin and Bai Juyi (also known as Po Chü-i) managed to maintain consistent popularity.

Tang poetry has developed an ongoing influence on world literature and modern and quasi-modern poetry; for instance, as in the case of Li Bai whose modern influence extends as far as Gustav Mahler's Das Lied von der Erde and Beat poetry. In part because of the prevalence of rhymed and parallel structures within Tang poetry, it also has a role in linguistics studies, such as in the reconstruction of Middle Chinese pronunciation.

=== Song dynasty poetry ===
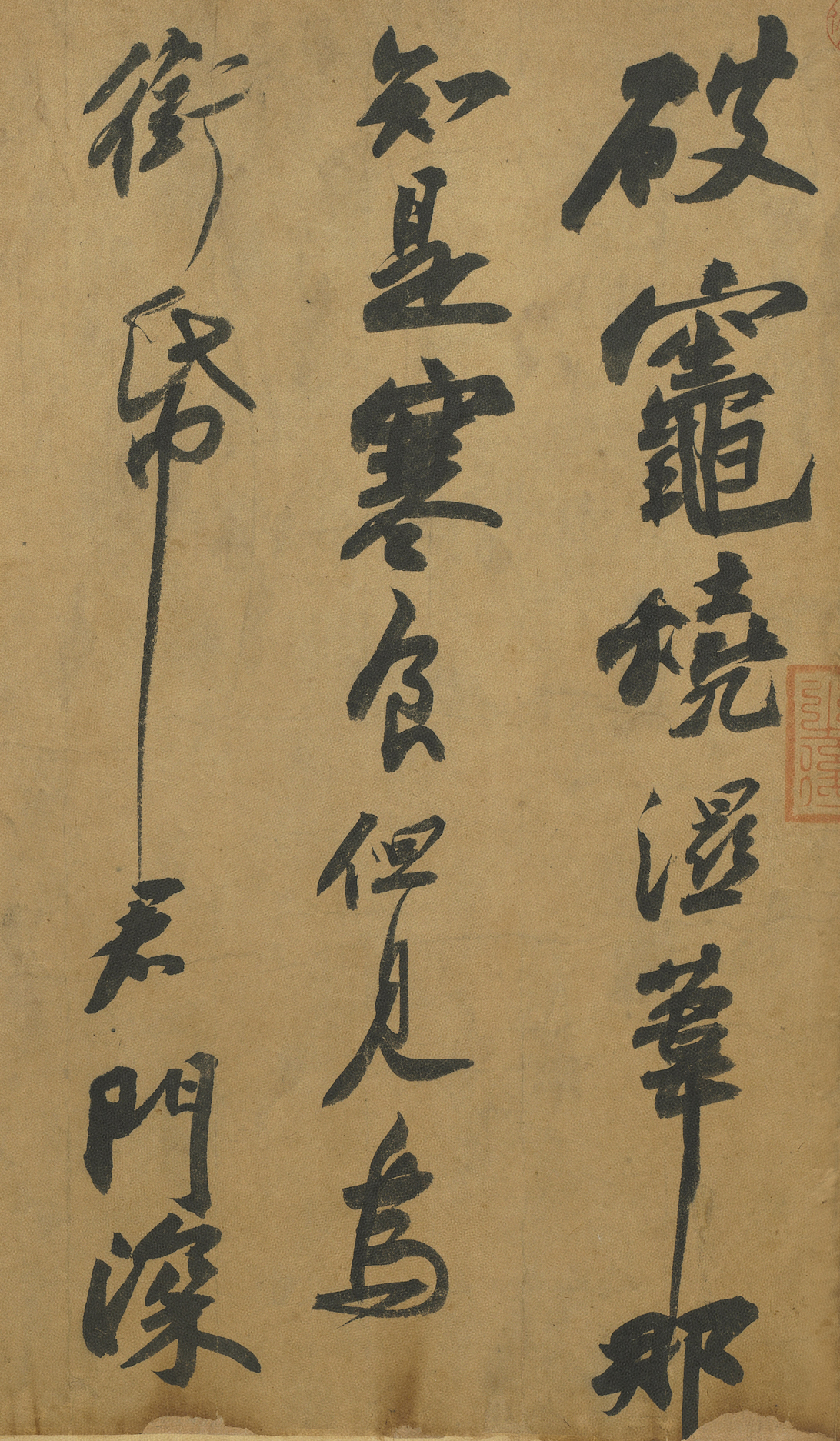
Calligraphy detail of one of Su Shi (Dongpo)'s poems

The Song dynasty (960–1279) was noted for its poetry, perhaps especially the development of the Ci form; indeed, the ci as a poetic form perhaps reached a high point during the Song dynasty. The ci is a kind of lyric poetry using a poetic meter based upon certain patterns of fixed-rhythm formal types, of which there were about 800 of these set patterns, each associated with a particular title. Originally ci were written to be sung to a specific tune of that title, with set rhythm, rhyme, and tempo. However, over time the actual tunes seem to have disappeared (similarly to the case of English ballads). Thus, the title of a certain ci may have nothing to do with its contents, although the poetic meter is the same. It is common for several ci to share the same title. As developed during the Song poetic period, the ci was a versatile verse form. The most prominent ci-poets include Su Shi (Dongpo), Xin Qiji, Li Qingzhao, Liu Yong and Zhou Bangyan.

The shi of the Song dynasty drew on a long tradition of poetry, perhaps especially the "shi" forms which were prevalent in the Tang dynasty. The Song dynasty is known for its achievements in the combination of shi, painting, and calligraphy into a shared art form. Prominent Song shi-poets include Su Shi (Dongpo), Huang Tingjian, Ouyang Xiu, Lu You and Yang Wanli.

The Southern Song dynasty which ruled southern China from 1127 to 1279 was largely co-existent with the Jurchen Jin dynasty (1115–1234), which had established control over northern China and its largely Chinese population. The Chinese poets of the Jin dynasty produced poetry which shared the characteristics of the Song dynasty poetry; and towards the end of the Jin, the poetry begins to similarly show the effects of the Mongol invasions that eventually led to the establishment of the Yuan dynasty with its own characteristic poetry. By far the greatest of Jin dynasty poets was Yuan Haowen. After the fall of the Jin, he lived on for several more decades under the Yuan. According to the Japanese scholar Yoshikawa Kōjirō, Yuan Haowen "may well be the foremost Chinese poet from Du Fu to the present" (John Timothy Wixted's translation).

=== Yuan dynasty poetry ===
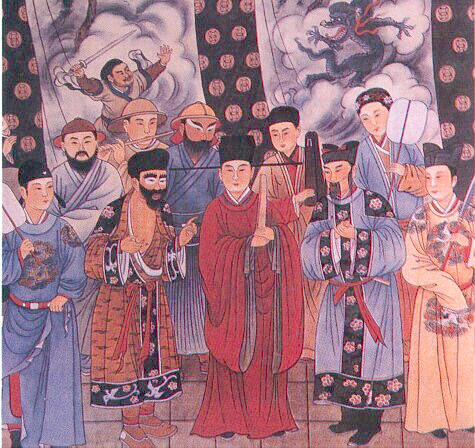
Yuan dynasty theater, a reconstruction based on a contemporary temple mural

Poetry during the Yuan dynasty (1271–1368) continued the Classical Chinese poetry tradition and is especially noted for the burgeoning of Chinese opera verse tradition. Yuan drama's notable qu form was set to music, restricting each individual poem to one of nine modal key selections and one of over two hundred tune patterns. Depending on the pattern, this imposed fixed rhythmic and tonal requirements that remained in place for future poets even if its musical component was later lost. A full drama is called zaju. Besides zaju, some poets wrote qu form of poems independent of a drama. This kind of independent qu is called sanqu. Sanqu is classified into xiaoling, a single song, and taoshu, a song suite formed by combining more than one xiaoling. A lot of writers wrote both full dramas as well as sanqu. Noteworthy Yuan qu-poets include Bai Pu, Guan Hanqing, Ma Zhiyuan, Zheng Guangzu and Qiao Ji.

One exponent of the popular West Lake landscape poetry that flourished at this time was the always skilful and elegant, if sometimes too facile, poet Zhang Kejiu.

Another interesting development during the Yuan dynasty was the incorporation into the Chinese literary canon of a cluster of gifted non-Han poets, such as the Khitan Yelü Chucai, the Muslim Sadula ("perhaps the best poet of the Yuan" according to Stephen H. West), the Ongüt Ma Zuchang and the Karluk Nai Xian.

A painter-poet tradition also thrived during the Yuan period, including masterful calligraphy done by, for example, Ni Zan and Wu Zhen. Another exemplar was Zhao Mengfu (1254–1322), a former official of the Song dynasty who served under the Mongol administration of the Yuan and whose wife Guan Daosheng (1262–1319) was also a painter-poet and calligrapher.

=== Ming dynasty poetry ===
Classical Chinese poetry continued to thrive during the Ming dynasty (1368–1644). Ming prosperity was accompanied by a tremendous increase in population, commerce, and poetry composition. Thanks to educational opportunities made possible by commercial printing and the reinvigorated examination system, a massively larger literate population emerged. This population relied on poetry to express personal emotion and to engage with each other socially. A debate as to whether the Tang or Song poets had achieved the highest heights of excellence solidified a collective opinion that past heights could not be surpassed. With over one million surviving Ming poems, modern critics and researchers have been unable to definitively answer whether that conviction is a prejudice or a fact.

Leading Ming poets include Gao Qi, Li Dongyang, and the publisher-poet Yuan Hongdao. Representatives of the dramatist-poet tradition include Tang Xianzu and Li Yu. Li Yu is also a prime example of the Ming-Qing transition's emotional outpouring when disorder swept away Ming stability as the incoming dynasty's Manchu warriors conquered from North to South. Another example of the poetic focus on emotion during this period is Dong Xiaowan. Ming representatives of the painter-poet tradition include Shen Zhou, Tang Yin, and Wen Zhengming.

=== Qing dynasty poetry ===
Classical Chinese poetry continued to be the major poetic form of the Qing dynasty (1644–1912). This was also a time of related literary developments, such as the collection of Tang poetry under the Kangxi Emperor. The debates, trends, and widespread literacy of the Ming period began to flourish once again after the Qing dynasty had established its dominance. The fresh poetic voice of Yuan Mei has won wide appeal, as have the long narrative poems by Wu Jiaji. Kunqu opera matured and led toward the later Chinese opera tradition of combined drama, poetry, and music. The painter-poet tradition thrived with exemplars such as Yun Shouping.

The challenge for modern researchers grew as even more people became poets and even more poems were preserved, including (with Yuan Mei's encouragement) more poetry by women. In 1980 fine shi poems by the famed Qing novelist Liu E were published for the first time, illustrating the potential to continue finding sunken treasure in the vast body of surviving Qing poetry.

=== Post-Qing Classical Chinese poetry ===
Although Qing is the last Chinese dynasty, this did not mean that Classical Chinese poetry disappeared with the end of the imperial period; indeed, Mao Zedong of the Chinese Communist Party was a major exponent and practitioner of Classical Chinese poetry well into the 20th century. However, the development and great expansion of modern Chinese poetry is generally thought to start at this point in history, or shortly afterwards.

== Oral versus written ==
=== Oral nature of poetry ===
One important aspect of Classical Chinese poetry is that it was generally designed to be chanted or sung, with or without musical accompaniment. In fact, folk poetry, almost by definition, was orally composed and orally transmitted. This is because the "folk" were for the most part illiterate, as opposed to the generally literate scholarly classes; however, even the poems of the scholarly classes were intended to be sung or chanted.

=== Characteristics of written poetry ===
The particular characteristics of the Chinese writing system played an important role in Chinese poetry. In fact, a continuous poetic tradition in China was enabled in part by the fact that Chinese words can be represented by their corresponding Chinese characters semi-independently of their pronunciation (which extends to their use in classical versions of Japanese, Korean, and Vietnamese). The pronunciations of spoken Chinese changed quite a bit over the course of time from the oldest surviving written Chinese poetry (in Old Chinese), through the Middle Chinese period (which included the Tang dynasty), and up into the Modern Chinese period. During this course of development, Classical Chinese evolved as a distinct literary language, distinct from the spoken vernacular. The tension between a spoken vernacular and a literary form of the language worked both ways, the poetry of literature can be seen to have "various degrees of vernacular overlay" and also the oral folk poetry sometimes were "filled with literary phrases and constructions", perhaps due to the prestigious nature of the written language.

=== Influence of Chinese writing system ===
A depiction of the evolution of writing shān, meaning "mountain"

Evolution of the character corresponding to rì, meaning "sun"

Scholars have also asked to what degree the pictorial element latent in Chinese characters informed Classical Chinese poetry. The etymology of Chinese characters is related but distinct from the evolution of the language itself. As is the case with many ancient writing systems, such as the Phoenician alphabet, many of the earliest characters likely began as pictograms, with a given word corresponding to a picture representing that idea.

By the time of Classical Chinese poetry, a complex system of writing had evolved with many characters being composed of combinations of other characters, chosen for similarities of meaning and/or sound. The resulting strong graphical aspect, versus a weaker phonetic element (in comparison to other languages, such as English) is very important. However, different translators of Classical Chinese poetry have emphasized these elements in differing degrees. Sinologist and translator A. C. Graham cautions against overemphasizing this visual effect, which he says can "...act on the imagination like blobs in the Rorschach test. It is rather difficult to estimate this effect since a habitual reader of Chinese is hardly conscious of it without deliberately analysing his reactions....Certainly one can give too much weight to the visual aspect of Chinese writing. Poems in China, as elsewhere, are firstly patterns of sound...." However, Graham is in no way suggesting that the Chinese poet is unaware of the background considerations stemming from character construction.

== Forms ==
There are various typical forms in which Classical Chinese poetry was written. These include the shi, the ci, and qu. The fu literary is also often considered to be within the category of poetry.

== Genres ==
Various genres of Classical Chinese poems have been discerned, either by the composing poet or literary critics. The most widely accepted genres of Classical Chinese poetry include the landscape style poetry genres of Shanshui poetry, and Fields and Gardens poetry, which are associated with poets such as Tao Qian and Wang Wei.

== Features ==
Besides various formal modes and genres, Classical Chinese poetry has several other typical features.

=== Persona ===
The use of a poetic persona is often encountered in Classical Chinese poetry, in which the author writes a poem from the viewpoint of some other person (or type of person). Often these persona types were quite conventional, such as the lonely wife left behind at home, the junior concubine ignored and sequestered in the imperial harem, or the soldier sent off to fight and die beyond the remote frontier.

=== Sociopolitical criticism ===
Many Classical Chinese poems can be read as a commentary upon current events and society. Sometimes this commentary is disguised through the use of symbolic imagery. One popular author who made commentary in this regard was Tang poet Bai Juyi.

=== Imagery and symbolism ===
Certain images and symbolism became quite conventional, and are key to understanding many of the Classical Chinese poems. For example, the falling autumn leaf can refer to personal or dynastic decline.

=== Exile ===
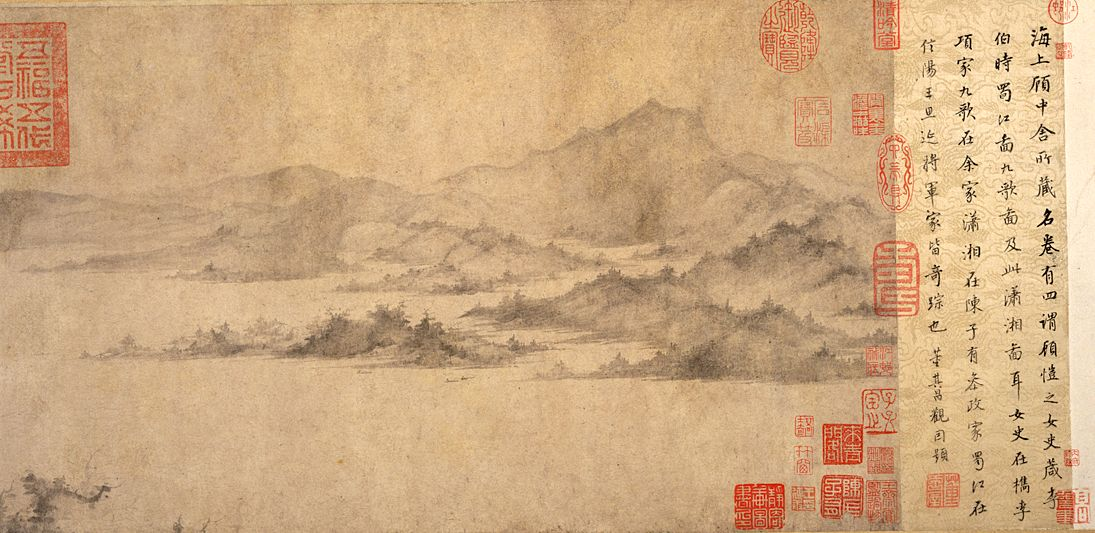
Imaginary tour through Xiao-xiang

Many Classical Chinese poems were written as more-or-less subtle or implied complaints for the treatment of the author by the government. This is in part due to the nature of the imperial examination system as a way of recruiting talented persons into high political office, and the expectations of the talented poet of finding a suitable position within such a society. One example of this is the poetry written to accompany of to follow the eight-fold settings of the Eight Views of Xiaoxiang which were popularized during the Song dynasty; although, the theme can certainly be traced back as far as the Chuci.

=== Allusions ===
Many Classical Chinese poems involve allusions or references to previous literature or well-known folk material.

=== Optional precision ===
In part due to the possibilities inherent in the Classical Chinese language and in part as an esthetic principle, many Classical Chinese poems are imprecise when it comes to gender, number, case, or other logically informative elements of speech which tend to be grammatically obligatory or difficult to avoid in various inflected languages, such as certain Indo-European languages.

=== Reader participation ===
Many Classical Chinese poems appear simple on the surface, but contain deeper, more profound ideas. In order to realize what these are, the reader is expected to meet the poet halfway — not just to be told something, but to actively think and feel in sympathy with the poet or the poet's persona.

=== Parallelism and antithesis ===
==== Parallelism ====
The arrangement of poems into couplets encouraged the use of parallelism: where for two lines of a poem it would be expected that the reader would compare and contrast the meaning of two lines, which would be specifically marked by the poet by using the same parts of speech in each position, or in certain key positions in each line, or else within one line.

==== Antithesis ====
Antithesis refers to the often latent contradiction between two statements which when sufficiently considered can lead to the understanding of a third, unstated opinion. It often plays a part in relationship to parallelism: the reader has to consider whether what seem to be parallel constructions and ideas really are so.

==== Autobiographic occasionalism ====
Many of the Classical Chinese poems were written on the occasion of a certain event. This was generally expected to be a fairly spontaneous creation made just for that particular period of time, and sometimes with a fairly limited intended audience in mind. Examples include occasions of parting from a close friend for an extended period of time, expression of gratitude for a gift or act of someone, lamentations about current events, or even as a sort of game at social gatherings.

== Collections ==
Major collections of Classical Chinese poetry include the Shijing, the Chuci, the Complete Tang Poems, the New Songs from the Jade Terrace, the Three Hundred Tang Poems, the Tang era Wangchuan ji, and the poems collected from the Orchid Pavilion Gathering and the Midnight Songs poems from the Six Dynasties period .

== Influence ==
Classical Chinese poetry has been an influence both on modern Chinese poetry but also on the poetry of other languages. One group of languages on which Classical Chinese poetry had an early influence was the cultural exchange with various unrelated neighbouring language families that initiated diplomatic contact with Sinitic speakers. Such interaction happened with speakers of Austroasiatic, Japonic, Koreanic as well as Tungusic and Mongolic (Khitan in particular) languages. A more recent global influence has developed in modern times, including Beat poetry, exponents of which even produced translations of Classical Chinese poetry into English, such as Kenneth Rexroth (One Hundred Poems From the Chinese, 1956) and Gary Snyder (Riprap and Cold Mountain Poems, 1959, which includes translations of Hanshan).

=== Translation into English ===
Various translators have translated Classical Chinese poetry into English, including Ezra Pound—credited by T. S. Eliot with the "invention of Chinese poetry in our time"—as well as Arthur Waley, A. C. Graham, Kenneth Rexroth, Burton Watson, Jerome P. Seaton, and David Hinton.

== See also ==
- Chinese literary works (Category)
- Chinese literature, Classical poetry section
- Chinese poetry
- Chinese poetry (Category)
- Chinese Sanqu poetry
- Ci (poetry)
- Classical Chinese poetry forms
- Classical Chinese poetry genres
- Classic of Poetry
- Chuci
- Five Classics
- Fu (poetry)
- Han poetry
- History of Chinese art
- Japanese poetry
- Jueju
- Kanshi (poetry)
- Korean poetry
- List of Chinese language poets
- List of Classical Chinese poetry anthologies
- List of National Treasures of Japan (writings: Chinese books)
- Ming poetry
- Music Bureau
- Nineteen Old Poems
- Pailu
- Qing poetry
- Qu (poetry)
- Rime dictionary
- Rime table
- Sangluan
- Six dynasties poetry
- Shi (poetry)
- Song poetry
- Tang poetry
- Three perfections – integration of calligraphy, poetry and painting
- Tone pattern
- Verse (poetry)
- Vietnamese poetry
- Yongwu shi
- Yuan poetry
- Yuefu
