= Jueju =

Form of Chinese poetry

Chinese name
- Traditional Chinese: 絕句
- Simplified Chinese: 绝句
- Literal meaning: "cut-off lines"
Transcriptions
Standard Mandarin
- Hanyu Pinyin: juéjù
- Wade–Giles: chüeh^{2}-chü^{4}
- IPA: [tɕɥětɕŷ]
Yue: Cantonese
- Yale Romanization: jyuht-geui
- Jyutping: zyut6-geoi3
Southern Min
- Tâi-lô: tsua̍t-kù

Japanese name
- Kanji: 絶句
- Hiragana: ぜっく
Transcriptions
- Romanization: zekku

Jueju (traditional Chinese: 絕句; simplified Chinese: 绝句; pinyin: juéjù), or Chinese quatrain, is a type of jintishi ("modern form poetry") that grew popular among Chinese poets in the Tang dynasty (618–907), although traceable to earlier origins. Jueju poems are always quatrains; or, more specifically, a matched pair of couplets, with each line consisting of five or seven syllables.

The five-syllable form is called wujue (Chinese: 五絕; pinyin: Wǔjué) and the seven-syllable form qijue (七絕; Qījué).

== History ==
The origins of the jueju style are uncertain. Fränkel states that it arose from the yuefu form in the fifth or sixth century. This pentasyllabic song form, dominant in the Six Dynasties period, may have carried over into shi composition and thus created a hybrid of the yuefu quatrain and shi quatrain. Indeed, many Tang dynasty wujue poems were inspired by these yuefu songs.

In the seventh century the jueju developed into its modern form, as one of the three "modern" verse forms, or jintishi, the other two types of jintishi being the lüshi and the pailu.

The jueju style was very popular during the Tang dynasty. Many authors composing jueju poems at the time followed the concept of "seeing the big within the small" (Chinese: 小中見大; pinyin: Xiǎozhōng jiàndà), and thus wrote on topics of a grand scale; philosophy, religion, emotions, history, vast landscapes and more.

Authors known to have composed jueju poems include Du Fu, Du Mu, Li Bai, Li Shangyin, Wang Changling and Wang Wei.

== Form ==
Traditional literary critics considered the jueju style to be the most difficult form of jintishi. Limited to exactly 20 or 28 characters, writing a jueju requires the author to make full use of each character to create a successful poem. This proved to encourage authors to use symbolic language to a high degree.

Furthermore, tonal meter in jueju, as with other forms of Chinese poetry, is a complex process. It can be compared to the alternation of stressed and unstressed syllables in sonnets. A poet writing a jueju or similar lüshi-style poem needs to alternate level and oblique tones both between and within lines.

Some of the formal rules of the regulated verse forms were applied in the case of the jueju curtailed verse: these rules as applied to the jueju include regular line length, use of a single rhyme in even-numbered verses, strict patterning of tonal alternations, use of a major caesura before the last three syllables, optional parallelism and grammaticality of each line as a sentence. Each couplet generally forms a distinct unit, and the third line generally introduces some turn of thought or direction within the poem.

== Structure ==
Jueju follows one of the following tonal patterns:

Type I, Standard

| Additional in qijue | wujue | Rhyming |
| ○○ | ●●○○● | |
| ●● | ○○●●○ | ✓ |
| ●● | ○○○●● | |
| ○○ | ●●●○○ | ✓ |

Type II, Standard

| Additional in qijue | wujue | Rhyming |
| ●● | ○○○●● | |
| ○○ | ●●●○○ | ✓ |
| ○○ | ●●○○● | |
| ●● | ○○●●○ | ✓ |

Type I, Variant

| Additional in qijue | wujue | Rhyming |
| ○○ | ●●●○○ | ✓ |
| ●● | ○○●●○ | ✓ |
| ●● | ○○○●● | |
| ○○ | ●●●○○ | ✓ |

Type II, Variant

| Additional in qijue | wujue | Rhyming |
| ●● | ○○●●○ | ✓ |
| ○○ | ●●●○○ | ✓ |
| ○○ | ●●○○● | |
| ●● | ○○●●○ | ✓ |

○ is a character with a level tone, while ● is a character with an oblique tone (a rising, departing or entering tone).

== Example ==
This poem is called "Spring Lament" (Chinese: 春怨; pinyin: Chūn yuàn) and was written by Jin Changxu.

Traditional Chinese

春怨

打起黃鶯兒
莫教枝上啼
啼時驚妾夢
不得到遼西

Simplified Chinese

春怨

打起黄莺儿
莫教枝上啼
啼时惊妾梦
不得到辽西

English translation

"Spring Lament"

Hit the yellow oriole
Don't let it sing on the branches
When it sings, it breaks into my dreams
And keeps me from Liaoxi!

This poem concerns a standard figure in this type of poetry, a lonely woman who is despondent over the absence of a husband or lover, probably a soldier who has gone to Liaoxi in present-day Mongolia. She chases away the orioles to stop their singing in the first couplet. The second couplet gives the reason. The bird songs interrupted her sweet morning dream to see her husband in the far away land. The words and phrases tug at her heart.

== See also ==
- Ci (poetry)
- Classical Chinese poetry
- Fu (poetry)
- Lüshi (poetry)
- Qijue
- Quatrain
- "Quiet Night Thought"
- Qu (poetry)
- Regulated verse
- Shi (poetry)
- Shichigon-zekku
- Three Hundred Tang Poems
