= Pailü =

Pailü (Chinese: 排律; pinyin: páilǜ; Jyutping: paai4leot6) is one of the main forms of Classical Chinese poetry. It is a style of regulated verse (jintishi): the rules and regulations of the pailü allow for a poem composed of an unlimited series of linked couplets. The pailü form seems to have developed as part of 7th-century Tang poetry.

== See also ==
- Classical Chinese poetry forms
- Regulated verse
- Chinese poetry
- Chinese literature
