= Tangshi baimingjia quanji =

Collection of Chinese poetry

First page of volume five of Tangshi baimingjia quanji

Pages from an edition from the Harvard University

Tangshi baimingjia quanji (simplified Chinese: 唐诗百名家全集; traditional Chinese: 唐詩百名家全集), a collection of the "Complete/Collected Hundred Notable Masters of Tang Poetry", also known as Baijia Tangshi (百家唐诗) or Tangren baijia shi (唐人百家诗), is a comprehensive anthology of Tang poetry, compiled by the Qing dynasty bibliophile Xi Qiyu 席启寓 (1650–1702) in Suzhou and completed in the 47th year of the Kangxi reign (1708).

The collection includes the works by 100 poets from the Dali (766–779) era of the Tang dynasty up to the Five Dynasties period. It begins with Liu Zhangqing 刘长卿 and Qian Qi 钱起, and ends with the poets of the Five Dynasties, Wang Zhou 王周 and Wang Zhenbai 王贞白, arranged according to the year in which the authors passed the imperial examination. Prominent Tang poets such as Li Bai and Du Fu were deliberately excluded, as their works were already widely available. Each volume contains a brief biography of the poet, critical commentary by later scholars, and textual notes.

The anthology preserves numerous poems from the mid and late Tang periods, including pieces not found in the Quan Tangshi (Complete Tang Poems), and is notable for combining biography, commentary, and textual criticism into a single compilation format. It is regarded as an important source for the study of mid- and late-Tang poetry.

The Hanyu da zidian, for example, makes use of it for the works of the poets Lang Shiyuan 郎士元, Han Hong 韩翃, Gu Kuang 顾况, Dai Shulun 戴叔伦, Geng Wei 耿湋, Sikong Shu 司空曙, Lu Lun 卢纶, Zhang Ji 张继, Zhang Hu 张祜, Gu Feixiong 顾非熊, Yu Fen 于濆, Yu Fu 喻凫, Ma Dai 马戴, Fang Gan 方干, Luo Ye 罗邺, Cao Song 曹松, and Tang Yanqian 唐彥謙.

== See also ==
- Quan Tangshi (Complete Tang Poems)
- Tangshi sanbai shou (Three Hundred Tang Poems)
