= Qiu Wei =

Chinese poet

Qiu Wei (traditional Chinese: 邱為; simplified Chinese: 邱为; pinyin: Qiū Wéi, 694–789? was a Chinese poet during the Tang dynasty, with one of his poems being included in the famous anthology Three Hundred Tang Poems.

== Poetry ==
Qiu Wei's poetic career coincided with the major flourishing of the Tang poetry styles; within which, he was grouped in with the Fields and Gardens Poets Group (田园诗派), along with such poets as Meng Haoran, Wang Wei, Chang Jian, and Pei Di. He had one poem collected in Three Hundred Tang Poems; which is a five-character old-style (Gushi) of Classical Chinese poetry form, translated by Witter Bynner as "AFTER MISSING THE RECLUSE ON THE WESTERN MOUNTAIN".
