= Xie Lingyun =

Jin Dynasty poet

- 謝靈運
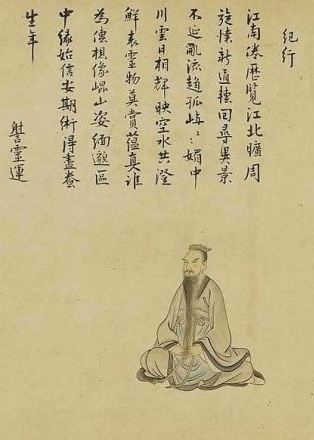
- Xie Lingyun, painted by Kanō Tsunenobu in the 18th century.
- Born: 385; Yangxia County, Henan, China
- Died: 433 (aged 47–48); Guangzhou, Guangdong, China
- Occupation: Poet
- Children: Xie Feng (son)
- Parent: Xie Huan (father)
- Relatives: Xie Yi (great grandfather); Xie Xuan (grandfather)

Chinese name
- Traditional Chinese: 謝靈運
- Simplified Chinese: 谢灵运
Transcriptions
Standard Mandarin
- Hanyu Pinyin: Xiè Língyùn
- Wade–Giles: Hsieh^{4} Ling^{2}-yün^{4}
- IPA: [ɕjê lǐŋŷn]
Yue: Cantonese
- Yale Romanization: Jeh Lèhng-wahn
- Jyutping: Ze^{6} Leng^{4}-wan^{6}
- IPA: [tsɛ˨ lɛŋ˩ wɐn˨]
Southern Min
- Tâi-lô: Tsiā Lîng-īn
Middle Chinese
- Middle Chinese: Zjä^{C} Leng-hjun^{C}

Alternative Chinese name
- Traditional Chinese: 康樂公
- Simplified Chinese: 康乐公
Transcriptions
Standard Mandarin
- Hanyu Pinyin: Kānglè Gōng

Xie Lingyun (Chinese: 謝靈運; Wade–Giles: Hsieh Ling-yün; 385–433) and also known as the Duke of Kangle (康樂公) was one of the foremost Chinese poets towards the end of the Southern and Northern Dynasties and continued in poetic fame through the beginning of the Six Dynasties, so Xie is also considered to be part of the Six Dynasties poetry era.

== Life ==
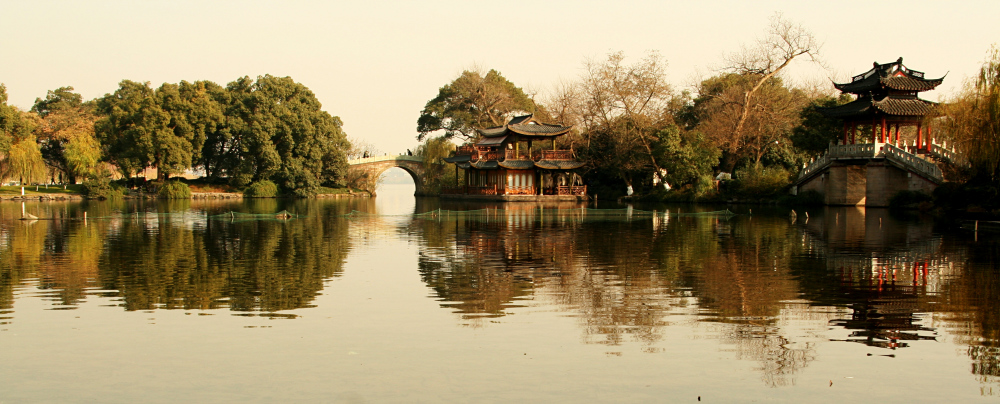

Xie Lingyun was a descendant of two of the most important families of the later Eastern Jin times, the Xie and the Wang families. His paternal grandfather was the general Xie Xuan, a general who is best known for repelling the Former Qin army at the Battle of Fei River, thus preventing the Former Qin emperor Fu Jiān from destroying Jin, and thus allowing the continuation of the southern dynastic kingdoms. His maternal grandmother was Wang Mengjiang, the only daughter of calligrapher, writer and politician Wang Xizhi.

=== Birth and youth ===
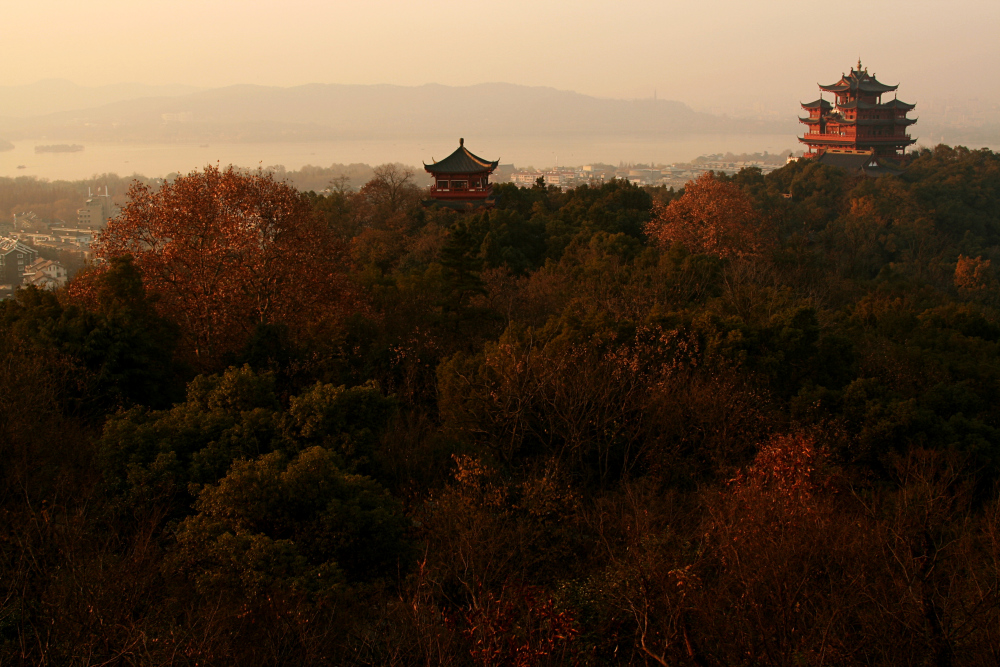
Chenghuang Pagoda Scenic Area, Hangzhou, China.

Xie Lingyun was born in Yangxia County, Henan, but his father died early. Xie Lingyun was consequently brought up by a Buddhist monk, Du Ming, in what was then Qiantang but now Hangzhou, a cosmopolitan metropolis at the southern end of the Grand Canal, a market nexus for maritime trade and transport to and from the north, and an area widely famed for its scenery with surrounding hills and the spectacular West Lake.

Although, returning home from the monastery in 399, when he would have been in his mid-teens, Xie retained a lifelong Buddhist practice. Furthermore, the family estate itself was a scenic wonder. Located in Shining (始寧) (modern Shangyu township, Shaoxing prefecture, Zhejiang province—but administered and named differently then), the estate had been carefully chosen by his grandfather, the successful general, both for esthetics of beauty and its seclusion, who then planned and laid it out according to his wishes. The estate included a significant hill to the north, upon which was the family homestead, and there was a matching hill to the south, each hill replete with its craggy cliffs and cascading streams: and, in between the two hills stood a lake. The family home on the northern hill had been terraced and developed with well-planned and situated orchards, gardens, walking paths, and ornate pavilions, all done with a mind to preserve and increase the viewer's pleasure: the southern hill during the youth of Xie Lingyun was left as somewhat of a wild preserve; but, between the two there was a whole range of fields and crops as well as wild plant and animal life.

Even the secluded family estate was not necessarily safe during these turbulent times; and, when a major rebellion broke out, the family abandoned their country living in favor of the relative safety of the capital city, Jiankang (modern Nanjing), for the four years of its course. The Xie family received official residence in a mansion and luxurious entertainment for the time. The young duke (having inherited the title when his father died) was well off financially (having also inherited the three thousand household fiefdom which went with the ducal title) and was skilled in the expected literary abilities; which, altogether, went towards placing him in the highlight of the capital's social scene, and (with the family connections) also thus appearing to be at the beginning of a successful official career.

=== Career ===
Xie Lingyun served as an official in the Eastern Jin, during which time the rebellion was quashed by general Liu Yu; however, this would turn out to be just a step in general Liu's career, later on he would overthrow the Eastern Jin dynasty and establish the Liu Song dynasty, as Emperor Wu. The Xie family backed an alternative general, and the factional intrigues went on for years, before and after the eventual triumph of the Liu as the Liu Song dynasty. Liu Yu gained more and more power, at the expense of the Xie and the other old families, but at first was content to have the services of Xie Lingyun, nominally as an official of Jin. However, in the year 420 Liu Yu declared the end of Jin and the beginning of his new dynasty, the Liu Song. At this point, as an official in the Liu Song government, Xie Lingyun received a demotion, to marquis, with only 500 households in fee. He then was demoted to a position in a remote area, and so effectively exiled, to Yongjia (永嘉, modern Wenzhou in Zhejiang). Yongjia was a coastal seaport surrounded by scenic hills, and the setting for Xie Lingyun's Yongjia poetic period, when he wrote some of his finest poems. After a year in office here, however, Xie claiming health problems, resigned and returned home to the family estate in Shangyu.

=== Retiring to South Hill ===
After returning home to the family estate in Shining (Shangyu), where he spent considerable time attending to the previously undeveloped or cultivated South Hill, which may also be known as "South Mountain". Here he went on long exploratory expeditions, accompanied by dozens of servants, who often had to hack a way through the more densely vegetated areas: Xie Lingyun is also famed for having invented and used a type of wooden boots with spikes which he could remove or adjust depending on whether he was on level ground or on an up or down slope. His poems from this period made it to the capital city where they were popularly read, and the poems from his Shining period remain among his long lasting accomplishments. Some of the descriptions of and names for the locations of poetic occasions on his estate can be seen to be directly influential on the forty poems of the Wangchuan ji (also known as the Wang or Wheel River Collection) written by Wang Wei and Pei Di, in regards to Wang Wei's Tang Dynasty retirement estate at Lantian, south of the contemporary capital Chang'an (modern Xi'an in Shaanxi province).

=== Back in office, exile, and death ===
Meanwhile, the political changes went on unabated, and Xie once again became enmeshed in them. In 426, the new sovereign summoned him to court, where he spent two years with no real duty or power, but rather as a token to display loyalty: he then left for two years, but came back in 430 to defend himself against charges placed by his local prefect. In 431, he was relegated to what is now Fuzhou in Jiangxi, then the next year further exiled to Guangzhou: Xie Lingyun was then sentenced to death on a pretext, in 433, at which point he wrote his final poem, lamenting that his death was not to be on one of his beloved hilltops; and, then was executed.

== Poetry ==
Xie Lingyun has been considered a nature or landscape poet focusing on the "mountain and streams", in contrast to the "field and garden" landscape poetry. His poetry is allusive and complex, with possible Buddhist influence.

=== Formal technique ===
Xie was influenced by a tradition of fu-style poetry, or literature. The Fu tradition often included eloquent descriptions of the beauties of nature; indeed, Xie himself wrote his renowned "Fu on returning to the Mountains" in this style: however, Xie's breakthrough was to distill the essence of this type of Fu and adapt and compress it into the shi more purely poetic form.

=== Influence ===
Hailed as the progenitor of the Chinese landscape poetry genre (shanshui poetry), the reputation of Xie Lingyun as a great poet remains secure, as it has for over a thousand years. The Wangchuan ji by Wang Wei and Pei Di which describes the landscape features of Wang's estate near Chang'an particularly shows the influence of Xie Lingyun's poetry describing the landscape features of his estate near West Lake.

== See also ==
- Classical Chinese poetry
- List of Chinese authors
- Mahayana Mahaparinirvana Sutra
- Shanshui poetry
- Six Dynasties poetry
- Wang Hong
- Xie Tiao
- Zhejiang

== Bibliography ==
- Chang, H. C. (1977). Chinese Literature 2: Nature Poetry. (New York: Columbia University Press). ISBN 0-231-04288-4
- Shen, Yucheng, "Xie Lingyun". Encyclopedia of China (Chinese Literature Edition), 1st ed.
- Watson, Burton (1971). CHINESE LYRICISM: Shih Poetry from the Second to the Twelfth Century. (New York: Columbia University Press). ISBN 0-231-03464-4
- Xiong, Victor Cunrui (2017). Historical Dictionary of Medieval China (2nd ed.). Lanham, Maryland; New York City; London: Rowman & Littlefield.
