= Three Hundred Tang Poems =

Chinese poem from the Tang dynasty (618–907)

- Traditional Chinese: 唐詩三百首
- Simplified Chinese: 唐诗三百首
Transcriptions
Standard Mandarin
- Hanyu Pinyin: Tángshī sānbǎi shǒu
- Wade–Giles: T'ang-shih san-pai-shou
- Yale Romanization: Tángshr̄ sānbái shǒu
- IPA: [tʰǎŋʂɻ̩́ sánpǎɪ ʂòʊ]
Yue: Cantonese
- Yale Romanization: Tòhngsī sāambaak sáu
- Jyutping: Tong4 si1 saam1 baak3 sau2
- IPA: [tʰɔ̏ːŋɕíː sáːmpāːk sɐ̌u]
Southern Min
- Hokkien POJ: Tông-si saⁿ-pah-chhiú

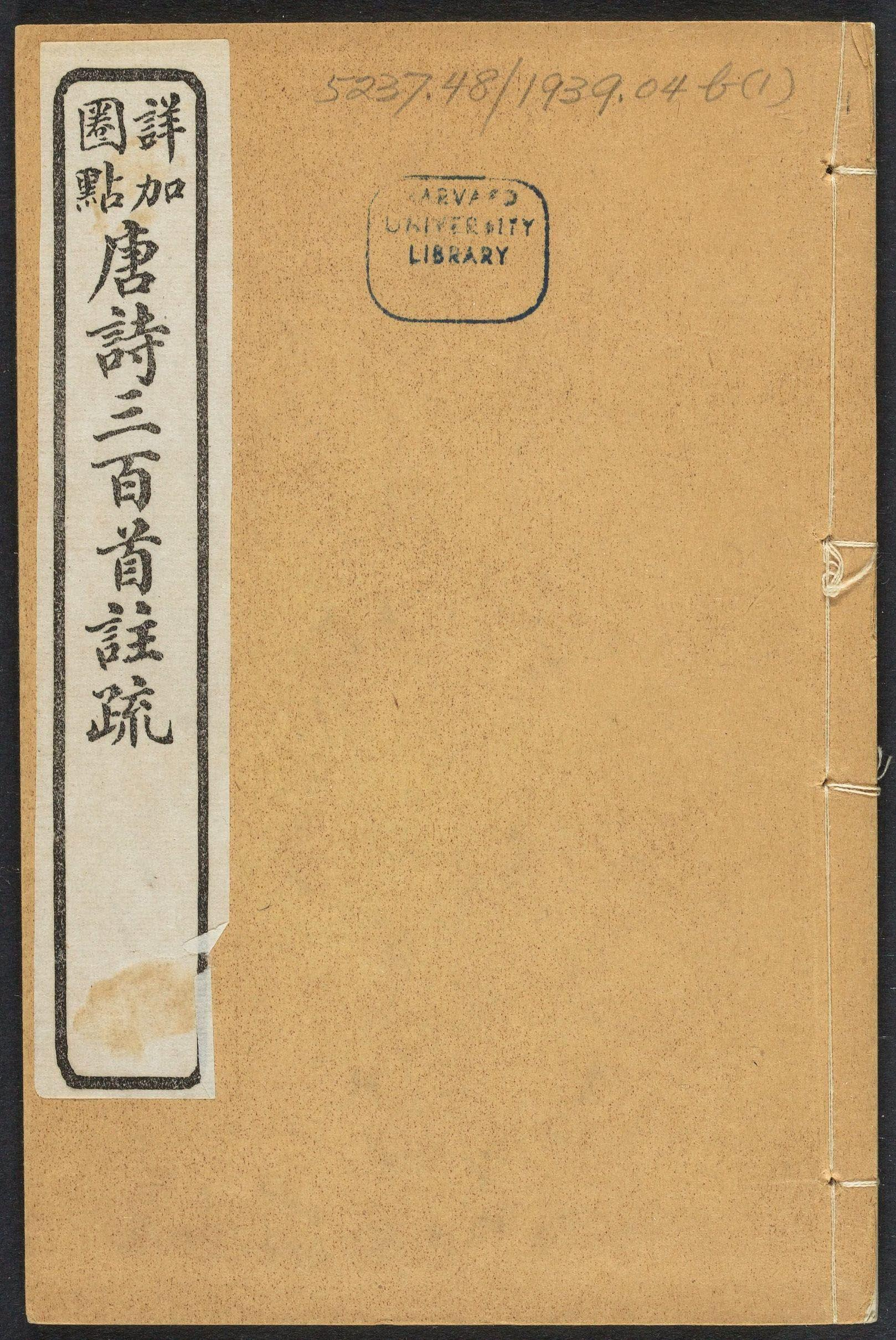
A 1930s edition of the anthology

The Three Hundred Tang Poems is an anthology of poems from the Chinese Tang dynasty (618–907). It was first compiled around 1763 by Sun Zhu (1722–1778), who was a Qing Dynasty scholar and was also known as Hengtang Tuishi (蘅塘退士, "Retired Master of Hengtang"). Various later editions also exist. All editions contain slightly more than 300 total poems. The number 300 (or more exactly 305) was a classic number for a poetry collection due to the influence of the Classic of Poetry (詩經, Shijing), which was generally known as The Three Hundred Poems.

Dissatisfied with the anthology Poems by a Thousand Masters (千家詩, Qianjiashi) compiled by Liu Kezhuang in the late Southern Song, and influenced by Ming Dynasty poetry anthologies, Sun selected the poems based on their popularity and educational value. The collection has been popular ever since and can be found in many Chinese households. For centuries, elementary students memorized the poems and used them to learn to read and write. It contains poems by Du Fu, Li Bai, Wang Wei, Chen Zi'ang, Meng Haoran, Han Yu, Du Mu, Bai Juyi, Liu Zhangqing, Cen Shen, Wang Changling, Wei Yingwu, and more.

== Organization of poems ==
The original Qing Dynasty version of the 300 Tang Poems was organized by the poem's formal type, of which there were seven:

- Folk song-styled verse (yuefu)
- Ancient verse (gushi):
  - Five-character ancient verse
  - Seven-character ancient verse
- Modern-style verse (jintishi):
  - Eight-line regulated verse (lüshi):
    - Five-character regular verse
    - Seven-character regular verse
  - Quatrain (jueju):
    - Five-character quatrain
    - Seven-character quatrain

Out of 317 poems in one edition, 90 were in the gushi form and 227 were in the lüshi or the jueju forms.

== Poets ==
The poets of the Tang shi include a number of authors ranging from the well-known and famous to obscure or anonymous poets, and even include at least one emperor. The poet with the most pieces included in this collection is Du Fu, with thirty-nine. Li Bai is a close runner-up, with thirty-four. Wang Wei has twenty-nine poems included in the anthology and Li Shangyin has twenty-four. Meng Haoran has fifteen, Wei Yingwu twelve, Liu Zhangqing eleven, and Du Mu ten. After that, each of the other poets' included pieces number in the single digits; however, some of these poets are quite important, such as Liu Zongyuan or Bai Juyi. Some important poets, such as Li He, are not represented at all.

| Name | Traditional | Simplified | Pinyin | Wade-Giles (Note: Lacking tone marks, and may be modified Wade-Giles.) | Dates (Note: Birth, death, flourishing, or other as available. All dates Common Era.) | Number of included pieces (Note: From standard edition(s).) |
|---|---|---|---|---|---|---|
| Bai Juyi | 白居易 | 白居易 | Bái Jūyì | Po Chü-i | 772–846 | 6 |
| Cao Song | 曹松 | 曹松 | Cáo Sōng | Ts'ao Sung | 830-903 | 1 |
| Cen Shen | 岑參 | 岑参 | Cén Shēn | Ts'en Shen | 715–770 | 7 |
| Chang Jian | 常建 | 常建 | Cháng Jiàn | Ch'ang Chien | 708–765? | 2 |
| Chen Tao | 陳陶 | 陈陶 | Chén Táo | Ch'en T'ao | 824–882 | 1 |
| Chen Zi'ang | 陳子昂 | 陈子昂 | Chén Zǐáng | Ch'en Tzǔ-ang | 661?–702 | 1 |
| Cui Daorong | 崔道融 | 崔道融 | Cuī Dào Róng | Ts'ui Tao-jong | 880-907 | 3 |
| Cui Hao | 崔顥 | 崔颢 | Cuī Hào | Ts'ui Hao | 704?–754 | 4 |
| Cui Hu | 崔護 | 崔护 | Cuī Hù | Ts'ui Hu | 772-846 | 1 |
| Cui Shu | 崔曙 | 崔曙 | Cuī Shǔ | Ts'ui Shu | 704–739 | 1 |
| Cui Tu | 崔塗 | 崔涂 | Cuī Tú | Ts'ui T'u | 854–? | 2 |
| Dai Shulun | 戴叔倫 | 戴叔伦 | Dài Shūlún | Tai Shu-lun | 732–789 | 1 |
| Du Fu | 杜甫 | 杜甫 | Dù Fǔ | Tu Fu | 712–770 | 39 |
| Du Mu | 杜牧 | 杜牧 | Dù Mù | Tu Mu | 803–852 | 10 |
| Du Qiuniang (Lady Du Qiu) | 杜秋娘 | 杜秋娘 | Dù Qiūniáng | Tu Ch'iu-niang | ?–825? | 1 |
| Du Shenyan | 杜審言 | 杜审言 | Dù Shěnyán | Tu Shen-yen | 646–708? | 1 |
| Du Xunhe | 杜荀鶴 | 杜荀鹤 | Dù Xúnhè | Tu Hsün-hê | 846–904 | 1 |
| Gao Pian | 高駢 | 高骈 | Gāo Pián | Kao Pian | 821-887 | 1 |
| Gao Shi | 高適 | 高适 | Gāo Shì | Kao Shi | 716?–765 | 2 |
| Gu Kuang | 顧況 | 顾况 | Gù Kuàng | Ku K'uang | 725—814 | 1 |
| Han Hong | 韓翃 | 韩翃 | Hán Hóng | Han Hung | 754?-784? | 3 |
| Han Wo | 韓偓 | 韩偓 | Hán Wò | Han Wo | 844–923 | 1 |
| Han Yu | 韓愈 | 韩愈 | Hán Yù | Han Yü | 768–824 | 4 |
| He Zhizhang | 賀知章 | 贺知章 | Hè Zhīzhāng | He Chih-chang | 659?–744 | 1 |
| Hu Lingneng | 胡令能 | 胡令能 | Hú Lìngnéng | Hu Ling-Neng | 785-826 | 1 |
| Huangfu Ran | 皇甫冉 | 皇甫冉 | Huángfǔ Rǎn | Huang-fu Jan | 716–769 | 1 |
| Jia Dao | 賈島 | 贾岛 | Jiǎ Dǎo | Chia Tao | 779–843 | 1 |
| Jiaoran | 皎然 | 皎然 | Jiǎorán | Chiao-jan | 730–799 | 1 |
| Jin Changxu | 金昌緒 | 金昌绪 | Jīn Chāngxù | Chin Ch'ang-hsü | ? | 1 |
| Li Bai (Li Po) | 李白 | 李白 | Lǐ Bái (Lǐ Bó) | Li Pai (Li Po) | 701–762 | 34 |
| Li Duan | 李端 | 李端 | Lǐ Duān | Li Tuan | 743–782 | 1 |
| Li He | 李賀 | 李贺 | Lǐ Hè | Li He | 790-816 | 2 |
| Li Pin | 李頻 | 李频 | Lǐ Pín | Li P'in | 818–876 | 1 |
| Li Qi | 李頎 | 李颀 | Lǐ Qí | Li Ch'i | 690–751 | 7 |
| Li Qiao | 李峤 | 李嶠 | Lǐ Qiào | Li Ch'iao | 645-714 | 2 |
| Li Shangyin | 李商隱 | 李商隐 | Lǐ Shāngyǐn | Li Shang-yin | 813?–858? | 24 |
| Li Shen | 李紳 | 李绅 | Lǐ Shēn | Li Shen | 772-846 | 1 |
| Li Yi | 李益 | 李益 | Lǐ Yì | Li I | 748?–827? | 3 |
| Liu Fangping | 劉方平 | 刘方平 | Liú Fāngping | Liu Fang-p'ing | mid 8th century | 2 |
| Liu Shenxu | 劉眘虛 | 刘眘虚 | Liú Shènxū | Liu Shen-hsü | early 8th century | 1 |
| Liu Yuxi | 劉禹錫 | 刘禹锡 | Liú Yǔxī | Liu Yü-hsi | 772–842 | 4 |
| Liu Zhangqing | 劉長卿 | 刘长卿 | Liú Zhǎngqīng | Liu Chang-ch'ing | 710?–789? | 11 |
| Liu Zhongyong | 柳中庸 | 柳中庸 | Liǔ Zhōngyōng | Liu Chung-yung | ?–775? | 1 |
| Liu Zongyuan | 柳宗元 | 柳宗元 | Liǔ Zōngyuán | Liu Tsung-yüan | 773–819 | 5 |
| Lu Lun | 盧綸 | 卢纶 | Lú Lún | Lu Lun | 739–799 | 6 |
| Lu Guimeng | 陸龜蒙 | 陆龟蒙 | Lù Guīméng | Lu Kui-meng | ?-881 | 1 |
| Luo Binwang | 駱賓王 | 骆宾王 | Luò Bīnwáng | Lo Pin-wang | 640?–684? | 1 |
| Luo Yin | 羅隱 | 罗隐 | Luó Yǐn | Lo Yin | 833-910 | 2 |
| Ma Dai | 馬戴 | 马戴 | Mǎ Dài | Ma Tai | 799–869 | 2 |
| Meng Haoran | 孟浩然 | 孟浩然 | Mèng Hàorán | Meng Hao-jan | 689?–740 | 15 |
| Meng Jiao | 孟郊 | 孟郊 | Mèng Jiāo | Meng Chiao | 751–814 | 2 |
| Nie Yizhong | 聶夷中 | 聂夷中 | Niè Yízhōng | Nie YiChong | 837-884 | 1 |
| Pei Di | 裴迪 | 裴迪 | Péi Dí | Pei Ti | 716?–? | 1 |
| Qian Qi | 錢起 | 钱起 | Qián Qǐ | Ch'ien Ch'i | 722?–780? | 3 |
| Qin Taoyu | 秦韜玉 | 秦韬玉 | Qín Tāoyù | Ch'in T'ao-yü | late 9th century | 1 |
| Qiu Wei | 邱為 | 邱为 | Qiū Wéi | Ch'iu Wei | 694–789? | 1 |
| Qiwu Qian | 綦毋潛 | 綦毋潜 | Qíwú Qián | Ch'i-wu Ch'ien | 692?–755? | 1 |
| Quan Deyu | 權德輿 | 权德舆 | Quán Déyú | Ch'uan Tê-yu | 759–818 | 1 |
| Rong Yu | 戎昱 | 戎昱 | Róng Yù | Jong Yu | 740-800 | 2 |
| Shen Quanqi | 沈佺期 | 沈佺期 | Shěn Quánqī | Shên Ch'üan-ch'i | 650?–713? | 2 |
| Shi Jianwu | 施肩吾 | 施肩吾 | Shī Jiānwú | Shi Chuan'wu | 780-861 | 1 |
| Sikong Shu | 司空曙 | 司空曙 | Sī Kōngshǔ | Ssû-k'ung Shu | 720?–790? | 3 |
| Song Zhiwen | 宋之問 | 宋之问 | Sòng Zhīwèn | Sung Chih-wên | 656?–712? | 1 |
| Tang Xuanzong | 唐玄宗 | 唐玄宗 | Táng Xuánzōng | T'ang Hsüan-tsung | 685–762 | 1 |
| Wang Bo | 王勃 | 王勃 | Wáng Bó | Wang Po | 649?–676 | 1 |
| Wang Changling | 王昌齡 | 王昌龄 | Wáng Chānglíng | Wang Ch'ang-ling | 698–756 | 8 |
| Wang Han | 王翰 | 王翰 | Wáng Hàn | Wang Han | 687-726 | 1 |
| Wang Jia | 王駕 | 王驾 | Wáng Jià | Wang Chia | 851-? | 2 |
| Wang Jian | 王建 | 王建 | Wáng Jiàn | Wang Chien | ?–830? | 1 |
| Wang Wan | 王灣 | 王湾 | Wáng Wān | Wang Wan | 693–751 | 1 |
| Wang Wei | 王維 | 王维 | Wáng Wéi | Wang Wei | 699–759 | 29 |
| Wang Ya | 王涯 | 王涯 | Wáng Yá | Wang Ya | ？-835 | 1 |
| Wang Zhihuan | 王之渙 | 王之涣 | Wáng Zhīhuàn | Wang Tsu-huan | 688–742 | 2 |
| Wei Yingwu | 韋應物 | 韦应物 | Wéi Yìngwù | Wei Ying-wu | 737–792 | 12 |
| Wei Zhuang | 韋莊 | 韦庄 | Wéi Zhuāng | Wei Chuang | 836–910 | 2 |
| Wen Tingyun | 溫庭筠 | 温庭筠 | Wēn Tíngyún | Wen T'ing-yun | 812–870 | 4 |
| Wu Mingshi (Anonymous) | 無名氏 | 无名氏 | Wúmíngshì | Wu-ming-shih | ? | 1 |
| Xi Biren (Anonymous) (Note: Xi Biren is an alias meaning "humble person from the west border". The author is unknown (cf. "China Tang poetry Tang Poems, Kanshi, 唐詩英訳 漢詩 英译唐诗 英译唐诗雙語 唐诗英译 唐诗英译雙語, 英譯唐詩 唐詩英譯雙語 唐詩英訳 Tang Poems, English translation, bilingual 如何在美国亞瑪遜/美亞 買书? 唐诗三百首中的精华者 - 25首, 中英双语对照, 附历史背景, 诗歌轶事, 诗人小传. How to purchase books at US amazon.com? Tang Poems, the most popular Chinese poems in Tang dynasty. China poems - Tang poems China history - Tang dynasty history - embedded in Tang poems. 唐時代に最も人気のある中国の詩である唐詩は、 Tang-Gedichte, die beliebtesten chinesischen Gedichte in der Tang-Dynastie. Les poèmes Tang, les plus populaires des poèmes chinois de la dynastie Tang. Poesie Tang, le poesie cinesi più popolari nella dinastia Tang. 당나라시에서 가장 인기있는 중국 시인시. Tang thơ, những bài thơ nổi tiếng nhất của Trung Quốc trong triều đại nhà Đường". Message #1 (in Latin). 2016-01-01."The Beauty of Tang Poems and Zhuan Zi Calligraphy", "Xi Bi'ren", by Marie L. Sun and Alex K. Sun)) | 西鄙人 | 西鄙人 | Xī Bǐrén | Hsi-pi Jen | ? | 1 |
| Xu Hun | 許渾 | 许浑 | Xǔ Hún | Hsü Hun | 791–858 | 2 |
| Xue Feng | 薛逢 | 薛逢 | Xuē Féng | Hsueh Feng | mid 9th century | 1 |
| Yu Hu | 於鵠 | 于鹄 | Yú Hú | Yü Hu | ?-814? | 3 |
| Yu Shinan | 虞世南 | 虞世南 | Yù Shìnán | Yü Shi-Nan | 558-638 | 2 |
| Yuan Jie | 元結 | 元结 | Yuán Jiē | Yüan Chieh | 723–772 | 2 |
| Yuan Zhen | 元稹 | 元稹 | Yuán Zhěn | Yüan Chen | 779–831 | 4 |
| Zhang Hu | 張祜 | 张祜 | Zhāng Hù | Chang Hu | 785–849? | 5 |
| Zhang Ji from Hubei | 張繼 | 张继 | Zhāng Jì | Chang Chi | 715?–779? | 1 |
| Zhang Ji from Jiangnan | 張籍 | 张籍 | Zhāng Jí | Chang Chi | 766–830? | 1 |
| Zhang Jiuling | 張九齡 | 张九龄 | Zhāng Jiǔlíng | Chang Chiu-ling | 678?–740 | 5 |
| Zhang Bi | 張泌 | 张泌 | Zhāng Bì | Chang Mi | late 9th century | 1 |
| Zhang Qiao | 張喬 | 张喬 | Zhāng Qiáo | Chang Ch'iao | ? | 1 |
| Zhang Xu | 張旭 | 张旭 | Zhāng Xù | Chang Hsü | 658?–747? | 1 |
| Zhang Yue | 張說 | 张说 | Zhāng Yuè | Chang Yüe | 667-731 | 1 |
| Zhang Zhihe | 張志和 | 张志和 | Zhāng Zhìhé | Chang Chi'he | 732-774 | 1 |
| Zhang Zhongsu | 張仲素 | 张仲素 | Zhāng Zhōngsù | Chang Chong'su | 769-819 | 2 |
| Zheng Gu | 鄭谷 | 郑谷 | Zhèng Gǔ | Cheng Hu | 849-911 | 1 |
| Zheng Tian | 鄭畋 | 郑畋 | Zhèng Tián | Cheng T'ien | 824?–882? | 1 |
| Zhu Qingyu | 朱慶餘 | 朱庆余 | Zhū Qìngyú | Chu Ch'ing-yü | early 9th century | 2 |
| Zu Yong | 祖詠 | 祖咏 | Zǔ Yǒng | Tsu Yung | 699–746? | 2 |

== Translations ==
The first complete translation of the Three Hundred Tang Poems into English was published as The Jade Mountain, translated by Witter Bynner and Jiang Kanghu. From 1929 through 1972 it went through ten editions. A new translation of the anthology by Peter Harris was published in 2009.

== See also ==
- Classical Chinese poetry
- Gao Bing
- List of poems in Chinese or by Chinese poets
- Tang poetry
- Qing poetry
- Complete Tang Poems
- Sun Zhu

== Sources ==
- Wu, John C. H. (1972). The Four Seasons of Tang Poetry. Rutland, Vermont: Charles E. Tuttle. ISBN 978-0-8048-0197-3
- Watson, Burton (1971). CHINESE LYRICISM: Shih Poetry from the Second to the Twelfth Century. (New York: Columbia University Press). ISBN 0-231-03464-4
- Rexroth, Kenneth (1970). Love and the Turning Year: One Hundred More Poems from the Chinese. New York: New Directions.
- Yu, Pauline (2002). "Chinese Poetry and Its Institutions", in Hsiang Lectures on Chinese Poetry, Volume 2, Grace S. Fong, editor. Montreal: Center for East Asian Research, McGill University.
