= Return to the Field =

Poem written by Zhang Heng

Return to the Field (歸田賦 Gui tian fu) is a literary work written in the Chinese style known as a rhapsody, or fu style: it is by Zhang Heng (AD 78–139), an official, inventor, mathematician, and astronomer of the Han dynasty of China (202 BC–220 AD). Zhang's Return to the Field is a seminal work in the Fields and Gardens poetry genre which helped to sparked centuries of poetic enthusiasm for poems of various forms which share a common theme of nature foremost with human beings and human thought seemingly not in main focus, somewhat similar to the Landscape poetry genre; however, in the case of the Fields and Gardens genre, nature was focused upon in its more domestic manifestation, paying homage to the appearance of nature in gardens, as found in backyards, and cultivated in the countryside. Return to the Field also invokes traditional themes of Classical Chinese poetry involving nature versus society.

== Background ==
Return to the Field was written as Zhang rejoicefully went into retirement in 138, after retiring from the corrupted politics of the capital Luoyang and then serving a post as administrator over Hejian Kingdom. His poem reflected the life he wished to lead in retirement while emphasizing markedly Daoist ideas over his Confucian background. Liu Wu-chi writes that by combining Daoist ideas with Confucian ones, Zhang's poem "heralded the metaphysical verse and nature poetry of the later centuries." In the rhapsody, Zhang also explicitly mentions the sage of Daoism, Laozi (fl. 6th century BC), as well as Confucius (6th century BC), the Duke of Zhou (fl. 11th century BC), and the Three Sovereigns.

== Rhapsody selection ==
A section about spring in Zhang Heng's rhapsody, translated in Liu Wu-chi's book An Introduction to Chinese Literature (1990), reads as thus:

Then comes young spring, in a fine month,
When the wind is mild and the air clear.
Plains and swamps are overgrown with verdure
And the hundred grasses become rank and thick.
The kingly osprey flaps its wings;
The orioles wail mournfully—
Their necks entwined, fluttering,
They call to each other in tender notes.
Thus happily I roam and play,
My feelings to cherish:
I am like a dragon chanting on the moor
Or a tiger roaring in the mountain.
I gaze up and let loose the slender bowstring;
Looking down, I fish in a long stream.
The loitering bird, struck by the arrow,
Drops from the clouds.
And the shark, hooked for greediness,
I suspended in the watery abyss.
Meanwhile, the radiant sun has slanted its shadow
And is overtaken by the moon charioteer.
Entranced by the supreme joy of rambling,
I forget all weariness even as the sun sets.
Moved by the precept handed down by Laozi,
I wend my back to the thatched cottage.
I pluck the five strings with deft fingers;
I read the book of Zhou and Kong.
I flourish my pen and invoke elegant words
To expound the patterns of the Three Emperors.
If one but let one's heart roam beyond this realm,
Why should one know the semblance of honor and disgrace?

Zhang Heng

== See also ==
- Classical Chinese poetry
- Fu (poetry)
- Han poetry
