= Jeen Ded Dokmai =

- by Sirindhorn
- Original title: จีนเด็ดดอกไม้
- Written: May 1990
- Language: Thai, Chinese
- Form: Ci, wujue
- Lines: 16

Jeen Ded Dokmai (Thai: จีนเด็ดดอกไม้; Chinese: 採桃花, lit. 'Picking on Peach Blossom'), originally titled Inspiration from Reading Meng Haoran's Poem (Chinese: 讀孟浩然詩感興), it is a Thai poem divided into four sections. It was written by Princess Sirindhorn in 1990 and translated into Chinese by Pei Xiaorui (裴曉睿), a Thai language professor at Peking University, in 1996.

Jeen Ded Dokmai was first included in Yok Sai Ray Kham translated by Princess Sirindhorn. The first paragraph is a translation of Meng Haoran's poem A Spring Morning (春曉), and the last three paragraphs are poems written by the princess herself based on the style of the original. The last sentence is a blessing poem praising the friendship between China and Thailand, among which "The brotherhood between China and Thailand will last for thousands of years" (Thai: จะเป็นจีนเป็นไทยใช่ใครอื่น จงชมชื่นผูกจิตสนิทมั่น; Chinese: 中泰手足情，綿延千秋好) is widely circulated.

== Background ==
Princess Sirindhorn wrote in a letter to a friend on July 26, 1987, that she saw the poem A Spring Morning on the wall when she visited a collection room of Chinese cultural relics in a museum in Australia but she didn't remember the city, and then translated the poem into Thai. Later, when the conductor of the Phatyarat Orchestra (วงดนตรีพาทยรัตน์) asked Princess Sirindhorn to give her the Chinese-style Thai classical music Jeen Ded Dokmai, A Spring Morning became the first verse of Jeen Ded Dokmai.

Princess Sirindhorn then added three more lyrics after A Spring Morning to match the style of the lyrics of Jeen Ded Dokmai. She wrote, "All good flowers are good tools to express the soul, and the purpose of picking flowers is to give them to each other and enhance the friendship between China and Thailand." In early May 1990, Princess Sirindhorn completed the lyrics of Jeen Ded Dokmai. In 1996, Pei Xiaorui translated the last three verses of Jeen Ded Dokmai into Chinese.
