= Chen Zi'ang =

Chinese poet

- 陳子昂
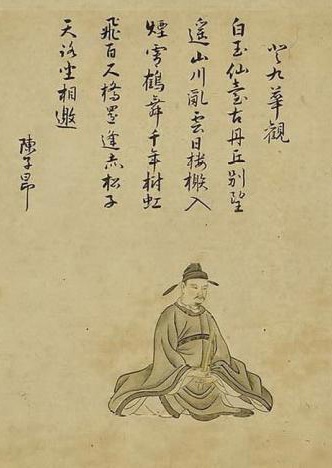
- Chen Zi'ang, painted by Kanō Tsunenobu in the 18th century.
- Born: 661 or 656; Shehong County, Sichuan, China
- Died: 702 (aged 40–41); 702 (aged 45–46); Shehong County, Sichuan, China
- Occupations: Poet, politician

Chinese name
- Traditional Chinese: 陳子昂
- Simplified Chinese: 陈子昂
Transcriptions
Standard Mandarin
- Hanyu Pinyin: Chén Zĭ'áng
- Wade–Giles: Ch‛en^{2} Tzŭ^{3}-ang^{2}
- IPA: [ʈʂʰə̌n tsɹ̩̀.ǎŋ]
Yue: Cantonese
- Yale Romanization: Chàhn Jí-ngòhng
- Jyutping: Can^{4} Zi^{2}-ngong^{4}
- IPA: [tsʰɐn˩ tsi˧˥ ŋɔŋ˩]

Courtesy name
- Chinese: 伯玉
Transcriptions
Standard Mandarin
- Hanyu Pinyin: Bóyù

Chen Zi'ang (Chinese: 陳子昂, 661 (or 656)–702), courtesy name Boyu (伯玉), was a Chinese poet of the Tang dynasty. He was important in helping to bring into being the type of poetry which is considered to be characteristically "Tang". Dissatisfied with the current state of poetry at the time, he helped, almost paradoxically, to usher in a new age of Chinese poetry by keeping his eye on remote antiquity. He would soon be followed by such poets of the golden age of Tang poetry as Wang Wei, Li Bai, and Du Fu.

== Biography ==
A native of Shehong County in modern Sichuan province, Chen Zi'ang was the son of a rich man, and did not travel to the imperial capital to take his exams until he was in his twenties. He completed the Jinshi level of the Imperial Examination at age twenty-four.

Having arrived in the city of Chang'an, Chen succeeded in calling attention to his poetry by expensive and elaborate means. With a flourish that startled onlookers in the city marketplace, he began by paying the asking price of a million kaiyuan tongbao for a Tartar musical instrument. Then, responding to intense curiosity among the crowd, he claimed to be an expert at playing that instrument and invited everyone to see him perform the next day. The next day he arranged a lavish feast in preparation. Rather than performing any music, however, he got up and, introducing himself as a poet and essayist, proceeded to smash to bits the musical instrument for which he had paid so much. He then handed out copies of his works, including his Thirty-Eight Lyrics.

As an important advisor to the Empress Wu Zetian, Chen was a firm advocate of poetry reflecting real life, and with his active interest in politics, much of his work includes suggestions of social commentary. Some have suggested that it was because of his work that he suffered persecution at the hands of Wu Sansi; he died in 702, having been in and out of prison for a number of years.

== Poetry and Works ==
A letter from Chen to a friend shows his attitude as a formative poet of the Early Period of Tang poetry:

The art of letters has been declining for five hundred years ... In my leisure hours, I have looked into the poems of the Ch'i and Liang Dynasties, and I could not help sighing when I found all genuine feeling and insight were smothered by meaningless figures of speech and a squeamish refinement of words. So much rhetoric and so little sentiment! When will the grand tradition of Shih Ching revive?

Chen Zi'ang is especially well known for "Ganyu" (感遇, his collection of thirty-eight poems, heavily influenced by Daoism and written in a simpler vocabulary than was typical of poetry of that time. His poem "Deng Youzhou Tai Ge" (登幽州臺歌) was collected in the Three Hundred Tang Poems. It was translated by Witter Bynner as "On a Gate-tower at Yuzhou."
