= Liu Fangping =

Tang dynasty poet

Liu Fangping (Chinese: 劉方平) (c.742 in Luoyang – c.779) was a Tang dynasty poet. Among twenty-six extant poems Moonlit Night (月夜) and Spring Grief (春怨) are among the best known.

== 300 Tang Poems ==
The Three Hundred Tang Poems is an anthology of poems from the Chinese Tang dynasty (618–907) first compiled in or around the year 1763 by Sun Zhu (1722–1778), a Qing dynasty era scholar, who was also known as Hengtang Tuishi (衡塘退士 "Retired Master of Hengtang"). The inclusion of 2 of Liu Fangping's poems in this popular and best-selling collection of poetry gives proof of this poet's notability.

== See also ==
- Classical Chinese poetry
- List of Three Hundred Tang Poems poets
- Tang poetry
- Three Hundred Tang Poems
