= Zu Yong =

Chinese poet

- Traditional Chinese: 祖詠
- Simplified Chinese: 祖咏
- Literal meaning: (given name)
Transcriptions
Standard Mandarin
- Hanyu Pinyin: Zǔ Yǒng
- Wade–Giles: Tsu^{3} Yung^{3}

Zu Yong (699–746?) was a Chinese poet of the High Tang period. His courtesy name is unknown.

He attained a jinshi degree in the imperial examination in 724, but left the capital to live a pastoral life, and composed his most famous poems on nature.

Among his better-known poems are the jueju "On Seeing the Snow Peak of Zhongnan" and the wuyan lüshi "Rufen bie ye". Book 131 of the Quan Tangshi is devoted to his poetry.

== Biography ==
Zu Yong was probably born around 699, but this is not certain. (Note: Ueki, Uno & Matsubara (1999) state that his year of birth is not known.) He hailed from Luoyang in modern-day Henan Province. He was a childhood friend of the poet Wang Wei.

In 724 he attained a jinshi degree in the imperial examination. He earned the favour of the high-ranking statesman Zhang Yue, but he did not take to life at court, and in his later years retired to his villa in Rufen (simplified Chinese: 汝坟; traditional Chinese: 汝墳; pinyin: Rǔfén, modern-day Fuyang, Anhui Province).

His courtesy name is not known.

== Poetry ==
Zu Yong occupies a prominent position as a nature poet of the High Tang period. In addition to writing about natural scenery, his poems sing the praises of life in seclusion. Thirty-six of his poems survive, and two of his poems were included in the Three Hundred Tang Poems.

He was a close friend of the poet Wang Wei and also an associate of Wang Han.

One of his most famous poems is the wuyan lüshi "Rufen bie ye" (simplified Chinese: 汝坟别业; traditional Chinese: 汝墳別業; pinyin: Rǔfén bié yè), which is considered the representative poem of his post-retirement period.

Traditional	Simplified	Pinyin
春城無處不飛花， 寒食東風禦柳斜。	春城无处不飞花， 寒食东风御柳斜。	shī lù nóng wéi yè, yí jiā dào rǔ fén. dú chóu cháng fèi juàn, duō bìng jiǔ lí qún.

The first half of the poem bemoans the solitude and loneliness of the poet's life of farming after leaving court, and then the latter half is filled with love for the new environment in which the poet finds himself.

Another of his best-regarded works is the jueju "On Seeing the Snow Peak of Zhongnan" (simplified Chinese: 终南望馀; traditional Chinese: 終南望餘雪; pinyin: Zhōngnán wàng yú xuě).

There exists a Ming-era compilation called the Zu Yong Ji (simplified Chinese: 祖咏集; traditional Chinese: 祖詠集; pinyin: Zǔ Yǒng-jí; Wade–Giles: Tsu^{3} Yung^{3} Chi^{1}; lit. 'Zu Yong Anthology').

== Cited works ==
- "Zu Yong (So Ei in Japanese)". Britannica Kokusai Dai-Hyakkajiten (in Japanese). Encyclopædia Britannica, Inc. 2014. Archived from the original on 2016-11-06.
- Inoda, Misako (2009). 王翰詩研究 [Research on Wang Han's Poems] (thesis abstract). Sapporo Mandarin Studies (in Chinese). Vol. 14. Sapporo: Hokkaido University of Education.
- Ueki, Hisayuki; Uno, Naoto; Matsubara, Akira (1999). "Shijin to Shi no Shōgai (So Ei)". In Matsuura, Tomohisa (ed.). Kanshi no Jiten 漢詩の事典 (in Japanese). Vol. 1. Tokyo: Taishūkan Shoten. pp. 81–82. OCLC 41025662.
