= Wangchuan ji =

Collection of Wang Wei and Pei Di poems

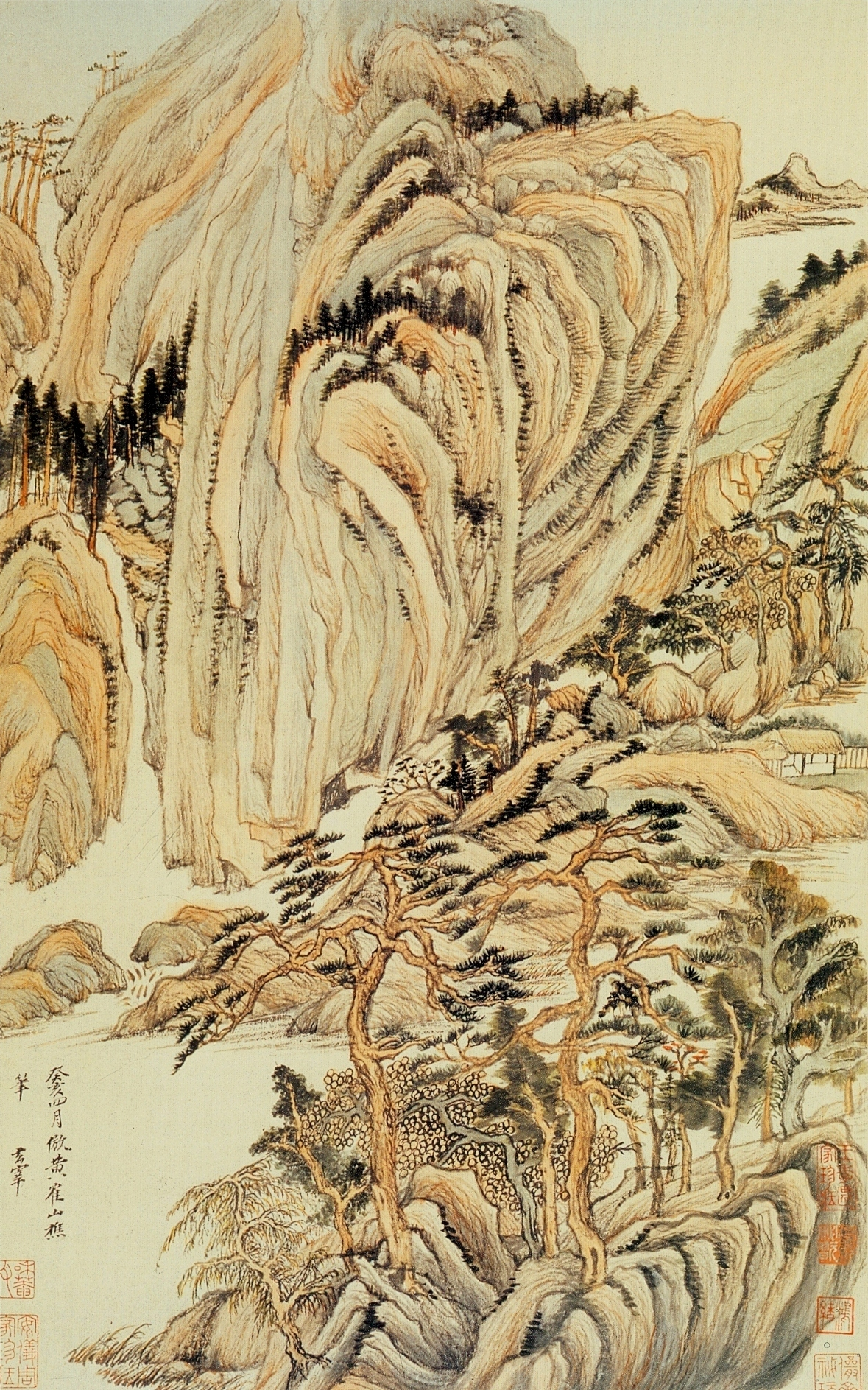
Landscapes in the Manner of Old Masters (in the manner of Wang Wei). Album leaf. Dong Qichang. 1621-24.

The Wangchuan ji (simplified Chinese: 辋川集; traditional Chinese: 輞川集; pinyin: Wǎngchuān jí; Wade–Giles: Wang-ch'uan chi) is an 8th-century collection of Tang poetry written by the two poets Wang Wei and Pei Di, also known by other names, such as the Wheel River Collection or Wang River Collection Note that the "Wang" in Wang Wei and the "Wang" in Wang River are different words from each other and written with different characters. Wang Wei had acquired a retirement location away from the busy capital city, in what is now Lantian County, in China. The verses are based on a series of twenty scenes, inspired in part by the sights available at Wang Wei's retirement estate and in part by imaginary allusion: each one forms the topic for a pair of one five-character quatrains, one by each of the poetic pair. Besides the long-term interest in these verses in China, this anthology has created much interest around the world, including numerous translations, especially Wang's version of what has been translated as "Deer Park", among other versions of the title. Several complete translations of the whole work have been done, in English, although the concentration has been on Wang's contributions. A series of "Twenty Scenes" of Wangchuan were done as a set series of paintings. The Wangchuan poems (and related artworks) form an important part of traditional Chinese Shan shui landscape painting and Shanshui poetry development. There are clear indications of the influence of the Six Dynasties poet early exemplar of landscape genre poetry Xie Lingyun's poems on topics, partly inspired by his family estate, in what is today Zhejiang. The considerable influence of Pei Di and Wang Wei's Wangchuan ji shows in much subsequent painting, music, and poetry.

== Setting ==
Some of Wang Wei's most famous poetry was composed as a series of quatrains that he wrote, to which his friend Pei Di replied with double couplets. Together, these form a group titled the Wang River Collection. Note that "Wang" as in the river is a different character that the "Wang" (王) of Wang Wei's name. Wang (輞)literally refers to rim or outside part of a wheel (or perhaps just a proper noun) chuan means "river", and ji means a collection. Sometimes, also, these are sometimes referred to as the "Lantian poems", after the real name of Wang's estate's location, in Lantian County.

Wang Wei's career as a government official had its ups and downs. One of his early positions was serving in Liangzhou, which then was a term used to refer to the larger area of Wuwei. After completing his service there and returning to the capital city of Chang'an, Wang Wei took the opportunity of his temporary lack of official posting to explore the countryside to the south of the capital, in the Lantian area of the Zhongnan Mountains. As well, Wang Wei then made friends with Pei Di. In 740-741 Wang resumed his successful governmental career, including an inspection tour of Xiangyang, Hubei, and then he held various positions in Chang'an. Besides the official salary connected with this government work, he had received financial rewards as an artist; thus, he was able to acquire a sizable estate in Lantian, formerly owned by the poet Song Zhiwen (approximately 660–712), an estate known as Wang Chuan. Upon his Lantian estate Wang Wei established a shrine for sake of his Buddhist mother, and after his mother died, in 747-748, he spent the traditional three-year mourning period for the death of a parent, in this location, and during which time he was reportedly so afflicted by grief as to having been reduced almost to a skeleton.

Inspired, in part, by Wang's Lantian home and features found in its neighborhood and their correspondences with other places and features, the collection includes such pieces as the poem often translated "Deer Park" (sometimes considered to literally mean "Deer Fence"). However, the poems tend to have a deceptive simplicity to them, while they actually have great depth and complexity upon closer examination. Part of the complexity derives from the ironic juxtaposition of imagination and exaggeration with the realities of a retired official's situation at the time. In these poems, there is a theme of metaphorical comparison between features of Wang's estate and places well known to the poets and their audience to have famously existed elsewhere in the world as known to them. Wang Wei may have had a fence to keep deer out of his vegetable garden, but even as a high level government official it would not have been the case that Wang would have possessed an actual deer park (as known in England and Eurasia at the time), or more to the point, like the Sarnath deer park—associated with he enlightenment of the Buddha. such would have only been a royal prerogative; however, in the poets' imagination the two become one. The real life location of Wang Wei's retirement home was in the foothills of the Qinling Mountains, south of the Tang capital city of Chang'an, in what is now Lantian County, of Xi'an Sub-provincial city, of Shaanxi. The poems tend to literally describe the posh and palatial features of a fantastic and enormous estate, including a spring which brought forth gold dust; however these specific details should be viewed within the context of poetic flights of fancy (and a dry humour): as art critic and Chinese scholar John Ferguson put it, in regards to the Wheel River property as describe by the two poets:

...such a place as is depicted existed only in the realm of fancy. Wang Wei's imagination, helped by the genius of his two intimate friends, P'ei Ti and Mêng Hao-jan, clothed a barren hillside with beautiful rare trees, with spacious courtyards, and with a broad stream upon which boats plied and on whose banks stood a pretty fishing pavilion, with a deer park, with storks and birds––all of the delights of the eye and ear were brought together in this one lovely spot by the fancy of a brilliant genius.

— John C. Ferguson, describing limited literal reality of the Wang (Wheel) River Collection

Jerome Ch'en and Michael Bullock describe Wang Wei's studio:

In this lonely studio of his there were little else but his tea service, drug crucibles, sutra desk, incense burner, pouffe and hammock. He had one or two boys to attend to the household duties.

— Jerome Ch'en and Michael Bullock describing Wang Wei's studio

Wang Wei’s nature poetry simply describes his experience of the world with little if any interpretation or metaphorical explanation. Owen describes Wang Wei’s state of mind as “unselfconsciousness” and relates it to the Buddhist idea of Śūnyatā (emptiness). Only if the mind is emptied can one become aware of truth. This emptiness is typified in the opening line of the poem Deer Park: "Empty mountain: no one is seen."

=== Gallery ===
The Wangchuan landscape described in the Tang dynasty poems had a correspondence in painted imagery. Guo Zhongshu was one such painter, who flourished not long after the fall of the Tang.

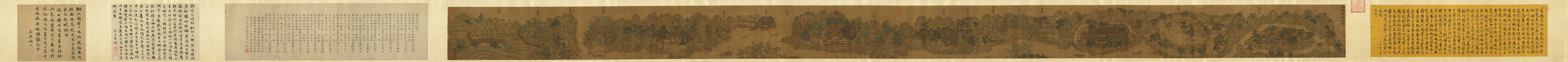
A pictorial interpretation of Wangchuan Villa by Guo Zhongshu (c. 929 – 977) with labels for topical features. Note: to be viewed right to left.

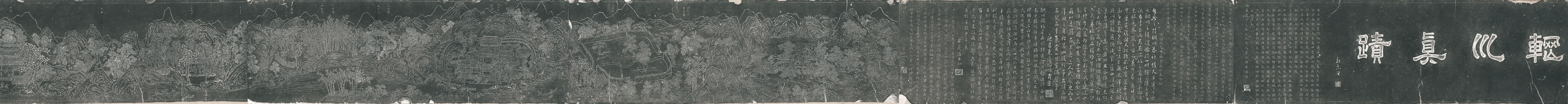
Another pictorial interpretation by Guo Zhongshu, said to be after a painting by Wang Wei. Note: to be viewed right to left.

== Modern influence ==
The Wheel River poems record the poets' journey, that of Wang Wei and his close friend Pei Di. They are far more universal than a few simple day trips to admire the scenery and have inspired generations of poets since, including recent adaptations such as Pain Not Bread's and Eliot Weinberger and Octavio Paz's 19 Ways of Looking at Wang Wei is an essay concerning more than 19 translations of Wang Wei's "Deer Park". Furthermore, the imaginary series of views inspired subsequent series of "Twenty Views of Wang Chuan" paintings or panoramas including the twenty views (actually the painting tradition for some reason contains or tends to contain a variant set of the twenty scenes of the poems).

== See also ==
- Chinese poetry
- Classical Chinese poetry
- Dhamek Stupa
- Jiehua#“Wangchuan Villa” 《辋川图》and “Snowy Stream” 《雪溪图》by Wang Wei 王维
- Meng Haoran
- Sarnath
- Tang poetry
- Wang Wei (Tang dynasty)
- Xie Lingyun
