= Fields and Gardens poetry =

Classical Chinese poetry genre

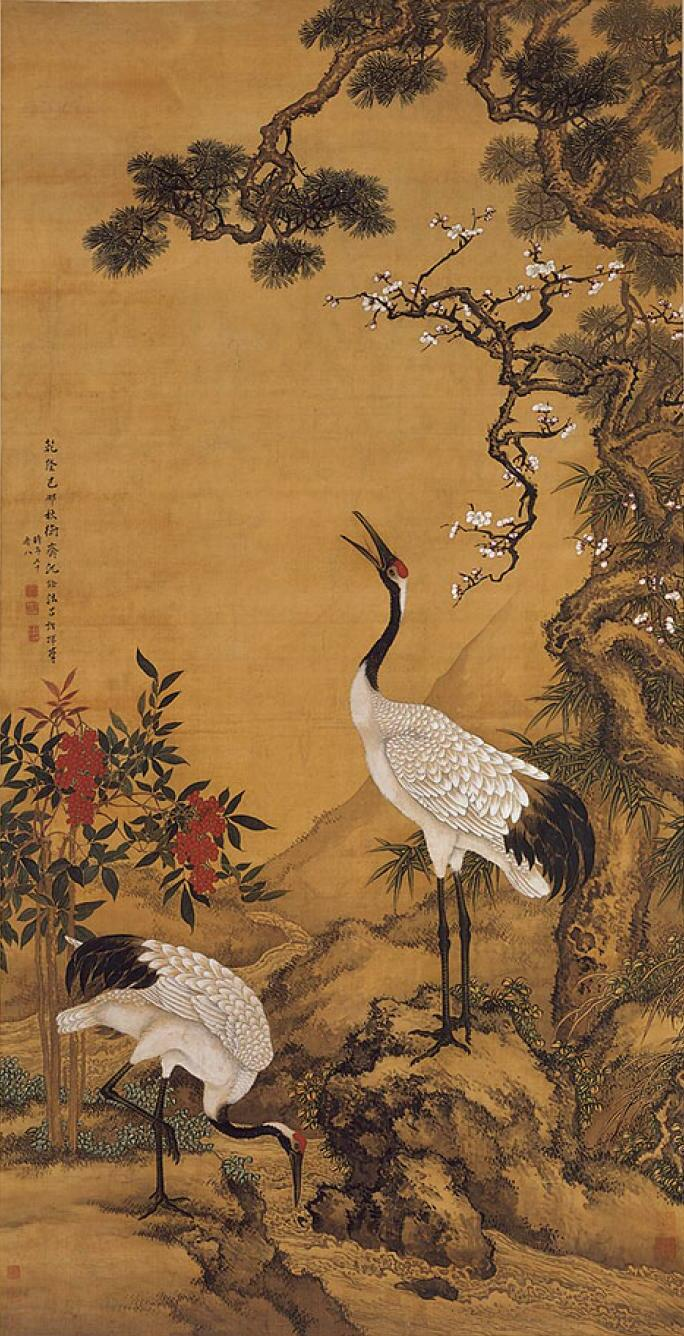
Pine, Plum and Cranes, 1759, by Shen Quan (1682—1760). Hanging scroll, ink and colour on silk. The Palace Museum, Beijing.

Fields and Gardens poetry (simplified Chinese: 田园诗; traditional Chinese: 田園詩; pinyin: tiányuán shī; Wade–Giles: t'ien-yuan-shih; lit. 'fields and gardens poetry'), in Chinese poetry, is a poetic movement which sparked centuries of poetic enthusiasm, generally considered to effectively date from the Six Dynasties era. Both the Chinese Landscape poetry and the Fields and Gardens poetry share a common theme of nature foremost with human beings and human thought seemingly not in main focus; however, in the case of the Fields and Gardens genre the nature that was focused upon was more domestic—the nature found in gardens, in backyards, and in the cultivated countryside. Sometimes, the poems were designed to be viewed with a particular work of art, others were intended to be "textual art" that invoked an image inside a reader's mind. Fields and Gardens poetry is one of many Classical Chinese poetry genres.

One of the main practitioners of the Fields and Gardens poetry genre was Tao Yuanming (also known as Tao Qian (365–427), among other names or versions of names). Tao Yuanming has been regarded as the first great poet associated with the Fields and Gardens poetry genre.

Translator and commentator David Hinton sees the Fields and Gardens genre as more of a subgenre of the Shanshui (mountains-and-waters) genre, than as a standalone, side-by-side genre under the general heading of Chinese landscape poetry.

== See also ==
- Chang Jian
- Chinese garden
- Chinese poetry
- Classical Chinese poetry
- Meng Haoran
- Pei Di
- Qiu Wei
- Return to the Field
- Shanshui poetry
- Wang Wei (Tang dynasty)
