= Cen Shen =

Chinese poet

- 岑參
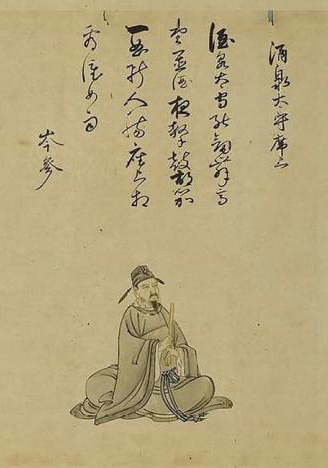
- Cen Shen, painted by Kanō Tsunenobu in the 18th century.
- Born: 715; Jiangling, Hubei, China
- Died: 770 (aged 54–55); Chengdu, Sichuan, China
- Occupation: Poet

Chinese name
- Traditional Chinese: 岑參
- Simplified Chinese: 岑参
Transcriptions
Standard Mandarin
- Hanyu Pinyin: Cén Shēn or Cén Cān
- Wade–Giles: Ts'en Shen, Ts'en Ts'an

Cen Jiazhou
- Chinese: 岑嘉州
Transcriptions
Standard Mandarin
- Hanyu Pinyin: Cén Jiāzhōu

Cen Shen or Cen Can (simplified Chinese: 岑参; traditional Chinese: 岑參; pinyin: Cén Shēn), 715–770, was a Chinese poet. He was regarded one of the great Chinese poets during the Tang dynasty. His poems were included in the Three Hundred Poems anthology.

== Name ==
He is also called Cen Jiazhou (岑嘉州; Cén Jiāzhōu; Ts'en Chia-chou).

During the reign of Emperor Suzong he was made governor (長官) of Jia Prefecture (Jiazhou in Chinese), which earned him the name Cen Jiazhou.

== Life ==
He was born to a bureaucratic family in Nanyang (in today's Henan), but later moved to Jiangling, Jizhou (in today's Hubei). His great-grandfather Cen Wenben, granduncle Cen Changqian and uncle Cen Xi were all chancellors. His father Cen Zhi was Governor (Cishi) of Jingzhou. When Cen Shen was 10, his father died, and the financial situation of his family worsened. After then, Cen learned with assiduity, reading a lot of scriptures and history books. He moved to Chang'an when he was 20 and obtained jinshi in 744.

In 749, Cen's ambitions led him towards a stint of military service which would last about ten years, where he served as a subordinate to General Gao Xianzhi, and, later, Feng Changqing. In about 751, Cen met Gao Shi and Du Fu, and the three had become good friends. All three were poets. Cen's other friend was the great Tang poet Li Bai, who composed a poem titled "Bring in the Wine", and included a verse which mentioned his friend Cen Shen: "To the old master, Cen [...] Bring in the wine! Let your cups never rest! Let me sing you a song! Let your ears attend!"

Cen Shen lived through the period from 755 through 763 when the An-Shi disturbances shook the land, spreading civil war, disaster, and all sorts of turmoil throughout the northern parts of China.

During this period he held several assignments in the Central Asian outposts of the far-reaching Tang empire. Having supported the loyalist cause, he succeeded to a number of provincial posts (primarily in Sichuan) under the restoration until his retirement in 768.

Cen's early poems were always landscape poems, although this is not the case of his later ones.

Cen served in the northwest frontier territories area for about ten years, his experience in this area with its harsh climate and the relentless combat of the times made a deep impact on his poetry.

One of Cen's poems includes the earliest known reference to Actinidia chinensis (kiwifruit), involving a plant growing above a well in Shaanxi.

== Poems ==
Seven of Cen Can's poems were included in the famous anthology Three Hundred Tang Poems, including:

- Ascending the Pagoda at the Temple of Kind Favour with Gao Shi and Xue Ju
- A Song of Running-horse River in Farewell to General Feng of the Western Expedition
- A Song of Wheel Tower in Farewell to General Feng of the Western Expedition
- A Song of White Snow in Farewell to Field-clerk Wu Going Home
- A Message to Censor Du Fu at His Office in the Left Court
- An Early Audience at the Palace of Light Harmonizing Secretary Jia Zhi's Poem
- On Meeting a Messenger to the Capital

His collected works are in scrolls (sections) 198 through 201 of the Collected Tang Poems.

== See also ==
- Tang poetry
- Three Hundred Tang Poems
- Volume 67 of the Book of the Later Han, for information on Cen Can's ancestor Cen Zhi, and his life during the Disasters of Partisan Prohibitions (in Chinese)

== Bibliography ==
- Davis, A. R. (Albert Richard), Editor and Introduction (1970), The Penguin Book of Chinese Verse. (Baltimore: Penguin Books).
- Liu, Wu-chi and Irving Lo, eds., (1975). Sunflower Splendor: Three Thousand Years of Chinese Poetry. Bloomington: Indiana University.
- Wu, John C. H. (1972). The Four Seasons of Tang Poetry. Rutland, Vermont: Charles E.Tuttle. ISBN 978-0-8048-0197-3
