= Chen Tao (poet) =

Chinese poet

Chen Tao (traditional Chinese: 陳陶; ; pinyin: Chén Táo; Wade–Giles: Ch'en T'ao, 824-882) was a poet of the late Tang dynasty. He wrote four poems about war in Longxi, one of which was included in the anthology Three Hundred Tang Poems. Some of his other poems were anthologized in Quantangshi (also known as the Collected Tang Poems). The poem appearing in the Three Hundred Tang Poems is the well-known verse sometimes known as "Lung-hsi Song".

== Biography ==
Biographical information about Chen Tao seems scarce; not only that, but, A. R. Davis mentions an "element of confusion", in this regard: and, if this is the same Chen Tao mentioned in connection with Tian Lingzi in the year 888, then either this date or the date of his death is wrong. It is known that Chen Tao was learned in Buddhism and Taoism and that he pursued the study of astronomy and alchemy, and that he spent most of his life in retirement in what is now Nanchang, in the Chinese province of Jiangxi.

== Poetry ==
Chen Tao is best known for his one poem which is included in the Three Hundred Tang Poems ("隴西行", Longxi xing), translated as "Turkestan" by Witter Bynner.
