= Wei Yingwu =

Wei Yingwu (traditional Chinese: 韋應物; simplified Chinese: 韦应物; pinyin: Wéi Yìngwù; Wade–Giles: Wei Ying-wu; c. 737? – c. 792), courtesy name Yibo (義博), art name Xizhai (西齋), was a Chinese poet of the Tang dynasty. Twelve of Wei Yingwu's poems were included in the influential Three Hundred Tang Poems anthology. He was also known by his honorific name Wei Suzhou (韋蘇州), which was bestowed upon him as a result of his service as the governor of Suzhou.

== Biography ==
Wei Yingwu was born around 737 in Chang'an. He came from a prestigious family, the Xiaoyaogong branch of the Wei clan of Jingzhao, and was born into nobility; his great-grandfather, Wei Daijia, had been a chancellor during the reign of Wu Zetian. Wei Yingwu became an imperial bodyguard of Emperor Xuanzong when he was fifteen years old. Because he came from a noble background, he was not required to pass the imperial examination.

After the death of Emperor Xuanzong, Wei Yingwu served as the magistrate of Hu County and Yueyang. He was also the governor of Chuzhou (784), Jiangzhou (785), and Suzhou (787-792). He died in Suzhou in 792.

According to John C. H. Wu, the turbulence and lack of strong central leadership of China during Wei Yingwu's poetry-writing years was a major influence upon his work. One example of such sociopolitical turmoil is the An Shi Rebellion of 755–763. Wu suggests that images such as the boat moving without a person steering in Wei Yingwu's poem "At Chuzhou on the Western Stream" are a reference to the ship of state without a person at the helm.

== Poetry ==
Wei Yingwu was strongly influenced by the 5th-century poet Tao Yuanming, whose poems reflect his indifference to the world. Editors of Siku Quanshu commented that his poems are "Simple but not vulgar, rich but not pedantic". Wei Yingwu's most praised poetry consists of the five-character poems (五言) prominent during the Tang era. The majority of Wei Yingwu's poems depict various nature scenes, such as mountains and rivers, consistent with the mountains-and-rivers style of landscape poetry (山水). According to Bai Juyi, Wei Yingwu's poems were inspired by the feelings stirred by natural scenery; Bai Juyi greatly praised Wei Yingwu's work, describing it as "elegant and idle". Later generations of literary critics often associated Wei Yingwu with Liu Zongyuan.

In his work Qizhui Ji (七綴集), Qian Zhongshu draws a parallel between Wang Wei and Wei Yingwu. Qian Zhongshu further cited the theories of Italian literary critic Benedetto Croce, who had referred to Wei Yingwu as "un grande-piccolo poeta" or "大的小詩人" ("a minor poet among great poets"), in contrast to Wang Wei, whom he described as "un piccolo-grande poeta" or "小的大詩人" ("a great poet among minor poets").

Wei Yingwu's poems collected in the anthology Three Hundred Tang Poems were translated by Witter Bynner as:

- "Entertaining Literary Men in my Official Residence on a Rainy Day"
- "Setting Sail on the Yangzi to Secretary Yuan"
- "A Poem to a Taoist Hermit Chuanjiao Mountain"
- "On Meeting my Friend Feng Zhu in the Capital"
- "Mooring at Twilight in Yuyi District"
- "East of the Town"
- "To my Daughter on Her Marriage Into the Yang Family"
- "A Greeting on the Huai River to my Old Friends from Liangchuan"
- "A Farewell in the Evening Rain to Li Cao"
- "To my Friends Li Dan and Yuanxi"
- "An Autumn Night Message to Qiu"
- "At Chuzhou on the Western Stream"

== Translations ==
Apart from selected poems found in various anthologies, Wei Yingwu's poetry has not been as popular in translation as many of his Tang-era contemporaries. The poet and translator Red Pine (Bill Porter) published a bilingual translation of all of Wei Yingwu's poetry, In Such Hard Times: The Poetry of Wei Ying-wu (Copper Canyon Press, 2009), which earned the Best Translated Book Award from the University of Rochester's translation press, and the American Literary Translators Association (ALTA)'s inaugural Lucien Stryk Asian Translation Prize (2010).

== Works cited ==
- Ueki, Hisayuki; Uno, Naoto; Matsubara, Akira (1999). "Shijin to Shi no Shōgai (I Ōbutsu)". In Matsuura, Tomohisa (ed.). Kanshi no Jiten 漢詩の事典 (in Japanese). Vol. 1. Tokyo: Taishūkan Shoten. pp. 106–107. OCLC 41025662.
- Wu, John C. H. (1972). The Four Seasons of Tang Poetry. Rutland, Vermont: Charles E. Tuttle. ISBN 978-0-8048-0197-3
