= Liu Zhongyong =

Liu Zhongyong (Chinese: 柳中庸; pinyin: Liǔ Zhōngyōng, was a Chinese poet of the Tang dynasty. One of his poems is included in the famous Three Hundred Tang Poems anthology.

== Poetry ==
Out of thirteen surviving poems in the Collected Tang Poems, Liu Zhongyong had one poem collected in Three Hundred Tang Poems, which was translated by Witter Bynner as "A Trooper's Burden".
