= Lu Lun =

Lu Lun (traditional Chinese: 盧綸; simplified Chinese: 卢纶; pinyin: Lú Lún, 739–799) was a Chinese poet of the Middle Tang dynasty, with six of his poems being included in the famous anthology Three Hundred Tang Poems, as well as being mentioned in one poem, by Sikong Shu, which was translated by Witter Bynner as "When Lu Lun My Cousin Comes For The Night". His courtesy name is Yun Yan (Chinese: 允言; pinyin: Yǔn Yán).

== Biography ==
Lu Lun was born around 748. His ancestral home was Fanyang, now in modern southwest Beijing, China. He was born in what is now Yongji, Shanxi.

He was prevented from assuming his governmental appointment, following his receiving the Jinshi degree in the Imperial examination system, by the disorders associated with the An Shi Rebellion, which caused him to flee for refuge to Jiangxi.

He died around 799.

== Poetry ==
As a poet, Lu Lun is known for continuing the Frontier fortress genre of Tang poetry (along with Li Yi), begun earlier by the "Borders and Frontier Fortress Poets Group" (边塞诗派), in which are included Gao Shi, Cen Can, Wang Changling, Wang Zhihuan, Cui Hao, and Li Qi. Indeed, out of the six lyrics of Lu's included in the Tang 300, four of them are variations written under the title of "Beyond the Border Tunes" (塞下曲).

== See also ==
- Tang poetry
- Classical Chinese poetry
- Classical Chinese poetry genres

== Cited works ==
- Ueki, Hisayuki; Uno, Naoto; Matsubara, Akira (1999). "Shijin to Shi no Shōgai (Ro Rin)". In Matsuura, Tomohisa (ed.). Kanshi no Jiten 漢詩の事典 (in Japanese). Tokyo: Taishūkan Shoten. pp. 108–109. OCLC 41025662.
