= Sun Zhu =

- Traditional Chinese: 孫洙
- Simplified Chinese: 孙洙
Transcriptions
Standard Mandarin
- Hanyu Pinyin: Sūn Zhū

Second alternative Chinese name
- Chinese: 蘅塘退士
- Literal meaning: Retired Master of Hengtang
Transcriptions
Standard Mandarin
- Hanyu Pinyin: Héngtáng Tuìshì

Sun Zhu (1711–1778) was a Chinese poet and poetry anthologist of the Qing dynasty. He was also known as Hengtang Tuishi ("Retired Master of Hengtang") and was the original compiler and editor of the anthology Three Hundred Tang Poems, a popular compilation of Tang poetry, partly designed as a study aid for students. An enduring classic, Sun Zhu's version has often been reprinted, often in revised or re-edited editions.

== Biography ==
Dissatisfied with the anthology Poems by a Thousand Masters (Qianjiashi 千家詩) compiled by Liu Kezhuang in the late Southern Song dynasty and influenced by Ming dynasty poetry anthologies, Sun selected the poems for a new anthology, based upon their popularity and educational value. His collection has been popular ever since, and can be found in many Chinese households. For centuries, elementary students memorized the poems and used them to learn to read and write. The collection includes selections of most major forms of Tang poetry of the shi form, which is considered to be the main poetic type. Major poets whose works appear in Sun Zhu's anthology include Du Fu, Li Bai, Wang Wei, Li Shangyin, Meng Haoran, and Bai Juyi.

== See also ==
- List of Three Hundred Tang Poems poets
- Quantangshi
- Classical Chinese poetry
