= Cui Tu =

Tang Chinese poet

Cui Tu (traditional Chinese: 崔塗; simplified Chinese: 崔涂; pinyin: Cuī Tú; Wade–Giles: Ts'ui T'u, born 854) was a poet of the late Tang dynasty, and two of whose poems were collected in the popular anthology Three Hundred Tang Poems.

== Biography ==
Cui Tu lived toward the end of the Tang dynasty.

== Poetry ==
Cui Tu is best known for his two poems which are included in the Three Hundred Tang Poems, translated by Witter Bynner as "On New Year's Eve" and "A Solitary Wildgoose" .
