= Li Pin =

Li Pin (traditional Chinese: 李頻; simplified Chinese: 李频; pinyin: Lǐ Pín; Wade–Giles: Li P'in, 818–876) was a late Tang dynasty poet. One of Li Pin's poems was collected in the popular anthology Three Hundred Tang Poems.

== Poetry ==
Li Pin's poem "Crossing the Han River" is described by Kenneth Rexroth as "one of the most perfect poems of the later T'ang".

渡漢江 Crossing the Han River

嶺外音書絕， Away from home, I was longing for news
經冬復立春。 Winter after winter, spring after spring.
近鄉情更怯， Now, nearing my village, meeting people,
不敢問來人。 I dare not ask a single question.

Translation by Witter Bynner.
