= Sikong Shu =

Chinese poet and politician

Sikong Shu or Ssü-k'ung Shu (Chinese: 司空曙; pinyin: Sīkōng Shǔ; Wade–Giles: Ssü-k'ung Shu; c. 720 – c. 790) was a Chinese poet of the Tang dynasty. Three of his poems were included in the popular anthology Three Hundred Tang Poems. Sikong was known as one of the "Ten Poets of Talent of the Dali period" (766–779), which was Emperor Daizong of Tang's third and final regnal period.

== Biography ==
The year of Sikong Shu's birth is not known. He was a native of what is now Guangping County, of Hebei Province, China. He was moderately successful in his career as a governmental official.

== Name ==
"Sikong" is a Chinese compound surname.

== Poetry ==
Sikong Shu's poems as collected in Three Hundred Tang Poems were translated by Witter Bynner as:

- "A Farewell to Han Shen at the Yunyang Inn"
- "When Lu Lun my Cousin Comes for the Night"
- "To a Friend Bound North After the Rebellion"

== See also ==
- Lu Lun

== Works cited ==
- Davis, A. R. (Albert Richard), Editor and Introduction (1970), The Penguin Book of Chinese Verse. (Baltimore: Penguin Books).
- Ueki, Hisayuki; Uno, Naoto; Matsubara, Akira (1999). "Shijin to Shi no Shōgai (Shikū Sho)". In Matsuura, Tomohisa (ed.). Kanshi no Jiten 漢詩の事典 (in Japanese). Tokyo: Taishūkan Shoten. p. 106. OCLC 41025662.
