= Zheng Gu =

Chinese poet

Zheng Gu(Chinese: 鄭谷), courtesy name Shouyu(守愚) was a Chinese poet who lived in the late Tang dynasty. Zheng was born in Yuanzhou. He held several different civil positions during the reign of Emperor Xizong of Tang and Emperor Zhaozong of Tang but he is best known for his literary works. Zheng was one of the ten sages of Fanglin(芳林十哲). Along with the other nine sages, he was one of the popular poets in the late Tang dynasty. For most of his contemporaries, he was known as Zheng Duguan(鄭都官). Duguan is the civil position Zheng held in the imperial court.

Zheng's poems are "clear and delicate" according to Zu Wuze. Ouyang Xiu commented on Zheng's literary style and argued that Zheng's poems are "Very interesting but lack magnificence" Chao Gongwu, a literary commentator, criticized the excessive use of common language in Zheng's poems but acknowledged his deep philosophical thinking in the poems that Zheng wrote. It is also noticeable that many of Zheng's poems reflect a melancholic tone

During Zheng's lifetime, the Tang dynasty crumbled. He returned to his hometown between the year of 901-904 and made friends with the Buddhist monk Qiji who was also a poet. Without concerning himself with political affairs his later days were spent in his personal cottage.
