= Dai Shulun =

Chinese poet

Dai Shulun (simplified Chinese: 戴叔伦; traditional Chinese: 戴叔倫; pinyin: Dài Shūlún; Wade–Giles: Tai Shu-lun, 732-789) was a Chinese poet of the mid-Tang period.

== Biography ==
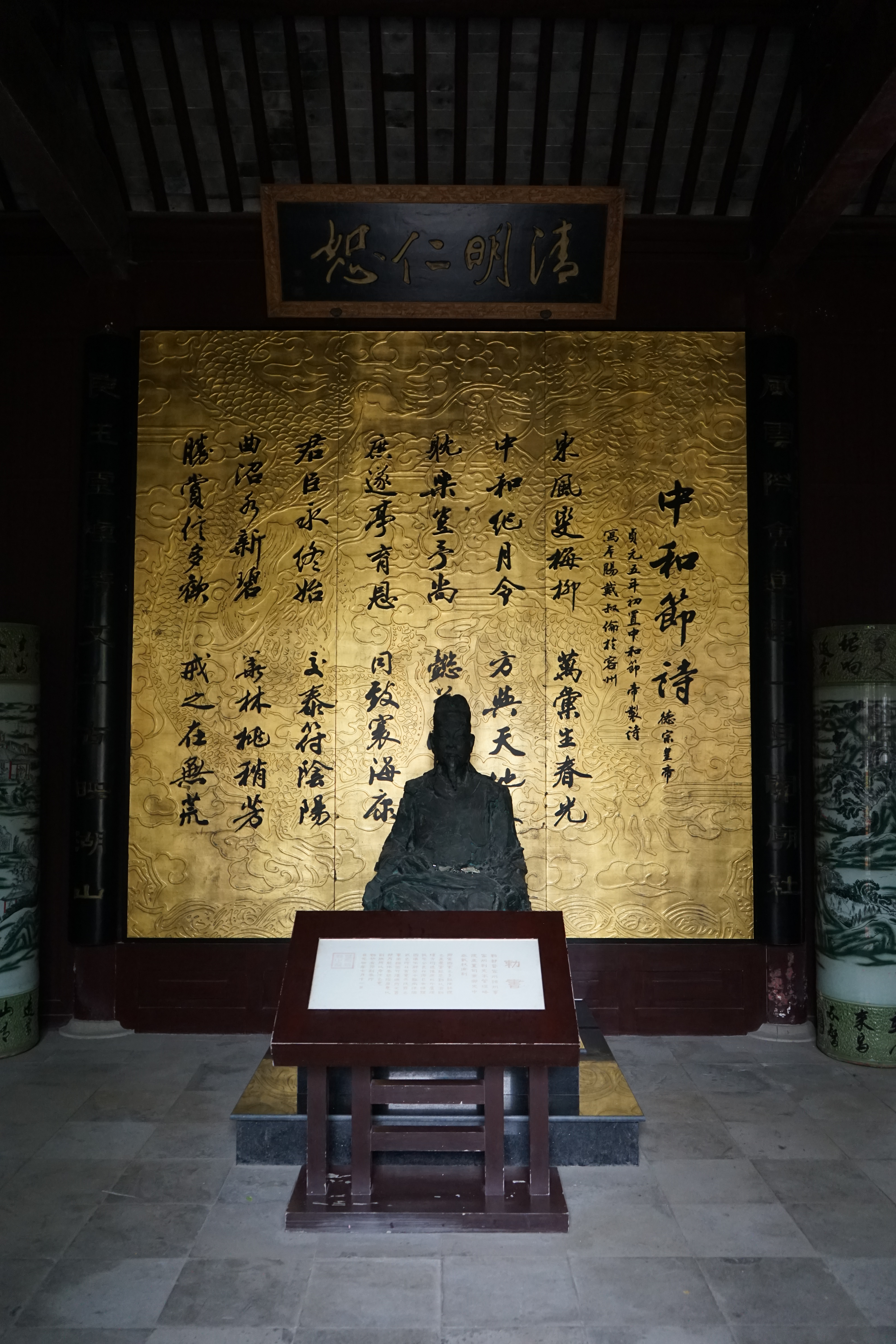
Memorial to Dai Shulun in Jintan with a poem from Emperor Dezong

Dai Shulun, born in 732, was a native of Jintan, Runzhou (in today's Jiangsu). He served as a government official, however, in his later years, he was banished from the imperial court after the death of Emperor Daizong in 779. He then held various provincial positions, including a stint as the governor of Fuzhou, Jiangxi and as the frontier commissioner (经略使, jinglue shi) of Rongzhou (容州) in Guangxi. He was recalled ten years later back to the court, but died before he reached the capital in 789.

== Works ==
Dai had ten collections of poetry published, but only two have survived to the present day. One of his poems was included in the important Qing-era anthology Three Hundred Tang Poems.
