= Zhang Hu (poet) =

Chinese poet of the mid-Tang dynasty

- Traditional Chinese: 張祜
- Simplified Chinese: 张祜
- Literal meaning: (given name)
Transcriptions
Standard Mandarin
- Hanyu Pinyin: Zhāng Hù
- Wade–Giles: Chang^{2} Hu^{4}

Alternative Chinese name
- Chinese: 承吉
- Literal meaning: (courtesy name)
Transcriptions
Standard Mandarin
- Hanyu Pinyin: Chéngjí
- Wade–Giles: Ch'eng^{1}chi^{1}

Zhang Hu (c. 792 – c. 853) was a Chinese poet of the mid-Tang dynasty. His courtesy name was Chengji.

After travelling to the capital of Chang'an, Zhang was unsuccessful in seeking a position at court. He spent the latter half of his life travelling to famous places and composing poetry. The majority of his surviving poems are on historical topics and famous places he visited in his travels.

== Biography ==
Zhang Hu was born in 792, (Note: Ueki et al. 1999 put a question mark on this date.) in Qinghe (modern Qinghe County, Hebei or Shandong) or possibly Nanyang (modern Nanyang, Henan). His courtesy name was Chengji.

Zhang flourished between 820 and 845. Living early on in Gusu, in the Changqing era (821–824) he was summoned to the capital Chang'an on the recommendation of Linghu Chu. Linghu had known Zhang through the 810s, and his recommendation memorial was submitted along with 300 of Zhang's poems. However, he failed to find employment at court due to the opposition of Yuan Zhen, who claimed Zhang lacked literary talent. Zhang moved to Huainan, where he spent his days visiting famous temples and places of scenic beauty and devoting himself to poetry composition.

Later, Zhang retired to Danyang (modern Danyang, Jiangsu), where spent the rest of his days as a private citizen. He likely died in 852 or 853. (Note: Britannica gives the date as "852?" while Ueki et al. 1999 give "853?".)

== Poetry ==
Roughly 350 of Zhang's poems have survived, most of which are based on famous temples and places of scenic beauty that he visited in his travels. He primarily wrote quatrains on historical topics. There is an anthology of his poetry called the Zhang Chushi Shiji (simplified Chinese: 张処士诗集; traditional Chinese: 張處士詩集; pinyin: Zhāng Chǔshì Shījí; Wade–Giles: Chang^{2} Ch'u^{3}shih^{4} Shih^{2}chi^{1}; lit. 'Collection of Poems by Retired Scholar Zhang').

Zhang wrote a dozen poems on the reign of Xuanzong, of which the following notably deals with the emperor's relationship with an older sister of Yang Guifei:

Traditional	Simplified	Pinyin	English translation (by Lily Xiao Hong Lee)
虢國夫人承主恩， 平明騎馬入宮門。 卻嫌脂粉汙顏色， 淡掃蛾眉朝至尊。	虢国夫人承主恩， 平明骑马入宫门。 却嫌脂粉污颜色， 淡扫蛾眉朝至尊。	guó guó fū rén chéng zhǔ ēn, píng míng qí mǎ rù gōng mén. què xián zhī fěn wū yán sè, dàn sǎo é méi cháo zhì zūn.	The Lady of Guo State received the emperor's graciousness. In the early morning she rode her horse into the palace. Thinking rouge and powder soiled her beauty, She lightly brushed her eyebrows before facing the emperor.

Among Zhang's better-known poems is the wuyan lüshi "Jinshan-si" (Chinese: 金山寺; pinyin: Jīnshān-sì; Wade–Giles: Chin^{2}shan^{2}-ssu^{4}; lit. 'Jinshan Temple" or "Golden Mountain Temple'):

Traditional	Simplified	Pinyin
一宿金山寺，超然離世群。 僧歸夜船月，龍出曉堂雲。 樹色中流見，鐘聲兩岸聞。 翻思在朝市，終日醉醺醺。	一宿金山寺，超然离世群。 僧归夜船月，龙出晓堂云。 树色中流见，钟声两岸闻。 翻思在朝市，终日醉醺醺。	yī sù jīn shān sì, chāo rán lí shì qún. sēng guī yè chuán yuè, lóng chū xiǎo táng yún. shù sè zhōngliú jiàn, zhōng shēng liǎng àn wén. fān sī zài zhāo shì, zhōng rì zuì xūn xūn.

Five of Zhang's poems were included in the Three Hundred Tang Poems.

== Works cited ==
- "Zhang Hu (Chō Ko in Japanese)". Britannica Kokusai Dai-Hyakkajiten (in Japanese). Encyclopædia Britannica, Inc. 2014.
- Mair, Victor H. (ed.) (2001). The Columbia History of Chinese Literature. New York: Columbia University Press. ISBN 0-231-10984-9. (Amazon Kindle edition.)
- Moore, Oliver J. (2004). Rituals of Recruitment in Tang China: Reading an Annual Programme in the Collected Statements of Wang Dingbao (870–940). Leiden/Boston: Brill.
- Ueki, Hisayuki; Uno, Naoto; Matsubara, Akira (1999). "Shijin to Shi no Shōgai (Chō Ko)". In Matsuura, Tomohisa (ed.). Kanshi no Jiten 漢詩の事典 (in Japanese). Vol. 1. Tokyo: Taishūkan Shoten. p. 128. OCLC 41025662.
- Liu, Ning (2015). "Yang, Lady of Guo State". In Lee, Lily Xiao Hong; Wiles, Sue (eds.). Biographical Dictionary of Chinese Women: Tang Through Ming 618–1644. Vol. 1. Translated by Lee, Lily Xiao Hong. London/New York: Routledge. pp. 540–541. ISBN 9781317515623. OCLC 1069740337.
