= Zhang Zhihe =

Chinese philosopher, poet, politician, and spiritual writer

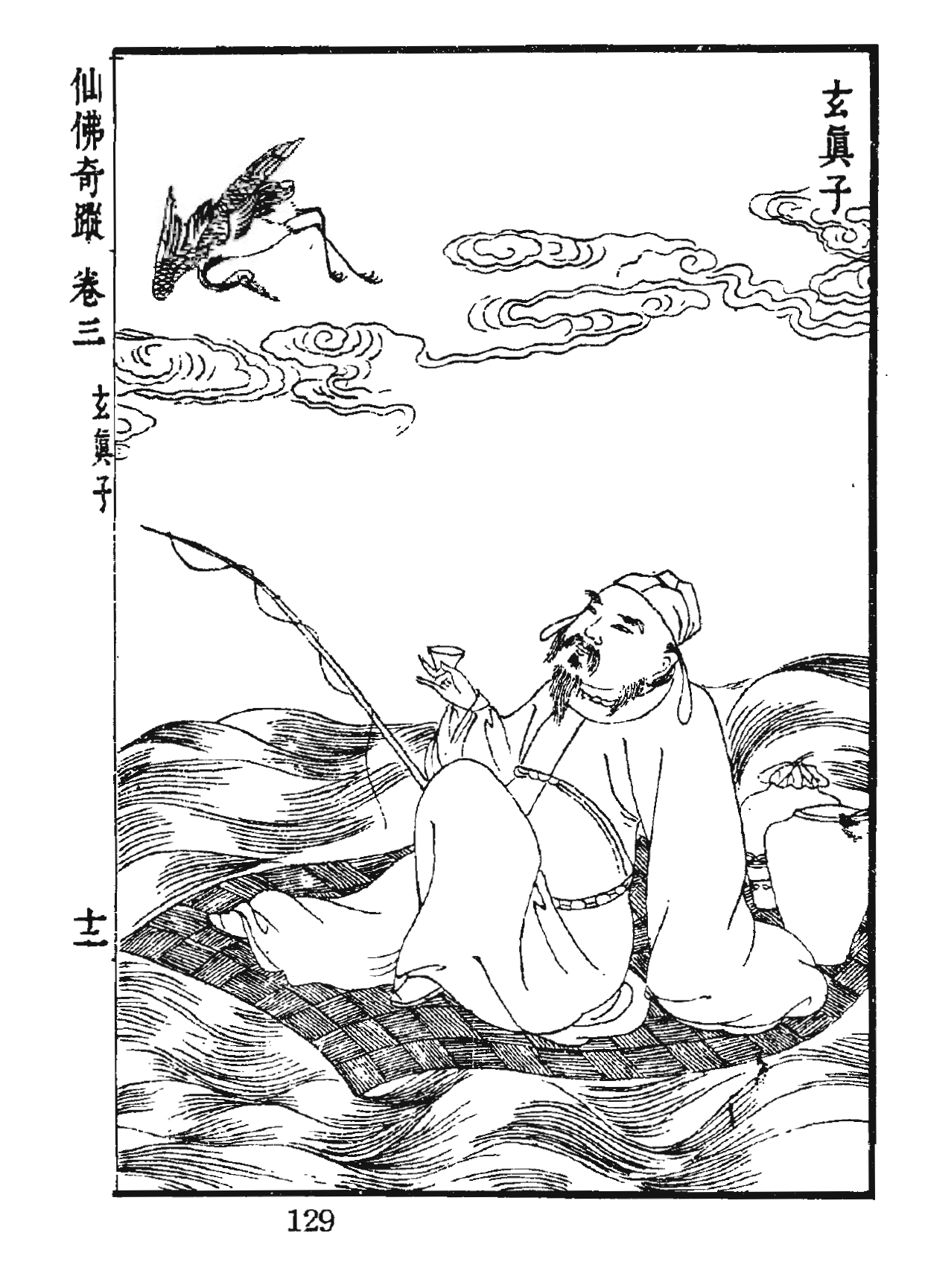
Illustrations of the Miraculous Journeys of Immortals and Buddhas

Zhang Zhihe (Chinese: 張志和; pinyin: Zhāng Zhìhé; Wade–Giles: Chang Chih-ho, fl. 8th century) was a Chinese philosopher, poet, politician, and spiritual writer.

A native of Jinhua in modern Zhejiang, he was of a romantic turn of mind and especially fond of Taoist speculations. He took office under the Emperor Suzung of the Tang dynasty, but got into some trouble and was banished. Soon after this he shared in a general pardon; whereupon he fled to the woods and mountains and became a wandering recluse, calling himself "the Old Fisherman of the Mists and Waters" (烟波钓叟). He spent his time angling, but used no bait, his object not being to catch fish. When Lu Yu asked him why he roamed about, Zhang answered and said, "With the empyrean as my home, the bright moon my constant companion, and the Four Seas my inseparable friends, — what mean you by roaming?" And when a friend offered him a comfortable home instead of his poor boat, he replied, "I prefer to follow the gulls into cloudland, rather than to bury my ethereal self beneath the dust of the world." He was the author of the Yuan Zhen Zi (元真子), a work on the conservation of vitality.
