= Shanshui poetry =

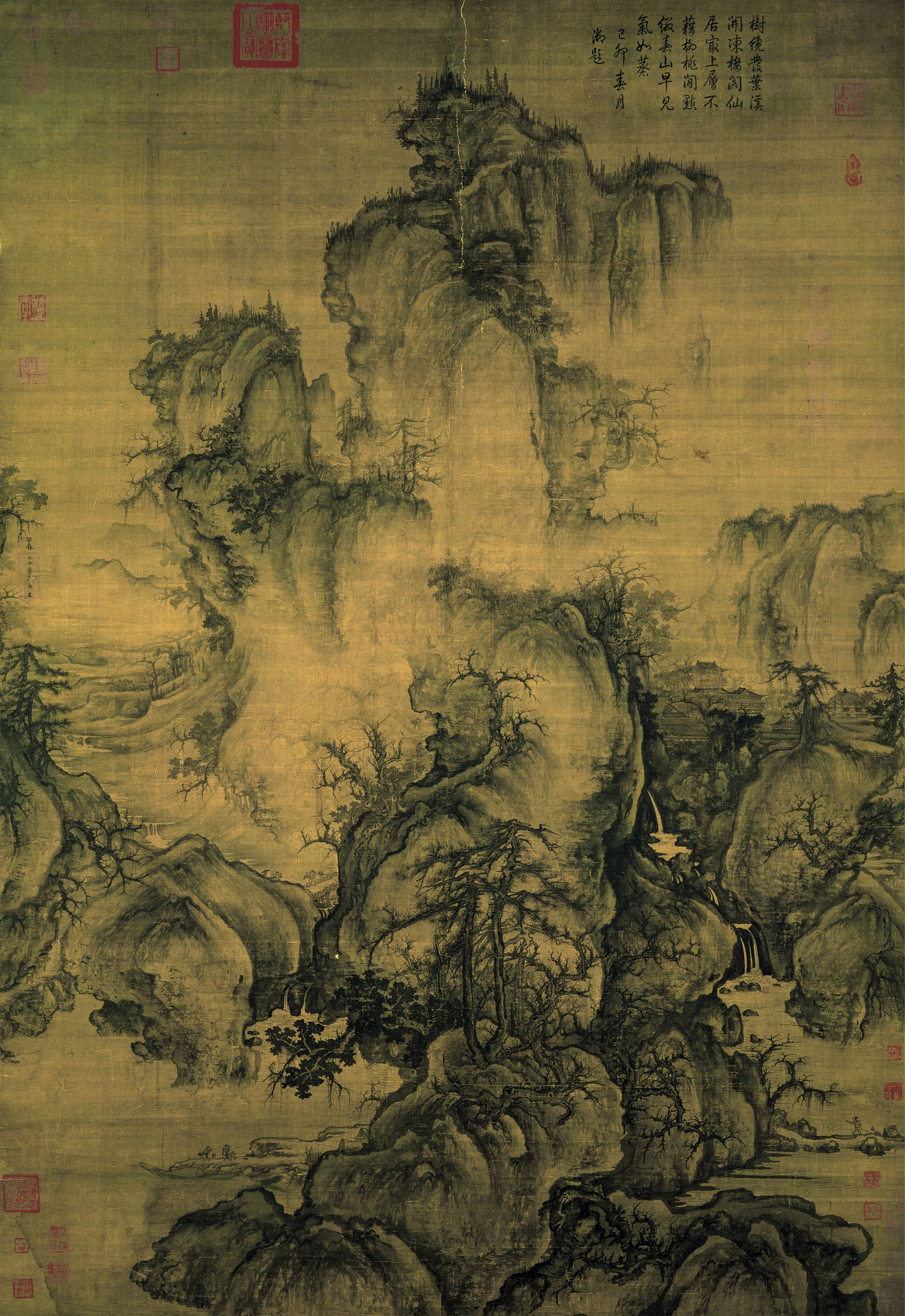
Guo Xi - Early Spring

Shanshui poetry or Shanshui shi (traditional Chinese: 山水詩; simplified Chinese: 山水诗; pinyin: shānshuǐshī; lit. "mountains and rivers poetry") refers to the movement in poetry, influenced by the shan shui (landscape) painting style, which became known as Shanshui poetry, or "landscape poetry". Sometimes, the poems were designed to be viewed with a particular work of art, others were intended to be "textual art" that evoked an image inside a reader's mind. It is one of the more important Classical Chinese poetry genres. Developing in the third and fourth centuries in China, Shanshui poetry contributed to the process of forming a unique aesthetic outlook.

== Development ==
Although landscape images were present in the Shijing and the Chuci, the unique development in Shanshui poetry was that the main focus became on the natural landscape, rather than the use of nature as a backdrop for the human presence. The Six Dynasties poet and government official Xie Lingyun has been dubbed not only Duke of Kangle but also the father of Shan-shui poetry.

== Prominent practitioners ==
One of the first practitioners of the Shanshui style was the Han dynasty warlord and revered Jian'an poet Cao Cao (155-220). The poems resulting from the Orchid Pavilion Gathering were particularly important, too. During the Tang Dynasty, Meng Haoran and Wang Wei were both important practitioners.

== See also ==
- Chinese poetry
- Classical Chinese poetry
- Fields and Gardens poetry
- Orchid Pavilion Gathering
- Shan shui (painting)
- Topographical poetry
- Wangchuan ji
- Wenzhou
