= Wang Han (poet) =

- Traditional Chinese: 王翰
- Simplified Chinese: 王翰
Transcriptions
Standard Mandarin
- Hanyu Pinyin: Wáng Hàn
- Wade–Giles: Wang^{2} Han^{4}

Wang Han (alternate spelling)
- Traditional Chinese: 王瀚
- Simplified Chinese: 王瀚
Transcriptions
Standard Mandarin
- Hanyu Pinyin: Wáng Hàn

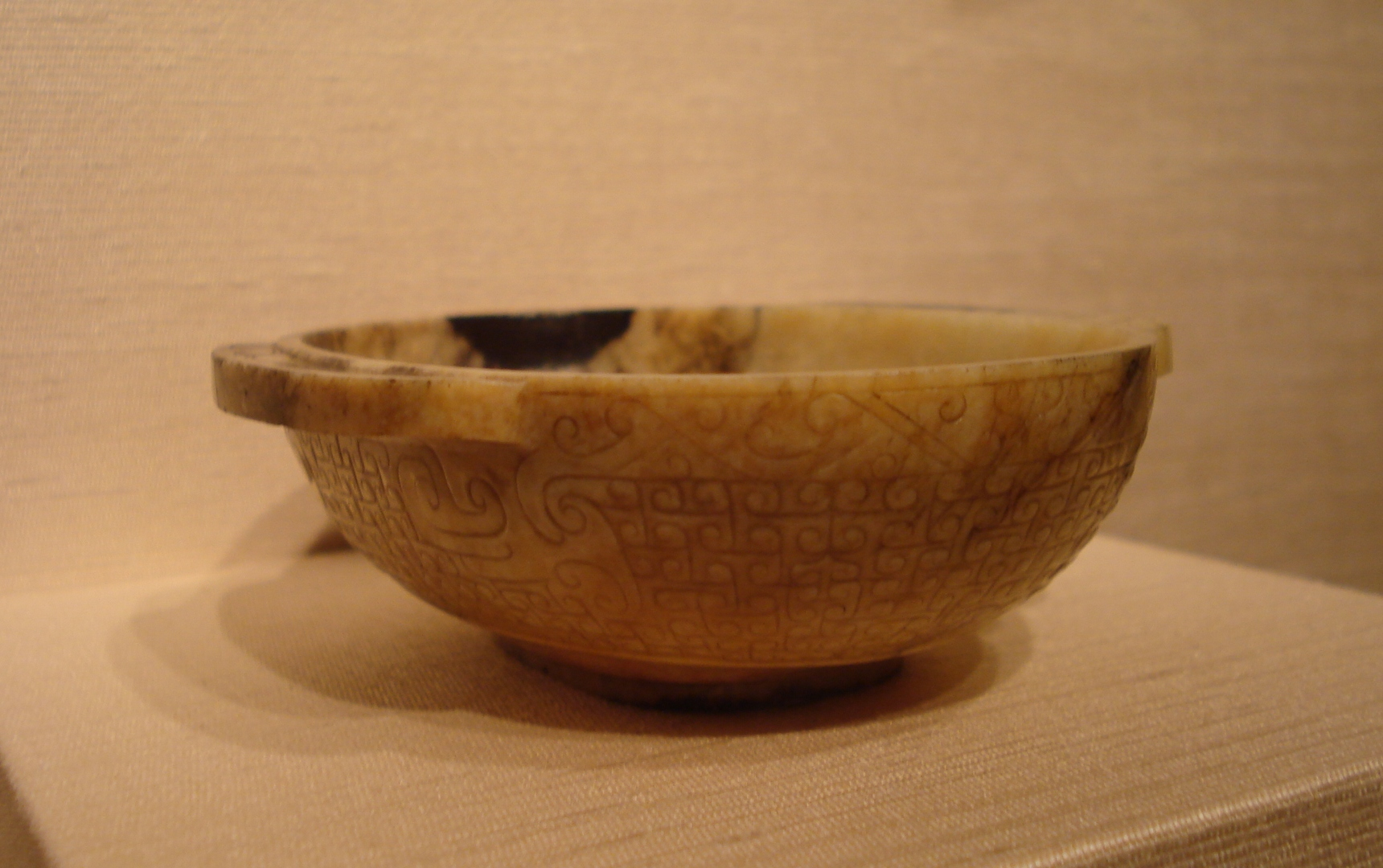
Jade wine cup, Western Han dynasty

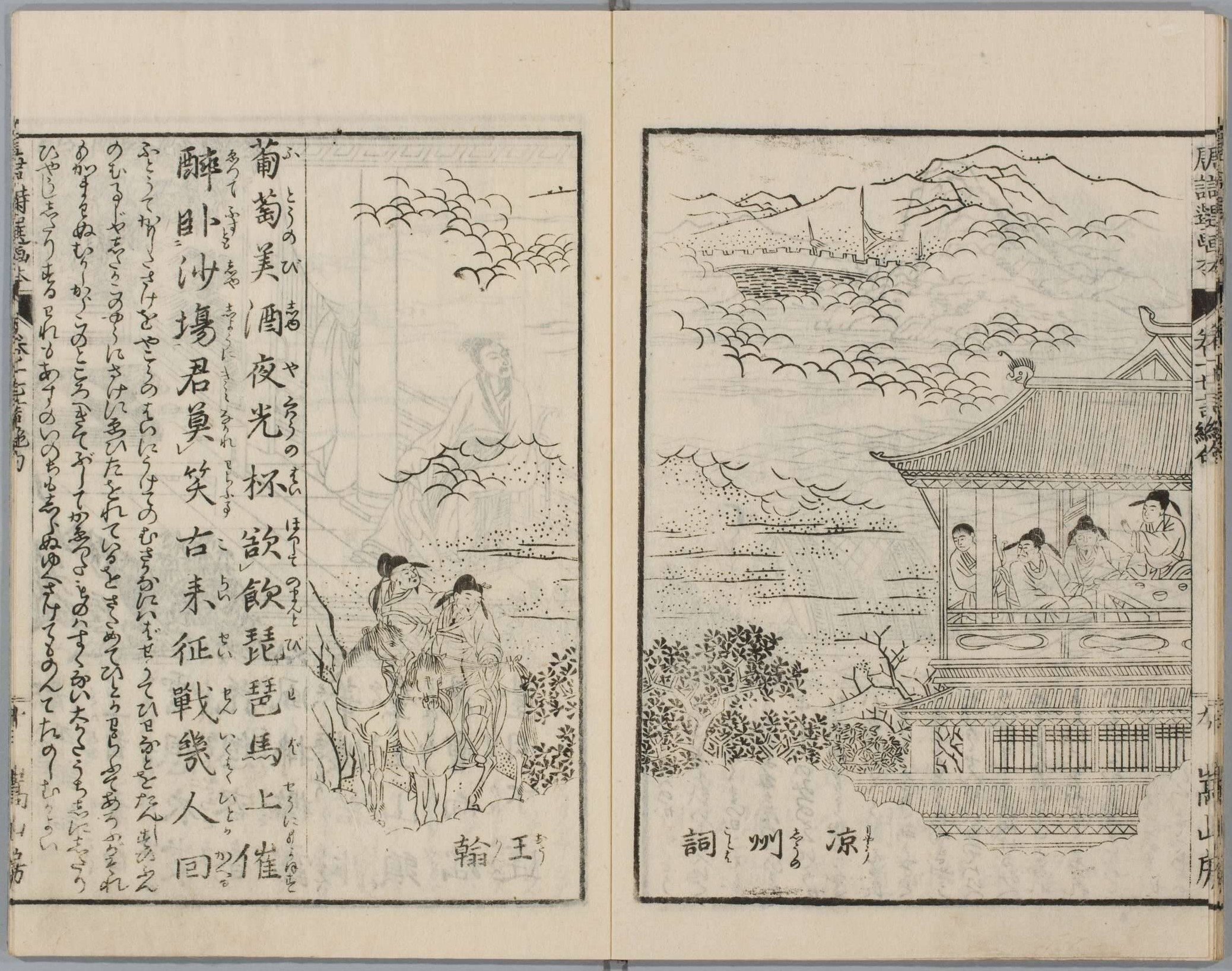
"Song of Liangzhou" by Wang Han, in a Japanese edition of selected Tang poems with illustrations (1836).

Wang Han (Chinese: 王翰; pinyin: Wáng Hàn; or 王瀚; courtesy name 子羽, pinyin: Zǐyǔ) was an early eighth century Chinese poet of the Tang dynasty, who had one of his poems included in the famous anthology Three Hundred Tang Poems.

== Poetry ==
Wan Han had one poem collected in Three Hundred Tang Poems, a seven-syllable line quatrain (referred to as a cí in the title), which was translated by Witter Bynner as "A Song of Liangzhou". This poem discusses the vicissitudes of war, contrasting the threat of death with the music of the pipa and drinking grape wine out of luminous cups (夜光杯) of a traditional regional sort.

=== "A Song of Liangzhou" ===
涼州詞 (王翰)

葡萄美酒夜光杯，欲飲琵琶馬上催。
醉臥沙場君莫笑，古來征戰幾人回。

A SONG OF LIANGZHOU
(by Wang Han, translated by Witter Bynner)

They sing, they drain their cups of jade,
They strum on horseback their guitars.
...Why laugh when they fall asleep drunk on the sand ? –
How many soldiers ever come home?

(267)

==== Liangzhou ====
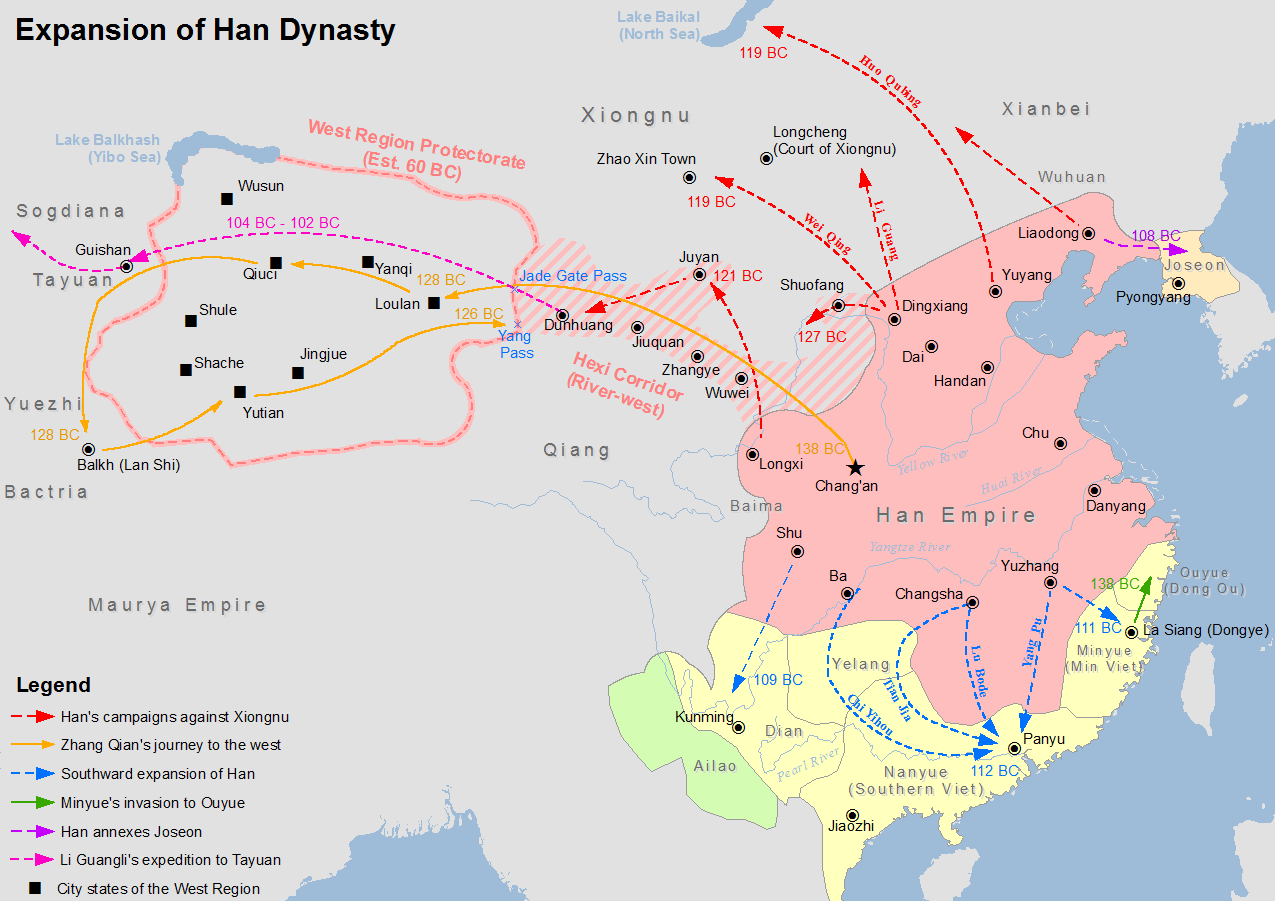
Map of the Han–Xiongnu War. Liangzhou is approximately shown as the Hexi Corridor, reaching from the Chinese heartland into Central Asia, and points beyond.

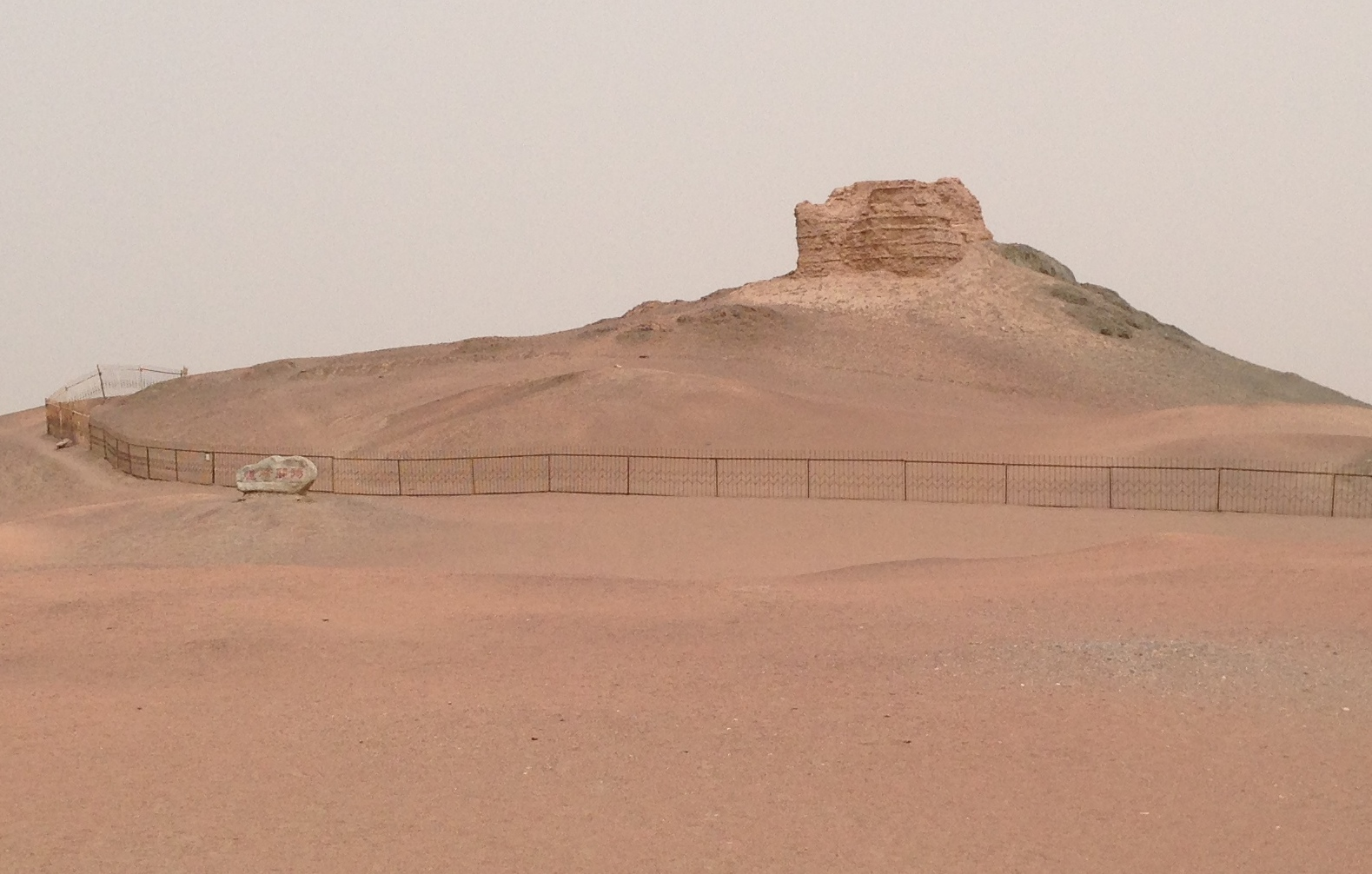
The land of Liangzhou tended toward the arid, sandy, and dusty, as suggested by this remnant of the poetically important Yangguan Tower outpost.

The title of this poem refers to the sometimes province of Liangzhou, formed as part of the Han conquest of parts of the Xiongnu empire of the 120s BCE, in the Han–Xiongnu War. Settlement of Liangzhou occurred thereafter, although this crucial transportation corridor was subsequently lost, only later to be regained by a newly reunified China - events remembered in Tang poetry, including by Wang Han. The Hexi Corridor served to connect China proper with the Western Regions, which helped secure important parts of the Silk Road into Central Asia. This was paralleled in the Sui-Tang dynastic era, and is also a key transport route in modern times.

==== Pipa ====
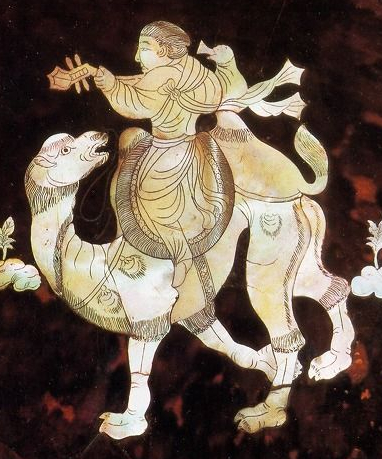
Pipa play on camel

The pipa (Chinese: 琵琶) is a four-stringed Chinese musical instrument, belonging to the plucked category of instruments. Sometimes called the Chinese lute, the instrument has a pear-shaped wooden body with a varying number of frets ranging from 12 to 26. Another Chinese four-string plucked lute is the liuqin, which looks like a smaller version of the pipa. The pear-shaped instrument may have existed in China as early as the Han dynasty, and although historically the term pipa was once used to refer to a variety of plucked chordophones, its usage since the Song dynasty refers exclusively to the pear-shaped instrument. The pipa (translated by Bynner as "guitar") is one of the most popular Chinese instruments and has been played for almost two thousand years in China.

==== Cí form ====
Cí (詞) developed into a type of lyric poetry in the tradition of Classical Chinese poetry: generally cí use a set of poetic meters derived from a base set of certain patterns, in fixed-rhythm, fixed-tone, and variable line-length formal types, or model examples, with rhythmic and tonal pattern based upon a musical song tune. Surviving textual examples of cí date from the 8th century CE Dunhuang manuscripts (Fränkel 1978, 216). Beginning in the poetry of the Liang dynasty (梁朝), the cí were lyrics which developed from anonymous popular songs into a sophisticated literary genre, and at times having influences from Central Asia. In this case, however, Wang Han seems to have used the term cí to refer to a poetic form of regular syllable line lengths, but with a suggestion of Central Asia, at least in the topic area.

== Biography ==
Most detailed biographical information regarding Wang Han's life is unknown, including the years of his birth and death. However, Wang Han's life is known to date to the early eighth century (Wu 1972, 124, and 225), part of the Tang dynasty era. He is associated with Jinyang (modern Taiyuan, Shanxi), part of a middle-class family.

== Internal links ==
- "Liangzhou Ci" (涼州詞) text (Chinese)
- 王翰 (唐朝)
