= Chang Jian =

Chang Jian (c. 708 – c. 765, Chinese: 常建; pinyin: Cháng Jiàn, early part 8th century), and whose name, especially in older English transliteration, appears as "Ch'ang Chien", was a poet of the Tang dynasty, and two of whose poems were collected in the popular anthology Three Hundred Tang Poems.

== Biography ==
Chang Jian seems to be connected with the stratagem of "Tossing out a brick to get a jade gem" of the Thirty-Six Stratagems.

== Poetry ==
Chang Jian is best known for his two poems which are included in the Three Hundred Tang Poems, translated by Witter Bynner as "At Wang Changling's Retreat" (a reference to the poet Wang Changling) and "A Buddhist Retreat Behind Broken-mountain Temple" (modern Xinfu temple in Changshu, Suzhou of Jiangsu province) .
