= Pei Di =

Chinese poet of the Tang dynasty

- 裴迪
- Born: 714
- Occupation: Poet
- Writing career
- Notable works: "A Farewell to Cui", The Wang River Collection

Pei Di (Chinese: 裴迪; pinyin: Péi Dí; Wade–Giles: P'ei Ti) was a Chinese poet of the Tang dynasty, approximate year of birth 714, with twenty preserved poems in the Wangchuan ji poetry collection and one work included in the popular Three Hundred Tang Poems. Pei Di was a contemporary of Wang Wei, although younger by fifteen years. The Wangchuan ji poetry collaboration between Pei Di and Wang Wei collects twenty matching poems by Wang Wei and Pei Di. The name is also rendered into English as "P'ei Ti" or "Pei Shidi" (shi = 十). The close personal friendship between Wang Wei and Pei Di is preserved in a letter by Wang Wei inviting Pei for a Springtime visit together at Wang's country estate. This letter has been translated by Arthur Waley. Pei also had a poetic relationship with Du Fu. Other than through Pei Di's few surviving poems, and the poems addressed to him by Wang Wei and Du Fu, "pitifully little" is known about Pei Di, other than that he had a reasonably successful government career. According to one source, Pei Di: saved Wang's life by smuggling one of his poems out of prison—proof he was being held by the rebels against his will. The two were separated at last when Pei Di was made governor of Szechuan, then a wild, remote place, reachable only by treacherous plank paths hung from the sides of cliffs."

== Poems ==
One of Pei Di's poems has been translated by Witter Bynner as "A Farewell to Cui", a farewell poem dedicated to a friend named Cui, was included in the important collection Three Hundred Tang Poems, as exemplary of the five-character (line length) version of the quatrain style known as juéjù, or "cut verse". Pei Di is also famous for his collaboration with Wang Wei: this series of poems (the Wangchuan ji) has been translated into English as "The Wang River Collection", or similarly. Consisting of twenty preserved titles, for each title Wang Wei wrote a pair of couplets loosely inspired by landscape features around his country estate. These were then matched by a pair of couplets on the same theme by Pei Di. These and a few other poems by Pei Di are preserved in Scroll 129 of the Quantangshi.

== Wang Wei's letter to Pei Di ==
A letter from Wang Wei to his friend Pei Di (here transliterated P'ei Ti) is preserved, and has been translated by Arthur Waley:

PROSE LETTER

_To the Bachelor-of-Arts P`ei Ti_

Of late during the sacrificial month, the weather has been calm and clear, and I might easily have crossed the mountain. But I knew that you were conning the classics and did not dare disturb you. So I roamed about the mountain-side, rested at the Kan-p`ei Temple, dined with the mountain priests, and, after dinner, came home again. Going northwards, I crossed the Yuuan-pa, over whose waters the unclouded moon shone with dazzling rim. When night was far advanced, I mounted Hua-tzuu's Hill and saw the moonlight tossed up and thrown down by the jostling waves of Wang River. On the wintry mountain distant lights twinkled and vanished; in some deep lane beyond the forest a dog barked at the cold, with a cry as fierce as a wolf's. The sound of villagers grinding their corn at night filled the gaps between the slow chiming of a distant bell.

Now I am sitting alone. I listen, but cannot hear my grooms and servants move or speak. I think much of old days: how hand in hand, composing poems as we went, we walked down twisting paths to the banks of clear streams.

We must wait for Spring to come: till the grasses sprout and the trees bloom. Then wandering together in the spring hills we shall see the trout leap lightly from the stream, the white gulls stretch their wings, the dew fall on the green moss. And in the morning we shall hear the cry of curlews in the barley-fields.

It is not long to wait. Shall you be with me then? Did I not know the natural subtlety of your intelligence, I would not dare address to you so remote an invitation. You will understand that a deep feeling dictates this course.

Written without disrespect by Wang Wei, a dweller in the mountains.

== Legacy ==
Pei Di's influence on posterity mainly derives from his contributions to the Wangchuan Ji anthology, consisting of 20 of his poems written as responsive matches to 20 of Wang Wei's. The series has inspired various subsequent works, including translations into English by Jerome Ch'en and Michael Bullock and by H. C. Chang. Also, many centuries later, Witter Bynner translated the one Pei Di poem included in the Three Hundred Tang Poems (229) as "Pei Di A FAREWELL TO CUI", a poem which thus remains historically as one of the more reprinted poems. As this poem appears in Bynner's Three Hundred Tang Poems:

送崔九

歸山深淺去， 須盡丘壑美。
莫學武陵人， 暫遊桃源裡。

A FAREWELL TO CUI

Though you think to return to this maze of mountains,
Oh, let them brim your heart with wonder!....
Remember the fisherman from Wuling
Who had only a day in the Peach-Blossom Country.

Poetic Note: The final two lines of this poem are a reference to The Peach Blossom Spring by Tao Yuanming (also known as Tao Qian).

In the same Three Hundred Tang Poems (115), a poem by Wang Wei addressed to Pei Di is also included, again with the Witter Bynner translation:

五言律詩 王維 輞川閑居贈 裴秀才迪

寒山轉蒼翠， 秋水日潺湲。
倚杖柴門外， 臨風聽暮蟬。
渡頭餘落日， 墟里上孤煙。
復值接輿醉， 狂歌五柳前。

Wang Wei A MESSAGE FROM MY LODGE AT WANGCHUAN
TO PEI DI

The mountains are cold and blue now
And the autumn waters have run all day.
By my thatch door, leaning on my staff,
I listen to cicadas in the evening wind.
Sunset lingers at the ferry,
Supper-smoke floats up from the houses.
...Oh, when shall I pledge the great Hermit again
And sing a wild poem at Five Willows?

Bibliographic note: Wang Wei's reference to Pei Di as xiùcai (秀才) has a strong implication of Pei Di's having passed a county level examination in the imperial examination system.

Poetic notes: In the penultimate line, Wang Wei obliquely refers to Pei (who was also in government service) as 接輿 Jiēyú (also Chieh-yu or "great Hermit or Lu Tong 陸通). This is in reference to an account that Jieyu of Chu (and a famed drinker and somewhat of a recluse) stopped the chariot of Confucius and warned him with a song

O phoenix, O phoenix,
Virtue is corrupted....
Come away! Come away!
Politics are dangerous!

In the last line, Wang expresses the desire to be drinking with Pei at Five Willows. Five Willows is an allusion to Tao Qian, another poet famous for drinking and eventually seeking some level of seclusion after encountering danger as part of a political career.

== See also ==
- Chinese poetry
- Classical Chinese poetry
- Fields and Gardens poetry
- Jueju
- List of Chinese language poets
- Shi (poetry)
- Tang poetry
- Wang Wei (Tang dynasty)
- Wangchuan ji
