= Kanō Tsunenobu =

Japanese painter (1636–1713)

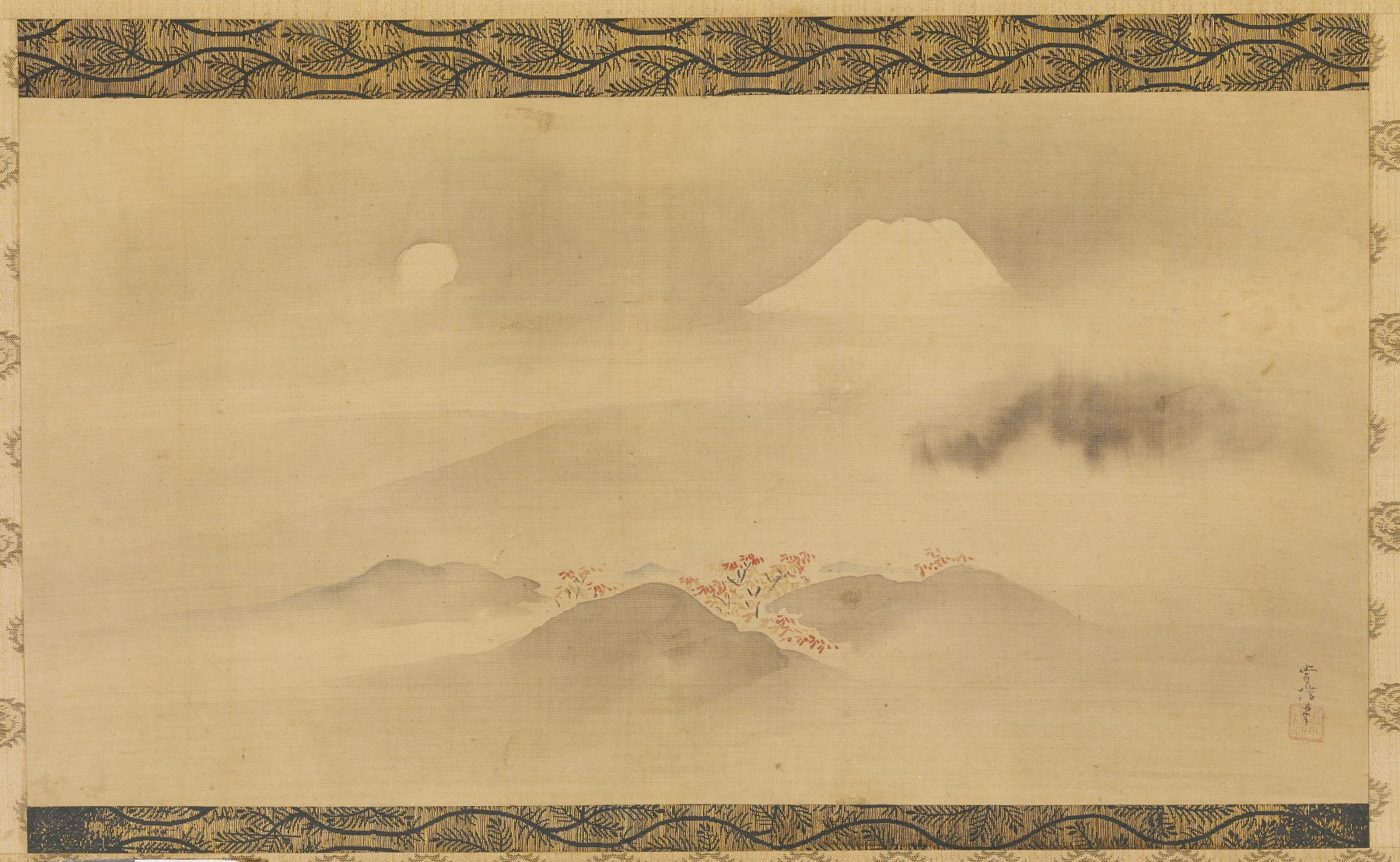
Kanō Tsunenobu, Mount Fuji in the Autumn, from an album, Walters Art Museum

Kanō Tsunenobu (狩野常信) (1636–1713) was a Japanese painter of the Kanō school. He first studied under his father, Kanō Naonobu, and then his uncle, Kanō Tan'yū, after his father's death. He became a master painter and succeeded his uncle Tan'yū as head of the Kanō school in 1674. It is believed many works attributed to Tan'yū might actually be Tsunenobu, but it is difficult to know since they often worked on larger pieces together.
