= Meng Haoran =

Tang dynasty Chinese poet (689/691–740)

- 孟浩然
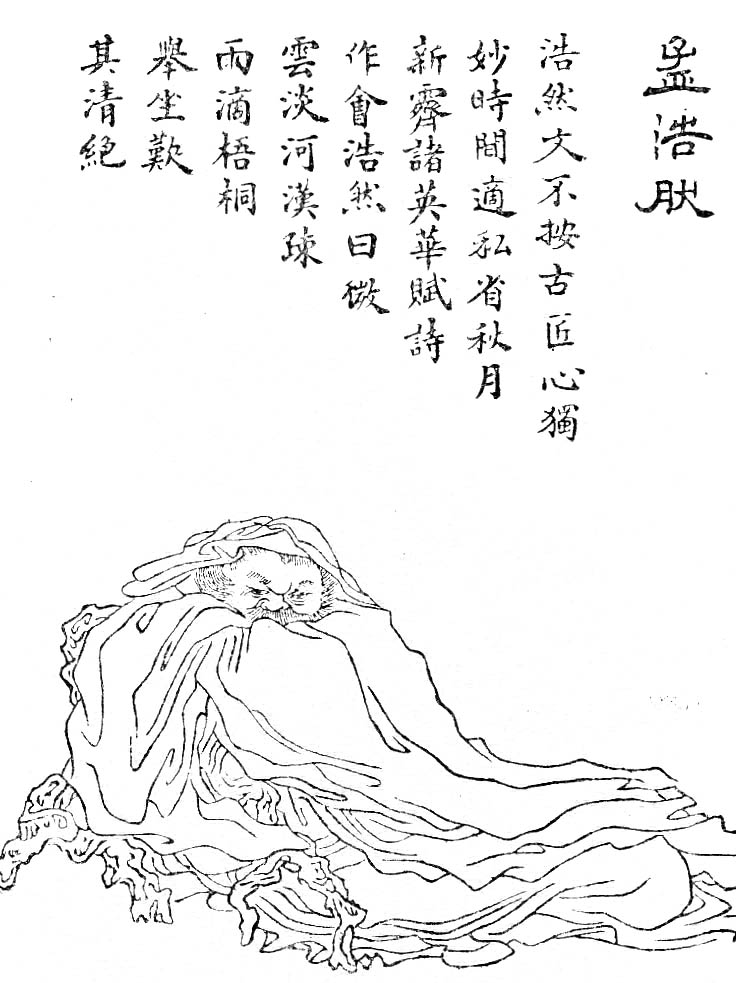
- Born: 689/691; Xiangyang, Hubei, China
- Died: 740 (aged 50–51); 740 (aged 48–49); Xiangyang, Hubei, China
- Occupation: Poet
- Children: Meng Yifu (孟儀甫)

Chinese name
- Chinese: 孟浩然
- Hanyu Pinyin: Mèng Hàorán
Transcriptions
Standard Mandarin
- Hanyu Pinyin: Mèng Hàorán
- Gwoyeu Romatzyh: Menq Hawran
- Wade–Giles: Mêng^{4} Hao^{4}-jan^{2}
- Yale Romanization: Mèng Hàurán
- IPA: [mə̂ŋ xâʊ.ɻǎn]
Yue: Cantonese
- Yale Romanization: Maahng Houh-yìhn
- Jyutping: Maang6 Hou6jin4
- IPA: [maŋ˨ hɔw˨.jin˩]
Southern Min
- Hokkien POJ: Bēng Hō-jiân
Middle Chinese
- Middle Chinese: Mɐng ɤâu-ńźjän

Meng Haoran (Chinese: 孟浩然; Wade–Giles: Mêng Hao-jan; 689/691–740) was a Chinese poet and a major literary figure of the Tang dynasty. He was a somewhat older contemporary of Wang Wei, Li Bai and Du Fu. Despite his brief pursuit of an official career, Meng Haoran spent most of his life in and around his hometown Xiangyang in Hubei Province, living like a hermit, while creating poems inspired by its landscapes and milieu.

Meng Haoran was a major influence on both contemporary and subsequent poets of the Tang dynasty due to his proficiency in Shanshui poetry and his disciplined, independent spirit. Meng was prominently featured in the Qing dynasty (and subsequently frequently republished) poetry anthology Three Hundred Tang Poems, having a total of fifteen poems included, the fifth largest number, exceeded only by Du Fu, Li Bai, Wang Wei, and Li Shangyin. These poems of Meng Haoran were made available in English translations by Witter Bynner and Kiang Kanghu with the publication of The Jade Mountain in 1920. In 2021, a complete translation of all Meng's poems by Paul W. Kroll was published as The Poetry of Meng Haoran, which also contains an introduction of Meng's life and historical contexts of his poetry.

The Three Hundred Tang Poems also collected two poems by Li Bai addressed to Meng Haoran, one in his praise and one written in farewell.

== Biography ==
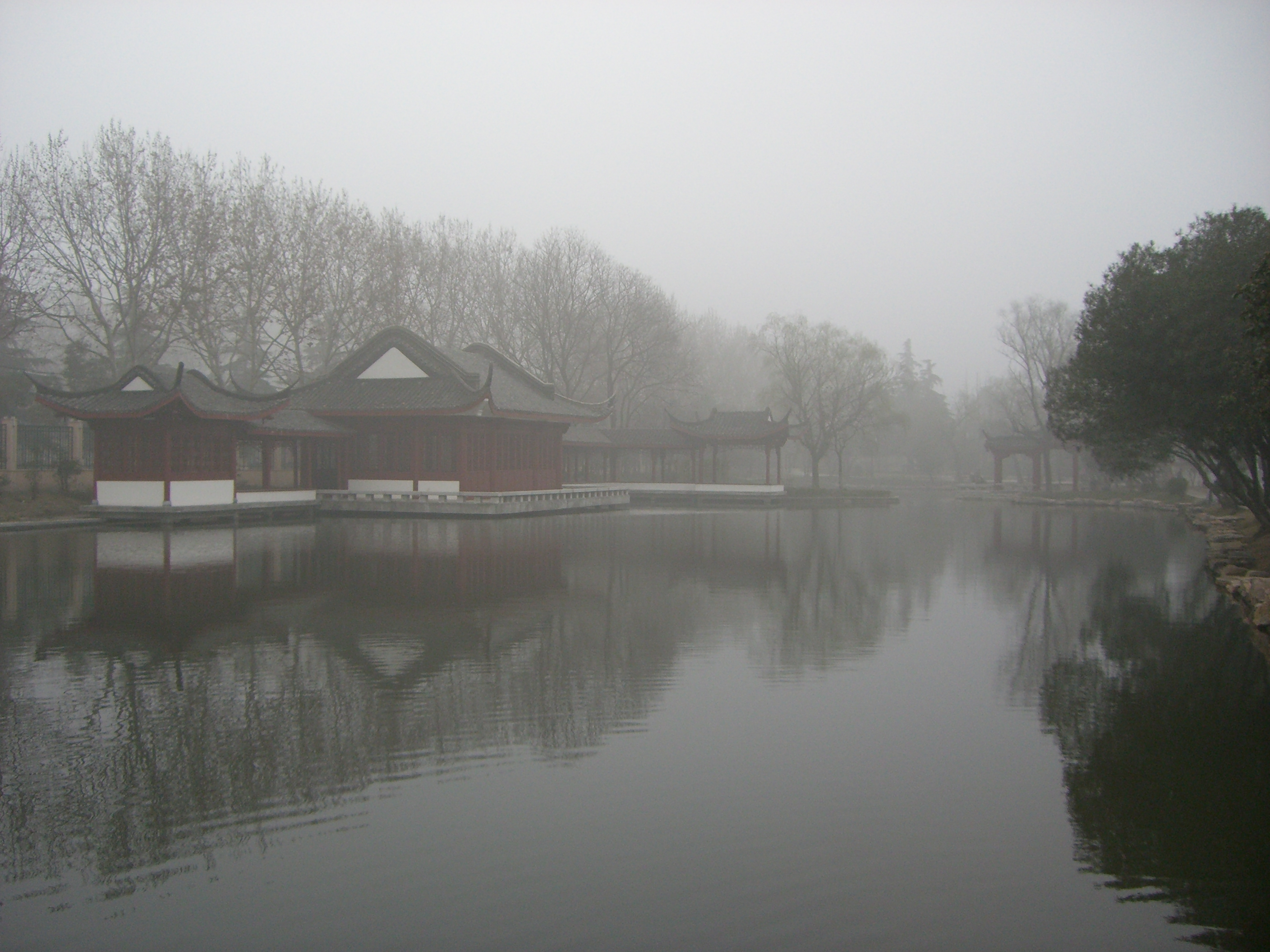
A city park in the former Xiangyang area, Meng Haoran's home territory.

One of the major poets during a peak era of the Tang Poetry, known as the High Tang, Meng Haoran was born in Xiangyang District, Xiangfan, south of the Han River, in the modern province of Hubei. He remained strongly attached to this area and its scenery throughout his life.

He had the desire to pursue a career in politics in his youth, but never succeeded in securing an official position. As recorded by the New Book of Tang, he was recommended by his good friend Wang Wei to Emperor Xuanzong, who granted him an audience, during which he recited his poem. However, one line therein angered the emperor: "The untalented the wise lord discards" (不才明主棄), which Xuanzong interpreted as a sarcastic complaint for not employing him sooner in the imperial government. For this reason, he was sent away from the palace. He received his only quasi-civil service position as an advisor to Zhang Jiuling three years before his death, but resigned after less than a year due to his aloofness and pride. He lived in the Xiangyang area almost all his life, except for a brief trip to the capital city of Chang'an where he was hosted by Wang Wei in 728. The landscape, history and legends of his hometown are the subjects of a majority of his poems. Some particularly prominent landmarks include Nanshan (or South Mountain, his family seat) and Lumen Shan, a temple site, where he briefly lived in retreat from the world at large.

== Works ==
Meng Haoran is often bracketed with Wang Wei, due to the friendship they shared and their prominence as landscape poets. In fact, Meng composed several poems about Wang and their parting. While Wang's work focused on the natural world, in particular the solitude and reprieve it granted from human life along with the scale of the natural world, Meng's poetry focuses more on foreground details and human life, such as returning villagers waiting at the ferry crossing, fishermen, or (often unseen) mountain hermits dwelling in religious seclusion.

Meng's poetic language was as simple as everyday conversation, yet this simplicity did not diminish his poems' careful craftsmanship. Critics have noted that Meng's artistry resides in his adeptness at transforming ordinary daily experiences into enduring poetry.

Meng's quatrain "Spring Morning" (春曉) is one of the best known Tang poems, partly due to its position as the opening selection in the Qian-Jia Shi (Poems of a Thousand Masters), a beginner's anthology of verses widely adopted in elementary school curricula since the late Song dynasty.

春眠不覺曉，
處處聞啼鳥。
夜來風雨聲，
花落知多少。

In spring slumber, I am unaware of daybreak,
Though everywhere I hear the tweet of birds.
Last night came the sound of wind and rain;
Who knows how many flowers must have fallen?

== Reception and legacy ==
Meng was highly regarded by his contemporaries, notably Li Bai and Du Fu, both of whom wrote poems in his praise. According to Du Fu, Meng's poetry surpassed those of Bao Zhao and Xie Lingyun in quality. Li Bai's tribute, on the other hand, honored Meng's noble character and independent spirit. Song dynasty critics believed that Meng's poetry excelled in creativity but lacked depth and breadth in its topics. Su Shi likened Meng's artistry to that of a skilled wine maker with supreme craftsmanship but a shortage of ingredients. 20th century scholar Wen Yiduo aligned with Li Bai in his assessment of Meng, praising his poetry as a genuine expression of his serene demeanor and lifestyle as a hermit.

The themes and styles of Meng Haoran's Shanshui poetry helped to set a convention followed by younger poets, including Wang Wei.

== See also ==
- Classical Chinese poetry
- Meng Jiao
- Tang poetry
- Wang Wei
- Chinese Wikipedia article on relationship to Mencius (孟家) (In Chinese)
