= Wang Tong (philosopher) =

Chinese philosopher and politician (584–617)

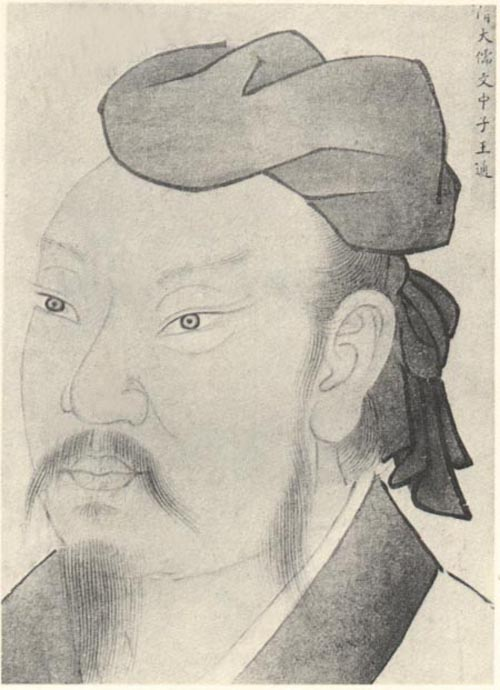
Qing dynasty portrait of Wang Tong

Wang Tong (王通; 584–617), style name Zhongyan (仲淹), posthumous name Master Wenzhong (文中子) was a Chinese philosopher and politician during the Sui dynasty.

== Life ==
Wang Tong was born in Longmen County (modern day Tonghua Township, Wanrong County, Shanxi province) in 587.

Wang Tong was a great student and somewhat of a child prodigy, with legend saying he starting teaching at the age of 15. In 602, he received political office and was made Secretary of Shuzhou. In the year 603, he submitted a memorial to Emperor Wen of the Sui dynasty entitled the "12 Point Plan for Great Peace", advocating for an overhaul of the political system. When his proposals were rejected, Wang Tong lost confidence in the Sui court and resigned his post. Leaving Chang'an, he retired to the Hefen region and dedicated himself fully to teaching. During this time, he also wrote numerous works on Confucian philosophy. His most famous (and only surviving) work is the philosophical treatise Zhongshuo (中说), which was said to have been compiled by his sons shortly after his death (although the circumstances around the compilation of the Zhongshuo still remains a point of scholarly controversy to this day).

The Zhongshuo sought to be a revival of Confucian thought after the turmoil of the Sixteen Kingdoms and Northern and Southern dynasties periods. The work was purposely written in the same style as the Analects and is just as wide-ranging as the original. It comes a myriad of topics, from ideas about education and moral cultivation to what Confucianism can learn from the competing schools of Daoism and Buddhism. With the work and his teachings, Wang Tong sought to revive pre-Qin dynasty Confucianism, and not what he saw as the perverted Confucianism of the Han dynasty.

Wang Tong is the grandfather of Wang Bo, famous poet and one of the Four Paragons of the Early Tang.

== Influence ==
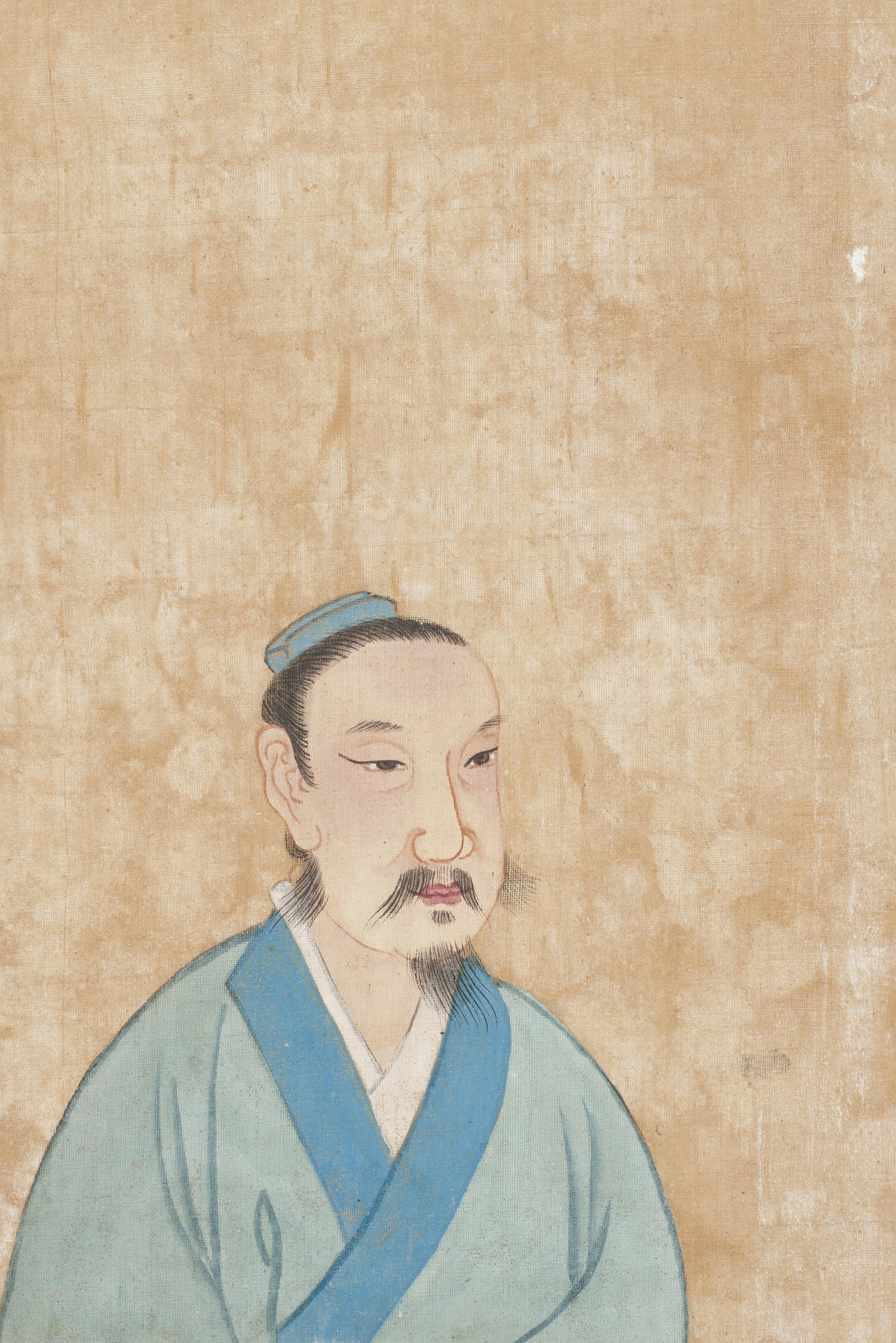
As depicted in the album Portraits of Famous Men c. 1900, housed in the Philadelphia Museum of Art

Wang Tong is a controversial figure in Confucianism. During his life, as well as the period immediately after it, Wang Tong was viewed by the Sui and early Tang courts as being egregiously "out of step with prevailing Confucian ideology", with some scholars suggesting this official disdain led to him not being included in the Book of Sui. Many later Confucians would also take offense to Wang Tong's supposed hubris in emulating the writing style of the Analects and acting as though he were an equal to Confucius himself. Later, detractors in the Qing dynasty would question his very existence, pointing out his youth and various dating discrepancies. Today, there is a broad consensus among both Western and Chinese scholars that Wang Tong was a real Sui dynasty Confucian teacher, although some debate remains over how the Zhongshuo was compiled.

Despite the controversy, Wang Tong's Zhongshuo is undoubtedly an extremely important work in the Confucian canon, and his ideas would prove very influential for many later Confucians. Wang's innovative ideas were said to have enlivened Confucianism after the turmoil of the previous two centuries. His work on political philosophy and the master–subject relationship has been said to have been influential during the early Tang dynasty, especially during the Zhenguan era (貞觀之治) of Tang Taizong (a famous golden era in Chinese history). The Song dynasty philosopher Cheng Yi said that Wang Tong surpassed the famous Han dynasty Confucian Yang Xiong in merit. Later, the eminent Ming dynasty Confucian Wang Yangming praised Wang Tong in his Instructions for Practical Living and defended his emulation of the Confucian Classics, saying that "Master Wenzhong was a worthy scholar" and that famous Neo-Confucian Han Yu was "vastly inferior to Master Wenzhong".

While still poorly studied in modern times, scholarship on Wang Tong has been picking up since the revival of interest in Confucianism that followed the reform and opening up of the late 1970s.
