= The Moon over the River on a Spring Night =

Poem written by Zhang Ruoxu

"The Moon over the River on a Spring Night" (春江花月夜) is a yuefu title originally created by Chen Shubao, the last emperor of the Chen dynasty. Emperor Chen's work did not survive, and the earliest extant works are two poems under the same title by Emperor Yang of Sui, both in the form of five-syllable jueju, and is a part of Chinese traditional music, created using one of the eight Chinese traditional musical instruments, being the metal, stone, silk, bamboo, gourd, clay, leather, and wood.

The most famous work under the title "The Moon over the River on a Spring Night" is a seven-syllable yuefu style long poem by Tang dynasty poet Zhang Ruoxu. It is one of the only two poems by Zhang that preserve. The poem depicts the scenery of the moonlit riverside on a spring night, with elegant wording, a lofty rhythm, and a sophisticated undertone. This poem did not receive much attention during the Tang, Song, and Yuan dynasties. Since Li Panlong of the Ming dynasty included it in the Selected Tang Poems, its reputation has been greatly enhanced. Wang Kaiyun of the Qing dynasty praised it as "a unique piece, ultimately becoming a masterpiece". The influential 20th-century poet Wen Yiduo was especially enthusiastic in his praise, calling it "the poem of all poems, the summit of all summits."

== Music adaption ==
In the early 20th century during the Republic of China era, a traditional pipa piece "Xiao Gu in the Sunset" (夕阳箫鼓) was adapted into a duet for erhu and guzheng, and renamed "The Moon over the River on a Spring Night". Zhang Ruoxu's poem itself was once adapted into a Chinese orchestral music piece by conductor/composer Peng Xiuwen and was widely circulated. In the "Ritual Music" segment of the 2008 Beijing Olympics opening ceremony, performers sang the first two lines of the poem in the style of Kunqu opera: "In spring the river rises as high as the sea, and with the river's rise the moon uprises bright."

== Reception ==
The poem was first found in the Northern Song dynasty Music Bureau Poetry Collection (乐府诗集). It gained attention in literary circles starting from the Ming dynasty when Li Panlong included it in the Anthology of Tang Poems (唐诗选). Later, Tang Ruxun's Exegesis of Tang Poetry (唐诗解), Wang Fuzhi's Annotated Anthology of Tang Poetry (唐诗评选), and Shen Deqian's Selections of Tang Poetry (唐诗别裁) all included this poem. In the Qing dynasty, Wang Kaiyun elevated it to the status of "a one-of-a-kind piece, ultimately becoming a masterpiece," a review that has been adopted by later critics.

Wen Yiduo described it as: "Any comment or analysis on it is blasphemy... It is poetry within poetry, the peak of peaks." Wen held that this poem set the path for High Tang poetry, making it an "invaluable accomplishment". Wen observed a sense of infinity in the poem's depiction of natural scenes. Enthralled by the moonlight shed on the river, the poet transcended human sentimentality and delved into a contemplation of the ultimate reality of the cosmos.

== The verse ==
Below is the original verse with a translation by Xu Yuanchong:

春江花月夜

春江潮水连海平，海上明月共潮生。
滟滟随波千万里，何处春江无月明！
江流宛转绕芳甸，月照花林皆似霰。
空里流霜不觉飞，汀上白沙看不见。
江天一色无纤尘，皎皎空中孤月轮。
江畔何人初见月？江月何年初照人？
人生代代无穷已，江月年年望相似。
不知江月待何人，但见长江送流水。
白云一片去悠悠，青枫浦上不胜愁。
谁家今夜扁舟子？何处相思明月楼？
可怜楼上月裴回，应照离人妆镜台。
玉户帘中卷不去，捣衣砧上拂还来。
此时相望不相闻，愿逐月华流照君。
鸿雁长飞光不度，鱼龙潜跃水成文。
昨夜闲潭梦落花，可怜春半不还家。
江水流春去欲尽，江潭落月复西斜。
斜月沉沉藏海雾，碣石潇湘无限路。
不知乘月几人归，落月摇情满江树.

Translation:
The Moon over the River on a Spring Night

In spring the river rises as high as the sea,
And with the river's rise the moon uprises bright.
She follows the rolling waves for ten thousand li,
And where the river flows, there overflows her light.
The river winds around the fragrant islet where
The blooming flowers in her light all look like snow.
You cannot tell her beams from hoar frost in the air,
Nor from white sand upon Farewell Beach below.
No dust has stained the water blending with the skies;
A lonely wheel like moon shines brilliant far and wide.
Who by the riverside first saw the moon arise?
When did the moon first see a man by riverside?
Many generations have come and pasted away;
From year to year the moons look alike, old and new.
We do not know tonight for whom she sheds her ray,
But hear the river say to its water adieu.
Away, away is sailing a single cloud white;
On Farewell Beach pining away maples green.
Where is the wanderer sailing his boat tonight?
Who, pining away, on the moonlit rails would learn?
Alas! The moon is lingering over the tower;
It should have seen her dressing table all alone.
She may roll curtains up, but light is still in her bower;
She may wash, but moonbeams still remain on the stone.
She sees the moon, but her husband is out of sight;
She would follow the moonbeams to shine on his face.
But message-bearing swans can't fly out of moonlight,
Nor letter-sending fish can leap out of their place.
He dreamed of flowers falling o'er the pool last night;
Alas! Spring has half gone, but he can't homeward go.
The water bearing spring will run away in flight;
The moon over the pool will sink low.
In the mist on the sea the slanting moon will hide;
It's a long way between northern hills to southern streams.
How many can go home by moonlight on the tide?
The sinking moon sheds o'ver riverside trees but dreams.

— Xu Yuanchong
