= Humble Administrator's Garden =

The Humble Administrator's Garden
UNESCO World Heritage Site
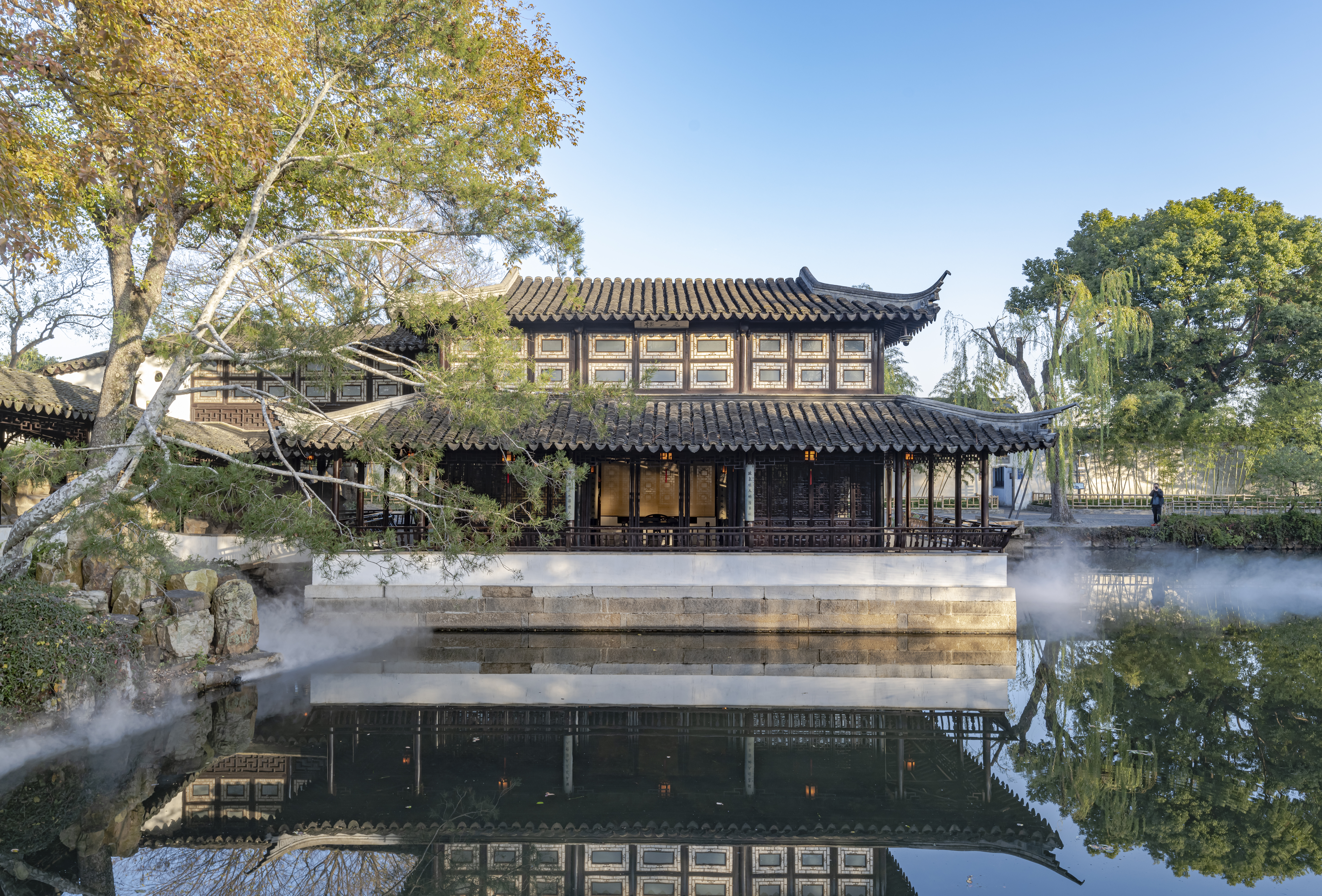

- Location within Jiangsu Location within China
- Location: Suzhou, Jiangsu, China
- Part of: Classical Gardens of Suzhou
- Criteria: Cultural: (i)(ii)(iii)(iv)(v)
- Reference: 813bis-001
- Inscription: 1997 (21st Session)
- Extensions: 2000
- Area: 5.195 ha (12.84 acres)
- Coordinates: 31°19′36.20″N 120°37′32.30″E

Humble Administrator's Garden
- "Humble Administrator's Garden" in Simplified (top) and Traditional (bottom) Chinese
- Simplified Chinese: 拙政园
- Traditional Chinese: 拙政園
- Wugniu: tseq^{7} tsen^{5} yoe^{2}
Transcriptions
Standard Mandarin
- Hanyu Pinyin: Zhuōzhèng yuán
- Wade–Giles: Cho^{1}-cheng^{4} yüan^{2}
- IPA: [ʈʂwó.ʈʂə̂ŋ ɥɛ̌n]
Wu
- Wugniu: tseq^{7} tsen^{5} yoe^{2}
- IPA: Suzhounese: [tsəʔ˥ tsen˥˨ ɦyø] Shanghainese: [tsəʔ˧ tsen˥ ɦyø˨˩]
Yue: Cantonese
- Yale Romanization: Jyut-jing yùhn
- Jyutping: Zyut3-zing3 jyun4
- IPA: [tsyt̚˧.tsɪŋ˧ jyn˩]
Southern Min
- Tâi-lô: Tsuat-tsìng hn̂g

The Humble Administrator's Garden is a Chinese garden in Suzhou, a UNESCO World Heritage Site and one of the most famous of the gardens of Suzhou. The garden is located at 178 Northeast Street (东北街178号; 東北街178號), Gusu District. At 78 mu (亩; 畝) (5.2 ha; 13 acres), it is the largest garden in Suzhou and is considered by some to be the finest garden in all of southern China. In 1997, Humble Administrator's Garden was named a UNESCO World Heritage Site as a component of the Classical Gardens of Suzhou.

== History ==
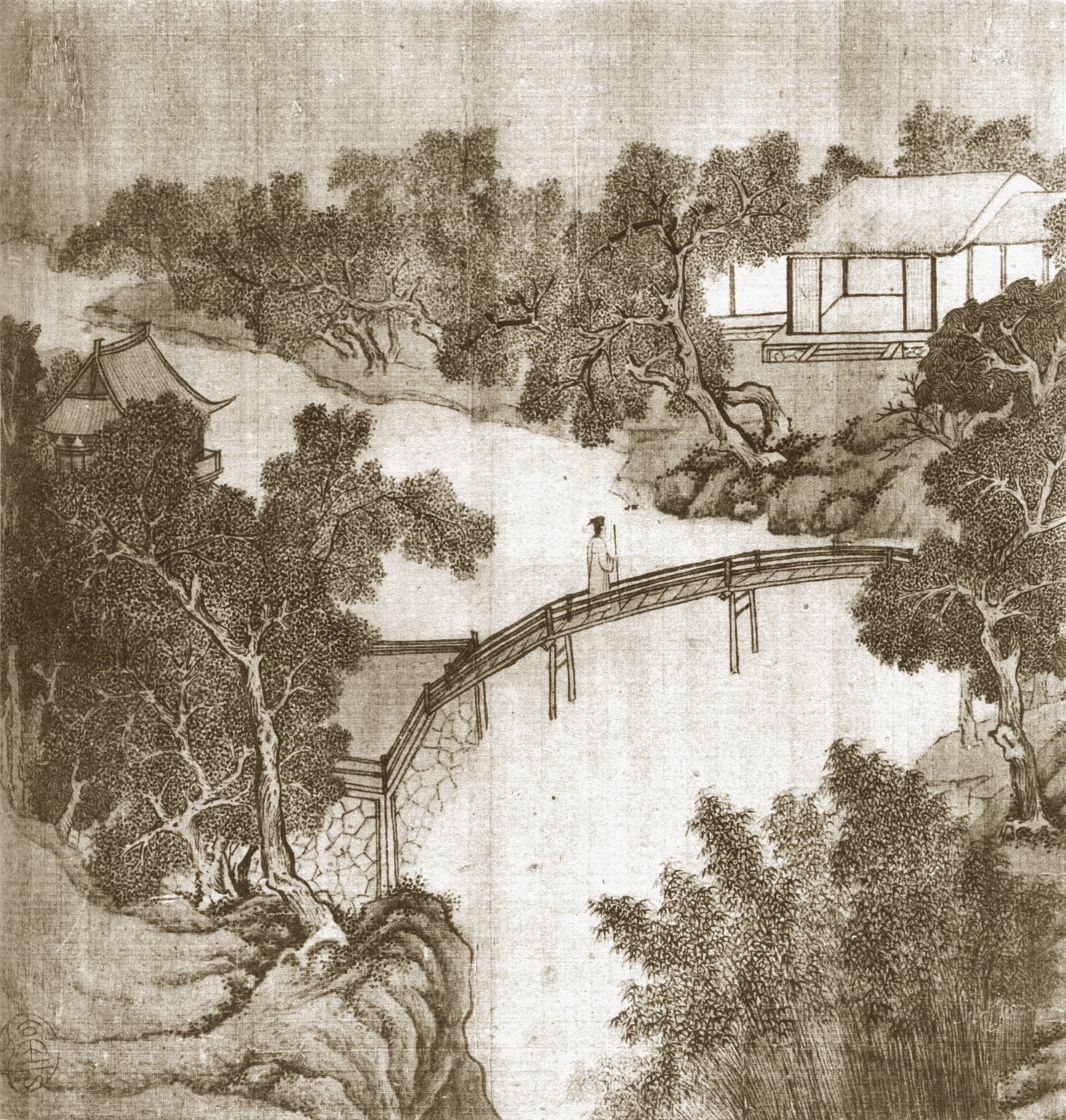
Sketch of the garden by Wen Zhengming

On the garden's site was first built a garden during the Shaoxing period (1131–1162) of the Southern Song dynasty. Afterwards it changed ownership, and was destroyed or modified continually. It was the residence and garden of Lu Guimeng, a Tang dynasty scholar. Later in the Yuan dynasty it became the Dahong Temple's garden.

In 1513, Wang Xianchen, an Imperial Envoy and poet of the Ming dynasty, created a garden on the site of the dilapidated Dahong Temple which had been burnt during the Ming conquest. In 1510, he retired to his native home of Suzhou on the occasion of his father's death. He had experienced a tumultuous official life punctuated by various demotions and promotions, and gave up his last official post as magistrate of Yongjia county in Zhejiang province, and began to work on the garden. This garden, meant to express his fine taste, received close attention from the renowned artist, Suzhou native, and friend, Wen Zhengming. The garden was named (first evidence around 1517) after a verse by the famous scholar official of the Jin dynasty, Pan Yue, in his prose, An Idle Life, "I enjoy a carefree life by planting trees and building my own house...I irrigate my garden and grow vegetables for me to eat...such a life suits a retired official like me well". This verse symbolized Wang's desire to retire from politics and adopt a hermit's life in the manner of Tao Yuanming. In the Xianju rhyme-prose, he writes 'This is the way of ruling for an unsuccessful politician'. It took 16 years until 1526 to complete. Wen Zhengming wrote an essay Notes of Wang's Humble Administrator's Garden, and painted Landscapes of the Humble Administrator's Garden in 1533 including 31 paintings and poems to commemorate the garden. Wen produced a second album of eight leaves showing sites in the garden in 1551, with different views but the same poems as in 1533.

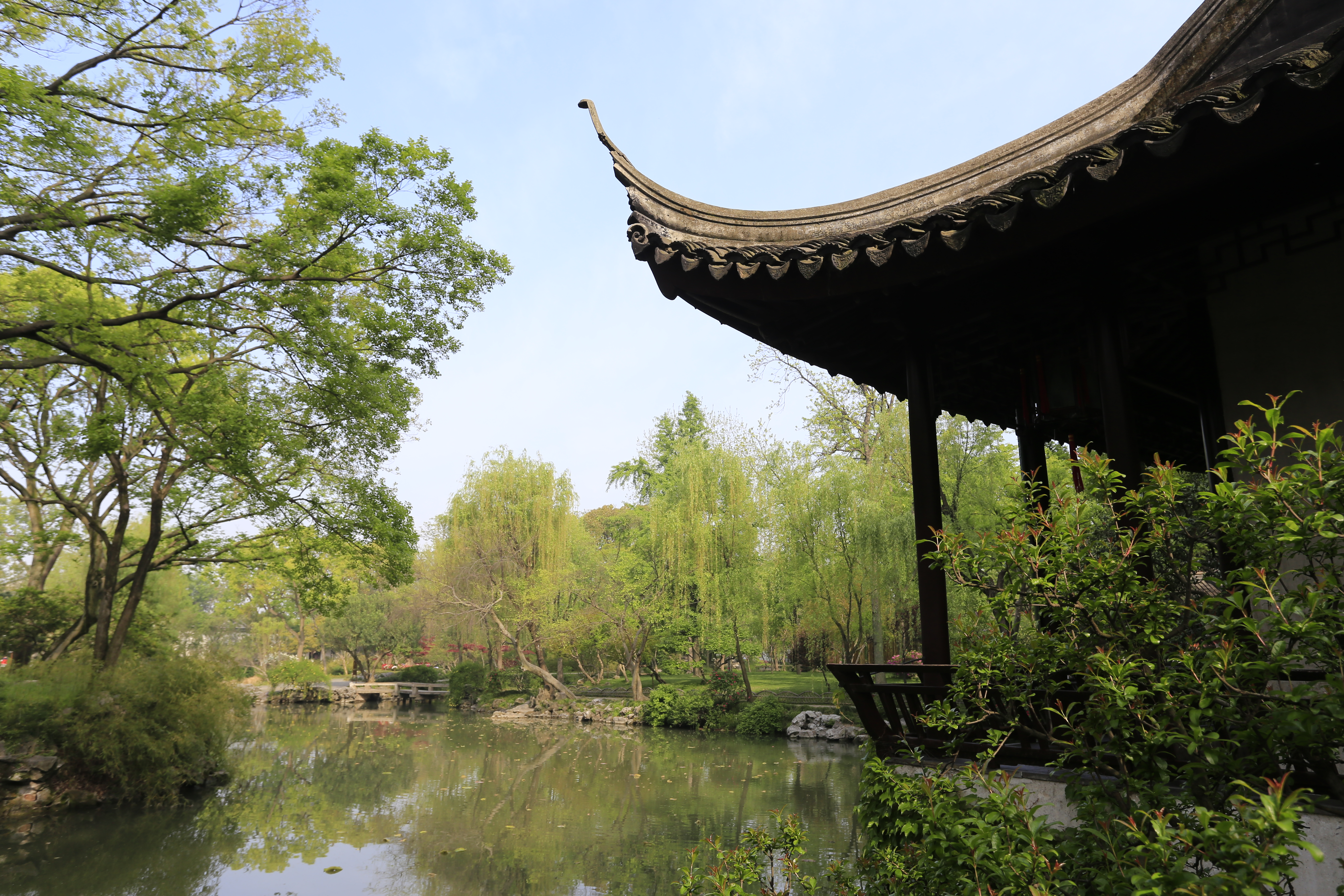
Eastern Garden (Dwelling Upon Return to the Countryside)

Wang's son lost the garden to pay gambling debts, and it has changed hands many times since. In 1631 the eastern garden was divided from the rest and purchased by Wang Xinyi, Vice Minister of the Justice Board. He added many modifications over the next four years, finishing work in 1635. After completion it was renamed Dwelling Upon Return to the Countryside (歸田園居). The central garden was purchased by Jiang Qi, Governor of Jiangsu in 1738. After extensive renovations he renamed it Garden Rebuilt. In 1860, it became the residence of a Taiping prince, Li Xiucheng, and it was remodelled, and the current aspect of the garden is said to be inherited from this period. Also in 1738 the Western Garden was purchased by Ye Shikuan Chief Histographer, and renamed The Garden of Books. The Garden of Books was purchased by a Suzhou merchant, Zhang Lüqian, in 1877 and renamed The Subsidiary Garden. In 1949 all three parts of the garden were rejoined by the Chinese government and subsequently opened to the public, then restored in 1952. In 1997 the garden was given UNESCO World Heritage status.

Cao Xueqin, author of the Dream of the Red Chamber, is supposed to have lived at the garden during his teenage years – around 1735. Among Chinese scholars, it is believed that much of the garden in his novel Dream of the Red Chamber was inspired by the scenery of the Humble Administrator's Garden.

== Design ==
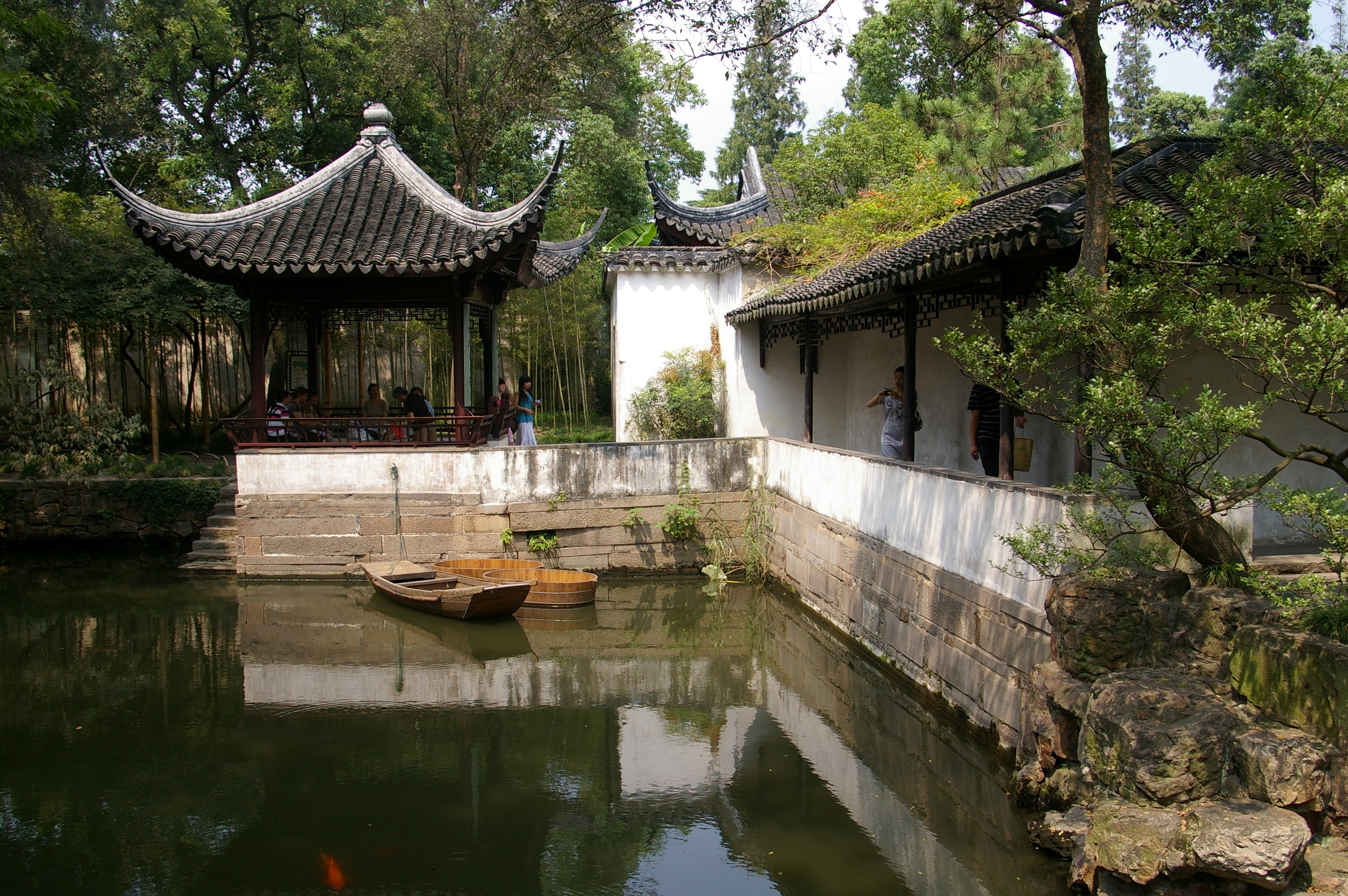
The Humble Administrator's Garden

The garden contains numerous pavilions and bridges set among a maze of connected pools and islands. It consists of three major parts set about a large lake: the central part (Zhuozheng Yuan), the eastern part (once called Guitianyuanju, Dwelling Upon Return to the Countryside), and a western part (the Supplementary Garden). The house lies in the south of the garden. In total, the garden contains 48 different buildings with 101 tablets, 40 steles, 21 precious old trees, and over 700 Suzhou-style penjing/penzai. According to Lou Qingxi, compared with the layout from the Zhenghe period in the Ming dynasty, the garden "now has more buildings and islets", and although lacks a "lofty" feeling, it is "still a masterpiece of meticulous work". Liu Dunzhen judged that the arrangement of rocks and water in the ponds of the central third may have its origins in the early Qing. The western third retains the late nineteenth-century layout, while the eastern third has seen several renovation since. (Note: (Clunas 1996) cites) But Clunas believes that even this is unreasonably optimistic, and he underlines that Liu Dunzhen and others tend to imply that, "despite the vicissitudes of history, there is continuity at the much more important level of essence".

Xue Zhijian, the curator of the garden and of the Suzhou Garden Museum, explained the exquisite design and aesthetic value of the Humble Administrator's Garden, the largest of Suzhou's gardens. "This style of Suzhou old style garden has numerous layers," Xue says. "There are four particular components: the stone, the plant, the architecture and the water." And these are woven together in endless combinations. At one corner in the Humble Administrator's Garden, rocks cutthrough the wall, making viewers feel like they are exploring a mountain, despite the fact that they are in the middle of the city. The plants here represent various seasons, peonies for spring, lotus for summer, osmanthus in the winter time and plum blooms in winter.

Eastern Garden: Composed of a few buildings around a central great lawn and pond combination. The lawn is ringed by a grove of crape myrtle trees in allusion to the Tang dynasty State Secretariat which was nicknamed the Crape Myrtle Department.

Central Garden: This section is composed of many scenes arranged around the "Surging Wave" Pond. Within the pond three islands recreate the scenery of the fairy islands of the east sea (see Penglai).

Western Garden: This part is only half the size of the central part, and is also mainly dominated by water. The pond runs from north to south, and at the central part rises an islet. Although small, it is planned with meticulous care and precision. The buildings, though numerous, do not clutter; small mountains and ponds do not give a cramped impression.

Garden Design Elements with Description
Eastern Garden
Dragon Wall Facing the garden gate, this dragon wall marked the garden entry on the canal.
All Blue Pavilion A terrace with two wings built over a pond. It is named for a verse by Chu Guangxi, "Waterweeds in the pond look dark green". Also called the Angling Terrace.
Celestial Spring Tower An octagonal tower with flying eaves, built around a preexisting well called the celestial spring.
Fragrant Sorghum Hall A five bay hall open on four sides with hipped-gable roofline. The name comes from sorghum fields that once existed near the garden. The windows are decorated with boxwood carvings of scenes from Romance of the Western Chamber.
Looking Far Away Pavilion A square pavilion open on two sides, sited atop a hill in front of the Fragrant Sorghum Hall.
Orchid and Snow Hall A three bay hall internally divided by a lacquer screen engraved with a map of the garden. Orchid and snow are symbolic of ritual purity.
Pavilion of the Leaning against Rainbow An attached square pavilion with hipped gable roofline and flying eves built in front of the main entry to the central garden. This pavilion is the vantage point for a borrowed view of North Temple Pagoda.
Pavilion of Lotus A terrace open on two sides with a hipped gable roofline and a portico on all four sides. It overlooks a lotus pond and was named for the verse by Yang Wangli, "To the horizon green lotus leaves seem to extend infinitely; under the sun reddish lotus flowers go bright scarlet." A scholar stone is mounted in the middle.
Central Garden
Bamboo Hall Also called the Southern Hall, it is a three bay hall with a portico on four sides. The roofline is hipped-gable with flying eves. The hall is named after a nearby bamboo grove.
Distant Fragrance Hall The main hall of the central garden, it is three bays wide and open on four sides. It has with a hipped-gable roofline with flying eves, and a portico on all four sides. It was rebuilt during the Qing dynasty, on the site of Wang Xiancheng's Country Hall House. The hall is sited to capture the scent of Lotus blossoms on Surging Wave Pond, as well as frame views of the islands. The hall is named after a verse by the Neo-confucianist poet Zhou Dunyi, " Though growing out of the filthy mud, she remains unstained. Though bathed in clear water, she bears no sign of seduction." This verse describing the lotus flower, also alludes to noble character, thus lotus fragrance coming off the Surging Wave Pond is ideologically tied to Neo-confucianism.
Firmiana simplex and Bamboo Pavilion Named after a Chinese folk expression, "Where there are bamboo groves there are houses," and "With a Parasol tree (Firmiana simplex) in his yard, one is assured of a phoniex's coming and good fortune." It is a square pavilion with a hipped gable roofline and flying eves. Each of the four sides are walled with a large moongate in the wall creating a gaitian symbolism.
Flowering Crabapples in Spring Hall Named after the crabapple (Malus spectabilis) planted in the attached courtyard.
Flying Rainbow Bridge A covered bridge arched in three segments connected to a covered corridor on either end. It was designed to give the appearance of a rainbow shimmering when its reflection is stirred in the water. It is unique for being the only arched bridge in a Suzhou garden.
Fragrant Isle A landboat structure, named for the smell of the lotus blossoms in Surging Wave Pond
Gatehouse (Inner ) The interior part of a two gatehouse composed of two gates connected by a passage. This was the original gate to the garden.
Gatehouse (Outer ) The exterior part of a two gatehouse composed of two gates connected by a passage. This was the original gate to the garden.
Green Ripple Pavilion (綠漪亭) A square pavilion with hipped gable roofline and flying eveas. It is open and all sides and sited over the water, to enjoy the reflection of willows in the winter.
Hall of Elegance Also called the Pavilion of Exqusitiness, it is inspired by a verse by Su Shunqin, "Autumn drops in and tinges the dark woods red; moonlight pours down and grants the bamboo groves an exquisite look". It has a hipped gable roofline with flying eves.
Listening to the Sound of Rain Hall Named for the sound of rain on banana trees. It anchors an enclosed courtyard with rockery and pond.
Little Surging Wave Hall A three bay terrace hall with portico built on piers over the water to create the illusion of an unseen source feeding Surging Wave Pond, after which it is named. The name of the pond alludes to a quote by Mencius, "when the water is clean I wash my Imperial Ribbon, when the water is dirty I wash my muddy feet", itself an allusion to the correct behavior of a civil servant in a corrupt government.
Little Surging Wave Pavilion (松风水阁,小沧浪) A pavilion connected by covered corridor to Little Surging Wave Hall. It is enclosed on four sides as a winter retreat for viewing Flying Rainbow Bridge.
Loquat Pavilion Named for the surrounding Loquat (Eriobotrya japonica) grove. The overall composition of building and plants is one several mini-gardens.
Lotus Breeze Pavilion A hexagonal pavilion with flying eves, sited in the middle of the pond. It is named for a verse by Li Hongyi, "Green willow foliage connects twin bridges; gentle breeze sends in lotus scent from around".
Magnolia Hall Also called Blooming Brush Hall, which is an allusion to a story by Li Bai about a red flower blooming from the tip of his brush that became a symbol of creativity. It is a three bay hall with a walled courtyard attached to the front. It is named for the magnolia trees in the courtyard and functioned as Wen Zhengming's studio.
Mountain in View Pavilion(见山阁) Named for a verse by Tao Yuanming, "As I pick chrysanthemums on the eastern fence, my eyes fall leisurely on the southern mountain".
Orange Pavilion Also called the Pavilion of Awaiting Frost. It is sited atop an island.
Pavilion of Fragrant Snow and Azure Cloud Also called Snow Like Fragrant Prunus mume Pavilion, it is a square pavilion open on three sides. The inscription of this pavilion by Wang Ji, "The shrill of cicadas enhances the serenity of the woods, The twitter of birds lends tranquility to the hillsides." It is sited atop an island in the pond and along the main entry axis passing through Distant Fragrance Hall.
Peony suffruiticosa Pavilion Also called the Embroidered Silk Pavilion, it is a square pavilion open on three sides. It is sited on top of a yellowstone rockery and forms an ideal vantage point for viewing the islands.
Think Deep Aim High Hall a three bay hall with attached courtyard in front housing a collection of scholar stones. The name comes from the book of Yi Xun, "standing by deep valleys makes you think deep, and scaling great heights makes you aim high."
Think Deep Aim High Pavilion
True Nature Pavilion Named after Buddhist sutra of the same name, it is a three bay square attached pavilion with hipped gable roofline and flying eves.
Western Half Pavilion An attached squared pavilion sited in front of the main entry into the western garden. This entry in the form of a moongate is named Scenery of Exceptional Beauty.
West Garden
Bamboo Hat Pavilion Also called the Indocalamus Pavilion. A freestanding hexagonal pavilion with a round roofline. It is the sited at the vertex of the angle formed by the side walls of the "With Whom Shall I Sit?" Pavilion.
Floating Green Tower(浮閣)
Good for Both Families Pavilion Named after a verse by Bai Juyi, "The bright moon shines over the hermits farmstead; the green willow proclaims the approach of spring to both families". This verse was an allusion to the clever use of borrowed views from the central and western gardens. It is a two-story octagonal tower sited atop a rockery in an enclosed courtyard.
Hall of 36 Mandarin Ducks and 18 Camellias (卅六鴛鴦館和十八曼陀羅花館) The main hall of the western garden. It is a typical mandrian duck hall but with four attached pavilions at the corners in Shanghai garden style. This hall was used for Kunqu Opera performances.
Keep and Listen Hall (留聽閣) Named after a verse by Li Shangyin, "Autumn gloom doesn't clear up yet and fall frost gets delayed; withered lotus leaves are left in the pond to hear the patter of rain". It was designed as a vantage point to view lotus in the pond.
Pagoda Reflection Pavilion(塔影亭)
Tower of Reflection (倒影樓) A two-story tower with a ground floor dedicated to Wen Zhengming and Shen Zhou.
Wavy Waterside Corridor A covered corridor with attached pavilion used as a boat dock. It is named for the grade changes which give it the feel of floating on the waves.
"With Whom Shall I Sit?" Pavilion (誰同坐軒) Named after a verse by Su Shi, "With whom shall I sit? the bright moon, refreshing breeze and me". This verse is symbolic of the poet's desire to purify his soul. The pavilion is freestanding and fan shaped.
All Blue Pavilion A terrace with two wings built over a pond. it is named for a verse by Chu Guangxi, "Waterweeds in the pond look dark green". Also called the Angling Terrace.

== See also ==
- Chinese garden
- Suzhou
- World Heritage Sites in China

== Sources ==
- Clunas, Craig (1996). Fruitful Sites: Garden Culture in Ming Dynasty China (Envisioning Asia). Reaktion. ISBN 978-0948462887.
- Forsyth, Holly Kerr (2010). Gardens of Eden: Among the World's Most Beautiful Gardens. Melbourne UP. ISBN 978-0522857764.
- Liu, Dunzhen (1936). Suzhou gu dian yuan lin [Classic Gardens of Suzhou] (in Chinese).
- Ministry of Culture (2003). "Humble Administrator's Garden". Archived from the original on 3 March 2016.
- Qingxi, Lou (2011). Chinese gardens. CUP. ISBN 978-0521186612.
- Suzhou China (2009). "Humble Administrator's Garden". Archived from the original on 3 March 2016.
- Terebess LLC (24 June 2004). "The Humble Administrator's Garden".
- Yuan, Xuehan 袁学汉; Gong, Jianyi 龚建毅 (1999). 苏州古典园林 [The Classical Gardens of Suzhou 2004 isbn = 978-7214037633] (in Chinese). Jiangsu people's. ISBN 978-7214021748.
