= Li Jingye =

Chinese general and politician (636–684)

Li Jingye/Xu Jingye 李敬業/徐敬業

Duke of Ying 英國公
- In office 669–684
- Preceded by: Li Shiji

Personal details
- Born: 636
- Died: 684 (aged 47–48)
- Relations: Li Shiji (grandfather)
- Parent: Li Zhen 李震

Li Jingye (Chinese: 李敬業; 636 – December 29, 684), also known as Xu Jingye (徐敬業), was a Chinese general and politician who was a grandson of the Tang dynasty general Li Shiji who, after Emperor Gaozong's powerful wife Empress Wu (later known as Wu Zetian) had seized personally all power after Emperor Gaozong's death, rose in rebellion against her, but who was quickly defeated and killed in flight.

== Background ==
It is not known when Li Jingye was born. He was probably the oldest son of Li Shiji's oldest son Li Zhen (李震), who had predeceased Li Shiji (who then had changed his name to Li Ji to observe naming taboo for Emperor Taizong). After Li Ji's death in 669 during the reign of Emperor Taizong's son Emperor Gaozong, Li Jingye, as Li Ji's oldest grandson, inherited Li Ji's title as the Duke of Ying.

== Rebellion against Empress Dowager Wu ==
=== Preparation ===
Emperor Gaozong died in 683 and was succeeded by his son Li Zhe (as Emperor Zhongzong), but actual and superior power was in the hands of Emperor Gaozong's powerful wife Empress Wu (later known as Wu Zetian), as empress dowager. In spring 684, after Emperor Zhongzong showed signs of independence, she deposed him and reduced him to the title of Prince of Luling, replacing him with his brother Li Dan the Prince of Yu (as Emperor Ruizong). Thereafter, she wielded power even more tightly, and she, not Emperor Ruizong, was the one that officials reported to, with Emperor Ruizong not even nominally approving official actions.

Meanwhile, it was said that members of the Li imperial clan were all fearful of the developments, and the people were distressed at Emperor Zhongzong's removal. Around this time, Li Jingye and a number of people who he had known happened to be demoted based on various accusations not recorded in historical accounts:

- Li Jingye was demoted from being the prefect of Mei Prefecture (眉州, roughly modern Meishan, Sichuan) to be the military advisor to the prefect of Liu Prefecture (柳州, roughly modern Liuzhou, Guangxi).
- Li Jingye's brother Li Jingyou (李敬猷) was removed from his post as magistrate of Zhouzhi County (盩厔, in modern Xi'an, Shaanxi).
- Tang Zhiqi (唐之奇) was demoted from being supervising imperial attendant (給事中, Jishizhong) to be the magistrate of Guacang County (栝蒼, in modern Lishui, Zhejiang)
- Luo Binwang was demoted from being a secretary at the county government of Chang'an County (one of the two counties making up the capital Chang'an) to be the secretary general of Linhai County
- Du Qiuren (杜求仁), a nephew of the deceased chancellor Du Zhenglun, was demoted from being an auditor under the head of the household at the palace of the crown prince to be the magistrate of Yi County (黟縣, in modern Huangshan, Anhui)
- Wei Siwen (魏思溫), a one-time assistant imperial censor, had been demoted to be the sheriff of Zhouzhi County, and now was again demoted (although historical accounts do not state where he was demoted again)

These people all met in Yang Prefecture (揚州, roughly modern Yangzhou, Jiangsu). Displeased over their demotions, they planned to start a rebellion against Empress Dowager Wu, declaring as their goal Emperor Zhongzong's restoration.

Wei, as the group's strategist, had their cohort Xue Zhongzhang (薛仲璋), who was then an assistant imperial censor, request an assignment to Yang Prefecture to investigate matters there. Another cohort, Wei Chao (韋超), made a public accusation against the military advisor to the prefect of Yang Prefecture, Chen Jingzhi (陳敬之) of plotting treason, and Xue used this as an excuse to arrest Chen. Several days later, Li Jingye arrived by government courier service and claimed that he had been made the new military advisor to the prefect of Yang Prefecture and that he had been commissioned by Empress Dowager Wu to prepare a military action against the tribal chief Feng Ziyou (馮子猷). He thereafter opened up the military depot and had his assistant Li Zongchen (李宗臣) to conscript prisoners and workers at the imperial mint at Yang Prefecture into service. He also executed Chen and another official, Su Chuxing (蘇處行). The other officials did not dare to oppose him, and he took control of Yang Prefecture.

=== Launch ===
Li Jingye mobilized the troops from Yang Prefecture and declared the restoration of Emperor Zhongzong's Sisheng era name, to show that he intended to restore Emperor Zhongzong. He declared himself the Great General for Restoration (匡復府上將, Kuangfu Fu Shangjiang). He quickly gathered over 100,000 men within 10 days. He also had Luo Binwang draft a declaration against Empress Dowager Wu that was distributed to other prefecture, that stated:

The wrongfully ruling Lady Wu has a disagreeable temper and a dishonorable ancestry. When she was serving as one of the ladies in Emperor Taizong's palace, she had once taken the opportunity, while Emperor Taizong was changing, to consummate a relationship with him. Later, her lack of virtue polluted the spring palace [(i.e., the palace of then-crown prince Emperor Gaozong)]. She secretly hid the fact that she had sexual relations with Emperor Taizong to treacherously receive the emperor's love. Once she got in the palace, she would not yield even in her brows; she falsely implicated others, and she used her fox-like charms to delude the emperor. She finally was able to put on an empress' clothes and put our emperor in position of committing incest. She has a heart similar to a snake and a lizard, and a disposition similar to a wolf. She is close to insidious individuals and murders the faithful and the good. She killed her sister, slaughtered her brothers, murdered her emperor, and poisoned her mother. Both gods and men hate her, and heaven and earth cannot allow her to exist. She continues to harbor a treasonous heart, seeking to steal the symbols of sovereignty. She put the emperor's beloved son under house arrest in another palace, while giving the relatives of thieves important responsibilities. Alas! There is no Huo Guang present, and the Marquess of Zhuxu has already been wiped out. When a swallow poked at an imperial prince, Han's rule was known to be at an end; when the dragons mated before the emperor, Xia's court was known to be failing.

Jingye is an old subject of imperial Tang, and a progeny of duke and marquess. He had seen the accomplishment of past emperors, and received great grace from this dynasty. The sadness of Count Wei of Song was not without cause; were Yuan Junshan's tears to be for nought? Therefore, he gathered his anger and resolved to secure the empire. As the people of the realm are disappointed, and the state hopes for changes, he raises his flag of righteousness to clear away the evil.

We will connect with the Yue peoples to the south and conscript from the Yellow River region to the north. The iron-like horses will be gathered, and the jade-like wagon axles will connect with each other. The red rice from Hailing [(海陵, in modern Taizhou, Jiangsu)] will fill the storage, and as the yellow flag rises from the banks of the Yangtze, how distant can the Restoration be? As the sounds of the horses start, so does the north wind; and as the swords are drawn, the fighting sounds to the south cease. Even if we drone quietly the mountains will crumble, and if we yell out, the winds and clouds will change. As we use these to attack the enemy, what enemy will not be destroyed? As we seek to accomplish great things with these, what accomplishment is out of reach?

You, dukes, may be living in Han lands [(i.e., in the central region of the state)]; or you may be relations of the Zhou [(i.e., related to the imperial clan)]; or you may have been entrusted by word; or you may be asked to look after the imperial house. Your words are still ringing in your ears, so how can you forget your faithfulness? The soil on the new imperial tomb is not yet dry, and to whom can the two-meter-tall orphan be entrusted? If you can turn disaster into fortune, put things in the past, accomplish the Restoration together, and not forget about the will of the deceased emperor, your titles and rewards will be as permanent as the mountains and the rivers. If you hold your cities out against us and hesitate on the wrong path, disregarding the signs of the future, you will surely be executed. Look around the realm. Who is its actual ruler?

Li Jingye also found a person who was similar in appearance to Emperor Zhongzong's older brother Li Xian—who had previously been crown prince but who had been deposed in 680 and whom Empress Dowager Wu had forced to commit suicide earlier in 684—and claimed that Li Xian was still alive and approved of the rebellion.

Meanwhile, Wei Siwen suggested to Li Jingye that he head toward Luoyang quickly to show that his intent was to destroy Empress Dowager Wu's regime quickly. however, Xue Zhongzhang advocated attacking Chang (常州, roughly modern Changzhou, Jiangsu) and Run (潤州, roughly modern Zhenjiang, Jiangsu) Prefectures first, and then seizing Jinling, to use the Yangtze River as a natural defense, and despite Wei's pleas that doing so would show that Li Jingye was already looking for a place to hide after defeat and would discourage people from joining the rebellion, Li Jingye accepted Xue's suggestion and headed south to attack Run Prefecture. He quickly captured it—despite defensive efforts by his uncle Li Siwen (李思文), who was then its prefect. (After capturing Li Siwen, he stated to Li Siwen, "Uncle, you are serving as a cohort of the Wus, and you should change your family name to Wu." After Li Jingye's eventual defeat, Empress Dowager Wu did, as a sign of her favor, change Li Siwen's family name to Wu, but eventually exiled him.)

Upon hearing of Li Jingye's rebellion, Empress Dowager Wu commissioned the general Li Xiaoyi (李孝逸), assisted by the generals Li Zhishi (李知十) and Ma Jingchen (馬敬臣), to attack Li Jingye. She also dug up the graves of Li Jingye's grandfather Li Ji and father Li Zhen, posthumously stripped them of their titles, and ordered that the clan have their family name changed from Li back to Li Ji's original family name of Xu. (Li Ji had been granted the imperial family name of Li after submitting to Tang's founder Emperor Gaozu in 619.)

=== Defeat and death ===
Meanwhile, once Li Jingye heard that Li Xiaoyi was set to arrive, he returned from Run Prefecture to Yang Prefecture, and set his camp at Xia'a (下阿, at modern Tianchang), Gaoyou to prepare to defend against Li Xiaoyi's attack, while sending Li Jingyou to attack Huaiyin (淮陰, in modern Huai'an, Jiangsu) and Wei Chao and Yuchi Zhao (尉遲昭) to defend Mount Duliang (都梁山, in modern Huai'an as well). As Li Xiaoyi arrived, his officer Lei Renzhi (雷仁智) attacked but initially failed against the resistance forces, and this caused Li Xiaoyi to hesitate and stop his advance. He continued his advance only after his subordinate Wei Yuanzhong warned him that continuing to halt will cause the perception that the rebellion was a more serious threat than it was—and pointed out that Empress Dowager Wu might send another general to replace him. Soon, Ma Jingchen was able to kill Yuchi in battle. (Empress Dowager Wu, indeed, commissioned another general, Heichi Changzhi, against Li Jingye, although Li Jingye would be defeated before Heichi could arrive.)

Meanwhile, Li Xiaoyi, under the suggestions of Wei Yuanzhong and Xue Kegou (薛克構), decided to attack both Wei Chao and Li Jingyou first, to shake the confidence of the resistance forces. He was successful, and both Wei Chao and Li Jingyou fled. He then attacked Li Jingye's main forces and was initially unsuccessful—with his subordinate Su Xiaoxiang (蘇孝祥) dying in battle in the initial attack. Several subsequent attacks by Li Xiaoyi were also unsuccessful. However, after the resistance forces had been worn out, Li Xiaoyi, at the suggestion of Liu Zhirou (劉知柔), used favorable wind conditions set fire to the surrounding grass toward Li Jingye's forces and then attacked along with the fire. Li Jingye's forces were defeated; 7,000 were killed in battle, while many died by drowning while fleeing. Li Jingye and his close associates fled back to Jiangdu (江都, Yang Prefecture's capital) and took their families south to Run Prefecture, planning to head out to sea and then to the Korean Peninsula. Li Xiaoyi quickly took Jiangdu and sent forces to chase after Li Jingye. As Li Jingye's party fled to Hailing and met headwind, his subordinate Wang Naxiang (王那相) changed his mind about fleeing and instead killed Li Jingye, Li Jingyou, and Luo Binwang, surrendering to governmental forces with their heads. Tang Zhiqi and Wei Siwen were captured and beheaded.

== Notes and references ==
- Old Book of Tang, vol. 67.
- New Book of Tang, vol. 93.
- Zizhi Tongjian, vols. 201, 203.
