= Wang Wan =

Wang Wan (simplified Chinese: 王湾; traditional Chinese: 王灣; pinyin: Wáng Wān, 693–751), was a Tang dynasty Chinese poet. Ten of his poems are preserved, and the most famous poem among those is "A Mooring Under North Fort Hill" (次北固山下). Chinese prime minister, Wen Jiabao, quoted the poem in the lecture of Cambridge University in England.

== Poetry ==
Wang Wan was attracted by mountains and lakes in Jiangnan and influenced by the delicate style of poetry at that time. So he wrote some works to chant the beautiful mountains and lakes.

=== A Mooring Under North Fort Hill ===
This poem was praised highly by the dignitary and became the model of many scholars to learn from. The spectacles this poem expressed also made deep impression on the Tang poetry. We can also see the poem in the Chinese textbook of grade seven. What's more, Chinese prime minister, Wen Jiabao, quoted the poem in the lecture of Cambridge University.
