= Wang Bo (poet) =

Tang dynasty Chinese poet

- 王勃
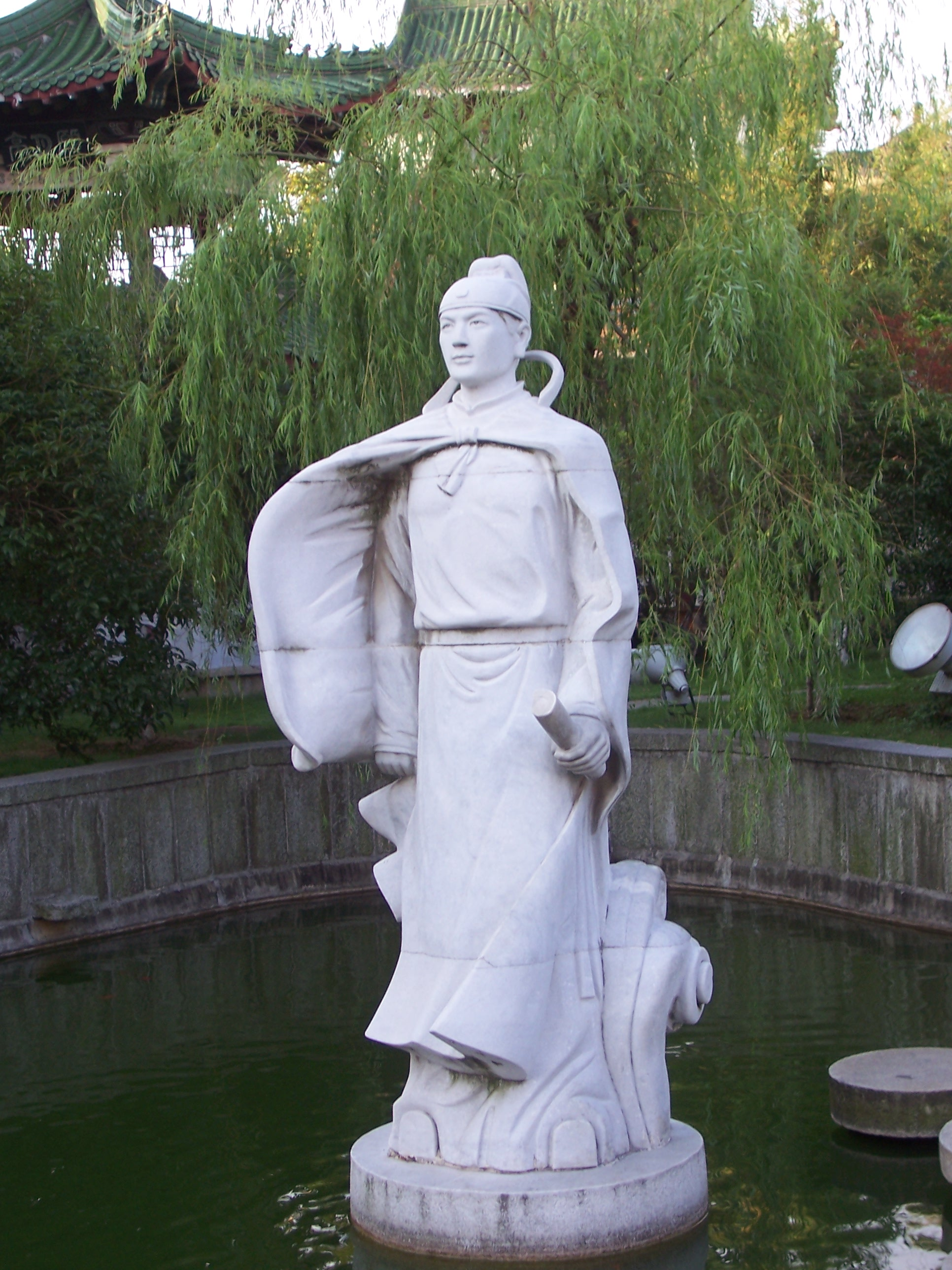
- Born: 650
- Died: 676 (aged 25–26); South China Sea
- Writing career
- Movement: Tang poetry

Chinese name
- Chinese: 王勃
Transcriptions
Standard Mandarin
- Hanyu Pinyin: Wáng Bó
- Wade–Giles: Wang^{2} Po^{2}
- IPA: [wǎŋ pwǒ]
Yue: Cantonese
- Yale Romanization: Wòhng Buht
- Jyutping: Wong^{4} But^{6}
- IPA: [wɔŋ˩ put̚˨]
Middle Chinese
- Middle Chinese: Jwang Bwət

Japanese name
- Kanji: 王勃
- Hiragana: おう ぼつ
Transcriptions
- Romanization: Ō Botsu

Wang Bo (Chinese: 王勃; Wade–Giles: Wang Po; 650–676), courtesy name Zi'an (子安), was a Chinese poet during the Tang dynasty, traditionally grouped together with Luo Binwang, Lu Zhaolin, and Yang Jiong as the Four Paragons of the Early Tang. He died at the age of 26, possibly from drowning, while going back from the Tang-ruled Jiaozhi after meeting his father.

He opposed the spread of the Gong Ti Style (宫体诗风) of the Sui dynasty, and advocated a style rich in emotions. He was most well-known for his parallel prose work Tengwang Ge Xu, which is included in the Chinese middle school curriculum.

== Life ==
Wang Bo was born in A.D 650 into a family with high literary status. His grandfather was the Sui dynasty Confucian philosopher Wang Tong. His father was named Wang Fuzhi (王福畤). According to the Old Book of Tang, Wang Bo could write poems when he was six years old; he finished reading the Classics when he was ten. Beginning his career under Prince Pei (Prince Zhanghuai), he wrote a call-to-arms (檄) in jest which was criticized by the emperor (Emperor Gaozong of Tang). After that, he killed a servant, ending his political career. This incident also implicated his father, who was banished to Jiaozhi. One account of Wang's death was that at age 26, he drowned on an ocean journey in search of his father.

== Themes and Values ==
=== Self-display ===
While Wang Bo had a negative attitude toward Shangguan Style, he advocated for the true reflection of the poet found within auxiliary literature works. This literary goal was inspired by Sima Qian's "Shitaigong Zixu" (Self-preface of the Grand Scribe [史太公自序]), which is autobiographical. In his poem "Fu" (赋), written after Bo's life with Prince Pei during his journey in Shu (蜀), we can see self-display, which is "Youmiaoshan Xu" (游庙山序). This is the first time Wang Bo recorded major conflict within his experience as an explorer of the natural and the objective world, as well as an aspiring Daoist.

As the ideal he possessed that "poetry expresses one's mind" (诗言志) was gradually established in early Tang literary world, Wang Bo's other two prefaces, "Preface for a Banquet Held at a Pavilion in the North of Mianzhou, Attended by a Host of Gentlemen" (Mianzhou beiting qungong yan xu [绵州北亭羣公宴序]) and "Preface for Collected Poems Composed When Several Gentlemen Visited Me on a Summer Day" (Xiari zhugong jian xunfang shixu [夏日诸公见寻访诗序]), as well as one of his most famous works, "Tengwangge Xu", express his disappointment in political matters, but still bear his strong passion to show fealty to his country.

"Tengwangge Xu" was written about the journey of finding his father, through which Bo arrived at Hongzhou (洪州), experienced great hardships due to political turmoil, killed a servant, and received criticism in his articles. Keeping true to his nature, he wrote about the local autumn landscape in "Tengwangge" in an attempt to express his emotion. He described himself as an abject man with rough experience in political life, comparing himself with Sima Xiangru (司马相如) in order to reflect his strong wish to contribute to his country. This is clear evidence of his "self-display".

As one of the "Four Paragons of the Early Tang", Bo's ideology that "poetry expresses one's mind" contributed immensely not only to Early Tang poetic style at large, but also his important status in the Tang literary world.

=== Change at Peiwang ===
During Wang Bo's short life, he experienced political frustration during his time at Peiwang Fu (沛王府). As a result, the period considerably altered Bo's literature work, tying back societally driven essays with poems of frenzied emotion.

Wang Bo wrote "Tao Doji Xi" (讨斗鸡檄) with a jocular attitude, boldly praising Peiwang's local government and instrumental in his win when showcased at a court-sponsored competition; the Emperor wrote off this victory, citing his status as a "Wai Cai" (a talented contributor with a strange ideology) while juxtaposing it with his status as a "Boshi" (a noble's advisor and personal literary tutor). He was expelled forcefully from Peiwang Fu.

The final snarl in Wang Bo's political life was his dispatching of Cao Da (曹达), a noble's servant, marking him for the death penalty. Bo was released from the sentence, yet he lost his place among his former governmental peers.

In grim memory of the prior accidents that had disfavored him, Wang Bo altered his brash article style. As his literary work "self-displayed" to a greater and greater extent, past the events of his stint in Pei, he projected an increasingly negative atmosphere, and reflected his sad emotion and yearning to return to political matters in order to advance a peaceful and prosperous nation.

== Influence and achievements ==
Pei Xingjian (裴行俭), who was an official Attendant Gentleman of the Ministry of Personnel (吏部). He was nominated, along with Yang Jiong (杨炯), Lu Zhaolin (卢照邻), and Luo Binwang (骆宾王) as one-fourth of the "Four Paragons of the Early Tang" (初唐四杰).

As mentioned before, Wang Bo opposed Gongti Style (宫体诗风), which is a school of literature, seeking for the perfect beauty of world, but ignoring the content and sense. Wang Bo had established "poetry express one's mind" and carry it forward, which provided a new style for the Tang Literary world. Wang Bo's poems, for example, "Farewell to Prefect Du" (Song DuShaofu Zhi Ren Shuzhou送杜少府之任蜀州) was selected in "300 poems of Tang". His article, "Tengwangge Xu" (滕王阁序) has been select in Chinese high-school textbook.

Also, Wang Bo had a high achievement in Tang Fu (赋). In early and High Tang literature history, an interesting literary phenomena is "wrote Shi in Fu style" (以赋为诗). So many poets and writer are creating Fu. Wang Bo's famous work, such as Chunsi Fu (春思赋) and Cailian Fu (采莲赋), both have a high status in the literary world. Wang Bo and "Four Paragons" use their experiment of trying and exploring the new genre. Their experiments made huge contributions to the thriving literature world of the Tang dynasty.

== Critical and Comments ==
There are both positive and negative comments about Wang Bo and his literary works. Positive comments think he is talented and made a huge contribution to the literature world, especially poems and "Fu". Negative comments outline Wang Bo's mistake on killing Cao Da, which was mentioned before, they think he is "frivolous and shallow."

=== Positive ===
High Tang Poet Du Fu(杜甫) had been writing poems criticizing Wang Bo and Four Paragons of Early Tang" with a positive attitude. There is an example:

- Yang, Wang, Lu, and Luo—the style of those times—

Frivolous and shallow were their compositions, disdain never ceased.

All of you—your persons and names have both perished. Uninterrupted is the current of the river for a myriad ages.

Duan Chengshi(段成式) also record Wang Bo's amazing talent in writing. He outlined a short story by Wang Bo, which, when he was writing the article, never interrupted.

- Every time Wang Bo composed a stele inscription or panegyric, he first ground several liters of ink and laid him down with a blanket covering him up to his face. All of a sudden, he got up and wrote it in a single stroke, without correcting and blotting it. People of his time called it "belly draft."

=== Negative ===
But there are still some negative comments from Wang Bo and his article, in Du Fu's poem as mentioned before, he states that the Four paragons of Early Tang's work are "frivolous and shallow" (轻薄). This criticism was caused by Wang Bo killing a servant called Cao Da. That is a mistake that cannot really be accepted by the government. In Jiu Tangshu (旧唐书), Wang Bo's biograph, comments was outlined as "bombastic, impetuous, shallow, and flaunting" (浮躁浅露). Wen Yiduo (闻一多), a Chinese famous scholar had explained the "frivolous and shallow" of Wang Bo and Four paragons of Early Tang like that: "Because their behavior and conduct were romantic, they suffered from all the mockery and denunciation of others."

== Translations ==
Wang Bo's most famous poem, "Farewell to Prefect Du" (Song DuShaofu Zhi Ren Shuzhou送杜少府之任蜀州) was selected in "300 Tang Poems" for Chinese Children's enlightenment. Now, "300 Tang Poems" has been translated into English by several translators, making those poems known throughout the world.
