= Zhang Ruoxu =

Tang Chinese poet

Zhang Ruoxu (Chinese: 張若虛; Wade–Giles: Chang Jo-hsü; ca. 660 – ca. 720) was a Chinese poet of the early Tang dynasty from Yangzhou in modern Jiangsu province. He is best known for "Spring River in the Flower Moon Night" (Chun Jiang Hua Yue Ye, 春江花月夜), one of the most distinctive and influential Tang poems, which has inspired numerous later artworks.

== Life ==
Zhang Ruoxu was a native of Yangzhou in modern Jiangsu province, and served as a minor military officer in Yanzhou in modern Shandong. Little is known about his life today. He is traditionally grouped with He Zhizhang, Zhang Xu, and Bao Rong as the Four Poets of Central Wu (吳中四士), the Lower Yangtze region.

== Poetry ==
Only two of Zhang Ruoxu's poems are extant, but one of them, "Spring River in the Flower Moon Night" (Chun Jiang Hua Yue Ye, 春江花月夜), has long been well known and considered an extraordinary work. The poem can be divided into nine quatrains and three sections. The first section describes the scenery of the moonlit Yangtze River in spring. The second and third lament the ephemerality of life, as well as the sorrow of travellers and the loved ones they leave behind. The poem marks a stylistic break from the poetry of the preceding Six Dynasties, and anticipates the content and style of High Tang poetry.

== Legacy ==
A distinctive poem of the Tang dynasty, "Spring River in the Flower Moon Night" is included in virtually all historical surveys of Tang poetry. The influential 20th-century poet Wen Yiduo was especially enthusiastic in his praise, calling it "the poem of all poems, the summit of all summits."

Zhang Ruoxu's poem has inspired numerous later artworks. The composer Peng Xiuwen created a piece of orchestral music with the same name, which has since entered the classical repertoire for the traditional Chinese instrument guzheng. During the Lantern Festival of 2013, calligrapher Wang Dongling (王冬龄) gave a live calligraphy performance at the Hong Kong Museum of Art, creating a 6 metres (20 ft) high by 11 metres (36 ft) wide work of Spring River in the Flower Moon Night. It was the largest work of calligraphy made in Hong Kong, and has been donated to the art museum.

== Bibliography ==
- Lin, Shuen-fu; Owen, Stephen (2014). The Vitality of the Lyric Voice: Shih Poetry from the Late Han to the T'ang. Princeton University Press. ISBN 978-1-4008-5838-5.
- Ma, Xiaodong (2005). Fengsao Guodu 风骚国度. Foreign Language Teaching and Research Press. ISBN 978-7-5600-4115-5.
- Nienhauser, William H. (1986). The Indiana Companion to Traditional Chinese Literature. Indiana University Press. ISBN 0-253-32983-3.
- Luo, Yuming (2011). A Concise History of Chinese Literature. BRILL. ISBN 978-90-04-20366-2.
- Gushi Guanzhi 古詩觀止 (in Chinese). Taiwan Shufang Publishing Company. 1997. ISBN 978-986-7939-89-0.

== Usage in Music ==
- Free HD Video Recording of Variations on "Spring River in the Flower Moon Night" from American Solo Harpist Jieyin Wu
