= Yang Jiong =

Tang dynasty Chinese poet

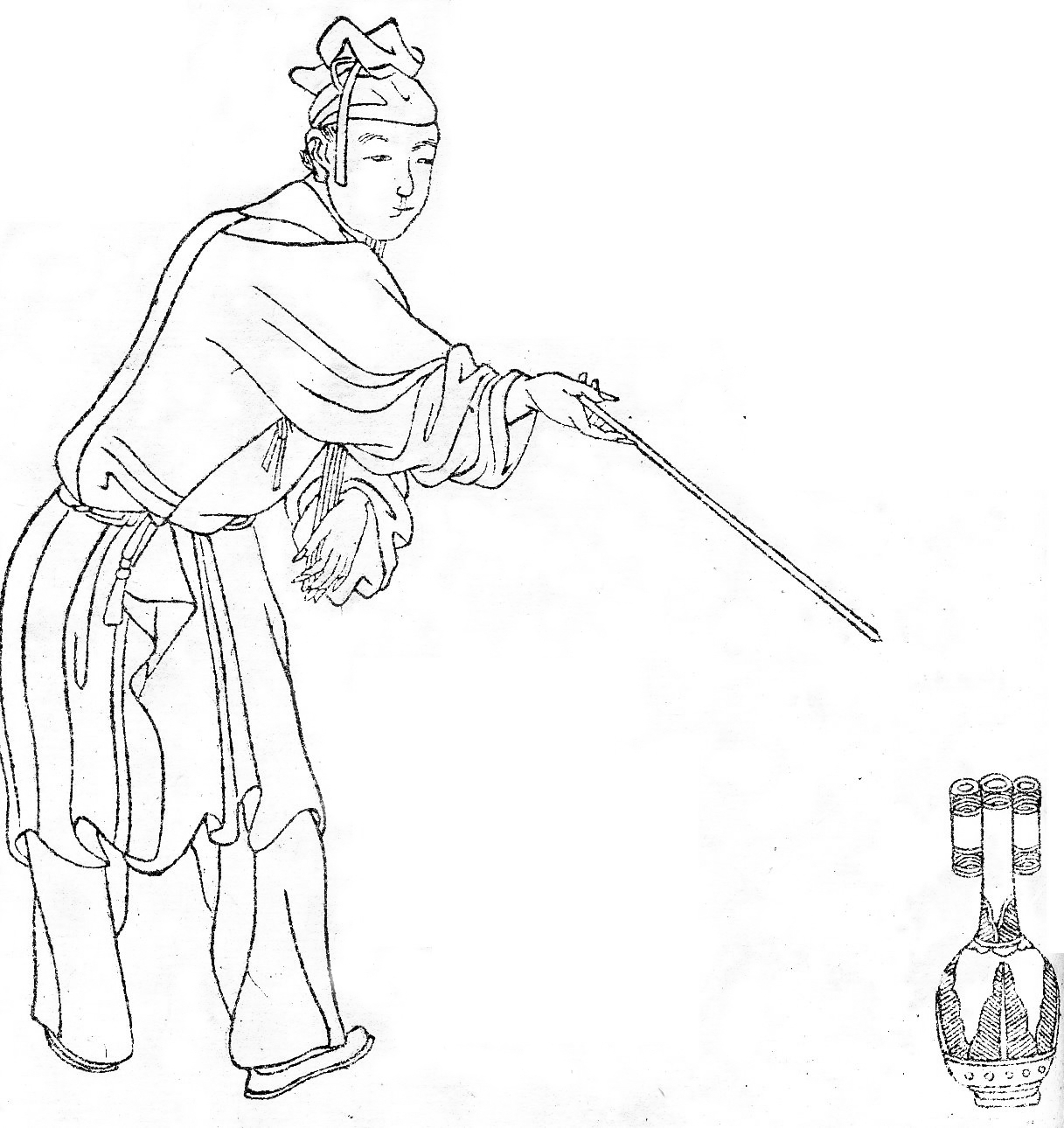
A sketch of Yang Jiong, by Shangguan Zhou (1743)

Yang Jiong (Chinese: 楊炯; Wade–Giles: Yang Chiung; (650–695?) was a Tang dynasty Chinese poet, traditionally grouped together with Luo Binwang, Lu Zhaolin, and Wang Bo as the Four Paragons of the Early Tang. Known for his eight extant fu (rhapsody) poems, he also wrote an influential preface to the collected works of Wang Bo, in which he criticized the excessive formality of the court poetry of the preceding generation, and lauded the classical style of Wang Bo and Lu Zhaolin.

== Life ==
Yang Jiong was born in Huayin in today's Shaanxi province. A child prodigy, Yang Jiong passed the special civil service examination for boys and was awarded with an official appointment to the prestigious Hongwen College in 659, when he was only nine years old. Unlike the other three "paragons", he spent most of his life serving at the imperial court in the capital Chang'an. He later served as the magistrate of Yingchuan County, and became commonly known as Yang Yingchuan (楊盈川). He died under unremarkable circumstances while in office, the only one of the "Four Paragons" to do so.

== Works ==
The imperial bibliographies of the Old Book of Tang and the New Book of Tang both recorded 30 juan (volumes) of Yang Jiong's collected works. However, the Chongwen Catalog of the Northern Song dynasty recorded 20 juan.

Yang Jiong's shi poems are not exceptional, but he is best known for his eight extant fu poems, most prominently "The Enveloping Sky", "The Old Man Star", and "Ullambana". His fu are described as "rich confections of scholarly lore and wordplay", some of which provide insight into the astral beliefs of the Tang dynasty.

Yang Jiong also wrote the preface for the collected works of Wang Bo, published after Wang's premature death. Yang criticized the "aberrant style" of the preceding generation of poetry, which became widely accepted by traditional scholars. In contrast, he lauded Wang Bo's classical style and praised Lu Zhaolin for checking the excessive formality of the court poetry.

== Bibliography ==
- Chang, Kang-i Sun; Owen, Stephen (2010). The Cambridge History of Chinese Literature. Cambridge University Press. ISBN 978-0-521-85558-7.
- Mair, Victor H. (2013). The Columbia History of Chinese Literature. Columbia University Press. ISBN 978-0-231-52851-1.
- Wang Yonghao; Luo Yuming, eds. (1999). 中国诗学 [Study of Chinese Poetry]. Oriental Publishing Center. ISBN 9787806273890.
