= Bao Rong =

Tang dynasty Chinese poet

Bao Rong (Chinese: 包融; Wade–Giles: Pao Jung; fl. early 8th century) was a Chinese poet of the Tang dynasty. He was a native of Yanling (modern Danyang, Jiangsu province). He is traditionally grouped with He Zhizhang, Zhang Xu, and Zhang Ruoxu as the Four Poets of Central Wu (吳中四士), the Lower Yangtze region. He served as a minor official in the Ministry of Justice of the Tang government, and was a close friend of the poet Meng Haoran. Bao Rong's two sons Bao He (包何) and Bao Ji (包佶) were also accomplished poets. The trio is collectively called the "Three Baos".

The Complete Tang Poems includes eight of his poems. His biography is included in the Yuan dynasty work Biographies of Tang Talents (唐才子传) by Xin Wenfang (辛文房).

== Bibliography ==
- Gushi Guanzhi 古詩觀止 (in Chinese). Taiwan Shufang Publishing Company. 1997. ISBN 978-986-7939-89-0.
- Xin, Wenfang (1997). 唐才子传 [Biographies of Tang Talents] (in Chinese). Taiwan Shufang Publishing Company. ISBN 978-957-8499-41-6.
