= Lu Zhaolin =

Tang dynasty Chinese poet

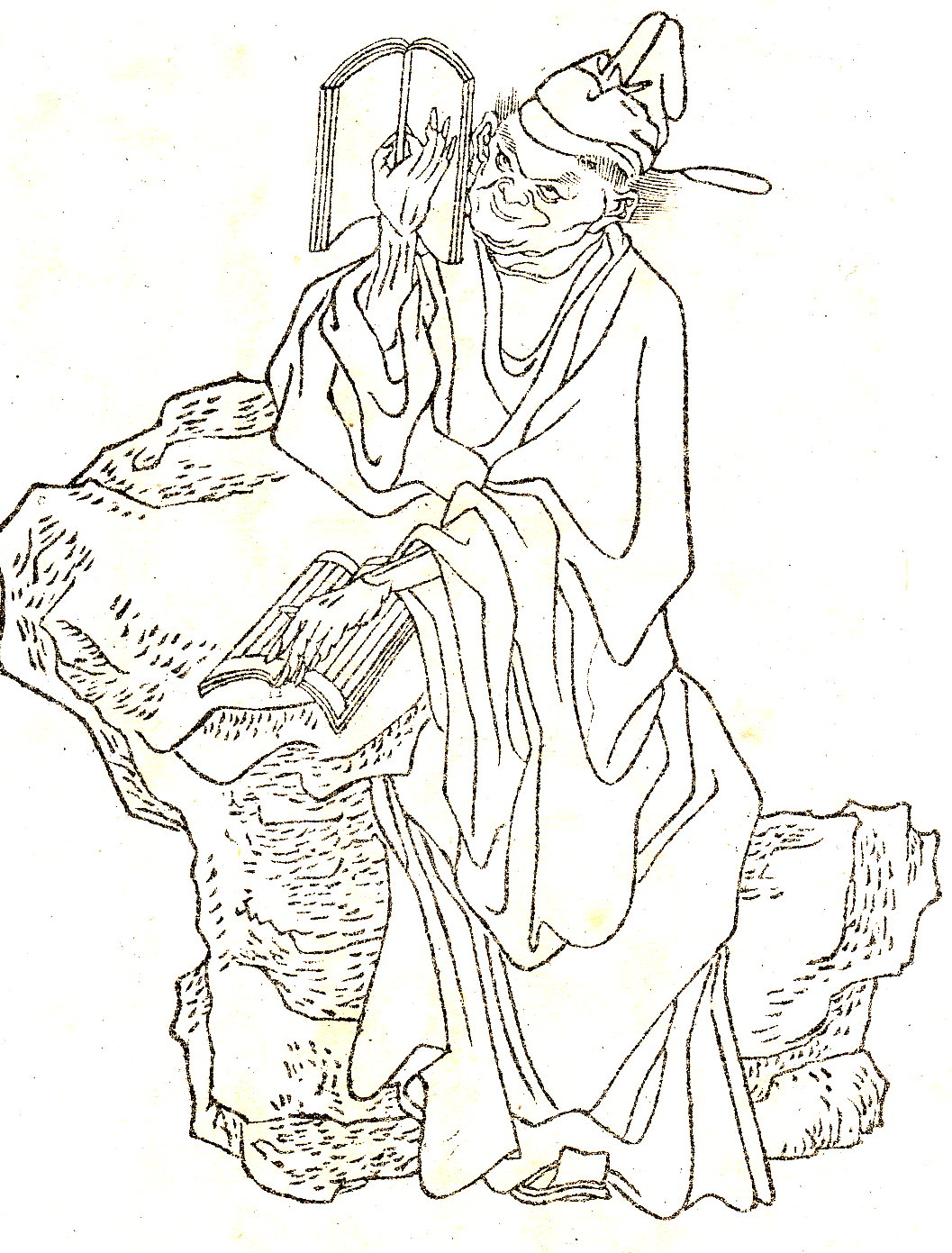
A sketch of Lu Zhaolin by Shangguan Zhou (1743)

Lu Zhaolin (Chinese: 盧照鄰; Wade–Giles: Lu Chao-lin; ca. 634 – ca. 684 or 686), courtesy name Shengzhi, was a Tang dynasty Chinese poet, traditionally grouped together with Luo Binwang, Wang Bo, and Yang Jiong as the Four Paragons of the Early Tang.

== Biography ==
Lu Zhaolin was born in Fanyang (near present-day Beijing). He studied under Cao Xian (曹憲; fl. 605–649), the master of Wen Xuan studies, and Wang Yifang (王義方; 615–669), a famous scholar of the Chinese classics. He worked in the archive of Prince Li Yuanyu (died 665), the seventeenth son of the founding Emperor Gaozu of the Tang dynasty. Lu was known for his erudition, and was said to have exhaustively studied the large collection of books in the prince's library. In 666, he was a member of the entourage of Emperor Gaozong on the imperial pilgrimage to Mount Tai.

Soon afterwards, Lu was appointed the county defender of Xindu in Shu province (modern Sichuan). He later suffered a debilitating disease, probably rheumatoid arthritis, which eventually crippled him. The disability forced him to resign from his post, and he became a disciple of the renowned doctor and alchemist Sun Simiao, living on Mount Taibai and in the capital Chang'an. He adopted the alternative name (hao) of Youyouzi (幽憂子), or "Master of Shrouded Sorrow". He committed suicide by drowning himself in the Ying River circa 684 or 686, after years of suffering.

== Poetry ==
Like the other three "paragons" of the early Tang, Lu Zhaolin was capable of composing the highly mannered poetry that was fashionable in the Tang court. However, his work outside the court allowed him significant freedom in his style. Lu was best known for his qilü, or ballads of seven-character lines, such as "Chang'an: Ancient Theme", but his most remarkable works are poems expressing his personal suffering, such as "Five Sorrows" and "Resolving Sickness", which were written in the style of Li Sao of the Songs of Chu. Lu was the only medieval poet to successfully revive the sao style of the ancient poet Qu Yuan; just like Qu Yuan, he chose to end his tragic life by drowning himself.

== Bibliography ==
- Chang, Kang-i Sun; Owen, Stephen (2010). The Cambridge History of Chinese Literature. Cambridge University Press. ISBN 978-0-521-85558-7.
- Mair, Victor H. (2013). The Columbia History of Chinese Literature. Columbia University Press. ISBN 978-0-231-52851-1.
- Nienhauser, William H. (1986). The Indiana Companion to Traditional Chinese Literature. Indiana University Press. ISBN 0-253-32983-3.
