= Luo Binwang =

Chinese poet of the Tang dynasty

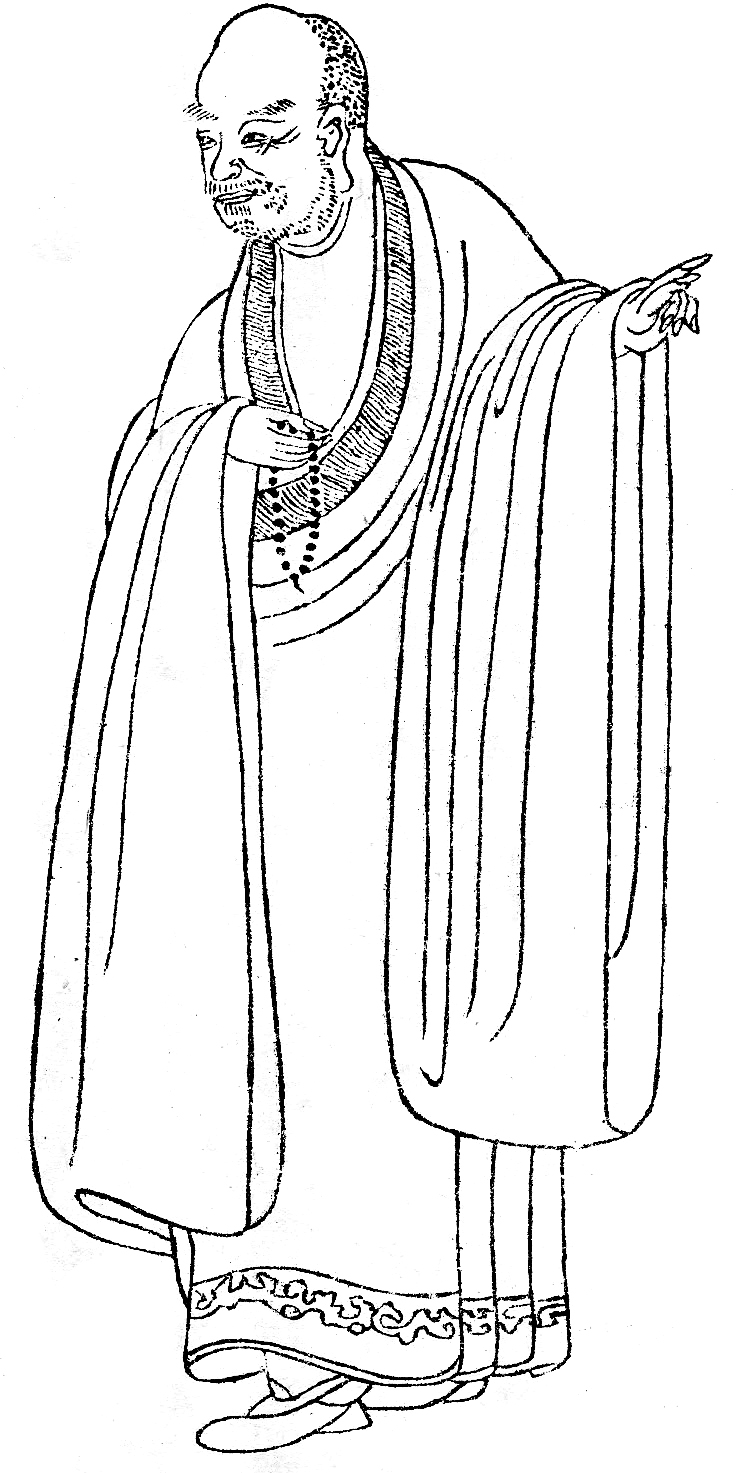
Image depicting Luo Binwang

Luo Binwang (simplified Chinese: 骆宾王; traditional Chinese: 駱賓王; pinyin: Luò Bīnwáng; Wade–Giles: Lo Pin-wang, ca. 619–684?), courtesy name Guanguang (觀光), was a Chinese poet of the Tang dynasty. His family was from Wuzhou, modern Yiwu, Zhejiang, but he was raised in Shandong. Along with Lu Zhaolin, Wang Bo and Yang Jiong, Luo is listed as one of the Four Paragons of the Early Tang, the most outstanding poets of their time.

== Early career ==
It was said that Luo Binwang could recite poetry when he was six years old. In adulthood, after a period serving on the staff of Li Yuanqing (李元慶) Prince of Dao, an uncle of then-ruling Emperor Gaozong, Luo worked in the central government in Chang'an from 665. In 670, he was exiled to Xinjiang, after which he travelled to Yunnan with the army. He later served on staff of the prominent general Pei Xingjian (裴行儉) while Pei was serving as the commandant at Tao Prefecture (洮州, roughly modern Haidong Prefecture, Qinghai), and was in charge of the military correspondence, but he did not have a good relationship with Pei, who also disapproved of the other three greater writers grouped with Luo — Wang, Yang, and Lu, instead favoring the talents of Wang Bo's brother Wang Ju (王勮) and Su Weidao. Eventually, Luo became a secretary at the county government of Chang'an County — one of the two counties making up the capital Chang'an — a low position that was however considered fairly prestigious due to its location at the capital.

== Participation in Li Jingye's rebellion ==
In 678, Luo Binwang was dismissed and imprisoned for criticising Wu Zetian, but was released the following year. After Emperor Gaozong's death and the subsequent takeover of Emperor Gaozong's wife Empress Dowager Wu (later known as Wu Zetian) as regent over initially their son Emperor Zhongzong, whom she quickly deposed, and then Emperor Ruizong, Luo made a number of suggestions to her, which she did not accept, and he was in turn demoted to the post of secretary general of Linhai County in 684. He and a number of similarly demoted officials met at Yang Prefecture (揚州, roughly modern Yangzhou, Jiangsu), and they, supporting Li Jingye the Duke of Ying as their leader, rose against Empress Dowager Wu at Yang Prefecture, claiming as their goal Emperor Zhongzong's restoration. Luo was in charge of the resistance forces' correspondences, and he wrote a particularly sharp-worded declaration against Empress Dowager Wu:

The wrongfully ruling Lady Wu has a disagreeable temper and a dishonorable ancestry. When she was serving as one of the ladies in Emperor Taizong's palace, she had once taken the opportunity, while Emperor Taizong was changing, to consummate a relationship with him. Later, her lack of virtue polluted the spring palace [i.e., the palace of then-crown prince Emperor Gaozong]. She secretly hid the fact that she had sexual relations with Emperor Taizong to treacherously receive the emperor's love. Once she got in the palace, she would not yield even in her brows; she falsely implicated others, and she used her fox-like charms to delude the emperor. She finally was able to put on an empress' clothes and put our emperor in position of committing incest. She has a heart similar to a snake and a lizard, and a disposition similar to a wolf. She is close to insidious individuals and murders the faithful and the good. She killed her sister, slaughtered her brothers, murdered her emperor, and poisoned her mother. Both gods and men hate her, and heaven and earth cannot allow her to exist. She continues to harbor a treasonous heart, seeking to steal the symbols of sovereignty. She put the emperor's beloved son under house arrest in another palace, while giving the relatives of thieves important responsibilities. Alas! There is no Huo Guang present, and the Marquess of Zhuxu has already been wiped out. When a swallow poked at an imperial prince, Han's rule was known to be at an end; when the dragons mated before the emperor, Xia's court was known to be failing.

Jingye is an old subject of imperial Tang, and a progeny of duke and marquess. He had seen the accomplishment of past emperors, and received great grace from this dynasty. The sadness of Weizi of Song was not without cause; were Yuan Junshan's tears to be for nought? Therefore, he gathered his anger and resolved to secure the empire. As the people of the realm are disappointed, and the state hopes for changes, he raises his flag of righteousness to clear away the evil.

We will connect with the Yue peoples to the south and conscript from the Yellow River region to the north. The iron-like horses will be gathered, and the jade-like wagon axles will connect with each other. The red rice from Hailing [海陵, in modern Taizhou, Jiangsu] will fill the storage, and as the yellow flag rises from the banks of the Yangtze, how distant can the Restoration be? As the sounds of the horses start, so does the north wind; and as the swords are drawn, the fighting sounds to the south cease. Even if we drone quietly the mountains will crumble, and if we yell out, the winds and clouds will change. As we use these to attack the enemy, what enemy will not be destroyed? As we seek to accomplish great things with these, what accomplishment is out of reach?

You, dukes, may be living in Han lands [i.e., in the central region of the state]; or you may be relations of the Zhou [i.e., related to the imperial clan]; or you may have been entrusted by word; or you may be asked to look after the imperial house. Your words are still ringing in your ears, so how can you forget your faithfulness? The soil on the new imperial tomb is not yet dry, and to whom can the two-meter-tall orphan be entrusted? If you can turn disaster into fortune, put things in the past, accomplish the Restoration together, and not forget about the will of the deceased emperor, your titles and rewards will be as permanent as the mountains and the rivers. If you hold your cities out against us and hesitate on the wrong path, disregarding the signs of the future, you will surely be executed. Look around the realm. Who is its actual ruler?

It was said that when Empress Dowager Wu read the declaration, she smiled and laughed at what he wrote. However, when she reached the portion that read, "The soil on the new imperial tomb is not yet dry, and to whom can the two-meter-tall orphan be entrusted?" she turned solemn, and she commented, "It is the fault of the chancellors that we lost this man's service." After Li Jingye's defeat later that year, Luo was also killed, and Empress Dowager Wu, impressed with his writing, sent people to gather them and publish them.

== Style ==
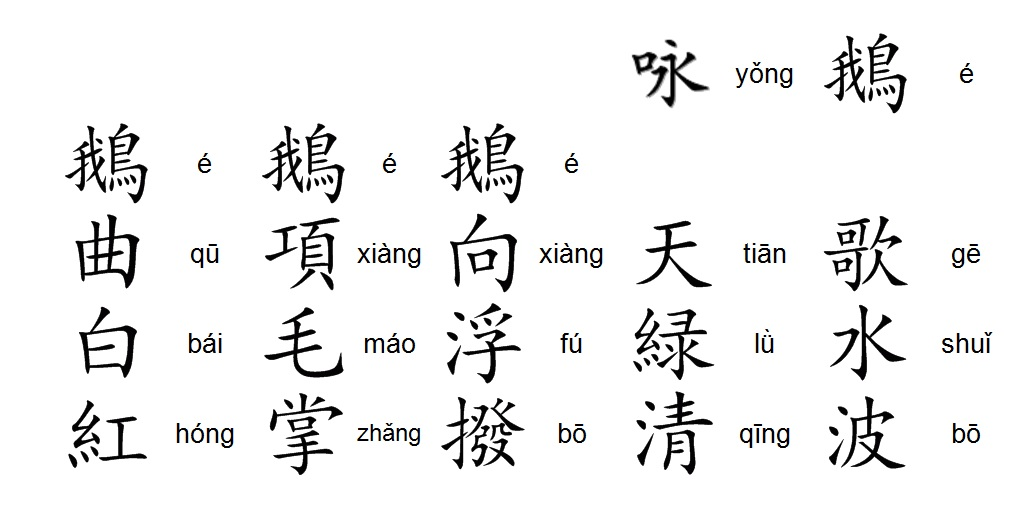
Ode to the Goose, traditional characters and pinyin

In prose, he was a master of the ornate pianwen 駢文 "parallel prose" style. His poetry (mostly gushi) is often similarly complex. Among his works is a long, autobiographical verse narrative, but he is best known for his poem "Ode to the Goose", said to have been written when he was seven years old. His "Ode to the Cicada" is also of great renown and influence.
