= Four Paragons of the Early Tang =

The Four Paragons of the Early Tang (Chinese: 初唐四傑; pinyin: Chū Táng Sì Jié) is a group name for four Chinese poets of the early Tang dynasty: Luo Binwang, Lu Zhaolin, Wang Bo, and Yang Jiong.

Four Paragons of the Early Tang

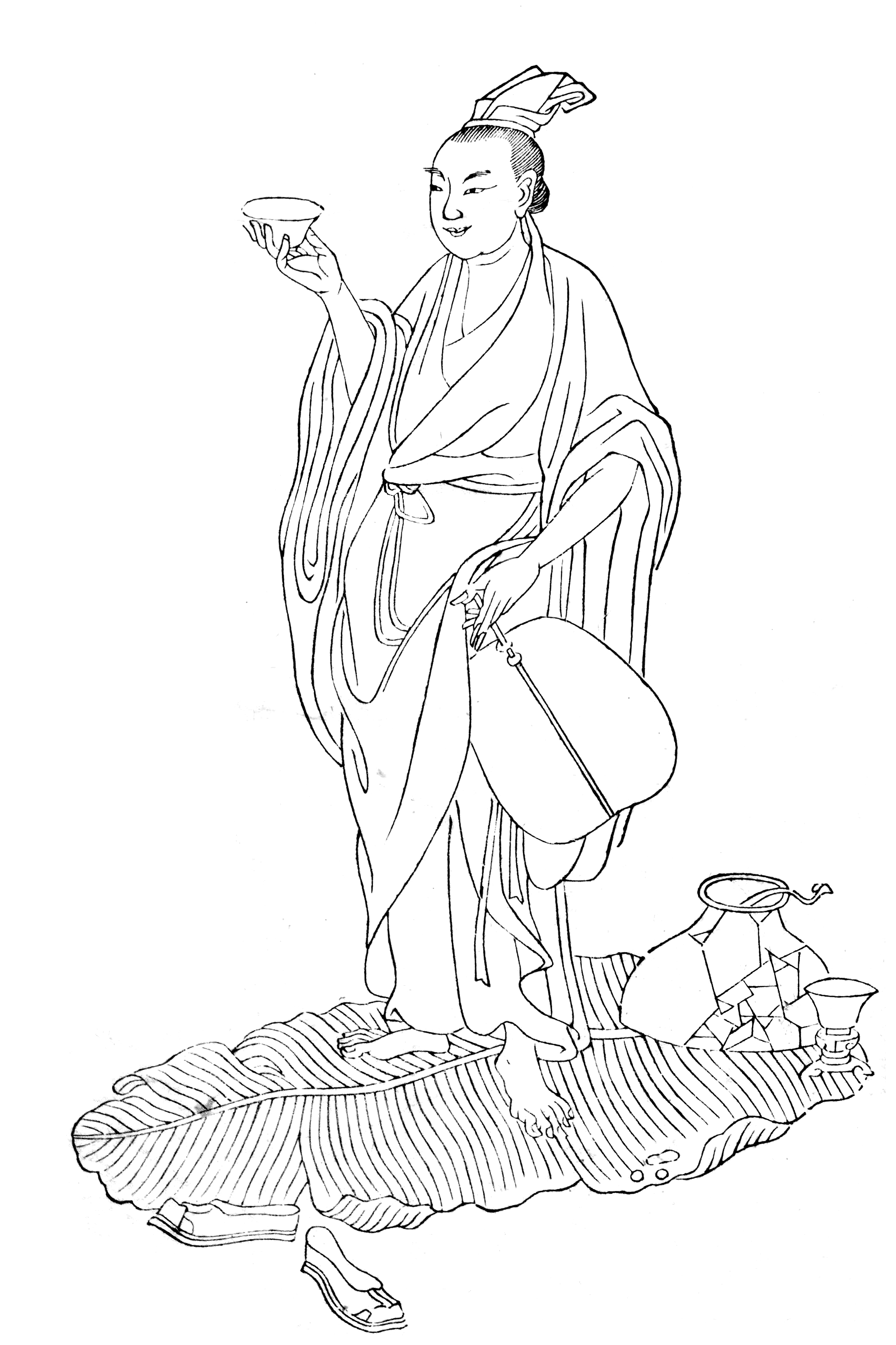
Wang Bo

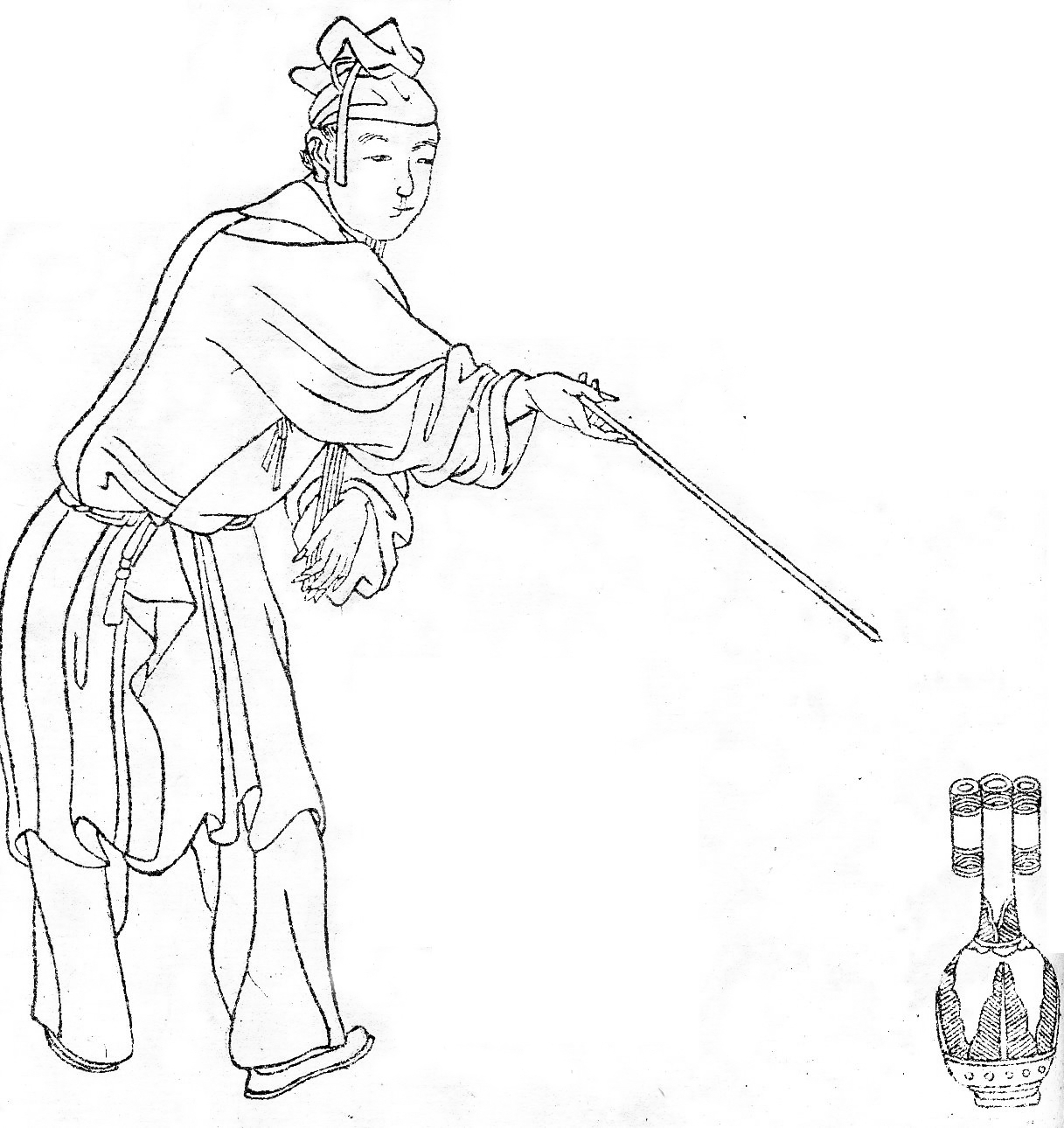
Yang Jiong

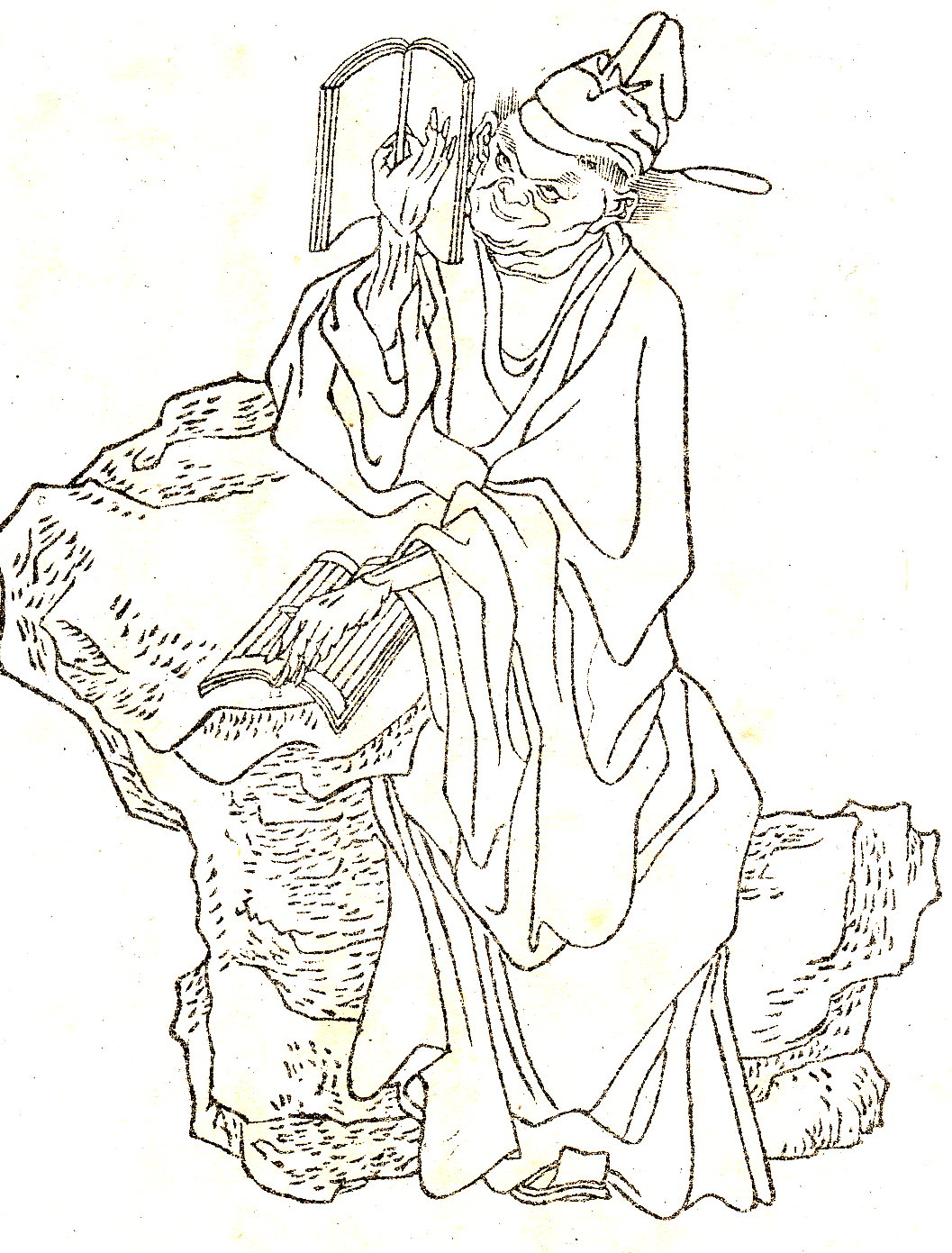
Lu Zhaolin

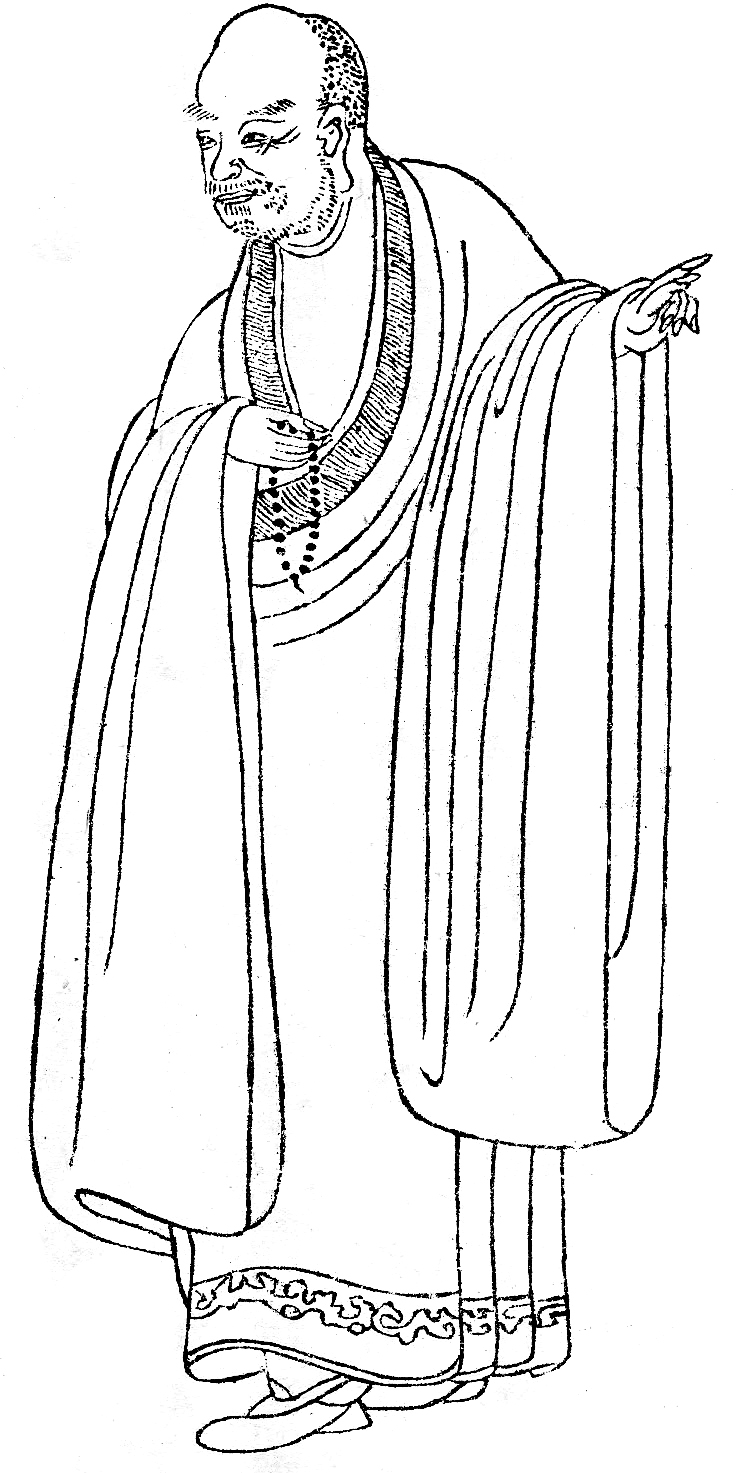
Luo Binwang

According to a Tang biography of Yang Dong, the four people enjoyed same popularity and fame in China. They thrived in the time of Emperor Gaozong.

The Four Eminences abolished the Gongti Style which had been used since the Southern Qi and Liang dynasty. The Wǔyán Lǜshī (Chinese: 五言律詩) passed through a critical phase of development under the four people's influence.

The rank of the Four Eminences has been the spotlight of discussion. Yang Jiong expressed his unwillingness to be put behind Wang Bo and in front of Lu Zhaolin.

== See also ==
- Tang poetry
- Classical Chinese poetry
