= Chu Guangxi =

Tang Dynastic poet

- 儲光羲
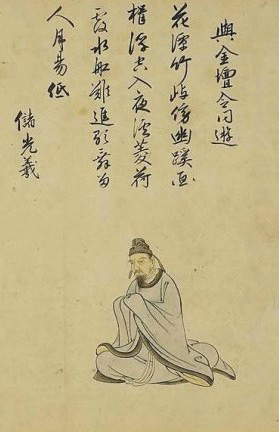
- Chu Guangxi, painted by Kanō Tsunenobu in the 18th century.
- Born: 706/707; Changzhou, Jiangsu, China
- Died: 760 (aged 53–54); 760 (aged 52–53); Guangdong, China
- Occupations: Poet, politician
- Notable work: "Mutong Ci" "Diaoyu Wan"

Chinese name
- Traditional Chinese: 儲光羲
- Simplified Chinese: 储光羲
Transcriptions
Standard Mandarin
- Hanyu Pinyin: Chú Guāngxiī

Chu Guangxi (Chinese: 儲光羲; pinyin: Chǔ Guāngxī; 706/707–760) was a Tang dynasty poet.

== Biography ==
Chu Guangxi was born in around 706 or 707, (Note: Britannica Kokusai Dai-Hyakkajiten gives 707, while Daijirin gives "706?".) and was originally from Yan Province (modern-day Shandong Province).

In the last year of the Tianbao era he was appointed investigating censor (simplified Chinese: 监察御史; traditional Chinese: 監察御史). He was implicated in the An Lushan Rebellion and exiled to Lingnan.

He died in c. 760. (Note: Britannica Kokusai Dai-Hyakkajiten gives "759?", while Daijirin gives "763?".)

== Poetry ==
His surviving poems, such as "Mutong Ci" (牧童詞 mù tóng cí) and "Diaoyu Wan" (釣魚灣 diào yú wān), are simple, elegant and pastoral.

== Works cited ==
- "Chu Guang-xi (Cho Kōgi in Japanese)". Britannica Kokusai Dai-Hyakkajiten (in Japanese). Encyclopædia Britannica, Inc. 2014.
- "Chu Guang-xi (Cho Kōgi in Japanese)". Daijirin (in Japanese). Sanseidō. 2006.
