= Du Fu =

Tang dynasty Chinese poet (712–770)

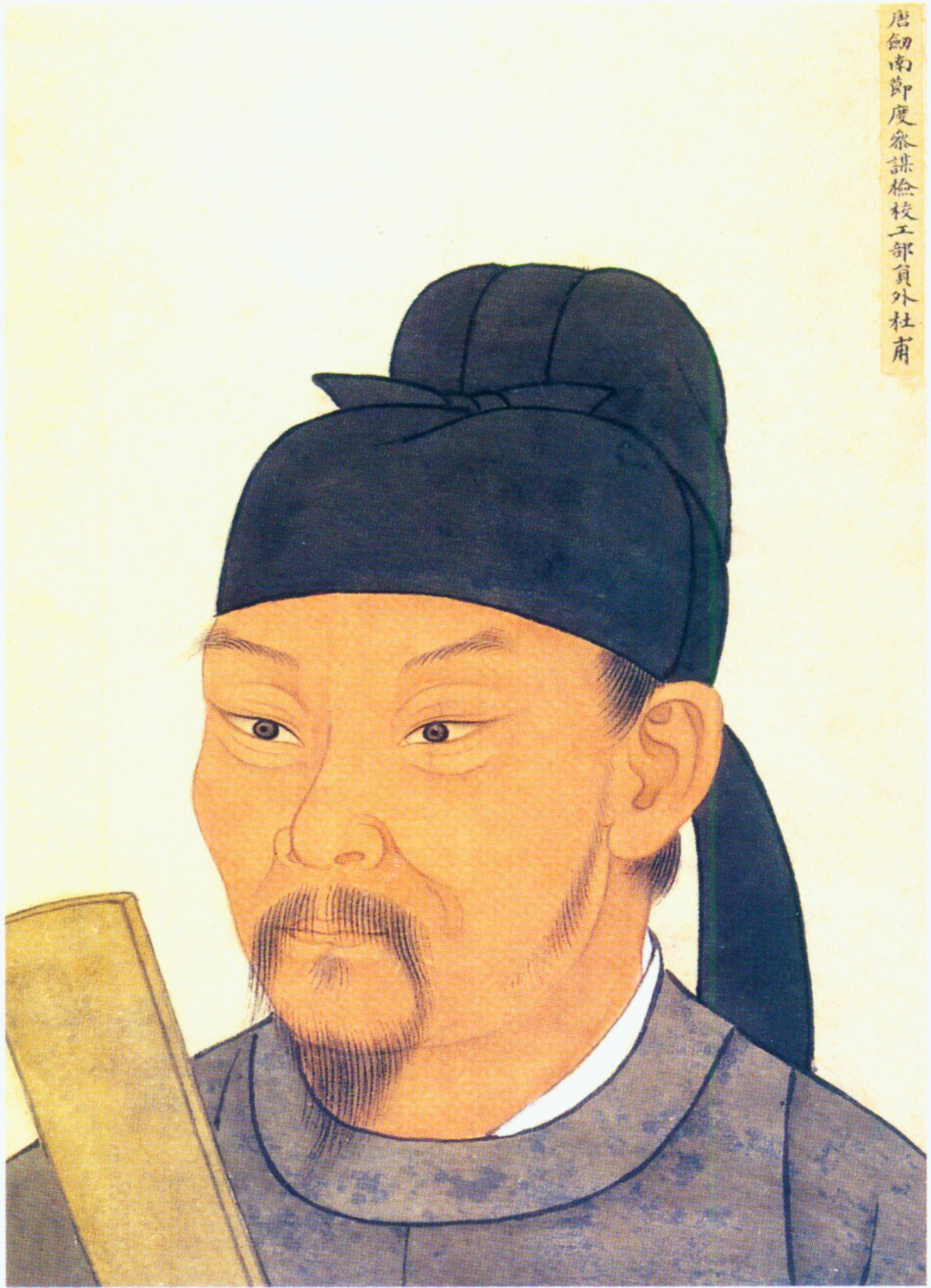
- Posthumous portrait
- Born: 712 possibly Gong County, Henan, Tang China
- Died: 770 (aged 57–58); Uncertain
- Occupations: Poet, government official
- Children: Zongwen; Zongwu; Feng'er
- Relatives: Du Shenyan (grandfather); Du Xian (father)

Du Fu
- Du's name in Chinese characters

Chinese name
- Chinese: 杜甫
Transcriptions
Standard Mandarin
- Hanyu Pinyin: Dù Fǔ
- Wade–Giles: Tu^{4} Fu^{3}
- IPA: [tû fù]
Wu
- Suzhounese: Dou^{6} Fu^{3}
Yue: Cantonese
- Yale Romanization: Douh Fú
- Jyutping: Dou6 Fu2
- IPA: [tɔw˨ fu˧˥]
Southern Min
- Hokkien POJ: Tō͘ Hú
- Tâi-lô: Tōo Hú
Middle Chinese
- Middle Chinese: /duo^{X} pɨo^{X}/

Courtesy name
- Chinese: 子美
Transcriptions
Standard Mandarin
- Hanyu Pinyin: Zǐmeǐ
- Wade–Giles: Tzu^{3}-mei^{3}
- IPA: [tsì.mèɪ]
Yue: Cantonese
- Yale Romanization: Jí-méih
- Jyutping: Zi2 mei5
- IPA: [tsi˧˥.mej˩˧]

Art name
- Chinese: 少陵野老
Transcriptions
Standard Mandarin
- Hanyu Pinyin: Shàolíng Yělǎo
- Wade–Giles: Shao^{4}-ling^{2} Yeh^{3}-lao^{3}
- IPA: [ʂâʊ.lǐŋ iɤ̀.làʊ]
Yue: Cantonese
- Yale Romanization: Siú-lìhng Yéh-lóuh
- Jyutping: Siu2 ling4 Je5 lou5
- IPA: [siw˧˥.lɪŋ˧˥ jɛ˩˧.lɔw˩˧]

Japanese name
- Kanji: 杜甫
- Hiragana: とほ
Transcriptions
- Romanization: To Ho

Du Fu (Chinese: 杜甫; pinyin: Dù Fǔ; Wade–Giles: Tu Fu; 712 – 770) was a Chinese poet and government official of the Tang dynasty. Together with his older contemporary and friend Li Bai, he is one of the principal poets associated with Tang poetry. Nearly 1,500 poems attributed to him survive.

Du Fu pursued an official career and briefly served as a remonstrance official at the imperial court. The An Lushan rebellion, which began in 755, displaced him and his family and shaped much of his later writing. He lived in Qinzhou and Chengdu before traveling through the middle Yangtze region. Du Fu died in 770; accounts differ on the place and cause of his death.

Later Chinese critics called Du Fu the "Poet-Historian" and the "Poet-Sage". His poetry records war, displacement, official life, family experience, and everyday observation, and influenced both Chinese and Japanese literary traditions.

== Life ==
Traditional Chinese literary criticism emphasized the life of the author when interpreting a work, a practice the American scholar Burton Watson attributed to "the close links that traditional Chinese thought posits between art and morality". Since many of Du Fu's poems feature morality and history, this practice is particularly important. Another reason, identified by the Chinese historian William Hung, is that Chinese poems are typically concise, omitting context that might be relevant but which an informed contemporary could be assumed to know. For modern Western readers, "The less accurately we know the time, the place and the circumstances in the background, the more liable we are to imagine it incorrectly, and the result will be that we either misunderstand the poem or fail to understand it altogether". American scholar Stephen Owen suggests a third factor particular to Du Fu, arguing that the variety of the poet's work required consideration of his whole life, rather than the "reductive" categorizations used for more limited poets.

=== Early years ===
Most of what is known of Du Fu's life comes from his poems. His paternal grandfather was Du Shenyan, a noted politician and poet during the reign of Empress Wu Zetian (r. 690–705). Du Fu was born in 712; his exact birthplace is unknown, but it was near Luoyang, Henan province (Gong county is a favorite candidate). In later life, he considered himself to belong to the capital city of Chang'an, the Du family's ancestral hometown.

Du Fu's mother died shortly after he was born, and he was partly raised by his aunt. He had an elder brother, who died young. He also had three half-brothers and a half-sister, to whom he frequently refers in his poems, though he never mentions his stepmother.

The son of a minor scholar-official, Du Fu spent his youth receiving the standard education for a future civil servant: study and memorization of the Confucian classics of philosophy, history and poetry. He later said he had produced creditable poems by his early teens, but these have been lost.

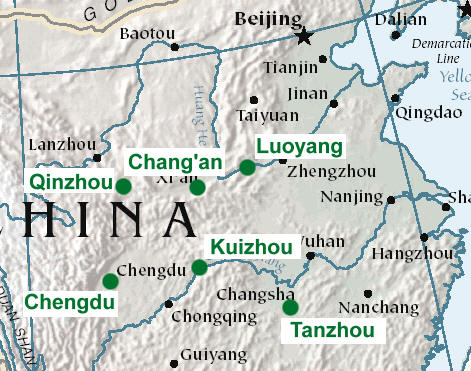
Du Fu's China

In the early 730s, Du Fu traveled in the Jiangsu and Zhejiang area; his earliest surviving poem, describing a poetry contest, is thought to date from the end of this period, around 735. In that year, he took the Imperial examination, likely in Chang'an. He failed, to his surprise and that of centuries of later critics. Hung concludes that he probably failed because his prose style at the time was too dense and obscure, while Chou suggests his failure to cultivate connections in the capital may have been to blame. After this failure, he went back to traveling, this time around Shandong and Hebei.

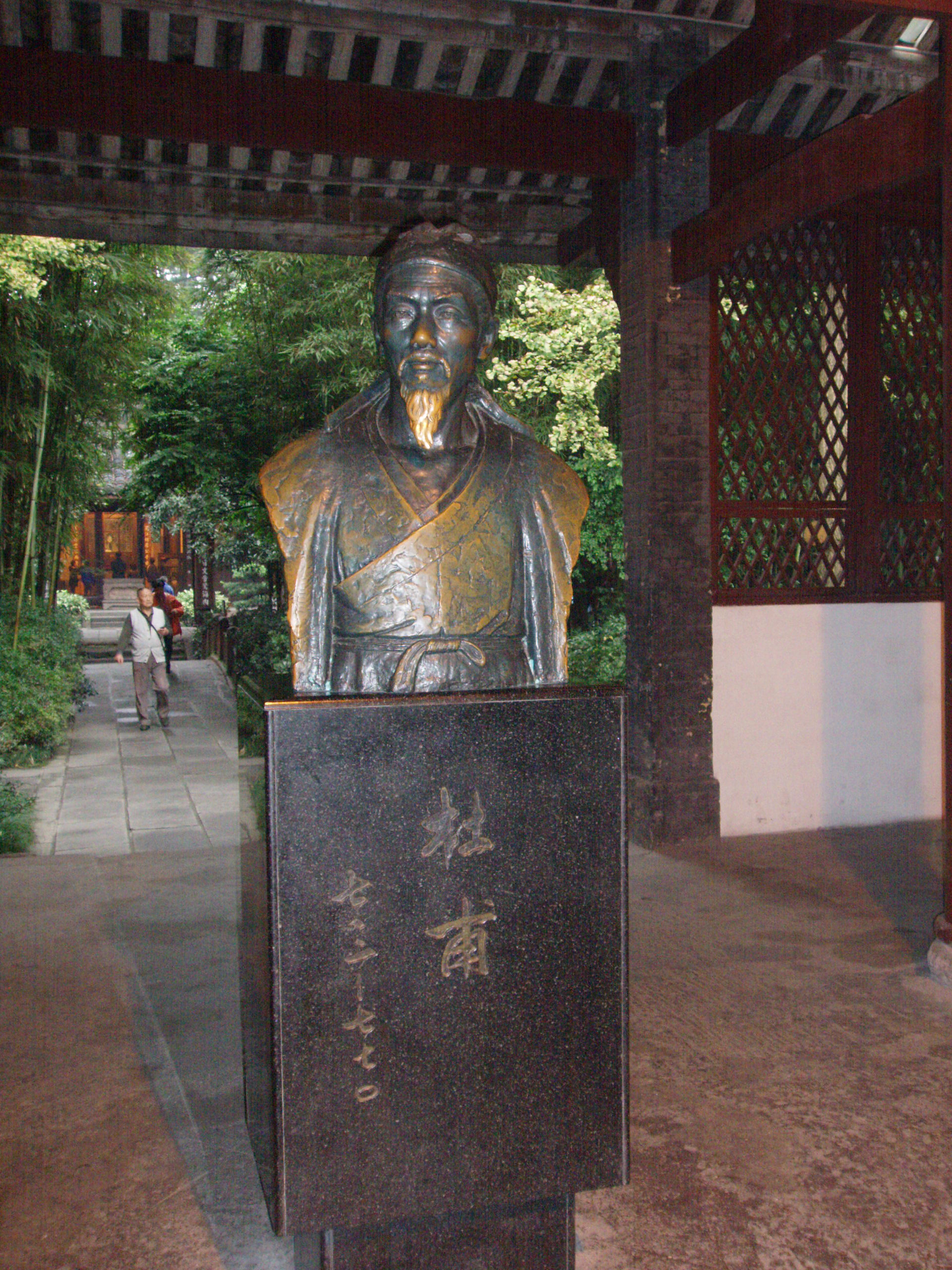
The statue in his Thatched Cottage, Chengdu, China

His father died around 740. Du Fu would have been allowed to enter the civil service because of his father's rank, but he is thought to have given up the privilege in favor of one of his half-brothers. He spent the next four years living in the Luoyang area, fulfilling his duties in domestic affairs.

In the autumn of 744, he met Li Bai (Li Po), and the two poets became friends. David Young calls this "the most significant formative element in Du Fu's artistic development" because it gave him a living example of the reclusive poet-scholar life to which he was attracted after failing the civil service exam. The relationship was somewhat one-sided: Du Fu was some years younger, and Li Bai was a poetic star. We have twelve poems to or about Li Bai from the younger poet, but only one in the other direction. They met again only once, in 745.

In 746, Du Fu moved to the capital in an attempt to resurrect his official career. He took the civil service exam again in 747, but all the candidates were failed by the prime minister (apparently in order to prevent the emergence of possible rivals). He never again attempted the examination, instead petitioning the emperor directly in 751, 754 and probably again in 755. He married around 752, and by 757 the couple had had five children—three sons and two daughters. One of the sons died in infancy in 755. From 754 he began to have lung problems (probably asthma), the first of a series of ailments that dogged him for the rest of his life. That year, Du Fu was forced to move his family due to the turmoil of a famine brought about by massive floods in the region.

In 755, he received an appointment as Registrar of the Right Commandant's office of the Crown Prince's Palace. This was a minor post, but in normal times it would have been at least the start of an official career. Even before he had begun work, however, the position was swept away by events.

=== War ===
The An Lushan rebellion began in December 755, and was not completely suppressed for almost eight years. It caused enormous disruption to Chinese society: the census of 754 recorded 52.9 million people, but ten years later, the census counted just 16.9 million, the remainder having been displaced or killed. During this time, Du Fu led a largely itinerant life unsettled by wars, associated famines and imperial displeasure. This period of unhappiness was the making of Du Fu as a poet: Eva Shan Chou has written that, "What he saw around him—the lives of his family, neighbors, and strangers– what he heard, and what he hoped for or feared from the progress of various campaigns—these became the enduring themes of his poetry". Even when he learned of the death of his youngest child, he turned to the suffering of others in his poetry instead of dwelling upon his own misfortunes: "Brooding on what I have lived through, if even I know such suffering, the common man must surely be rattled by the winds."

In 756, Emperor Xuanzong was forced to flee the capital and abdicate. Du Fu, who had been away from the city, took his family to a place of safety and attempted to join the court of the new emperor (Suzong), but he was captured by the rebels and taken to Chang'an. In the autumn, his youngest son, Du Zongwu (Baby Bear), was born. Around this time Du Fu is thought to have contracted malaria. His well-known poem "The View in Spring" (Chūn wàng 春望) movingly conveys a glimpse of life in Chang'an under rebel occupation:

A kingdom smashed, its hills and rivers still here,
Spring in the city, plants and trees grow deep.
Moved by the moment, flowers splash with tears,
Alarmed at parting, birds startle the heart.
War's beacon fires have gone on three months,
Letters from home are worth thousands in gold.
Fingers run through white hair until it thins,
Cap-pins will almost no longer hold.

國破山河在，
城春草木深。
感時花濺淚，
恨別鳥驚心。
烽火連三月，
家書抵萬金。
白頭搔更短，
渾欲不勝簪。

— "The View in Spring" (Chūn wàng 春望), translated by Stephen Owen.

He escaped from Chang'an the following year, and was appointed Reminder when he rejoined the court in May 757. This post gave access to the emperor but was largely ceremonial. Du Fu's conscientiousness compelled him to try to make use of it: he caused trouble for himself by protesting the removal of his friend and patron Fang Guan on a petty charge. He was arrested but was pardoned in June. In September, Emperor Suzong granted Du Fu leave to visit his family, whom he had sent to a northern village for safety. Du Fu commemorated the reunion with a tripartite poem named "Jiang Village", after the village where they were staying.

From west of the towering ochre clouds
The sun's rays descend to the plain.
In the brushwood gate birds raise a racket:
From a thousand miles the traveler comes home.
Wife and children are amazed I survived,
When surprise settles, they wipe away tears.
I was swept along in the turmoil of the times,
By chance I managed to get back alive.
Our neighbors are filling the wall,
Deeply moved, they're sobbing too.
Toward night's end I take another candle,
And face you, as if still in a dream.

崢嶸赤雲西，
日腳下平地。
柴門鳥雀噪，
歸客千里至。
妻孥怪我在，
驚定還拭淚。
世亂遭飄蕩，
生還偶然遂。
鄰人滿牆頭，
感歎亦歔欷。
夜闌更秉燭，
相對如夢寐。

— First of "Jiang Village, Three Poems" (Jiāngcūn sānshǒu 羌村三首), translated by Stephen Owen.

Du Fu soon rejoined the court and on 8 December 757, he returned to Chang'an with the emperor following its recapture by government forces. However, his advice continued to be unappreciated, and in the summer of 758 he was demoted to a post as Commissioner of Education in Huazhou. The position was not to his taste: in one poem, he wrote:

I am about to scream madly in the office,
Especially when they bring more papers to pile higher on my desk.

束帶發狂欲大叫，
簿書何急來相仍。

— from "Early Autumn, Miserable Heat, Papers Piling Up" (Zǎoqiū kǔrè duī'àn xiāngréng 早秋苦熱堆案相仍), translated by William Hung.

He moved on in the summer of 759; this has traditionally been ascribed to famine, but Hung believes that frustration is a more likely reason. He next spent around six weeks in Qinzhou (now Tianshui, Gansu province), where he wrote more than sixty poems.

=== Chengdu ===
In December 759, after a brief stay in Tonggu (modern Gansu), Du Fu journeyed southwest to Chengdu, where he was hosted by local Prefect and fellow poet Pei Di. Du subsequently based himself in Sichuan for most of the next five years. By the autumn of that year he was in financial trouble, and sent poems begging help to various acquaintances. He was relieved by Yan Wu, a friend and former colleague who was appointed governor general at Chengdu. Despite his financial problems, Du Fu's time in Chengdu, the "Brocade City", was one of the happiest and most peaceful periods of his life. Many of his poems from this period are peaceful depictions of life in his simple thatched cottage, a reconstruction of which is now a popular tourist attraction.

A good rain knows its season,
It brings things to life right in spring.
It enters the night, unseen with the breeze;
It moistens things gently and without sound.
Over paths through moors are clouds all black,
A boat on the river, a single fire bright.
At daybreak look where the red is soaked,
The blossoms are heavy in Brocade City.

好雨知時節，
當春乃發生。
隨風潛入夜，
潤物細無聲。
野徑雲俱黑，
江船火獨明。
曉看紅溼處，
花重錦官城。

— "Enjoying Rain on a Spring Night" (Chūnyè xǐ yǔ 春夜喜雨), translated by Stephen Owen.

In 762, Du Fu left the city to escape a rebellion, but he returned in summer 764 when he was appointed an advisor to Yan, who was involved in campaigns against the Tibetan Empire.

=== Last years ===
Luoyang, the region of his birthplace, was recovered by government forces in the winter of 762, and in the spring of 765 Du Fu and his family sailed down the Yangtze, apparently with the intention of making their way there. They travelled slowly, held up by his ill-health (by this time he was suffering from poor eyesight, deafness and general old age in addition to his previous ailments). They stayed in Kuizhou (in what is now Baidicheng, Chongqing) at the entrance to the Three Gorges for almost two years from late spring 766. This period was Du Fu's last great poetic flowering, and here he wrote 400 poems in his dense, late style. In autumn 766, Bo Maolin became governor of the region: he supported Du Fu financially and employed him as his unofficial secretary.

In March 768, he resumed his journey and got as far as Hunan province, where he died in Tanzhou (now Changsha) in November or December 770, in his 58th year. He was survived by his wife and two sons, who remained in the area for some years at least. His last known descendant is a grandson who requested a grave inscription for the poet from Yuan Zhen in 813. Hung summarises his life by concluding that, "He appeared to be a filial son, an affectionate father, a generous brother, a faithful husband, a loyal friend, a dutiful official, and a patriotic subject."

Below is an example of one of Du Fu's later works. Like many other poems in the Tang it featured the theme of a long parting between friends, which was often due to officials being frequently transferred to the provinces:

It is almost as hard for friends to meet
As for the Orion and Scorpius.
Tonight then is a rare event,
Joining, in the candlelight,
Two men who were young not long ago
But now are turning grey at the temples.
To find that half our friends are dead
Shocks us, burns our hearts with grief.
We little guessed it would be twenty years
Before I could visit you again.
When I went away, you were still unmarried;
But now these boys and girls in a row
Are very kind to their father's old friend.
They ask me where I have been on my journey;
And then, when we have talked awhile,
They bring and show me wines and dishes,
Spring chives cut in the night-rain
And brown rice cooked freshly a special way.
My host proclaims it a festival,
He urges me to drink ten cups—
But what ten cups could make me as drunk
As I always am with your love in my heart?
Tomorrow the mountains will separate us;
After tomorrow—who can say?

人生不相見，
動如參與商。
今夕復何夕，
共此燈燭光。
少壯能幾時，
鬢髮各已蒼。
訪舊半為鬼，
驚呼熱中腸。
焉知二十載，
重上君子堂。
昔別君未婚，
兒女忽成行。
怡然敬父執，
問我來何方。
問答乃未已，
兒女羅酒漿。
夜雨翦春韭，
新炊間黃粱。
主稱會面難，
一舉累十觴。
十觴亦不醉，
感子故意長。
明日隔山嶽，
世事兩茫茫。

— "To My Retired Friend Wei" (Zēng Wèi Bā Chǔshì 贈衛八處士)

=== Health ===
Du Fu is the first person in the historical record identified as a diabetic patient. In his later years, he suffered from diabetes and pulmonary tuberculosis, and died on board a ship on the Yangtze, aged 58 years old.

== Works ==
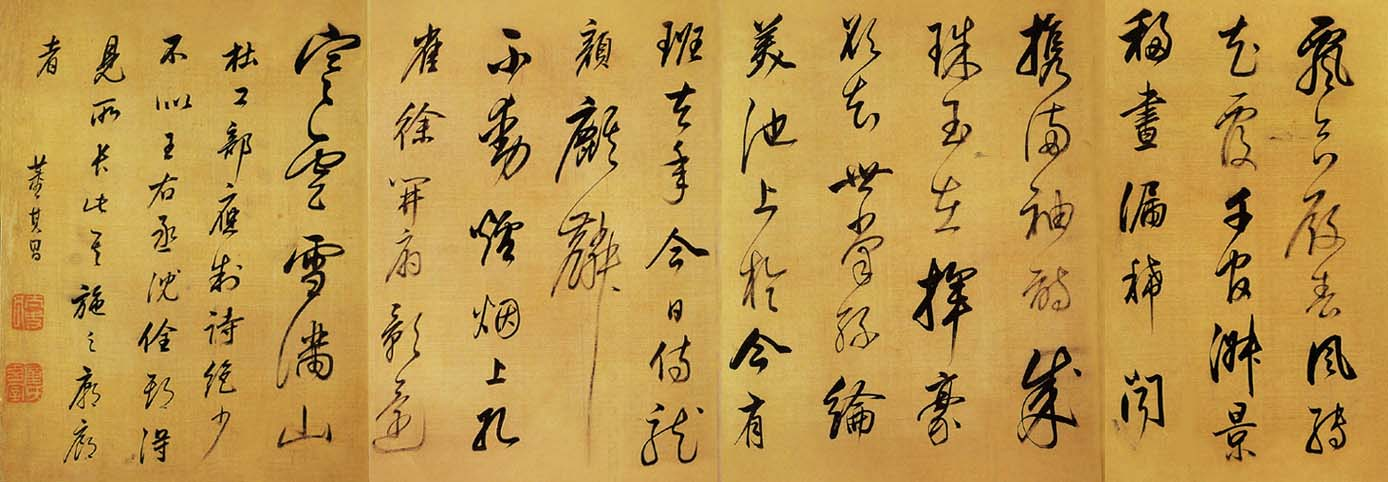
A calligraphic copy of Du Fu's poem "Zui Ge Xing" by Dong Qichang

Criticism of Du Fu's works has focused on his strong sense of history, his moral engagement, and his technical excellence.

=== History ===
Since the Song dynasty, critics have called Du Fu the "poet for history" (詩史, shī shǐ). The most directly historical of his poems are those commenting on military tactics or the successes and failures of the government, or the poems of advice which he wrote to the emperor. Indirectly, he wrote about the effect of the times in which he lived on himself, and on the ordinary people of China. As Watson notes, this is information "of a kind seldom found in the officially compiled histories of the era".

Such bustling hubbub, as our troops
Pound earthen walls on Tong Pass Road.
No iron can match the main wall,
With lesser walls rising thousands of yards.
I ask the Tong Pass officer,
"When repaired, can it then repel the Turk?"
He invites me to get off my horse and walk
As he points out the mountain's folds to me.
"Ramparts stretch all the way to the clouds,
A bird in flight could not pass through.
If the Turks come, just hold this fast,
The Western Capital need worry no more.
Just look, sir, at those strategic points!—
So narrow they let just one cart through.
In danger just snatch a long pike,
One man could hold it forever."
How sad, though, the Peach Grove battle,
When a million men were fed to the fish.
"Do instruct the general guarding the pass
Not to follow the model of Ge-shu Han."

士卒何草草，
築城潼關道。
大城鐵不如，
小城萬丈餘。
借問潼關吏，
修關還備胡。
要我下馬行，
為我指山隅，
連雲列戰格，
飛鳥不能逾。
胡來但自守，
豈復憂西都。
丈人視要處，
窄狹容單車。
艱難奮長戟，
萬古用一夫。
哀哉桃林戰，
百萬化為魚。
請囑防關將，
慎勿學哥舒。

— "The Officer at Tong Pass" (Tóng Guān lì 潼關吏), translated by Stephen Owen.

Du Fu's political comments are based on emotion rather than calculation: his prescriptions have been paraphrased as, "Let us all be less selfish, let us all do what we are supposed to do". Since his views were impossible to disagree with, his forcefully expressed truisms enabled his installation as the central figure of Chinese poetic history.

=== Moral engagement ===
A second favourite epithet of Chinese critics is that of "poet sage" (詩聖, shī shèng), a counterpart to the philosophical sage, Confucius. One of the earliest surviving works, The Song of the Wagons (from around 750), gives voice to the sufferings of a conscript soldier in the imperial army and a clear-sighted consciousness of suffering. These concerns are continuously articulated in poems on the lives of both soldiers and civilians produced by Du Fu throughout his life.

Although Du Fu's frequent references to his own difficulties can give the impression of an all-consuming solipsism, Hawkes argues that his "famous compassion in fact includes himself, viewed quite objectively and almost as an afterthought". He therefore "lends grandeur" to the wider picture by comparing it to "his own slightly comical triviality".

Du Fu's compassion, for himself and for others, was part of his general broadening of the scope of poetry: he devoted many works to topics which had previously been considered unsuitable for poetic treatment. Zhang Jie wrote that for Du Fu, "everything in this world is poetry", Du wrote extensively on subjects such as domestic life, calligraphy, paintings, animals, and other poems.

=== Technical excellence ===
Du Fu's work is notable above all for its range. Chinese critics traditionally used the term jídàchéng (集大成, "complete symphony"), a reference to Mencius' description of Confucius. Yuan Zhen was the first to note the breadth of Du Fu's achievement, writing in 813 that his predecessor "united in his work traits which previous men had displayed only singly". He mastered all the forms of Chinese poetry: Chou says that in every form he "either made outstanding advances or contributed outstanding examples". Furthermore, his poems use a wide range of registers, from the direct and colloquial to the allusive and self-consciously literary. This variety is manifested even within individual works: Owen identifies the, "rapid stylistic and thematic shifts" in poems which enable the poet to represent different facets of a situation, while Chou uses the term "juxtaposition" as the major analytical tool in her work.

Du Fu is noted for having written more on poetics and painting than any other writer of his time. He was the first Chinese poet to write extensively on painting. His 18 poems on the subject, such as "Song of a Painting for General Cao Ba" (Dānqīng yǐnzèng Cáo Bà jiàngjūn 丹青引贈曹霸將軍) and "Ballad of the Painted Eagle" (Huà gǔ xíng 畫鶻行), quoted below, often served as reflections upon art in general and are considered some of his finest work. Du Fu's seemingly negative commentary on the prized horse paintings of Han Gan ignited a controversy that has persisted to the present day.

High in the hall I saw a live bird,
Vibrant, its bones of autumn stirred,
And at first I marveled how without the jesses
They got it to stand there looming.
Then I understood, it was a painter's marvel,
A skill that scraped a hole in Creation,
And drew this stance of godlike grandeur
To serve as a creature in your eyes.
Magpies and crows fill the low-bending boughs,
They soar aloft, fearing its coming forth.
It tilts its skull and looks at blue clouds,
Never to hide from the common bird.
Its long wings are like knives or swords
That might carry it over the realm of men.
Between Earth and Sky is a vast, empty height,
And a moment of gloom in the powder and ink.
It yearns for far places, cloudy sands' edge,
It has the flesh of haze and fog.
Why now do my thoughts feel such pain,
As I walk, looking back, feelings twisted within?

高堂見生鶻，
颯爽動秋骨。
初驚無拘攣，
何得立突兀。
乃知畫師妙，
功刮造化窟。
寫作神駿姿，
充君眼中物。
烏鵲滿樛枝，
軒然恐其出。
側腦看青霄，
寧爲衆禽沒。
長翮如刀劍，
人寰可超越。
乾坤空崢嶸，
粉墨且蕭瑟。
緬思雲沙際，
自有煙霧質。
吾今意何傷，
顧步獨紆鬱。

— "Ballad of the Painted Eagle" (Huà gǔ xíng 畫鶻行), translated by Stephen Owen.

The tenor of his work changed as he developed his style and adapted to his surroundings ("chameleon-like" according to Watson): his earliest works are in a relatively derivative, courtly style, but he came into his own in the years of the rebellion. Owen comments on the "grim simplicity" of the Qinzhou poems, which mirrors the desert landscape; the works from his Chengdu period are "light, often finely observed"; while the poems from the late Kuizhou period have a "density and power of vision".

Although he wrote in all poetic forms, Du Fu is best known for his lüshi, a type of poem with strict constraints on form and content, for example:

Leaving the Audience by the quiet corridors,
Stately and beautiful, we pass through the Palace gates,
Turning in different directions: you go to the West
With the Ministers of State. I, otherwise.

On my side, the willow-twigs are fragile, greening.
You are struck by scarlet flowers over there.
Our separate ways! You write so well, so kindly,
To caution, in vain, a garrulous old man.

窈窕清禁闥，
罷朝歸不同。
君隨丞相後，
我往日華東。

冉冉柳枝碧，
娟娟花蕊紅。
故人得佳句，
獨贈白頭翁。

— "Memorial in Reply to a Friend's Advice" (Fèng dá Cén Shēn Bǔquē jiàn zèng 奉答岑參補闕見贈).

About two-thirds of Du Fu's 1,500 extant works are in this form, and he is generally considered to be its leading exponent. His best lǜshi use the parallelisms required by the form to add expressive content rather than as mere technical restrictions. Hawkes comments that "it is amazing that Tu Fu is able to use so immensely stylized a form in so natural a manner".

== Influence ==
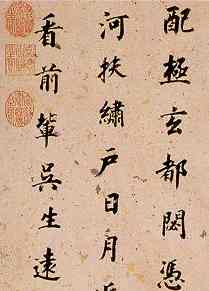
Part of Du Fu's poem "On Visiting the Temple of Laozi", as written by Dong Qichang

According to the Encyclopædia Britannica, Du Fu's writings are considered by many literary critics to be among the greatest of all time, and it states "his dense, compressed language makes use of all the connotative overtones of a phrase and of all the intonational potentials of the individual word, qualities that no translation can ever reveal."

In his lifetime and immediately following his death, Du Fu was not greatly appreciated. In part this can be attributed to his stylistic and formal innovations, some of which are still "considered extremely daring and bizarre by Chinese critics." There are few contemporary references to him—only eleven poems from six writers—and these describe him in terms of affection, but not as a paragon of poetic or moral ideals. Du Fu is also poorly represented in contemporary anthologies of poetry.

However, as Hung notes, he "is the only Chinese poet whose influence grew with time", and his works began to increase in popularity in the ninth century. Early positive comments came from Bai Juyi, who praised the moral sentiments of some of Du Fu's works (although he found these in only a small fraction of the poems), and from Han Yu, who wrote a piece defending Du Fu and Li Bai on aesthetic grounds from attacks made against them. Both these writers showed the influence of Du Fu in their own poetic work. By the beginning of the 10th century, Wei Zhuang constructed the first replica of his thatched cottage in Sichuan.

It was in the 11th century, during the Northern Song era that Du Fu's reputation reached its peak. In this period a comprehensive re-evaluation of earlier poets took place, in which Wang Wei, Li Bai and Du Fu came to be regarded as representing respectively the Buddhist, Daoist and Confucian strands of Chinese culture. At the same time, the development of Neo-Confucianism ensured that Du Fu, as its poetic exemplar, occupied the paramount position. Su Shi famously expressed this reasoning when he wrote that Du Fu was "preeminent ... because ... through all his vicissitudes, he never for the space of a meal forgot his sovereign". His influence was helped by his ability to reconcile apparent opposites: political conservatives were attracted by his loyalty to the established order, while political radicals embraced his concern for the poor. Literary conservatives could look to his technical mastery, while literary radicals were inspired by his innovations. Since the establishment of the People's Republic of China, Du Fu's loyalty to the state and concern for the poor have been interpreted as embryonic nationalism and socialism, and he has been praised for his use of simple, "people's language".

Du Fu's popularity grew to such an extent that it is as hard to measure his influence as that of Shakespeare in England: it was hard for any Chinese poet not to be influenced by him. While there was never another Du Fu, individual poets followed in the traditions of specific aspects of his work: Bai Juyi's concern for the poor, Lu You's patriotism, and Mei Yaochen's reflections on the quotidian are a few examples. More broadly, Du Fu's work in transforming the lǜshi from mere word play into "a vehicle for serious poetic utterance" set the stage for every subsequent writer in the genre.

In its publishing of Burton Watson's translation of Du Fu's poems, the Columbia University Press commented that Du Fu "has been called China's greatest poet, and some call him the greatest nonepic, nondramatic poet whose writings survive in any language."

=== Influence on Japanese literature ===
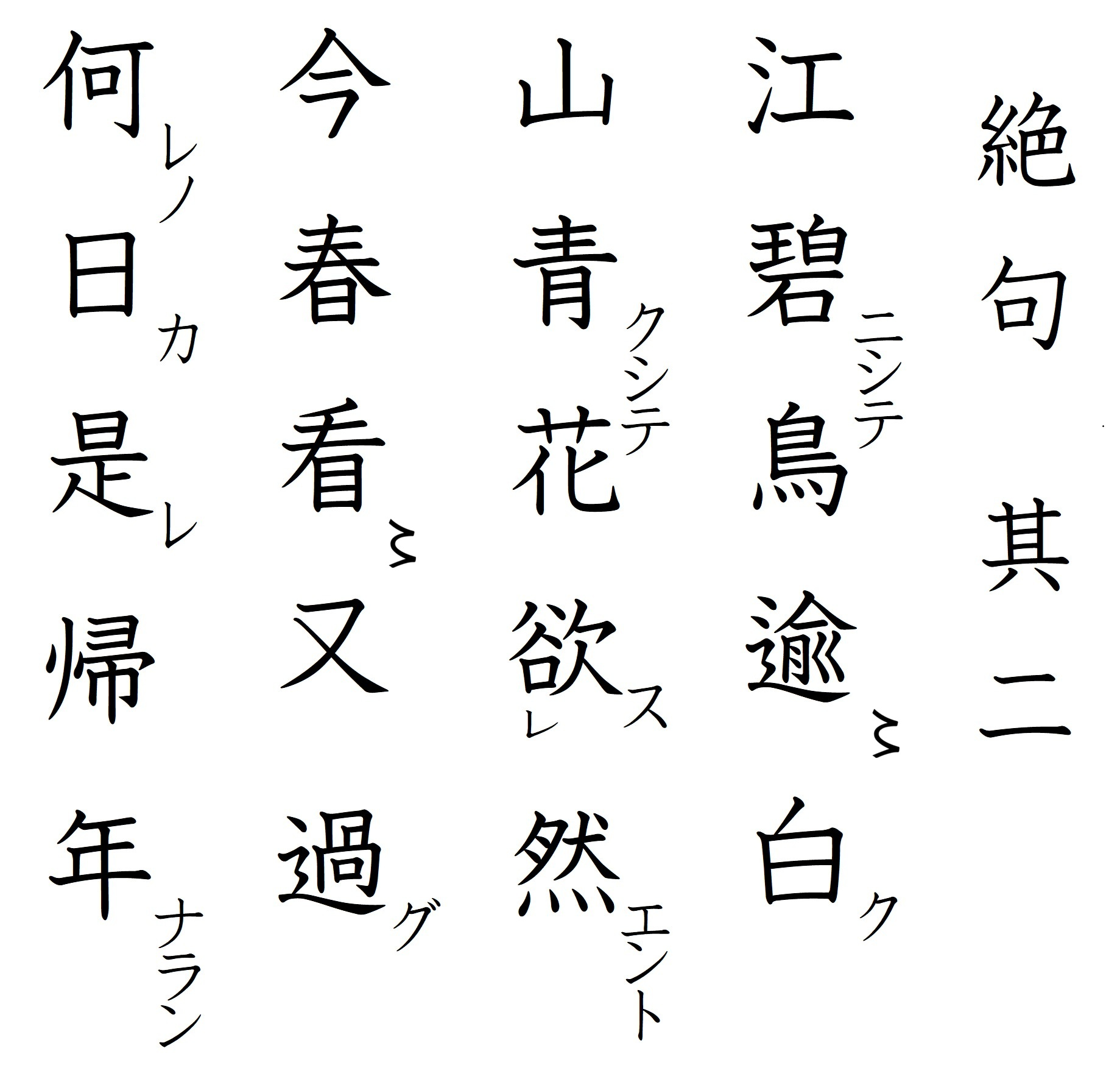
Notation of “Two Quatrains, II” according to Kanbun-kundoku (the Japanese traditional method of reading and translating Classical Chinese). (The meaning of this poem: The river is blue, and the birds look even whiter. The mountains are green, and the flowers are about to burn with color. Watching this spring pass by once again. On what day will the year of my return arrive?)

Du Fu's poetry has made a profound impact on Japanese literature, especially on the literature from the Muromachi period and on scholars and poets in the Edo period, including Matsuo Bashō, the very greatest of all haiku poets. Even in modern Japanese, the term Saint of Poetry (詩聖, shisei) is mostly synonymous with Du Fu.

Until the 13th century, the Japanese preferred Bai Juyi above all poets and there were few references to Du Fu, although his influence can be seen in some kanshi ("Chinese poetry made by Japanese poets") anthologies such as Bunka Shūreishū in the 9th century. The first notable Japanese appreciator of Du Fu's poetry was Kokan Shiren (1278–1346), a Rinzai Zen patriarch and one of the most prominent authors of the literature of the Five Mountains; he highly praised Du Fu and made a commentary on some poems of Du Fu from the perspective of a Zen priest in Vol. 11 of Saihokushū. His student Chūgan Engetsu composed many kanshi which were clearly stated to be "influenced by Du Fu" in their prefaces. Chūgan's student Gidō Shūshin had close connection with the Court and Ashikaga Shogunate and propagated Du Fu's poetry in the mundane world; one day Nijō Yoshimoto, the Kampaku regent of the Court and the highest authority of renga poetry, asked Gidō, "Should I learn the poetry of Du Fu and Li Bai?" Gidō dared to reply, "Yes if you do have enough capability. No if do not." Since then, there had been many seminars on Du Fu's poetry both in Zen temples and in the aristocratic society, and as a result his poetry was often cited in Japanese literature in the Muromachi period, e.g., Taiheiki, a historical epic in the late 14th century, and some noh plays such as Hyakuman, Bashō, and Shunkan.

During the Kan'ei era of the Edo period (1624–1643), Shào Chuán (邵傳) of the Ming Dynasty's Collective Commentary on Du Fu's Lǜshi (杜律集解, Toritsu Shikkai) was imported into Japan, and it gained explosive popularity in Confucian scholars and chōnin (townspeople) class. The commentary established Du Fu's fame as the highest of all poets; for instance, Hayashi Shunsai, a notable Confucian scholar, commented in Vol. 37 of Gahō Bunshū that Zǐměi [Du Fu] was the very best poet in history and praised Shào Chuán's commentary for its simplicity and readability, while he criticised old commentaries during the Yuan Dynasty as too unfathomable. Matsuo Bashō, the greatest haiku poet, was also strongly influenced by Du Fu; in Oku no Hosomichi, his masterpiece, he cites the first two lines of A Spring View (春望) before a haiku as its introduction and also many of his other haiku have similar wording and themes. It is said that when he died in Osaka during a long travel, a copy of Du Fu's poetry was found with him as one of a few precious items which he was able to carry around.

== Translation ==
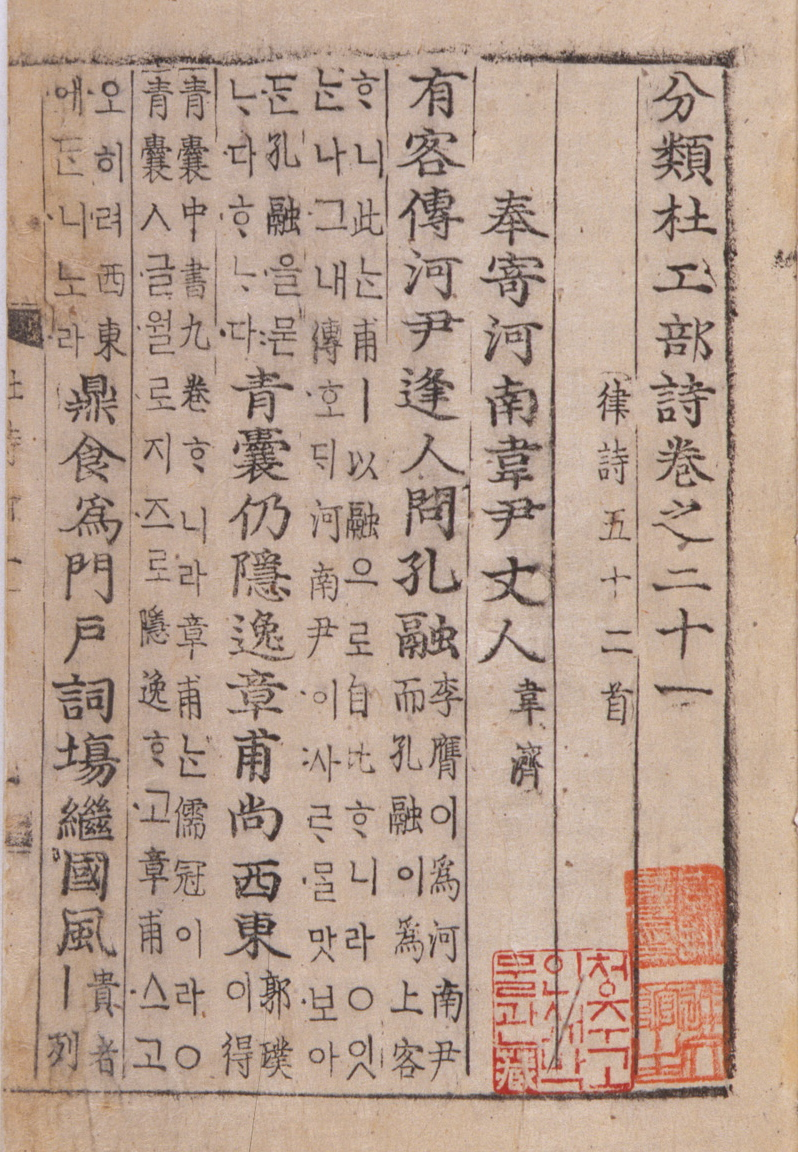
A Korean translated book of Du Fu's poems, 1481

A variety of styles have been used in efforts to translate Du Fu's work into English. As Burton Watson remarks in The Selected Poems of Du Fu, "There are many different ways to approach the problems involved in translating Du Fu, which is why we need as many different translations as possible" (p. xxii). The translators have had to contend with bringing out the formal constraints of the original without sounding laboured to a Western ear (particularly when translating regulated verse, or lǜshi), and accommodating the complex allusions contained particularly in the later works (Hawkes writes that "his poems do not as a rule come through very well in translation"—p. ix).

One extreme on each issue is represented by Kenneth Rexroth's One Hundred Poems from the Chinese. His are free translations, which seek to conceal the parallelisms through enjambement and expansion and contraction of the content; his responses to the allusions are firstly to omit most of these poems from his selection, and secondly to "translate out" the references in those works which he does select. Vikram Seth in Three Chinese Poets uses English-style rhyme schemes, whereas Keith Holyoak in Facing the Moon approximates the Chinese rhyme scheme; both use end-stopped lines and preserve some degree of parallelism. In The Selected Poems of Du Fu, Burton Watson follows the parallelisms quite strictly, persuading the western reader to adapt to the poems rather than vice versa. Similarly, he deals with the allusion of the later works by combining literal translation with extensive annotation. Arthur Cooper also translated selected poems of Du Fu and Li Bai, which were published under the Penguin Classics imprint. David Hinton has also published selected poems for New Directions, first in 1989 followed by an expanded and revised edition in 2020. In 2015, Stephen Owen published annotated translations, with facing Chinese texts, of the complete poetry of Du Fu in six volumes.

== See also ==
- "Autumn Day in Kui Prefecture"
- "Chunwang (poem)"
- Classical Chinese poetry
- Simians (Chinese poetry)
- Tang Dynasty art
- Tang poetry
- Three perfections – integration of calligraphy, poetry and painting
- Du Fu Thatched Cottage
- Du Fu River Pavilion
