= Scholar-official =

Learned men in government in Imperial China

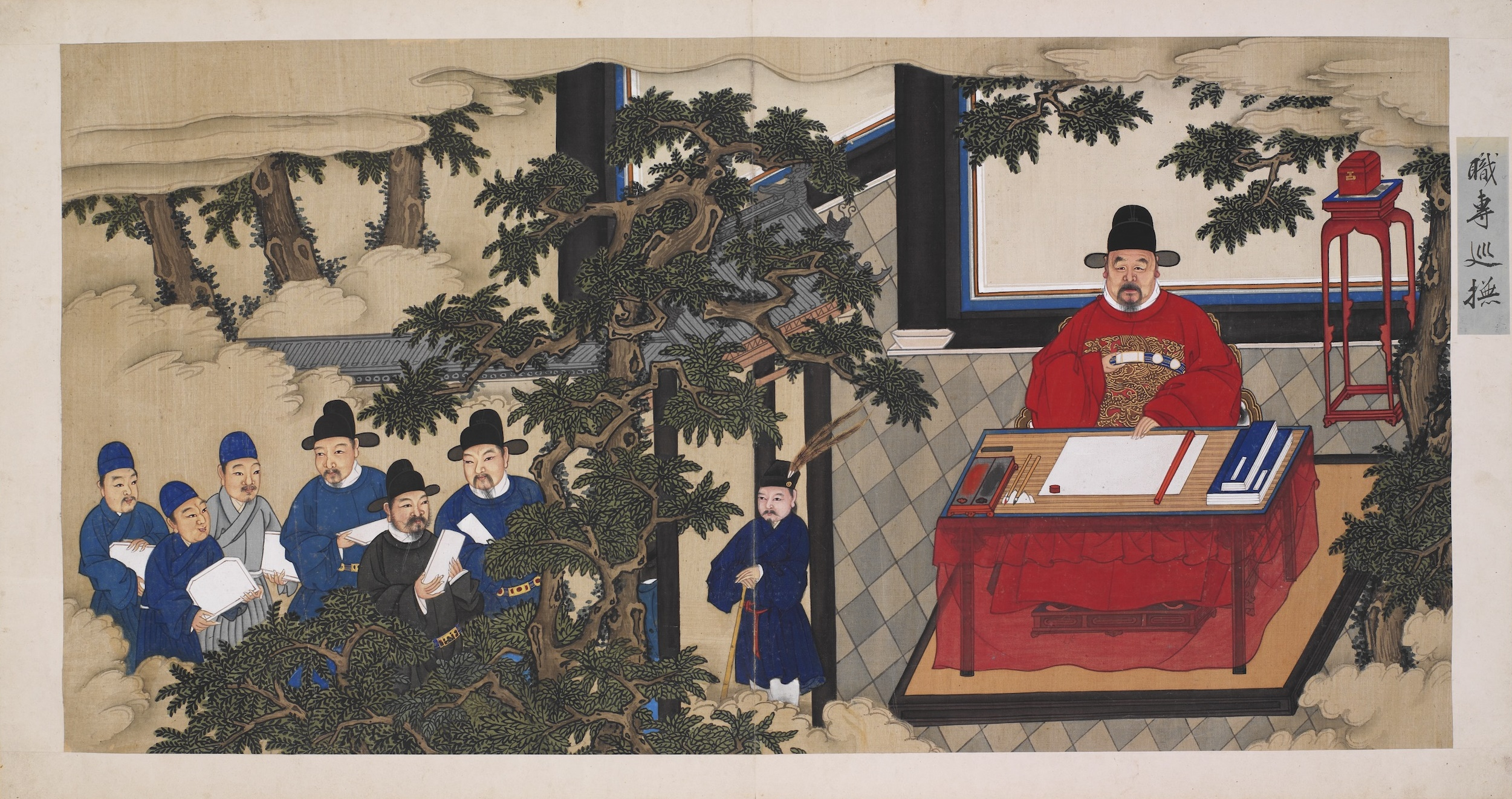
- Painting that depicts the career of a civil servant. The career path starts with passing the civil service examinations (left side) and progresses to a high position in the government (right side).

Chinese name
- Traditional Chinese: 士大夫
Transcriptions
Standard Mandarin
- Hanyu Pinyin: Shìdàfū

Vietnamese name
- Vietnamese alphabet: Sĩ đại phu
- Chữ Hán: 士大夫

Korean name
- Hangul: 사대부
- Hanja: 士大夫
Transcriptions
- Revised Romanization: Sadaebu
- McCune–Reischauer: Sadaebu

Japanese name
- Kanji: 士大夫
- Hiragana: したいふ
Transcriptions
- Revised Hepburn: Shitaifu
- Kunrei-shiki: Sitaihu

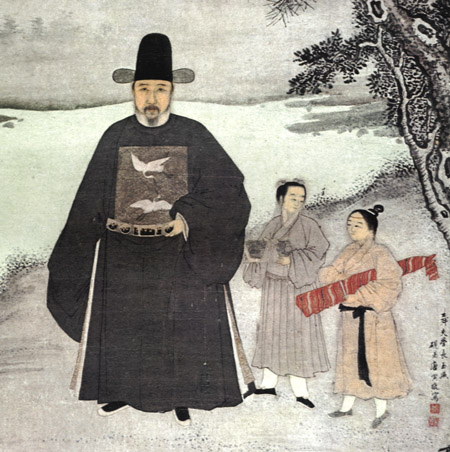
A 15th-century portrait of the Ming official Jiang Shunfu. The decoration of two egrets on his chest are a "mandarin square", indicating that he was a civil official of the sixth rank.

The scholar-officials, also known as literati, scholar-gentlemen or scholar-bureaucrats (Chinese: 士大夫; pinyin: shì dàfū), were government officials and prestigious scholars in Chinese society, forming a distinct social class.

Scholar-officials were politicians and government officials appointed by the emperor of China to perform day-to-day political duties from the Han dynasty to the end of the Qing dynasty in 1912, China's last imperial dynasty. After the Sui dynasty these officials mostly came from the scholar-gentry (紳士, shēnshì) who had earned academic degrees (such as xiucai, juren, or jinshi) by passing the imperial examinations. Scholar-officials were the elite class of imperial China. They were highly educated, especially in literature and the arts, including calligraphy and Confucian texts. They dominated the government administration and local life of China until the early 20th century.

== Origins and formations ==
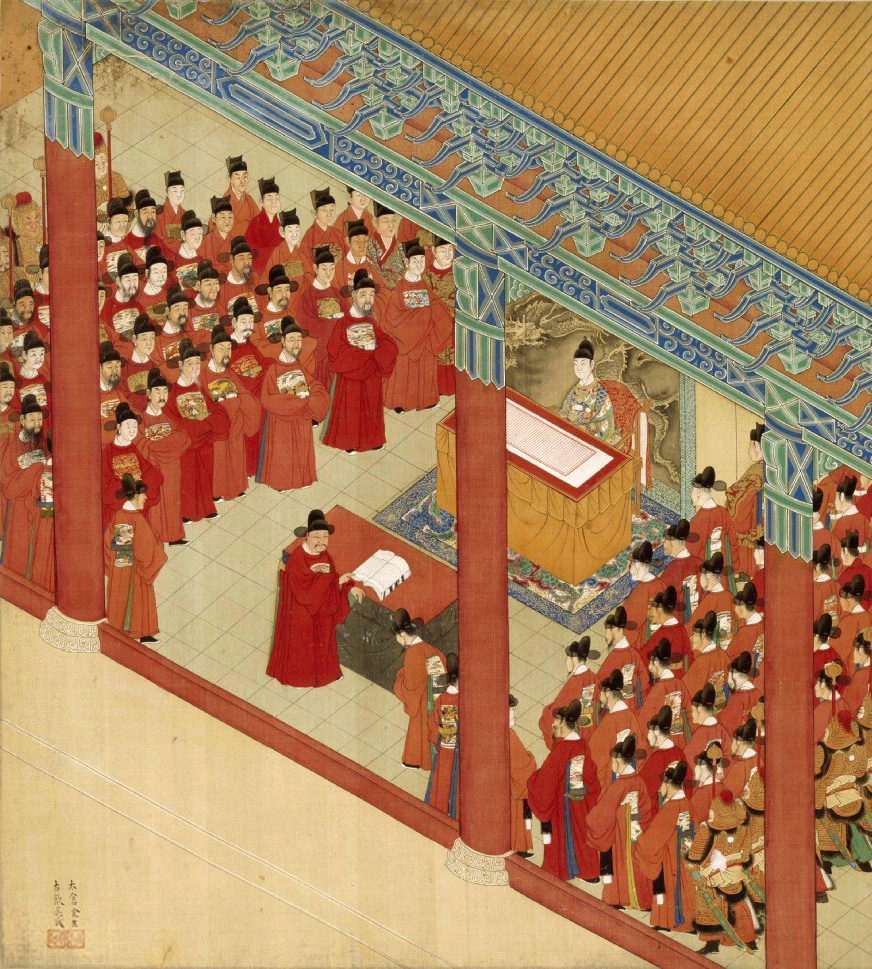
Government officials in Changfu during the Wanli era, Ming dynasty

=== Origins of Shi and Da fu ===
Scholar-official as a concept and social class first appeared during the Warring States period; before that, the Shi and Da Fu were two different classes. During the Western Zhou dynasty, the Duke of Zhou divided the social classes into the king, feudal lords, Da Fu, Shi, ordinary people, and slaves. Da Fu were people from the aristocracy who served as officers and were a higher class than Shi, who were people from the social class between Da Fu and ordinary people and could only serve as low-level officials.

During the Warring States period, with the annexation wars between states and the rise of bureaucracy, many talented individuals from the Shi class provided valuable services to their lords. Shi became more influential and Da Fu gradually evolved into an official position in the bureaucracy, not a hereditary peerage. The Shi and Da Fu gradually merged and became the Scholar-officials (士大夫).

=== Ancient social classes ===
The feudal social structure came to divide ordinary people into four categories, with scholar-officials at its top level, this structure is another important institutional basis of the formation and prosperity of scholar-officials. The order of these Four Occupations were scholar-officials, farmers, artisans, and craftsmen/merchants.

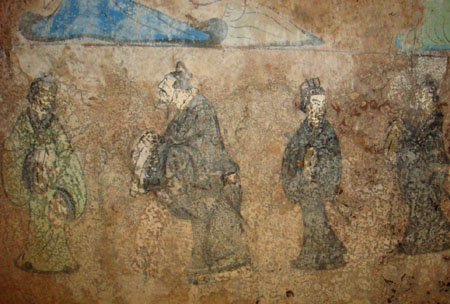
A Western Han fresco depicting Confucius (and Laozi), and his students

=== Interaction with Confucianism ===
Confucianism is the core of traditional Chinese culture and the theoretical basis of the autocratic feudal monarchy. The Confucian school of thought became the mainstream of traditional Chinese society, and Confucian education also became the mainstay of selecting officials at most levels of administration.

Despite the hierarchical tendencies of Confucianism, scholar-officials and ministers are not mere obedient subordinates of the ruler, but theoretically have equal roles in the maintenance of social order. This includes the possibility of running counter against or opposing the ruler, should he prove to be unfit to uphold righteous principles and fail to provide and promote well-being for the people. Thus, the balance of power is ideally split between the meritocratic Confucian scholars and the dynastic emperors, and a ruler should maintain power with the acceptance of their ministers, who have the ultimate right to sanction and forcibly depose a tyrannical or failing ruler.

During the Song and Ming dynasties, Confucian philosophers combined Taoist and Buddhist thought to produce the Neo-Confucian school, further enriching the Confucian ideological system. This directly increased the prosperity of the scholar-official class and also contributed to the unique moral code of the scholar-officials, which had a huge impact on the Chinese literati of later generations.

=== Talent selection systems in Ancient China ===
The traditional Chinese official selection systems are the institutional basis of the formation of scholar-officials.

- Recommendatory system
- Nine-rank system
- Imperial examination

== Developments ==
=== Han to Northern and Southern dynasties (202 BC – 589 AD) ===
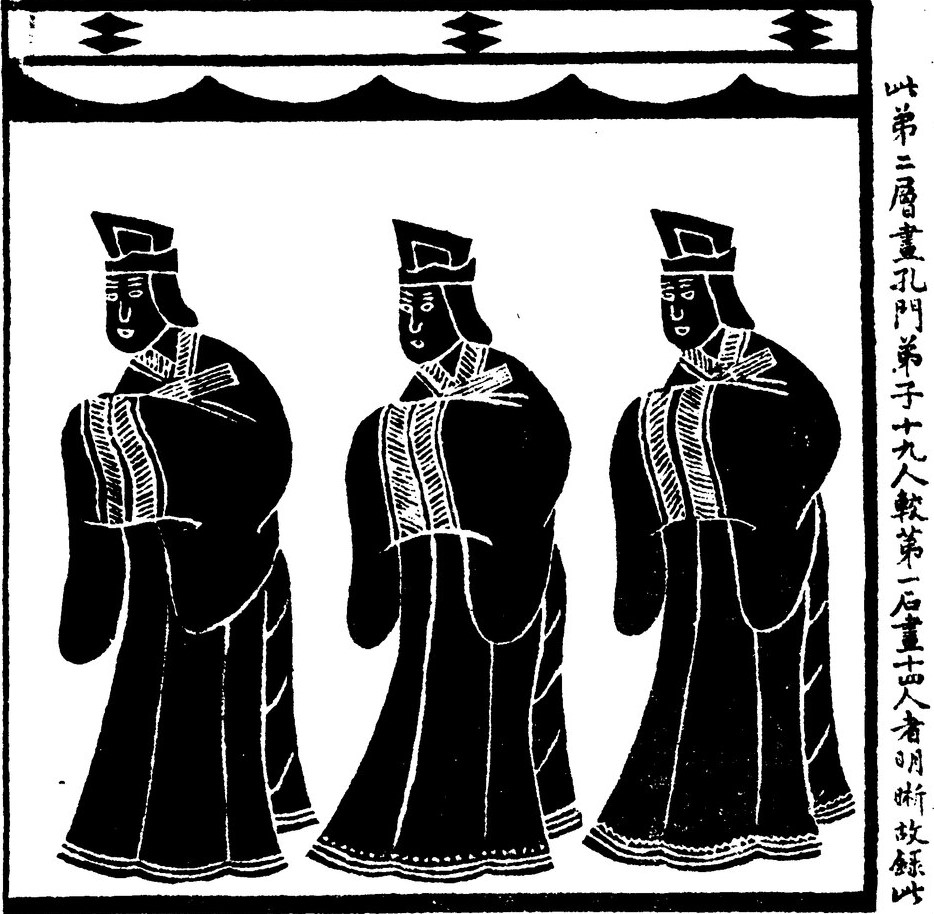
Scholars depicted on Han dynasty pictorial brick, discovered in Chengdu. Scholars wore hats called Jinxian Guan (進賢冠) to denominate educational status.

Using the Recommendatory System and Nine-rank System to select governments officials and candidates were popular during the long period beginning with the Han dynasty and ending after the Northern and Southern dynasties period. Scholars-officials during this period usually from prominent clans, including the Zheng clan of Xingyang, Xie clan of Chen Commandery, Cui clan of Qinghe, Cui clan of Boling, Wang clan of Langya, Wang clan of Taiyuan, and the Lu clan of Fanyang. These clans were prominent in having Confucian scholars and high-ranking government officials, with male family members serving as official for generations and some clans or families serving several chancellors. They formed a huge network through political marriages with each other or the imperial family and also formed a monopoly on education and government officials.

=== Sui and Tang Dynasties (581–907) ===
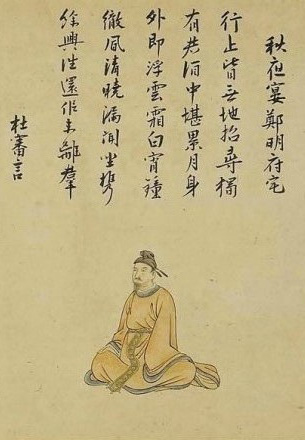
Du Shenyan, a politician and noted poet

Officially established in 587, the Civil Service Examination allowed for selection of scholar-officials. Beginning with the Sui dynasty, those with the right family background who passed this examination would become scholar-officials. In the early part of the Tang dynasty, empress Wu Zetian reformed and improved the Imperial Examination system by establishing the Metropolitan Exam; people who passed it were called Jinshi (metropolitan graduates, highest degree), and people passed the Provincial Exam were called Juren (provincial graduates). Wu's reforms gradually led to today's concept of scholar-officials and the intellectual class. The government would select scholar-officials by examining their poems and essays writings for knowledge of Confucian texts and some Buddhist texts. Intellectuals who passed the exam served as officials. Many famous Tang poets were scholar-officials, such as Du Mu. However, because the Tang Dynasty was a rapidly changing period for the final formation of the structure and composition of scholar-officials, there is some ambiguity of the usage of the words "scholar-officials": according to the Old Book of Tang, scholars/intellectuals who passed the imperial exam but took no official position could only be referred to Shi (士); according to the New Book of Tang, as long as they were scholars, whether official or not, they could be called scholar-officials.

=== Song Dynasty (960–1279) ===
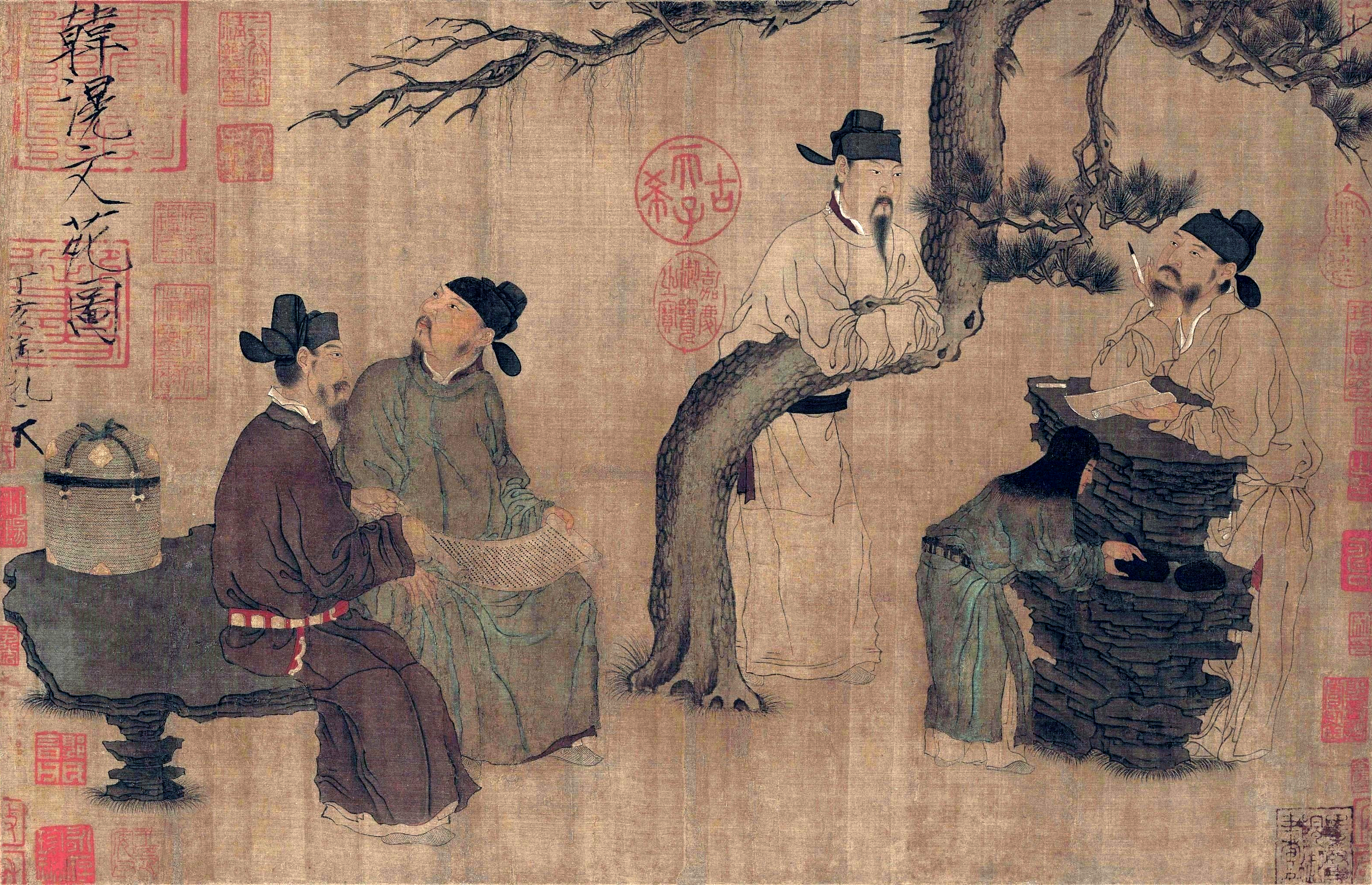
Zhou Wenju's Literary Garden (文苑图), depicting the gathering of poets

The Song dynasty was the golden age for scholar-officials. By this time, passing the Imperial Examination had become the major path for people to hold an official position in the government. With the continuous improvements and reforms of Imperial Examination, the bureaucracy completely replaced the aristocracy, and the scholar-officer's polity was completely established. Song was the only dynasty in Chinese history that provided scholar-officials judicial privilege. Due to the influence of the founding emperor of Song Zhao Kuangyin, almost all Song emperors showed great respect to intellectuals. If a scholar-official from the Song dynasty committed a crime, he could not be held accountable directly. Instead, an internal impeachment replaced the formal judicial process. If his crime was not serious, he only needed to be punished with a reprimand instead of a criminal penalty.

=== Yuan, Ming, and Qing dynasties (1271–1912) ===
Candidates gathering around the wall where the results are posted. This announcement was known as "releasing the roll" (放榜). (c. 1540, by Qiu Ying)

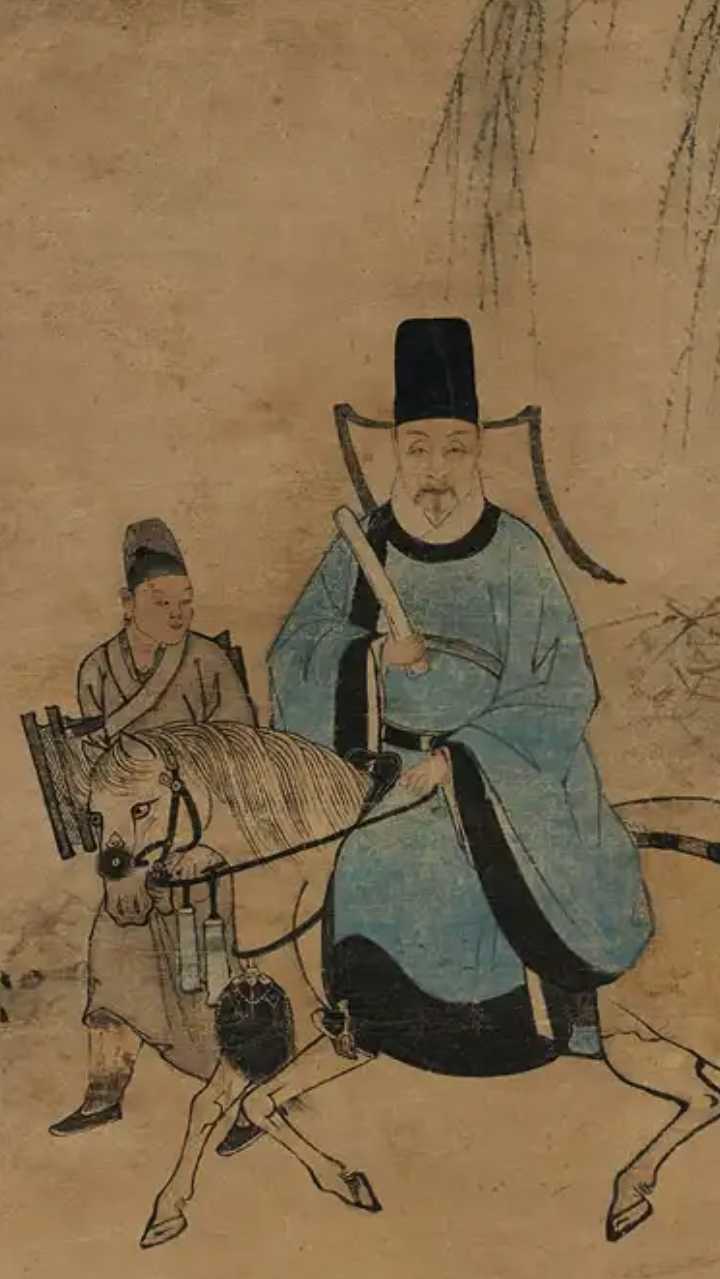
Lanshan (襴衫) worn by scholars and students

During the Yuan, Ming and Qing dynasties, the stereotyped writing style of the eight-legged essay (八股文) format dominated the Imperial Examination, and scholar-officials from this period were relatively unable to speak and create freely due to the harsh political environment. The strong relationship between Imperial Examination and the official position were still present, though the entire society formed a climate of "studying well so as to become an official" (学而优则仕).

In 1905, the Qing government abolished the imperial examination system, leading to the gradual disappearance of scholar-officials.

== Non-governmental functions ==
Since only a select few could become court or local officials, the majority of the scholar-literati stayed in villages or cities as social leaders. The scholar-gentry carried out social welfare measures, taught in private schools, helped negotiate minor legal disputes, supervised community projects, maintained local law and order, conducted Confucian ceremonies, assisted in the government's collection of taxes, and preached Confucian moral teachings. As a class, these scholars claimed to represent morality and virtue. The district magistrate, who by regulation was not allowed to serve in his home district, depended on the local gentry for advice and for carrying out projects, which gave them the power to benefit themselves and their clients.

== Evaluations ==
Theoretically, this system would create a meritocratic ruling class, with the best students running the country. The imperial examinations gave many people the opportunity to pursue political power and honor and thus encouraged serious pursuit of formal education. Since the system did not formally discriminate based on social status, it provided an avenue for upward social mobility. However, even though the examination-based bureaucracy's heavy emphasis on Confucian literature ensured that the most eloquent writers and erudite scholars achieved high positions, the system lacked formal safeguards against political corruption, only the Confucian moral teachings tested by the examinations. Once their political futures were secured by success in the examinations, officials were tempted by corruption and abuse of power.

The Princeton scholar Benjamin Elman writes that some criticized the examination elite as hindering China's development over the last century but that preparing for the examinations trained government officials in a common culture and that "classical examinations were an effective cultural, social, political, and educational construction that met the needs of the dynastic bureaucracy while simultaneously supporting late imperial social structure."

With the development of international influence of Civil Service Examination system in ancient East Asia region, Scholar-officials also became an important social backbone of ancient Korea (include Goguryeo, Silla, and Baekje), Ryukyu Kingdom, and Vietnam.

== See also ==
- Auxiliary academician
- Bildungsbürgertum
- Cabang Atas, the Chinese gentry of colonial Indonesia
- County magistrate, the official in charge of the county
- Four arts
- Junzi
- Kuge
- Landed gentry in China
- Mandarin (bureaucrat)
- Yangban, the Korean form of the scholar-official

== Notes ==
=== Sources ===
- Elman, Benjamin A (2016). "Civil Service Examinations Kējǔ 科举" (PDF). In Cheng, Linsun (ed.). Berkshire Encyclopedia of China. pp. 405–410. doi:10.1093/acref/9780190622671.001.0001. ISBN 978-0-9770159-4-8.
- Li, Su (2018). "Scholar-Officials". In Li, Su; Ryden, Edmund (eds.). The Constitution of Ancient China. Princeton University Press. pp. 98–138. ISBN 978-0-691-17159-3. JSTOR j.ctt20fw8c6.8.
- Liu, Bo (2014). "The Multivalent Imagery of the Ox in Song Painting". Journal of Song-Yuan Studies. 44: 33–84. doi:10.1353/sys.2014.0015. JSTOR 44511239.
- Zhang, Dewei (2020). "Scholar-Officials: Struggling for the Right Position". Thriving in Crisis: Buddhism and Political Disruption in China, 1522–1620. Columbia University Press. pp. 119–155. doi:10.7312/zhan19700. ISBN 978-0-231-19700-7. JSTOR 10.7312/zhan19700.13.
- Wang, Rui (2008). Wu Zetian's Contribution to the Cultural Development of the Tang Dynasty (PDF) (Thesis). ISBN 978-0-494-44981-3. OCLC 696906426.
