= Chunwang (poem) =

Poem by Du Fu

"Chunwang" (Chinese: 春望; pinyin: Chūnwàng) is a poem by Tang dynasty poet Du Fu, written after the fall of Chang'an to rebel forces led by An Lushan, as part of the civil war that began in 755. Literary critics have recognised it as one of Du's best and best-known works.

== Background ==
Du Fu was a Chinese poet who was active in the Tang dynasty. In 755, during the reign of Emperor Xuanzong, Du was in the capital city of Chang'an (present-day Xi'an) when the An Lushan Rebellion began. "Chunwang" was written in 757, nine months after the fall of Chang'an to An's army. Its title comprises the Chinese characters for "spring" ("chun" or 春) and "looking into the distance" ("wang" or 望). In the poem, Du laments the rapid defeat of the imperial forces and what, to his mind, signals the end of the Tang dynasty.

== Text and form ==
國 破 山 河 在
城 春 草 木 深
感 時 花 濺 淚
恨 別 鳥 驚 心
烽 火 連 三 月
家 書 抵 萬 金
白 頭 搔 更 短
渾 欲 不 勝 簪

(Traditional)

国 破 山 河 在
城 春 草 木 深
感 时 花 溅 泪
恨 别 鸟 惊 心
烽 火 连 三 月
家 书 抵 万 金
白 头 搔 更 短
浑 欲 不 胜 簪

(Simplified)

guó pò shān hé zài
chéng chūn cǎo mù shēn
gǎn shí huā jiàn lèi
hèn bié niǎo jīng xīn
fēng huǒ lián sān yuè
jiā shū dǐ wàn jīn
bái tóu sāo gèng duǎn
hún yù bù shèng zān

(Pinyin)

A kingdom smashed, its hills and rivers still here,
spring in the city, plants and trees grow deep.

Moved by the moment, flowers splash with tears,
alarmed at parting, birds startle the heart.

War's beacon fires have gone on three months,
letters from home are worth thousands in gold.

Fingers run through white hair until it thins,
cap-pins (Note: Until the seventeenth century, Chinese people "dressed their hair in a top-knot on the crown of the head", with the top-knot being held in place by a pin that passed through it. David Hawkes translates this couplet thus: "My white hair is getting so scanty from worried scratching that soon enough there won't be enough to stick my hatpin in!") will almost no longer hold.

— Du Fu (translated by Stephen Owen)

"Chunwang" is an example of what was known in the Tang dynasty as wuyan lüshi (五言律詩), (Note: Zong-Qi Cai described the poem as "pentasyllabic regulated verse", while Arthur Cooper likened it to a "Chinese sonnet".) a genre known for its strict and complex structural rules. The poem is made up of eight lines consisting of five characters each, creating four couplets, with the second and third couplets containing parallelism. For instance, the verbs meaning "feel" and "hate" are paired together, as are the nouns for "bird" and "flower". There is also a change of grammatical construction: the subjects of the second couplet ("bird" and "flower") appear in the middle of each line, whereas those of the third couplet ("beacon fire" and "letter from home") appear in the beginning of each line.

However, the poem's exact rhyme scheme is unclear because the pronunciation of classical Chinese characters using pinyin (a modern transliteration system introduced in the 1950s) is distinct from what they would have sounded like in the Tang dynasty. 21st-century Chinese literary critic Zong-Qi Cai posited that the poem follows a "conventional" ABCB DBEB pattern.

== Legacy ==
According to Timothy Wai Keung Chan, "Chunwang" is "one of Du Fu's most famous poems". Alice Su of The Economist described it as "one of the greatest poems in the Chinese literary canon", while Zong-Qi Cai called it one of the best-known and most commonly recited Chinese poems.

In Matsuo Bashō's Oku no Hosomichi (1689), the opening lines of "Chunwang" are subverted to instead highlight the "instability of the nonhuman world and the resilience ... of poetry itself". The opening scene of Fei Mu's Spring in a Small Town (1948) is, according to film critic Jie Li, patterned after "Chunwang".

== Translation ==
French translator Nicolas Chapuis remarked that "Chunwang" is "seemingly very simple but is one of the hardest poems to translate". Similarly, British translator David Hawkes observed that the poem's "perfection of form lends it a classical grace which unfortunately cannot be communicated in translation". Still, "Chunwang" has been translated into English multiple times, under titles as "Gazing in Spring", "Spring Prospect", "Spring Scene", "The View in Spring", and so forth. Fifty-six translations have been gathered and reprinted online by Ray Brownrigg.

American translator Burton Raffel considered "Chunwang" to be an appropriate case study of the "outer limits of syntactical translatability". In particular, he wrote that Nee Wen-yei's "obviously half-desperate" translation "ruined the poetry" by contriving a "tense structure" while trivialising the "poignant wry humour" of the final two lines. Raffel also criticised Arthur Cooper for his "exceedingly lame attempt to employ English meter and rhyme and even English quatrains". However, Raffel complimented C. K. Kwock and Vincent McHugh's translation, which he thought "echoed not only the structure but also the bite and passion of the Chinese original."
