= The Selected Poems of Du Fu =

The Selected Poems of Du Fu is a collection of English translations of Chinese poetry by the Tang dynasty poet Du Fu, translated by Burton Watson. Published in 2002, the book includes an introduction to the poet and his work and an extensive bibliography. Watson's translations are notable for conveying Du Fu's use of verbal parallelism, and include extensive annotations to explain the mythological and historical allusions in the poems.
