= Du Fu Thatched Cottage =

Park and museum in Chengdu

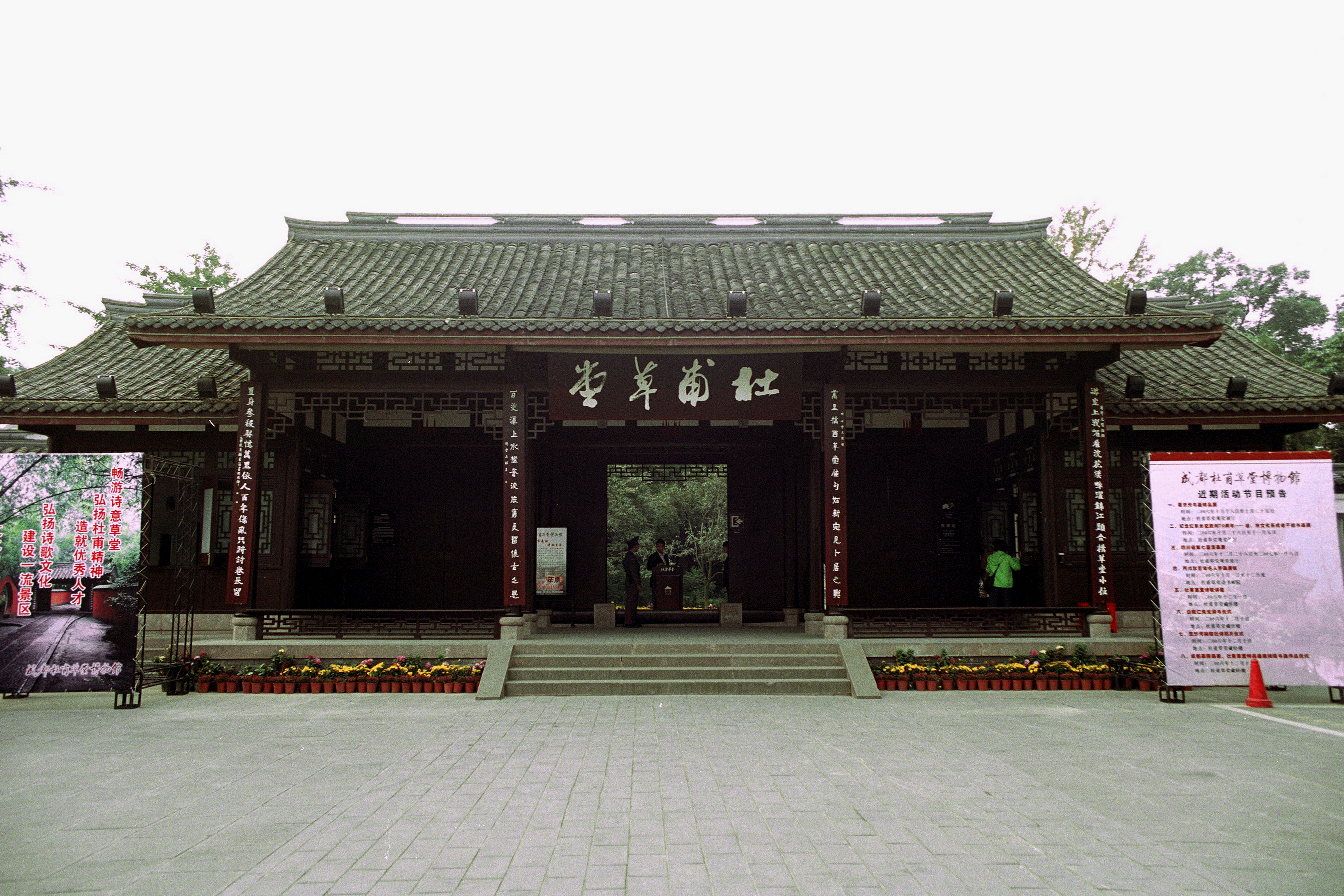
- Entrance gate of Du Fu Thatched Cottage

- Location within Sichuan Location within China
- Location: Chengdu, Sichuan, China
- Coordinates: 30°39′46″N 104°01′34″E
- Website: Du Fu Thatched Cottage Museum website

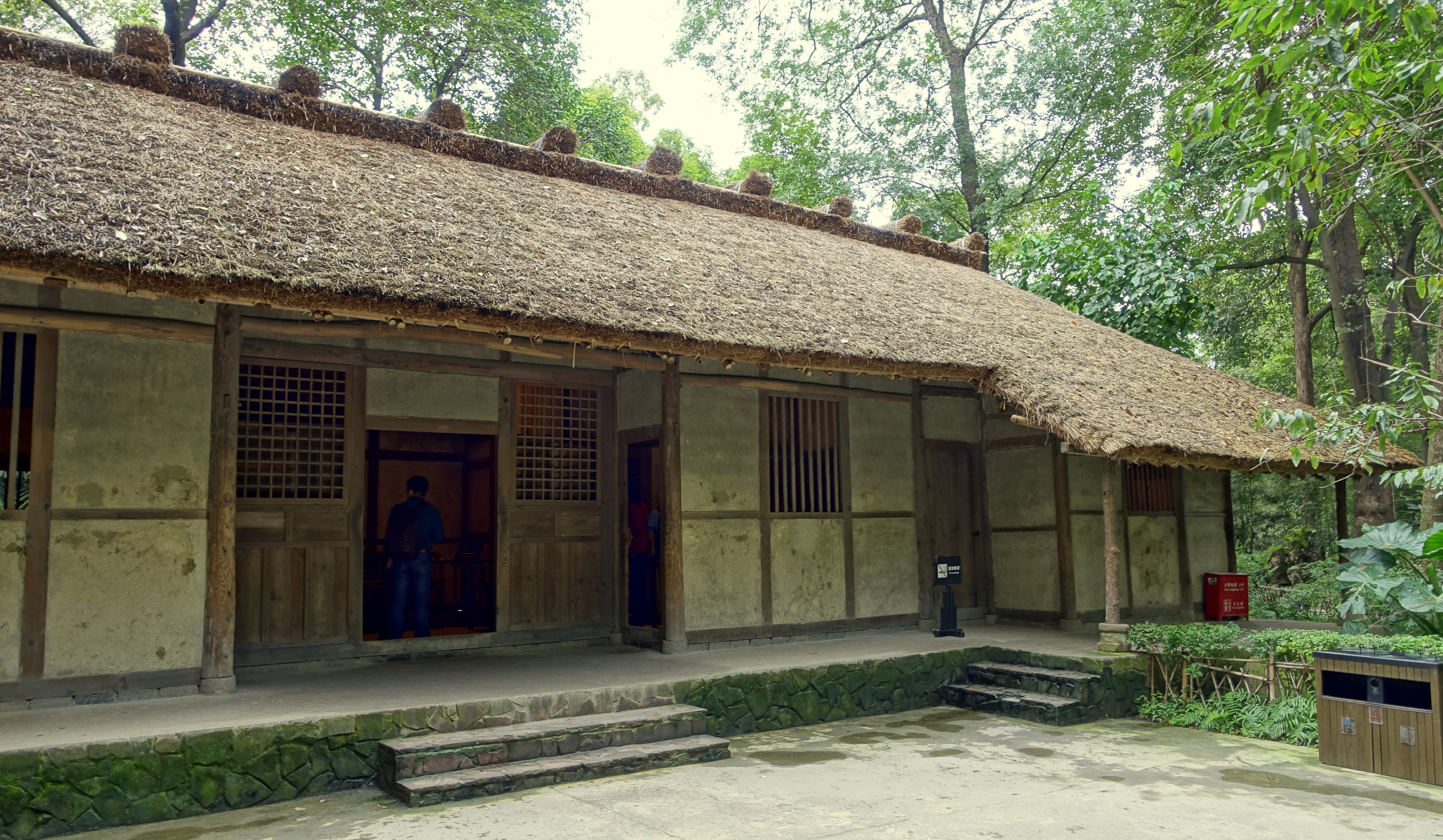
Du's reconstructed cottage

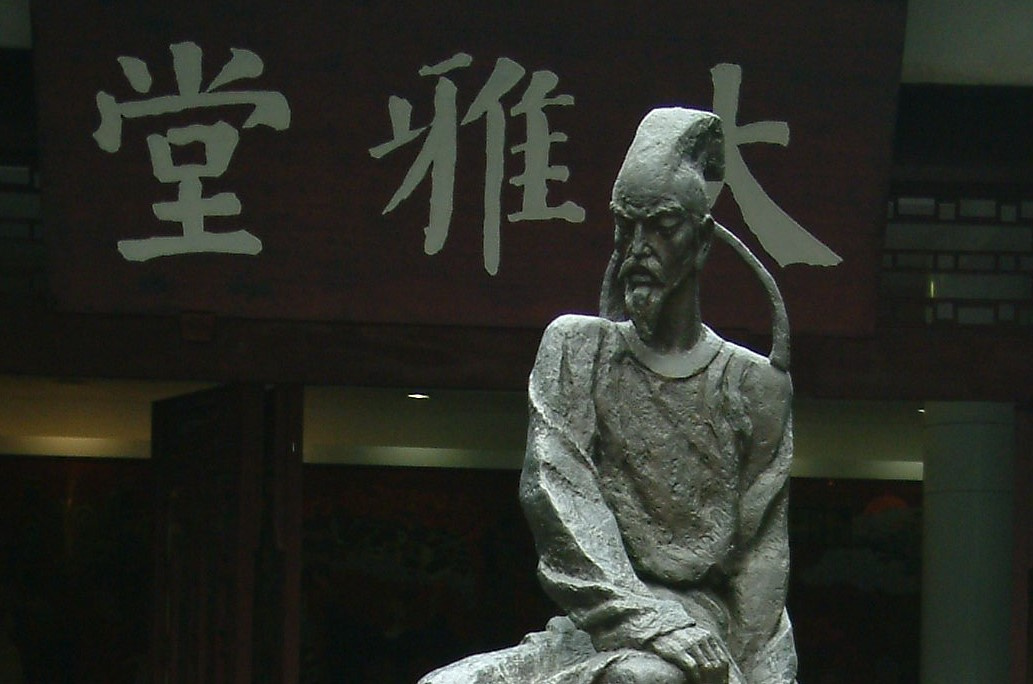
A bronze sculpture of Du in front of the Hall of Great Poets.

Du Fu Thatched Cottage (Chinese: 杜甫草堂; pinyin: Dù Fǔ Cǎotáng) is a 24-acre (97,000 m^{2}) park and museum in honour of the Tang dynasty poet Du Fu at the western outskirts of Chengdu, adjacent to the Huanhua Xi (Flower Rinsing Creek). In 1961 the Chinese government made the cottage a National Heritage site.

== History ==
In 759 Du Fu moved to Chengdu, built a thatched hut near the Flower Rinsing Creek and lived there for four years. The "thatched hut" period was the peak of Du's creativity, during which he wrote 240 poems, among them "My Thatched Hut was torn apart by Autumn Gales" and "The Prime Minister of Shu".

Du Fu Thatched Cottage is now a popular destination for Du enthusiasts around the world to pay tribute to the poet.

Many rich families in ancient China donated money for decades to keep this cottage in its best state; being able to donate money was also a sign of wealth and power back then. The donator's name is usually carved on a wall next to the cottage, in order to thank them for this deed. One of the families known to donate money is a branch of the Zhang family, which ruled part of Hubei at the time.

== Museum ==
The original thatched hut built by Du was destroyed. Key buildings in the surrounding park were constructed in the early 16th century during the Ming dynasty and extensively renovated in 1811 during the Qing dynasty.

Du Fu Thatched Cottage consists of several areas:

- Du Gongbu Memorial Hall (工部祠; Gōngbù Cí), where Du's life and work was displayed, the library area displayed Du's published works, including some rare Song dynasty wood carving editions. The foreign-language section displays a large number of foreign language books of Du's works.
- Du's thatched cottage. A reconstructed thatched hut partitioned into a study, a bedroom and kitchen, recreating the living and working environment of Du's time.
- The Hall of Great Poets (大雅堂; Dàyǎ Táng). An exhibition hall with a 16-meter-long (52 ft) by 4-meter-tall (13 ft) mural painting portraying scenes from Du's poems: "My Thatched Hut Wrecked by the Autumn Wind" and "A Song of War Chariots". There are also statues of twelve prominent Chinese poets (including Qu Yuan, Tao Qian, Li Bai, Wang Wei, Su Shi, Li Qingzhao, Lu You) on display.

== Gallery ==
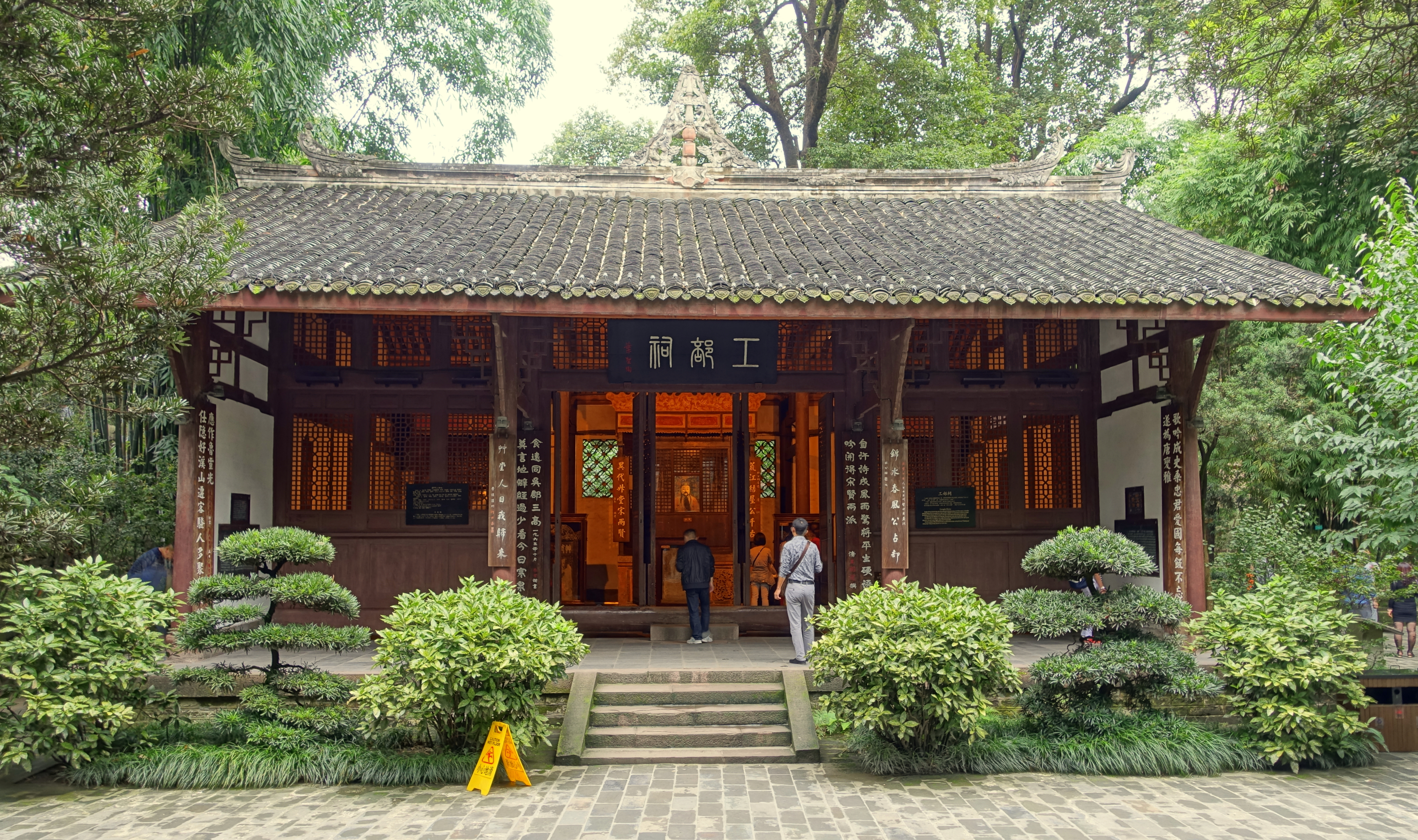
Gongbu Shrine in the cottage

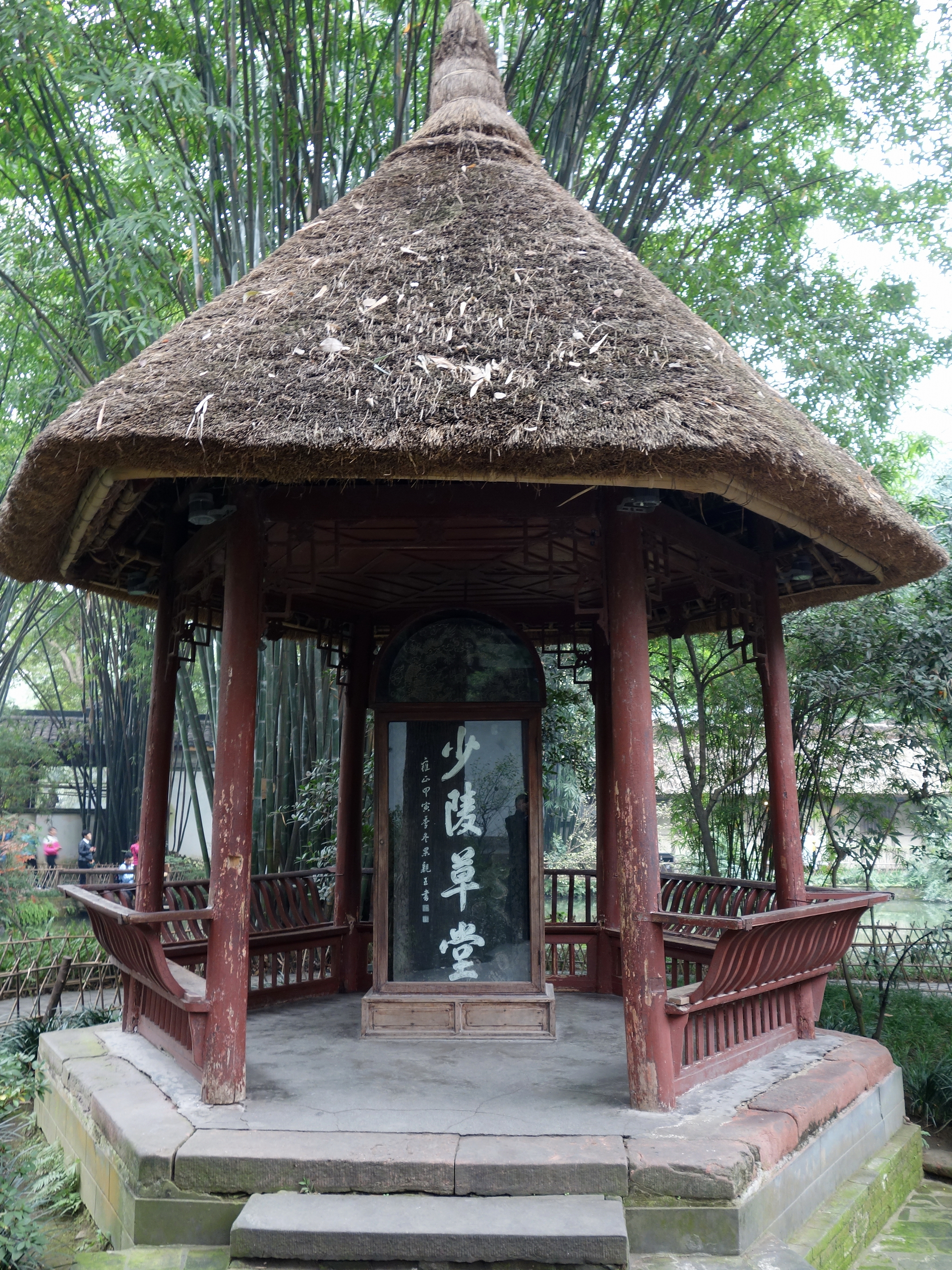
Shaoling Thatched Cottage Tablet Pavilion

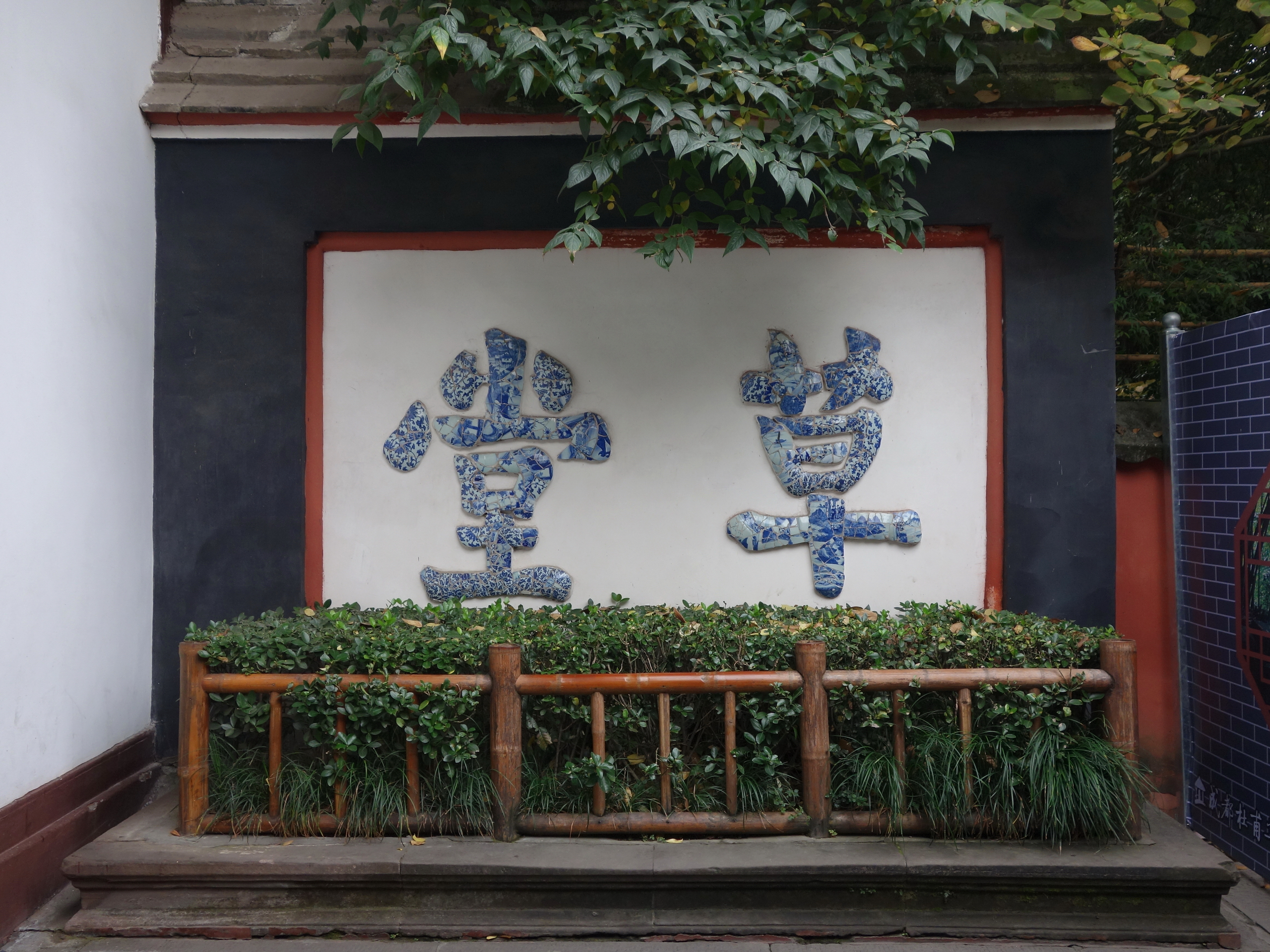

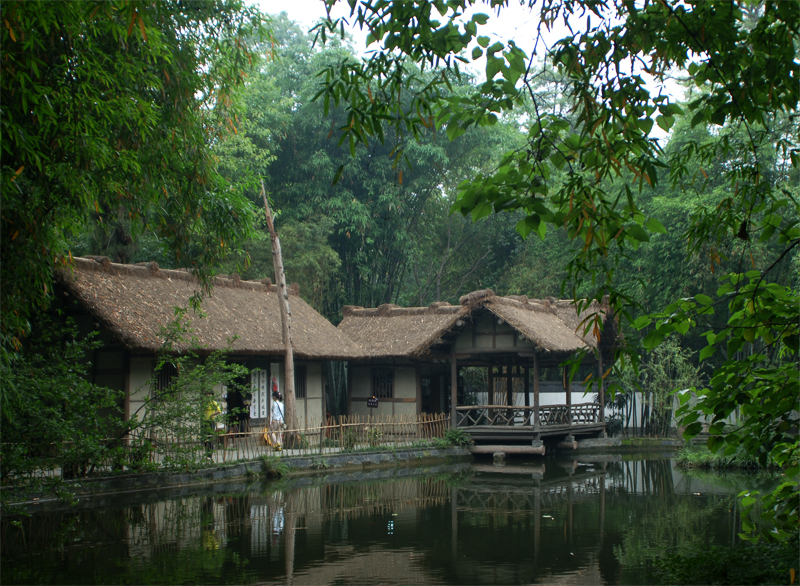

== See also ==
- Chinese architecture
- Kuizhou, further location of Du thatched cottage(s)
- List of museums
- Museums in China
