= Keith Holyoak =

American psychologist and poet (born 1950)

Keith James Holyoak
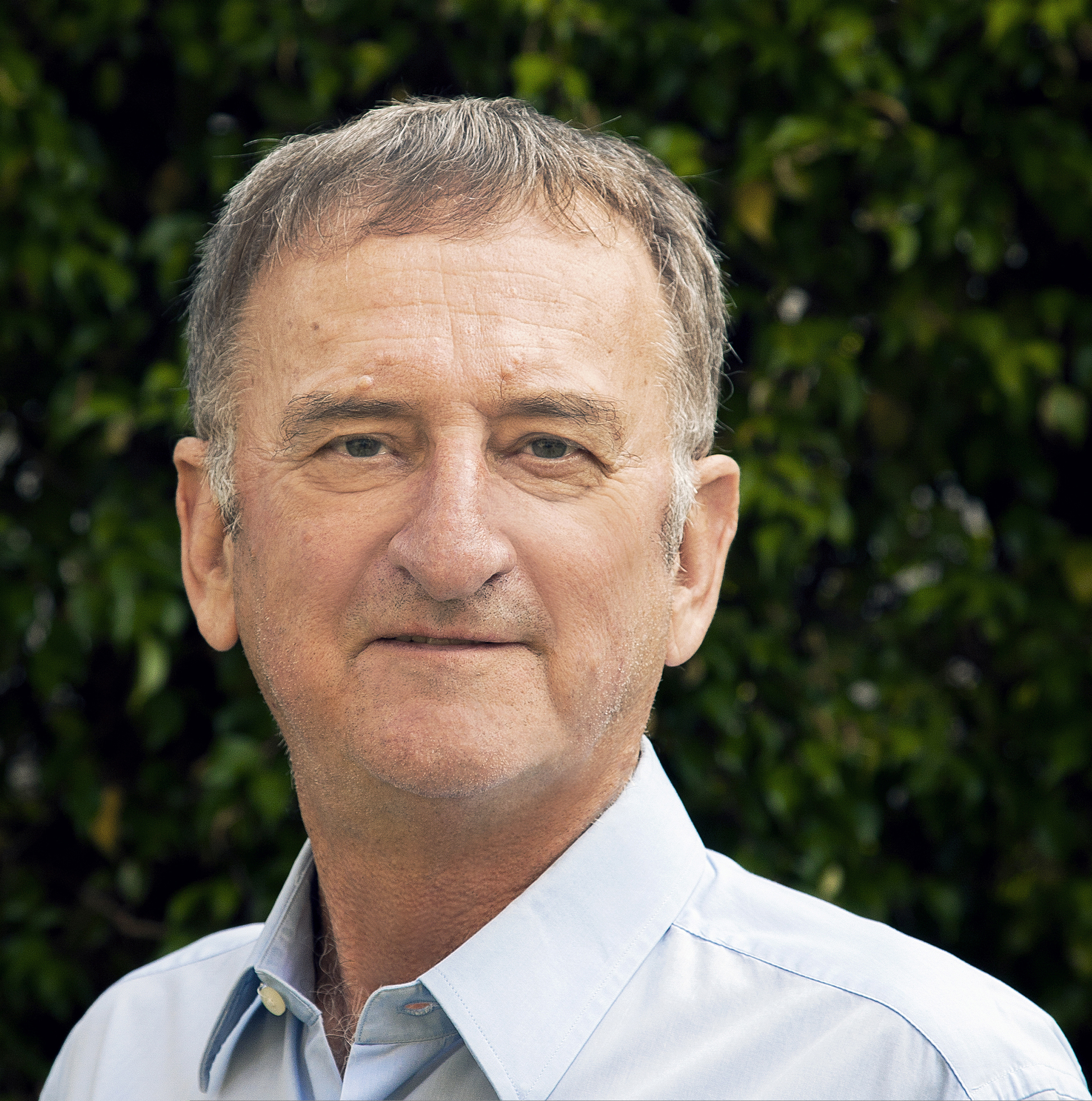
- Keith Holyoak
- Born: January 16, 1950 (age 76); Langley, British Columbia, Canada
- Citizenship: Canadian–American
- Education: University of British Columbia (BA); Stanford University (PhD)
- Scientific career
- Fields: Cognitive science
- Doctoral advisor: Gordon H. Bower

Keith James Holyoak (born January 16, 1950) is a Canadian–American researcher in cognitive psychology and cognitive science, working on human thinking and reasoning. Holyoak's work focuses on the role of analogy in thinking. His work showed how analogy can be used to enhance learning of new abstract concepts by both children and adults, as well as how reasoning breaks down in cases of brain damage.

Holyoak is also a poet. He has published four collections of his own poems, My Minotaur, Foreigner, The Gospel According to Judas, and Oracle Bones, as well as a collection of translations of classical Chinese poetry by Li Bai and Du Fu, Facing the Moon.

== Biography ==
Holyoak was born in Langley, British Columbia, Canada, in 1950. He received his B.A. in psychology from the University of British Columbia in 1971, and his PhD in psychology from Stanford University in 1976. His doctoral advisor was Gordon Bower.

He was on the faculty of the University of Michigan from 1976 to 1986, and then joined the faculty of the University of California, Los Angeles, where he is a Distinguished Professor of Psychology.

He served as Chair of the Governing Board of the Cognitive Science Society (1994–95) and Editor of the journals Cognitive Psychology (1995–99) and Psychological Review (2016–2021). Holyoak is a member of the American Academy of Arts and Sciences. He received a Fellowship from the John Simon Guggenheim Memorial Foundation in 1991, and a James McKeen Cattell Fellowship in 1999. He is a Fellow of the American Association for the Advancement of Science, Association for Psychological Science, the Cognitive Science Society, and the Society of Experimental Psychologists (SEP). In 2022 the SEP awarded him the Howard Crosby Warren Medal.

== Research ==
Holyoak's research examines how people use relational knowledge to reason, particularly through analogy, in which they apply knowledge from one situation to another based on underlying structural similarities.

In early studies with Mary L. Gick, Holyoak demonstrated that people can retrieve analogies from memory, apply them to unfamiliar problems and develop abstract problem-solving schemas from specific examples.Holyoak's work influenced research on reasoning, learning, and education. He argued that analogical reasoning is guided by goals and that effective analogies often depend on shared causal relationships. Drawing on Mary Hesse's work on material analogy, Holyoak developed a pragmatic account of analogical reasoning. With Paul Thagard, he formulated the multiconstraint theory, which explains analogy through the interaction of structural, semantic, and pragmatic factors.

He has also studied the neural underpinnings of relational reasoning, especially the prefrontal cortex's role in analogy and abstract thought. Drawing on his background as a poet, he has explored links between analogy and literary symbolism.

== Books and recordings ==
=== Cognitive science ===
- Holyoak, K. J. (2019). The Spider’s Thread: Metaphor in Mind, Brain, and Poetry. Cambridge, Massachusetts: MIT Press, ISBN 978-0-26-203922-2.
- Holland, J.H., Holyoak, K.J., Nisbett, R.E., & Thagard, P. (1986). Induction: Processes of Inference, Learning, and Discovery. Cambridge, Massachusetts: MIT Press, ISBN 0-262-58096-9.
- Holyoak, K.J., & Thagard, P. (1995). Mental Leaps: Analogy in Creative Thought. Cambridge, Massachusetts, MIT Press, ISBN 0-262-58144-2.
- Gentner, D., Holyoak, K.J., & Kokinov, B. (Eds.) (2001). The Analogical Mind: Perspectives from Cognitive Science. Cambridge, Massachusetts: MIT Press, ISBN 0-262-57139-0
- Holyoak, K.J., & Morrison, R.G. (Eds.) (2005). The Cambridge Handbook of Thinking and Reasoning. Cambridge, UK: Cambridge University Press, ISBN 0-521-53101-2
- Holyoak, K.J., & Morrison, R.G. (Eds.) (2012). The Oxford Handbook of Thinking and Reasoning. New York, NY: Oxford University Press, ISBN 978-0-19-973468-9

=== Poetry ===
- Holyoak, K. (2019). Oracle Bones: Poems from the Time of Misrule.. Seattle, WA: [Goldfish Press], ISBN 978-0-9787975-2-2.
- Holyoak, K. (2015). The Gospel According to Judas. Loveland, OH: Dos Madres Press, ISBN 978-1-939929-30-3.
- Holyoak, K. (2012). Foreigner: New English Poems in Chinese Old Style. Loveland, OH: Dos Madres Press, ISBN 978-1-933675-77-0.
- Holyoak, K. (2010). My Minotaur: Selected Poems 1998–2006. Loveland, OH: Dos Madres Press, ISBN 978-1-933675-48-0.
- Holyoak, K. (translator) (2007). Facing the Moon: Poems of Li Bai and Du Fu. Durham, NH: Oyster River Press, ISBN 978-1-882291-04-5.
- Keith Holyoak's Descent. Broken Electric Records (2006).
- Poems of Li Bai. Broken Electric Records (2007).
- Poems of Du Fu. Broken Electric Records (2009).

== Selected publications ==
- Mental leaps: Analogy in creative thought.
- Analogical problem solving
- Schema induction and analogical transfer
- Induction: Processes of Inference, Learning, and Discovery
- Pragmatic reasoning schemas
- Analogical mapping by constraint satisfaction
