= Facing the Moon =

Facing the Moon: Poems of Li Bai and Du Fu is a collection of English translations of Chinese poetry by the Tang dynasty poets Li Bai and Du Fu, translated by Keith Holyoak. Published in 2007, this bilingual collection includes an introduction to the poets and their work, and a bibliography. Holyoak's translations endeavor to capture key elements of the structure of the original poems, including their metric form and rhyme scheme.
