= Gidō Shūshin =

Japanese monk and writer

- Title: Priest

Personal life
- Born: 1325 Japan
- Died: 1388 (aged 62–63)

Religious life
- Religion: Zen Buddhism
- School: Rinzai

Gidō Shūshin (義堂 周信); 1325–1388), Japanese luminary of the Zen Rinzai sect, was a master of poetry and prose in Chinese (Literature of the Five Mountains). Gidō's own diary (Kuge Nikkushū (空華日工集)) relates how as a child he discovered and treasured the Zen classic Rinzairoku in his father's library. He was born in Tosa on the island of Shikoku and began formal study of Confucian and Buddhist literature. His religious proclivities were encouraged when he witnessed the violent death of a clan member. Like many others he took his first vows on Mt. Hiei near the capital. Gidō's life was changed with a visit to the prominent Zen master Musō Soseki (1275–1351) in 1341. He would become the master's attendant after his own unsuccessful pilgrimage to China. He would become a principal disciple. Gidō was born with eyesight difficulties. His choice of a literary name was Kūgedojin or Holy Man who sees Flowers in the Sky. Kūge was from Sanscrit khpuspa and indicated illusory sense perceptions. Gidō would play a role of conciliator between rival courts in the nation's civil war. His loyalty was with the northern court and its Ashikaga supporters. After taking residence in the city of Kamakura, Gidō would become the personal advisor to the Ashikaga rulers there. Gidō encouraged Confucian political values such as centralized rule and social stability. Likewise Gidō became an advocate of Sung period Chinese Neo-Confucian humanistic values, both political and literary. In 1380 Gidō was asked by the reigning shōgun, Yoshimitsu (1358–1408), to reside with him in Kyoto. Gidō's last years were spent personally instructing Yoshimitsu in Confucian and Buddhist subjects.

== Articles ==
- Carpenter, Bruce E., ‘The Poems of Saint Gidō’, Tezukayama University Review (Tezukayama daigaku ronshū), Nara, Japan, no. 21, 1978, pp. 1–12. ISSN 0385-7743
- Carpenter, Bruce E., ‘A Biography of Gidō Shūshin’, Tezukayama University Review (Tezukayama daigaku ronshū), Nara, Japan, no. 45, 1984, pp. 1–19. ISSN 0385-7743

== Translations ==
- Carpenter, Bruce E., ‘Poetry and Prose of Gidō Shūshin’, Bulletin of Tezukayama University (Tezukayama daigaku kiyo), Nara, Japan, no. 24, 1987, pp. 18–76.
