= Literature of the Five Mountains =

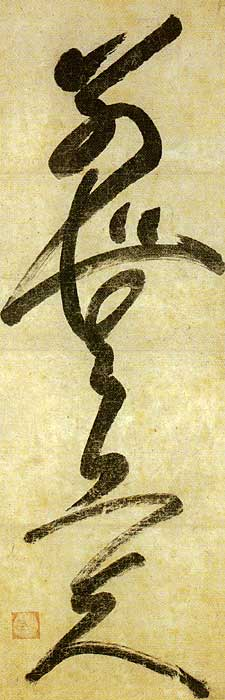
Calligraphy of Five Mountains Patriarch Musō Soseki

The Gozan Bungaku or literature of the Five Mountains (Japanese: 五山文学) is the literature produced by the principal Zen (禅) monastic centers of in Kyoto and Kamakura, Japan. The term also refers to five Zen centers in China in Hangzhou and Ningbo that inspired zen in Japan, while the term "mountain" refers to Buddhist monastery.

Five Mountains literature or gozan bungaku (五山文學) is used collectively to refer to the poetry and prose in Chinese produced by Japanese monks who were active mostly during the 14th and 15th centuries. Notable writers of the genre include Musō Soseki, Ikkyū Sōjun, Zekkai Chūsin (絶海中津), Sesson Yūbai, Gidō Shūshin, Jakushitsu Genkō, Chūgan Engetsu and Kokan Shiren. Also included are works by Chinese monks residing in Japan such as Seisetsu Shōchō (Qingzhuo Zhengcheng) and Jikusen Bonsen (竺仙梵僊, Zhuxian Fanxian)

== History ==
The literary movement has its origin in the 13th century, influenced by two Chinese monks. The first of them, Yishan Yining, arrived in Japan in 1299 as a Yuan emissary and wrote in the Zen literary style of the Southern Song dynasty. Among his students were Kokan Shiren and Sesson Yūbai. Another monk from the early Yuan, Kurin Seimu (古林清茂, Gulin Qingmao) was a member of the Rinzai school who initiated a different Zen style in China. Gulin never went to Japan but was nevertheless influential in the country through his Chinese and Japanese students, including Seisetsu Shōchō, Jikusen Bonsen and Sesson Yūbai.

Gozan bungaku literature may be divided into two broad periods, the first from the beginning to the late 14th century, the second from the late 14th century to its decline. Others however subdivided them into the following four periods:

1. Growth (1279–1330) – A representative of the poets of this early period is Sesson Yūbai, a student of Yishan Yining and who wrote in an "Ancient" style.
2. Peak (1330–1386) – Examples are Gidō Shūshin and Zekkai Chūsin, who were students of Musō Soseki and wrote in regulated verse forms.
3. Full maturity (1386–1467) – This period saw the greatest extent of the Gozan monastic system, examples of writers in this period include Kōzei Ryūha and Ikkyū.
4. Decline (1467–1615) – The start of the Ōnin War marked the decline when the great temples of Kyoto were destroyed and their monks scattered. This scattering of the monks however also helped to spread Gozan influence in poetry, painting, garden design throughout Japan.

== Style ==
The literature of the Five Mountains highly prized a sense of humor and sympathy with life’s ordinariness. A Five Mountains poet might write about anything, in contrast to the prescribed themes of the aristocratic court poets. Kokan Shiren (d. 1346) for example would write about a mosquito.

Snouts sharp as drill bits!

Buzz like thunder as they circle the room.
They sneak through the folds of my robe,

But they could bloody the back of an ox made of iron!

The image in the final line of Mosquitoes reminds the reader of one of the custom in Zen establishments of slapping on the head with a stick those practitioners of meditation who have momentarily dozed off. In contrast, a courtier might write about the cicada and celebrate seasonal associations connected to them. To write about the mosquito would violate the courtier’s strict sense of literary decorum.

In a poem entitled "Sailing in the Moonlight", Kokan focuses on the incongruous humor of life.

We monks boat in moonlight, circle through the reeds.

The boatman shouts the tide recedes; we must return.
The village folk mistake us for a fishing boat

And scramble to the beach to buy our catch.

Five Mountains literature was not entirely concerned with the rustic cloistered world. Often the principal historical events of the day found their way into the works of the monks. Zen clerics themselves often served as advisers to the leading political figures. In a poem, "Written Suddenly While Feeling Remorse Over the Passage of Time" Chugan Engetsu (d. 1375) relates his feelings about the fall of the Kamakura shogunate a year earlier.

A year ago today the Kamakura fell.

In the monasteries now, nothing of the old mood remains.
The peddler girl understands nothing of a monk's remorse-

Shouting through the streets, selling firewood, selling vegetables.

== See also ==
- Five Mountain System
