= Auxiliary academician =

- Traditional Chinese: 直學士
- Simplified Chinese: 直学士
Transcriptions
Standard Mandarin
- Hanyu Pinyin: Zhíxuéshì

Auxiliary academicians or Zhixueshi were official positions from the Tang dynasty (618–907), Liao dynasty (907–1125), Song dynasty (960–1279) and the early years of Ming dynasty (1368–1644). It was discontinued in 1381. They were editors, usually also holding nominal positions elsewhere, that were working for:

- Tang dynasty: Academy of Scholarly Worthies, Institute for the Advancement of Literature
- Song dynasty: Bureau of Military Affairs, Academy of Scholarly Worthies, Institute for the Glorification of Literature, and Institute of Academicians
- Liao dynasty: Institute for the Glorification of Literature, Institute for the Veneration of Literature
- Ming dynasty: Hanlin Academy

The position is relatively high in the imperial hierarchy during the Song dynasty.
