= Burton Watson =

American sinologist, translator, and writer (1925–2017)

- Born: June 13, 1925; New Rochelle, New York, United States
- Died: April 1, 2017 (aged 91); Kamagaya, Japan
- Education: Columbia University (BA, MA, PhD)
- Occupations: Sinologist; translator; writer

Chinese name
- Traditional Chinese: 華茲生
- Simplified Chinese: 华兹生
Transcriptions
Standard Mandarin
- Hanyu Pinyin: Huá Zīshēng

Burton Dewitt Watson (June 13, 1925 – April 1, 2017) was an American sinologist, translator, and writer known for his English translations of Chinese and Japanese literature. Watson's translations received many awards, including the Gold Medal Award of the Translation Center at Columbia University in 1979, the PEN Translation Prize in 1982 for his translation with Hiroaki Sato of From the Country of Eight Islands: An Anthology of Japanese Poetry, and again in 1995 for his translation of Selected Poems of Su Tung-p'o. In 2015, at age 88, Watson was awarded the PEN/Ralph Manheim Medal for Translation for his long and prolific translation career.

== Life and career ==
Watson was born on June 13, 1925, in New Rochelle, New York, where his father was a hotel manager. In 1943, at age 17, Watson dropped out of high school to join the U.S. Navy. He was stationed on repair vessels in the South Pacific during the final years of World War II. His ship was in the Marshall Islands when the war ended in August 1945, and on September 20, 1945 it sailed to Japan to anchor at the Yokosuka Naval Base, where Watson had his first direct experiences with Japan and East Asia. As he recounts in Rainbow World, on his first shore leave, he and his shipmates encountered a stone in Tokyo with musical notation on it; they sang the melody, as best they could. Some months later, Watson realized that he had been in Hibiya Park and that the song was "Kimigayo".

Watson left Japan in February 1946, was discharged from the Navy, and was accepted into Columbia University on the G.I. Bill, where he majored in Chinese. His main Chinese teachers were the American Sinologist L. Carrington Goodrich and the Chinese scholar Wang Chi-chen. At that time, most of the Chinese curriculum focused on learning to read Chinese characters and Chinese literature, as it was assumed that any "serious students" could later learn to actually speak Chinese by going to China. He also took one year of Japanese. Watson spent five years studying at Columbia, earning a B.A. in 1949 and an M.A. in 1951.

After receiving his master's degree, Watson hoped to move to China for further study, but the Chinese Communist Party—which had taken control of China in 1949 with their victory in the Chinese Civil War—had closed the country to Americans. He was unable to find any positions in Taiwan or Hong Kong, and so moved to Japan using the last of his GI savings. Once there, he secured three positions in Kyoto: as an English teacher at Doshisha University, as a graduate student and research assistant to Yoshikawa Kōjirō, Professor of Chinese Language and Literature at Kyoto University, and as a tutor in English, giving private lessons. His combined salary was about $50 per month, and he lived much like other Japanese graduate students. In 1952, he was able to resign his position at Doshisha, thanks to payment from Columbia University for his work on Sources in Chinese Tradition, and later in the year, a position as a Ford Foundation Overseas Fellow.

Watson had long been interested in translating verse. His first significant translations were of kanshi (poems in Chinese written by Japanese), made in 1954 for Donald Keene, who was compiling an anthology of Japanese literature. A few years later, Watson sent some translations of early Chinese poems from the Yutai Xinyong to Ezra Pound for comment; Pound replied but did not critique the translations. In subsequent years, Watson became friends with Gary Snyder, who lived in Kyoto in the 1950s, and through him Cid Corman and Allen Ginsberg.

In 1956, Watson received a PhD from Columbia for his dissertation "Ssu-ma Ch'ien: The Historian and His Work", a study of Sima Qian. He then worked as a member of Ruth Fuller Sasaki's team translating Buddhist texts into English under the auspices of Columbia University's Committee on Oriental Studies, returning to Columbia in August 1961. He subsequently taught at Columbia and Stanford as a professor of Chinese. He and Donald Keene frequently participated in the seminars that William Theodore de Bary conducted at Columbia.

Watson moved to Japan in 1973. He remained there for the rest of his life. He devoted much of his time to translation, both of literary works, and of more routine texts such as advertisements and instruction manuals. He never married, but was in a long-term relationship with his partner Norio Hayashi. He stated in an interview with John Balcom that his translations of Chinese poems were greatly influenced by the translations of Pound and Arthur Waley, particularly Waley. He also took up Zen meditation and kōan study. Although he worked as a translator for the Soka Gakkai, a Japanese Buddhist organization, he was not a follower of the Nichiren school of Buddhism or a member of the Soka Gakkai.

Despite his extensive activity in translating ancient Chinese texts, he did not visit China until he spent three weeks there in the summer of 1983, with expenses paid by the Soka Gakkai.

Watson died on April 1, 2017, aged 91, at the Hatsutomi Hospital in Kamagaya, Japan.

== Translations ==
Translations from Chinese include:

- The Lotus Sutra and Its Opening and Closing Sutras, Soka Gakkai, 2009 ISBN 978-4412014091
- Late Poems of Lu You, Ahadada Books, 2007
- Analects of Confucius, 2007
- The Record of the Orally Transmitted Teachings, 2004
- The Selected Poems of Du Fu, 2002
- Vimalakirti Sutra, New York: Columbia University Press, 1996
- Selected Poems of Su Tung-P'o, Copper Canyon Press, 1994
- The Lotus Sutra, Columbia University Press, 1993
- Records of the Grand Historian: Han Dynasty, Columbia University Press, 1993, ISBN 978-0-231-08164-1.
- The Tso Chuan: Selections from China’s Oldest Narrative History, 1989
- Chinese Lyricism: Shih Poetry from the Second to the Twelfth Century, 1971
- Cold Mountain: 100 Poems by the T’ang Poet Han-Shan, 1970
- The Old Man Who Does As He Pleases: Selections from the Poetry and Prose of Lu Yu, 1973
- Chinese Rhyme-Prose: Poems in the Fu Form from the Han and Six Dynasties Periods, 1971
- The Complete Works of Chuang Tzu, 1968
- Su Tung-p'o: Selections from a Sung Dynasty Poet, 1965
- Chuang Tzu: Basic Writings, 1964
- Han Fei Tzu: Basic Writings, 1964
- Hsün Tzu: Basic Writings, 1963
- Mo Tzu: Basic Writings, 1963
- Early Chinese Literature, 1962
- Records of the Grand Historian of China, 1961
- Ssu-ma Ch'ien, Grand Historian of China, 1958
- Chinese Rhyme-Prose: Poems in the Fu Form from the Han and Six Dynasties Periods. Rev. ed. New York Review Books, 2015.

Translations from Japanese include:

- The Tale of the Heike, 2006
- For All My Walking: Free-Verse Haiku of Taneda Santōka with Excerpts from His Diaries, 2004
- The Writings of Nichiren Daishonin, vol. 1 in 1999 and vol. 2 in 2006
- The Wild Geese (Gan, by Mori Ōgai), 1995
- Saigyō: Poems of a Mountain Home, 1991
- The Flower of Chinese Buddhism (Zoku Watakushi no Bukkyō-kan, by Ikeda Daisaku), 1984
- Grass Hill: Poems and Prose by the Japanese Monk Gensei, 1983
- Ryōkan: Zen Monk-Poet of Japan, 1977
- Buddhism: The First Millennium (Watakushi no Bukkyō-kan, by Ikeda Daisaku), 1977
- The Living Buddha (Watakushi no Shakuson-kan, by Ikeda Daisaku), 1976

Many of Watson's translations were published by Columbia University Press.
