= Chūgan Engetsu =

Japanese poet

Chūgan Engetsu (中巌円月; January 28, 1300 – February 9, 1375), Japanese poet, occupies a prominent place in Japanese Literature of the Five Mountains, literature in Chinese written in Japan. Chugan's achievement was his mastery of this difficult medium, a signal of the ripening of Five Mountains poetry and prose in Japan. He was born in Kamakura of a family that claimed descent from Emperor Kanmu (r. 781–806). At age eight he entered the prestigious monetary of the Zen Rinzai sect in Kamakura as an acolyte. At twelve he was a disciple of Dokei. At this time Chugan began in earnest his Chinese studies, devoting himself to the Classic of Filial Piety and Analects. He left for Kyushu hoping to travel to China, but did not succeed. After this disappointment he traveled to Kyoto and met the reclusive patriarch Kokan Shiren (1278–1346). In 1320 he realized his hopes for a journey to China that resulted in a seven-year study-tour of Zen masters and institutions. In 1332 Chugan returned in disgust to a Japan wracked by civil war and unrest. He chose for his residence the Nanzenji monastery in Kyoto. In 1339 he was asked to establish the Kisshoji monastery. From this point until his death in 1375 he was residing as head of many of the Zen establishments in Japan. His writings reflect both a Confucian concern with social values and a Zen love of the ironic and iconoclastic.
