= Du Shenyan =

Chinese poet

- 杜審言
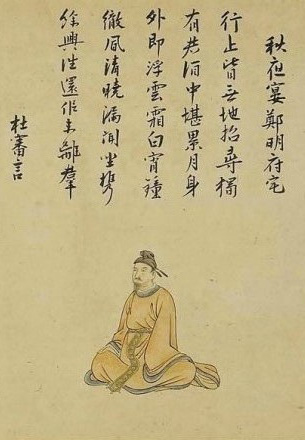
- Shenyan by Kanō Tsunenobu, painted in the 18th century
- Born: c. 645; Xiangyang, Hubei, Tang Empire
- Died: 708 (aged c. 63); Chang'an, Shaanxi, Tang Empire
- Occupations: Poet, politician
- Children: Du Xian; Du Bing; Du Zhuan; Du Deng
- Relatives: Du Fu (grandson)

Chinese name
- Traditional Chinese: 杜審言
- Simplified Chinese: 杜审言
Transcriptions
Standard Mandarin
- Hanyu Pinyin: Dù Shěnyán
- Wade–Giles: Tu Shen-yen

Bijian
- Traditional Chinese: 必簡
- Simplified Chinese: 必简
Transcriptions
Standard Mandarin
- Hanyu Pinyin: Bìjiǎn

Du Shenyan (Wade–Giles: Tu Shen-yen, c. 645 – 708) was a Chinese poet and politician. He was a poet of the early Tang dynasty, and one of his poems was collected in the popular anthology Three Hundred Tang Poems.

== Biography ==
Du Shenyan was born around 645 and lived into his sixties. He was a poet, calligrapher (none of which is known to survive), and the grandfather of the famous poet Du Fu.

== Poetry ==
Du Shenyan is perhaps best known for his one poem which is included in the Three Hundred Tang Poems, translated by Witter Bynner as "On a Walk in the Early Spring Harmonizing a Poem By my Friend Lu Stationed at Changzhou". A total of forty-three of his poems survive.
