= Eight Beauties of Qinhuai =

Chinese female artists of the Ming-Qing transition period

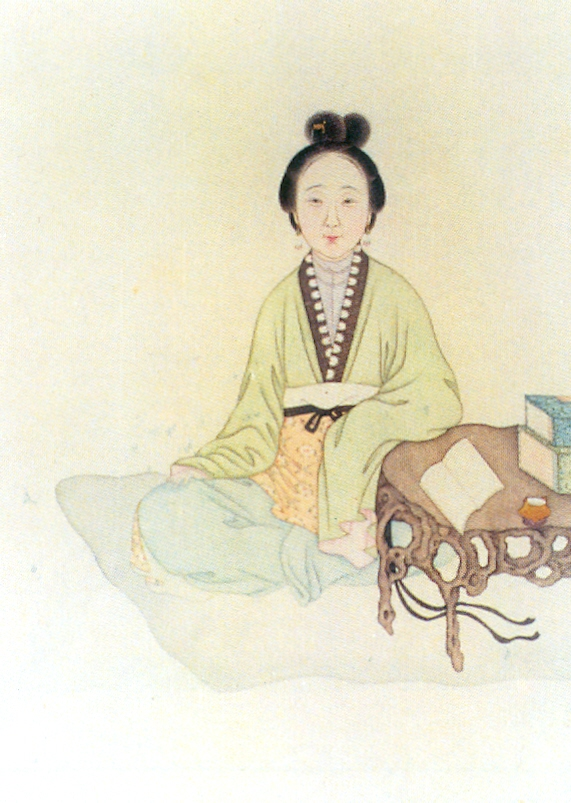
A 17th-century portrait of Chen Yuanyuan

The Eight Beauties of Qinhuai (Chinese: 秦淮八艳; pinyin: Qínhuái Bāyàn), also called the Eight Beauties of Jinling (Chinese: 金陵八艳), were eight famous Yiji or Geji during the Ming-Qing transition period who resided along the Qinhuai River in Nankin (now Nanjing, Jiangsu Province, China). As well as possessing great beauty, they were all skilled in literature, poetry, fine arts, dancing and music.

The name originates either from the 1693 book Banqiao Zaji (板橋雜記) by Yu Huai (余懷), or from the 19th century book Qinhuai Bayan Tuyong (秦淮八豔圖詠), in which authors Zhang Jingqi (張景祁) and Ye Yanlan (葉衍蘭) chose the eight most famous (in their view) Yijis of the period to be the subjects of the book.

During the late Ming dynasty, elite Yijis challenged the gender stereotypes of Confucian values. In contrast to the women of the gentry, who were often discouraged from cultivating talent, lest it undermine their virtue as wives and mothers, the Yijis were educated in painting, poetry, and music. In addition, they owned property and participated in the public scene.

Also known as The Elegant Eight of River Qinhuai and The Eight Great Courtesans of the Ming, the Yijis were Ma Xianglan (馬湘蘭), Bian Yujing (卞玉京), Li Xiangjun (李香君), Liu Rushi (柳如是), Dong Xiaowan (董小宛), Gu Hengbo (顧橫波), Kou Baimen (寇白門) and Chen Yuanyuan (陳圓圓).

== The Eight Beauties ==
=== Ma Xianglan ===
Ma Xianglan (馬湘蘭) was born in Nanjing, and she lived in the entertainment district along the Qinhuai River. As a matriarch in Yiji society, she encouraged the education and training of Yijis in the arts. In order to maintain her reputation as an elite Yiji, she only allowed educated men or young student lords within her residence.

At the age of 15, Ma Shouzhen formally assumed the position of Yiji. Before this, she may have received education from a proprietor during her childhood. As Yiji matriarch, she befriended many poets and intellects such as Peng Nian (彭年; 1505–1566), Zhou Tianqiu (周天球; 1514–1595), Xu Wei (1521–1593), Xue Mingyi (薛明益; late 16th century), and Wang Zhideng (王穉登; 1535–1612). The poets would write poems inspired by her or for her, describing Ma as beautiful with a warm and welcoming personality. During their visits, Ma Shouzhen joined them in making paintings, poems, and plays. She also hosted parties on her multi-leveled house-boat with the literati as her guests.

=== Bian Yujing ===
Bian Yujing (卞玉京) was a Yiji and painter in Qinhuai during the late Ming period. Born into an official family, the family hit hard times when her father died. Bian and her sister became singing girls to support themselves. Bian was adept at writing poetry, music, calligraphy and painting.

She exchanged poems with author and poet Qian Qianyi. Chinese general Wu Sangui was amongst her patrons, as was poet Wu Weiye who from the 1630s to the 1660s wrote poems about Bian. After the Manchus invaded in 1644, Bian moved around the Yangtze area. She later took her vows and became a Daoist priestess.

=== Li Xiangjun ===
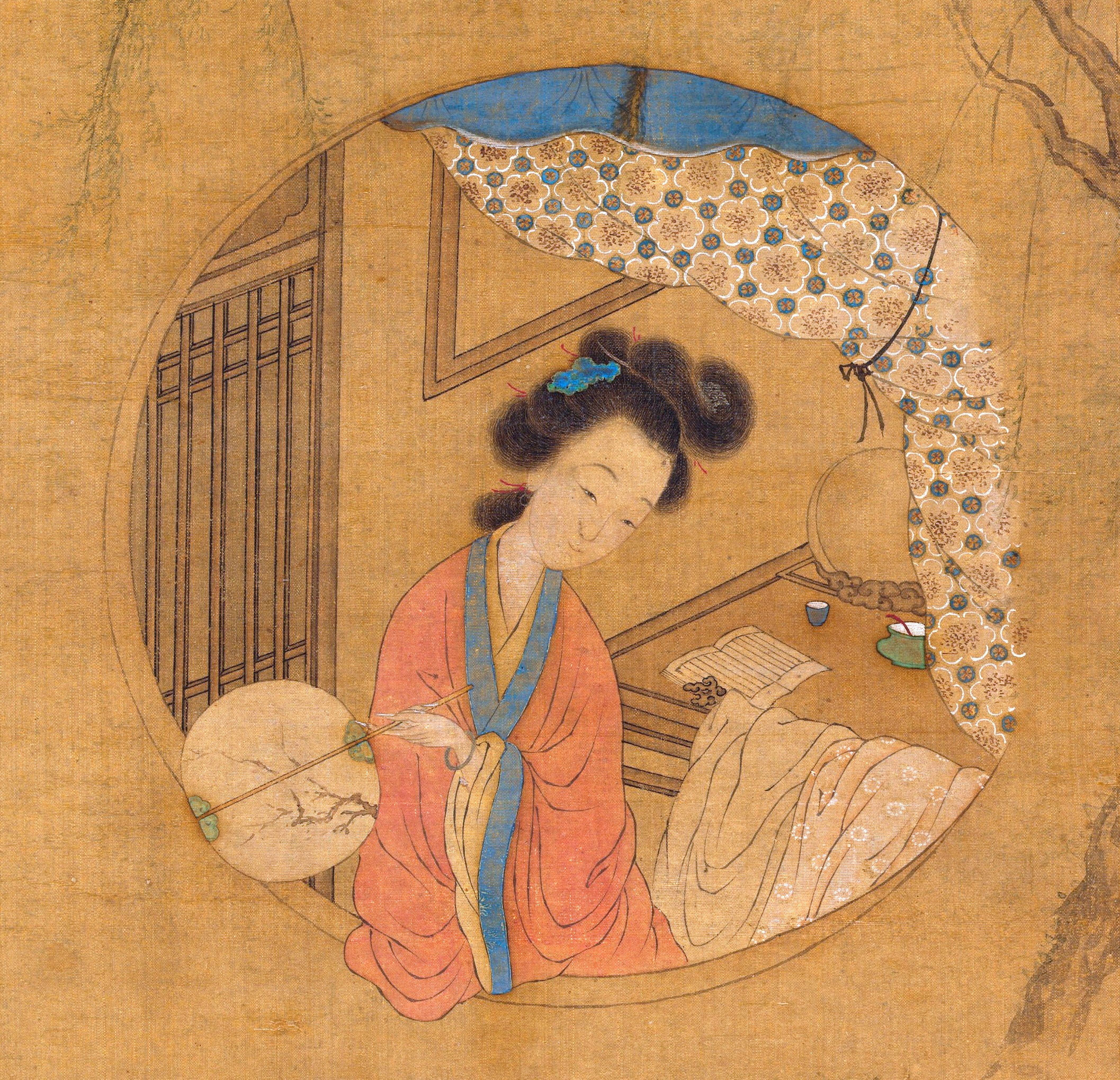
Painting of Li Xiangjun, 1817

Li Xiangjun (李香君) is also referred to as Li Ji (李姬) or Li Xiang (李香) in contemporary sources. In order to demonstrate respect for her, later scholars appended the character jun (君) to her name. Her courtesy name was Shanzhui (扇墜).

No written records from the time Li lived record where she was born, but popular modern theories suggest that she was the daughter of an official, who was demoted and his family either killed or sold. Li was adopted by the owner of a gelou in Nanjing called Meixiang House (媚香樓), whose surname she took. She was taught to dance, sing, paint, play music, and write poetry. Meixiang House was a favoured gelou of the literati and officials, with Li's adopted mother known for her generosity and chivalry. By age 13, Li was renowned for her singing and playing the pipa that her mistress charged 20 gold taels per guest to see her.

Li met Hou Fangyu at Meixiang House in 1648. Hou sent her poems and Li performed for him in return. When Hou left to sit the imperial examinations (which he failed), Li waited for him and refused to perform for the inspector general of Huaiyang County. Li's romance with Hou Fangyu has been called one of the greatest romances of Chinese history.

=== Liu Rushi ===
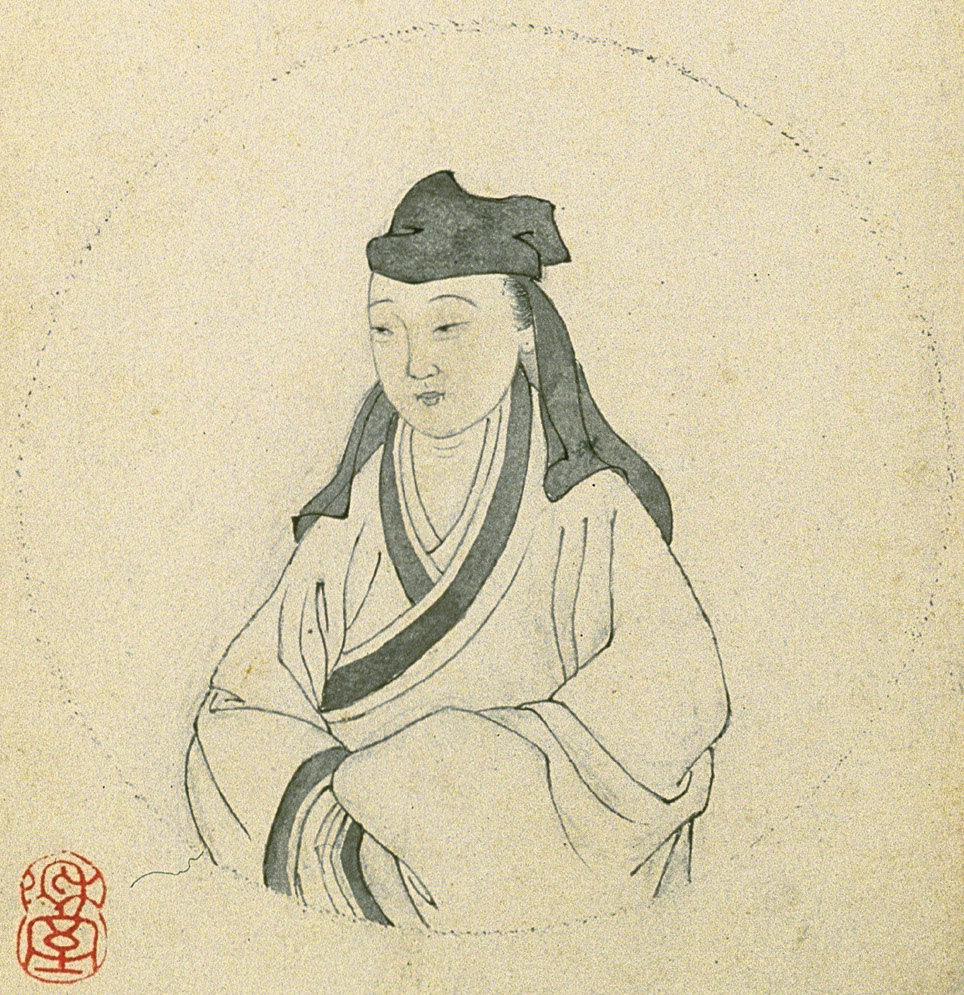
1847 portrait of Liu Rushi, ink on paper, by Lu Ji and Cheng Tinglu

Liu Rushi (柳如是) is believed to have been born in Jiaxing, Liu was sold by her family as a concubine to the grand secretary Zhou Daodeng (周道登). At the age of thirteen, a scandal led to her expulsion from Zhou's household, and she was sold to a gelou in Suzhou. At seventeen, she had her first major love affair, with the painter Tang Shuda. Already a noted poet and painter herself at this early age, she met Chen Zilong (陳子龍) in 1635 and lived with him for about a year, eventually leaving after his family disapproved of their liaison. After leaving Chen, she managed a gelou in Wujiang. An affair with the artist Wang Janming ended when Wang failed to attend an appointment with her at the Rainbow Pavilion. Another affair with Song Yuanwen, a government official, ended when his vacillations over marriage resulted in Liu smashing her lute and storming off in a fit of pique.

In 1640 Liu embarked on a campaign to marry the respected scholar Qian Qianyi. Dressed in men's clothing, she accosted Qian and requested his opinion on one of her poems. Qian apparently believed her to be a man, but later in the year he had established her at a specially built hermitage in the grounds of his Suzhou estate, called the "According to Sutra Studio". They married in 1641, whilst on a river cruise; Qian bestowing upon his bride the new name of Hedong. Although he married her as a concubine, Qian treated Liu as his principal wife, and they were married in a formal wedding ceremony. Her affinity for cross-dressing persisted after they were married; she regularly wore men's clothing whilst in public and on occasion made calls on her husband's behalf whilst dressed in his Confucian robes (this affectation earned her the nickname rushi (儒士), "Confucian Gentleman", which also puns on her chosen name Rushi).

=== Dong Xiaowan ===
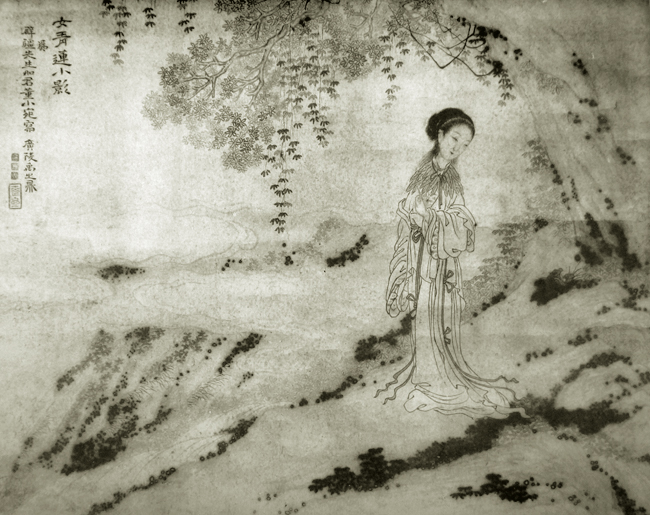
Dong Xiaowan painted by Yu Zhiding after her death

Dong Xiaowan (1624–1651) was a Chinese Yiji, poet and writer, also known by her pen name Dong Qinglian (董青蓮).

Dong has been described as the famous Yiji of her time, known for her beauty and talent in singing, needlework and the tea ceremony. She lived in Qinhuai District of Nanjing. Similar to other Yijis of the late Ming Dynasty, Dong's moral qualities were emphasised among her admirers more than her talents.

Dong's mother died in 1642, leaving her to struggle financially. The noble Mao Xiang (冒襄), also known as Mao Bijiang, had attempted to meet with Dong several times, but had pursued a relationship with the Yiji Chen Yuanyuan instead. After Chen was abducted by a noble associated with the imperial court, Mao visited Dong. Her mother had been dead for two weeks and Dong was quite ill. She proposed that she become his concubine and, refusing to take no for an answer, allegedly followed him for 27 days on his boat. Eventually, the two agreed to wait for Mao to pass the imperial examinations, which he failed. In order to facilitate Dong's marriage, Qian Qianyi, husband of fellow Yiji Liu Rushi, paid off her debts of 3,000 gold taels and had her name struck from the musicians' register. She then lived with Mao in Rugao as his concubine, alongside his wife Lady Su.

She has been described as an ideal dutiful, sacrificing and loyal wife and daughter-in-law during her marriage to Mao Bijiang, who as a loyalist of the Ming dynasty was persecuted after the Qing dynasty's rise to power in 1644. When Mao, Lady Su and Dong were forced to flee their home in 1644, Dong abandoned her more valuable belongings to save her writings and paintings. They stayed in Huzhou until Zhu Yousong was crowned emperor in Nanjing later in 1644. Soon after, the household moved to Zhejiang, where Dong compiled a book titled Liuyan Ji (流宴集) about jewellery, women's costumes, pavilions and parties.

=== Gu Hengbo ===
Gu Hengbo (顧橫波), also known as Gu Mei (顧媚) was born near Nanjing in 1619. At the beginning of the Chongzhen reign, Gu Mei became a Yiji in the Qinhuai River district of Nanjing. In her Tower Meilou in Qinhuai district in Nanjing, she hosted a famous literary salon, which counted Chen Liang, Qian Lucan and Mao Xiang among its guests. Yu Huai described Meilou (literally house of bewitchment) as lavish and extravagant.

She fell in love with one of her patrons, Liu Fang, promised to marry him and to end her career as a Yiji. When she later changed her mind, Liu Fang committed suicide.

One of her patrons, the career official Gong Dingzi, paid 1,000 ounces of silver for her services. In 1643, she left her profession to become a concubine to Gong Dingzi and settled with him in the capital. His openly demonstrated love for her attracted much attention during their time, as it offended the norms of Confucian ideals, and her influence over him became legendary. She is known to have saved the Yan Ermei from execution, and to have been the benefactor of the artist Zhu Yizun.

=== Kou Baimen ===
Kou Baimen (寇白門), born in 1624 and also known as Kou Mei (寇湄; Mei was her given name, Baimen her courtesy name), was a famous Chinese Yiji known for her chivalry.

Kou was a Yiji and when she was 18 or 19 her indenture was bought out by a high official, Zhu Guobi (朱國弼), whom she married. The wedding was a lavish affair with 5,000 soldiers lining the route from Wuding Bridge to Zhu's home at Nei Bridge, but the marriage soon deteriorated. When the Ming dynasty fell to the Manchus in 1645, Zhu was arrested and imprisoned. Kou brought his freedom for 20,000 taels of gold.

The payment for Zhu's release was seen as her buying herself out of the marriage. She then lived the life of a Yiji, receiving poets and statesmen in her garden studio. The poet Fang Wen (方文) visited her in 1655 and wrote 3 poems for her. Kou was painted by many of the leading artists of the time.

=== Chen Yuanyuan ===
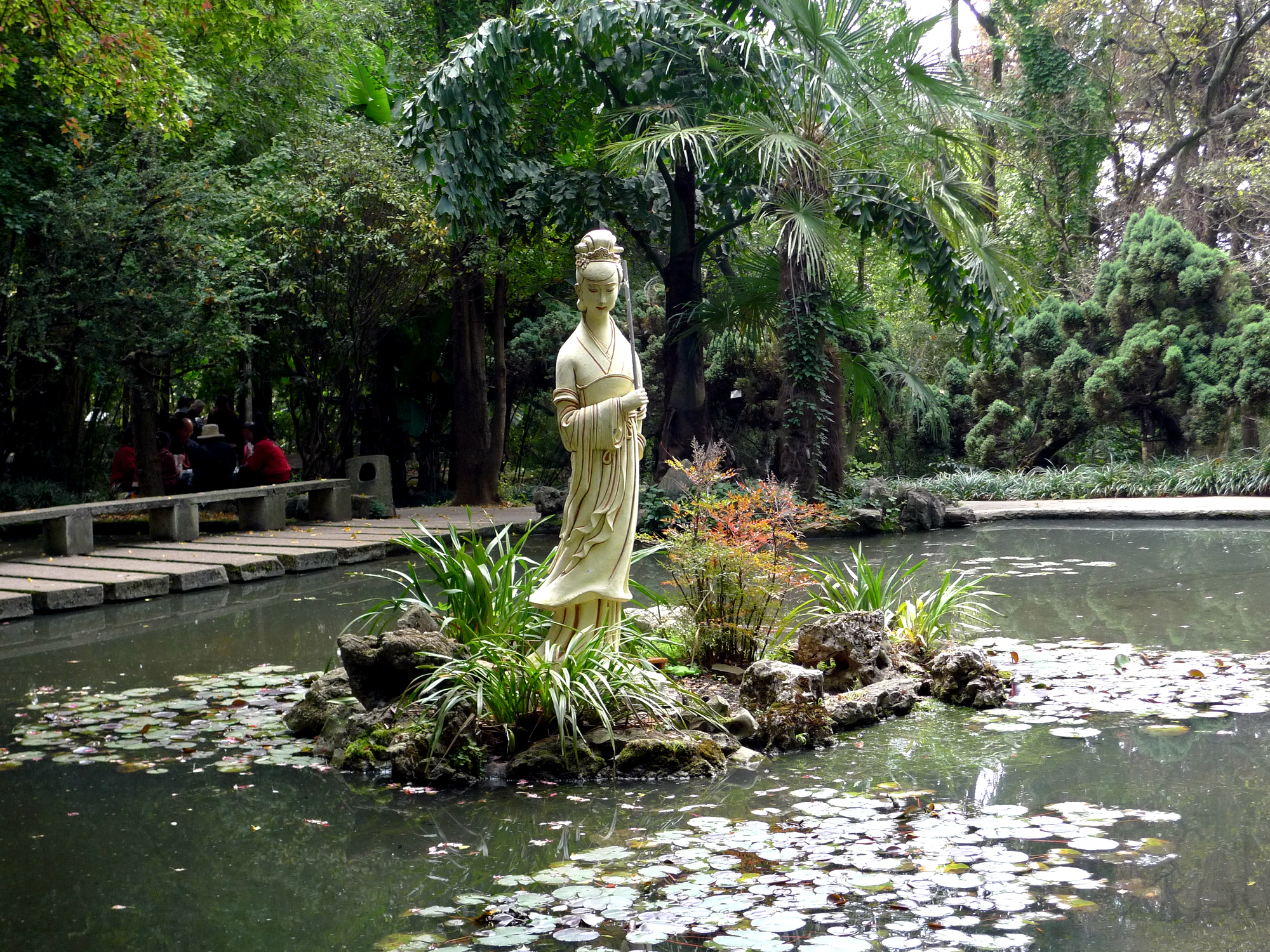
Statue of Chen Yuanyuan in Gold Hall Park in Kunming

Chen Yuanyuan (陳圓圓) was born to a peasant family in Jiangsu province, and on the death of her father, she became a Yiji. Chen became a leading figure in the Suzhou opera scene. In 1642, she became the lover of the scholar and poet Mao Xiang. Subsequently, Chen was bought by the family of Tian Hongyu, father of one of the Chongzhen Emperor's concubines. She was then either purchased for Wu Sangui by his father, or given to Wu as a gift by Tian.

In April 1644, the rebel army of Li Zicheng captured the Ming capital of Beijing, and the Chongzhen Emperor committed suicide. Knowing that Wu Sangui's formidable army at Ningyuan posed a serious threat, Li immediately made overtures to gain Wu's allegiance. Li sent two letters to Wu, including one in the name of Wu's father, then held captive in Beijing. Before Wu Sangui could respond, he received word that his entire household had been slaughtered. Wu then wrote to the Qing regent, Dorgon, indicating his willingness to combine forces to oust the rebels from Beijing, thus setting the stage for the Qing conquest of China.

== Bibliography ==
- Berg, Daria (2013). Women and the Literary World in Early Modern China, 1580-1700. Routledge. ISBN 9781136290220.
- Berg, Daria; Starr, Chloe (2007). The Quest for Gentility in China: Negotiations Beyond Gender and Class. Routledge. ISBN 9781134077045.
- Cahill, James. "Women In Chinese Paintings: Courtesans, Concubines, and Willing Women". jamescahill.info.
- Cass, Victoria Baldwin (1 January 1999). Dangerous Women: Warriors, Grannies, and Geishas of the Ming. Rowman & Littlefield. ISBN 978-0-8476-9395-5.
- Chang, Kang-i Sun; Saussy, Haun; Kwong, Charles Yim-tze (1999). Women Writers of Traditional China: An Anthology of Poetry and Criticism. Stanford University Press. ISBN 9780804732314.
- Chang, Kang-i Sun; Owen, Stephen (2010). The Cambridge History of Chinese Literature: From 1375. Cambridge University Press. ISBN 9780521855594.
- Chen, Shengxi (1998). "Dong Xiaowan". In Lily Xiao Hong Lee; Clara Lau; A.D. Stefanowska (eds.). Biographical Dictionary of Chinese Women: Volume 1: The Qing Period, 1644 – 1911. Translated by S. M. Kwan. ISBN 9780765600431.
- Dai, Lianbin (April 2004). Li Mingrui's private troupe and its spectators (1644-62) (Thesis). University of British Columbia, Canada.
- Ditmore, Melissa Hope (2006). Encyclopedia of Prostitution and Sex Work. Greenwood Publishing Group. ISBN 9780313329692.
- van Gulik, R. H. (1974). Sexual Life in Ancient China: A Preliminary Survey of Chinese Sex and Society from ca. 1500 B.C. till 1644 A.D. Leiden: Brill. ISBN 9789004039179.
- Hammond, Kenneth James; Stapleton, Kristin Eileen (2008). The Human Tradition in Modern China. Rowman & Littlefield. ISBN 9780742554665.
- Hou Fangyu 侯方域 (1712). "李姬传" [Tale of Woman Li]. 壮悔堂文集 [Zhuanghuitang Collected Works] (in Chinese). Archived from the original on 13 September 2017.
- Ko, Dorothy (1994). Teachers of the Inner Chambers: Women and Culture in Seventeenth-Century China. Stanford University Press. ISBN 978-0-8047-2359-6.
- Lee, Lily Xiao Hong; Lau, Clara; Stefanowska, A. D. (2015). Biographical Dictionary of Chinese Women: v. 1: The Qing Period, 1644-1911. Routledge. ISBN 9781317475873.
- Lu, Tina (2001). Persons, Roles, and Minds: Identity in Peony Pavilion and Peach Blossom Fan. Stanford University Press. ISBN 9780804742023.
- Mann, Susan (1997). Precious Records: Women in China's Long Eighteenth Century. Stanford University Press. ISBN 9780804727440.
- Merlin, Monica (2011). "The Nanjing Courtesan Ma Shouzhen (1548–1604): Gender, Space and Painting in the Late Ming Pleasure Quarter". Gender & History. 23 (3): 630–652. doi:10.1111/j.1468-0424.2011.01660.x. S2CID 141846753.
- Peterson, Barbara Bennett (2000), Notable Women of China: Shang Dynasty to the Early Twentieth Century, East Gate, pp. 330–334, ISBN 978-0-7656-0504-7
- Smith, Bonnie G. (2008). The Oxford Encyclopedia of Women in World History: 4 Volume Set. Oxford University Press. ISBN 978-0-19-514890-9.
- Tseng, Yu-Ho (1993). "Women Painters of the Ming Dynasty". Artibus Asiae. 53 (1/2): 249–261. doi:10.2307/3250517. JSTOR 3250517.
- Wakeman, Frederic Jr (1986), The Great Enterprise: The Manchu Reconstruction of Imperial Order in Seventeenth-century China, Berkeley: University of California Press, ISBN 978-0520048041
- Wang 王, Chen 晨 (2011). "秦淮河上真实的李香君——李香君身世与才貌考" [The real Li Xiangjun of Qinhuai River: Consideration of Li Xiangjun's reality and talents]. Yuwen Xuekan (in Chinese) (6): 88–89 & 94.
- Wetzel, Jean (2002). "Hidden connections: courtesans in the art world of the Ming Dynasty". Women's Studies. 31 (5): 645–669. doi:10.1080/00497870214051. S2CID 145231141.
- Xu, Sufeng (February 2007). Lotus Flowers Rising from the Dark Mud: Late Ming Courtesans and Their Poetry (PDF) (Thesis). McGill University, Canada.
- Yahui, Tao (2015). Count the talented women of ancient China 细数中国古代的那些才女 (in Chinese). Jilin Publishing Group Co. Ltd. ISBN 9787553462493.
- Yang, Haosheng (2016). A Modernity Set to a Pre-Modern Tune: Classical-Style Poetry of Modern Chinese Writers. BRILL. ISBN 9789004310803.
- Yu 怀, Huai 怀 (1693). 板桥杂记 [Notes from Banqiao] (in Chinese).
- Zurndorfer, Harriet T. (2011). "Prostitutes and courtesans in the Confucian moral universe of Late Ming China (1550–1644)". International Review of Social History. 56: 197–216. doi:10.1017/S0020859011000411.
