= Qing poetry =

Poetry of the Qing dynasty

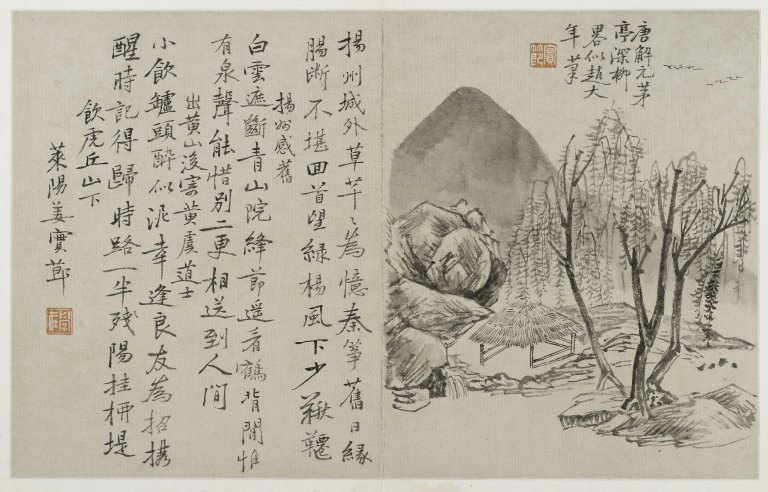
Landscape with Poems from An Album the Three Perfections, by Jiang Shijie

Qing poetry refers to the poetry of or typical of the Qing dynasty (1644–1911). Classical Chinese poetry continued to be the major poetic form of the Qing dynasty, during which the debates, trends and widespread literacy of the Ming period began to flourish once again after a transitional period during which the Qing dynasty had established its dominance. Also, popular versions of Classical Chinese poetry were transmitted through Qing dynasty anthologies, such as the collections of Tang poetry known as the Complete Tang Poems and the Three Hundred Tang Poems. The poetry of the Qing dynasty has an ongoing and growing body of scholarly literature associated with its study. Both the poetry of the Ming dynasty and the poetry of the Qing dynasty are studied for poetry associated with Chinese opera, the developmental trends of Classical Chinese poetry and the transition to the more vernacular type of Modern Chinese poetry, as well as poetry by women in Chinese culture.

== Background ==
The Qing dynasty was the last imperial dynasty of China, ruling from 1644 to 1911 with a brief restoration, in 1917. The Qing dynasty was preceded by the Ming dynasty and followed by the Republic of China. The dynasty was founded by the Manchu Aisin Gioro clan in contemporary Northeastern China, under the rule of Nurhaci, a former vassal of the Ming emperors. By 1635, Nurhaci's son Hong Taiji could claim they constituted a single and united Manchu people and eventually they seized control of Beijing and overthrew Li Zicheng's short-lived Shun dynasty, completing their conquest of China around 1683 under the Kangxi Emperor. Over the course of its reign, the Qing integration with Chinese culture included the continuation of Chinese literature and Classical Chinese poetry. The imperial examinations continued and Han civil servants administered the empire alongside Manchu ones.

== Poets and poetry ==
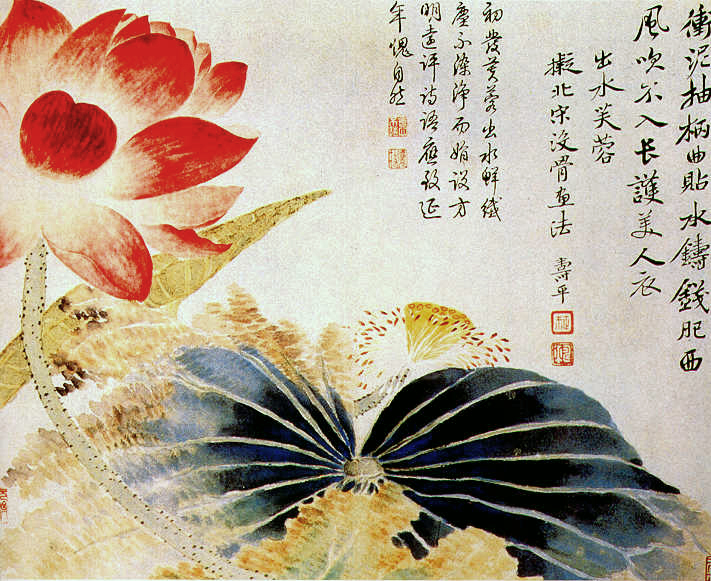
Lotus Flower Breaking the Surface by Yun Shouping

Classical Chinese poetry continued to be the major poetic form of the Qing dynasty. This was also a time of related literary developments, such as the collections of Tang poetry, under the Kangxi Emperor. The debates, trends and widespread literacy of the Ming period began to flourish once again after a transitional period during which the Qing dynasty had established its dominance. The "Three Masters of Jiangdong" wrote during the Ming-Qing transition. They were Gong Dingzi, Wu Weiye, Qian Qianyi, who were influential in reviving the ci (song lyric) style.

In addition to those identified primarily as poets, such as Wang Shizhen, Nara Singde (Nalan Xingdei), and Zhao Yi, many figures known for their contributions in other fields wrote memorable poetry, such as the philosopher Gu Yanwu. The fresh poetic voice of Yuan Mei has won wide appeal, as have the long narrative poems by Wu Jiaji.

Kunqu opera matured and led toward the later Chinese opera tradition of drama, poetry and music combined. The painter-poet tradition thrived with exemplars such as Yun Shouping. The challenge for researchers grew as even more people became poets and even more poems were preserved, including (with Yuan Mei's encouragement) more poetry by women. In 1980 fine shi poems by the famed Qing novelist Liu E were published for the first time, illustrating the potential to continue finding sunken treasure in the vast body of surviving Qing poetry.

== Influence ==
Much of the modern popular versions of Classical Chinese poetry were transmitted through Qing dynasty anthologies, such as the Complete Tang Poems and the Three Hundred Tang Poems.

== See also ==
- Chinese literature
- Kong Shangren
- Shen Shanbao
- Three perfections
