= Ming poetry =

Period of Classical Chinese poetry

Peach Festival of the Queen Mother of the West, early 17th century, anonymous painter of the Ming dynasty.

Ming poetry refers to the poetry of or typical of the Ming dynasty (1368–1644). With over one million specimens of Ming poetry surviving today, the poetry of the Ming dynasty represents one of the major periods of Classical Chinese poetry, as well as an area of active modern academic research. Ming poetry (and Chinese art and literature in general) is marked by 2 transitional phases, the transition between the Yuan dynasty which was the predecessor to the Ming, and the Qing-Ming transition which eventually resulted in the succeeding Qing dynasty. Although in politico-dynastic terms, the dynastic leadership of China is historically relatively clear-cut, the poetic periods involved encompass the lifespans and works of poets whose lives and poetic output transcend both the end of one dynasty and the initiatory period of the next.

== Background ==
Following the collapse of the Mongol-led Yuan dynasty, and upon its establishment, the Ming dynasty for much or most of its existence represents an era of orderly government and social stability. During the Ming dynasty the arts flourished, including painting, music, literature, dramatic theater, and poetry. Eventually, the Ming capital Beijing fell in 1644, together with most of the rest of the country; however, regimes loyal to the Ming throne — collectively called the Southern Ming — survived until 1662, the year finalizing the replacement of the Ming dynasty by the Qing dynasty, by the Manchu conquest of China.

== Poets and poetry ==
Leading Ming poets include Gao Qi, Li Dongyang, and the publisher-poet Yuan Hongdao. Representatives of the dramatist-poet tradition include Tang Xianzu and Li Yu. Li Yu is also a prime example of the Ming-Qing transition's emotional outpouring when disorder swept away Ming stability as the incoming dynasty's Manchu warriors conquered from North to South. Ming representatives of the painter-poet tradition include Shen Zhou, Tang Yin, and Wen Zhengming. Interest in Tang poetry was expressed by the publication of several important anthologies, including Gao Bing's Graded Compendium of Tang Poetry (Tangshi Pinhui, 唐詩品彙).

From the late Ming onwards, there was a new interest in women's writings and an increasing number of female poets appeared. Male literati edited anthologies of women's poems, however such actions were shocking to many orthodox thinkers. The literati celebrated women's works as embodying desirable qualities that men lacked, such as innocence, the childlike mind (童心), xingling (性灵) and emotions. Many of these well-known writers were also Gējìs, including Liu Rushi, Wang Wei, Dong Xiaowan and Gu Mei.

== Influence ==
The area of Ming poetry is one in which there are certain acknowledged major poets representative of the era; however, it is also an era associated with a dynamic of ongoing scholarly research, as well as less formal investigation.

== See also ==
=== General ===
- Chinese Sanqu poetry
- Classical Chinese poetry (for general information)
- Ōta Nanpo (for an example of influence on a Japanese poet)
- The Latter Five Poets of the Southern Garden (regarding important Cantonese poets of the sixteenth century)
- The Latter Seven Masters (a Ming dynasty poetry circle)
- Category:Ming dynasty plays (for information on the topic of Ming-dynasty plays)
- Category:Ming dynasty poets (for Wikipedia articles categorized as being on the topic of Ming-dynasty poets)

=== Background ===
- Fall of the Ming dynasty (an article on the fall of Ming and rise of the Qing Dynasty)
- Manchu conquest of China (another article on the fall of Ming and rise of Qing)
- Ming dynasty (general information on dynasty)
- Qing dynasty (next major dynasty)
- Yuan dynasty (previous dynasty)
