= Gu Hengbo =

Chinese artist (1619–1664)

- Born: Gu Mei; 1619
- Died: 1664 (aged 44–45)
- Other names: Xu Shanchi; Xu Zhizhu
- Occupations: Gējì, painter, Poet
- Title: Lady Hengbo
- Spouse: Gong Dingzi

Gu Mei (Chinese: 顧媚; Wade–Giles: Ku Mei; 1619–1664), better known by her art name Gu Hengbo (Chinese: 顧橫波; Wade–Giles: Ku Heng-po) - also known as Xu Shanchi (徐善持) and Xu Zhizhu (徐智珠) after her marriage - was a Chinese Gējì, poet and painter. She received the title "Lady" (furen) from the early Qing court, and is often addressed as "Lady Hengbo" in Qing writings.

Gu Hengbo was famous for both her beauty and her talent in painting and poetry. As such, she was considered an elite geji, alongside names like Dong Xiaowan, Bian Yujing, and Liu Rushi. She was admired for her paintings of orchids, and published a collection of poems which gained good critical reviews (although few of her works have survived). She was one of the Eight Beauties of Qinhuai described by late Qing officials. The other famed gejis of this group are Ma Xianglan, Bian Yujing, Li Xiangjun, Dong Xiaowan, Liu Rushi, Kou Baimen, and Chen Yuanyuan.

== Life ==
Gu Hengbo was born near Nanjing in 1619. Before her marriage to Gong Dingzi, Gu was a Gējì in Nanjing during the reign of Chongzhen. She was well versed in literature and history, and was good at poetry, being known as "the best in Nan Qu" (南曲第一). Gu Hengbo painted both orchids and landscapes in her own style, and did not follow the painting methods of previous generations. When she was eighteen years old, she joined Li Xiangjun, Wang Yue, and others in the "Lan Society", founded by Yangzhou celebrity Zheng Yuanxun in Nanjing. In her Tower Meilou in the Qinhuai district, she hosted a famous literary salon, which counted Chen Liang, Qian Lucan and Mao Xiang among its guests. Yu Huai described Meilou (literally house of bewitchment) as lavish and extravagant.

Gu Hengbo also acted in kunqu as a male (sheng) impersonator. One of her roles was Zhou Yu (周羽) in Disciplining the Son (教子). The writer Yu Huai (余懷) recounted how, after he had helped her when she ran afoul of the law, she offered to perform a stage drama for him on his birthday.

She fell in love with one of her patrons, Liu Fang (劉芳), promised to marry him and to end her career as a Geji. When she later changed her mind, Liu Fang committed suicide.

One of her patrons, the career official Gong Dingzi, paid 1,000 ounces of silver for her services. In 1643, she left her profession to become a concubine to Gong, and settled with him in the capital. His openly demonstrated love for her attracted much attention during their time, as it offended the norms of Confucian ideals, and her influence over him became legendary. She is known to have saved the poet Yan Ermei from execution, and to have been the benefactor of the artist Zhu Yizun.

In 1659, Gu Hengbo gave birth to a daughter. Anxious to have a son, Gong Dingzi built a private Buddhist temple where the couple could pray for a son.

== Bibliography ==
- Berg, Daria (2013). Women and the Literary World in Early Modern China, 1580-1700. Routledge. ISBN 9781136290220.
- Berg, Daria; Starr, Chloe (2007). The Quest for Gentility in China: Negotiations Beyond Gender and Class. Routledge. ISBN 9781134077045.
- Lee, Lily Xiao Hong; Lau, Clara; Stefanowska, A. D. (2015). Biographical Dictionary of Chinese Women: v. 1: The Qing Period, 1644-1911. Routledge. ISBN 9781317475873.
- Mann, Susan (1997). Precious Records: Women in China's Long Eighteenth Century. Stanford University Press. ISBN 9780804727440.
- Wang, Dewei; Shang, Wei (2005). Dynastic Crisis and Cultural Innovation: From the Late Ming to the Late Qing and Beyond. Harvard University Asia Center. ISBN 9780674017818.
- Zhang, Hongsheng [張宏生] (2002). "Gong Dingzi and the Courtesan Gu Mei: Their Romance and the Revival of the Song Lyric in the Ming-Qing Transition", in Hsiang Lectures on Chinese Poetry, Volume 2, Grace S. Fong, editor. (Montreal: Center for East Asian Research, McGill University).
