= Chen Yuanyuan =

Actress and courtesan in Ming China

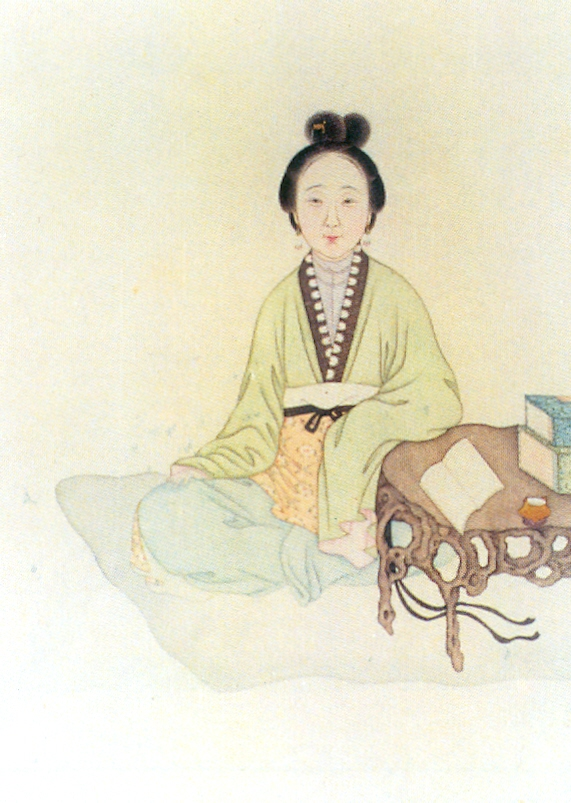
- A 17th-century portrait of Chen Yuanyuan
- Born: Xing Yuan c. 1623; Jiangsu, Ming Empire
- Died: 1689 or 1695; Majiazhai, Guizhou, Qing Empire
- Burial: Majiazhai, Guizhou, Qing Empire
- Spouse: Wu Sangui
- Occupation: courtesan, actress

Chen Yuanyuan
- Traditional Chinese: 陳圓圓
- Simplified Chinese: 陈圆圆
Transcriptions
Standard Mandarin
- Hanyu Pinyin: Chén Yuányuán
- Wade–Giles: Ch'en Yüan-yüan

Xing Yuan (birth name)
- Chinese: 邢沅
Transcriptions
Standard Mandarin
- Hanyu Pinyin: Xíng Yuán

Wanfen (courtesy name)
- Chinese: 畹芬
Transcriptions
Standard Mandarin
- Hanyu Pinyin: Wǎnfēn

Chen Yuanyuan (c. 1623–1689 or 1695) was a Chinese courtesan who later became the concubine of military leader Wu Sangui. In Chinese folklore, Chen's capture by the Shun army during Li Zicheng's conquest of Beijing in 1644 prompted Wu's fateful decision to open Shanhai Pass to the Manchu army in order to form a joint force to rescue her, an act that sealed the downfall of the Ming dynasty and the founding of the Qing.

== Biography ==
Chen Yuanyuan was born in Jiangnan to a poor family with the original surname Xing (邢). After her parents died when she was young, she was adopted by her aunt and took her uncle's surname, Chen. At ten, her uncle sold her to become a courtesan. Excelling in Kunqu and Yiyang opera, and often wearing her hair in a wo duo ji (high bun, 倭堕髻), Chen became renowned as one of the Eight Beauties of Qinhuai, along with Ma Xianglan, Bian Yujing, Li Xiangjun, Dong Xiaowan, Gu Mei, Kou Baimen, and Liu Rushi. She was especially praised for her role as Hongniang in The Romance of the West Chamber by poet Zou Shu (邹枢). Chen also wrote poetry, but only three of her works have survived.

Government official Gong Ruofu (贡若甫) bought her freedom and intended to take her as a concubine, but Chen was released due to disagreements with other women in his household. In 1641, Chen had a brief relationship with the poet and calligrapher Mao Xiang (冒襄), who also intended to take her as a concubine, but before that, she was "acquired" by the powerful courtier Tian Hongyu (田弘遇), father-in-law of the Chongzhen Emperor.

Accounts of Chen's arrival in Beijing vary, citing 1641, 1642, or 1643. Mao claimed he proposed to Chen in 1641, with plans for marriage the following year. However, by spring 1642 when he went to visit her again, she had been taken away, leading to the belief that she arrived in Beijing in 1642. At that time, Tian, concerned that his daughter Tian Xiuying (田秀英) might fall out of favor, sought beautiful women in Jiangnan to win over the emperor in the interests of the Tian family. However, amid the Ming dynasty's struggles against Li Zicheng and the Manchu, the Chongzhen Emperor had little time for Chen. Three months after entering the Forbidden City, she was sent back to Tian. She then performed in his family opera troupe until she was either bought for Ming general Wu Sangui by his father or given to Wu as a gift by Tian.

In April 1644, when Beijing fell to Li Zicheng's peasant army, Wu's household in the city was captured by Li and his subordinate Liu Zongmin (刘宗敏). By various accounts, Chen was either taken as a hostage, made a concubine, or raped by them. Wu eventually allied with the Qing regent, Dorgon, allowing the Qing armies to enter China proper through Shanhai Pass. The combined forces of Wu and the Qing ousted Li's peasant army from Beijing, where the Qing dynasty then established its rule over China.

After Chen reunited with her husband, she followed him on various campaigns, ending up in Yunnan, which was awarded to Wu by the Qing rulers as part of his fiefdom. One account claims that Chen became a Buddhist nun in Kunming after she fell out of Wu's favor due to her age and disagreements with his harem.

In the 1980s, Chen's final whereabouts were uncovered by the historian Huang Tousong (黄透松), who was exiled to Guizhou in the 1970s during the Cultural Revolution. According to his research, by the end of Wu's failed rebellion against the Qing, Chen, her stepson Wu Yingqi (吴应麒), renamed as Wu Qihua (吴启华), and one of Wu Sangui's surviving grandsons were escorted by General Ma Bao (马宝) to what is now Majia Zhai (马家寨) village in Guizhou, where they lived among the ethnic minorities hostile to Qing rule. In order to prevent being tracked down by Qing forces, Chen became a nun of a temple located on another mountain in Guizhou for years. In the era of Yongzheng Emperor's reign, she returned to live in the village until her death. The knowledge of Chen's final whereabouts was passed down only by oral history of Wu Sangui's descendants living in the said village until Huang published the discovery.

A tomb was erected in the village in the sixth year of Yongzheng Emperor's reign in 1728, with the inscription: "故先妣吴门聂氏之墓位" (lit. The tomb of the late ancestress, Madam Nie of Wumen), which was intentionally cryptic to deter detection. In 1983, the stele of Chen's tomb was unearthed, and the tomb was renovated. In the late 1980s, the tomb was looted, leaving only her skeleton and 36 evenly arranged teeth. In 2005, the tomb was attributed by the government historians to Chen.

== In fiction ==
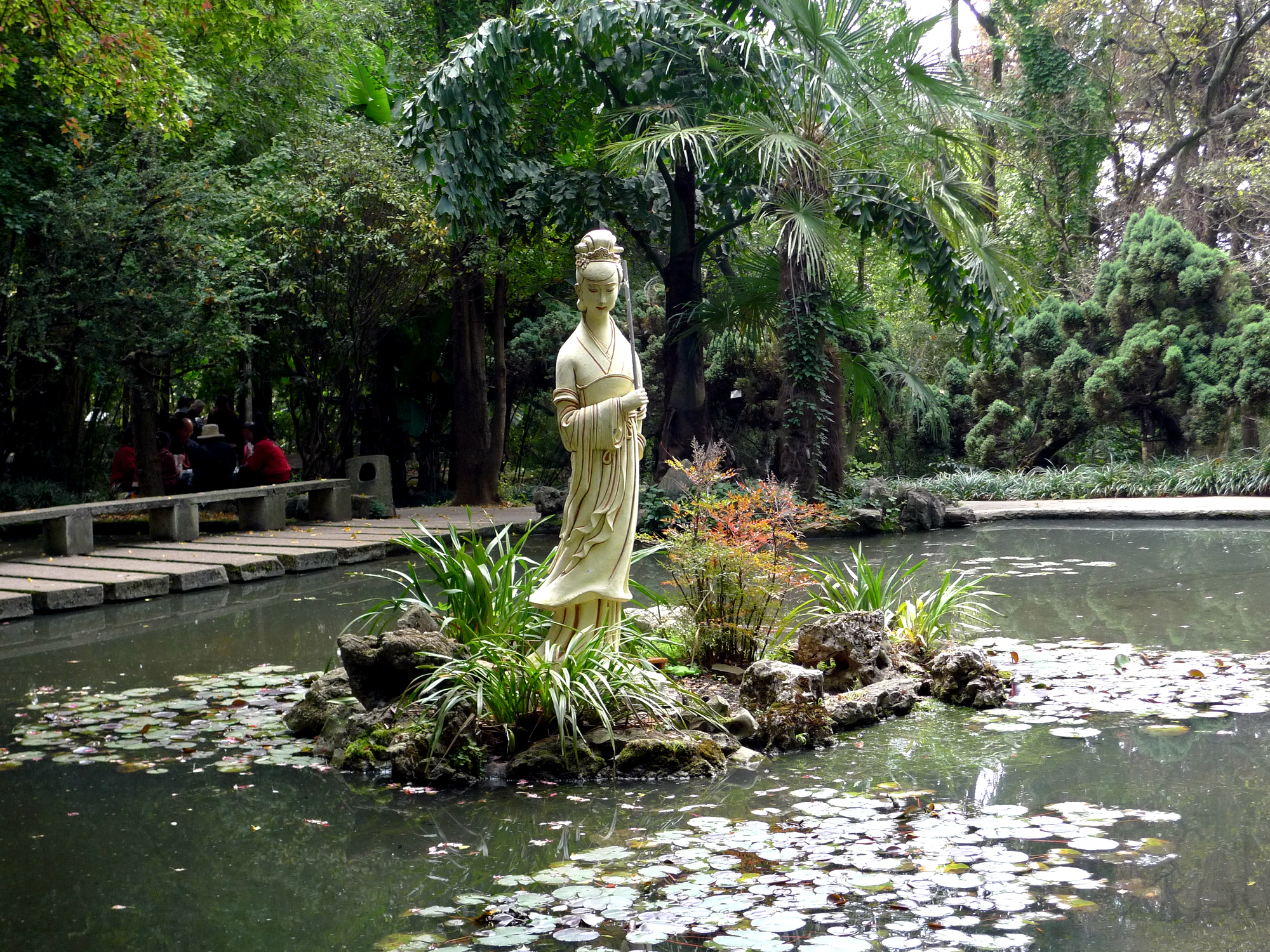
Statue of Chen in Gold Hall Park in Kunming

In Chinese folklore, Chen Yuanyuan plays a dramatic and romanticized role in the rise and fall of dynasties. According to stories that emerged during the Kangxi era, Wu Sangui's motivation for joining forces with the Qing to attack Li Zicheng was to save Chen from Li's capture. This earned Chen the notoriety of a femme fatale and Wu the label of a traitor. Although such stories proved popular, some historians regard them as products of fiction.

The story of Chen and Wu was immortalized in Wu Weiye's qu, Song of Yuanyuan:

In that time when the emperor abandoned the human world,
Wu crushed the enemy and captured the capital, bearing down from Jade Pass.
The six armies, wailing and grieving, were uniformly clad in the white of mourning,
One wave of headgear-lifting anger propelled him, all for the sake of the fair-faced one.
The fair-faced one, drifting, and fallen, was not what I longed for.
The offending bandits, smote by heaven, wallowed in wanton pleasures.
Lightning swept the Yellow Turbans, the Black Mountain troops were quelled.
Having wailed for ruler and kin, I met her again.

— Wu Weiye, excerpt from Song of Yuanyuan

== Bibliography ==
- Chang, Kang-i Sun; Owen, Stephen (2010), The Cambridge History of Chinese Literature, Volume 2, Cambridge University Press, ISBN 978-0-521-85559-4
- Huang, Ray (1997), China: A Macro History, M. E. Sharpe, ISBN 978-1-56324-731-6
- Lee, Lily Xiao Hong; Stephanowska, A.D. (1998), Biographical Dictionary of Chinese Women: The Qing Period, 1644-1911, East Gate, pp. 21–26, ISBN 0-7656-0043-9
- Lovell, Julia (2006), The Great Wall: China Against the World, 1000 BC-2000 AD, Atlantic Books, ISBN 9781843542124
- Peterson, Barbara Bennett (2000), Notable Women of China: Shang Dynasty to the Early Twentieth Century, East Gate, pp. 330–334, ISBN 0-7656-0504-X
- Spence, Jonathan D. (1990), The Search for Modern China, W. W. Norton & Company, ISBN 9780393307801
- Wakeman, Frederic Jr. (1986), The Great Enterprise: The Manchu Reconstruction of Imperial Order in Seventeenth-century China, Berkeley: University of California Press, ISBN 0520048040
- Wakeman, Frederic Jr. (2009), Telling Chinese History: A Selection of Essays, Berkeley: University of California Press, ISBN 9780520256064
- Xie 谢, Yongfang 永芳; Shi 施, Qin 琴 (2014). "像传题咏与经典重构———以《秦淮八艳图咏》为中心" [Acclaim for portraits and classical reconstruction: 'Qinhuai bayan tuyong' as the centre]. Zhongguo Wenhua Yanjiu (2): 180–188.

== See also ==
- The Deer and the Cauldron, a wuxia novel by Jin Yong in which Chen appears.
- The Green Phoenix: A Novel of the Woman Who Re-made Asia, Empress Xiaozhuang, a historical novel by Alice Poon in which Chen has a minor role.
- Tales of Ming Courtesans, a historical novel by Alice Poon in which Chen is one of the three protagonists, the other two being Liu Rushi and Li Xiangjun.
