= Wang Jia =

Wang Jia may refer to:

- Wang Jia (Taoist) (died 390), Taoist hermit and scholar during the Sixteen Kingdoms period
- Wang Zijia (1622–1657), born Wang Jia, actor during the Ming and Qing dynasties
- Wang Jia (director), Chinese film director
- Jia Wang, engineer at AT&T Labs Research
