= Dong Xiaowan =

Chinese Ming Dynasty female artist and Poet

- 董小宛
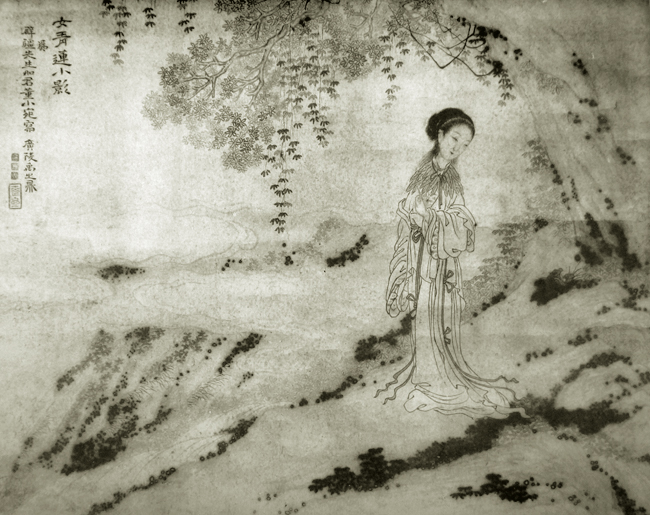
- Dong Xiaowan painted by Yu Zhiding after her death
- Born: Dong Bai 董白; 1624
- Died: December 1651 (aged 26–27); Qing China
- Occupations: courtesan, poet, writer, chef
- Partner: Mao Bijiang
- Relatives: Lady Bai (mother)
- Writing career
- Pen name: Qinglian 青蓮; Qinglian nüshi 青蓮女史
- Language: Chinese

Dong Xiaowan (1624–1651), also known as Dong Bai, was a Chinese courtesan and poet, also known by her pen name Qinglian.

Dong has been described as the famous courtesan of her time, known for her beauty and talent in singing, acting, needlework and the tea ceremony. She lived in Qinhuai District of Nanjing. Similar to other courtesans of the late Ming Dynasty, Dong's moral qualities were emphasised among her admirers more than her talents.

She is one of the Eight Beauties of Qinhuai (Chinese: 秦淮八艳) described by late Qing officials. The other famed courtesans of this group are Ma Xianglan, Bian Yujing (卞玉京), Li Xiangjun, Liu Rushi, Gu Mei, Kou Baimen (寇白門), and Chen Yuanyuan.

== Biography ==
Dong Xiaowan was born in the "Dong's Embroidery Shop" in Suzhou City. This is a well-known Suzhou embroidery shop in Suzhou. Because of the fine work, the business has always been prosperous. The Dong family is a Suzhou embroidery family. It has a history of more than 200 years. At the same time, the Dong family also has a bit of scholarly atmosphere. The hostess Bai is the only daughter of an old scholar. The old scholar has never been successful in his life, so he had to pass on his knowledge to his daughter. Lady Bai gave birth to a daughter for the Dong family. In order to express the harmonious relationship between husband and wife, she was named Dong Bai. Dong Xiaowan was regarded as a treasure by her parents, who carefully taught her poetry, calligraphy, painting, needlework. When Dong Xiaowan was thirteen, her father suffered from dysentery in the summer. The family spent a lot of money to build a house by the Bantang River, lived in seclusion with their daughter, and entrusted the embroidery shop to the shop assistant. However, the shop assistant played tricks and owed thousands of taels of silver.Lady Bai fell ill, so the fifteen-year-old Dong Xiaowan had to find a way to repay the family debt and raise medical expenses for her mother. Finally, Dong Bai came to the Qinhuai River in Nanjing to become a geji and changed her name to Dong Xiaowan. After Dong Xiaowan became a courtesan, she popular peoples because of her intelligence, beauty, excellent calligraphy and painting, and knowledge of recipes and tea ceremony. Dong Xiaowan, who was proficient in music, also co-starred with Gu Hengbo, who played a young man, in "The Story of the Western Tower(西楼记)" and "Teach Son(教子)". After that, Xiaowan left the Qinhuai sing and dance venue, she returned to Suzhou. Mao Bijiang's "Recalling Words(忆语)" wrote that Xiaowan was tired of the hustle and bustle of Qinhuai and chose to move to Bantang. Xiaowan's mother was still lying in bed and needed to see a doctor and take medicine. Some creditors heard that Xiaowan had returned home and came to collect debts. Xiaowan was unable to cope with it, so she had to become a courtesan again in her own Shuangcheng Guan(双城馆). Dong Xiaowan loved the scenery of Suzhou, and later traveled to Huangshan Mountain, West Lake and Taihu Lake. Qian Qianyi once accepted Dong Xiaowan as his apprentice, and took her to live in Huangshan with Liu Rushi, where she learned poetry and painting and achieved remarkable results.

== Marriage ==
Dong's mother died in 1642, leaving her to struggle financially. The noble Mao Bijiang (冒辟疆), alternatively known as Mao Xiang, had attempted to meet with Dong several times, but had pursued a relationship with the courtesan Chen Yuanyuan instead. After Chen was abducted by a noble associated with the imperial court, Mao visited Dong. Her mother had been dead for two weeks and Dong was quite ill. She proposed that she become his concubine and, refusing to take no for an answer, allegedly followed him for 27 days on his boat. Eventually, the two agreed to wait for Mao to pass the imperial examinations, which he failed. In order to facilitate Dong's marriage, Qian Qianyi, husband of fellow courtesan Liu Rushi, paid off her debts of 3,000 gold taels and had her name struck from the musicians' register. She then lived with Mao in Rugao as his concubine, alongside his wife Lady Su.

She has been described as an ideal dutiful, sacrificing and loyal wife and daughter-in-law during her marriage to Mao Bijiang, who as a loyalist of the Ming dynasty was persecuted after the Qing dynasty's rise to power in 1644. When Mao, Lady Su and Dong were forced to flee their home in 1644, Dong abandoned her more valuable belongings to save her writings and paintings. They stayed in Huzhou until Zhu Yousong was crowned emperor in Nanjing later in 1644. Soon after, the household moved to Zhejiang, where Dong compiled a book titled Liuyan ji (Chinese: 流宴集) about jewellery, women's costumes, pavilions and parties. Dong Xiaowan and Mao Bijiang both liked to sit quietly and taste the incense. Xiaowan treasured the "daughter's incense" which was regarded as the best by Dongguan people. She burned incense through a veil and paid attention to the flavor and mood when tasting the incense. Dong and Mao also liked to sit quietly in the incense pavilion and taste the famous incense carefully. Mao Bijiang recalled the scene of the two burning incense on cold nights in "Yingmei An Yiyu (影梅庵忆语)".

After the war, Mao Bijiang fell ill with malaria, fever and chills, diarrhea and abdominal pain. To take care of him, Dong Xiaowan spread a broken straw mat beside the bed as her own bed, and would get up immediately to check on her husband as soon as he made a noise. When he was shivering with chills, Dong Xiaowan held her husband tightly in her arms. When her husband had a fever and was irritable, she would remove the quilt and give him a bath. When he had abdominal pain, she would massage him. When he had diarrhea, she would carry a basin and untie his belt. Dong Xiaowan never looked tired. After more than five months of tossing and turning, Mao Bijiang's condition finally improved, but Dong Xiaowan was already skinny, as if she had also been seriously ill. Later, Mao Bijiang fell ill twice. Once, he had a stomach disease and bleeding, and he could not eat or drink. Dong Xiaowan boiled medicine and boiled soup in the hot summer, and stayed by his pillow for 60 days and nights. The second time, Mao Bijiang had a carbuncle on his back, which was painful and he could not lie on his back. Dong Xiaowan hugged her husband every night, let him lean on her to sleep, and she slept sitting up for a full 100 days. In the process of taking care of Mao Bijiang, her mother-in-law and Mrs. Mao wanted to replace Dong Xiaowan several times, but she refused. She said: "I can do my best to serve my husband, which is the blessing of the whole family. I am nothing. Even if I die of illness, I will be reborn after death."

== Poetry ==
Dong wrote shi and was part of the new literati movement that focussed on emotions and the motif of the heartbroken lover.Dong Xiaowan wrote a collection of poems titled "Eleven Poems in Regular Script on Autumn Boudoir Fans". In addition, she also wrote many scattered poems. The poem below demonstrates a popular emotion, melancholy, focussing on a solitary woman in secluded female quarters.

Casual Composition by the Green Window

I gaze at the flowers through ill eyes, steeped in melancholy thoughts,
Sitting alone by the secluded window, I play the jade-decorated zither.
The yellow orioles also seem to understand people's mind,
From beyond the willow they send out beautiful sounds time and again.

Original Chinese text

綠窗偶成
病眼看花愁思深，
幽窗獨坐撫瑤琴。
黃鸝亦似知人意，
柳外時時弄好音。

== Legacy ==
Dong was proficient at painting and left behind some artistic works. Her works include "Colorful Butterflies", "Lonely Mountain Feeling of Passing Away", "Ladies", "Autumn Garden Elegance", "Imitation of the Brushwork of Mr. Liuru", "Orchid Scroll" etc.

Dong Xiaowan is also a chef, she is listed among the "Top Ten Famous Chefs in Ancient China" and "Six Beautiful Chefs in Ancient China". Tiger skin meat, a Chinese dish, is also called oily meat. Because it was invented by Dong Xiaowan, it is called "Dong meat". Dong Xiaowan also made a kind of crispy candy with fine white sugar, shelled sesame, pure maltose and other flour, and asked someone to bring it from Qinhuai to Mao Bijiang to express her deep affection. Because Xiaowan's crispy candy was crispy, soft and sweet, she made it all year round to entertain guests and give it to relatives and friends. Over time, merchants imitated it and sold it on the market, calling it "Dong Candy".

After her death, Mao Bijiang published a biography of Dong's life. It was translated into English and published in 1931. In it, he emphasised Dong's skill at needlework; a skill typically associated with the domestic virtues of a wife. In contrast, he downplayed her painting abilities, which Jean Wetzel has suggested may have been an attempt to disassociate Dong from her previous life as a courtesan.

Dong has often been confused with Consort Donggo, and therefore said to have been abducted to the harem of the Emperor.

Dong's life was adapted for film by Cantonese opera playwright Tang Ti-sheng, with Fong Yim Fun portraying Dong. Her romance with Mao Bijiang has been dramatised as a Kunqu opera by the Northern Kunqu Opera Theatre.
