= Li Xiangjun =

Chinese Ming Dynasty female singer

- 李香君
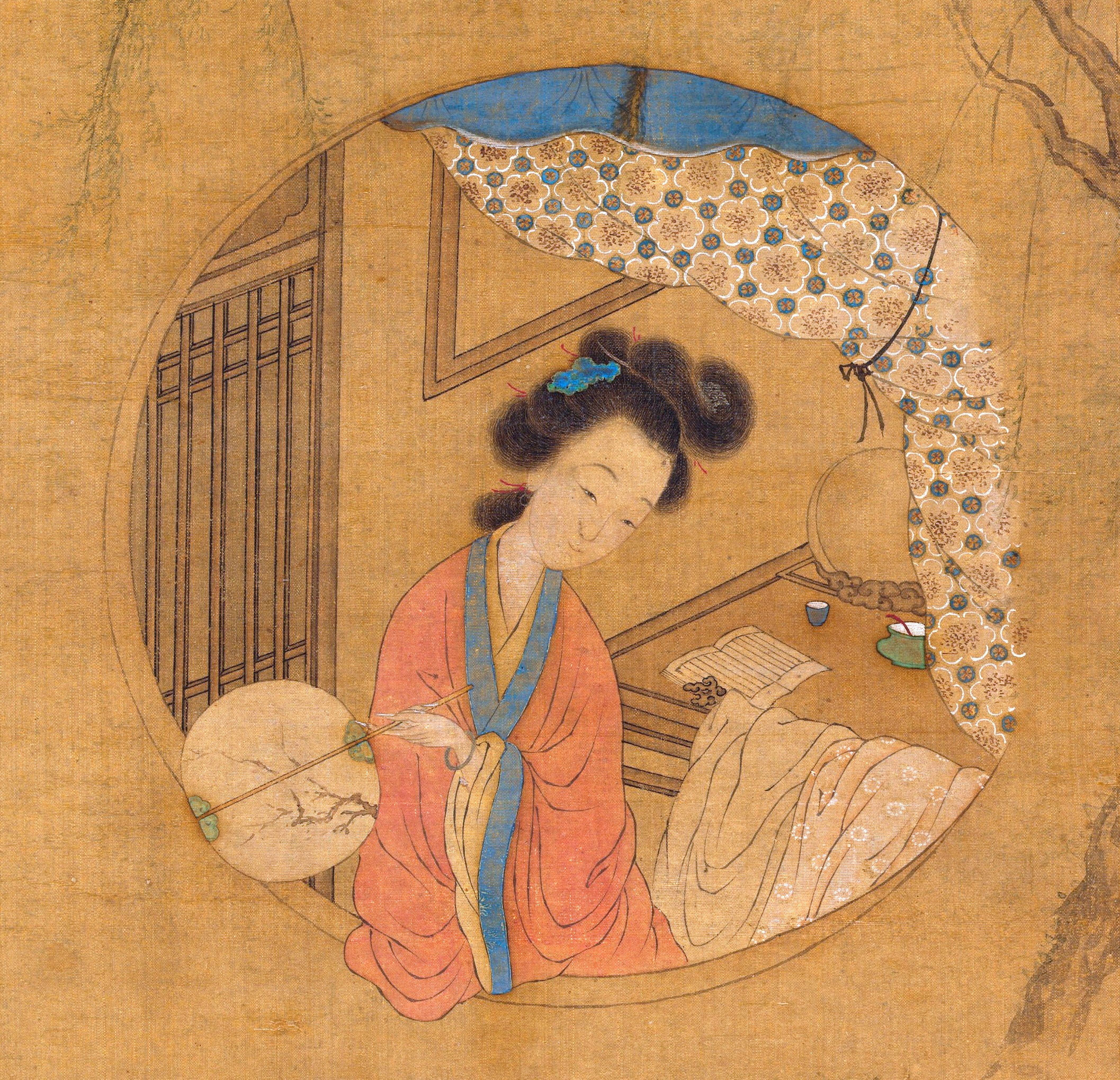
- Painting of Li Xiangjun 1817
- Born: 1624; Suzhou, Jiangsu, Ming Dynasty
- Died: 1654 (aged 29–30); Qing Dynasty
- Occupation: Gējì
- Partner: Hou Fangyu (侯方域)
- Relatives: Li Zhenli (李贞丽) (adopted mother)
- Writing career
- Pen name: Li Xiang (李香), Wu Shi (吴氏)
- Language: Chinese

Li Xiangjun (Chinese: 李香君; 1624–1654) was a celebrated gējì (courtesan) during the late Ming dynasty, renowned for her artistic talents and tragic romance with the scholar-official Hou Fangyu. Their story became immortalized in the Qing-era historical play The Peach Blossom Fan (Chinese: 桃花扇) by Kong Shangren, which dramatized their love amid the political collapse of the Ming dynasty. Regarded as one of Chinese history's most iconic romances, their relationship symbolized loyalty and resilience during a tumultuous era.

Li is memorialized as one of the Eight Beauties of Qinhuai (Chinese: 秦淮八艳), a group of distinguished gējì from Nanjing's Qinhuai district celebrated in late Qing records for their cultural influence and artistic achievements. The group included Ma Xianglan, Bian Yujing (Chinese: 卞玉京), Dong Xiaowan, Liu Rushi, Gu Mei, Kou Baimen (Chinese: 寇白门), and Chen Yuanyuan. These women transcended their roles as entertainers, engaging with literati, poets, and political figures, and leaving enduring legacies through their contributions to art, literature, and the social dynamics of the Ming-Qing transition period.

== Biography ==
=== Early years ===
Li Xiangjun, also known as Li Xiang (Chinese: 李香) or Li Ji (Chinese: 李姬), was born into the Wu family in Fengqiao, Changmen, Suzhou. Her courtesy name was Xiangshanzhui (Chinese: 香扇坠). Her father, a military attaché and member of the reformist Donglin Party, was persecuted by the eunuch faction led by Wei Zhongxian (Chinese: 魏忠贤), leading to the family's ruin. At age eight, she was adopted by the courtesan Li Zhenli (Chinese: 李贞丽), and took her surname. Raised in Meixiang Lou (Chinese: 媚香楼), a performance venue frequented by literati and loyalist officials, Li trained under musician Su Kunsheng (Chinese: 苏昆生) from age 13, mastering the pipa, poetry, and southern Chinese opera. By 16, she was acclaimed for her performances of The Peony Pavilion. Because her adoptive mother Li Zhenli was generous and elegant, most of the guests at Meixiang Lou were literati and upright, loyal ministers.

=== Marriage ===
In 1639, Hou Fangyu (Chinese: 侯方域), a leader of the Fushe Society (Chinese: 复社) and one of the "Four Masters of Fushe," (Chinese: 复社四公子), met 16-year-old Li Xiangjun at Meixiang Lou. They married, with Hou gifting her an ivory-and-silk fan inscribed with a poem. Financial support for the marriage came indirectly from Ruan Dacheng (Chinese: 阮大成), a disgraced official seeking to become an ally to Fushe scholars. Upon discovering Ruan's involvement, Li sold her jewelry to repay the debt, declaring: "Remove my dresses, it is fine to be poor; wear commoners' clothing, your reputation will be clean."

=== Blood-stained fan ===
After Hou failed the imperial examination due to his political writings, he fled Nanjing. Li vowed to cease performing and urged him to join Shi Kefa's anti-Qing resistance. Governor Tian Yang, on Ruan's recommendation, attempted to force Li into concubinage. During her resistance, blood from her injuries stained Hou's fan. The painter Yang Longyou transformed the stains into peach blossoms, creating the artifact "The Peach Blossom Fan."

=== Summon to the palace ===
After Li's recovery, Ruan Dacheng ordered Li to be a geji in the palace under the guise of an imperial order. As a commoner, Li could not disobey this imperial edict. She was unable to write to Hou due to the ongoing war. Li Xiangjun was forced into the palace with the blood-stained fan in hand.

In 1644, Qing soldiers captured Yangzhou and invaded Nanjing. Emperor Hongguang fled and was eventually kidnapped by his subordinates to be sacrificed to the Qing army. With the city of Nanjing in chaos, Li Xiangjun escaped from the palace and, from the Changban bridge, saw Meixiang Tower being burned. Li's music teacher, Su Kunsheng, eventually took her to seek refuge in Suzhou. Conincidentally, Hou Fangyu was also in Nanjing that night. He rushed to Qinhuai River in search of Li Xiangjun, only to see Meixiang Tower on fire.

In 1645, Li Xiangjun became a Taoist nun with her former geji friend Bian Yujing at the Baozhen Temple, Qixia Mountain. Li eventually fell ill. At her sick bed, Li asked Bian to cut a lock of her hair, wrap it in a red head scarf, and tie it to her fan to be handed to Hou Fangyu. Her parting words were, "Guard the integrity of the Ming Dynasty; never work for the Manchus. I will remember your love, even in death."

=== Entering the Hou family ===
In the autumn of 1645, Hou Fangyu found Li Xiangjun in Qixia Mountain and returned them north to Shangqiu. Concealing her geji identity, Li moved into the Xiyuan Feicui Building as Hou Fangyu's concubine, reclaiming her former surname, Wu. She lived in harmony with her parents-in-law and also respected Hou Fangyu's first wife. Li and Hou often performed poetry and pipa as a couple at the Zhuanghuitang Hall.

From 1645 to 1652, Li Xiangjun lived a peaceful and comfortable life. When Hou Fangyu was away in Nanjing, the Hou family learned of Li's past identity as a geji and decided they could no longer tolerate her in the household. Her father-in-law, Hou Xun, chased Li out of the Feicui Building and reluctantly allowed her to live in a desolate village fifteen miles from the city. After learning of Li's pregnancy and hearing sympathetic pleas from her mother-in-law and Mrs. Chang, Hou Xun reluctantly sent a servant for Li Xiangjun. Li gave birth to a boy who was taken away by the Hou family.

=== Death ===
After his return, Hou Fangyu begged his father to withdraw his order, but was repeatedly reprimanded. Li Xiangjun fell into depression and died of tuberculosis at the age of thirty. Hou Fangyu erected a stele that inscribed: "Wife died with hatred, husband ashamed for life." In front of the stele was a stone table and column stool named "stone stool of regret". Hou often visited Li's tomb and sat on the stool for a long time. On 13 December 1654, Hou died of depression, aged 37. Because of Li's status, she was not allowed to be buried with Hou Fangyu.

== Residence ==
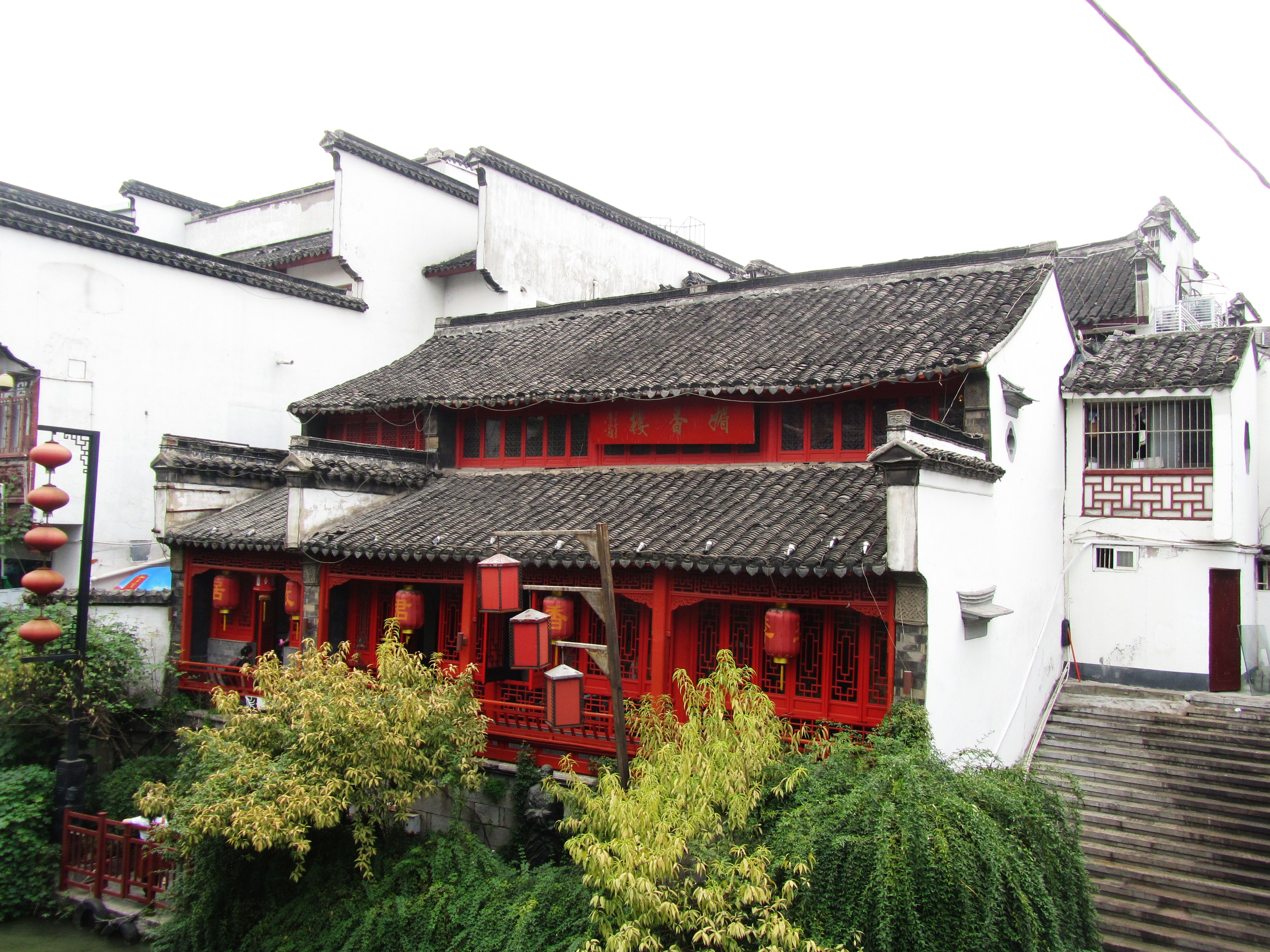
Memorial Hall to Li Xiangjun

The residence of Li Xiangjun (Chinese: 李香君故居) is open to the public as part of Nanjing's literary cultural heritage. It is located in Nanjing, in the vicinity of Fuzimiao on the Qinhuai River.
