= Zijie =

Zijie may refer to:

- Bytedance (字节), a Chinese internet technology company
- Chen Zijie, a Chinese footballer
- Tien Tzu-chieh, a badminton player from Taiwan
- Wang Zijia, a Chinese kunqu actor of the Ming–Qing transition
- Wang Zijie, a Chinese épée fencer
- Zijie Yan, an associate professor at the University of North Carolina murdered on campus
- Zong Zijie, a Chinese actor based in Singapore
