= Wang Zijia =

Wang Zijia (Chinese: 王紫稼; pinyin: Wáng Zǐjià or Chinese: 王子嘉; pinyin: Wáng Zǐjiā, 1622–1657) or Wang Zijie (Chinese: 王子玠; pinyin: Wáng Zǐjiè), born Wang Jia (Chinese: 王稼; pinyin: Wáng Jià), was a Chinese kunqu actor of the Ming–Qing transition who played dan roles (i.e. he impersonated women). He "mesmerize[d] a new generation of youths after the fall of the Ming" and befriended some of the leading scholars such as Gong Dingzi, Qian Qianyi, and Wu Weiye.

Originally from Suzhou, Wang first joined the household troupe of the scholar-official Xu Qian. After the Ming government disbanded Xu's troupe, Wang joined the household troupe of Xu's nemesis Tu Guobao before heading to Beijing to try his luck.

When he returned from Beijing, Wang Zijia was flogged to death on the order of the Suzhou censor Li Senxian (李森先) — who was his admirer but also a "moral zealot" — for allegedly corruption morality.

== In fiction ==
Wang Zijia's rise and fall formed one of the main storylines of the Qing dynasty novel Wutong Ying (梧桐影, "The Parasol's Shade").

Kunqu actor Li Gonglü (李公律) played Wang Zijia in the 2005 TV series The Romantic King of Dramas (風流戲王).
