= Ye Yanlan =

Qing dynasty politician

- 葉衍蘭
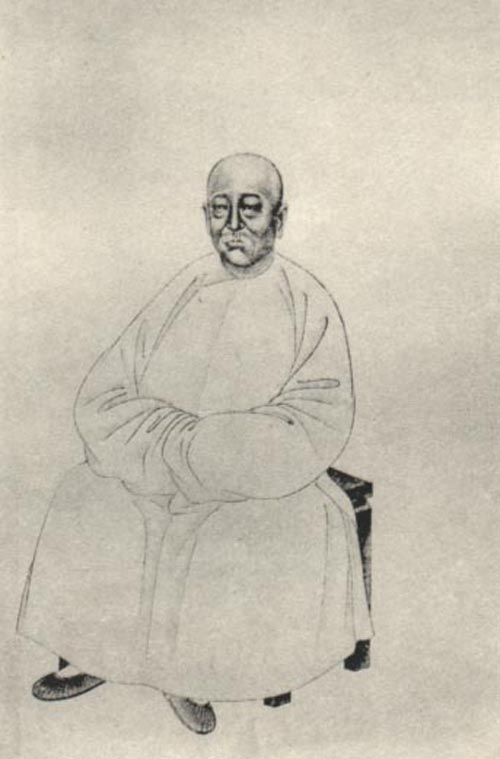
- Born: 1823; Panyu County, Guangdong, China
- Died: 1897/1898
- Relatives: Ye Gongchuo (grandson)

Ye Yanlan (simplified Chinese: 叶衍兰; traditional Chinese: 葉衍蘭; pinyin: Yè Yǎnlán, 1823–1897/1898) was a Chinese poet, painter, calligrapher, and official in the Qing dynasty. Born in Panyu County, Guangdong, he attended the Yuehua Academy and Xuehai Academy before taking the imperial examination, earning the title of juren in 1852 and the title of jinshi in 1856. Before his retirement in 1882, he had worked at the Hanlin Academy and headed the Ministry of Revenue. He spent his post-retirement career as a teacher at the Yueha Academy.

An avid collector of art, Ye produced collections depicting the Eight Beauties of Qinhuai, Ming- and Qing-dynasty literati, and prominent Qing leaders. He also wrote numerous poems, gaining recognition as one of Guangdong's best ci writers. His calligraphy was noted for its refined brushwork.

== Biography ==
Ye was born in Panyu County, Guangdong, in 1823. His father, Ye Yinghua, had been a noted lyricist who also produced numerous paintings of orchids. He took up poetry at a young age, studying under Zhang Weiping. While attending the Yuehua Academy (越華書院), he gained attention for a series of twelve works known collectively as the Mandarin Duck Poems, which were widely discussed in contemporary poetry circles. Ye also attended the Xuehai Academy, under the tutelage of Chen Li.

As an adult, Ye took the courtesy name Nanxue (南雪, meaning "Southern Snow"). He completed the provincial examination, gaining the title of juren in 1852, followed by the imperial examination in 1856, gaining the title of jinshi. Ye therefore became an official in the Qing dynasty. He first worked at the Hanlin Academy and later became the magistrate for Jiujiang, Jianxi. He later headed the Ministry of Revenue and served as secretary of the military.

Living and operating in Beijing, Ye interacted frequently with artists and bureaucrats and built an extensive art collection. He collected numerous antiquities, showing a fondness for early inscriptions and bronzes and works from the Song dynasty. Ye had one wife, six concubines, and several sons, with some of his sons entering the bureaucracy. His son Ye Peiqiang (葉佩瑲), for instance, became a muyou (legal specialist) in Shandong.

Ye retired from the government in 1882, deciding to return to Guangdong with his family; according to the family's oral tradition, he was dismissed for speaking Cantonese in front of the Manchu emperor. Ye returned to the Yuehua Academy as a teacher, then later as its director. With Zhang Jingqi, Ye produced a book titled Qinhuai Bayan Tuyong (秦淮八豔圖詠) in 1892. Detailing the Eight Beauties of Qinhuai, it included portraits and biographies of each woman by Ye as well as lyrical poetry by Ye and Zhang. Ye died in 1897 or 1898.

== Legacy ==
While in Beijing, Ye collected 171 portraits of Qing-dynasty scholars, ranging from the 16th century through the 19th century. He created reproductions of these works, either by himself or through a hired copy-painter, and added notes for each one. These were eventually published by his grandson, Ye Gongchuo, in 1928 as Portraits of Scholars of the Qing Dynasty. A second volume, completed solely by Ye Gongchuo, followed in 1953. Regarding Ye's portrait of the philosopher Dai Zhen, the historian Minghui Hu notes an "eerie sense of photorealism", which he attributes to Ye's interest in the emerging art of photography. A similar album, documenting Chinese literati from the Ming and Qing dynasties, is held by the National Museum of China and was the subject of an exhibition in 2022.

The Ye family collection of art was maintained for several further generations, with Ye Gongchuo adding extensively to it. In 2003, Ye's great-grandchildren Max Yeh and Yeh Tung donated 135 paintings and works of calligraphy to the Asian Art Museum in San Francisco. These included the Yinfu Jing by 7th-century calligrapher Chu Suiliang as well as the Duojing Lou by the 11th-century artist Mi Fu.

== Analysis ==
Ye learned from Zhang Weiping, a poet from Panyu. His early poetry also showed the influences of Jiang Kui and Zhang Yan. In his youth, he was recognized for the Mandarin Duck Poems. One, quoted in the Southern Metropolis Daily, reads:

Chinese

文采翩翩絕世才
棲身池館亦蒿萊
湖邊翡翠傷心侶
江上芙蓉薄命胎
雲水為家雙宿慣
穠華被服五銖裁
生涯畢竟煙波好
不羨鯨魚跋浪開

English

A gifted writer of extraordinary talent
Living in a pond pavilion, covered with weeds
A sad couple of emeralds by the lake
A fateful lotus on the river
The clouds and water his home, and he lives alongside
A gorgeous quilt made of five-zhu cloth
Life is better in the mist and waves, after all
I don't envy the whales that travel on the waves

Imagery of the moon and flowers was common in his poetry. Some later works, however, responded to contemporary political developments. With the destruction of the Beiyang Fleet during the First Sino-Japanese War, he wrote a poem titled "Bodhisattva" (菩薩蠻), which saw wide circulation.

Ye became known as one of the three masters of ci in Guangdong, together with Wang Quan and Shen Shiliang. In his preface to Ye's collection Haiyun Pavilion Poetry Collection (海雲閣詩鈔), the poet Wang Quan described his works as "clear and rich, ornate, with an unconcealed spirit; strict in rhythm, but unconstrained in talent". (Note: Original: "清而實腴，麗而有則，富於藻采，而性靈不為所掩；嚴於格律，而才氣不為所拘。") Other literary publications by Ye included Qiu Meng An Poetry Notes (秋夢庵詩鈔) and Qiu Meng An Poems (秋夢庵詞).

In his calligraphy, Ye was noted for his refined brushwork. He specialized in ancient seals, semi-cursive script, and regular script.

== Works cited ==
- Hu, Minghui (2015). China's Transition to Modernity: The New Classical Vision of Dai Zhen. University of Washington Press. ISBN 978-0-295-80606-8.
- Huang Qian (黄茜) (14 June 2022). "展示明清肖像画独特魅力，五十余件佳作"容曜丹青"" [Showcasing the unique charm of Ming and Qing portraits, more than 50 masterpieces of "Rong Yao Danqing"]. Southern Metropolis Daily (in Chinese). Archived from the original on 26 September 2024 – via 163.com.
- Knight, Michael; Li, He (2006). The Elegant Gathering: The Yeh Family Collection. Asian Art Museum. ISBN 978-0-939117-33-8.
- Li, Wai-yee (2005). "Women as Emblems of Dynastic Fall in Qing Literature". In Wang, David Der-wei; Wei, Shang (eds.). Dynastic Crisis and Cultural Innovation: From the Late Ming to the Late Qing and Beyond. pp. 93–150. doi:10.1163/9781684174140_005. ISBN 978-1-68417-414-0.
- Miles, Steven B. (2007). "Out of Place: Education and Identity among Three Generations of Urban Panyu Gentry, 1850–1931". Twentieth-Century China. 32 (2): 33–59. doi:10.1179/tcc.2007.32.2.33.
- Moore, Oliver (2021). Photography in China: Science, Commerce and Communication. Routledge. ISBN 978-1-000-18247-7.
- Weddington, Diane (20 April 2006). "Exquisite Asian art shows need two viewings". Oakland Tribune. Oakland, CA. p. 1.
- Yan Jiasen (严家森) Ma Xiao (马潇) (5 August 2003). "[祖孙篇 叶衍兰 叶恭绰] 进则为达官，退亦是名士" [[Grandparents and Grandchildren: Ye Yanlan and Ye Gongchuo] If You Advance, You Will Be a High Official; If You Retreat, You Will Be a Famous Scholar]. Southern Metropolis Daily (in Chinese). Archived from the original on 12 August 2022 – via Guangdong Library.
- Yeh, Max (2006a). "The Yeh Family Collection". The Elegant Gathering: The Yeh Family Collection. Asian Art Museum. pp. 1–14. ISBN 978-0-939117-33-8.
- Yeh, Wen-Hsin (2006b). "Living with Art: The Yeh Family Collection in Modern Chinese History". The Elegant Gathering: The Yeh Family Collection. Asian Art Museum. pp. 15–20. ISBN 978-0-939117-33-8.
