= Mao Jin =

17th century bibliophile and private publisher

Mao Jin (毛晋, c. 1599-~1659), courtesy name Zijin; art name Qianzai, Yinhu, a native of Jiangsu, Changshu, was a late Ming dynasty bibliophile and private publisher, renowned for his library and publishing house "Jigu Ge"(汲古阁).

== Life and work ==
Born in the twenty-seventh year of the Wanli reign of the Ming dynasty (c. 1599) into a wealthy family, Mao Jin received early education under the guidance of Qian Qianyi. At the age of thirteen, he enrolled in a government-run school and at twenty-six, he was selected as a Xiucai (a title granted to those who passed the provincial-level examination). Subsequently, he participated in the imperial examinations organized by the central government but did not succeed.

His family amassed a collection of over eighty-four thousand volumes of books, mostly Song and Yuan woodblock editions. Mao Jin established two private libraries and publishing houses, named Jigu Ge (汲古阁) and Mugeng Lou (目耕楼), respectively. He meticulously proofread and printed books including the Thirteen Classics (十三经), the Seventeen History Books (十七史), Jindai Mishu (津逮秘书, a collection of short essays particularly those of the Song dynasty), and the Sixty Varieties of Music tunes (六十种曲), just to a name a few. His publishing house printed over 600 books during a period of 40 years, covering a variety of genres including the classics, history, fictions, verses, short essays, etc. His printed editions gained wide circulation and made him a foremost private publisher throughout the empirical dynasties. Particularly fond of transcribing and engraving rare esoteric texts, his copies were of exceptional quality, earning a reputation as "Mao Chao" (毛钞, the Mao Jin edition).

Mao compiled and edited a number of collections, including Mao Shi Lu Shu Guang Yao (毛詩序), also known as Mao Shi Xu, an annotated Shi Jing collection, which is itself a poetry commentary; Su Mi Zhi Lin (苏米志林), anecdotes and fun stories about Su Shi and Mi Fu; Haiyu Gujin Wenyuan (海虞古今文苑), a collection of literati's works from the Changshu area of Jiangsu Province; Mao Shi Ming Wu Kao (毛诗名物考), verifications on names and items appearing in Mao Shi Xu; Ming Shi Ji Shi (明诗纪事), and Yin Hu Ti Ba (隐湖题跋, A postscripts collection of Yinhu) - throughout his life, Mao Jin proofread and engraved more than two hundred volumes of classics and historical texts. For each book he proofread and engraved, he wrote a postscript appended to the end of the book. Later, these postscripts were compiled into a book titled Yin Hu Ti Ba.

Mao Jin devoted his entire life to book printing. After completing the printing of the Thirteen Classics and the Seventeen History Books, he remarked, "Looking back over the past thirty years, I have handled far too many books. I have been so busy that I didn't notice the changing seasons. I didn't know when I went out during the day, and I didn't know when I closed the door at night. Now my hair is all grey, and my eyesight is all blurred. Yet, I refused to stop, fearing that I may fail to live up to my mother's teaching to read all the good books in the world." In his later years, he once said to his son, "I have lived frugally, tirelessly treating publishing books as my top priority. Now I have accumulated one hundred thousand engraved printing plates, which is truly not a small amount."
