= Qian Qianyi =

Chinese poet and historian (1582–1664)

- 錢謙益
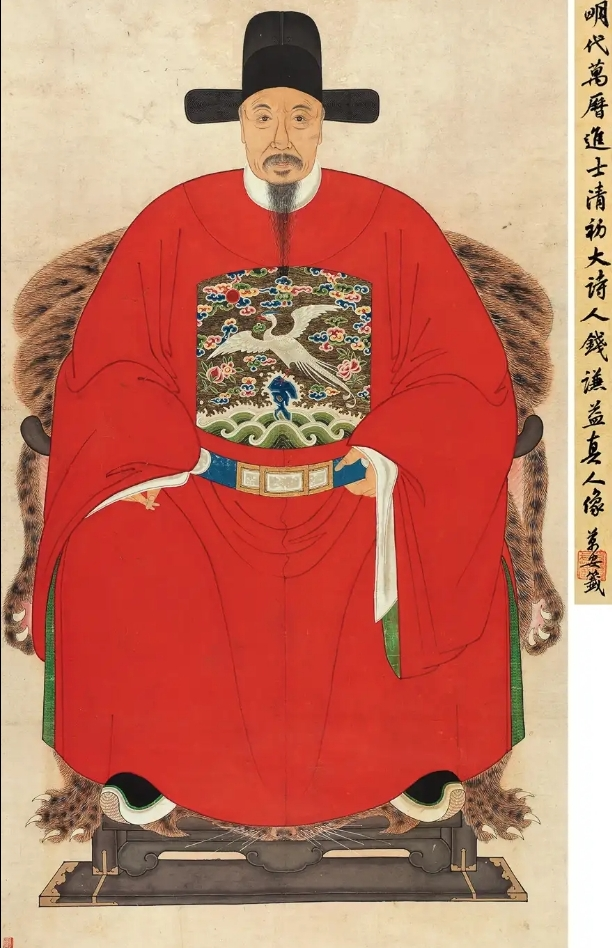
- Born: October 22, 1582; Changsu, South Zhili, Ming Empire
- Died: June 17, 1664 (aged 81); Changsu, Jiangnan, Qing Empire
- Political party: Donglin movement
- Spouse: Liu Rushi
- Parent(s): Qian Shiyang; Lady Gu
- Relatives: Qian Liu (ancestor); Qian Shunshi (grandfather)

Qian Qianyi (traditional Chinese: 錢謙益; simplified Chinese: 钱谦益; pinyin: Qián Qiānyì; Wade–Giles: Ch'ien Ch'ien-i; Suzhou dialect: Wu Chinese pronunciation: [zi tɕʰi ɪʔ]; 1582–1664) was a Chinese historian, poet, and politician during the late Ming dynasty. Qian was a famous author and poet; and along with Gong Dingzi and Wu Weiye was known as one of the Three Masters of Jiangdong.

== Biography ==
Qian was born in Changshu county of Suzhou prefecture (now in Jiangsu province). His courtesy name was "Shouzhi" (受之) and his pseudonyms were "Muzhai" (牧齋) and later "Mengsou" (蒙叟). He passed the imperial examination in 1610 at the age of 28.

Qian knew many independent women from entertainment and artistic circles, whom he treated as equals. One was Ma Ruyu from Nanking, a consummate actress. She had had a good formal education. In addition she could paint and produce calligraphy in the square style. In her time she intimidated the male literati around her. Like many others of her kind, she abandoned her stage life and took up religion, building a Buddhist retreat. Another was Liu Rushi (1618–1684), who became his consort after he was impressed by her accomplishments. He treated her as his intellectual equal and companion on travels and social gatherings. Her poetry was preserved by Qian. Qian had important ties to the local writers and artists in the Jiading and Kunshan area outside modern Shanghai. In one case, he assisted Liu Rushi's fellow famous courtesan Dong Xiaowan to marry nobleman Maoxiang(冒襄) by paying off her 3,000 gold taels worth of debt and having her name struck from the musicians register.

Preceding this generation of individuals was the prose master Gui Youguang (1507–1571) who opposed the classicists headed by Wang Shizhen (1526–1590). The antagonism to the classicist school would continue throughout the life and writings of Qian Qianyi himself.

In 1644, Qian taught an excellent student in Nanjing: Koxinga (Zheng Chenggong), who would later defeat and expel the Dutch from Taiwan.

== Works ==
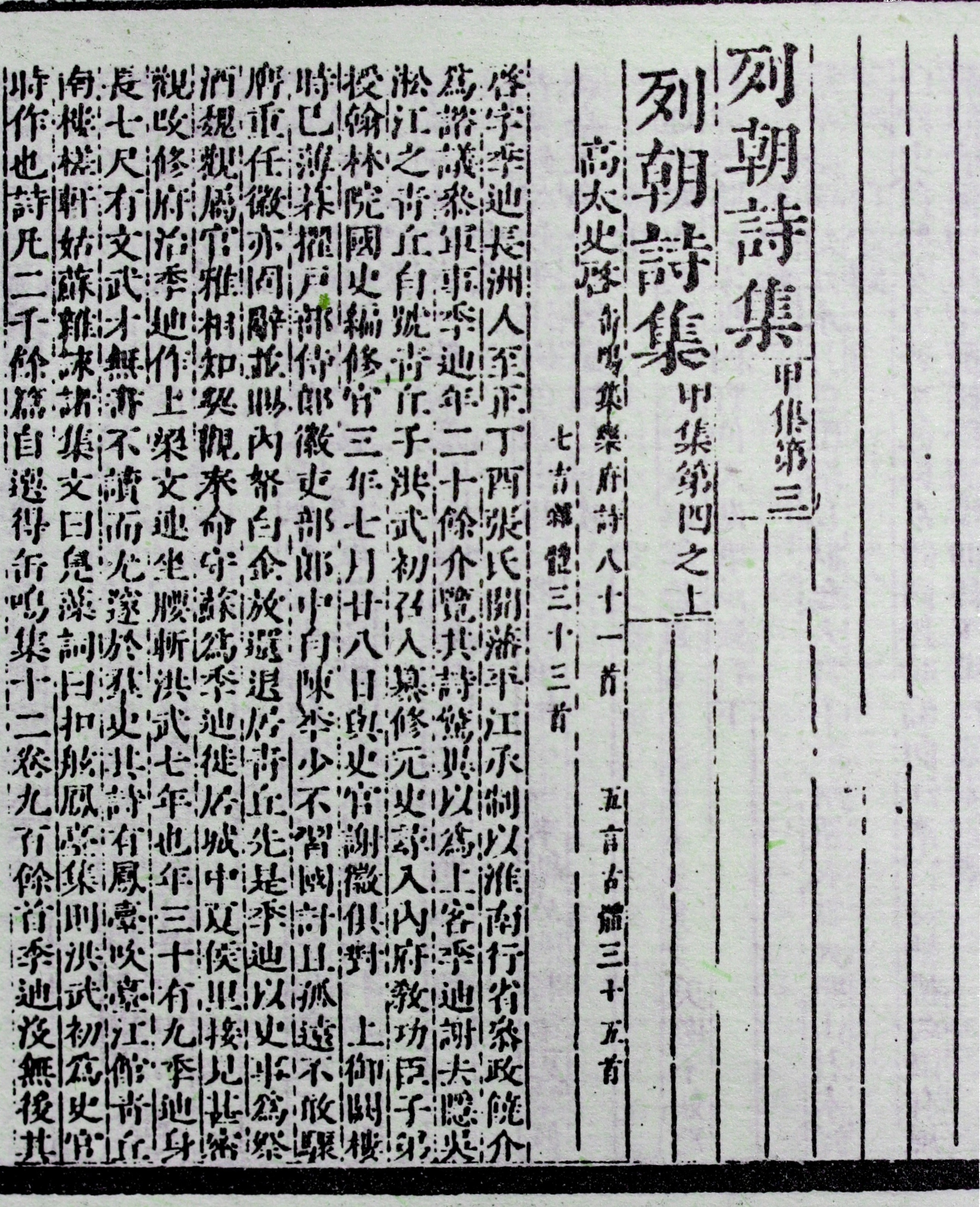
Original Mao Jin Edition of Liechao shiji

His principal work and contribution to period history was the Liechao shiji 列朝詩集 (Lieh-ch'ao shih-chi), originally a lengthy anthology of poetry with attached biographies. At present the biographies alone are printed and the work has become an unmatched history of individuals from the middle and lower strata of 16th- and 17th-century Chinese society. His father gave him special instruction in historic classics. Qian showed an early interest in the classic Shishuo xinyu, a work of historical anecdotes. Like Qian Qianyi himself, others of his circle were closely involved in education and the revival of the study of antiquity as the basis of learning. Qian's Liechao shiji was published by his associate and printer Mao Jin, who like Qian himself, showed a concern for poorer scholars. Mao used money from his printing for charitable work and needy scholars.
