= Three Masters of Jiangdong =

The Three Masters of Jiangdong (simplified Chinese: 江东三大家; traditional Chinese: 江東三大家) were a group of Chinese literati who lived and wrote during the Ming-Qing transition. They were Gong Dingzi, Wu Weiye, Qian Qianyi. They are partly famous for reviving the Ci (poetry) style of Classical Chinese poetry.

== See also ==
- Classical Chinese poetry
- Classical Chinese poetry forms

== Notes ==
=== References ===
- Zhang, Hongsheng (2002). "Gong Dingzi and the Courtesan Gu Mei: Their Romance and the Revival of the Song Lyric in the Ming-Qing Transition", in Hsiang Lectures on Chinese Poetry, Volume 2, Grace S. Fong, editor. (Montreal: Center for East Asian Research, McGill University).
