= Gong Dingzi =

Chinese poet and politician (1615–1673)

Gong Dingzi (龔鼎孶) (1615 – 1673) was a Chinese poet and politician. He was a famous author and Classical Chinese poet. He was also a government official serving under the Ming Chongzhen Emperor, the short-lived Dashun regime of peasant-rebel Li Zicheng, and then the Manchu-led Qing dynasty. Along with Wu Weiye and Qian Qianyi, Gong Dingzi was famous as one of the Three Masters of Jiangdong.

== Biography ==
Passing the Imperial Civil Service Examinations for the Jiangnan Region as a top candidate in 1641, Gong Dingzi was posted to the capital city Beijing. On his way, he met his future bride, Gu Mei, who was one of the famous courtesan of the Qinhuai River district of Jiankang (modern Nanjing).

By 1642, Gong was serving in the government administration in Beijing, where his impeachments of government ministers and criticism of imperial policies angered the Chongzhen Emperor, who had him imprisoned, in horrible circumstances. Released in early Spring, 1644, he was reunited with Gu Mei. Shortly afterwards the capital was first sacked by the peasant army led by Li Zicheng, and then seized by the Manchu forces which poured in through the Shanhai Pass and proceeded to establish the Qing dynasty. Throughout this, Gong Dingzi managed to keep up his literary creativity.

== Works ==
Among other works, Gong Dingzi's White Willow Gate (Baimen liu) collection of ci (song lyric) poetry survives.

== See also ==
- Battle of Shanhai Pass
- Zhu Yizun

== Notes ==
=== References ===
- Zhang, Hongsheng [張宏生] (2002). "Gong Dingzi and the Courtesan Gu Mei: Their Romance and the Revival of the Song Lyric in the Ming-Qing Transition", in Hsiang Lectures on Chinese Poetry, Volume 2, Grace S. Fong, editor. (Montreal: Center for East Asian Research, McGill University).
- Hummel, Arthur W. Sr., ed. (1943). "Kung Ting-tzŭ" . Eminent Chinese of the Ch'ing Period. United States Government Printing Office.
