= Yu Zhiding =

Chinese painter (1647–1709)

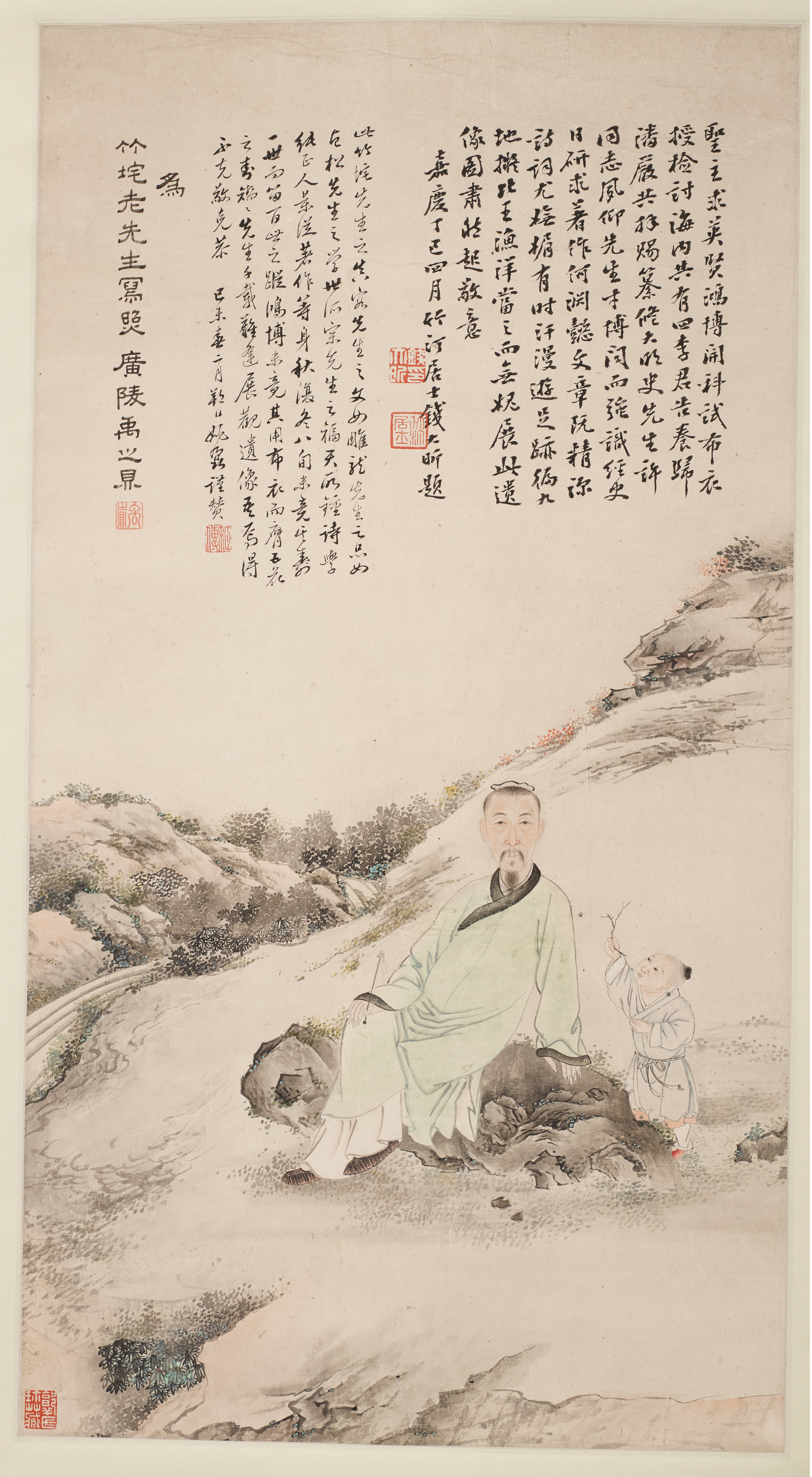
Yu Zhiding - Portrait of Zhu Yizun

Yu Zhiding (Yü Chih-ting, traditional: 禹之鼎, simplified: 禹之鼎); ca. (1647–1709) was a Chinese painter during the Qing dynasty (1644–1912).

Yu was a native of Jiangdu (present-day Yangzhou) in Jiangsu province. His style name was 'Shangji' (上吉) and his sobriquet was 'Shenzai' (慎齋). He served in the Imperial Painting Academy (廷畫院) during the reign of the Kangxi Emperor, and his skills were valued by many noted contemporaries, including Chen Tingjing, Xu Qianxue, and Gao Shiqi, all of whom ordered portraits and other paintings from him. Yu was taught by Lan Ying and painted landscapes, human figures, and bird-and-flower paintings. He retired from office in 1690 and settled in Taihu, Jiangsu.
