= Zhu Yizun =

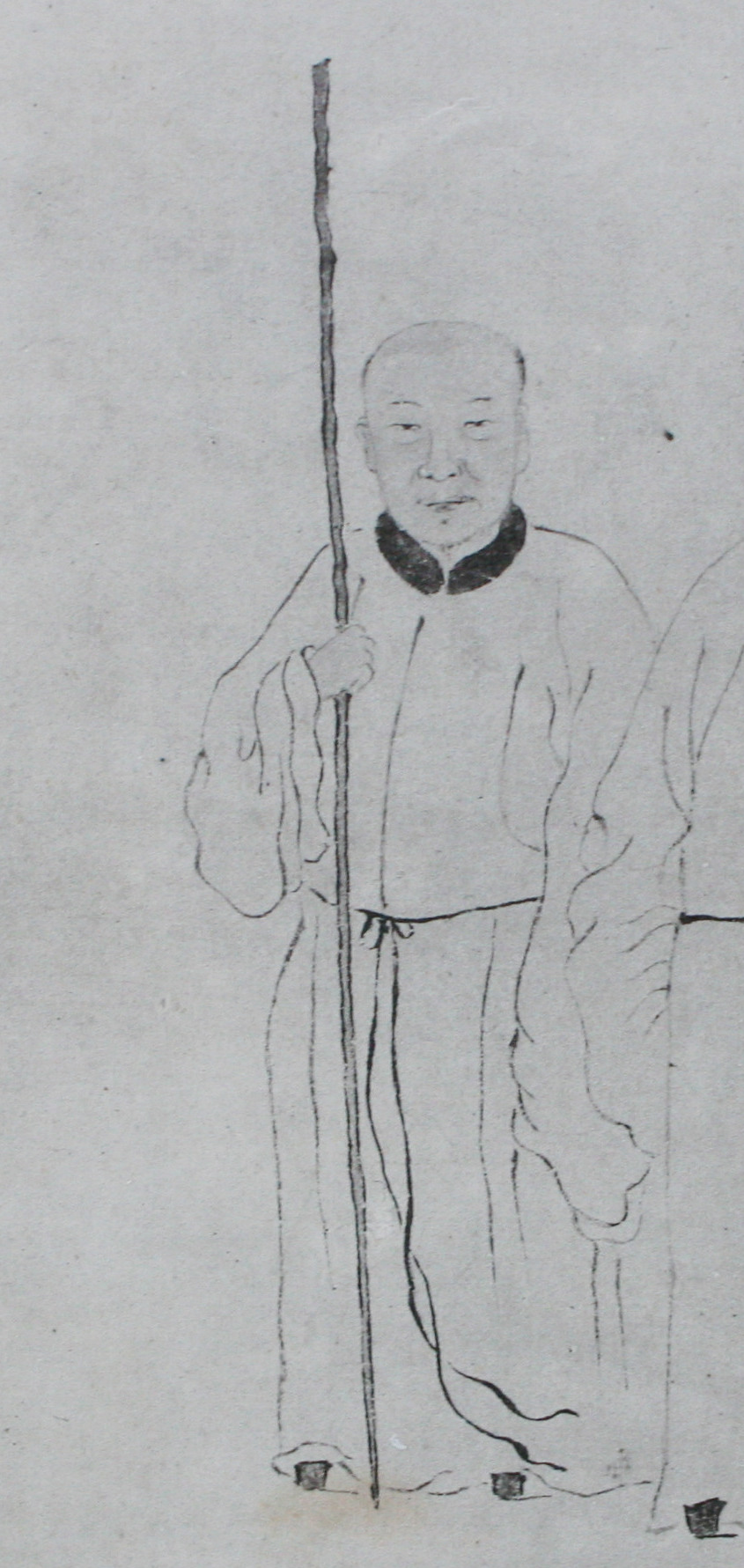
Portrait by Zhu Henian

Zhu Yizun (Chinese: 朱彝尊; pinyin: Zhū Yízūn; Wade–Giles: Chu I-tsun; 7 October 1629 – 14 November 1709) was an author and poet during the Qing dynasty. In his early literary career, Zhu was recognized for his talent and helped by Gong Dingzi. Zhu became the founder of the Zhexi school of ci poetry (song lyrics). Zhu Yizun was particularly influenced in this regard by the work of the Southern Song ci of Jiang Kui and Zhang Yan. Ming Sizong Chongzhen two years (1629) August 21 (October 7), Zhu Yizun was born in Jiaxing Biyi Fang

== Works ==
Among other works, Zhu Yizun's Jingzhiju qinqu collection of ci (song lyric) poetry survives. The Jingzhiju qinqu describes his illicit love for his younger sister-in-law, Shouchang. It has been considered to be an important mile-stone in the development of the yan style of ci (豔詞).

He has written 80 volumes of "Bai Shu Ting Collection", 42 volumes of "Old News under the Sun", 300 volumes of "Jing Yi Examination". Selected 100 volumes of Ming Poetry Summary and 36 volumes of Ci Summary (added by Wang Sen). The compilation of Ci Zong is an important anthology of Chinese Ci studies.

== Notes ==
=== References ===
- Zhang, Hongsheng (2002). "Gong Dingzi and the Courtesan Gu Mei: Their Romance and the Revival of the Song Lyric in the Ming-Qing Transition", in Hsiang Lectures on Chinese Poetry, Volume 2, Grace S. Fong, editor. (Montreal: Center for East Asian Research, McGill University).
- Hummel, Arthur W. Sr., ed. (1943). "Chu I-tsun" . Eminent Chinese of the Ch'ing Period. United States Government Printing Office.
