= Wu Weiye =

Chinese writer (1609–1671)

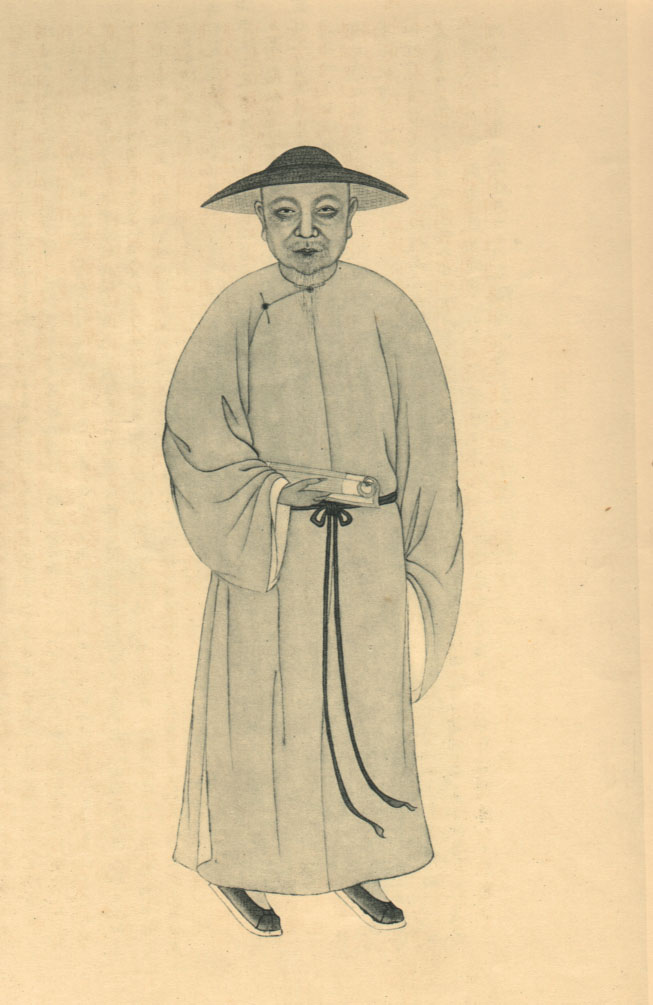
Wu Weiye (吳偉業)

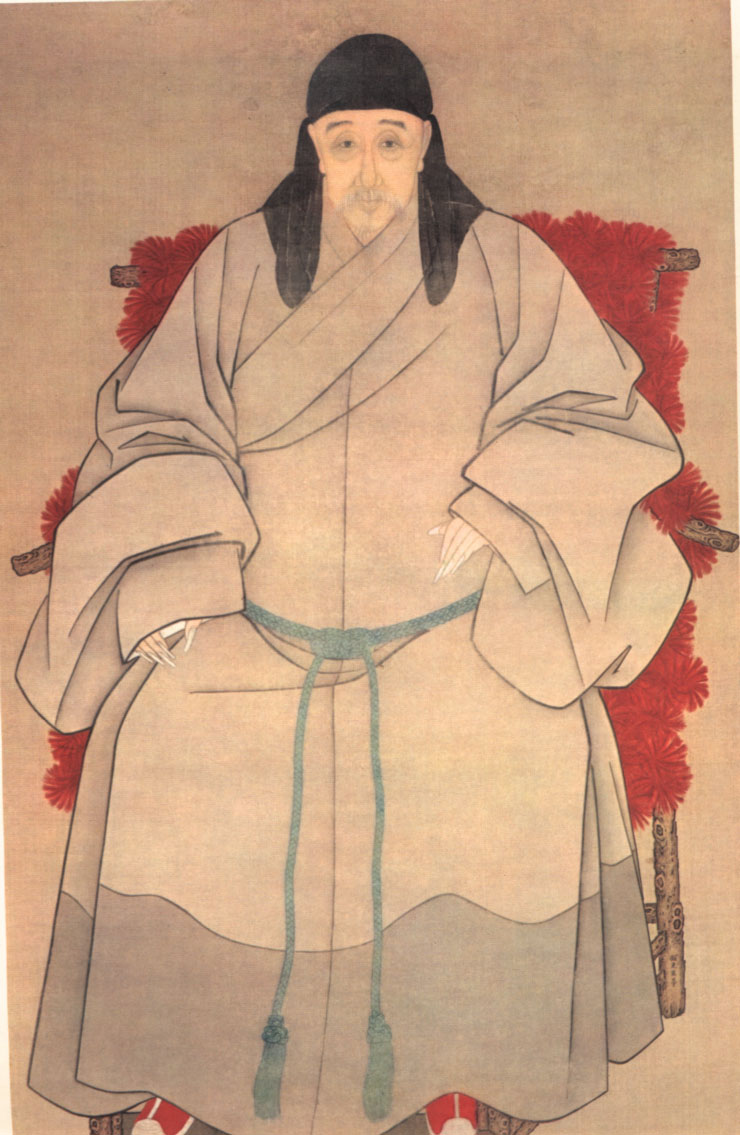
Wu Weiye

Wu Weiye (traditional Chinese: 吳偉業; simplified Chinese: 吴伟业; pinyin: Wú Wěiyè; 1609–1671) was a Chinese poet and politician. He was a poet in Classical Chinese poetry. He lived during the difficult times of the Ming-Qing transition. Along with Gong Dingzi and Qian Qianyi, Wu Weiye was famous as one of the Three Masters of Jiangdong. Wu Weiye was known for writing in the ci (song lyric) poetry form as well as writing about current events in both the regular ci and the seven-syllable long form, the gexing.

== Notes ==
=== References ===
- Zhang, Hongsheng (2002). "Gong Dingzi and the Courtesan Gu Mei: Their Romance and the Revival of the Song Lyric in the Ming-Qing Transition", in Hsiang Lectures on Chinese Poetry, Volume 2, Grace S. Fong, editor. (Montreal: Center for East Asian Research, McGill University). Jonathan Chaves (1986). The Columbia Book of Later Chinese Poetry. (New York: Columbia University Press).
- Hummel, Arthur W. Sr., ed. (1943). "Wu Wei-yeh" . Eminent Chinese of the Ch'ing Period. United States Government Printing Office.
