= Liu Rushi =

Chinese Ming Dynasty artist and poet

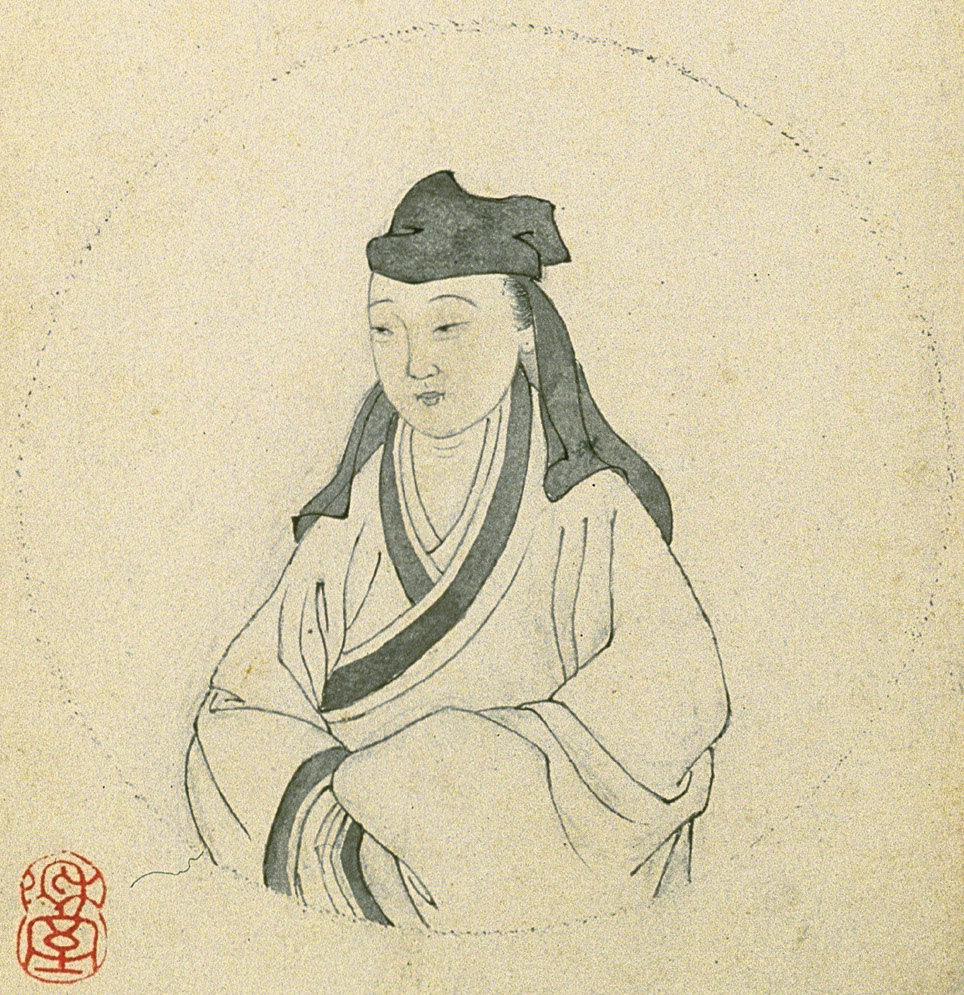
- 1847 portrait of Liu Rushi, ink on paper, by Lu Ji and Cheng Tinglu
- Born: Yang Yunjuan; 1618; Jiaxing, Zhejiang
- Died: 1664 (aged 45–46)
- Resting place: Mount Yu, Changshu, Jiangsu
- Other names: Liu Shi (柳是), Liu Yin (柳隱), Yang Yunjuan (楊雲娟), Yang Yinglian (楊影憐), Yang Ai (楊愛), Hedong Jun (河東君), Miwu Jun (蘼蕪君), Wowenshi Zhuren (我聞室主人), Wowen Jushi (我聞居室)
- Occupations: courtesan, poet, writer
- Known for: Poetry, Patriotic spirit

Liu Rushi (Chinese: 柳如是; pinyin: Liú Rúshì; Wade–Giles: Liu Ju-shih; 1618–1664), also known as Yang Ai (楊愛), Liu Shi (柳是), Liu Yin (柳隱),Yang Yinlian (楊影憐) and Hedong Jun (河東君), was a Chinese courtesan, poet and writer in the late Ming dynasty and early Qing dynasty.

She is one of the "Eight Beauties of Qinhuai" described by late Qing official Zhang Jingqi. In addition to her creative works (many of which have survived) and independent spirit, she has been revered in later times for her unwavering love for her husband and for her country (the Ming) during the Ming–Qing transition. Historian Chen Yinke, who spent decades researching and writing about her, characterizes Liu Rushi as "a heroine, a belle, a wordsmith, and a patriot" (女俠名姝 文宗國士).

== Early life ==
Liu Rushi was born in 1618. Her original surname was Yang and she was from Jiaxing, Zhejiang. Due to her poor family, she was sold to Guijia Yuan (归家院) who trained courtesans since she was a child. She was unfortunate in her childhood and her life experience is unknown. When Liu Rushi was about four or five years old, she began to receive training in art and literature. She worked as a courtesan apprentice and maid in Guijia Yuan. She was very smart since she was a child, the boss of Guijia Yuan is Xu Fo (徐佛), a former famous courtesan. Xu Fo is also Liu Rushi's teacher. Under her influence, Liu Rushi was able to read extensively, write poetry and paint flowers. When Liu Rushi was about 13 years old, she was sold into the home of Zhou Daodeng, the former prime minister of Chongzhen, and married to Zhou Daodeng, who was over sixty years old, as his concubine. The relationship between Liu Rushi and Zhou Daodeng is more like that of a granddaughter and a grandfather, Zhou Daodeng often held her on his lap and taught her poetry and songs, which made the other wives and concubines very jealous. After Zhou Daodeng's death, fourteen-year-old Liu Rushi was kicked out of the Zhou family. Liu Rushi, who left the Zhou family, chose to become a courtesan.

In 1632, Liu Rushi came to Songjiang and gave herself the name Yinglian (影怜), which stands for self-pity in troubled times. In Songjiang, she communicated with Fushe, Jishe, and Donglin Party members. She often wore Confucian attire and men's clothing to gather with literati, talk about the general situation of the country, and sang many poems. When making friends with men, she liked to call herself "brother". She also often travels by boat between Jiangsu, Zhejiang and Jinling. Liu Rushi performed at the 75th birthday party of calligrapher and painter Chen Jiru. She performed singing and dancing, and the song she sang was the poem "Poetry·Xiaoya·Tianbao" in which the officials of the Zhou Dynasty prayed for the Emperor of Zhou. Liu Rushi's sweet singing voice made the birthday star feel relaxed and happy, and also made the guests present shine.

In 1632, when Liu Rushi met the poet Song Zhengyu, he was similar in age to her and liked each other. This was Liu Rushi's first lover in Songjiang. Song Zhengyu was born into a wealthy family, and their love was opposed by Song Zhengyu's mother. Liu Rushi cut off the strings of the guqin with a knife in front of Song Zhengyu and broke up with Song Zhengyu. Liu Rushi later fell in love with Chen Zilong, and both of them were very affectionate. They lived in Songjiang Nanlou for a long time, wrote poems, and discussed poems. Chen Zilong's wife, Zhang, led people to make trouble in the south building. Due to opposition from Chen Zilong's family, the two were forced to break up. Liu Rushi was unwilling to be humiliated and left sadly and resolutely. Despite this, Chen Zilong still has feelings for Liu Rushi. Chen Zilong was unfortunately defeated and died in the anti-Qing uprising. Liu Rushi discussed poetry with male literati and socialized with men, but some only stayed in poetry exchanges, and some men were just friends. Wang Ruqian, a wealthy businessman and literati, was Liu Rushi's good friend and he appreciated Liu Rushi's talent. The talented courtesan and poet Wang Wei was also Wang Ruqian's good friend. She was friends with fellow courtesan Chen Yuanyuan. Liu Rushi is also good friends with the courtesans Dong Xiaowan, Gu Hengbo, Li Xiangzhen and Li Xiangjun. She is also good friends with the boudoir woman and painter Huang Yuanjie.

Liu Rushi gave herself the name Rushi (如是), taken from a line in "Hexinlang · Shenyiwushuaiyi" (贺新郎·国脉微如缕) written by poet Xin Qiji, "I see how charming the green mountains are, and I expected that the green mountains should see the same in me". Liu Rushi's patriotic spirit is very strong, and she also regards Liang Hongyu, a patriotic female general of the Song Dynasty who was a courtesan, as her idol.

== Marriage to Qian Qianyi ==
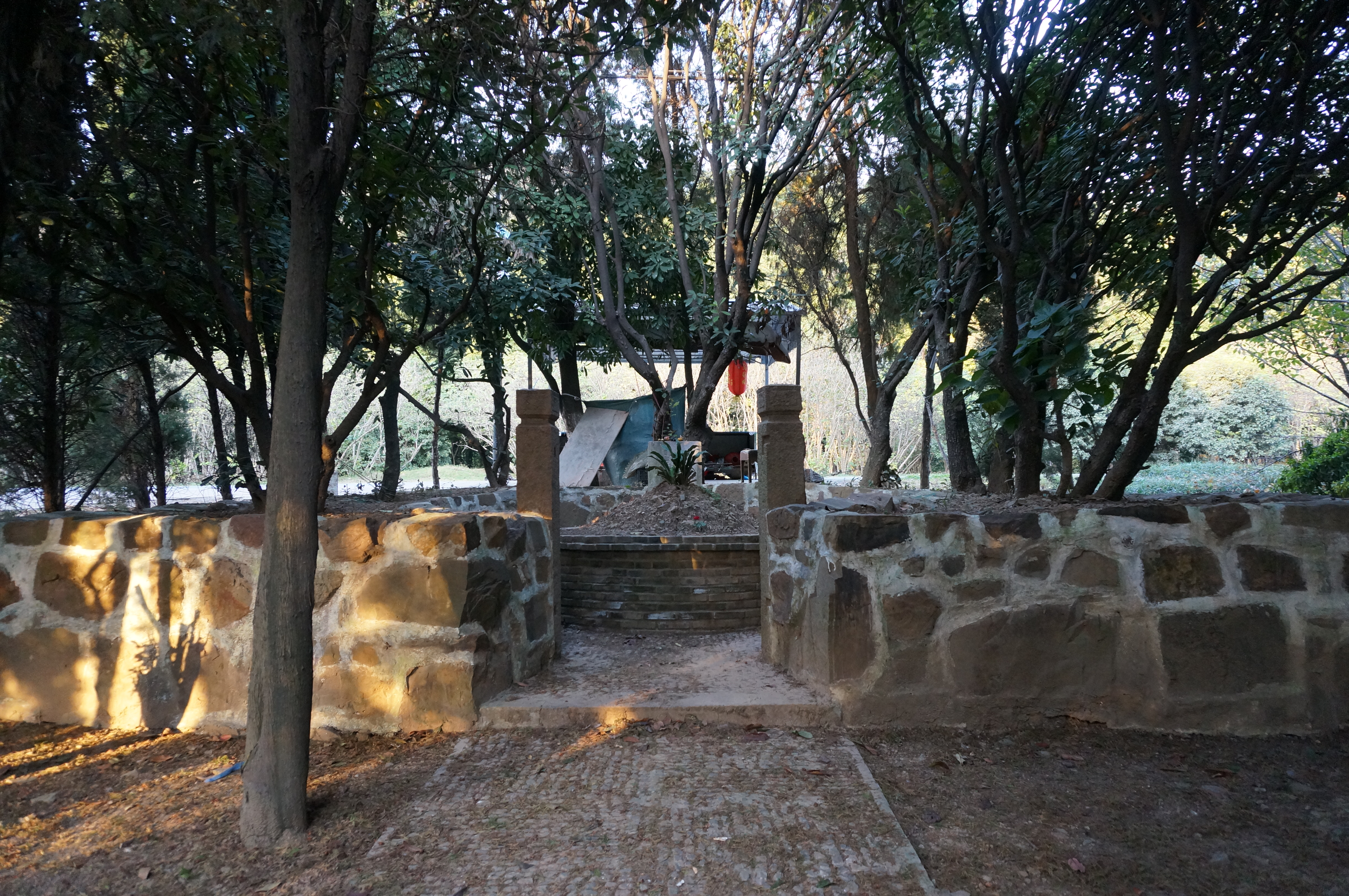
Tomb of Liu Rushi, on Mount Yu, Changshu

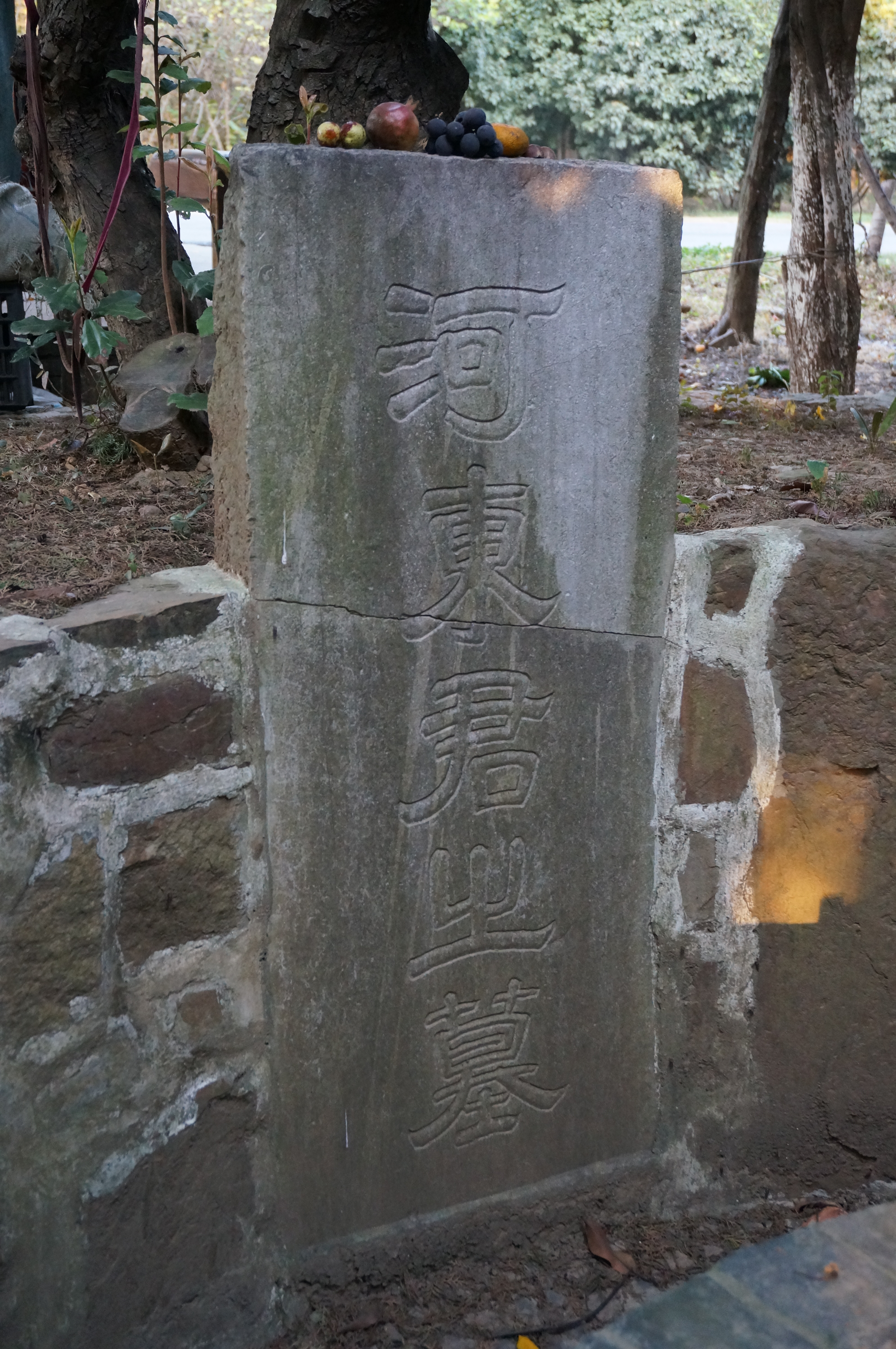
Tombstone

In 1640 Liu embarked on a campaign to marry the respected scholar Qian Qianyi. Dressed in men's clothing, she accosted Qian and requested his opinion on one of her poems. Qian apparently believed her to be a man, but later in the year he had established her at a specially built hermitage in the grounds of his Suzhou estate, called the "According to Sutra Studio". They married in 1641 on a river cruise; Qian bestowed upon his bride the new name of Hedong. Although he married her as a concubine, Qian treated Liu as his principal wife, and they were married in a formal wedding ceremony. Her affinity for crossdressing persisted after they were married; she regularly wore men's clothing in public and on occasion made calls on her husband's behalf dressed in his Confucian robes, earning her an alternative interpretation of her name "Rushi", which means a Confucian scholar or Rushi (儒士).

After the collapse of the Ming dynasty in 1644, Liu tried to persuade her husband to commit suicide and martyr himself to the fallen Ming. Qian refused, instead choosing to assist the growing anti-Qing resistance movement. In 1648, the couple had a daughter together.

The last years of her life were difficult for Liu. In 1663, she entered the Buddhist laity, partly as a response to the destruction of her husband's substantial personal library, the Crimson Cloud-Storied Hall. After Qian's death in 1664, his creditors and enemies attempted to extort money from Liu; their machinations eventually drove her to hang herself.

== List of paintings ==
Landscapes with Figures, album leaves, ink and color on paper. Freer Gallery of Art, Washington, D.C.

Misty Willows at the Moon Dike, 1643, handscroll, ink and color on paper. Palace Museum, Beijing.

Other paintings by Liu Rushi include "Mountain Village in Smoke and Rain(煙雨山村)", "Early Spring Garden Drama(早春園戲)", "Fragrance Far and Bright(香遠益清)" etc.

== Poetry ==
During her life Liu Rushi was a prolific poet, publishing four collections of her work before the age of 22. Her calligraphy was noted for its bold, masculine strokes, using the "wild-grass script" style. Her solo anthologies included Songs from the Mandarin Duck Chamber and Poems Drafted by a Lake, and her poetry was published alongside her husband's in a number of his works.

Other collections of poems by Liu Rushi include, "Grass on the Lake (湖上草)", "Wuyin Grass (戊寅草)", "Liu Rushi's Poems (柳如是詩)", "Hongdou Village Miscellanies (紅豆村莊雜錄)", "Plum Blossom Collection (梅花集句)", "Dongshan Sing Collection (東山酬唱集)", "Collection of Poems from Hedong (河東詩文集)", etc. In addition to poetry collections, calligraphy and painting works, Liu Rushi also wrote 31 Chidu (尺牘).

== Commemorate ==
The Qing dynasty magistrate Chen Wenshu (陳文述) helped preserve her tomb and once helped rebuild it. To this day, Liu Rushi's tomb still exists.

== See also ==
- Classical Chinese poetry
- Tales of Ming Courtesans, a historical novel by Alice Poon in which Liu Rushi is one of the three protagonists, the other two being Chen Yuanyuan and Li Xiangjun.
