= Geji =

Ancient China courtesan

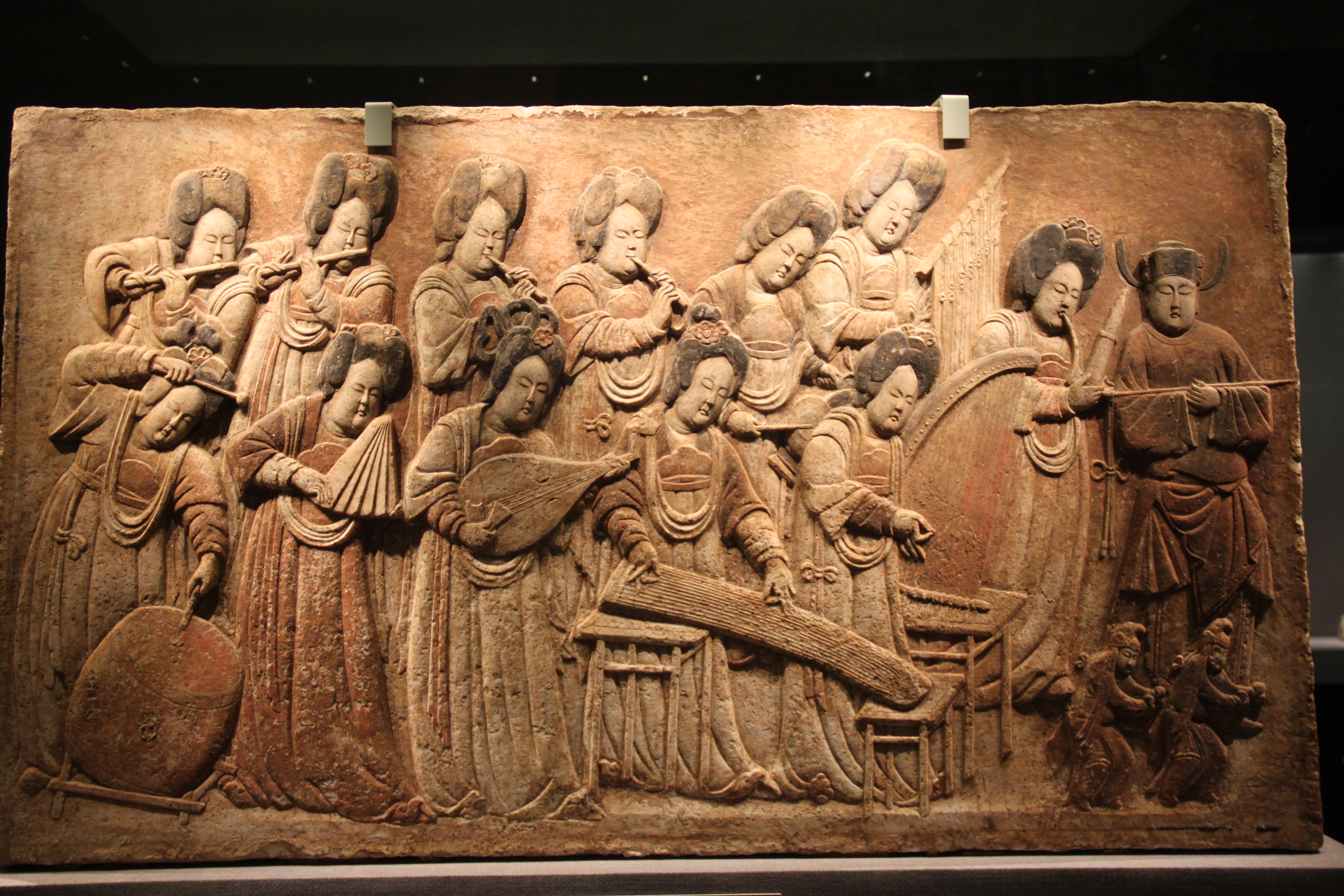
Gejis of the Five Dynasties

Geji (Chinese: 歌妓、歌伎、歌姬; lit. 'singer-performer') were female Chinese performing artists and courtesans who trained in singing and dancing in ancient China.

During the Warring States Period, a legendary figure named Han'e is believed to be the first example of a geji. Recorded in the Taoist manuscript the Liezi, Han'e is said to have traveled and made her living by singing. A popular idiom used to praise one's singing in Chinese was derived from the legend of Han'e.

Like other entertainers in ancient China, geji had low social standing. Some geji contributed to the development of dance, poetry, painting and other arts and literature throughout China's history. During the Song and Tang Dynasty, geji would perform poems as songs, which helped the spread of ancient Chinese poems.

Geji were primarily pursued for their artistic talents in singing, dancing, and literary arts; they also sometimes provided sexual services to their clients. In ancient China, music and sexual performance were intertwined; consequently, the poetry, rather than music, of courtesans such as geji were often held up as an example of their high-culture.

During the Ming Dynasty, the talents of courtesans such as geji were widely cultivated to distinguish them more heavily from common prostitutes. This development coincided with a general increase in wealth during the Ming Dynasty, which allowed even men of low social standing to engage with common prostitutes, prompting men of high-status to cultivate and seek out courtesans for cultural capital.

The relationships between literati (scholar-official of imperial China) and the geji often became heavily romanticized during the late Ming Dynasty, and even married women associated openly with geji, inviting them to parties. Famously, the poet Xu Yuan was known to keep the company of famous geji, such as Xue Susu. Following the collapse of the Ming Dynasty, the Qing Dynasty banned courtesans such as geji from performing at official functions.

== See also ==
- Hetaira in Ancient Greece
- Geisha and Oiran in Japan
- Kisaeng in Korea
- Sing-song girls
- Tawaif, similar profession during colonial India
