= List of Chinese women writers =

The following is a list of Chinese women writers.

== B ==
- Consort Ban (c.48–c.6 BCE) scholar and poet
- Ban Zhao (45–c. 116) historian, polymath, author of Lessons for Women, one of the Four Books for Women
- Bao Junhui (fl. late 8th Century) poet
- Bao Linghui (fl. c.464) poet
- Anni Baobei (born 1974) novelist
- Bing Xin (1900–1999) fiction and children's writer
- Bu Feiyan (born 1981) novelist

== C ==
- Cai Yan (c.178–after 206) poet
- Cai Wan (1695–1755) poet
- Cao Exiu (13th Century) Zaju actress and poet
- Cao Miaoqing (14th Century) poet, calligrapher, musician
- Chai Jingyi (17th Century) head of the Banana Garden Poets
- Chang Ch'ung-ho (1914–2015) poet
- Eileen Chang (1920–1995) novelist, essayist and screenwriter
- Chen Jingrong (1917–1989) poet
- Chen Danyan (born 1958) biographer
- Chen Duansheng (1751–1796) Tanci author
- Chen Xiaocui (1902–1967), poet, novelist, painter
- Chen Xiefen (1883–1923) magazine editor
- Chen Xuezhao (1906–1991) writer and commentator
- Chen Yuanyuan (17th Century) Geji
- Cheng Changwen (Tang Dynasty) poet and calligrapher
- Cheng Huiying (fl. 1859–1899), author of Phoenixes Flying Together
- Angelica Cheung (born 1966) fashion writer

== D ==
- Dai Houying (1938–1996) novelist
- Ding Ling (1904–1986) fiction writer
- Dong Xiaowan (1624–1651) Geji poet
- Duan Shuqing (c.1510–c.1600) poet

== F ==
- Fang Fang (born 1955) poet and novelist
- Fang Weiyi (1585–1668) poet and historian of women writers
- Feng Yuanjun (1900–1974) scholar
- Fu Shanxiang (1833–1864) scholar
- Fu Tianlin (born 1946) poet

== G ==
- Gao Yu (born 1944) journalist
- Gu Hengbo (1619–1664) Gējì poet
- Gu Taiqing (1799–c.1877) poet
- Guan Daosheng (1262–1319) poet
- Guo Ai (died 1428) consort and poet

== H ==
- Han Lanying (died 493) scholar and writer
- Hao Jingfang (born 1984) novelist
- He Shuangqing (1715-c.1737) lyric poet
- Hong Ying (born 1962) novelist and poet
- Ganggang Hu Guidice (born 1984) writer and artist
- Hü King Eng (1865–1929) physician
- Hu Lanqi (1901–1994) writer and military leader
- Huang Chonggu (885-924) administrator, poet
- Huang E (1498–1569) poet
- Madame Huarui (c.940–976) poet

== J ==
- Jiang Biwei (1899–1978) memoirist
- Jiang Hui (1839-after 1880) astronomer
- Jin Yi (1770–1794) poet

== K ==
- Ke Yan (1929–2011) playwright, novelist and poet
- Kin Yamei (1864–1935) physician

== L ==
- Li Pingxiang (late 19th-early 20th Century) Gējì poet
- Li Qingzhao (1084–c.1151) writer and poet
- Li Ye (died 784) poet
- Liang Desheng (1771–1847) poet and Tanci author
- Lin Huiyin (1904–1955) architectural historian
- Lin Zongsu (1878–1944) women's rights essayist
- Ling Shuhua (1900–1990) modernist writer and painter
- Lin Xue (Ming Dynasty) landscape painter, poet, calligrapher
- Lin Yining (1655-c.1730) one of the original Banana Garden Poets
- Liu Qingyun (c.1841-c.1900) playwright
- Liu Rushi (1618–1664) singer, poet and writer
- Liu Ying (born 1974) novelist
- Lü Bicheng (1883–1943) poet and commentator
- Luo Luo (born 1982) novelist
- Lüqiu Luwei (born 1969) journalist

== M ==
- Ma Shouzhen (c.1548–1604) Geji poet and painter, also known as Ma Xianglan
- Mian Mian (born 1970) fiction writer
- Duchess Mu of Xu (fl. 7th Century BCE) poet

== N ==
- Niu Yingzhen (8th Century) poet

== P ==
- Lynn Pan (1945–2024) travel writer

== Q ==
- Qiu Jin (1875–1907) poet, essayist and political writer

== R ==
- Rao Xueman (born 1972) fiction writer, essayist and blogger
- Ru Zhijuan (1925–1998) fiction writer

== S ==
- Shangguan Wan'er (c.664–710) poet and writer
- Shen Qing (living) fashion writer
- Shen Rong (1936–2024) fiction writer and essayist
- Shen Shanbao (1808–1862) poet and writer
- Shu Ting (born 1952) poet
- Song Mingqiong (died 1802) poet
- Song Ruolun (fl. 8th Century) one of the five Song Sisters
- Song Ruoshen (died 820) primary author of Analects for Women, one of the Four Books for Women
- Song Ruoxian (772-835) secretary and record keeper for Emperor Jingzong
- Song Ruoxun (fl. 8th Century) one of the five Song Sisters
- Song Ruozhao (761-828) poet, biographer, annotated her sister Ruoshen's Analects for Women
- Su Hui (4th Century) poet
- Su Qing (1914–1982) essayist
- Su Xiaoxiao (c.479 – c.501) poet
- Su Xuelin (1897–1999) author and scholar

== T ==
- Tian Yuan (born 1985) singer-songwriter and novelist
- Tie Ning (born 1957) novelist and short story writer

== W ==
- Wang Anyi (born 1954) fiction writer
- Wang Qinghui (1264–1288) poet
- Wang Wei (1597–1647) poet
- Wang Xufeng (born 1955) writer on tea and novelist
- Wang Yun (1749–1819) poet and playwright
- Yun Wang (born 1964) poet and cosmologist
- Woeser (born 1966) blogger, poet and essayist
- Wu Chuntao (born 1963) social writer
- Wu Zao (1799–1862) poet
- Wu Zetian (624–705) empress-regnant, poet and calligrapher
- Madame Wu (13th Century) cookbook writer

== X ==
- Xi Xi (1937–2022) novelist and poet
- Xia Jia (born 1984) science fiction and fantasy writer
- Xiao Hong (1911–1942) fiction writer and essayist
- Xie Bingying (1906–2000) autobiographer
- Xie Daoyun (4th Century) poet and scholar
- Xin Fengxia (1927–1998) actress, author, artist
- Xinran (born 1958) non-fiction writer
- Empress Xu (1362–1407) author of Domestic Lessons, one of the Four Books for Women
- Xu Hui (627–650) poet
- Xu Kun (born 1965) postmodern fiction writer
- Xu Yuan (c.1560–1620) poet
- Xu Zihua (1873–1935) poet
- Xue Susu (c.1564–c.1650) poet
- Xue Tao (768–831) poet

== Y ==
- Yang Erche Namu (born 1966) social writer
- Yang Gang (1905–1957) journalist, novelist and translator
- Yang Hongying (born 1962) children's fiction writer
- Yang Jiang (1911–2016) playwright, author and translator
- Ting-Xing Ye (born 1952) author of young adult novels
- Ye Yingchun (born 1970) commentator
- Chia-ying Yeh (1924–2024) poet and scholar
- Lizzie Yu Der Ling (1885–1944), writer of several memoirs
- Nellie Yu Roung Ling (1889–1973), author of a memoir and a novella
- Yu Xuanji (c.840–c.868) poet
- Yun Zhu (1771–1833) poet, painter, moralist

== Z ==
- Zeng Baosun (1893–1978) historian
- Zhai Yongming (born 1955) poet
- Zhang Haidi (born 1955) writer and translator
- Zhang Huaicun (born 1972) novelist, poet and children's writer
- Zhang Jie (1937–2022) fiction writer
- Zhang Kangkang (born 1950) fiction writer
- Lijia Zhang (born 1964) commentator and public speaker
- Zhang Ling (born 1957) fiction writer
- Zhang Xinxin (born 1953) biographer and fiction writer
- Zhang Yaotiao (fl. 9th Century) poet
- Zhang Yueran (born 1982) fiction writer
- Empress Zhangsun (601–636) essayist
- Zhao Luanluan (fl. mid–14th Century) poet
- Zhao Luorui (1912–1998) poet and translator
- Zheng Min (1920–2022) scholar and poet
- Zheng Yunduan (c.1327–1356) poet
- Zheng Xiaoqiong (living, b. 1980) poet and writer
- Yilin Zhong (living) fiction writer and poet
- Zhou Weihui (born 1973) novelist
- Zhu Lin (born 1949) novelist
- Zhu Shuzhen (c.1135–1180) poet
- Zhuo Wenjun (fl. 2nd Century BCE) poet
- Zong Pu (born 1928) writer and scholar
- Zuo Fen (c.255–300) poet

== See also ==
- List of Chinese writers
- List of women writers
- List of Chinese-language poets
