= Liu Caichun =

Chinese Tang Dynasty female artist and poet

- 刘采春
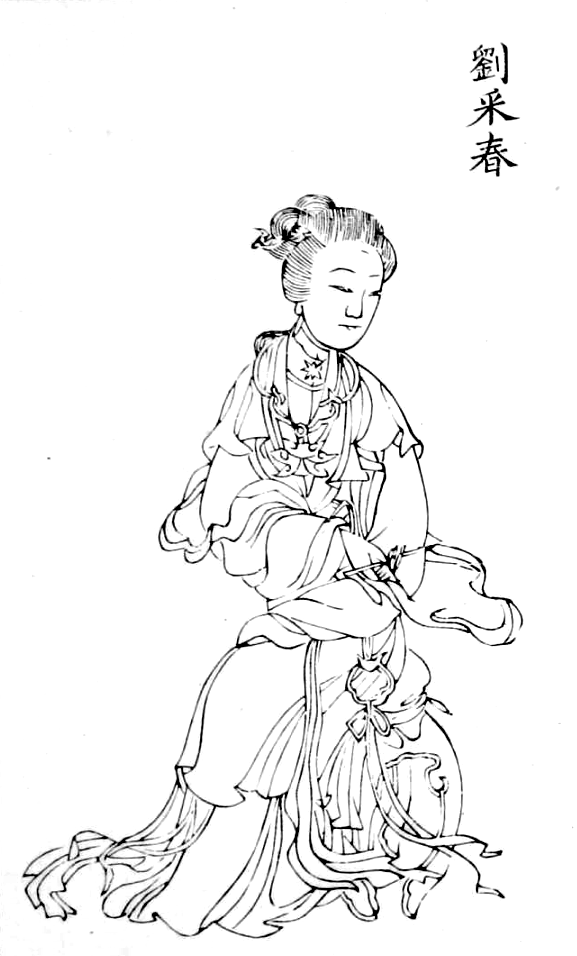
- Liu Caichun, from the 18th century work Hundred Poems of Beautiful Women. Woodblock print of drawing by Wang Hui
- Born: Unknown
- Died: Unknown
- Occupations: Courtesan, Poet, Actor
- Known for: The Song of Luogen

Liu Caichun (simplified Chinese: 刘采春; traditional Chinese: 劉采春; pinyin: Liú Cǎichūn) was a courtesan, actress, and poet in the Tang Dynasty. Along with Xue Tao, Yu Xuanji and Li Ye she became known as one of the most famous female poets of the Tang Dynasty. Together they are referred to as "the four great female poets of the Tang Dynasty".

== Biography ==
Liu Caichun is believed to have come from a poor family. Though her exact origin is unknown, it has been suggested that she was from Huaidian, Zhejiang, or Yangzhou. She formed a traveling drama troupe together with her husband, Zhou Jicong, that was known to have performed adjutant plays (參軍). Described as an excellent singer, her singing of Watching for my Husband is reported to have brought audiences to tears. Liu Caichun had a daughter with Zhou Jicong named Zhou Dehua(周德华), who also became a successful courtesan. During Yuan Zhen's time as governor of Yuezhou and East Zhejiang, Liu Caichun arrived in Yuezhou with her troupe, where Yuan Zhen is said to have appreciated her work. During this time, Liu Caichun became the target of the affections of Yuan Zhen, who abandoned his pursuit of Xue Tao after falling for Liu Caichun. Yuan Zhen is known to have composed a poem dedicated to Liu Caichun in which he describes her makeup and her singing. She maintained contact with Yuan Zhen for seven years before their relationship ended.There is no record of Liu Caichun's death in the historical record, so it is unknown what happened to her later in life.

== Personal poetry ==
Although several poems are attributed to Liu Caichun and she is considered among "the four great female poets of the Tang Dynasty", it is unclear if any of the poems attributed to her were actually written by her as Fan Shu records that they were composed by contemporary literati. Although many works attributed to her have been lost, the collection of six poems titled The Song of Luogen has been preserved.
