= Julian Bell =

British poet (1908-1937)

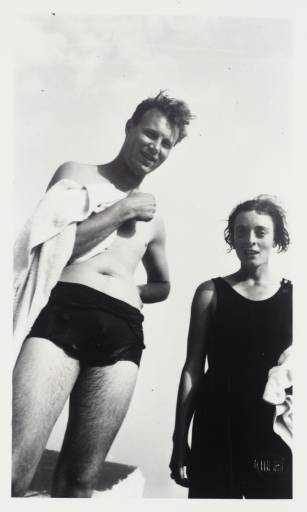
- Julian Bell and Elizabeth Watson, 1930
- Born: Julian Heward Bell; 4 February 1908; St Pancras, London, England
- Died: 18 July 1937 (aged 29); Brunete, Second Spanish Republic
- Cause of death: Killed in action (bomb fragments)
- Education: King's College, Cambridge
- Occupation: Poet
- Partners: Anthony Blunt
- Relatives: Clive Bell (father); Vanessa Bell (mother); Virginia Woolf (aunt)
- Writing career
- Language: English

Julian Heward Bell (4 February 1908 – 18 July 1937) was an English poet, and the son of Clive and Vanessa Bell (who was the elder sister of Virginia Woolf). The writer Quentin Bell was his younger brother and the writer and painter Angelica Garnett was his half-sister.

== Background ==
Julian Heward Bell was born in St Pancras, London, and was brought up at Charleston, Sussex. He was educated at Leighton Park School and King's College, Cambridge, where he joined the Cambridge Apostles. He was a friend of some of the Cambridge Five, including Anthony Blunt, to whom he lost his virginity. (In the BBC dramatisation Cambridge Spies he appears as Blunt's lover and Guy Burgess's unrequited love interest). After graduating he worked towards a college fellowship, without success.

In 1935 he went to China, to a position teaching English at Wuhan University. He wrote letters describing his relationship with a married lover, K. - Ling Shuhua, the wife of Professor Chen Yuan (better known by his pen-name, Chen Xiying). The identity of 'K' became a sensitive issue when the Chinese-British novelist Hong Ying published a fictionalised account, K: The Art of Love in 1999. After a 2002 ruling by a Chinese court, that the book was 'defamation of the dead', the author rewrote the book, which was published in 2003 under the title The English Lover.

Bell was initially a pacifist and edited an anthology of memoirs of conscientious objectors from the First World War, We Did Not Fight.

In 1937, Bell became increasingly supportive of the socialist and anti-fascist movements and decided to enlist in the Spanish Civil War. His parents and his aunt Virginia tried to dissuade him; eventually, they persuaded Julian to get a job as an ambulance driver on the Republican side, rather than a soldier. His motive for going to Spain was general sympathy for the cause of the Spanish Republic, plus "the usefulness of war experience in the future and the prestige one would gain in literature and – even more – Left politics". After just a month in Spain he found himself in the thick of the action, driving an ambulance for the British Medical Unit attached to the International Brigades at the Battle of Brunete. On 15 July, he was hit by bomb fragments on a stretch of road just outside Villanueva de la Cañada, sustaining a massive lung wound, and later died in a military hospital at El Escorial. He was 29.

== Works ==
- Winter Movement (1930) poems
- We Did Not Fight: 1914–18 Experiences of War Resisters (1935) editor
- Work for the Winter (1936) poems
- Essays, Poems and Letters (1938) edited by Quentin Bell
