= K: The Art of Love =

1999 novel by Hong Ying

- Author: Hong Ying
- Language: English
- Publication date: 1999

K: The Art of Love is a 1999 novel by Hong Ying which was published in 2001 in Taiwan. It is about a fictionalised account between Julian Bell and his married Chinese lover K. The book was banned in China after the daughter of Ling Shuhua sued the author for using her mother's name as K. After a 2002 ruling by a Chinese court, the book was deemed a "defamation of the dead". The author rewrote the book, which was published in 2003 under the title The English Lover.

== Plot ==
Vanessa Bell's son, ambulance driver Julian Bell, was killed in the Spanish Civil War and his body was taken to China. This shocked his married lover Lin Chang who tried to commit suicide multiple times. Their love affair began when Julian was a colleague of Lin's husband, who was a scholar. Julian referred to Lin (his eleventh lover) as "K" which is the eleventh letter of the alphabet. However, the love affair was threatened by betrayal and tragedy.
