= Han (Chinese surname) =

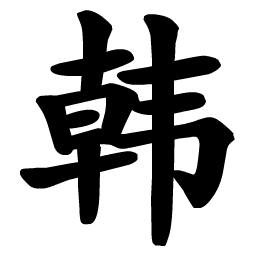
- Simplified Chinese: 韩
- Traditional Chinese: 韓
Transcriptions
Standard Mandarin
- Hanyu Pinyin: Hán
- Wade–Giles: Han^{2}
Yue: Cantonese
- Yale Romanization: Hon^{4}
Southern Min
- Hokkien POJ: Hân

Hán
- Chinese: 寒
Transcriptions
Standard Mandarin
- Hanyu Pinyin: Hán
- Wade–Giles: Han^{2}
Yue: Cantonese
- Yale Romanization: Hon^{4}

Hàn
- Simplified Chinese: 汉
- Traditional Chinese: 漢
Transcriptions
Standard Mandarin
- Hanyu Pinyin: Hàn
- Wade–Giles: Han^{4}
Yue: Cantonese
- Yale Romanization: Hon^{3}

Han (simplified Chinese: 韩; traditional Chinese: 韓; pinyin: Hán) is a common Chinese surname. The spelling "Han" is based on China's pinyin system and so used throughout mainland China. Spelling can vary from 'Hon' in Cantonese-speaking areas to 'Hang' in Hainan. It is the 15th name on the Hundred Family Surnames poem. In 2003, Han (韩) is ranked 25th in China in terms of the number of bearers at around 8 million persons. In 2019 it was the 28th most common surname in mainland China.

Less common Chinese surnames romanized as Han include: 寒 (Hán) and 汉/漢 (Hàn).

== Four Chinese origins of '韩' ==
=== From the '姬' surname ===
'姬' (Jì) is an ancient Chinese surname. It is an alternate surname of the Yellow Emperor (Gongsun Xuanyuan) and the Zhou ruling family. A descendant of King Wu of Zhou, Wan, was given land in Hanyuan. Wan's descendants created the State of Han during the Warring States period. When the state was conquered by Qin in 230 BC, members of the ruling family adopted Han '韩' as their surname.

=== From the transcription of non-Han names ===
Non-Han ethnic groups tend to adopt Chinese surnames through the process known as sinicization. During the reforms of Emperor Xiao Wen of Northern Wei, the Xianbei surname 'Dahan', 大汗 (dà hàn) in Chinese, was changed to Han '韩' because the two names sound similar after 'Da' or '大' is dropped. Manchu clan names Hacihuri (Chinese: 哈思呼哩; pinyin: Hāsīhūlī), Hangiya (Chinese: 韩佳; pinyin: Hánjiā), Hanja (Chinese: 罕扎; pinyin: Hànzhā), Hanyan (Chinese: 翰颜; pinyin: Hányán), and Gilate (Chinese: 吉喇特; pinyin: Jílǎtè) were changed to Han '韩'.

=== From the given name ===
The mythical Yellow Emperor had a son Chang Yi, who had a son with the given name Han Liu. Those who claimed to be Han Liu's descendants adopted Han as their surname.

=== By imperial appointment ===
The Salar Muslims voluntarily joined the Ming dynasty. The Salar clan leaders each capitulated to the Ming dynasty around 1370. The chief of the four upper clans around this time was Han Pao-yuan and Ming granted him office of centurion, it was at this time the people of his four clans took Han as their surname. The other chief Han Shan-pa of the four lower Salar clans got the same office from Ming, and his clans were the ones who took Ma as their surname.

Ma and Han are the two most widespread names among the salar. Ma is a Salar surname for the same reason it is a common Hui surname, Ma substitutes for Muhammad. The upper four clans of the Salar assumed the surname Han and lived west of Xunhua. One of these Salar surnamed Han was Han Yimu, a Salar officer who served under General Ma Bufang. He fought in the Kuomintang Islamic Insurgency in China (1950–1958), leading Salars in a revolt in 1952 and 1958. Han Youwen was another Salar General, who served in the Communist People's Liberation Army.

== Notable people with the surname 韩/韓 ==
=== Modern world ===
- Han Decai (韩德彩), Chinese flying ace
- Han Dong (actor) (韩栋, born 1980), Chinese actor
- Han Dong (韩东), Chinese member of the South Korean girl group Dreamcatcher
- Han Dongfang (韩东方), human rights activist
- Han Fuju (韓復榘), Kuomintang general
- Han Geng (韩庚), singer and actor
- Han Hong (singer) (韩红, born 1971), Chinese singer and songwriter
- Han Hui Hui (韩慧慧, born 1992), Malaysian-born Singaporean activist
- Jiawei Han (born 1949), Chinese-American computer scientist
- Han Kuo-Huang (born 1936), Chinese-born American ethnomusicologist
- Han Kuo-yu (韓國瑜), President of the Legislative Yuan of the Republic of China, former mayor of Kaohsiung,
- Han Lao Da (韩劳达), Singaporean playwright
- Han Lei (韓磊, born 1968), Chinese singer and songwriter
- Han Meilin (韩美林), artist
- Han Sai Por (韩少芙), Singaporean sculptor
- Han Shaogong (韩少功), novelist
- Han Xiaopeng (韩晓鹏), Chinese freestyle skier
- Han Xianchu (韩先楚/韓先楚), general in the People's Liberation Army
- Han Xinyun (韩馨蕴), Chinese tennis player
- Han Xuan (footballer, born 1991), Chinese footballer
- Han Xuan (footballer, born 1995), Chinese footballer
- Han Youwen (韩有文/韓有文), general in the National Revolutionary Army
- Han Zhen (韩振), Chinese member of the South Korean boy group TWS
- Han Zheng (韩正, born 1954), mayor of Shanghai
- Hon Sui Sen (韩瑞生, 1916–1983), Singaporean politician
- Linda May Han Oh (born 1984), Australian jazz bassist

=== Pre-modern world ===
- Han Dang (韓當), general of the Three Kingdoms period
- Han Fei (韓非), philosopher of the Warring States period
- Han Fu (warlord) (韓馥), warlord of the Eastern Han dynasty
- Han Gan (韓幹), painter of the Tang dynasty
- Han Guang (韓廣), ruler of the Kingdom of Liaodong
- Han Hong (general) (韓弘), general and statesman of the Tang dynasty
- Han Hao (韓浩), general of the Eastern Han dynasty
- Han Lanying (韓蘭英), scholar and writer of the Southern Qi and Liu Song dynasties
- Han Shantong (韓山童), rebel leader of the Yuan dynasty
- Han Shizhong (韓世忠), general of the Southern Song dynasty
- Han Sui (韓遂), general and warlord of the Eastern Han dynasty
- Han Tuozhou (韓侂胄), statesman of the Southern Song dynasty
- Han Xiangzi (韓湘子), one of the Eight Immortals
- Han Ximeng (韓希孟), silk embroiderer of the Ming dynasty
- Han Xin (韓信), general of the Western Han dynasty
- Xin of Han (韓王信) (died c. 196 BC), a vassal ruler under Emperor Gaozu of Han
- Han Xuan (fl. 200s–210), Chinese government official and warlord
- Han Yu (韓愈), poet and philosopher of the Tang dynasty
- Han Zhangluan (died before 607), Chinese governor of the Northern Qi dynasty
- Concubine Han, a Korean concubine of the Chinese Ming dynasty Hongwu emperor

== See also ==
- Change of Xianbei names to Han names
- List of common Chinese surnames
