= Jin Yi =

Jin Yi is the name of:

- Jin Yi (金禕) (died 218), son of Han dynasty warlord Jin Xuan, participated in a rebellion in 218
- Jin Yi (poet) (1770–1794), Qing dynasty poet
- Jin Shaoshan (1889–1948), Chinese Peking opera actor, born Jin Yi
