= Li Ye =

Li Ye (Wade–Giles: Li Yeh) may refer to:

- Li Ye (Juyou) (李業), style name Juyou (巨游), Eastern Han dynasty official and scholar
- Li Ye (Prince of Xue) (died 734), born Li Longye, son of Emperor Ruizong of Tang
- Li Ye (poet) (died 784), poet
- Emperor Zhaozong of Tang (867–904), name Li Ye (李曄), the 19th emperor of the Tang dynasty
- Li Ye (Five Dynasties) (李業), the younger brother of Empress Li of Later Han.
- Li Ye (mathematician) (李冶; 1192–1279), mathematician and scholar, birth name Li Zhi (李治)
- Li Ye (speed skater) (李野; born 1983), Chinese short track speed skater

== See also ==
- Ye Li (born 1981), Chinese women's basketball player
