= He Shuangqing =

Chinese poet

He Shuangqing 賀雙卿
- Born: 1715; Danyang, Jiangsu, China
- Died: c. 1737; Jintan, Jiangsu, China
- Occupations: Poet, Farmwife

He Shuangqing (Chinese: 賀雙卿) (1715 – c. 1737) was a Chinese poet who lived during the Qing dynasty. She is best known for her work in the lyric genre, but also composed poems in regulated verse. Her song lyrics are frequently included in anthologies of women's poetry from the late imperial period and she has been named as one of the three major female lyric poets of the Qing dynasty.

He Shuangqing's biography and poetry were made known in the Random Records of West-Green (Chinese: 西青散記; pinyin: Xi qing san ji), a literary and travel diary by the scholar Shi Zhenlin (1693 – c. 1779) first published in 1738. As a peasant woman living in an illiterate household, He Shuangqing published no works under her own name. Shi Zhenlin's romantic representation of He Shuangqing has led to uncertainty regarding the authorship of the poetry attributed to her and her identity as a historical person as opposed to a literary fabrication.

== Biography ==
He Shuangqing was born into a peasant family in Danyang county, Jiangsu in 1715. As a girl, she learned to write by listening in on lessons given by her uncle, the village tutor, and exchanging her embroidery for poetry books. At the age of seventeen, He Shuangqing was married to a farmer who lived near Xiaoshan, in Jintan county. Her husband, surnamed Zhou, was illiterate and more than a decade her senior.

In the years following her marriage, He Shuangqing suffered from malaria and struggled under the cruel demands of her husband and mother-in-law as she carried out household duties and worked the family farm. In 1733, she became acquainted with the visiting scholar Shi Zhenlin and began to exchange poetry and letters with his literary circle, who admired her beauty, virtue, and literary talent. She wrote her own poetry on leaves, using pollen or cosmetic powder. As a working peasant woman, He Shuangqing had more freedom to move about in public than a woman of a higher status. Nevertheless, her liaison with the scholars was transgressive in a society where women were not supposed to be seen by men.

He Shuangqing died around 1737, aged only twenty-two. The precise date and circumstances of her death were not recorded by her chronicler. He Shuangqing's life is commemorated in the county records of her birthplace, Danyang, as well as those of the county she lived in following her marriage, Jintan. These records provide her with a second name, Qiubi. The Random Records of West-Green refer to He Shuangqing only by her given name; the source for her commonly used surname is unknown.

== Poetry ==
He Shuangqing is celebrated as a writer of song lyrics, a genre of Chinese poetry traditionally associated with the feminine voice. The body of her work that has been preserved consists of fourteen song lyrics and eleven poems written in regulated verse.

The fine fine fragile willow leaves
Quiver and vanish, leaving the mist as before.
Facing the setting sun in an autumn mountain shadow,
I am cheered by your still hearty stem.
You've endured the heavy autumn rains past Double Ninth
And fortunately survived to a brief spell of Indian summer.
I know tonight you'll be dipped in light frost;
As the butterfly departs you'll bow your head.

So many hardships, early autumn cold chills to the bone
And my sickness returns again
Is it just my own Shuangqing heartlessness
To abandon you in the quiet dusk out back?
In the cold moonlight by the balcony rail, sleep impossible,
For several nights on end I never unbutton my jacket.
Useless to apologize for letting you down;
You've blossomed in a destitute home, a place of gloom;
Sorrows need washing away, but there's no more wine.

— "To the Tune of Erlang Shen" (The Chrysanthemum)
translated by Paul S. Ropp

He Shuangqing's poetry is largely autobiographical, centering around images of her rural life and the expression of her feelings about nature and her personal circumstances. Her song lyrics demonstrate an awareness of the poetic canon through her quotation of famous poets and skilful use of established generic conventions. He Shuangqing frequently employs descriptions of objects, flowers, or animals to express her own emotions, a technique known as "singing of objects" (yongwu). Her song lyrics are mild in tone, following the conventions of the feminine "delicate restraint" (wanyue) style. They are notable, however, for their emotional intensity, unique diction, and strong individual voice.

Since the initial publication of her work in 1737, He Shuangqing's song lyrics have been widely anthologized and have received continual praise from literary critics. In 1973, she was recognized as one of the three most significant female lyric poets of the Qing dynasty alongside Wu Zao and Lü Bicheng.

== Representation and Historicity ==
He Shuangqing's work and biographical details were recorded by the scholar Shi Zhenlin (1693 – c. 1779) in his literary notebook, the Random Records of West-Green, which he published in 1738 and later revised. Shi Zhenlin's anecdotal account of He Shuangqing is based on his supposed personal contacts with her during a brief residence in Xiaoshan between the years of 1733 and 1735.

In the Random Records, Shi Zhenlin toys with conflicting notions of He Shuangqing's existence and presents an idealized image of the poet as both a paragon of virtue and a romantic feminine ideal. His exaltation of her modesty and devotion to her husband's family in spite of illness and mistreatment situates her within a tradition of virtuous female figures used for women's moral education in pre-modern China. On the other hand, Shi Zhenlin ascribes He Shuangqing the beauty, talent, and flirtatious nature proper to the heroine of a caizi jiaren romance, a genre of fiction that typically involved an intimate relationship between a young woman and a scholar. Overall, he uses He Shuangqing's story to articulate his own aesthetic vision.

Since the publication of the Random Records of West-Green, He Shuangqing has been regarded as a real person in the Chinese literary canon. Modern scholarship, however, is more divided on the question of her historicity and authorship of the poetry ascribed to her. Grace Fong suggests that there are multiple possible ways to read the relationship between He Shuangqing, her poetry, and Shi Zhenlin's narrative, ranging from total fabrication of the woman and her poetry, to false attribution of poems to a real peasant woman, to the simple edition of works really written by He Shuangqing.

== Translations ==
He Shuangqing's full works were translated into English by Elsie Choy in her 1993 monograph, Leaves of Prayer: the Life and Poetry of Shuangqing, a Farmwife in Eighteenth-Century China. A second edition was published in 2000.

== Bibliography ==
Choy, Elsie, and Zhenlin Shi. Leaves of Prayer: The Life and Poetry of He Shuangqing, a Farmwife in Eighteen-Century China. 2nd ed. Hong Kong: Chinese University Press, 2000.

Fong, Grace S. "De/Constructing a Feminine Ideal in the Eighteenth Century: "Random Records of West-Green" and the Story of Shuangqing." In Writing Women in Late Imperial China, edited by Ellen Widmer and Kang-i Sun Chang, 264-281. Stanford: Stanford University Press, 1997.

Fong, Grace S. "Engendering the Lyric: Her Image and Voice in Song." In Voices of the Song Lyric in China, edited by Pauline Yu, 107-145. Berkeley: University of California Press, 1994.

Gertz, Sunhee Kim, and Paul S. Ropp. "Literary Women, Fiction, and Marginalization: Nicolette and Shuangqing." Comparative Literature Studies 35, no. 3 (1998): 219-54.

Ropp, Paul S. Banished Immortal: Searching for Shuangqing, China's Peasant Woman Poet. Ann Arbor: University of Michigan Press, 2001.
