= Lessons for Women =

Literary work by Ban Zhao

- Traditional Chinese: 女誡
- Simplified Chinese: 女诫
- Literal meaning: women's admonitions
Transcriptions
Standard Mandarin
- Hanyu Pinyin: nǚjiè
- Wade–Giles: Nü^{3}-chieh^{4}

Lessons for Women (Chinese: 女誡), also translated as Admonitions for Women, Women's Precepts, or Warnings for Women, is a work by the Han dynasty female intellectual Ban Zhao (45/49–117/120 CE). As one of the Four Books for Women, Lessons had wide circulation in the late Ming and Qing dynasties (i.e. 16th–early 20th centuries). Ban Zhao made the "Admonitions for Women" for her daughters.

== Outline ==
Lessons outlines the four virtues a woman must abide by, proper virtue, proper speech, proper countenance, and proper conduct. The book itself describes the status and position of women in society. It is a small book and many women had the sections memorized. The book contains only 7 chapters as outlined below.

=== Contents ===
Chapter	Chinese	Pinyin	Translation	Subject
1	卑弱	Bēi ruò	Humbleness	Humbleness defined the relative natural positions between the male and female sexes. Accordingly, the female was deemed to be the more diminutive of the two and naturally, the more humble. Some ancient practices are mentioned which include making a three-day-old baby girl know her lowliness and weakness by placing her under a bed and giving her a spindle to play with in an effort to prepare her for a laborious life. The birth of the baby girl would then be announced to the ancestors and given as an offering to prepare her for the duty of worshipping and keeping up the household.
2	夫妇; 夫婦	Fūfù	Husband and Wife	A husband must govern with dignity and a wife must serve her husband wisely. Otherwise they are broken. A wife that serves her husband restores the natural order of the world and avoids neglecting and destruction of yin and yang, the ultimate goal in a partnership between man and woman. The Classic of Rights argues that women should receive an education before cultural training in order to be a good wife.
3	敬慎	Jìng shèn	Respect and Caution	As defined by the yin-yang duality, in yang men's hardness is his virtue whereas in yin women's gentleness is an asset. Husband and wife should mutually respect each other to maintain the imperative harmony of yin and yang.
4	妇行; 婦行	Fù xíng	Womanly Qualifications	The qualifications deemed necessary for the ideal woman to be respected in society are her virtue, her type of work, and the words she uses (womanly virtue + womanly speech + womanly appearance + womanly work).
5	专心; 專心	Zhuānxīn	Whole-hearted Devotion	This was usually depicted by the woman's devotion to the husband. For example, if the husband were to die, there would be no remarriage for the widow. This was deemed to be the most virtuous task in later dynasties.
6	曲从; 曲從	Qū cóng	Implicit Obedience	A woman must obey what her mother and father in-laws wish regardless of whether or not it goes against her personal opinion in order to fulfill her whole-hearted devotion. Otherwise, she faces eternal disgrace.
7	叔妹	Shū mèi	Harmony Between Younger In-laws	In order for a woman to be respected, she must seek to form positive relationships with her in-laws. She must first gain the favor of the siblings, followed by the respect of the parents, leading to the acceptance of her husband.

=== Precepts for Women ===
Ban Zhao also wrote on the four desired "Precepts for Women" which were intended to guide women in society. These precepts were: womanly virtue, womanly speech, womanly manner, and womanly merit.

"There are four edifying behavioural characteristics for women: the first is womanly virtue (fude), the second is womanly speech (fuyan), the third is womanly manner (fuyong), and the fourth is womanly merit (fugong). What is womanly virtue? She does not distinguish herself in talent and intelligence. What is womanly speech? She does not sharpen her language and speech. What is womanly manner? She does not seek to be outwardly beautiful or ornamented. What is womanly merit? She does not outperform others in her skills and cleverness."

== See also ==
- Book of Han
