= Li Rihua =

Li Rihua (Chinese: 李日華; 1565 – 1635) was a Chinese bureaucrat, artist and art critic from Jiaxing, during the late Ming Dynasty. He wrote an extensive diary, the Weishuixuan Riji (Chinese: 味水軒日記; Diary of the water-tasting gallery), from 1609 to 1616, which detailed his many acquisitions as an art collector. The diary is so named because Li had a reputation as a connoisseur of tea, and was particularly skilled at selecting the best water with which to brew it. He made inscriptions on several paintings of courtesan Xue Susu. In the autumn of 1612, Li's disciples brought him a statue of Guanyin hand-embroidered by Xue and a volume of the Heart Sutra, which Li rated as "extremely exquisite".
