= Ling Shuhua =

Chinese writer (1900–1990)

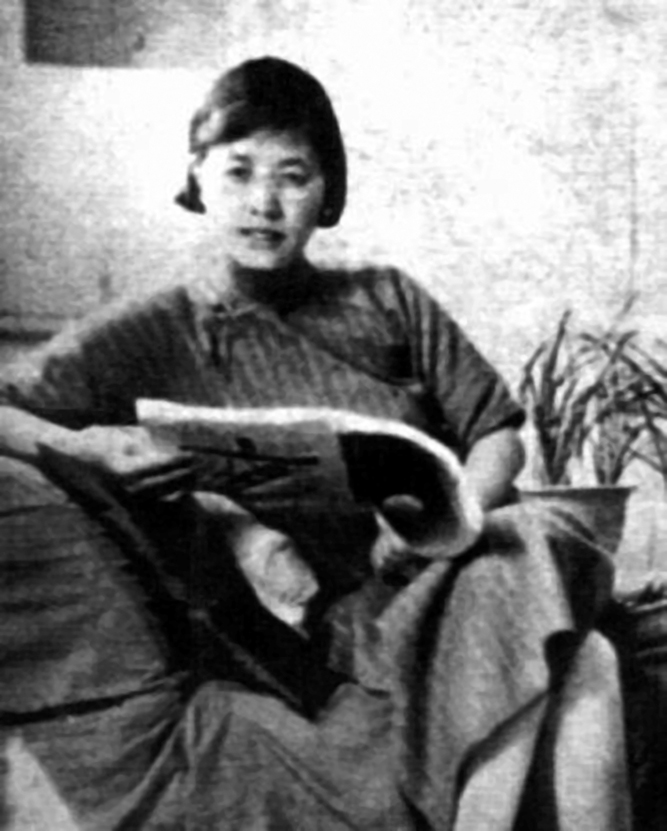
- Born: Ling Ruitang; March 25, 1900; Beijing
- Died: 1990 (aged 89–90)
- Occupation: Writer

Ling Shuhua (simplified Chinese: 凌叔华; traditional Chinese: 凌叔華; March 25, 1900 – 1990), (Note: Some sources cite b. 1904) also known as Su-hua Ling Chen after her marriage, was a Chinese modernist writer and painter whose short stories became popular during the 1920s and 1930s. Her work is characterized by her use of symbolism and boudoir literature.

== Biography ==
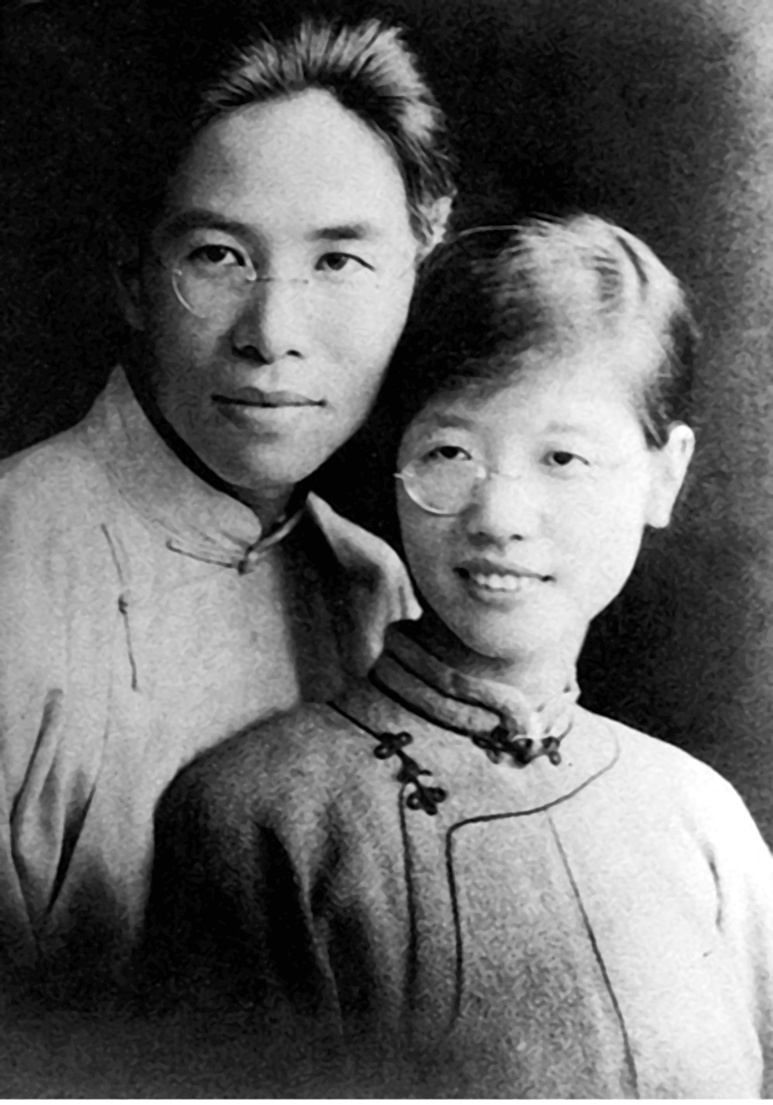
Ling Shuhua and husband Chen Yuan

Ling Shuhua was born Ling Ruitang on March 25, 1904 in Beijing. Shuhua was the daughter of the third concubine of a high ranking Qing official, Ling Fupeng, from the southern province of Canton, who later served as the mayor of Beijing and governor of Hebei Province. She had a younger sister, Amy Ling Shuhao, who married K. K. Chen.

She lived in the familial mansion until the age of seven; she then was sent to Kyoto to study. In 1922, Ling Shuhua enrolled Yenching University in Beijing, studied French, English and Japanese. She went to school alongside the poet and writer Bing Xin.

And in 1924, Ling met Chen Yuan in Beijing. At the time, Chen Yuan was an English professor at Peking University, an influential literary critic, and also an editor for magazines. Chen helped Ling published several articles. However, several of her published articles were accused of plagiarism to foreign articles. Chen rose to fame in a debate with Lu Xun, a famous Chinese writer, because Chen believed Lu disclosed Ling's plagiarism. Through Chen Yuan, Ling got to know many famous writers of the time, such as Shen Congwen.

Ling also practiced calligraphy and was a painter of the scholarly tradition. She also studied painting at the court of the Empress Dowager Cixi, where she became an apprentice to a teacher. Some of her Chinese books have been published with her own inked paintings on the cover.

While at Wuhan University, Ling met Julian Bell in 1935 when he was temporarily an English teacher in China. She also met Yuan Changyin and Su Xuelin. During Bell's short stay in China (he stayed until the year 1937), they had a love affair while Ling was still married. In 1999, Hong Ying published K: The Art of Love, a book based on their relationship that was later banned.

Through her connections with Bell, she was able to start a correspondence with Virginia Woolf, Bell's aunt. The two writers maintained their correspondence between 1938 and 1941. Woolf agreed to read drafts of the memoirs Ling which had begun writing. This manuscript was published in 1953, with the name Ancient Melodies. Ling dedicated this work to Virginia Woolf and Vita Sackville-West, whom she met in England in the 1940s.

She moved again to London in 1947, where she became a Chinese representative for UNESCO. She mostly remained in London except for 1956 when she taught at Nanyang University in Singapore. She moved back to China shortly before her death.

Shuhua had a daughter named Chen Hsiao-Ying.

== Writing style and career ==
In the 1920s and 1930s, Chinese female writers wrote within the subjectivism and sentimentalism that was then associated with feminity. Ling Shuhua thus often used the theme of domesticity. She is also known as a writer of the new boudoir style. Feminism is dominant in her creative thinking and writing. Sensitive social and political issues often arise in her work, denoting the issues of sexism and morality, and also expresses the role and social status that women played in the family at that time.

Ling Shuhua has many famous short stories: The Temple of Flowers, Women, Little Brothers and her collection of essays Love Mountain Dream. And Ling Shuhua is best known for her autobiography Ancient Melodies. She was no ordinary writer, and was known abroad as "speaking with clipped tongue," as she used her "special writing style" in her English work.

In her article Moral Bargain: Reading Three Stories of Ling Shuhua (1988), Zhou Lei mentioned the reasons why Ling chose the subject of moral bargain. Under the social atmosphere at that time, most women were dominated by patriarchy in the process of growing up, and they needed to obey their fathers' decisions. Ling's father, who was a Confucian scholar, would have most likely disapproved of his daughter's work, therefore Ling did not share her writings with him. Moreover, women were expected to perform self-sacrifice within the domestic sphere.

Ling Shuhua also learned classical Chinese during childhood. Most of her writing, however, uses vernacular Chinese. Nevertheless, she did not give up the classical culture she had studied for many years by the use of vernacular Chinese in her literary work, which is evident in her story White Birch. A classical Chinese atmosphere is present in this book, but even such excellent works will be personified and feminized because the author is a woman. In her article Virtue in Silence: Voice and Feiminity in Ling Shuhua's Boudoir Fiction, Eileen Cheng qualifies Ling's image as "modern-yet-modest," which was largely influence by her "feminine" writing style.

Ling is best known for her autobiography Ancient Melodies, in which her distinctive writing style and "Chinese style" English was discovered by Virginia Woolf before they were published. In Woolf's letter to Ling, Woolf suggested that Ling continue to insist on her own free writing style, which should approximate the Chinese language in general meaning. Only in this way can the article retain as much Chinese flavor as possible. At Woolf's suggestion, Ling completed her autobiography. Her autobiography Ancient Melody, that includes short stories, was published in 1953 and became a best-seller. Ancient Melody depicts three China's: the idyllic, the violent and the melancholic China, based on her own experience in the country.

Due to the fact her short stories first appeared in Western journals, Ling Shuhua is often associated with Westernized literary aesthetic. Moreover, she received her education in a Western-Style institution. Her Chinese critics have called her the "Katherine Mansfield of China" (Mansfield was herself nicknamed "the British Chekhov".) Ling was aware of Mansfield's fiction and cited it as an influence on her work.

Vita Sackville-West, who wrote the introduction for Ling's Ancient Melodies, recommended the book for its "Arabian Nights quality". When the book was published, it received immediate acclaim in the West. J.B. Priestly wrote an essay on Ancient Melodies, calling it "the book of the year".

In addition to publishing original work, Ling Shuhua also translated English literature into Chinese Mandarin, notably Katherine Mansfield's work. She then gained international recognition. Ling also self-translated her stories in the 1930s.

=== Public reception ===
In her time, Shuhua was called a writer of the "xin guixiu pai" (the New Boudoir School), suggesting she was conservative in her choice of subject matter and less defiant in her criticism of tradition. Boudoir poetry was considered a "feminine" genre, yet its use was perceived "ancient", puerile and shallow by the new generation of intellectuals. Contradictions were apparent between actual female writing and the fantasy of female writing that was portrayed by male critiques. Moreover, by exposing and criticizing the oppression of men's power implied in her works, she broke the contract that bound women, which was transformed into the subversion of men's power, and also defended the unfair treatment and status of women in the society at that time.

Even though Ling Shuhua was considered a May Fourth writer, her liking of traditional Chinese arts made her identity "ambivalent".

Before she received a lot of public attention in London, Ling Shuhua was already one of the first Chinese women to break the "male monopoly of modern Chinese literature". However, scholars focused on her work from the 1920s rather than the entirety of her career that took place in both China and England.

Her being called "the Chinese Mansfield" was preceded by accusations of plagiarism of Katherine Mansfield and Anton Chekhov. The resemblance between Chekhov and her work lies in their "ironic turns in plot."

== Short stories ==
=== Mid-Autumn Eve ===
The story follows Ching-jen and his feelings towards his life. He desires to be demonstrative and to display affection, but is refrained by Chinese customs, which would not be otherwise if he were American or European, as he thought so. He then expresses his wish to be drunk this night; it is, after all, Mid-Autumn Festival. His foster sister passes away, he is filled with regrets for not seeing her then quarrels with his wife who claims that it is no good to see death on a festive day. Ching-jen's wife packs her things and moves to her mother's. Months later, she has a miscarriage.

The story then shifts protagonist and focuses on Missy, daughter of Chang-ma. She embroiders pillows, and her work is detailed in the story: the covers and cushions, the images she embroidered (lotus, phoenix, etc.) and the colours and shade she used.

=== Once Upon a Time ===
This story is about two schoolgirls, Yunluo and Yingman, who were both cast to play Romeo and Juliet. Yunluo plays Juliet and Yingman plays Romeo. Friendship grows quickly between the two girls and their roles are served by others to pass allusions to a couple. After the play, they remain friends, but it is clear romance is installed between the two, as they sleep together, are affectionate to each other, and Yingman wonders, “What if I weren't a woman?” However, the girls are expected to wed men; such thoughts deeply upset the two who wish to remain together.

During summer vacations, Yingman returns to her parents’ and receives a letter from Yunluo. As summer goes by, however, Yingman receives nothing else from Yunluo, sends off many letters, but still no response. One day, when she walks on campus, she overhears a female saying Yunluo just got married and is now her sister's sister-in-law. Yingman falls on the floor and seems to see Yunluo appear among the crowd of students gathered around her; yet, Yingman cannot tell whether this vision is real or the product of her imagination.

== Publications ==
Long Fiction

- Ancient Melodies (1953)

Short Fiction

- Temple of Flowers 花之诗 (1928)
  - "Intoxicated" 酒后 (1925)
  - "Embroidered Pillows" 绣枕 (1925)
  - "The Night of the Mid-Autumn Festival" 中秋晚 (1925)
  - "The Tea Party" 吃茶 (1925)
  - "After the Tea Party" 茶会以后 (1925)
  - "Temple of Flowers" 花之寺 (1928)
  - "The Helpmate" 太太
  - "The Lucky One" 有福气的人
  - "Once Upon a Time" 说有这么一回事
  - "Spring" 春天
  - "Little Brother" 弟弟
  - "Illness" 病
- Women 女人 (1930)
  - "Young Liu" 小刘
  - "Teacher Li" 李先生
  - "Amah Yang" 杨妈
  - "The Sendoff" 送车
  - "The Mad Poet" 疯了的诗人
  - "A Day of Their Own" 他俩的一日
  - "Women"
- Two Little Brothers 小哥儿俩 (1935)
  - "Little Brothers" 小哥儿俩
  - "Moving House" 搬家
  - "Little Frog" 小蛤蟆
  - "Phoenix" 凤凰
  - "Ying" 小英
  - "Chiyako" 千代子
  - "Katherine" 开瑟琳
  - "Birthday" 生日
  - "Yunlin" 云林
  - "Writing a Letter" 写信
  - "What's the Point of it?" 无聊
  - "Foreign Country" 异国

Translated

- "The Night of Mid-Autumn Festival" 中秋晚
- "Intoxicated" 酒后
- "Once Upon a Time" 说有这么一回事
- "The Helpmate" 太太
- "The Sendoff" 送车
- "Little Liu" 小刘
- "The Lucky One" 有福气的人
- "The Mad Poet" 疯了的诗人
- "Writing a Letter" 写信
- "What's the Point of it?" 无聊

== Works featuring Shuhua ==
- Virginia's Sisters: An Anthology of Women's Writings, London: Aurora Metro Books, 2023. ISBN 9781912430789
