= Hu Yinglin =

Chinese scholar and writer (1551–1602)

Hu Yinglin (Chinese: 胡應麟; 1551–1602), also known as Hu Yuanrui, was a Chinese scholar, writer and bibliophile during the late Ming dynasty. A native of Lanxi, he produced over 1,000 works of scholarship. His two most noted works are the Shaoshishan fang bicong 少室山房筆叢 (Notes from Shaoshishan Studio, a work of historical and literary criticism) and the Shisou 詩藪 (Thickets of criticism), which is a treatise on poetry.

Hu earned the rank of juren (a low-level degree) in the Imperial Examinations of 1576. He travelled extensively collecting works for his personal library, the Eryou shanfang, often selling his clothes or his wife's jewellery in order to fund the purchase of texts. He eventually amassed a collection of more than 42,300 bamboo scrolls and around 20,000 paper books. In later life, prevented from travelling due to ill health, Hu created an "armchair travel studio" (wouyou shi); since he was unable to visit the Five Great Mountains, he had them painted on the walls of his room.

He was one of the first critics of fiction, arguing that it was similar to philosophy. Hu divided fiction into six subgenres:

- Zhiguai, records of strange events
- Chuanqi, tales of the unusual
- Zalu, informal notes
- Congtan, collected discourses
- Bianding, textual inquiry
- Zhengui, rules and admonitions

He was aware, however, that this categorisation was imperfect, since one work could fit into multiple categories, and his system failed to include plays and novels entirely.

Hu was an admirer of the courtesan and artist Xue Susu, praising her "lovely and elegant appearance" and claiming that "Even those famous painters with excellent skills cannot surpass her".
