= Shen Defu =

Chinese bureaucrat and writer (1578 - 1642)

Shen Defu (Chinese: 沈德符) (1578–1642) was a Chinese writer and bureaucrat during the Ming Dynasty. He lived in Zhejiang.

In 1618, he achieved the rank of juren in the Imperial examinations, but failed an exam for promotion to the rank of jinshi a year later. His principal work was the Wanli ye huo bian (Unofficial Gleanings of the Wanli Era, Chinese: 萬曆野獲編), which he completed in 1607. Perhaps because he failed to move beyond the rank of provincial office, in this text he inveighs again the excesses of imperial office holders, including extravagant dress. He was married for several years to the courtesan Xue Susu.
