= Xue Susu =

Chinese Ming Dynasty female artist

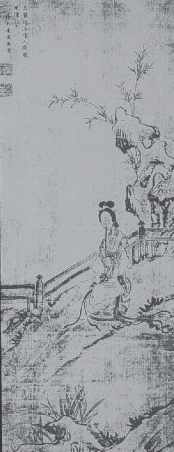
- Girl Playing a Jade Flute by Xue Susu, self-portrait
- Born: around 1564; Suzhou or Jiaxing, Ming China
- Died: 1637 - 1652; Hangzhou
- Other names: Xue Wu, Xuesu, Sujun, Runqing, Runniang, Wulang
- Occupations: courtesan, painter, poet, chess player
- Known for: Mounted archery, painting

Xue Susu
- Chinese: 薛素素
Transcriptions
Standard Mandarin
- Hanyu Pinyin: Xuē Sùsù [ɕœ sûsû]
- Wade–Giles: Hsueh^{1} Su^{4}-su^{4}

Xue Susu (Chinese: 薛素素; also known as Xue Wu (薛五), Xuesu (薛素), Sujun, among other pen names) (c.1564–1650? C.E.) was a Chinese courtesan during the Ming Dynasty. She was an accomplished painter and poet who was particularly noted for her figure paintings, which included many Buddhist subjects. Her works are held in a number of museums both in China and elsewhere. Her skill at mounted archery was commented upon by a number of contemporary writers, as were her masculine, martial tendencies; these were regarded as an attractive feature by the literati of the period.

She lived in Eastern China, residing for most of her life in the Zhejiang and Jiangsu districts. After a career as a celebrated courtesan in Nanjing, Xue Susu was married four times. During her later life, she eventually opted for the life of a Buddhist recluse.

== Biography ==
Xue was born in either Suzhou or Jiaxing (contemporary sources disagree). According to the historian Qian Qianyi she spent at least some of her childhood in Beijing. Due to her poor background, Xue Susu had performed in a circus troupe since she was a child, and there developed the skills of horse riding, shooting a slingshot, and tightrope walking. Later, Xue Susu chose to become a courtesan. She spent her professional life in the Qinhuai pleasure quarter of Nanjing in the 1580s, where she became something of a celebrity among the literati and government officials who frequented the Jiaofang there. She was highly selective in her clientele, accepting only learned and scholarly men as her lovers and declining to proffer her affections for mere financial gain. While still in Jiaxing, Xue Susu met Dong Qichang, a then-unknown scribe and calligrapher who later became the Minister of Rites. At that time, he was still teaching in a private school to make a living. When Dong Qichang met Xue Susu, he was immediately attracted to her, and made a copy of the Heart Sutra for her, along with an inscription and postscript. Under the guidance of Dong Qichang, Xue Susu learned to paint landscapes, orchids, and bamboos with ease. Later she also became proficient at line drawings of figures, flowers, and grass and insects. As an adult, her poems, books, and paintings attracted celebrities. She learned embroidery skills at an early age, and continued embroidering as she grew older. In the autumn of 1612, Li Rihua's disciples brought him an image of Guanyin, hand-embroidered by Xue Susu, and a volume of "Prajna Heart Sutra", which Li Rihua rated as "extremely exquisite".

In the 1590s she returned to Beijing, where the parties and literary gatherings that she hosted, as well as her archery demonstrations, further cemented her reputation. Xue Susu became known as a "Scholarly Woman of Ten Talents" (十能才女). The ten talents were: writing poetry, calligraphy, painting, playing the guqin, playing chess, playing the flute, embroidery, horse riding, tightrope walking, and shooting a slingshot. Xue Susu was proficient in Go and is the only female chess player in the Ming Dynasty whose skill is documented. Xue Susu referred to herself as "a female knight-errant", and she chose the sobriquet Wulang (五郎), meaning "fifth young gentleman", as a nickname. The "female knight-errant" epithet was reiterated by both the bibliophile Hu Yinglin and Fan Yulin, Secretary to the Ministry of War. Apparently fond of martial causes, she was not above attempting to influence military affairs, on one occasion abandoning her lover Yuan Weizhi when he refused to fund an expedition against the Japanese in Korea.

Xue's first marriage was to a general named Li - sometimes called "Li Zhengman" - with her quickly becoming his favorite concubine. After this marriage ended, she became a courtesan again. Later, when her portrait was circulated in the southern minority areas, an officer named Peng Xuanwei saw it and fell in love with her. In order to marry her, Peng sent his agents to shower Xue with money and gifts, with the aim of persuading her to come to Youyang. Upon arrival, Xue realized that she had been tricked, and refused to marry Peng. Enraged, Peng kept Xue confined to his house for more than ten years before finally releasing her. After regaining her freedom, Xue chose to return to the life of a courtesan. At some point after 1605, her career as a courtesan came to an end when she married the playwright and bureaucrat Shen Defu. Finally, after leaving the Shen household, she married Yuan Weizhi (袁微之), a wealthy businessman in Suzhou, as a concubine. Late in life, Xue wanted to have children, but she was past child-bearing age, so this was impossible. Instead, she prayed for all those in love to have the children she could not.

In later life she converted to Buddhism, largely retiring from the world. Even in her eighties, however, she was active in the literary world, entertaining female artists such as Huang Yuanjie at her home on the West Lake during the final days of the Ming Dynasty. With her Buddhist friend Yang Jiangzi (the sister of Xue's fellow courtesan Liu Rushi), she made pilgrimages to sacred sites such as Mount Lu and Mount Emei. The date of her death is uncertain; some sources suggest she may have lived into the 1650s, whilst others put her death in the late 1630s or early 1640s. Qian Qianyi mentions her death in a work published in 1652, so she must have died before this date.

Xue Susu had an inkstone called the Zhi Inkstone (脂砚), kept in a highly decorated box. The bottom of the box is engraved with the words "Wanli Guiyou Gusu Wu Wanyou", and the four characters "红颜素心" (hongyansuxin, 'beautiful face, pure heart') are inscribed on the upper right. The inside of the lid is engraved with a portrait of Xue Susu with a fine dark pattern, which was painted by Qiu Zhu, the daughter of Qiu Ying. On the bottom of the inkstone is engraved small characters in official script: "The inkstone treasured by Zhiyanzhai will be preserved forever." There is a saying that the Zhiyanzhai in "A Dream of Red Mansions" may be named after Xue Susu Zhiyan.

== Paintings ==
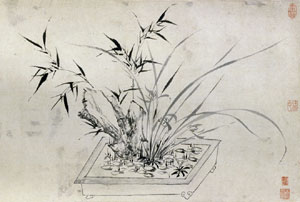
Lan Zhu Song Mei Tu (Orchid, Bamboo, Pine and Plum) by Xue Susu

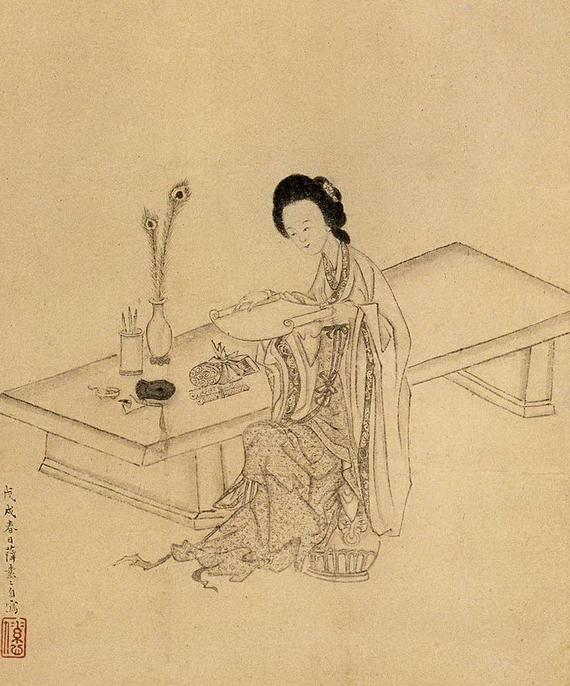
Beautiful Woman in Plain Lines by Xue Susu

Already an accomplished painter in her teenage years, Xue was well known for her artistic talent. Her work was considered similar to that of Chen Chun, who was an inspiration for many of her era. One of her paintings was considered "the most accomplished work of its kind in the whole of the Ming period", and contemporary art critics regarded her as "a master of technique". Hu Yinglin considered her to be at the pinnacle of contemporary painting, asking, "What famous painter with skilled hands can surpass her?" and claiming that "[she] surpasses anyone in the painting of bamboo and orchids." She was also keenly admired by eminent painter and art critic Dong Qichang, who was inspired to copy the entire Heart Sutra in response to Xue's painting of Guanyin; he claimed that "None [of Xue Susu's works] lacks an intention and spirit that approaches the divine." Although she painted the standard subjects of landscapes, bamboo and blossoms (being particularly fond of orchids), Xue was noted for her work in figure painting, which was a comparatively unusual subject for courtesans. Examples of her paintings are displayed at the Honolulu Museum of Art and the Asian Art Museum of San Francisco.

== Poetry ==
Xue regularly accented her paintings with her own poems, and published two volumes of writing, only one of which survives. Hua suo shi Chinese: 花瑣事 (Trifles about Flowers) is a collection of short prose essays and anecdotes about various flowers, whilst Nan you cao Chinese: 南游草 (Notes from a Journey to the South), which has been lost, apparently contained a selection of her poems regarding life as a courtesan. A number of these were collected in various anthologies from the late Ming and early Qing dynasties.

Hu Yinglin wrote that, "Her poetry, although lacking in freedom, shows a talent rare among women." Moving in literary circles, Xue also provided the subject matter for many contemporary poets. Xu Yuan, another female poet of the period, describes Xue's allure:

Lotus blossoms as she moves her pair of arches
Her tiny waist, just a hand's breadth, is light enough to dance on a palm
Leaning coyly against the East Wind
Her pure colour and misty daintiness fill the moon.

Hu Yinglin wrote of Xue:

Who transplanted this flower of renowned species to the Imperial garden?
Hers is a smile worth a thousand pieces of gold
She lives near the mooring like Taoye [Peach Leaf], under the wind
She resembles rushes, standing in the water, embracing the moon, and humming
The red phoenix is half-raised because of her mate
Her eyebrows are slightly frowning, expecting a heart to share
This is the moment to read Eternal Regret, the poem of Bo Juyi
Beside the bed, she is awaiting the lute of jade.

Xue's own works deal with a variety of themes, from the mildy erotic:

Inside the city walls of stone in the pleasure quarter
I feel deeply mortified that my talents outshine all the others
The river glitters, the waters clear, and the seagulls swim in pairs
The sky looks hollow, the clouds serene, and the wild geese fly in rows
My embroidered dress partly borrows the hue of hibiscus
The emerald wine shares the scent of lotus
If I did not reciprocate your feelings
Would I dare to feast with you, Master He?

to the romantic:

This lovely night I think of you, wondering whether you will return
The lonely lamp shines on me, casting a faint shadow
I clutch one lone pillow; there is nobody to talk to
Moonlight floods the deserted courtyard; tears soak my dress.

to the whimsically philosophical:

Full of aroma is the taste of wine beneath the bloom
Tinged in azure the gate surrounded by bamboo
In solitude I watch the seagulls fly across the sky
Carefree and content, I feel fully satisfied.

Xue often exchanged poems and paintings with her clientele, receiving their own artworks in exchange.

== Archery ==
Whilst she excelled at poetry, painting, and embroidery, the skill that set Xue apart from other courtesans was her talent for archery. Her mastery of a traditionally masculine art gave her an air of androgyny that was considered highly attractive by the literati of the time. Having practiced in Beijing as a child, she furthered her skills during a sojourn in the company of a military officer in the outlying regions of China. The horsemen of the local tribes there were impressed with her shooting, and she became something of a local celebrity. Later in life she gave public demonstrations in Hangzhou, which drew large audiences. Hu Yinglin describes one such performance:

"She is able to shoot two balls from her crossbow one after another and make the second ball strike the first and break it in mid-air. Another trick she can do is to place a ball on the ground, and, by pulling the bow backwards with her left hand, while her right hand draws the bow from behind her back, hit it. Out of a hundred shots, she does not miss a single one.

The poet Lu Bi recalls another trick shot performed by Xue: "When the servant girl takes a ball in her hand and places it on top of her head / She [Xue] turns around, hits it with another ball, and both balls fall to the ground."
