= Xu Wei =

Ming Dynasty painter (1521–1593)

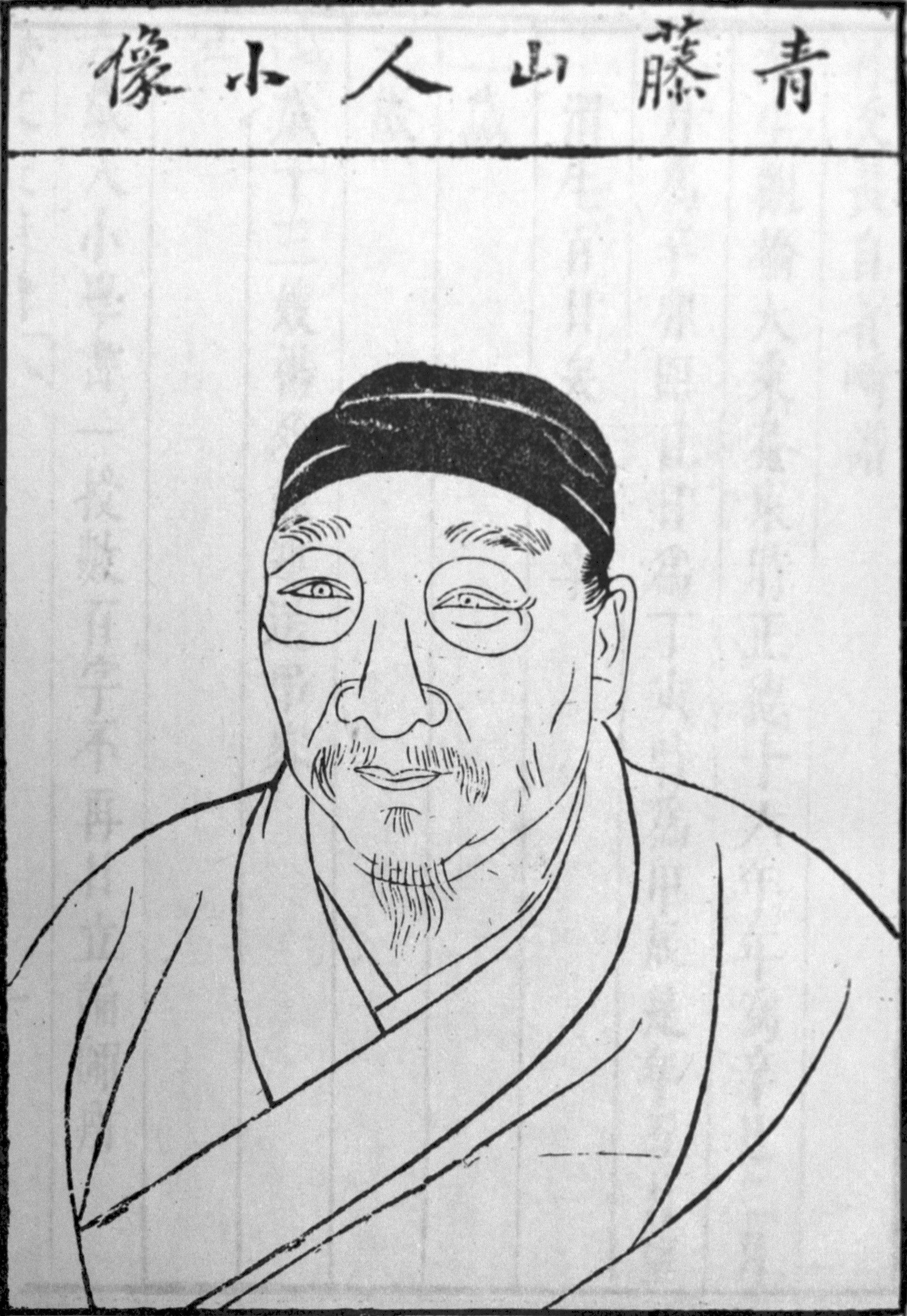
- Born: 1521
- Died: 1593 (aged 71-72)
- Occupations: Painter, poet, writer, playwright, calligrapher
- Children: Xu Du, Xu Mei
- Relatives: Xu Cong (father)

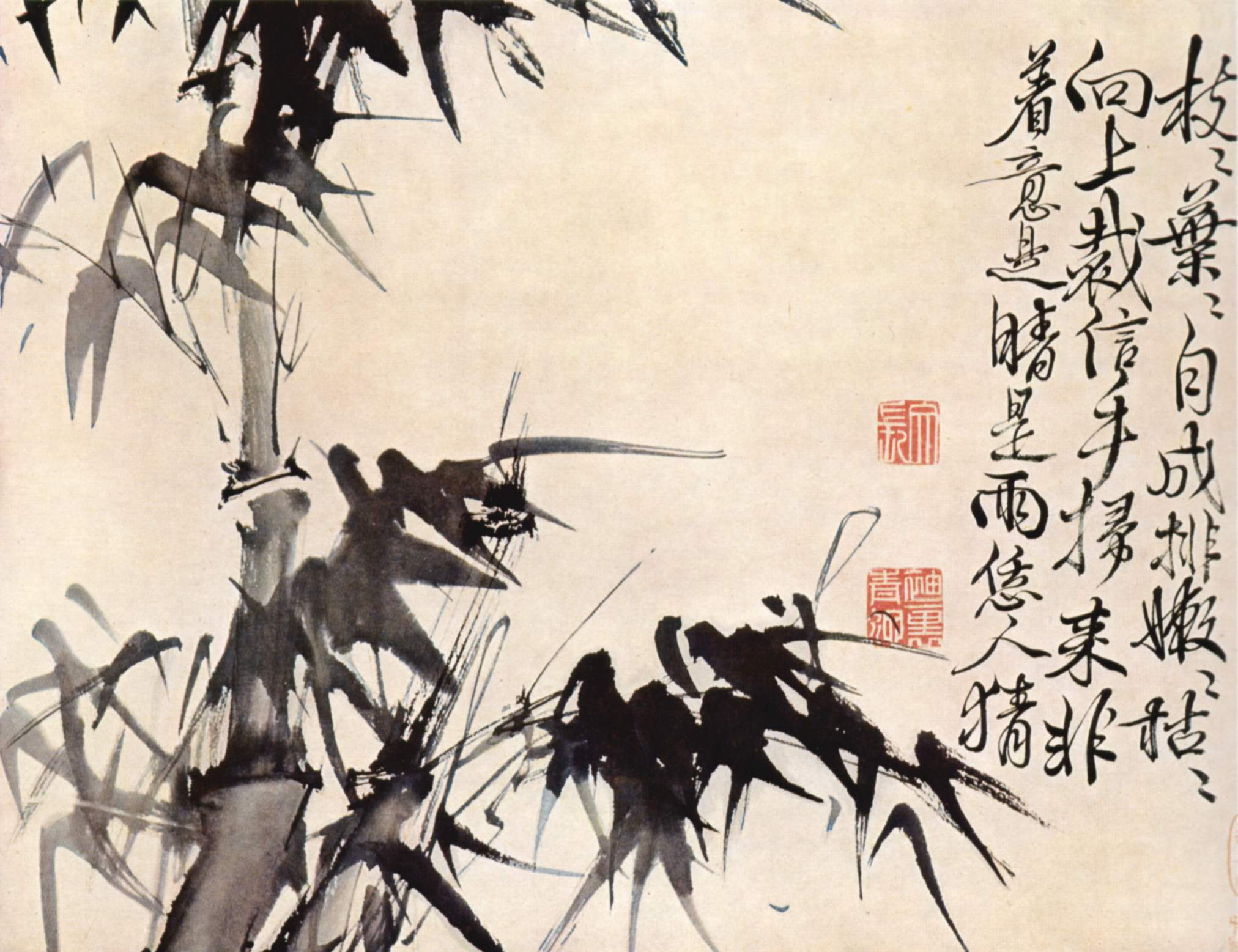
Bamboos

Xu Wei (Chinese: 徐渭; pinyin: Xú Wèi; Wade–Giles: Hsü Wei, 1521–1593), also known as Qingteng Shanren (Chinese: 青藤山人; pinyin: Qīngténg Shānrén), was a Chinese painter, playwright, poet, and tea master during the Ming dynasty.

== Life ==
Xu's courtesy names were Wenqing (文清) and then later Wenchang (文長). His pseudonyms were "The Mountain-man of the Heavenly Pond" (天池山人 Tiānchí Shānrén), "Daoist of the Green Vine House" (青藤道士 Qīngténg Dàoshì) and "The Water and Moon of the Bureau's Farm" (署田水月 Shǔtián Shuǐ Yuè). Born in Shanyin (modern Shaoxing, Zhejiang), Xu was raised by a single mother who died when he was 14. At 21, he married a woman who died five years later. Though he passed the county civil examination at age 20, Xu was never able to pass the provincial civil service examinations, even after attempting it eight times. Nevertheless, Xu was employed by Hu Zongxian, Supreme Commander of the Jiangsu-Zhejiang-Fujian coastal defense against the wokou pirates.

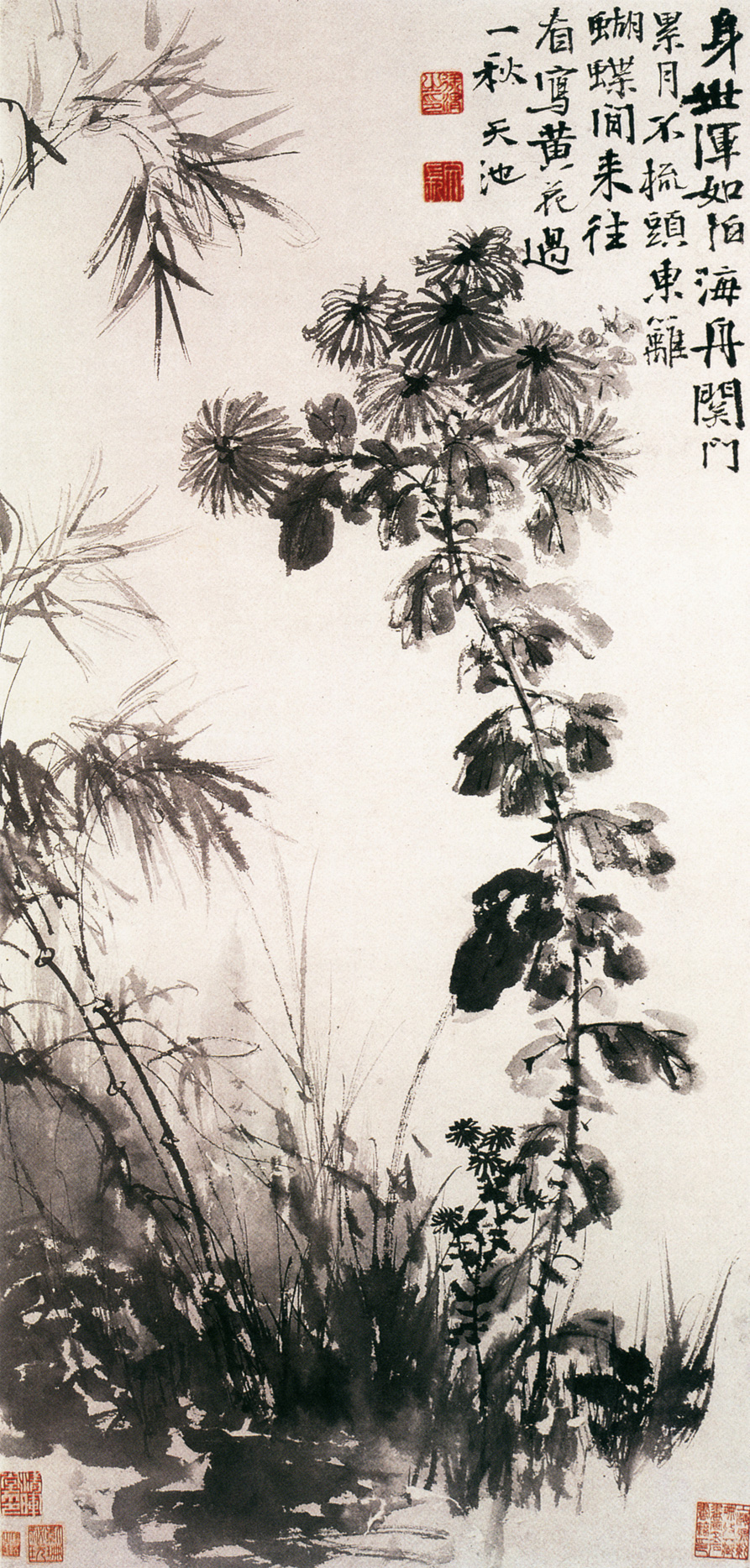
Chrysanthemums and Bamboos (菊竹图) by Xu Wei, Liaoning Museum

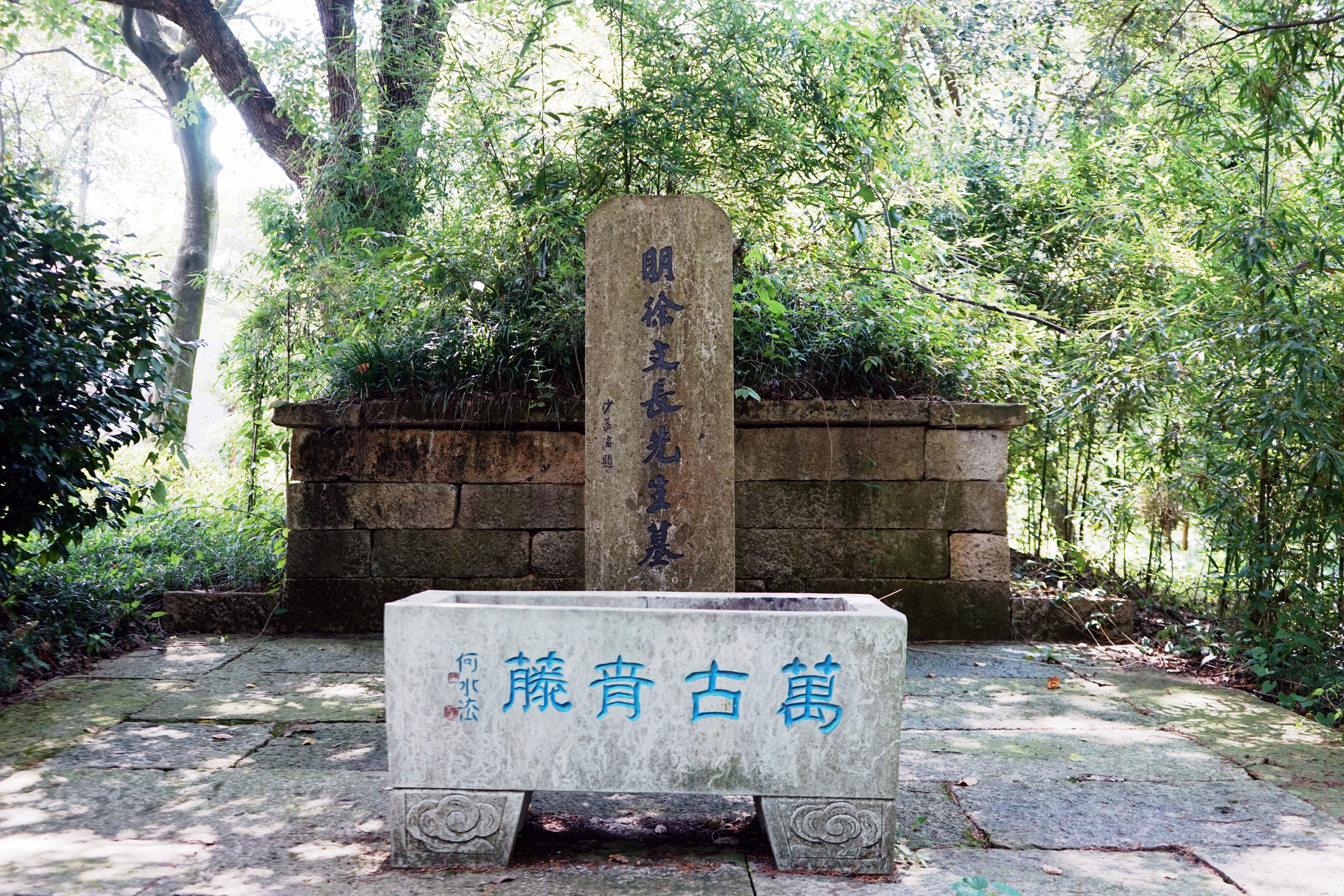
Xu Wei's tomb

After General Hu was arrested and lost his job, Xu Wei feared a similar fate for himself. Xu became mentally distraught at this juncture, attempting to commit suicide nine times, such as by axing himself in the skull and drilling both of his ears. His mental imbalance led to his killing of his second wife Zhang (張氏) after becoming paranoid that she was having an affair. As a punishment for this murder, he was jailed for seven years until his friend Zhang Yuanbian (張元忭) from the Hanlin Academy managed to free him at age of 53. It is possible Xu Wei suffered from bipolar disorder, a condition actually recognized in China at this time. Xu spent the rest of his life painting, but with little financial success.

== Literary career ==
Xu was a playwright as well. He produced the works Singing in Place of Screaming (simplified Chinese: 歌代啸; traditional Chinese: 歌代嘯; pinyin: gē dài xiào), as well as the treatise on southern drama Nanci Xulu (simplified Chinese: 南词叙录; traditional Chinese: 南詞敘錄; pinyin: Náncí Xùlù).

He wrote the four play cycle known as Four Cries of a Gibbon (simplified Chinese: 四声猿; traditional Chinese: 四聲猿; pinyin: Sì Shēng Yuán). This cycle consists of the following four plays:

- The Mad Drummer Plays The Yuyang Triple Rolls (Mi Heng) (simplified Chinese: 狂鼓史渔阳三弄; traditional Chinese: 狂鼓史漁陽三弄; pinyin: Kuáng gǔ shǐ yú yángsān nòng) - describes the crimes of Cao Cao
- Zen Master Yu Has a Dream of Cuixiang (simplified Chinese: 玉禅师翠乡一梦; traditional Chinese: 玉禅師翠鄉一夢; pinyin: Yù chánshī cuì xiāng yī mèng) - a Buddhist story
- The Female Mulan Joins the Army in Place of Her Father (simplified Chinese: 雌木兰替父从军; traditional Chinese: 雌木蘭替父從軍; pinyin: Cí mùlán tì fù cóngjūn) - describes Hua Mulan
- The Girl Graduate Rejects the Female Phoenix and Gains the Male Phoenix (simplified Chinese: 女状元辞凰得凤; traditional Chinese: 女狀元辭凰得鳳; pinyin: Nǚ zhuàngyuán cí huáng dé fèng) - describes Huang Chonggu

Xu's dramatic efforts often deal with women's themes.

The British orientalist Arthur Waley, in his introduction to the 1942 translation of Jin Ping Mei argued that Xu Wei was the author but later scholars have not been convinced.

Xu Wei was also a poet in shi style. Xu's collected works in 30 chapters exists with a commentary by the late Ming writer Yuan Hongdao. Xu cared most about calligraphy and then poetry. A modern typeset edition of Xu Wei's collected works, Xu Wei ji, was published by the Zhonghua Publishing House in Beijing in 1983. Previously a 17th-century edition of his collected works known as the Xu Wenchang sanji was reproduced in Taiwan in 1968. In 1990 a book length study of Xu Wei concludes that Xu Wei can be seen as a "scholar in cotton clothes" or buyi wenren (布衣文人), a scholar who failed the civil service examination, yet became active in the realm of literature. Many such individuals appeared in the late 16th and early 17th centuries and attached themselves to officials or became independent in late Ming China.

== Painting style ==
Xu Wei used "splattered ink [that] utilises considerable quantities of ink that are practically poured onto the painting surface".

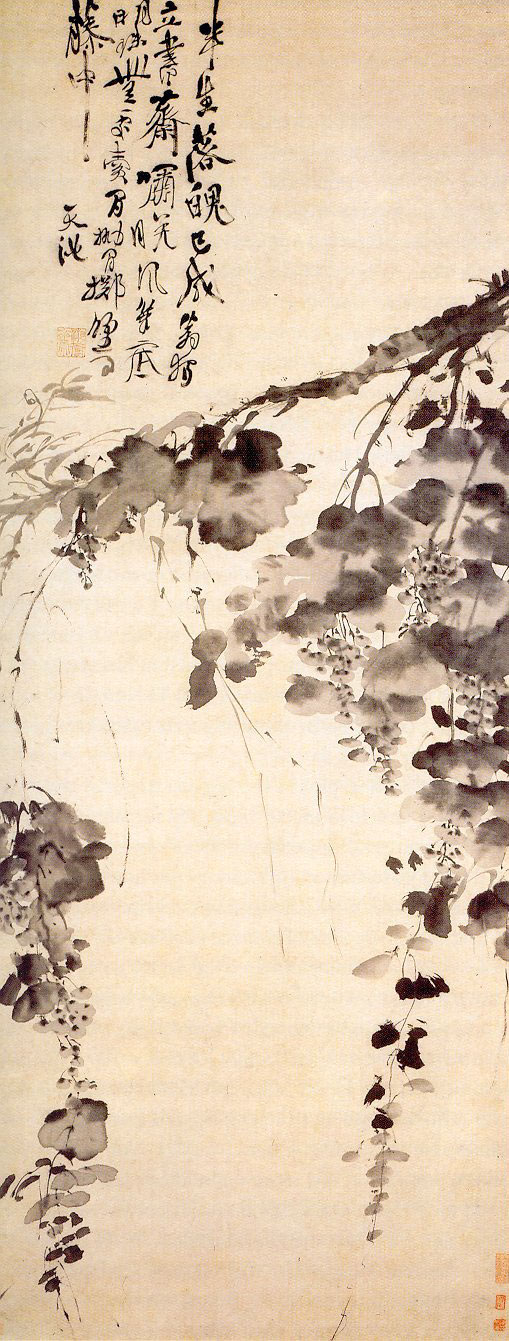
Grapes (葡萄), Xu Wei, Palace Museum

== See also ==
- Eight Eccentrics of Yangzhou
- Wu Changshuo
- Qi Baishi
- Bada Shanren
