= Liu Ying (writer) =

Chinese writer

- 柳营
- Born: Longyou County, Zhejiang, China
- Occupations: Novelist, short story writer

Liu Ying (Chinese: 柳营; born February 1974) is a Chinese writer of novels and short stories. Her work revolves around the exploration of women life in modern China in light of historical, political and economic changes. She published ten novels, and many short-stories. Her early novel, "The Attic", was adapted into a film with the same name.

== Life ==
Liu was born in February 1974 in Longyou County, Zhejiang to a working-class family. She has an older sister and a younger brother.

In 2001, at the age of 27, Liu Ying suffered from depression and severe disc herniation. Being confined to close quarters for a long time Liu Ying began to write novels. A year later her collection of short stories "Attic" was published, become an instant hit and launched her writing career. In 2004 "Attic" was made into a Chinese motion picture and in 2006 Liu Ying published her first long novel "Ghost Tree".

In 2005 she joined China Writers Association and entered Lu Xun Literary Institute in Beijing. Later Liu Ying moved back to Zhejiang and settled in Hangzhou.

In 2012, Liu Ying immigrated to the United States to continue her literary career. "Sister" was published early 2019, and in less than two months was completely sold out and second editions were printed.

== Career ==
Liu Ying novels may be characterized as fiction focusing around women life struggles in a patriarchal China. Liu Ying novels create a vivid atmosphere, full of nature, smells, tastes, and tactile details. Liu Ying dives deep into the human soul, emotions, and psychology while staying in touch with modern Chinese history, cultural changes, economy, and religion. Liu Ying developed her own unique style which is quiet and powerful at the same time that befits classic Chinese novels.

Liu Ying’s writing style and novels often reflect themes associated with her personal experiences. Raised in a rural village in a society where boys were often given greater opportunities than girls, she has spoken about experiencing depression, social anxiety, and bullying during her early life. These experiences later influenced the themes explored in her literary works. Through her novels and public appearances, Liu Ying has discussed issues relating to women’s resilience, dignity, and personal struggle

In 2019, Liu Ying meet with readers, as part of an introduction road-show to her book "Sister". Liu Ying was recorded giving a talk in her home-town discussing her style, life philosophy, and experiences.

A most recent review of Liu Ying book "Sister", published in 2021

Liu Ying's work is currently being translated into several languages.

Liu Ying is finishing up her next book, while some of her earlier work is being translated into English.

Liu Ying latest short story published in HongKong

Liu Ying self-published Kindle book

== Works ==
Title	Year	ISBN/ASIN
Attic 阁楼	2002	9787506329873
Liang Shanbo and Zhu Yingati 梁山伯与祝英台	2005	9787213029875
Tree Ghost 树鬼	2006	9787531330226
Light as flesh 淡如肉色	2010	9787222060913
Delicious Mushroom 蘑菇好滋味	2012	9787225041636
Deep in my place 我之深处	2013	9787506364652
Ah Bu 阿布	2013	9787539179711
Little Heaven 小天堂	2015	9787506081887
Sister 姐姐	2019	9787530218419
Honey & Spice 辣与蜜糖	2020	ASIN : B08JRW2H5H
