= Duan Shuqing =

Chinese poet

Duan Shuqing (Chinese: 端淑卿; c. 1510 – c. 1600) was a Chinese poet of the Ming dynasty.

== Life ==
Born in Dangtu County in Anhui to a scholarly family, her father Duan Tingbi taught her how to read. She traveled with him and read many of the classics, especially the Lienü zhuan. She married the Confucian scholar Rui Ru.

She wrote different styles of verse and they were said to follow Tang dynasty poetry models. One of her poems, Taibai Tower, was dedicated to Li Bai, a famous poet of that age.

== Sources ==
- Kang-i Sun Chang; Haun Saussy; Charles Yim-tze Kwong (1999). Women writers of traditional China: an anthology of poetry and criticism. Stanford University Press.
