= Xu Yuan (poet) =

Ming dynasty Poet (c.1560-c.1620)

- Born: c. 1560; Suzhou
- Died: c. 1620
- Other name: Xiaoshu
- Occupation: Poet
- Notable work: Shuttling Chants (1613)
- Spouse: Fan Yunlin
- Father: Xu Shitai

Xu Yuan (Chinese: 徐媛; pinyin: Xú Yuàn; Wade–Giles: Hsü Yüan, c. 1560 - 1620), courtesy name Xiaoshu(小淑), was a Ming dynasty child prodigy and poet during the reign of the Wanli Emperor (1563–1620). Born in Suzhou to the imperial retainer Xu Shitai, she became regarded as one of the foremost female poets from Suzhou. She married fellow poet Fan Yunlin (范允臨), who held various official posts in the Ming dynasty. Xu Yuan often accompanied her husband to where he was assigned and left behind poems detailing her experiences. She retired in her native Suzhou along with her husband, who published a collection of her poetry and prose in 1613. Xu Yuan was known for her poetry to other women such as the courtesan and artist Xue Susu which often described their physical beauty and used intimate language.

== Biography ==
=== Family and early years ===
Xu Yuan was born in Suzhou, China during the rule of the Wanli Emperor to Xu Shitai, who was the chief minister of the Court of the Imperial Stud and to a mother whose name is not recorded. Little about Xu Yuan's early life is recorded, as the exact year of her birth and death is unknown. Born to a family of scholars, she was provided instruction from a young age and it is recorded that she was such a prodigy in the literary arts that she was praised as a reincarnation of Xie Daoyun. She lived a relatively carefree life in childhood, and often exchanged poems with her siblings and cousins.

=== Adulthood ===
Upon reaching adulthood, Xu Yuan took the name Xiaoshu and wed a scholar named Fan Yunlin. As Fan Yunlin's family did not have much in the way of wealth, she worked weaving cloth and selling jewelry in order to allow her husband to focus on his studies. Though the two lived in relative poverty, they were seen as an ideal couple who were equally matched in both their love for each other and their work. During the Ming dynasty it came to be believed that developing talents eroded the morality of women, a notion which some educated women like Xu Yuan resisted. She broke with the societal expectations of a virtuous housewife and declared in her poetry that she would focus on her literary interests instead of domestic work.

Fan Yunlin's studies would pay off and he would be given a number of official positions such as vice-commissioner, secretary in the Ministry of War, and in the Ministry of Works that would see the couple travel to places such as Nanjing, Yunnan, Fujian and Guizhou as Fan Yunlin was assigned to these locations, Xu Yuan would accompany him. Allowed to experience life outside of the confines of what was traditionally expected of a woman in this period, she would leave a record of her experiences in her writing. When Fan Yunlin was off duty, the couple were known to associate with the literati in Suzhou.

Beyond the literati, she was also known to associate with courtesans of high status such as Xue Susu, as well as less renowned courtesans.She was also known to be good friends with Lu Qingzi, a gentrywoman who likewise associated with and wrote verses about courtesans. As they were both good friends, the two often exchanged poems, and influenced one another's work.

=== Retirement and later years ===
The death of her parents and the loss of a grandson, as well as her husband's dissatisfaction with his career, effected her later in life and she turned to Buddhism. Around 1604, Fan Yunlin and Xu Yuan retired and moved their family back to Suzhou and devoted themselves to the arts. In 1613, Fan Yunlin published a collection of her work titled Shuttling Chants which contained prose and poetry that detailed the time that Xu Yuan spent working as a weaver to support Fan Yunlin's education.

After she died the critic Ji Xian's early Qing dynasty Guixiu ji (Anthology of Talents of the Women’s Quarters) featured thirty-two of Xu Yuan's poems, the highest amount represented within the collection.

== Poetry ==
Like many poets, Xu Yuan is said to have looked up to the Tang dynasty masters. Despite her family background and her upbringing, she defied conventional expectations for a gentrywoman and flaunted cultural norms by associating with, and composing poems for, prostitutes, courtesans, daoists, and Gējì. Among these notable poems was one dedicated to the courtesan Xue Susu, whom she likely met through her husband, who admired Xue Susu from her days as a courtesan.

In one such poem, she wrote about Xue Susu's beauty and remarked upon the courtesan's bound feet. Both Fan Yunlin and Xu Yuan comprised poems appreciating Xue Susu, and one such poem is present on one of Xue Susu's paintings. Though her poetry was well received by her readers, the work was not without its contemporary critics. The poet Fang Mengshi wrote that Xu Yuan's writing was mediocre and without talent, while poet and artist Liang Mengzhao believed the odd language Xu Yuan used in her poetry was the result of trying to censor what was on her mind which made it dull. The criticism did not appear to hinder her readership, nor did the critics make any overt mention of her writing about courtesans and gējì.

Xu Yuan also associated, and wrote poems about, less famous gējì and prostitutes as demonstrated by her poem "Geji Anqing" and a series of five poems titled "Written in Jest for Sanli the Singing Girl". While her explicit writing about feminine beauty were considered bad taste, same-sex attraction between women was not widely forbidden in seventeenth century China. She frequently used the language of a lover in the poems she wrote to other women.

=== Selection of Collected Works ===
- Poems by Xu Yuan: 20 volumes (edited by Zheng Wen'ang, Ming dynasty). Zhang Zhengyue, 1620, the first year of the Taichang reign (1620). [名媛彙詩﹕二十卷(明鄭文昂編)。張正岳明泰昌元年(1620)]
- Collection of Poems by Famous Women: Thirty-six Volumes (edited by Chung Sing-chi). Late Ming dynasty (1621–1644) [名媛詩歸﹕三十六卷(鍾惺點次)。明末(1621–1644)]
- Ancient and Modern Women's History: 12 volumes, Poetry Collection: 8 volumes, with Details of Surnames and Characters: 1 volume (edited by Zhao Shijie, Ming dynasty). Ming Chongzhen (1628–1644) [古今女史﹕十二卷﹐詩集﹕八卷﹐附姓氏字里詳節﹕一卷(明趙世杰輯)。明崇禎(1628–1644)]
- The First Compilation of Poetry by Famous Women (edited by Wang Duanshu, Qing dynasty). Qing dynasty (1667)[名媛詩緯初編(清王端淑輯)。清康熙六年(1667)]
- Historical Famous Women: A Compendium of Literature in Two Volumes (edited by Wang Xiuqin and selected by Hu Wenkai, Republic of China). The Commercial Press, Republic of China, February 1947, first edition. [歷代名媛文苑簡編:二卷(民國王秀琴編,胡文楷選訂)。商務印書館民國三十六年(1947)二月初版]

== Works cited ==
- Berg, Daria (2013). Women and the literary world in early modern China, 1580-1700. Routledge Studies in the Early History of Asia. New York: Routledge. pp. 53–54. ISBN 978-0-415-53341-6.
- Chang, Kang-i Sun (1997-12-01), "CHAPTER 9 Ming-Qing Women Poets and the Notions of "Talent" and "Morality"", Culture and State in Chinese History, Stanford University Press, pp. 252–253, doi:10.1515/9780804765060-013, ISBN 978-0-8047-6506-0
- Chang, Kang-i Sun; Saussy, Haun; Kwong, Charles Yim-tze (1999). Women Writers of Traditional China: An Anthology of Poetry and Criticism. Stanford University Press. ISBN 9780804732314.
- Fong, Grace S. (2008). Herself an Author: Gender, Agency, and Writing in Late Imperial China. Honolulu: University of Hawai'i Press. pp. 132–135. ISBN 978-0-8248-3186-8.
- Hammond, Kenneth James; Stapleton, Kristin Eileen, eds. (2008). The Human Tradition in Modern China. The human tradition around the world series. Lanham: Rowman & Littlefield. p. 25. ISBN 978-0-7425-5465-8. OCLC 154678483.
- Ko, Dorothy (1994). Teachers of the inner chambers: women and culture in seventeenth-century China (Nachdr. ed.). Stanford, Calif: Stanford Univ. Pr. pp. 266–269. ISBN 978-0-8047-2359-6.
- Lan, Kai-Yi (2022). Gender and Medicine in the Ming Dynasty: Tan Yunxian's (1461-1556) Medical Case Book (Thesis). Universität Würzburg. pp. 21–22. doi:10.25972/opus-28886. Archived from the original on 2024-09-12.
- Lee, Lily Xiao Hong; Wiles, Sue (2014). Biographical dictionary of Chinese women. University of Hong Kong Libraries publications. Armonk (N.Y.): M. E. Sharpe. pp. 514–515. ISBN 978-0-7656-4314-8.
- Park, J. P. (2012). Art by the book: painting manuals and the leisure life in late Ming China. A China program book. Seattle [Wash.] London: University of Washington press. pp. 184–185. ISBN 978-0-295-99176-4.
- Wetzel, Jean (January 2002). "Hidden Connections: Courtesans in the Art World of the Ming Dynasty". Women's Studies. 31 (5): 661–662. doi:10.1080/00497870214051. ISSN 0049-7878.
- Widmer, Ellen (2015-01-01), "20 Letters as Windows on Ming-Qing Women's Literary Culture", A History of Chinese Letters and Epistolary Culture, Brill, pp. 757–758, doi:10.1163/9789004292123_022, ISBN 978-90-04-29212-3
