= Bu Feiyan =

Chinese name; the family name is Xin

This is a Chinese name; the family name is Xin.

Xin Xiaojuan (Chinese: 辛晓娟 born 11 July 1981), whose pen name Bu Feiyan (步非烟) is taken from a Tangchuanqi (short stories of the Tang dynasty) by Huangfu Mei, is a Chinese female writer known for her wuxia novels. Born in Chengdu, Sichuan Province, she studied at the Chinese Department of Peking University in 1999, awarded with a master's degree in ancient Chinese literature in 2006 and a Doctor's degree from the Chinese Department in 2012. In 2004, she began to serialize works on magazines, namely Jinguchuanqi, Wuxiagushi, and Wuxiaxiaoshuo.

Her major works include Huayinliushao series, Wulinkezhan series, Renjianliudao: Xiuluodao, and Kunlunchuanshuo series. A pioneer of feminine Wuxia novels, Bu Feiyan boasts fantastic imagination and diversified writing styles, her works often intertwined with fantasy and myth.

== Awards ==
- Wen Rui’an Shenzhouqixia Awards (2004)
- The Second Prize, Chinese National Wuxia Story Competition for University Students (2004)
- Wuxia Literature Awards (2005)

== Major works ==
=== Finished series ===
Huayinliushao series (华音流韶系列): Zizhaotianyin(紫诏天音), Fengyueliancheng (风月连城), Bi’antiandu (彼岸天都), Haizhiyao (海之妖), Mantuluo (曼荼罗), Tianjianlun (天剑伦), Xuejiayi (雪嫁衣), Fanhuazhuiying (梵花坠影)

Wulinkezhan series (武林客栈系列): Wulinkezhan: the Riyao Volume (武林客栈·日曜卷), Wulinkezhan: the Yueque Volume (武林客栈·月阙卷), Wulinkezhan: the Xinglian Volume (武林客栈·星涟卷)

Tianwu Series (天舞系列): Tianwu: Moyun (天舞·摩云)Tianwu: Yulong (天舞·御龙),Tianwu: Zangxue (天舞·葬雪),Yunzhongyilan (云中漪兰)

Renjianliudao Series (人间六道系列):Xiuluodao (修罗道)

Jiuquemenghua Series (九阙梦华系列):Jieyoudao (解忧刀), Jueqinggu (绝情蛊)

Kunlunchuanshuo Series (昆仑传说系列):Kunlunjiehui (昆仑劫灰), Yueyingchuanshuo (月影传说), Tianjinyunshang (天烬云殇)

Wuyangfengyunlu Series (舞阳风云录系列):Yuechuqiushan (月出秋山), Furonghualuo (芙蓉花落), Saishangqiufeng (塞上秋风), Fantianbaojuan (梵天宝卷), Changkongjianjue (长空剑诀), Xuelingmeixiang (血令梅香), Tianluobaozang (天罗宝藏)

Qizongzui Series (七宗罪系列):Qingluoji (青螺髻), Duotianyi (堕天翼), Linglongxin (玲珑心), Dingxiangshe (丁香舌), Chuncongzhi (春葱指), Yin’erfeng (阴耳风), Chenzhiwan (沉脂腕)

=== Unfinished series ===
Meiguidiguo Series (玫瑰帝国系列):Duotianshizhixi (堕天使之心), Panduolazhihe (潘多拉之盒), Jingjiniaozhiguan (荆棘鸟之冠), Heiyudiezhiyi (黑羽蝶之翼), Baiqiangweizhiji (白蔷薇之祭), Longzhiyuyi (龙之羽翼), Wumianzhihou (无冕之后), Shi (师), Kaisa (凯撒)

Yuntianzhiwai: Mulanhuakai Series (云天之外·木兰花开系列)

=== Other works ===
Jianxiaqingyuan (剑侠情缘)

Xuanwutiangong (玄武天工)

Feiyutianxia (飞羽天下)

Guizudegongzhu (鬼族的公主)

Wuyifengliu (乌衣风流)

Huangjinshidai (黄金时代)

Huayingeshieryuehua (华音阁十二月花)

Shijianqiyetan (诗剑七夜谈)

== Controversy ==
In 2006, on the awarding ceremony of the 3rd Jinguchuanqi Wuxia Literature Awards and Huangyi Wuxia Literature Special Awards, Xin asserted, "Our new generation of Wuxia novel writers should be brave enough to initiate a revolution against Jin Yong." Her words caused a stir among Chinese media and net-citizens, many of whom thought she overestimated herself. Some Wuxia novelists and researchers also opposed her statement. Xin defended herself, "Revolution is no overthrow, but a means of showing deep reverence for Jin Yong." She claimed that she adored Jin Yong, and the adoration generated a sense of responsibility in her to surpass the orthodox Wuxia novels.
