= Jiang Hui =

19th-century author of star charts

- Born: 1839; Jiangjin, Chongqing
- Died: Unknown, after 1880; Unknown
- Spouse: Song Nan
- Father: Jiang Hanchun

Chinese name
- Chinese: 江蕙
Transcriptions
Standard Mandarin
- Hanyu Pinyin: Jiāng Huì
- Wade–Giles: Chiang^{1} Hui^{4}

Courtesy name
- Traditional Chinese: 次蘭
- Simplified Chinese: 次兰
Transcriptions
Standard Mandarin
- Hanyu Pinyin: Cìlán

Jiang Hui (Chinese: 江蕙, 1839–after 1880), courtesy name Cilan (次蘭), was a Chinese woman of the Qing dynasty who wrote a book of star charts based on an older work, whilst still a teenager.

== Life ==
Jiang Hui was a native of Jiangjin, Chongqing Prefecture, Sichuan Province. Her father Jiang Hanchun (江含春) was a writer and recluse who interested himself in alchemy, astronomy, and poetry. When she was nine years old, her father taught her the astronomical poem Song of the Sky Pacers which he also annotated in his book Lengyuan Xianshu (楞園仙書). He also taught her how to watch the positions of stars.

By the age of eleven or twelve Jiang Hui began to draw her own star chart based on her own observations. The older works she had possessed were no longer accurate. Titled the Tianwen Shan (天文扇, "Astronomical Fan"), her map was drawn on a hand fan. Her father wanted it published; but she refused.

In the early years of the Xianfeng era (1850–1861), Jiang Hanchun declined a government position, and by 1854 Jiang Hui was living in seclusion with her father at Longjingzhai. There she bought an anonymous astronomical treatise titled Zhongxing tu kao (中星圖考; "An Illustrated Treatise of the Transit-Stars"). She decided to update the book based on her own observations. She revised her work, titled Zhongxing tu zhu (中星圖著; "An Illustrated Work of the Transit-Stars"), over twelve times in more than a year. In her postscript, dated 1855 (when she was 16), she wrote of her wishes to hide the work from public view.

Jiang Hui was soon married to the scholar Song Nan (宋枏) from eastern Sichuan. She discontinued her astronomical pursuits thereafter. In 1874, Song Nan brought her book to a friend named Yao Jinyuan (姚覲元), who approved it and wrote an enthusiastic commentary which greatly aroused public interest. Her book was finally published in 1880, the year her husband received an official post in Baixia, Nanjing, Jiangsu. That year, she accompanied him to Beijing and met Luo Yunqiao (羅雲樵), who encouraged them to print it. It was published under the title Xinxiang ge kaoding ershisi qi zhongxing tu (心香閣考定二十四氣中星圖; "Map of Transit-Stars in the Twenty-four Solar Terms, Redacted by the Xinxiang Pavilion"), often shortened to either Ershisi qi zhongxing tu or Xinxiangge kaoding zhongxing tu. It was so titled because positions of stars during all 24 solar terms are clearly noted in the book. Her life after its publication is unknown.

== Reception of her work ==
As one of the few astronomical works by a Chinese woman, her book received considerable public interest. At least 15 contemporary men and two women wrote largely flattering commentaries or reviews, including her husband and many of his friends. Modern researchers have noted that none of them was an expert in astronomy.

Modern researchers have also noticed major mistakes in her work, especially when she identified the times of sunrises and sunsets during the different solar terms of the year. Jiang Hui's strength lay in identifying stars and their positions (although she most certainly did not identify every star herself); she did not realize the importance of hours in astronomy and she apparently was also limited by her lack of knowledge about astronomical calculations.
