= Fu Tianlin =

Chinese poet (born 1946)

Fu Tianlin (born 1946) is a Chinese poet. She was born in the Chinese province of Sichuan, where she still resides. In 1961, after graduating, she worked at an orchard in the countryside, while also working on her poems. In all she wrote ten poems and prose collections.
