= Bao Junhui =

Chinese poet

Bao Junhui (Chinese: 鮑君徽; fl.798 CE) (courtesy name Wenji) was a late eighth-century Chinese poet. She came from a respected family during the Tang dynasty and achieved fame as a poet during the reign of Emperor Dezong (779-804).

Bao Junhui was a daughter of Bao Zhengjun. She became a widow while young and, having no brothers, had only her mother. The quality of her poetry convinced the Emperor to summon her to the palace; a short time later, she had to leave the palace in order to care for her mother.

== Poetry ==
Bao Junhui and other talented women, such as the five Song sisters, were invited to reside in the palace as scholars who were held in great esteem. She, like many of the other respected poets who resided in the palace, was called upon to write poetry during special occasions, including banquets. She was considered to be as talented as the five Song sisters. The little known about Bao Junhui comes from a memorial she presented to the emperor asking for permission to leave the palace to care for her aged mother:

Your servant is a widow from a thatched hut who has nevertheless received Your Majesty’s ample grace, an honor that is more than I deserve. My only concern is that I am an only child and my father has passed away. In our courtyard there is no chicken or millet for meals, yet I have a white-haired mother at home to provide for… Now I am fortunate to be living at a time when a sage ruler has called me in to write poetry. I have been in a palace over one hundred days and during that time in order to bring joy to Your Majesty I have entertained you with my writing; I have also brandished my writing brush to exchange poems with your ministers. The only thing is, how can I be so neglectful a child as to leave my old mother by herself, uncared for? Whenever I think of this, my innards are tied in knots. I pray Your Majesty will open your gracious heart and heed your servant’s short letter and grant me permission to go in order to offer my mother the food of sweetness and nourishment. Thus, if my mother were to live only one day longer, it would be one day that your benevolence has bestowed upon her.

== Notable poems ==
Notable poems by Bao Junhui:

- "Tea Ceremony in the East Pavilion"
- "Sung Out in Sympathy for Flowers"
- "Moon at the Frontier Pass"
