= Four Books for Women =

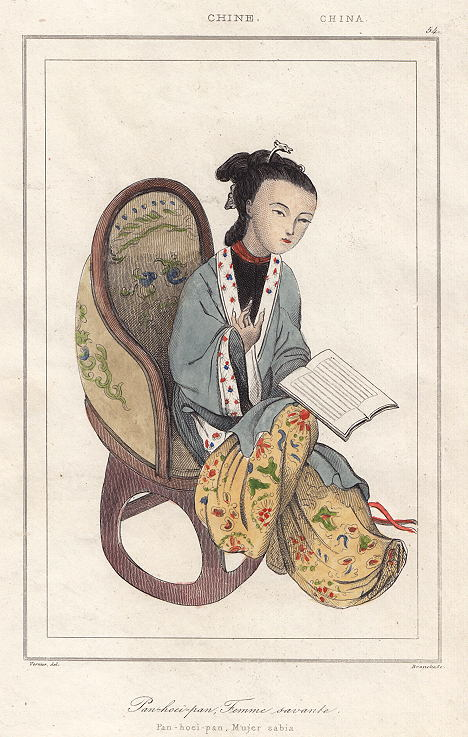
- Han scholar Ban Zhao was one of the authors of Four Books for Women.
- Chinese: 女四書
- Literal meaning: Women's Four Books
Transcriptions
Standard Mandarin
- Hanyu Pinyin: Nǚ sìshū
- Wade–Giles: Nü ssu-shu

The Four Books for Women (simplified Chinese: 女四书; traditional Chinese: 女四書) was a collection of material intended for use in the education of young Chinese women. In the late Ming and Qing dynasties, it was a standard text read by the daughters of aristocratic families. The four books had circulated separately and were combined by the publishing house Duowen Tang in 1624.

== Content ==
=== Overview ===
The four books are:

1. Lessons for Women (女誡; Nǚjiè) by Ban Zhao
2. Women's Analects (女論語; Nǚ lúnyǔ) by Song Ruoshen and Song Ruozhao
3. Domestic Lessons (内训; Nèixùn) by Empress Xu
4. Sketch of a Model for Women (女范捷录; Nüfan jielu) by Madame Liu

In Lessons for Women, Ban Zhou, China's foremost female scholar, expounds on general principles and philosophical points. In Women's Analects, the Songs illustrate these principles with practical examples relevant to everyday life. In Model for Women, Lady Liu retells the inspiring tales of various women in Chinese history. There are example of every kind of famous women from every period. Aside from Ban Zhao, there is also Liang Hongyu, who beat war drums in battle to encourage her husband, a Song dynasty general. Scholarship and sacrifice for nation and family are extolled.

=== Reverent submission ===
Ban Zhao's book was the most widely read of the four. She wrote that a woman should practice "reverent submission", respect for the three obediences and four virtues, and "set her husband on a par with Heaven". Ban Zhao compared marriage to the Dao, with the husband as the yin and the wife as the yang. This is a more romantic view of marriage than anything found in Confucius.

=== Women's education ===
Ban Zhao's life story was more inspiring than her writing. She was a Han dynasty scholar who not only tutored an empress, but also completed an official history begun by her brother. Reformers in the 16th and 17th centuries often cited her to make the case for women's education.

The Four Books explicitly argues for such education. "There were no wise and chaste women who were not created through education," as Domestic Lessons puts it. Regardless of content, the Four Books were designed to teach women to read, a controversial and progressive idea at the time. All four books were written by accomplished women, a point many editions underline by including biographical sketches and drawings of the authors in scholarly regalia.

The "Four Books" of the title alludes to the Four Books of Neo-Confucianism compiled by Zhu Xi. This was a textbook used by those studying for the Imperial Examinations. Women's learning is thus promoted as a realm on the same level as men's learning. "There is no doubt that women read both the Four Books for Women and the Four Books they were not supposed to read," according to modern scholar Dorothy Ko.
