= Cao Exiu =

Chinese actress and poet

Cao Exiu (fl. 1290), was a Chinese actress and poet.

She was famous in contemporary China for her ability as a Zaju actress, and was and referred to by Gao Andao as one of the elite artists of that profession. She was also a published poet, and was described as a witty beauty with an elegant behavior. Contemporaries respected her for her education within history and the classics, and several stories exist about her.
