= Zhu Lin (novelist) =

Chinese novelist

Zhu Lin (Chinese: 竹林; pinyin: Zhú Lín; born 1949), born as Wang Zuling (Chinese: 王祖铃), is a Chinese novelist.

== Life ==
Zhu Lin was the only child of parents who divorced when she was a baby. She did not have an easy childhood: she was brought up by her father, an academic, and a grandmother. Graduating from high school in 1968, she was rusticated to Fenyang County in Anhui Province, where she lived in primitive rural conditions. Blocked by her class background from attending university, she managed to return to Shanghai in 1975, working in a street factory before getting a job as an editor. She was editor at Shanghai Literature, until granted the status of professional writer in 1990. In 1980 she moved from Shanghai to Jiading in the suburbs, where she has continued to live.

== Works ==
=== Novels ===
- The Path of Life (Shenghuo de lu), 1979.
- Tempering Tree (Kulian Shu), 1985
- The Sobbing Langcang River (Wuye de Langcang Jiang), 1990.

=== Short story collections ===
- Heart Blossoms (Xin hua), 1983.
- Hell and Paradise (Diyu yu tiantang), 1984
- Snake Pillow Flowers (She zhentou hua), 1984

=== Children's books ===
- Night Pearl (Ye mingzhu), 1982
- Morning Fog (Chenwu), 1984
- The Curved Stone Bridge (Wanwan de shi gongqiao), 1987
