= Song Mingqiong =

Chinese poet (c1750–1802)

- Born: 1750 or 1752; Fengxin, Jiangxi
- Died: 1802 (age 49–52); Wenzhou, Zhejiang
- Spouse: Tu Jianxuan
- Children: 3, including two adopted
- Father: Song Wuren

Chinese name
- Traditional Chinese: 宋鳴瓊
- Simplified Chinese: 宋鸣琼
Transcriptions
Standard Mandarin
- Hanyu Pinyin: Sòng Míngqióng
- Wade–Giles: Sung^{4} Ming^{2}-ch'iung^{2}

Courtesy name
- Chinese: 婉仙
Transcriptions
Standard Mandarin
- Hanyu Pinyin: Wǎnxiān

Song Mingqiong (Chinese: 宋鳴瓊; 1750/52 – 1802), courtesy name Wanxian, was a Chinese poet of the Qing dynasty. She wrote thousands of poems during her lifetime, but perhaps only one-fifth of the poems have survived.

She was from Beixiang (北鄉), Fengxin, Jiangxi. The fifth of seven children of the scholar Song Wuren (宋五仁), she learned to read and write from her father and brothers. According to the local gazetteer (Fengxin xianzhi, 奉新縣志) she could read at the age of four, write poetry at the age of eight, and write fu prose-poems at the age of nine.

At the age of 14 she married Tu Jianxuan (涂建萱), also a native of Fengxin, and moved with him to Wenzhou when he took up an official position. Their marriage was cut short by his death seven years later. The next three decades saw her living out her life as a widow, bringing up a daughter and two adopted sons, and burying her parents and parents-in-law. Many of her days were spent reading poetry from her collection.

She often sent her poems to her siblings and their children, and it was through their connections that her poems enjoyed wide acclaim.

== Dream of the Red Chamber poems ==
She was one of the earliest women to write poems reflecting on her reading of the novel Dream of the Red Chamber. Evidence exists that she published the four poems in 1791, when the novel was still banned by the Qing government. In these poems, she criticized traditional marriages and expressed support for free love.

All four poems have been translated into English by Ellen Widmer.

== Bibliography ==
- Weixue xuan shicao (味雪軒詩草, "Poems from Weixue Pavilion", published in 1791)
- Biegao (別稿; "Supplement")
- Chunqiu waizhuan (春秋外傳; "Ancillary to the Spring and Autumn Annals")

Her other poems are found in anthologies compiled by Cai Dianqi (蔡殿齊) and Huang Zhimo (黃秩模).
