= Taoye Ferry =

Historical place name

- 桃叶渡
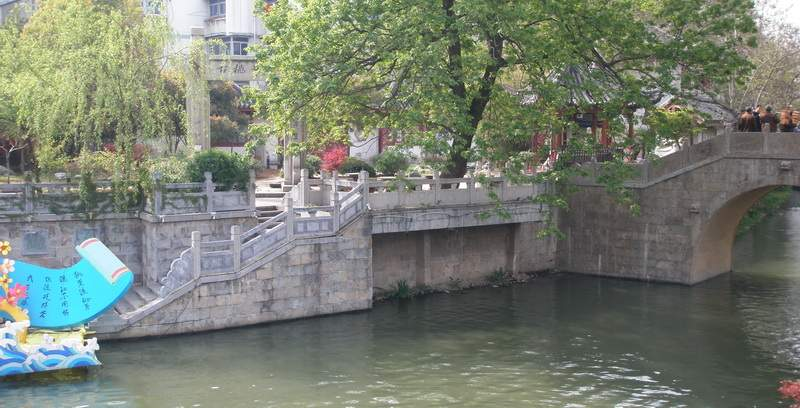

General information
- Location: No.43 Qinhuai Gongyuan Street, Nanjing, Jiangsu Province, China

Taoye Ferry (Chinese: 桃叶渡; pinyin: táo yè dù), also called Nanpu Ferry (Chinese: 南浦渡; pinyin: nán pǔ dù, is a historical place name in Nanjing, Jiangsu Province, China. Near the confluence of the Qinhuai River and ancient Qingxi River, the ancient ferry is now situated at the Lishe Bridge (利涉桥) which is to the east of the Jiangnan Examination Hall (江南贡院). The Huaiqing Bridge (淮清桥) lies to its north. Taoye Ferry stretches from Gongyuan East Street to the west of Huaiqing Bridge on Jiankang Road. During the Six Dynasties (229 A.D-589 A.D), it was renowned famous as a place where people said their farewells when leaving. Later it was included among the "48 Scenes of Jinling" (金陵四十八景).

== Origin of the place name ==
It is said that Wang Xianzhi, the seventh son of Wang Xizhi (a renowned calligrapher of the Eastern Jin Dynasty), often awaited his beloved concubine Taoye to be ferried at the crossing. At that time, the inner arm of the Qinhuai River was wide and the water was particularly deep and rushed rapidly at the Taoye Ferry. Therefore, boats would often capsize if the ferrymen were not cautious enough about the rough waves and fierce winds. Hence, Wang Xianzhi composed a “Song of Taoye” for his dear concubine to calm her and ease her fears when crossing the river. Therefore, the ferry crossing was named as "Taoye Ferry" in honor of Wang Xianzhi, who awaited his beloved at this site. The song of his goes like this:

O sweet Taoye, you are my love.
Cross the river straight and be not afraid.
Though the boat sails hastily without an oar,
I shall await here and assure you a safe return.

And Taoye sang a reply on the boat:

My face and the red blossoms reflect each other's glow,
And with grace they sway and gentleness I dance.
Though every girl has her fairness at time of youth,
I feel grateful as I am the apple in your eye.

Here are the three songs of Taoye by Wang Xianzhi:

(The first song)

O sweet Taoye, you are my love.
Cross the river straight and be not afraid.
Thought the boat sails hastily without an oar,
I shall await here and assure you a safe return.

(The second song)

My darling Taoye, thou art my love.
Taoye joint Taogen as we two are never alone.
I hold your heart dear, and mine you cannot miss;
May the pleasures I give you move thee.

(The third song)

My face and the red blossoms reflect each other's glow,
And with grace they sway and gentleness I dance.
Though every girl has her fairness at time of youth,
I feel grateful as I am the apple in your eye.

== History ==
For hundreds of years, there had been no bridge over the Taoye Ferry. It was not until the third year in the Shun Zhi Reign, 1646 that a bridge was built. In order to prevent further drownings, a man named Jin Yunpu in Xiaolingwei (孝陵卫) sponsored a wooden bridge. The governor Li Zhengmao greatly appreciated Jin's contribution and named it “Lishe Bridge”, which means that the bridge made it convenient for people to cross the ferry. Although the bridge is no longer extant, the street name of "Lishe" is still in use. Because of the bridge, the ferry structure gradually fell into disrepair during the Republican Era (民国时期).

A stele was erected at the original site of the ferry in 1984. Then, in 1987, a memorial arch as well as a pavilion were built north of Taoye Ferry. In 2003, the site was expanded into a heritage park which stretches from the east of Huaiqing Bridge to the Ping Jiangfu Road (平江府路), with a total area around 5000 m². The park's theme centers on the culture of the Six Dynasties and possesses a gallery of steles engraved with poems which are written by men of letters of past dynasties about the historical site. Some scenic spots which once were famous across the Nanjing city are also restored.
