= Xue Tao =

Chinese Tang Dynasty female artist and poet

- 薛濤
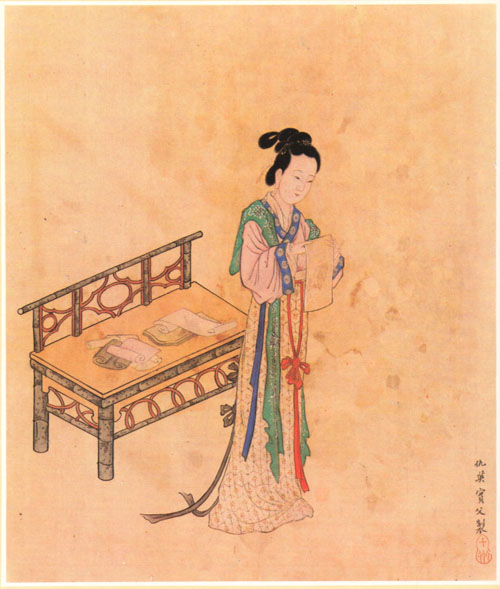
- Xue Tao's portrait by Qiu Ying
- Born: c. 770; Chang'an, Shaanxi Province
- Died: 832
- Other names: Hongdu; Female Jiaoshu
- Occupations: Courtesan, Poet, Qingke, Calligrapher,nun

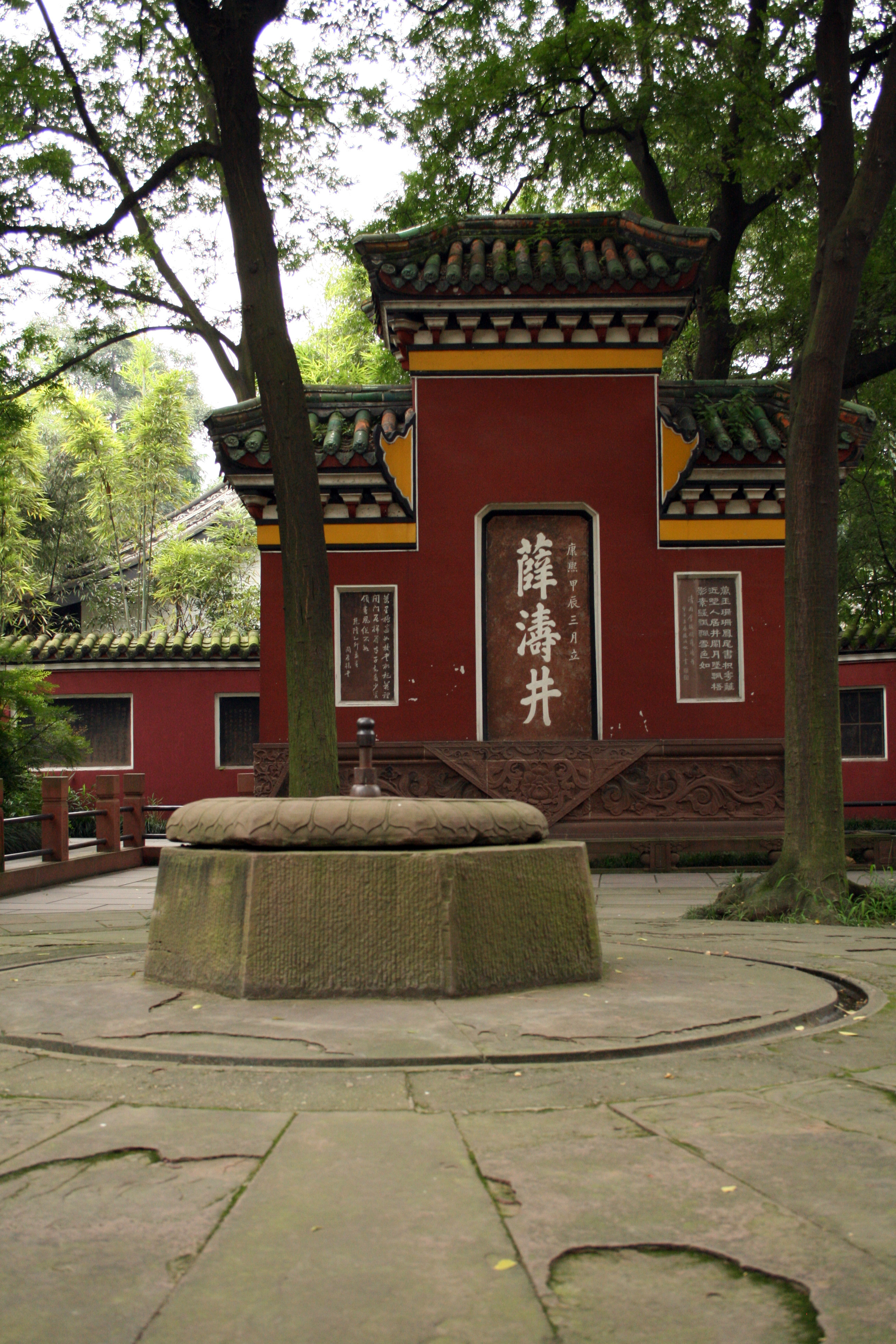
Xue Tao Well in Wangjianglou Park, Chengdu.

Xue Tao (simplified Chinese: 薛涛; traditional Chinese: 薛濤; pinyin: Xuē Tāo; Wade–Giles: Hsüeh Tʻao, c. 770–832), courtesy name Hongdu (洪度/宏度) was a courtesan and poet during the Tang dynasty. She was regarded as one of "the four great female poets of the Tang Dynasty" along with Yu Xuanji, Li Ye and Liu Caichun.

== Life ==
Xue Tao was born in Chang'an, the capital of the Tang Dynasty, and migrated with her parents to the State of Shu in her youth. The daughter of a minor government official named Xue Yun (薛郧), her father died while she was young.

After Xue Tao's father died, her mother became a widow, and they lived in poverty. Xue Tao was registered with the guild of courtesans and entertainers in Chengdu and in time became well known for her wit and her poetic talent.

Her poetry attracted the attention of Wei Gao, the military governor of Xichuan Circuit (西川, headquartered in modern Chengdu, Sichuan) and she was made his official hostess. In this position she met poets like Yuan Zhen, to whom she was said to have become close.

When Wu Yuanheng became governor in 807, she presented him with two poems. Wu was so impressed that he asked the Emperor to appoint Xue as an editor (jiaoshu) in his office. This was an unusual request as Xue Tao was both a woman and a government courtesan. Although Xue Tao was never given the position, she became known as the "female jiaoshu" or niijiaoshu (女校书). Later, "female jiaoshu" used to refer to a talented courtesan.

In later years, Xue was able to live independently in a site outside the city associated with the great poet of an earlier generation, Du Fu. Some sources record that she supported herself as a maker of artisanal paper used for writing poems. The letterheads made by Xue Tao also facilitate the timely storage of poetic inspiration. In the past, large letterheads were not easy to carry, but Xue Tao's letterheads were compact and could be taken anywhere and anytime. The letter paper made by Xue Tao was later called "Xue Tao Jian (薛涛笺)". In the middle and late Tang Dynasty, the letter paper she made was already an item on the desks of literati. By the Ming Dynasty, Xue Taojian's production technology was almost lost, and the annual output was very small. The King of Shu in the Ming Dynasty once used it as a tribute and handed it over to the Ming Dynasty court. Xue Tao was also a calligrapher, and her calligraphy inherited Wei Zhi (韦陟)'s "Wuyun (五云)" style running script in the prosperous Tang Dynasty. "Xuanhe Calligraphy (宣和书谱)" of the Northern Song Dynasty commented on Xue Tao's calligraphy, saying that her calligraphy was unfeminine and her writing was powerful. The beauty of her calligraphy is quite similar to that of Wang Xizhi. Xue Tao was the first female innovator in the history of Chinese calligraphy, she is also a female innovator in the history of Chinese papermaking. A contemporary wrote that she took on the garments of a Daoist adept, signaling a relatively autonomous status within Tang society.

Hsueh Tʻao, a Venusian crater, is named after her.

== Poems ==
Some 5000 poems by Xue were gathered in The Brocade River Collection that survived until the 14th century. Around 90 of her poems are still extant today, which is more than of any other Tang dynasty woman.

== Sources ==
- Appenzeller, Immo (2012). Transactions of the International Astronomical Union: Proceeding of the Twenty-Second General Assembly, The Hague 1994. Springer Science & Business Media. ISBN 9789400901636.
- Jia, Jinhua (2018). Gender, Power, and Talent: The Journey of Daoist Priestesses in Tang China. Columbia University Press. ISBN 9780231545495.
- Larsen, Jeanne (1983). The Chinese Poet Xue Tao: The Life and Works of a Mid-Tang Woman. (unpublished doctoral dissertation, University of Iowa)
- Larsen, Jeanne, translator (1987). Brocade River Poems: Selected Works of the Tang Dynasty Courtesan Xue Tao. Princeton University Press. (with introduction and notes)
- Larsen, Jeanne, translator (2005). Willow, Wine, Mirror, Moon: Women's Poems from Tang China. BOA Editions, Ltd. (contains translations of seven more poems by Xue, with notes)
- Lee, Lily Xiao Hong; Wiles, Sue (2014). Biographical Dictionary of Chinese Women: Tang Through Ming, 618-1644. M.E. Sharpe. ISBN 9780765643162.
- Ma, Maoyuan, "Xue Tao". Encyclopedia of China (Chinese Literature Edition), 1st ed.
- Yu, Lu (September 2010). Readings Of Chinese Poet Xue Tao (Thesis). University of Massachusetts Amherst. Archived from the original on 2019-01-17.
- "Xue Tao" from Other Women's voices, Translations of women's writing before 1700, last accessed June 4, 2007
