= Huang Chonggu =

Chinese poet (885–924)

- 黃崇嘏
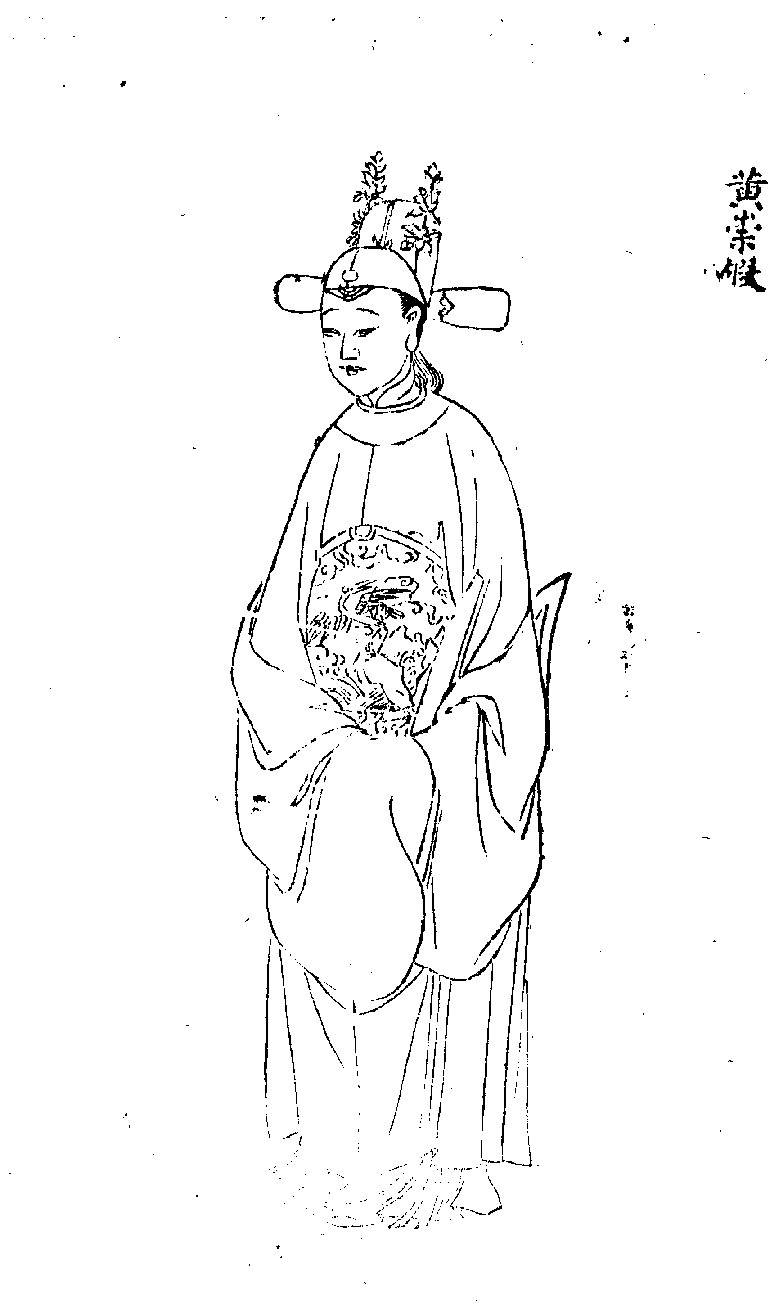
- A Qing dynasty illustration of Huang Chonggu
- Born: 885; Qionglai City, Tang Empire (now Qionglai City)
- Died: 924
- Occupation: poet
- Writing career
- Language: Chinese
- Period: Tang dynasty
- Notable work: 《辞蜀相妻女诗》
- Literary movement: Tang poetry

Chinese name
- Traditional Chinese: 黃崇嘏
- Simplified Chinese: 黄崇嘏
Transcriptions
Standard Mandarin
- Hanyu Pinyin: Huáng Chónggǔ

Huang Chonggu (Chinese: 黃崇嘏; pinyin: Huáng Chónggǔ, 885–924) was a Chinese civil servant and poet known for her academic skill, as well as for impersonating a man. Her backstory and poems have served as inspiration for a variety of historical and modern adaptations.

== Biography ==
Huang was born the daughter of a civil servant, but became an orphan at an early age, and was brought up by a maid. At a young age, she began to dress in the clothing of a man.

Around 915, she was arrested on suspicion of arson, and wrote a poem in her defense. Because of this, she was acquitted by the Prime Minister of the state of Shu, Zhou Xiang, who was impressed by the intelligence and talent exhibited in her defense.

Afterward, Zhou Xiang gave her a scholarship to study at a nearby university, and employed her after she had completed her education in the local administration. While there, she was described as a talented poet, a skilled chess player, and a capable official and administrator. Zhou Xiang was so impressed with her abilities that he offered one of his daughter's hands in marriage.

At this point, she was forced to reveal her biological sex, which she did by means of the poem 辞蜀相妻女诗 ( Chinese Wikisource has original text related to this article: 辭蜀相妻女詩), written in the Qijue style. Zhou Xiang saw her decision to live as a man as a sign of virtue, but the administration did not see this the same way, and she was fired.

== In popular culture ==
Huang Chonggu's story has attracted great interest, and has been depicted in literature many times throughout history.

The Ming dynasty artist and playwright Xu Wei wrote about Huang Chonggu's story in his play The Girl Graduate Rejects the Female Phoenix and Gains the Male Phoenix (simplified Chinese: 女状元辞凰得凤; traditional Chinese: 女狀元辭凰得鳳; pinyin: Nǚ zhuàngyuán cí huáng dé fèng)
