= Chen Jingrong =

Chinese poet and translator

- 陈敬容
- Born: September 2, 1917; Leshan, Sichuan, China
- Died: November 8, 1989 (aged 72); Beijing, China
- Education: Huabei University
- Occupations: Poet, translator
- Writing career
- Language: Chinese, French
- Period: 1937-1989
- Genre: Poem
- Notable work: Window

Chen Jingrong (simplified Chinese: 陈敬容; traditional Chinese: 陳敬容; pinyin: Chén Jìngróng; 2 September 1917 – 8 November 1989) was a Chinese poet and translator.

== Biography ==
Born in Leshan, Sichuan, she started publishing her first poetry in 1937. In 1938 she joined the All-China Anti-Japanese Association of Writers and Artists in Chengdu. During the war with Japan, she was part of the National Literary League of Resisting the Enemies. She moved to Lanzhou, Chongqing and then Shanghai. It was there when she became closely associated with the 'Nine leaves' poets.

In 1949 she entered Huabei University. After 1949, she started focusing on translating foreign poetry and was editor of World Literature. Many books of poems and prose have appeared. She retired in 1973.

== Works ==
=== Poetry ===
- Collection of Poems and Essays of Chen Jingrong (2008). 《陈敬容诗文集》 (in Chinese). Fudan University Press. ISBN 9787309061727.

=== Translations ===
- Victor Hugo (2015). 《巴黎圣母院》 [The Hunchback of Notre-Dame] (in Chinese). Translated by Chen Jingrong. Beijing: People's Literature Publishing House. ISBN 9787020104215.
