= Jin Yi (poet) =

Jin Yi (Chinese: 金逸, courtesy name Xianxian 纖纖; 1770–1794) was a Qing dynasty poet from Suzhou. Born into a local gentry family, she demonstrated remarkable talent at a very young age, and surpassed all her brothers when learning to compose poetry. Considered one of the most talented students of Yuan Mei, 108 of her poems were included in his anthology of works by his female students, the Suiyuan nüdizi shixuan. In his eulogy of Jin Yi, Yuan Mei wrote: "At a very early age she could already read books and distinguish the four tones. She loved to compose poetry, and every time she let fall her brush it was like a fleet horse prancing along unable to talk." A contemporary Qing poet, Wang Zhenyi, considered her to be an emblematic "banished immortal" (謫仙, zhexian), akin to Li Bai. Jin Yi's complete collection of poetic works in four volumes was titled Shouyinlou Shicao (瘦吟樓詩草, "Poetry Drafts from the Tower of the Slender Reciter").

Her poetic skills are said to have greatly pleased her husband, Chen Ji 陳基, on their wedding night; her "poetic companionship" was an important aspect of their marriage. An important theme in Jin Yi's poetry was chronic illness, which was the cause of Jin's early death at twenty-five. The languor and travail of illness became a major part of Jin's deliberate self-presentation to the world as a suffering, brilliant woman poet, an image popular at the time. Jin turned her literal illness into a metaphorical wasting at the hands of her passions, consciously giving greater meaning to her struggles with illness. She subverted traditional propriety with a degree of sensuality in her poems contemporarily considered "unbecoming" of a gentry wife.

On her deathbed, she wrote a poem on the novel Dream of the Red Chamber, identifying herself as a sort of real-life Lin Daiyu.

Some of her poetry has been translated into English.
