= Han Lanying =

Chinese scholar and writer

- Died: 493
- Occupation(s): Scholar and writer

Han Lanying (Chinese: 韓蘭英; pinyin: Hán Lányīng) was a Chinese scholar and writer who lived during the latter half of the 5th century. She was appointed to a position in the imperial court and retained that position despite a change in dynasties. None of her own work has survived; she is only known through references in various histories.

== Life ==
Han Lanying's family came from Wu Commandery (modern Suzhou in Jiangsu Province). The first records of her are tentatively dated about 454 and she died in 493. When she presented her work Rhapsody on the Restoration (Zhongxing fu) to the Emperor Xiaowu of Liu Song China before 464, he was impressed and gave her a position at court, although her exact role is unknown. His brother, Emperor Ming, retained her at court when he succeeded to the throne in 465, possibly as mistress of ceremony (siyi).

Han was also retained at court when the Southern Qi dynasty succeeded the Liu Song dynasty in 479. The Emperor Wu awarded her the title of Erudite (boshi) and requested that she teach the women of the palace. Han was mentioned by her full name in the official History of the Southern Qi Dynasty (Nan Qi shu), a significant honor for a common-born woman. Very little is known of her life and none of her works have survived to the present day.
