= Wu Zao =

Chinese poet (1799–1862)

Wu Zao (Chinese: 吳藻; 1799–1862) was a Chinese poet. She was also known as Wu Pinxiang (Chinese: 吳苹香) and Yucenzi (Chinese: 玉岑子).

== Background and career ==
The daughter of a merchant, she was born in the town of Renhe (now Hangzhou) in Zhejiang province. She married a merchant named Huang. Her contemporaries were wont to point out that her husband and father had "never even glanced at a book".

She was famous as a lyrics (ci) writer, in which she was considered one of the best of the Qing dynasty. She also wrote poetry in the sanqu form. She was said to be a good player of the qin, a stringed instrument. Wu wrote an opera (zaju) Yinjiu du Sao (Reading the "Li Sao" While Drinking), also known as Qiaoying (The Fake Image). Two collections of her works were published: Hualian ci (Flower curtain lyrics) and Xiangnan xuebei ci (Lyrics from South of the Fragrance and North of the Snows). She became a student of the poet Chen Wenshu. She was one of a number of early nineteenth-century women poets who wrote about the novel Dream of the Red Chamber.

Wu converted to Buddhism later in life.

== Translations ==
Several of her works have been translated into English, notably by Anthony Yu.
