= Li Ye (poet) =

Chinese Tang dynasty female poet

- Born: Wuxing, Huzhou, Zhejiang Province, China
- Died: 784
- Cause of death: Execution
- Other name: Li Jilan
- Occupations: musician, nun, poet

Li Ye (Chinese: 李冶; Wade–Giles: Li Yeh; died 784), also known by her courtesy name Li Jilan (Chinese: 李季蘭), was a Chinese musician, nun, and poet during the Tang dynasty. She was known for her poetic talent as well as her beauty. In the tumultuous years of the late Tang, she was accused of treason for poems denigrating the imperial house of Tang that the rebel leader Zhu Ci forced her to write. She was condemned to death and executed in 784. Li is one of the few Tang-dynasty women whose poetry has survived.

== Life ==
Li Ye was born in Wuxing, in present-day Huzhou, Zhejiang Province. As a child, she enjoyed writing poetry and was described by her father as "exceptionally clever" when she was six, after he read a poem she had written. However, he worried that she would grow up to become an "unchaste woman." Li's father was encouraging of her literary promise and believed that her talent would be wasted on marriage.

Li Ye was particularly known for her "beauty and grace," as well as her talents for poetry, music, and calligraphy. She was well known in literary circles and associated with famous poets such as Liu Zhangqing, Jiaoran and Lu Yu, and her writing was praised by her contemporaries. She also had a reputation for being an "unchaste" woman. Her friend Jiaoran, the renowned poet and Buddhist monk, composed a poem after she paid him a visit: "A celestial fairy came to test me, / With the intention of spreading her blossoms onto my clothes."

In her middle age, Li was recognized as a poet laureate by Emperor Daizong of Tang, who summoned her to the court after learning of her literary talent. She stayed in the palace for about a month, where she was treated lavishly by the emperor. However, she preferred her former carefree life and was allowed to return home.

In 783, rebel leader Zhu Ci captured Chang'an, the capital of China and seated himself on the throne. Li was forced to write poems denigrating the imperial house of Tang. Zhu was defeated the following year, and Emperor Dezong, Daizong's successor, returned to Chang'an. Dezong accused Li of treason for her anti-Tang poetry. She was condemned to death and executed in 784.

Li Ye did not act as a courtesan or prostitute in society, but because of her personal lifestyle, she was often denounced by later generations, and later dynasties even denigrated her as "half a prostitute". During the heyday of the Tang dynasty, relations between men and women were more open than in later times, Li Ye's actions were only somewhat avant-garde.

== Legacy ==
The Qing dynasty anthology Complete Tang Poems, together with its supplements, preserves 18 of Li Ye's poems. Her poetry was praised by the editors of the Qing-era Complete Library of the Four Treasuries:

Li Ye excelled at pentasyllabic shi poetry ... If her poems were mixed with the corpus of the Ten Talented Poets of the dali reign period, no one would be able to tell the difference. Her style is much better than that of Xue Tao; therefore her work should not be abandoned merely because of the small number of her extant poems.

Yu Jiaxi, a modern critic, wrote about Li condemning her execution:

During Zhu's revolt, not even the emperor himself could guard his empire but had to abandon his subjects and consorts. Li Ye was even more powerless, criticizing the Tang simply because she was hectored by the despotic rebels. Emperor Dezong made no allowance for the difficulty she found herself in and had her executed.

== See also ==
- Xue Tao
- Yu Xuanji
