= Hong Ying =

Chinese writer

- 虹影
- Born: September 21, 1962 (age 63); Chongqing, China
- Education: Lu Xun Literary Institute; Fudan University
- Occupations: Novelist, poet
- Spouse: Zhao Yiheng (m. 1991; div. 2003)
- Children: 1
- Writing career
- Language: Chinese
- Period: 1981–present
- Genres: Poem, novel

Hong Ying (Chinese: 虹影; pinyin: Hóng Yǐng; born September 21, 1962) is a Chinese author known for her novels.

== Biography ==
Hong was born in Chongqing on September 21, 1962, towards the end of the Great Leap Forward. She began to write at eighteen, leaving home shortly afterwards to spend the next ten years moving around China, exploring her voice as a writer via poems and short stories. After brief periods of study at the Lu Xun Academy in Beijing and Shanghai's Fudan University, Hong Ying moved to London in 1991 where she settled as a writer. She returned to Beijing in 2000.

== Work ==
She is best known in English for the novels K: the Art of Love, Summer of Betrayal, Peacock Cries, and her autobiography Daughter of the River. Hong Ying's work has been published in twenty languages and has appeared on the bestseller lists of numerous countries. She won the Prize of Rome for K: the Art of Love in 2005 and many of her books have been or are now in the process of being turned into television series and films.

Hong Ying has long been interested in stories of homosexuals living in China, a theme explored in her short story collection, A Lipstick Called Red Pepper: Fiction About Gay and Lesbian Love in China 1993–1998. In her work, she likes to focus on human stories, hardship and history. Her responsibility as a writer, she believes, is in part to explore the lives of marginalised groups struggling for visibility – and for compassion – in contemporary China.

In recent years, Hong Ying has written a number of books for children: Mimidola: the River Child; The Girl from the French Fort; The Legend of Liya; New Moon Rise.

== Personal life ==
Hong Ying is married to Adam Williams, born 1953, a banker and businessman turned writer. Williams is a fourth generation Briton, born to a family with colonial ties to the Far East. They have been married since 2009 and have a daughter, Sybil. They live in London and Marche, Italy.

== Novels ==
- Far Goes the Girl (1994) 《女子有行》
  - Taiwan: Erya Press 1996; Mainland China: Jiangsu Literary Press 1997
- Summer of Betrayal (1995)
  - Meulenhoff, Holland, 1997; Tiden Norsk, Norway, 1997; De Seuil, France, 1997; Bloomsbury, UK, 1997; Farrar Straus & Giroux, US, 1997; Krueger, Germany, 1997 (paperback by Aufbau 2004); Mondadori, Italy, 1997; Aoyama, Japan, 1998; Plaza & Janes, Spain, 1998; Gyldendal, Denmark, 1998; Norstedts, Sweden, 1998; Livros do Brasil, Portugal, 2001
- Daughter of the River (1997)《饥饿的女儿》(in Chinese, literally: Daughter of Hunger)
  - Taiwan: Erya Press, 1997; Mainland China: Sichuan Literary Press, 1999 (Relaunched by Lijiang Press 2001, Relaunched by Zhishi Press, 2003); Meulenhoff, Holland, 1998; Bloomsbury, UK, 1998; Mondadori, Italy, 1998; Allen & Unwin, Australia, 1998; Grove/Atlantic, US 1999; Norstedts, Sweden, 1999; Tiden Norsk, Norway, 1999; De Sueil, France, 1999; Kinneret, Israel, 2001; Politik Forlag, Denmark, 2001; Otava, Finland, 2001; Govostis, Greece, 2002; Hangilsa, South Korea; Shuei-Sha, Japan; Bertelsmann Media, Poland; Aufbau, Germany; Planeta, Spain
- A Lipstick Called Red Pepper: Stories and Novellas (1993–1998)
  - Edition Cathey, Bochum University Press, 1999
- K (1999) 《K》
  - Taiwan, Erya Press, 1999; Mainland China, Huashan Press, 2001 (Relaunched by Spring Breeze Press, 2003); Meulenhoff, Holland, 2000; Norstedts, Sweden 2001; Marion Boyars, UK & US, 2002 (Paperback bought by Transworld); De Seuil, France, 2003; Hangilsa, South Korea; Aufbau, Germany, 2004; Metaichimo, Greece; Garzanti Libri, Italy; Metaixmio, Greece; Grup 62, Spain; Pluto, Slovenia; Kineret, Israel; JLX Publishers, Hungary; Kasander Film Company signed Film Option, December 2003
- Ananda (2001) 《阿难》
  - Mainland China: Hunan Literary Press, 2001 (Relaunched by Zhishi Press 2003); Taiwan: Unitas Press, 2002
- The Peacock Cries (2002) 《孔雀的叫喊》
  - Mainland China: Zhishi Publishing House 2003; Taiwan: Unitas Publishing House 2003; English: Marion Boyars, 2004; Germany: Aufbau
- Lord of Shanghai (2003)
  - Mainland China: Changjiang Literary Publishing House, 2003; Taiwan: Nine Songs Publishing House, 2003; Film adaptation purchased by Sherwood Hu, 2003; TV adaptation right purchased by Tongdao Film Company, 2003; Germany: Aufbau; South Korea: Hangilsa
- The Green Platye (2004)
  - Mainland China: Shanghai Literary Press, 2004; Taiwan: Nine Songs Press, 2004
- Death in Shanghai (2005)
  - Taiwan: Nine Songs Press, 2005; Mainland China: Shandong Publishing House, March 2005; Hairun Film Company signed film/TV double contract, March 2005; South Korea: Hangilsa
- "Good Children of the Flower" (2016) 《好儿女花》; Ajatus Kirjat, Finland, 2010;
