= Po-Ying Li =

Chinese actress and Cantonese opera performer from Hong Kong

- Chinese: 李寶瑩
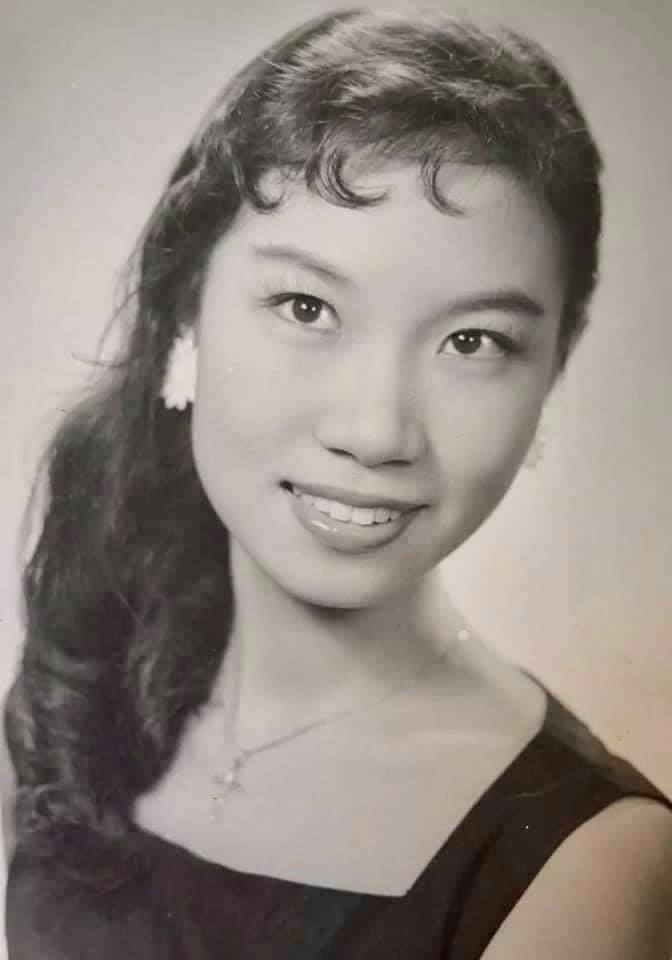
- Li in the 1960s
- Other names: Bo-Ying Lee, Lee Bo-Ying, Lee Bo Ying, Lee Po-Ying, Li Baoying, New Fong Yim-Fan
- Education: St. Francis' Canossian College
- Occupations: Actress; Cantonese opera singer
- Years active: Since before 1954 to early 1989
- Known for: Bo-style
- Musical career
- Genres: Cantonese opera
- Instrument: Voice
- Formerly of: Reckeners Cantonese Opera Troupe; Da Qun Ying Yue Ju Tuan (Chinese: 大羣英粤劇團)

Po-Ying Li (Chinese: 李寶瑩) is a former Chinese actress and Cantonese opera singer from Hong Kong. Li is credited with over 45 films.

== Early life ==
Li’s ancestral hometown is Daliang Subdistrict, Shunde District, Foshan, Guangdong province. Li started singing because her father took her to a training class of the South China Athletic Association. She has one sister and two brothers. Her father died during her months of overseas performance at intermission of her first film.

== Career ==
Li started her career as a Cantonese opera singer on radio and her vocal style eventually became known as the Bo-style.

Li became an actress in Hong Kong films first in It's Fun Getting Together, a 1954 comedy directed by Chow Sze-Luk. Li appeared in White Gold Dragon (1954), Third-master Sha, the Heart-Stealer (1954), and How the Scholar Tong Pak-Fu Won the Maid Chau-Heung (1954). Li appeared as a lead actress in The Scholar Whose Ambition Is to Marry a Princess, a 1955 Cantonese opera film directed by Wong Tin-Lam, and in The Opera Boat at Star Island (aka The Opera Boat in Singapore), a 1955 Drama film directed by Ku Wen-Chung. Li also appeared as Princess Iron Fan in The Adventures of Nazha, a 1965 Historical Drama directed by Siu Sang and Miu Hong-Nee. Li's last film was Night of the Opera Stars (aka Goddess of Mercy Celebrates Her Birthday at Xiang Shan), a 1966 Documentary film directed by Wong Hok-Sing. Li is credited with over 45 films.

== Repertoire ==
Li earned her the nickname the Mini-Yim Fun Fong through vocal performances, live on radio as well as albums with Mee Shing (Record) Co. Hong Kong. On stage opposite different co-leads, her choices had been either new debuts or selected from Fong's Repertoire. The female lead had the title role in most of her picks after a new Troupe was created for her stage performances right before Fong retired. She never played second to or even more junior roles with any female leads on stage.

1. The Butterfly Lovers opposite Lam Kar Sing (two versions, quit her career within months and 80 performances overall opposite Lam since the debut of second version)
2. The Immortal Zhang Yuqiao, the Most Respectable Courtesan (with blessing of Yim Fun Fong)
3. How Prince Xinling Stole the General's Seal to Save the State of Zhao (only opposite Ho Fei-Fan), film version released 30 May 1957 in Hong Kong
4. Zheng Cheng-Gong (only opposite Ho Fei-Fan as original cast)
5. Willow Beauty by playwright So Yung (Chinese: 蘇翁) (opened in 1973)
6. San Kan Yu Mei Liu Jinding (Chinese: 三看御妹劉金定)
7. The Story of Li Wa (Chinese: 李娃傳)
8. Martial Heros
9. Lovers Destiny (Chinese: 新啼笑因緣) opposite Tang Bik-wan
10. Injustice Done to Tou Ngo
11. Beauty Fades from Twelve Ladies' Tower
12. Goddess of the Luo River
13. The Dream Encounter Between Emperor Wu of Han and Lady Wa
14. Story of Wang Bao Chuan
15. A Buddhist Recluse for 14 Years
16. An Order to Annihilate Dragon Mountain by playwright So Yung
17. The Royal Decree of Exemption from Death by So Yung (蘇翁)
18. Forty Years of Cherished Love+
19. Romance of Liu Yi (柳毅傳書)+

+ Exceptions to the trend of eponymous roles, made out of respect for the senior male lead upon his return to performing in Hong Kong. On the same occasion, they put Immortal Zhang Yuqiao, the Most Respectable Courtesan back on stage, first time ever since Fong.

== Theater performance ==
- Veteran organizer (Chinese: 成多娜) created a new test troupe for her stage performances right before Fong retired opposite two young up-and-coming co-leads, similar to the style of Fong who hired different, albeit veteran, male co-leads as and when Fong saw fit.
- Li never played second to any female leads or even more junior roles on stage.
- Neither was Li the original cast of her Repertoire until, years since debut on stage in the very late 1950s, opposite Ho Fei-Fan and others who had decades of experience working with such brand new female co-leads.
- 1977, with Da Qun Ying Yue Ju Tuan, Kreta Ayer People's Theatre, Singapore
- 1978, 6th Hong Kong Arts Festival

- Butterfly Lovers
- War and Never-ending Love by playwright Poon Cheuk

- 1979, The Love Story of the Carp
- 1981, one title for 8 shows on 7 days, Hong Kong
- 1983, Chinese Opera Fortnight
- 1984, four titles/shows on three days in Paris, France

- San Kan Yu Mei Liu Jinding
- Lady White Snake
- Goddess of the Luo River
- The Dream Encounter Between Emperor Wu of Han and Lady Wa

- 1985, Chinese Opera Fortnight

== Filmography ==
=== Films ===
This is a partial list of films.

- 1954 It's Fun Getting Together
- 1954 White Gold Dragon
- 1954 Third-master Sha, the Heart-Stealer
- 1954 How the Scholar Tong Pak-Fu Won the Maid Chau-Heung
- 1955 The Scholar Whose Ambition Is to Marry a Princess
- 1955 The Opera Boat at Star Island (aka The Opera Boat in Singapore)
- 1960 The Revenge of a Forlorn Wife
- 1960 Ten Schoolgirls - Lam Doi-Yuk Choi Ping-Kei
- 1962 The Jade Hairpin (opposite Ho Fei-Fan)
- 1962 The Royal Wedding in the Palace (as Xi Shi)
- 1965 The Adventures of Nazha – Princess Iron Fan
- 1966 Night of the Opera Stars (aka Goddess of Mercy Celebrates Her Birthday at Xiang Shan) – Documentary

== Discography ==
- 1954, Lotus Fragrance (Chinese: 荷花香,美聲), S-113, (Shellac, 10"), one side
- 1959, Two Fools in Hell (LTLP-16)
- 1960, Lotus Fragrance (Chinese: 荷花香,美聲), M4536
- 1965, Gung Hei Faat Coi (Chinese: 恭喜發財,美聲), S507
- 1968, Family Affair (CLT-12-5 or CKL-5128)
- 1968, Of Love and Enmity
- 1968, Wu Shuang Story (Chinese: 無雙傳, TSLP 2062)
- 1969, Why Not Return? (2xLP, Gat)
- 1969, Lam Chung
- 1970, Huan Chang San Guai (Chinese: 歡場三怪, CST-12-1001)
- 1970, Drums Along the Battlefield (LP, Album)
- 1971, The Revenge Battle
- Meeting at the Pavilion (aka Butterfly Lovers)

- one version with Yam Kim-fai (CSLP1005, First released in 1968)
- one version with Lam Kar Sing

- Lady White Snake
- Young's Female Warrior
- Chai Tou Feng (Chinese: 釵頭鳳, aka Forty Years of Cherished Love)
- Di Qing's Night of Three Hurdles (aka Shuangyang Princess Chasing The Runaway Husband, TSLP 2063)
- 1981, Qing Gong Yuan (Chinese: 清宮怨) with Xiaofeng Chen and others

=== Solo ===
- Don't Forget Your Heartfelt Friends (FHLP 541, 1974)

== Awards ==
- 1981 BH for her artistic contributions towards Cantonese Opera.
