= Song poetry =

Poetry typical of the Song dynasty of China

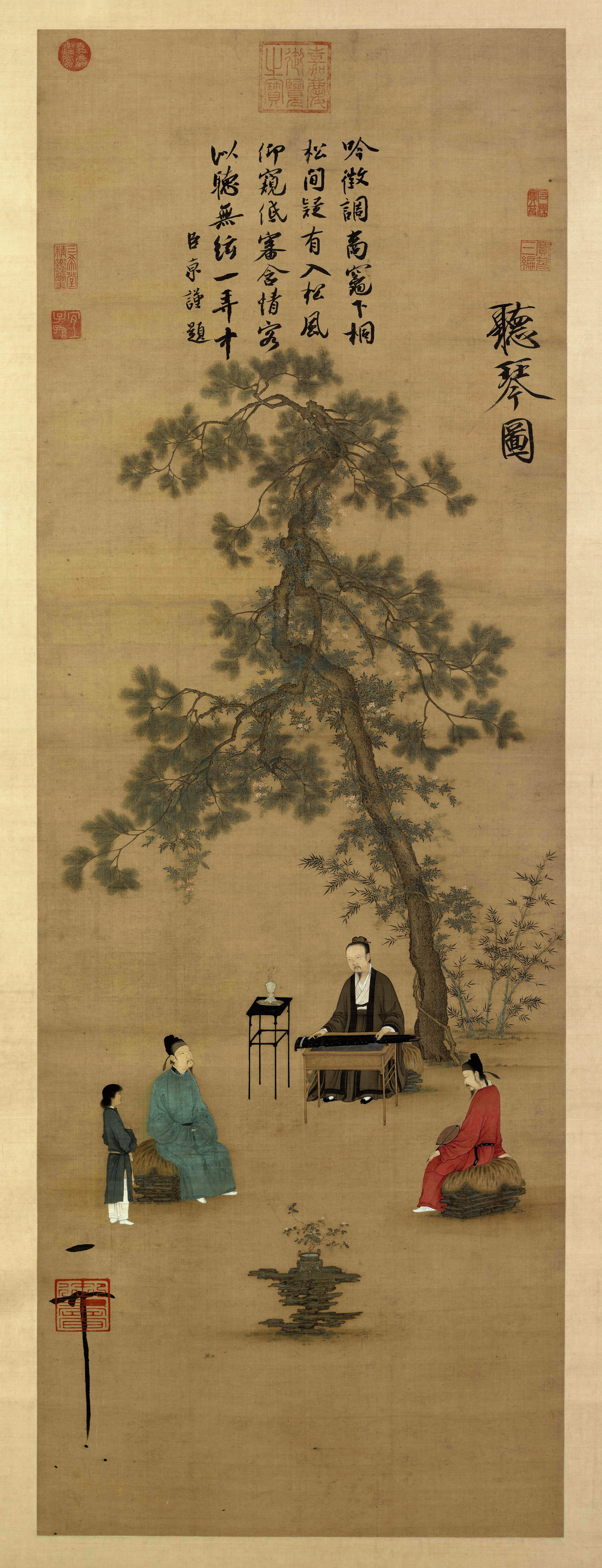
Song Huizong's "Listening to the Qin"

Song poetry is poetry associated with the Song dynasty of China, established by the Zhao family in China in 960 and lasted until 1279.

Many of the best known Classical Chinese poems, popular also in translation, are from the Song dynasty poets, such as Su Shi (Dongpo), Ouyang Xiu, Lu You and Yang Wanli; in total, there are over 250,000 extant shi poems by 9,200 poets from the Song dynasty, bringing the scale of Chinese poetry to an unprecedented height. In addition to shi poetry, one of the other major poetic forms during the Song was ci, and there are over 21,000 extant ci poems by 1,330 Song dynasty ci poets in the anthology Quan Song ci (全宋詞).

"Shi" poetry, together with "ci", and "prose" (the anthology Quan Song Wen includes more than 170,000 prose works from the Song dynasty), were three dominant literary forms during the Song. This was also a time of great achievement in painting and literature, and many artists were accomplished in more than one of these fields while simultaneously holding government positions.

== Historical background ==
The Song dynasty (960–1279) was the first time that China was unified into one state since the Tang dynasty, the two dynasties were separated from each other by the Tang-Song transition period, known as the Five Dynasties and Ten Kingdoms period, a period of disunity. The Song period is divided into two parts. The first was the Northern Song (960–1127) which consisted of the China as reunified by the dynastic founder Emperor Taizu of Song. The second part is the Southern Song (1127–1279) because the northern part of the empire was ceded to the military forces of the Jurchens, who formed their own Jin dynasty (1115–1234) out of former Song imperial territory. The Southern Song then faced a protracted struggle against the Mongol Empire before finally succumbing to the Mongol forces, who then established themselves as the Chinese Yuan dynasty. Despite the constant military pressure and numerous foreign affairs challenges, the Song dynasty saw growing population, economical prosperity, and excellence in the fine arts.

== The poetic tradition ==
The poets of the Song dynasty drew on a long tradition of poetry in China, particularly upon forms prevalent in the Tang dynasty. The ci form is especially associated with the Song dynasty period shows signs of development toward the end of the Tang dynasty and the period of disunity immediately before the Song dynasty, especially as exemplified in the works of Li Yu of the Southern Tang dynasty. One of the new developments was a large increase in the popularity of the ci form of poetry, a form based on the traditional forms and rhythms, ultimately drawn from popular songs, but with new words. The ci form also saw some influences from Central Asia, and were popularized outside of mainstream scholarly culture, and some of them were indigenous Chinese folk developments, developed in the streets and the pleasure houses. The ci form centered around providing new lyrics to existing tunes. Another development was an increasing fusion of painting and poetry, such as in the various Eight Views of the Xiao Xiang series of matched paintings and poems. Many of the Song dynasty poets were greatly affected by the politics of the time.

== Poetry and politics ==
During the Northern Song many of the government officials/poets were caught up on one side or the other over the controversial reformism of the powerful government minister Wang Anshi. One of those affected by his opposition to Wang Anshi's policies was Su Shi, who got his nickname "Dongpo" from his place of banishment during his first period of exile, in which his poems were used against him as evidence of disloyalty to the empire, in what has been known as the Crow Terrace Poetry Trial. Su Shi's poetry also was much affected by his second period of banishment to what was then an extremely remote imperial outpost on the far southern island of Hainan. During the Southern Song, much of the political controversy was waged around the issue of the status of the occupied northern part of the empire, which had been lost in the Jurchen invasion. Lu You was one of the poets who considered reconquering the north his patriotic duty and wrote poems in this regard.

== Poets ==
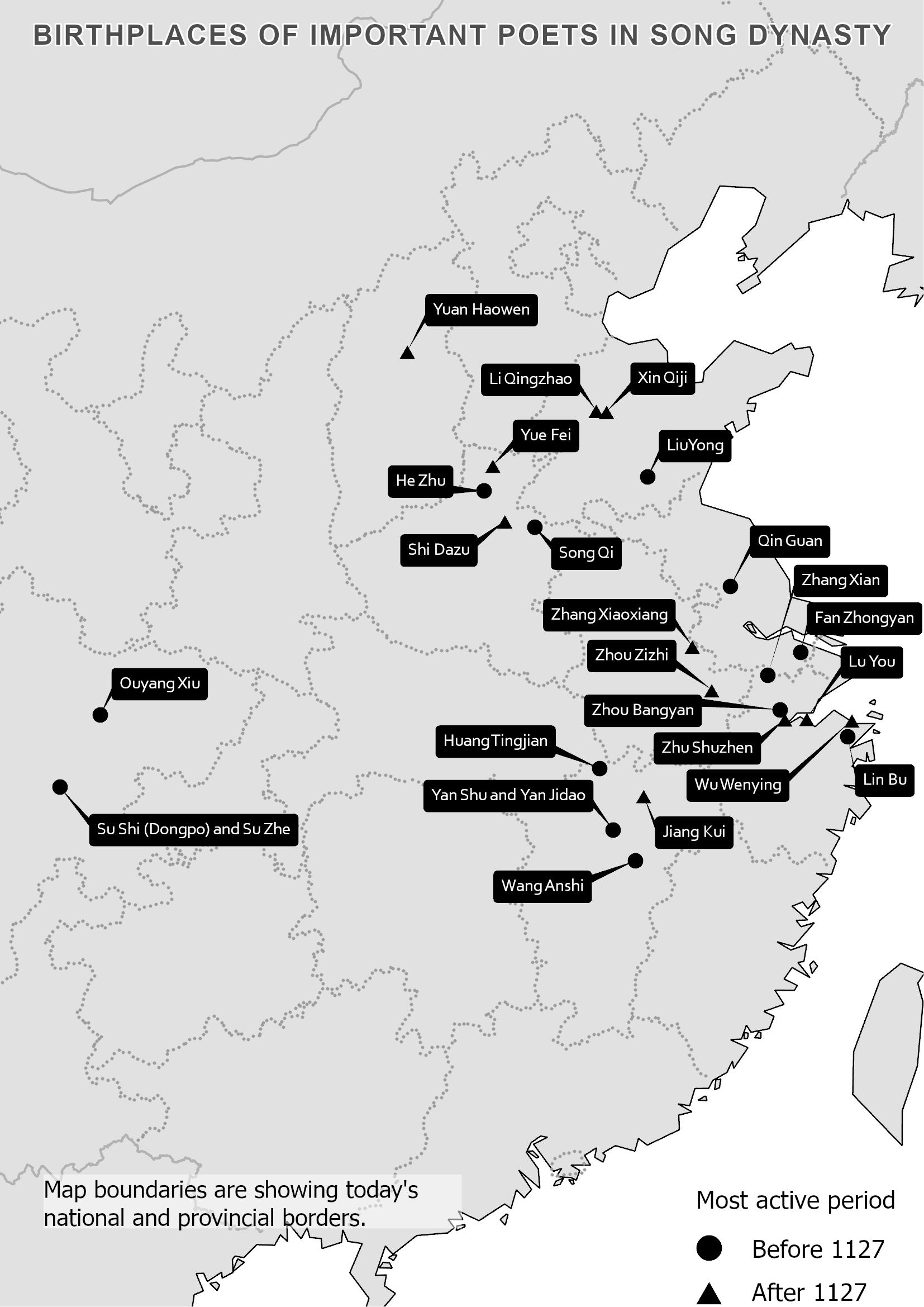
Distribution of birthplaces of important Song dynasty poets (including Ci poets)

Famous Song dynasty poets include Cai Xiang, Chao Chongzhi, Fan Chengda, Fan Zhongyan, Emperor Huizong of Song, Gong Kai, Han Shizhong, Lady Huarui, Jiang Kui, Li Houzhu, Li Qingzhao, Lin Bu, Liu Kezhuang, Lu You, Mei Yaochen, Mi Fu, Ouyang Xiu, Qian Chu, Qin Guan, Shao Yong, Shen Kuo, Song Qi, Su Shi, Su Zhe, Wang Anshi, Wang Yucheng, Wen Tianxiang, Wen Tong, Xin Qiji, Yan Yu, Yang Wanli, Yue Fei, Zeng Gong, Zhang Xian, Zhu Shuzhen, and Zhu Xi.

== Poetry, painting, and calligraphy ==
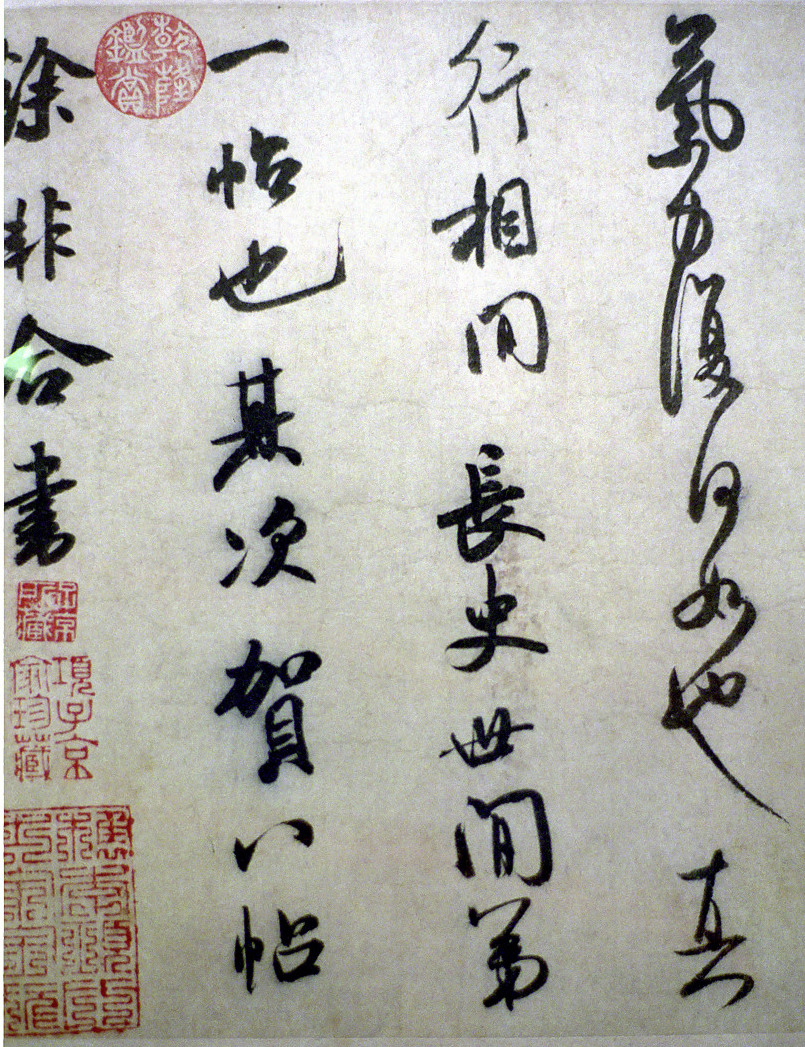
Mi Fu, calligraphy detail

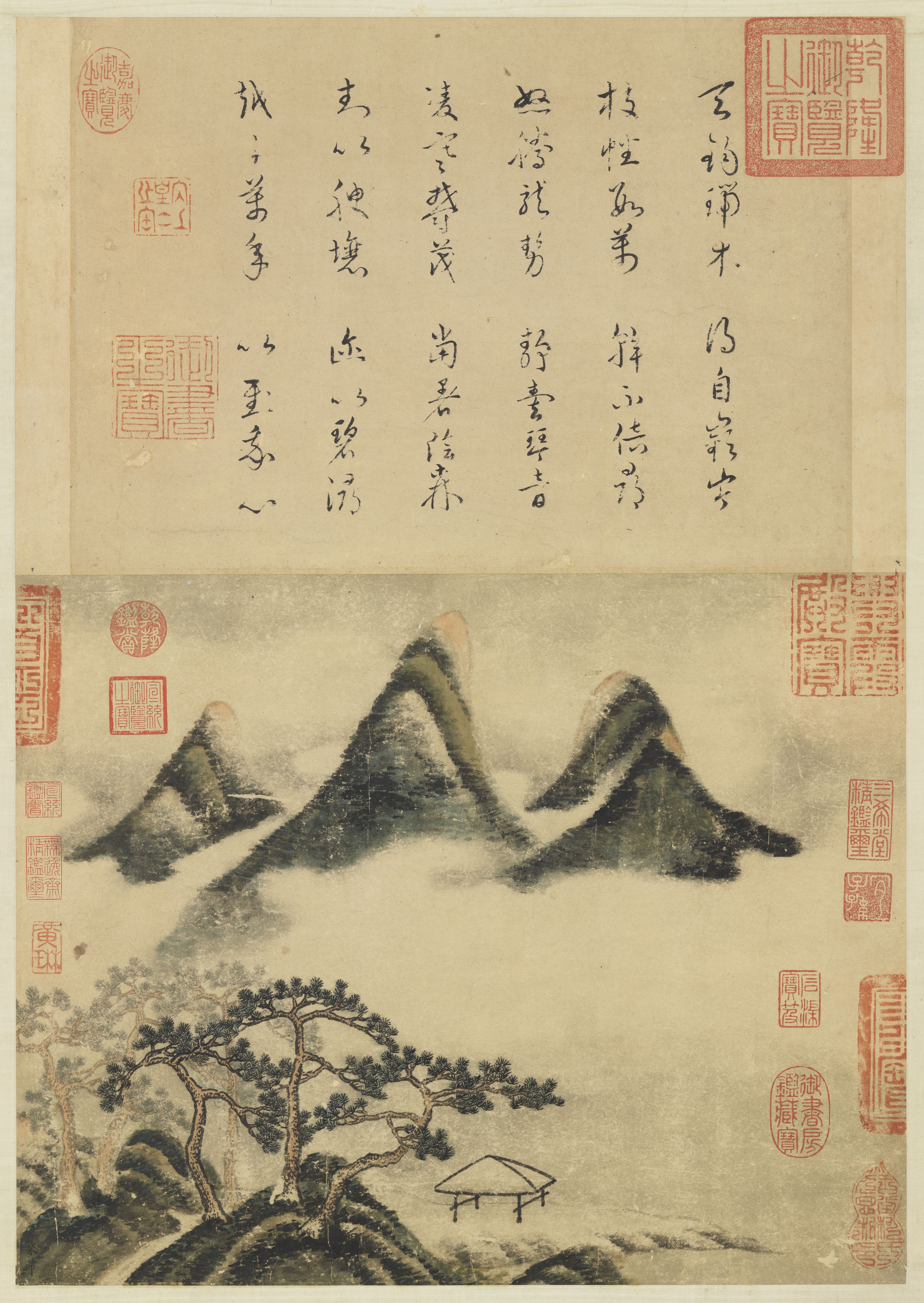
Mi Fu, c. 1100, Indian ink and color on paper

The Song dynasty is known for its achievements in terms of combining poetry, painting, and calligraphy, called the three perfections, into a shared art form, or as complementary activities. Scroll paintings often included accompanying calligraphy poems on the same page which expanded on the themes of the visual artwork. One renowned practitioner of this combination of talents was Mi Fu (also known as Mei Fu). This practice was perhaps more of a rule then an exception for the Song dynasty poets. Involvement in the writing of prose works was also not uncommon for the Song dynasty poets; Song Qi and Ouyang Xiu collaborated on the now classic history of the Tang Empire New Book of Tang.

== The Ci form ==
The Ci as a poetic form perhaps reached a high point during the Song dynasty. The ci is a kind of lyric Classical Chinese poetry using a poetic meter based upon some 800 prototypical fixed-rhythm forms, originally tunes of songs, each having a traditional title. Each song title therefore came to specify particular fixed pattern of tone, rhythm, number of syllables (or characters) per line and the number of lines. Therefore, it is common for several ci to share the same title, which often has little or nothing to do with the topics of those poems, but rather the patterns that the lyrics follow. Many of its prime proponents were female poets, such as Li Qingzhao. Su Shi was another prominent Song poet famous for writing in the ci form.

== Xiaoxiang: poems of exile ==
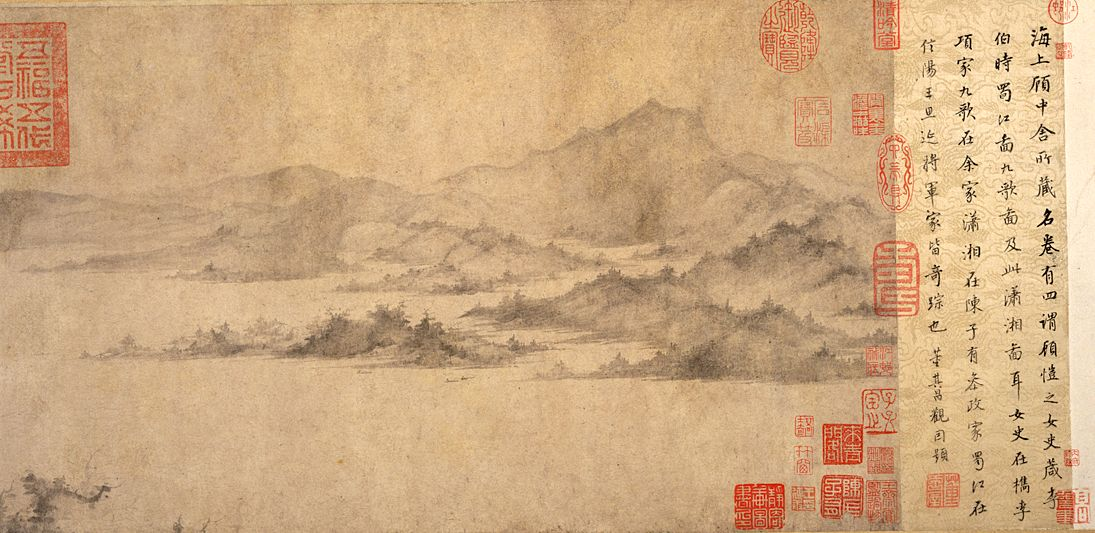
Part of the imaginary tour through Xiao-xiang by Li from the 12th century. Scroll, 30.3 cm x 400.4 cm. Ink on paper. Located at Tokyo National Museum, Tokyo.

As in Tang times, many were the poems written by poets, who found, then lost, or never received the high paying and socially prestigious governmental positions that they desired or expected from the imperial court for their perceived abilities, talents, or application thereof: verified through the civil service examinations, actual political management services, or personal perception. Although service to the imperial court (and to the people which it theoretically represented) was a general societal ideal and frequent personal ideal, the arbitrary nature of the imperial power system, its censorial powers, and the vicissitudes of the historical process resulted in a poetic tradition of a strong but subtle dissent. The Xiaoxiang genre of poetry dates back at least to the third century BCE. It continued to develop to new levels of subtle expressions of discontent through the Song dynasty era.

== See also ==
- Classical Chinese poetry, a general discussion of Classical Chinese poetry
- Ci (poetry), an article on the ci poetry especially associated with the Song dynasty
- Chinese poetry
- Dongting Lake
- Eight Views of Xiaoxiang
- Guqin
- Tang poetry
- Xiaoxiang poetry
