= Endless Longing =

Chinese ci poetry tune pattern

Changxiangsi
- Traditional Chinese: 長相思
- Simplified Chinese: 长相思
- Literal meaning: Endless longing
Transcriptions
Standard Mandarin
- Hanyu Pinyin: Cháng xiāngsī

Endless Longing (Chinese: 長相思, Pinyin: Cháng xiāngsī), also known as Shuang Hongdou (雙紅豆; "Double Red Beans"), is a traditional Chinese cipai, or fixed tune pattern, used in the composition of ci poetry. Originating as a musical tune of the Tang dynasty, it developed into a short lyric form of 36 Chinese characters divided into two stanzas of four lines each. Its characteristic use of repeated rhymes and short opening lines provides a rhythmic framework for the expression of separation, longing, travel and personal remembrance.

The tune was used by poets including Bai Juyi, Li Yu, Lin Bu, Yan Jidao and Nalan Xingde. Its title identifies a metrical and musical pattern rather than the subject of an individual poem. The same title also occurs in earlier Chinese verse, including poems attributed to Li Bai, but those works do not necessarily follow the later ci pattern.

== History ==
The expression chang xiangsi, meaning endless longing, appeared in classical verse before it became the name of a regulated lyric tune. The Yuefu Shiji, preserves earlier poems under the title and connects their subject matter with separation, military service and remembrance of absent lovers.

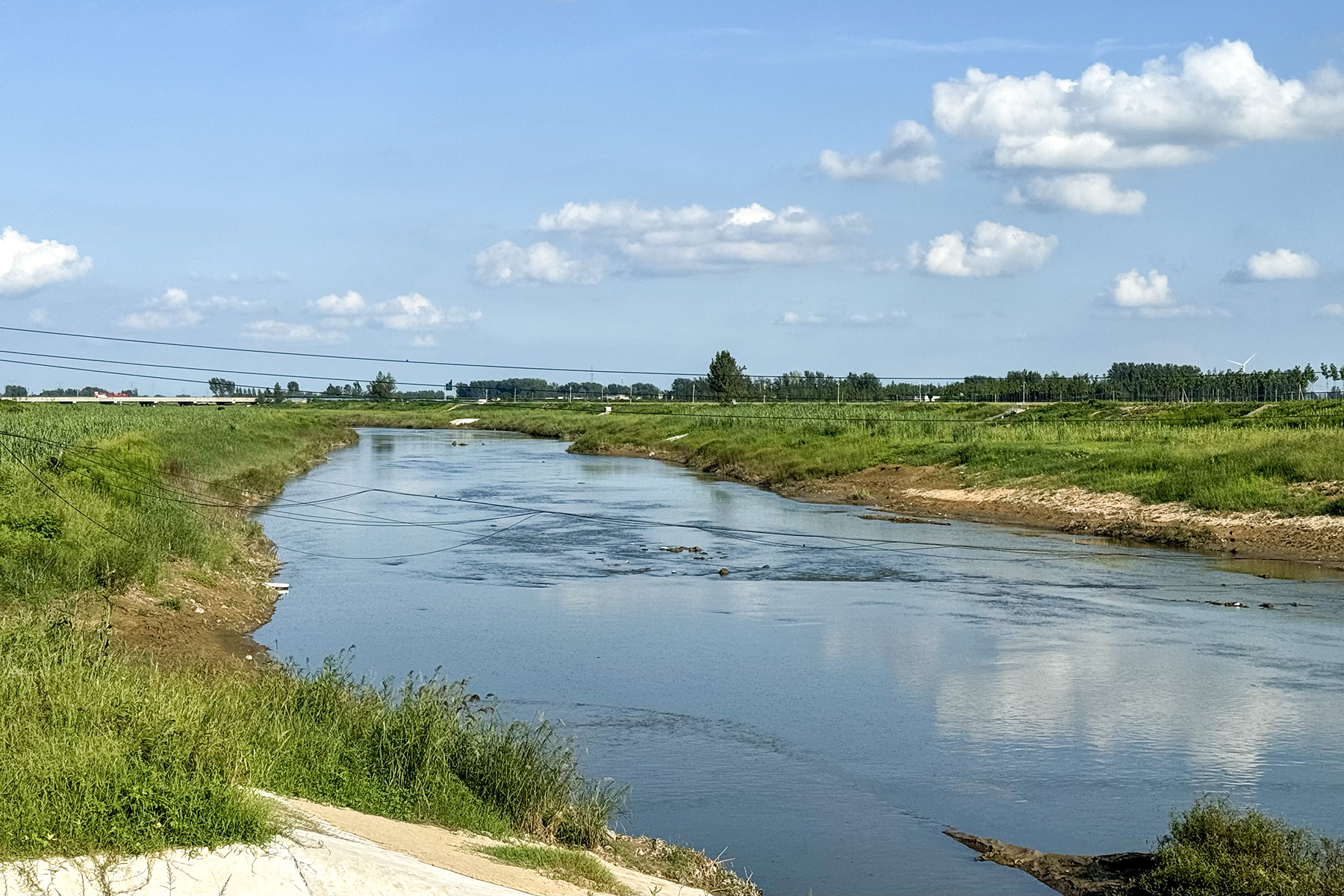
The remnant course of the Bian River, referred to in Bai Juyi's work

The fixed ci pattern emerged from the Tang musical repertoire. Bai Juyi's lyric beginning "Bian shui liu, Si shui liu" (汴水流, 泗水流, "The Bian River flows, the Si River flows") established a model of repeated phrases, flowing geographical imagery and concentrated emotional expression. The lyric follows the movement of rivers toward the south before turning to the sorrow of a woman awaiting an absent lover. Its two closely balanced stanzas became a principal model for the tune in later prosodic manuals.

During the Five Dynasties and Ten Kingdoms period and Song dynasty, Changxiangsi became an established short lyric form. Li Yu employed it for personal and romantic expression, while Lin Bu used paired references to mountains and rivers to depict separation. The tune remained in use during later dynasties. In the Qing dynasty, Nalan Xingde adapted its repetitive structure to a journey beyond the Great Wall, combining descriptions of mountain roads, military encampments, wind and snow with homesickness.

== Metrical structure ==
The standard form of Changxiangsi is classified as a shuangdiao xiaoling (雙調小令), a short ci lyric divided into two stanzas. Each stanza contains 18 Chinese characters arranged in four lines of three, three, seven and five characters, producing a total of 36 characters. The two stanzas use corresponding metrical structures, with three level-tone rhyme positions and a repeated rhyme in each stanza. The repetition at the beginning of each stanza is one of the tune's most recognizable features.

The pattern follows the traditional distinction between level tones (ping, 平) and oblique tones (ze, 仄). Although particular tonal positions permit variation, the overall structure maintains the alternation of two short phrases followed by a longer seven-character line and a concluding five-character line. The recurrence of the opening rhyme connects the first two lines, while the longer third line allows the image or thought to develop before the stanza reaches its conclusion.

== See also ==
- Cipai
