= Fangweng ci biannian jianzhu =

Chronicled and annotated collection of Ci lyrics

Fangweng ci biannian jianzhu (simplified Chinese: 放翁词编年笺注; traditional Chinese: 放翁詞編年箋註; Chronologically annotated Ci poems of Fangweng) is a chronicled and annotated collection of Ci lyrics by the Song dynasty poet Lu You (1125–1210), whose hào was Fangweng (放翁).

It was compiled and edited by the scholars Xia Chengtao (夏承焘) and Wu Xionghe (吴熊和), the work organizes Lu You's poems chronologically and provides detailed commentary on their literary and historical contexts. Its focus is on the Weinan wenji after the Sibu congkan-edition of a Ming movable type print of the Hua family, a historical printed edition, and it is referenced in the bibliographic section of the Hanyu Da Zidian (HYDZD). The collection focuses on Lu You's Ci poetry, offering a systematic arrangement by date and including extensive annotations. Fangweng ci biannian jianzhu was published in 1981 by Shanghai Guji Chubanshe, making previously scattered or difficult-to-access editions of Lu You's lyrics more available to researchers. A new edition was published in 2012 by the same publisher.

== See also ==
- Shanghai Guji Chubanshe (Chinese)

== Bibliography ==
- Xia Chengtao (夏承焘) and Wu Xionghe (吴熊和): Fangweng ci biannian jianzhu 放翁词编年笺注. Shanghai Guji Chubanshe, Shanghai 1981 (revised and expanded edition 2012)
