= Liu Sai =

Song dynasty scholar-official

Liu Sai (Chinese: 劉賽; ? - after 1033) was a scholar-official of the Song dynasty. He held various important governmental positions, including Prefect of Tanzhou and Guangzhou, as well as Deputy Minister of the Court of Imperial Sacrifices (太常少卿).

== Career ==
Liu Sai began his official career as a distinguished local scholar and steadily advanced through the ranks of the Song bureaucracy. One of his earliest recorded positions was a dual appointment as bureau director in the Ministry of Justice (刑部郎中) and judge in the Revenue Section (戶部判官) of the State Finance Commission (三司). He later served as a director (郎中, Langzhong) in the Ministry of War (兵部). Following his service in the capital, Liu Sai was appointed Prefect of Tanzhou (知潭州), in what is now Changsha, Hunan Province. His appointment is documented in the Quan Song Wen (Complete Prose of the Song Dynasty), which praised him as a man of "upright, honest, and pure character, whose work was comprehensive and well-ordered" (性劭直清，業總和濟). The imperial edict also commended his dedication, stating, "He has indeed worked hard, and his reputation is excellent" (躬實勞止，譽亦藹然).

In the eighth month, on the dingwei day, of the second year of the Mingdao reign of Emperor Renzong of Song, the Song court dispatched Liu Sai, along with officials Fu Weizhong (符惟忠), Li Zhaoshu (李昭述), and Zhang Maoshi (张茂实), as envoys to the Khitan Liao dynasty. They were sent to express gratitude to the Khitan Empress Dowager Xiao and the Khitan ruler for their condolences and participation in the memorial rites.

Liu Sai's career continued to flourish, indicating significant imperial favor. He was appointed Deputy Minister of the Court of Imperial Sacrifices (太常少卿). Concurrently, he served as a scholar-official in the Zhaowen Hall (直昭文館), a highly esteemed scholarly institution. His final recorded position was as Prefect of Panyu (番禺), which is present-day Guangzhou.
