= Pozhenzi =

Chinese ci poetry tune pattern

- Traditional Chinese: 破陣子
- Simplified Chinese: 破阵子
- Literal meaning: Army-breaker
Transcriptions
Standard Mandarin
- Hanyu Pinyin: Pòzhènzǐ

Pozhenzi (simplified Chinese: 破阵子; traditional Chinese: 破陣子; pinyin: Pòzhènzǐ), also known as Shipaizi (十拍子; "Ten Beats"), is a Chinese cipai, a fixed form of Ci poetry. Originating in a music of the Tang dynasty, it developed into an established literary form during the Five Dynasties and Ten Kingdoms period and reached its greatest prominence under the Song dynasty. Its standard form consists of 62 Chinese characters arranged in two stanzas of five lines each, with a prescribed sequence of line lengths, tonal patterns and rhymes.

The tune originated in the martial music associated with the Tang imperial court before becoming a vehicle for personal reflection, historical remembrance, romantic sentiment and patriotic expression. Its development reflects the transformation of ci from lyrics associated with musical performance into an independent form of literary composition. Most famous Pozhenzi works were filled by Li Yu, Yan Shu, Su Shi and Xin Qiji.

Mural Depicting Dance Poses of Pochen Yue (破陣樂, Army-breaking Music), Dunhuang

== Metrical structure ==
Pozhenzi is a two-stanza lyric pattern known in traditional Chinese prosody as a Shuangdiao (雙調). In its standard form, each stanza contains five lines with successive lengths of six, six, seven, seven and five Chinese characters. Each stanza therefore contains 31 characters, producing a total of 62 characters distributed across ten lines. The second, fourth and fifth lines of each stanza end in level-tone rhymes, giving the complete lyric six prescribed rhyme positions.

The standard pattern recorded by Long Yusheng in Tang Song Ci Gelü (唐宋詞格律) may be expressed as follows, with Ping (平) representing a level tone, Ze (仄) an oblique tone, X a position permitting either tonal category, and R a rhyming line ending. Each of the two stanzas follows the same arrangement: Z Z P P X Z; X P X Z P P (R); X Z X P P Z Z; X Z P P X Z P (R); X P X Z P (R). This notation represents the conventional prosodic template rather than the pronunciation of the words in modern Mandarin.

== See Also ==
- Cipai
