= Fonqhwang Hairpin =

Fonqhwang Hairpin (Chinese:釵頭鳳 GwoRo:Chai Tou Fonq), titled Ci, is a type of lyric poetry in the Classical Chinese poetry tradition. It was originally called The Ci of Picking Followers (Chinese:撷芳詞 GwoRo:Shye Fang Tsyr), Cutting Red Followers (Chinese:擷紅英 GwoRo:Shye Hornging), Picking Red Followers (Chinese:摘紅英 GwoRo:Jeai Hornging), or Dividing Hairpin Sadly (Chinese:惜分釵 GwoRo:Siq Fen chai). Picking Followers-Strong Wind (Chinese:《擷芳詞·風搖動》) comes from Guujin Tsyr huah (Chinese:《古今詞話》) and is considered the standard form. The most famous Fonqhwang Hairpin was written by Lu You.

== Rules and forms ==
No set rule defines Ci. The song's context decides what changes are appropriate. Like other Ci, Fonqhwang Hairpin has many forms. In the following part, 'L' is used to express letel, 'C' to express contour, and 'M' means either one can do.

=== The standard form ===
LLC MMC CLMCLLC LMC MLCC CCLM CLLC

LLC MLC MLMCMLC LLC MLC MMMM CLMC

(Picking followers-Strong Wind)

=== Variant 1 ===
LLC LCC CLCCLLC LLC LLC CCLL CLLC C C

LLC LLC CLCCLLC LLC LLC CCLL CLLC C C

(Fonqhwang Hairpin-Drink in Cold food festival)

=== Variant 2 ===
MLC LLC CMMCLLC CLL CLL CMLM MCLL L L

LLC LLC CLMCLLC CLL CLL CMMM MCLL L L

(Deviding Hairpin Sadly-drew the window)

== The famous Ci of Fonqhwang Hairpin ==
Chinese	Gwoyeu Romatzyh	English Translation
釵頭鳳	Chaitourfonq	Fonqhwang Hairpin
陸游	Luq You	Lu You
紅酥手 黃藤酒	Horngsushoou, Hwangterngtzeou,	Pink soft hands, yellow rippling wine,
滿城春色宮墻柳	Maancheng chunseq gongtsyang leou.	The town is filled with Spring, willows by palace walls.
東風惡 歡情薄	Dongfong ngoq, huantsirng boq,	The east wind is biting, happiness is thin,
一杯愁緒 幾秂離索	Iq bei chorushiw, jii gnian lyishoq.	heart full of sorrow, so many years apart.
錯錯錯	Tsoq tsoq tsoq.	Wrong, Wrong, Wrong.
萅如舊 人空瘦	Chun ru jiow, ren kong show,	Spring is as of old, the person is empty and thin,
淚痕紅浥鮫綃透	lueyhern horngih jiausiau tow.	Traces of tears show through the sheer silk.
桃花落 閒池閣	Taruhua loq, shyan chyr geq,	Peach blossoms falling, glimmering pond freezing,
山盟雖在 錦書難托	shanmeng suei tzay, jiinshu nan toq.	The huge oath remains, the brocade book is hard to hold.
莫莫莫	Moq moq moq.	Don't, Don't, Don't.

== See also ==
- Cipai
