= Ancestors: 900 Years in the Life of a Chinese Family =

1988 book by Frank Ching

- First edition
- Author: Frank Ching
- Language: English
- Genre: History, China Studies
- Publisher: Morrow
- Publication date: 1988
- Publication place: United States
- Media type: Print (hardback)
- ISBN: 0-688-04461-1
- OCLC: 595601607

Ancestors: 900 Years in the Life of a Chinese Family is a book first published in 1988 written by the Hong Kong–based journalist Frank Ching, in which he tells the story of his ancestors in the Qin (秦) family, beginning with the 11th-century Song dynasty poet Qin Guan. He also relates many details about the history of Wuxi, Jiangsu Province, the home of the Qin clan. The book has since been translated into other languages and published in France, the Netherlands, China, and Taiwan. An updated edition was published in 2009 by Rider, a part of Random House. Frank Ching is knowledgeable about Chinese history and has conducted extensive research.

"Qin" is the standard pinyin romanization of Frank Ching's surname.

== Song and Yuan dynasties ==
Qin Guan (1049–1100) is the earliest prominent ancestor whom Ching writes about. A poet and government official, he was a close personal friend and political ally of the prominent official Su Dongpo. After two failed attempts, Qin Guan passed the metropolitan examinations in 1085 and eventually became an instructor at a Confucian school in Caizhou. He attempted to take the special court examination at the Song capital of Kaifeng, but was blocked by Neo-Confucian elements at court who disapproved of his relatively dissolute lifestyle – he was known to be intimate with several courtesans – and because of his association with Su Dongpo's faction. From 1090 onwards, he held a minor government post in Kaifeng. Later he and many other government officials fell out of favor in 1094 when the Empress Dowager died and Emperor Zhezong began to rule in his own right. Qin Guan worked as a minor government official in a series of small towns until his death.

The second figure Ching describes is Qin Hui (1090–1155) a man almost universally hated as a traitor to the Chinese people. In 1127 the Northern Song dynasty collapsed when the Jurchens captured Kaifeng. Remnants of the Song court founded the Southern Song dynasty in the city of Hangzhou, under Emperor Gaozong. In the years following the formation of the Southern Song dynasty, the Song general Yue Fei led successful military campaigns against the Jurchens. However, Song government officials, including Qin Hui, believed an ultimate military victory was impossible and feared that Yue's successes made a peaceful coexistence with the Jurchens unlikely. Yue Fei was recalled to Hangzhou, imprisoned, and murdered on Qin Hui's orders. Frank Ching argues that Qin Hui was probably neither a relative of Qin Guan, nor an ancestor of the modern Qin clan. He also cautions against excessively demonizing Qin, noting that some objective historians have called Qin a "scapegoat" for Emperor Gaozong, whom many Chinese historians have been reluctant to criticize directly.

Qin Yubo (1295–1374), a seventh-generation descendant of Qin Guan, worked as a government official until he retired to Shanghai in 1354. In the late 1360s, as the Yuan dynasty was disintegrating, the warlord Zhu Yuanzhang repeatedly asked for Qin Yubo's services, a request to which Qin very reluctantly agreed. In 1368 Zhu Yuanzhang founded the Ming dynasty and declared himself the Hongwu Emperor. Qin Yubo was named a chief examination official in the Ming capital of Nanjing, and later prefect of Longzhou. After his death, the Hongwu Emperor appointed him the City God of Shanghai.

== Ming dynasty ==
Qin Xu (1410–1495) was a well-known rustic poet of Wuxi. He was the founder of the Blue Mountain Poetry Society, a local group of intellectuals who disdained political ambitions. Frank Ching interweaves the story of Qin Xu with the story of his son Qin Hui (1434–1496), who passed the metropolitan examinations at age twenty-six and went on to a distinguished career in government. Ching also relates the story of the bamboo stove.

Qin Jin (1467–1544) served the Ming government in a variety of postings in the early 16th century. The son of a Wuxi schoolteacher, Qin Jin passed the metropolitan examinations in 1493 and became a government official. He served as governor of Huguang Province from 1514 to 1520. During this time, he personally led government forces in a series of campaigns to exterminate bandits in the region. In 1523 Qin was serving as minister of rites in Nanjing when he took the risky move of writing an official memorandum directly criticizing the policies and conduct of the Jiajing Emperor. Far from ending his career, one consequence of the memorandum was a promotion to a cabinet position in Beijing. He became known as a minister who often opposed the Jiajing Emperor's policies. Over the next few years, Qin was forcibly retired, then reinstated, this time as minister of works. He retired to Wuxi in 1536.

Qin Liang (1515–1578) passed the metropolitan examinations in 1547 and became a prefectural judge in Nanchang, where he became known as a careful and scrupulous official. He was transferred to Beijing in 1551, but he incurred the wrath of the Jiajing Emperor when he refused to take part in the Daoist ceremonies the emperor favored. He was badly beaten with a bastinado. He retained his position in Beijing for several years, and helped supervise the expansion of the Beijing city walls. He was transferred to Nanjing in 1558, but demoted to a position in Zhejiang Province in 1563, probably as a result of his close association with the disgraced former Grand Secretary Yan Song. He retired permanently from the civil service in 1566, and devoted the rest of his life to writing, including a major revision of the local history Wuxi Gazetteer.

Qin Yao (1544–1604) was the son of Qin He, who had achieved renown for leading the defense of the town of Wukang from pirates in the 1550s. Qin Yao passed the metropolitan examinations in 1571 and quickly rose high in the civil service, partly because he was a favorite of the powerful Grand Secretary Zhang Juzheng. Qin became governor of the Nankan area of Jiangxi in 1586 and soon took part in several victories with local bandit armies. In 1589 he served as governor of famine-stricken Huguang Province for several months. He was shocked at the sight of corpses lying by the roads, and successfully lobbied Beijing for relief. The following year, Qin, who had built up an enormous personal fortune, was accused of bribery and embezzlement. His career was effectively over. He retired to Wuxi, where he spent the rest of his life.

Qin Yong (1597–1661) was a student at the Donglin Academy in Wuxi, where he was a favorite student of academy founder Gao Panlong. In 1637 Qin became magistrate of Qingjiang district, in Jiangxi Province. As magistrate, Qin wrote a history of Qingjiang which traced the region's history back to the beginning of the Ming dynasty. In 1643 Qin was reassigned to be the magistrate of Fenglai District in Shandong Province, but shortly afterwards the Ming dynasty collapsed. Qin remained loyal to the Ming, and lived peacefully in retirement in Wuxi for the remainder of his life.

In the same chapter, Frank Ching also tells the story of Qin Yong's nephew Qin Xian (1616–1698), who declared allegiance to the warlord Li Zicheng immediately after Li chased the Ming out of Beijing in 1644, in the mistaken belief that Li would found a durable new dynasty. In reality Li's rule lasted only a month before he was defeated by the Manchu invasion. Having cast his lot with Li, Qin Xian had no prospects of employment with the newly established Qing dynasty. Qin retired to Wuxi for the remaining fifty-four years of his life.

== Qing dynasty ==
Qin Songling (1637–1714) was a great-grandson of Qin Yao. He passed the metropolitan examinations in 1655, an extraordinary feat for an eighteen-year-old, and became the youngest-ever member of the Hanlin Academy. His career suffered a setback in 1660 when he was suspended for nonpayment of taxes. He was probably personally innocent of any wrongdoing, but the taxes were on property that a relative of his had registered under his name without his knowledge. Over time his reputation was rehabilitated, and in 1679 he was readmitted to Hanlin. In 1681 Qin Songling was appointed to the exalted position of keeper of the imperial diary, which kept him in close contact with the Kangxi Emperor. He took responsibility for overseeing the examinations for the district including Beijing in 1684, but a scandal forced him to retire that same year. He was not disgraced, however. The Kangxi Emperor would call on him several times at his home in Wuxi over the remainder of his life.

Qin Daoran (1657–1747) was the son of Qin Songling. Upon his father's recommendation, in 1703 he became the official tutor of the Kangxi Emperor's ninth son, Prince Yintang. Over the following years, the Qing dynasty became embroiled in a controversy over which of the Kangxi Emperor's sons would succeed the aging monarch, as the emperor stripped his second son Yinreng of his position as crown prince, then reinstated him, then demoted him again and refused to name a new heir apparent. With no clear successor to Kangxi, Yintang supported his older brother Prince Yinsi. The Kangxi Emperor suddenly died in 1722, and his fourth son Prince Yinzhen quickly had himself installed as the Yongzheng Emperor. He quickly moved to suppress the rival claims of his brothers, and as a supporter of Yintang and Yinsi, Qin Daoran was imprisoned and threatened with execution. Interrogated repeatedly over several years, Qin Daoran attempted to cooperate fully and testified about several years of treasonous and unseemly behavior by the princes. In the end, Qin Daoran was not executed but received an enormous fine, which he and his family was never able to pay. He was imprisoned in a cell in his hometown of Wuxi until 1737.

Qin Huitian (1707–1764) won the release of his elderly father Qin Daoran by appealing to the Qianlong Emperor. He served in the imperial bureaucracy, becoming vice-minister of rites in 1742 and vice-minister of punishments in 1752, and wrote the Comprehensive Study of the Five Rites, which was finished in 1761. In 1755 Qin Huitian was named to a highly prestigious position, that of a lecturer on classics to the emperor and his ministers. He was promoted to minister of works, then minister of punishments. In his later years Qin Huitian took on varied responsibilities, serving also as grand minister of the Board of State Music and Chancellor of Hanlin Academy, despite deteriorating eyesight which made the meticulous calligraphy required of a Chinese minister difficult. As Qin Huitian's health declined the emperor repeatedly refused his requests to be allowed to retire; in late 1764 he was finally granted permission to return to Wuxi for convalescence, but he died en route.

Qin Zhenjun (1735–1807), grandnephew of Qin Daoran, achieved renown in October 1774 for his role in defending the city of Linqing from Wang Lun's White Lotus rebels.

Qin LianKui (1888–19??) was the father of the author.

== Reaction ==
The history has been received well in a number of places. One review brought forth this comment from Orville Schell,

... a stunning accomplishment in which, by recounting individual lives of members of his own clan, Mr. Ching brings to life the last nine centuries of Chinese history and culture as almost no other work in the English language has done.

And from John K. Fairbank's analysis of the work we have the following comments,

Ancestors is one of the most interesting clan studies thus far. Its graphic picture of how the old ruling class functioned makes it of value to historians as well as to the general reader.

== Additions in the 2009 edition ==
The Rider 2009 edition includes a new prologue and an epilogue in which he discusses events of the previous twenty years, including ancestral graves that had been demolished as a result of the economic development of Wuxi as well as how writing Ancestors prompted him to have a son of his own. The epilogue also reports that the Qin clan in Wuxi published the 10th edition of the family genealogy in 2007, updating the ancestral records for the first time since the 1920s. For the first time, women were given their own entries in the family records. Ching also anticipates celebrations to mark the 960th anniversary of the birth of Qin Guan in 2009—the conclusion of 16 sixty-year cycles, which carries special meaning in China—and notes that one descendant of Qin Guan, Republic of China (Taiwan) President Ma Ying-Jeou, whose mother Chin Hou-hsiu (秦厚修) is a Qin, would probably be unable to attend.
