= Cipai =

Named tune-title and metrical pattern used in Chinese ci poetry

- Traditional Chinese: 詞牌
- Simplified Chinese: 词牌
- Literal meaning: ci label; tune title
Transcriptions
Standard Mandarin
- Hanyu Pinyin: cípái
- Wade–Giles: tzʻu-pʻai

Cipai (simplified Chinese: 词牌; traditional Chinese: 詞牌; pinyin: cípái), often translated as "tune title", "ci tune pattern", or "ci melody title", is the name of a fixed tune and metrical pattern used in the composition of ci poetry, a genre of classical Chinese song lyric. A cipai originally denoted the melody to which a ci text was fitted; in later literary practice, it came to function mainly as the name of a formal template governing line length, stanza division, rhyme positions, and tonal arrangement.

Cipai is not usually the subject title of an individual poem. Rather, it indicates the inherited tune pattern according to which the poem is written. Different poems may therefore share the same cipai while expressing entirely different themes. In traditional notation, a poem may be identified by its cipai, followed by a subtitle, preface, or incipit.

== Terminology ==
The term cipai combines ci (詞), referring to the lyric genre, and pai (牌), meaning "label", "sign", or "title". Related terms include cidiao (詞調), meaning "ci tune" or "ci mode", and cipu (詞譜), referring to manuals or catalogues that record the formal patterns of ci tunes.

== History ==
Ci poetry developed from lyrics written to music. The form began to emerge in the Sui and Tang dynasties, took shape during the Five Dynasties period, and flourished in the Song dynasty. Encyclopaedia Britannica describes ci as a Chinese poetic song form characterized by irregular line lengths, prescribed rhyme schemes, and tonal patterns, each associated with the name of a musical air.

In early practice, poets wrote words to pre-existing melodies. The name of the melody became the label of the lyric pattern. Over time, these labels were transmitted as cipai. In the Song dynasty, poets such as Liu Yong, Su Shi, Li Qingzhao, Zhou Bangyan, and Xin Qiji greatly developed the genre and expanded its literary range.

=== Separation from melody ===
The separation of cipai from actual musical performance was gradual rather than sudden. In the Tang, Five Dynasties, and early Song periods, ci was closely connected with singing and banquet music. By the Northern Song, however, the genre increasingly acquired independent literary status. The Academy of Chinese Studies notes that Su Shi expanded ci from lyrics sung by entertainers into a major literary form and broadened its subject matter beyond earlier conventions.

As the melodies associated with older cipai ceased to be transmitted, poets increasingly composed according to written prosodic patterns rather than living tunes. By the Qing dynasty, poets still composed large numbers of ci even though many earlier tunes had been lost; some Qing writers attempted to create new tunes or reconcile lyrics and melodies anew. In this later usage, a cipai functioned mainly as a literary metrical form.

== Form ==
Each cipai prescribes a particular formal structure. This may include the total number of lines, the number of characters or syllables in each line, the division into sections or stanzas, the rhyme scheme, and the required tonal category of individual syllables.

The tonal rules of cipai are traditionally based on the distinction between ping (平, level tones) and ze (仄, oblique tones). In practice, many patterns also allow variant positions, and a single cipai may have more than one accepted form. Zhu Huiguo describes the study of ci tunes and prosody as a central component of modern ci studies, noting that the tune is the carrier of the prosody of a given ci.

Some cipai are short, while others are long and complex. Traditional classifications of ci by length include xiaoling (小令, short lyric), zhongdiao (中調, medium-length lyric), and changdiao (長調, long lyric).

== Function as title ==
In many editions of classical Chinese poetry, the cipai appears where a modern reader might expect a title. However, it usually indicates the formal pattern rather than the topic of the poem. A poem written to the tune title Shui Diao Ge Tou may concern the moon, exile, political emotion, or private longing; the shared feature is the metrical pattern, not the content.

Traditional citation often separates the cipai from a subtitle or incipit. For example, Su Shi's famous Mid-Autumn poem is commonly referred to as Shui Diao Ge Tou: Mingyue jishi you (水調歌頭·明月幾時有), where Shui Diao Ge Tou is the cipai and Mingyue jishi you is the opening phrase.

== List of famous cipai ==
Well-known cipai include:

Cipai	Pinyin	Literal Meaning	Number of characters
憶江南	Yì Jiāngnán	Recalling the lands south of the Changjiang	27
如夢令	Rú Mèng Lìng	As if in a dream	33
長相思	Cháng Xiāngsī	Endless longing	36
搗練子	Dǎo Liàn Zǐ	Pounding white silk (a women's domestic chore in old China)	27
漁歌子	Yú Gē Zǐ	Fisherman's song	27
浣溪沙	Huàn Xī Shā	Washing silk by a creek (alluding to the legendary beauty Xi Shi)	42
菩薩蠻	Púsà Mán	Originally referring to the hairstyle and attire of women from the Nanzhao kingdom, said to resemble bodhisattvas	44
卜算子	Bǔ Suàn Zǐ	Song of the fortune-teller	44
減字木蘭花	Jiǎnzì Mùlán Huā	A shortened version of "Magnolia Flower"	44
採桑子	Cǎi Sāng Zǐ	Picking mulberry leaves	44
謁金門	Yè Jīn Mén	An audience at the Golden Gate (the Han imperial palace gate)	45
訴衷情	Sù Zhōng Qíng	Pouring out one's innermost feelings	45
好事近	Hǎo Shì Jìn	Good fortune is near at hand	45
憶秦娥	Yì Qín É	Remembering the maiden of Qin (alluding to Nongyu, who flew off with her flute-playing husband Xiao Shi)	46
清平樂	Qīng Píng Yuè	Music in the Qingping mode, suggesting peaceful times	46
更漏子	Gēng Lòu Zǐ	Song of the night water-clock dripping through the watches	46
阮郎歸	Ruǎn Láng Guī	Young Master Ruan returns (alluding to Ruan Zhao, who met immortal maidens on Mount Tiantai and returned to find generations had passed)	47
畫堂春	Huà Táng Chūn	Spring within a painted hall	47
西江月	Xī Jiāng Yuè	The moon over the western river	50
南歌子	Nán Gē Zǐ	A song of the south	52
醉花陰	Zuì Huā Yīn	Drunk in the shade of flowers	52
浪淘沙	Làng Táo Shā	Waves washing over the sand	54
鷓鴣天	Zhègū Tiān	A sky filled with the calls of partridges	55
鵲橋仙	Quèqiáo Xiān	Immortals meeting on the Magpie Bridge (alluding to the annual reunion of the Cowherd and Weaver Girl)	56
虞美人	Yú Měirén	Lady Yu, the beloved consort of the warlord Xiang Yu, who took her own life on the battlefield	56
南鄉子	Nán Xiāng Zǐ	A song of the southern countryside	56
玉樓春	Yù Lóu Chūn	Spring in the jade tower	56
一剪梅	Yī Jiǎn Méi	A single sprig of plum blossom	60
臨江仙	Lín Jiāng Xiān	An immortal by the river	60
蝶戀花	Dié Liàn Huā	Butterflies in love with flowers	60
釵頭鳳	Chāi Tóu Fèng	A phoenix-shaped ornament on a hairpin	60
漁家傲	Yú Jiā Ào	The proud spirit of a fisherman's household	62
破陣子	Pò Zhèn Zǐ	Army-breaking Song (originally a Tang military dance tune celebrating victory)	62
蘇幕遮	Sū Mù Zhē	A transliteration of a Central Asian tune name, originally accompanying a water-splashing festival dance	62
青玉案	Qīng Yù Àn	A tray of green jade (from a Han-dynasty poem about a treasured gift)	67
江城子	Jiāng Chéng Zǐ	A small town beside the river	70
風入松	Fēng Rù Sōng	Wind passing through the pines	76
滿江紅	Mǎn Jiāng Hóng	The whole river dyed red (by sunset glow or fallen petals)	93
水調歌頭	Shuǐ Diào Gē Tóu	The opening section of the grand "Water Melody" suite	95
八聲甘州	Bā Shēng Gānzhōu	Eight stanzas of the Ganzhou tune (named for a frontier region on the Silk Road)	97
聲聲慢	Shēng Shēng Màn	Note after note, slow and lingering	97
念奴嬌	Niàn Nú Jiāo	The charm of Niannu, a celebrated Tang-dynasty courtesan and singer	100
永遇樂	Yǒng Yù Yuè	The joy of an everlasting reunion	104
望海潮	Wàng Hǎi Cháo	Watching the sea tide (especially the famed tidal bore at Hangzhou Bay)	107
沁園春	Qìn Yuán Chūn	Spring at Qin Villa, the estate of a Han-dynasty princess	114
賀新郎	Hè Xīn Láng	Congratulating the bridegroom	116
摸魚兒	Mō Yú Ér	Groping for fish (from a folk fishing song)	116
蘭陵王	Lánlíng Wáng	The Prince of Lanling, a sixth-century general renowned for his beauty and valor in battle	131
鶯啼序	Yīng Tí Xù	A prelude of orioles' song	240

== See also ==
- Ci (poetry)
- Qupai
- Classical Chinese poetry forms
- Song poetry
- Sanqu
