= Gu Xiong =

10th-century Chinese official and poet

Gu Xiong (Chinese: 顧敻; fl. 10th century) was an official in the Five Dynasties and Ten Kingdoms period Former Shu (907–925) and Later Shu states (934–965). He was also a famous ci poet.
