= Frank Ching (journalist) =

American journalist, author, and columnist

Frank Ching is an American journalist, author, and columnist who has reported on China, Hong Kong, Taiwan, and East Asian affairs. He has worked for The New York Times, The Wall Street Journal, Far Eastern Economic Review, and South China Morning Post. In 1979, The Wall Street Journal assigned him to establish its Beijing bureau to provide direct reporting on China's shifting economy, economic reforms, and opening to foreign trade following the normalization of diplomatic relations between the United States and China. He has also served on the Hong Kong Government's Central Policy Unit, the Advisory Council of the Brookings Institution's Center for Northeast Asian Policy Studies, and has been a member of the National Committee on U.S.-China Relations.

== Early life and education ==
Ching’s family fled Shanghai after the Japanese invasion for Hong Kong, where he was born. He received his early education in the British colony from St Joseph’s College, a Roman Catholic missionary school.

Ching earned a Bachelor of Arts from Fordham University, a Master of Arts in Philosophy from New York University, and a Certificate in Advanced International Reporting from Columbia University as a Ford Foundation Fellow.

== Academic career ==
He served as Adjunct Associate Professor in the Department of History at the Chinese University of Hong Kong and as Adjunct Associate Professor in the School of Business at the Hong Kong University of Science and Technology. Ching has also delivered lectures at universities and policy institutions in the United States and Asia, including the inaugural Ravenholt-Severyns Lecture at the University of Washington in 2000. In 1998, he was invited by Admiral Joseph Prueher, then Commander-in-Chief of the U.S. Pacific Command, to serve as the inaugural luncheon speaker at the Chiefs of Defense Conference.

== Media commentary and writing ==
Ching has appeared on CNN and Channel News Asia (CNA) to discuss Chinese politics, Hong Kong, Taiwan, and U.S.–China relations. His commentary has covered Beijing’s 2014 White Paper on Hong Kong, the Umbrella Movement, the 2019 anti-extradition protests, and the leadership of Xi Jinping. He contributed to CNA’s documentary 100 Years: China’s Communist Century (2021) and hosted the weekly current affairs programme Newsline on Asia Television in Hong Kong.

== Books ==
Ching is the author of several books on Chinese history, Hong Kong, and political affairs. His book, Ancestors: 900 Years in the Life of a Chinese Family (1988), traces the history of his family across nine centuries and has been recognized for combining personal narrative with Chinese social and political history. His other books include Hong Kong and China: For Better or For Worse (1985), published following the Sino-British Joint Declaration; The Li Dynasty: Hong Kong Aristocrats (1999); China: The Truth About Its Human Rights Record (2008); and 130 Years of Medicine in Hong Kong (2018).
