= Shanghai Lexicographical Publishing House =

Chinese publishing company

Shanghai Lexicographical Publishing House (simplified Chinese: 上海辞书出版社; traditional Chinese: 上海辭書出版社; pinyin: Shànghǎi Císhū Chūbǎnshè) is a publishing house in mainland China, specialized in publishing reference works. Its precedent was the Ci Hai Editing Institute affiliated to Zhong Hua Book Co. (中华书局辞海编辑所), founded in August, 1958. From January, 1978, it adopted the current name. The Shanghai Lexicographical Publishing House published revised editions of Cihai, a large-scale dictionary and encyclopedia of Standard Mandarin Chinese, in 1979, 1989, 1999, and 2009. As of 2016, it is owned by Shanghai Century Publishing(Group) Co., Ltd. Its ISBN code is 7–5326.

The Publishing House is located on 457 North Shaanxi Rd of Jing'an District of Shanghai.

== Subsidiaries ==
- Zhonghua Books Library (traditional Chinese: 中華書局圖書館; simplified Chinese: 中华书局图书馆): Originally established in 1916 within the Zheng An road factory. In 1925, it was renamed to its current name (中華書局圖書館). In 1935, it was moved into the 4th floor of the newly built Macau factory. Between April and June 1978, it was moved to the Ci Hai Editing Institute building at Shanxi North Road, which was later owned by Shanghai Lexicographical Publishing House.
