= Lin Bu =

Chinese poet

- 林逋
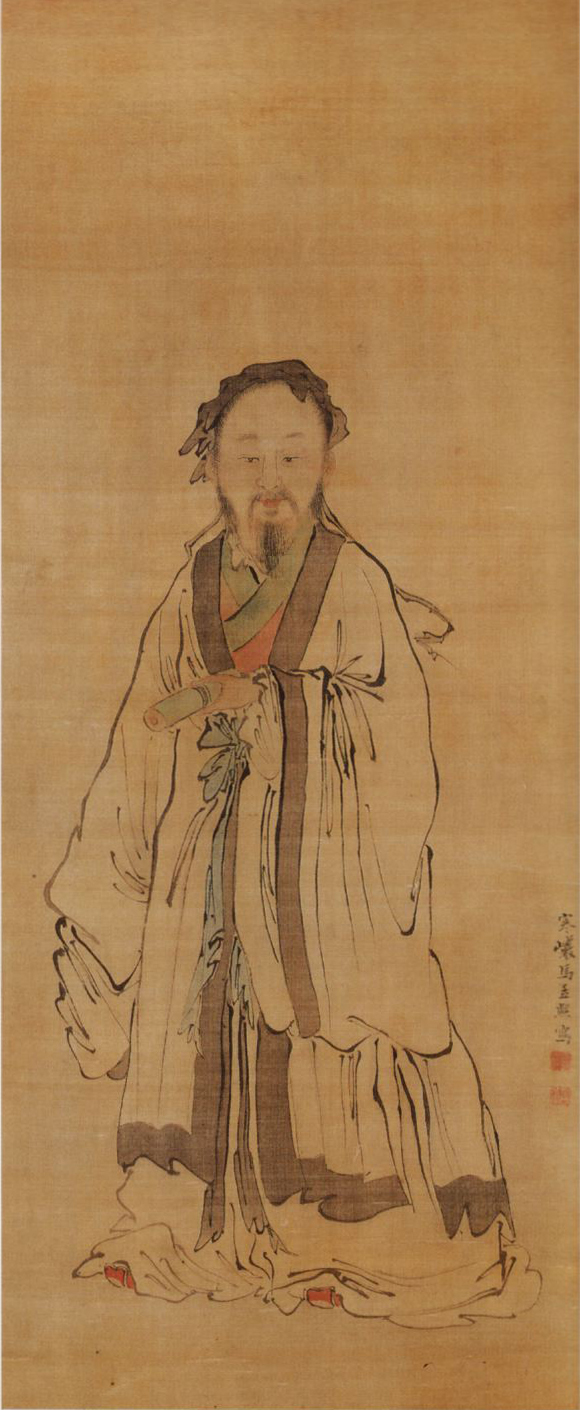
- Painting of Lin Bu by Kitayama Kangan (北山 寒厳). Japan, Edo period, 18th century
- Born: 967; Fenghua, Zhejiang, China
- Died: 1028 (aged 60–61); Hangzhou, Zhejiang, China
- Occupations: Poet; Hermit

Chinese name
- Chinese: 林逋
Transcriptions
Standard Mandarin
- Hanyu Pinyin: Lín Bū
- Wade–Giles: Lin Pu

Courtesy name Junfu
- Traditional Chinese: 君復
- Simplified Chinese: 君复
Transcriptions
Standard Mandarin
- Hanyu Pinyin: Jūnfù
- Wade–Giles: Chun-fu

Posthumous name Hejing Xiansheng
- Chinese: 和靖先生
Transcriptions
Standard Mandarin
- Hanyu Pinyin: Héjìng Xiānshēng
- Wade–Giles: Ho-ching Hsien-sheng

Lin Hejing
- Chinese: 林和靖
Transcriptions
Standard Mandarin
- Hanyu Pinyin: Lín Héjìng
- Wade–Giles: Lin Ho-ching

Nickname Buxian
- Chinese: 逋仙
- Literal meaning: the Fleeing Immortal
Transcriptions
Standard Mandarin
- Hanyu Pinyin: Būxiān
- Wade–Giles: Pu-hsien

Lin Bu (967–1028), formerly romanized as Lin Pu and also known by his posthumous name as Lin Hejing, was a Chinese poet and recluse during the Northern Song dynasty.

== Life ==
One of the most famous verse masters of his era, Lin Bu was born in 967, a time when Hangzhou was still the capital of the independent kingdom of Wuyue. This was absorbed by Song in 978. Lin lived as a recluse on Gushan ("Solitary Island") in West Lake from about the age of 40 until his death in 1028. At the time, the lake was outside Hangzhou's walls and he supposedly never deigned to enter them. He was never, however, a strict hermit: he had servants and met and talked constantly with nearby scholars, Buddhist monks, and other guests. He was famed for his skill at Chinese chess and the guqin, as well as writing. If visitors arrived while he was boating on the lake, he would be summoned back by seeing one of his cranes released by his staff. His supposed grave has been restored on Gushan Island, along with a commemorative pavilion called the "Crane Releasing Pavilion" (放鶴亭, Fànghètíng).

His descendant Lin Hong (林洪) later imitated his lifestyle, retiring to a hermitage on Gushan as well in the 13th century.

== Works ==
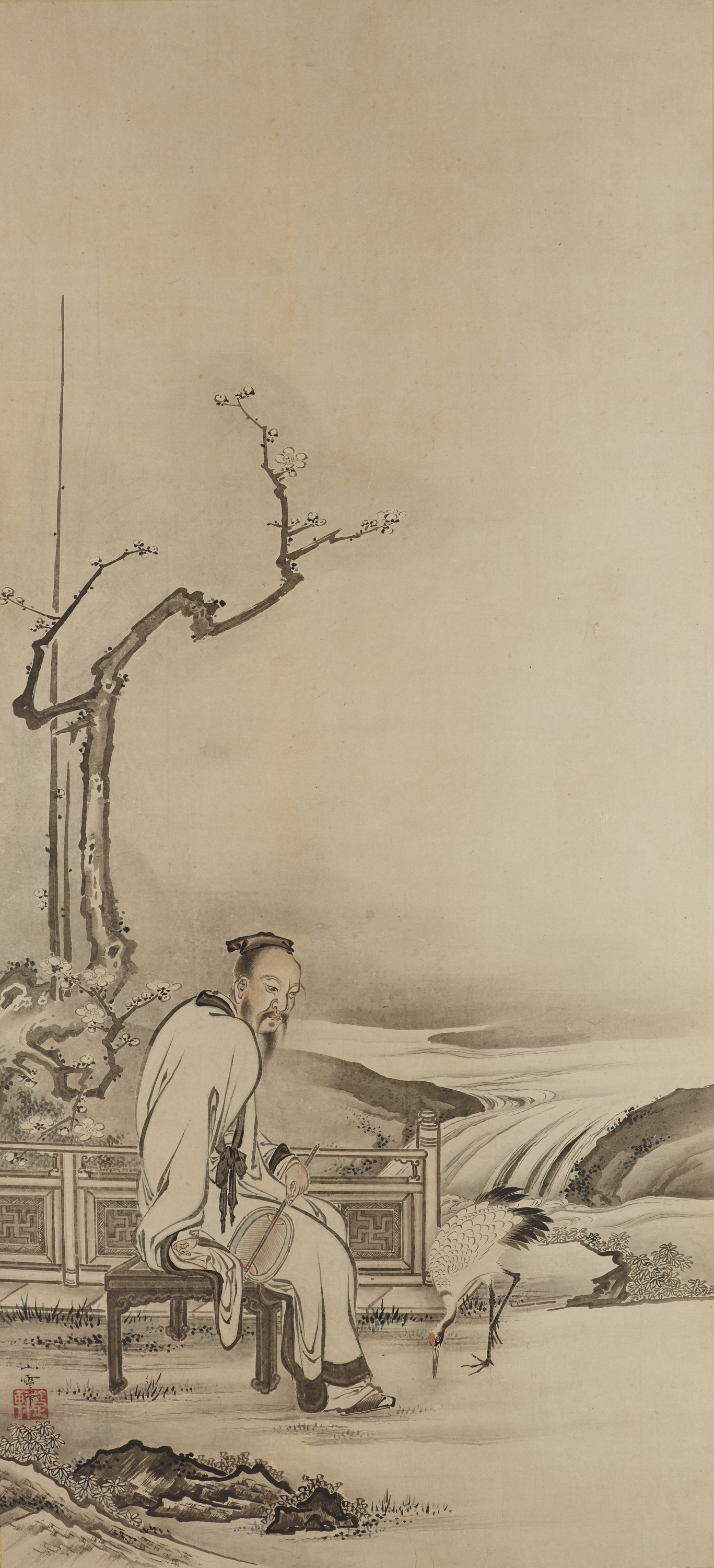
Painting of Lin Bu by Kanō Sansetsu. Japan, Edo period, 17th century.

His works and theatrical solitude won him nationwide fame, and he was offered prestigious government posts, although he refused all civic duties in pursuit of his poetry. Long after he died, Lin's eccentric attitude and his works retained a vivid place in Song cultural imagination and later works. His supposed claim that the plum blossom was his wife and the cranes he raised were his sons became a standard motif in Chinese poetry concerning seclusion from the world.

Lin is well known for his romantic poems. The most famous and influential was a couplet from the two-verse "Small Plum in a Mountain Garden" (《山園小梅》, Shānyuán Xiǎoméi), also known as "How Plum Flowers Embarrass a Garden".

疏影橫斜水清淺，	Shū yǐng héng xié shuǐ qīng qiǎn,	Sparse shadows crossing, Slanting waters clear and shoal,
暗香浮動月黃昏。	àn xiāng fúdòng yuè huánghūn.	Hidden fragrance floating, Drifting moon yellow and dim.

It was prized as a vivid instance of appreciating quiet subtle beauty in mundane things; allusions to it became a way of signalling other writers' own similar sophistication.

Another example of his work is "Everlasting Longing" (《長相思》, Chángxiāngsī):

吴山青。	Wúshān qīng.	The northern hills so green,
越山青。	Yuèshān qīng.	The southern hills so green,
兩岸青山相對迎。	Liǎng'àn qīngshān xiāngduì yíng.	They greet your ship which sails the river between.
爭忍有離情。	Shuí zhī líbié qíng.	My grief at parting is so keen.
君淚盈。	Jūn lèi yíng.	Tears streaming from your eyes,
妾淚盈。	Qiè lèi yíng.	Tears streaming from my eyes,
羅帶同心結未成。	Luó dài tóngxīn jié wèichéng.	In vain we tried to join by marriage ties.
江邊潮已平。	Jiāngtóu cháo yǐ píng.	I see the silent river rise.

He is traditionally associated with the guqin piece "Moon atop a Plum Tree" (梅梢月, Meishao Yue), believed to resemble his "Small Plum in a Mountain Garden". In Japan, the melodies "Plum Blossoms" (梅花) and "Flying Snow Crystal Intonation" (飛瓊吟) traditionally employ lyrics drawn from Lin Bu's poetry.

== Gallery ==
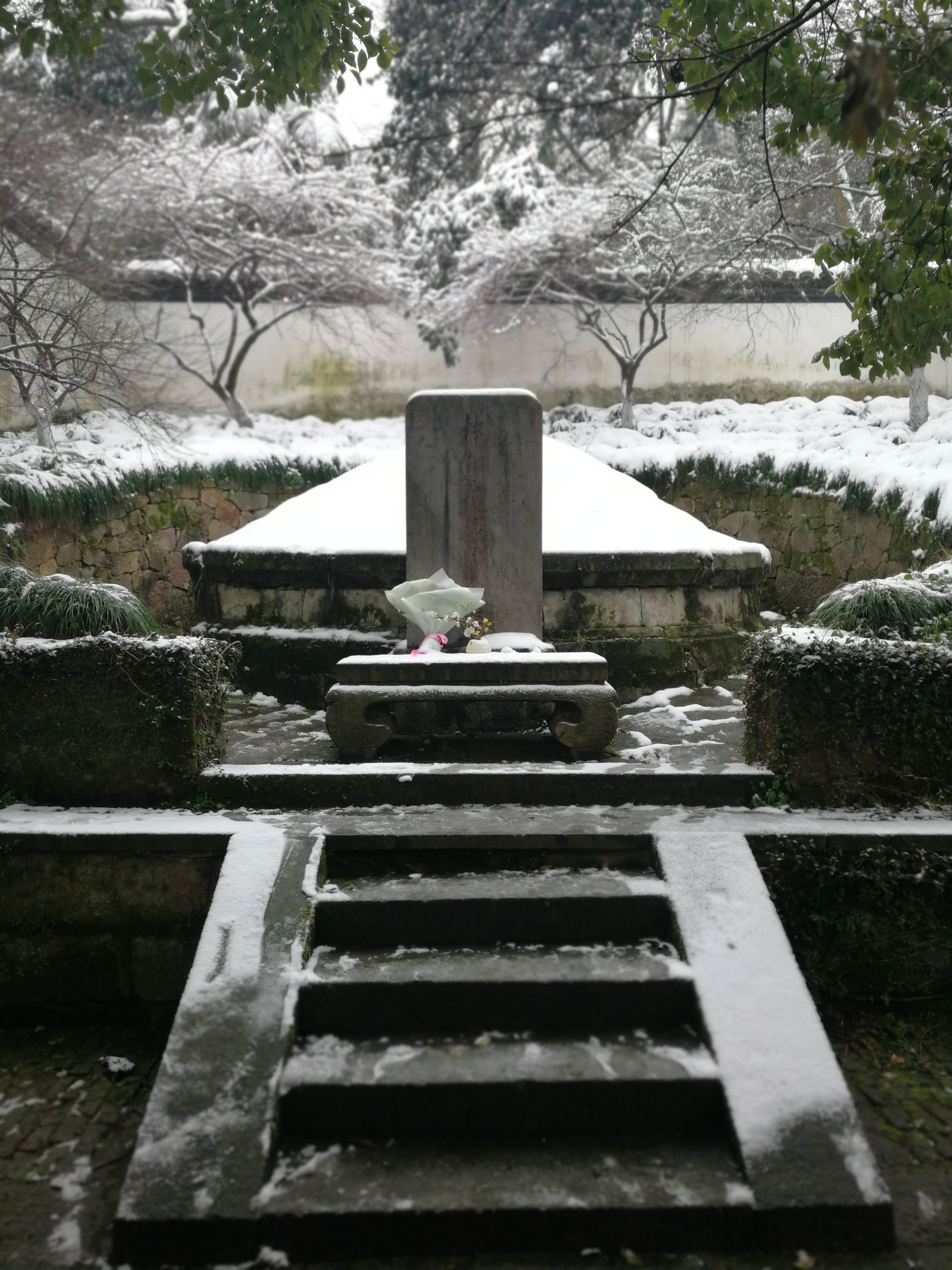
Lin Bu's Tomb on Gushan Island, West Lake, Hangzhou (2018)

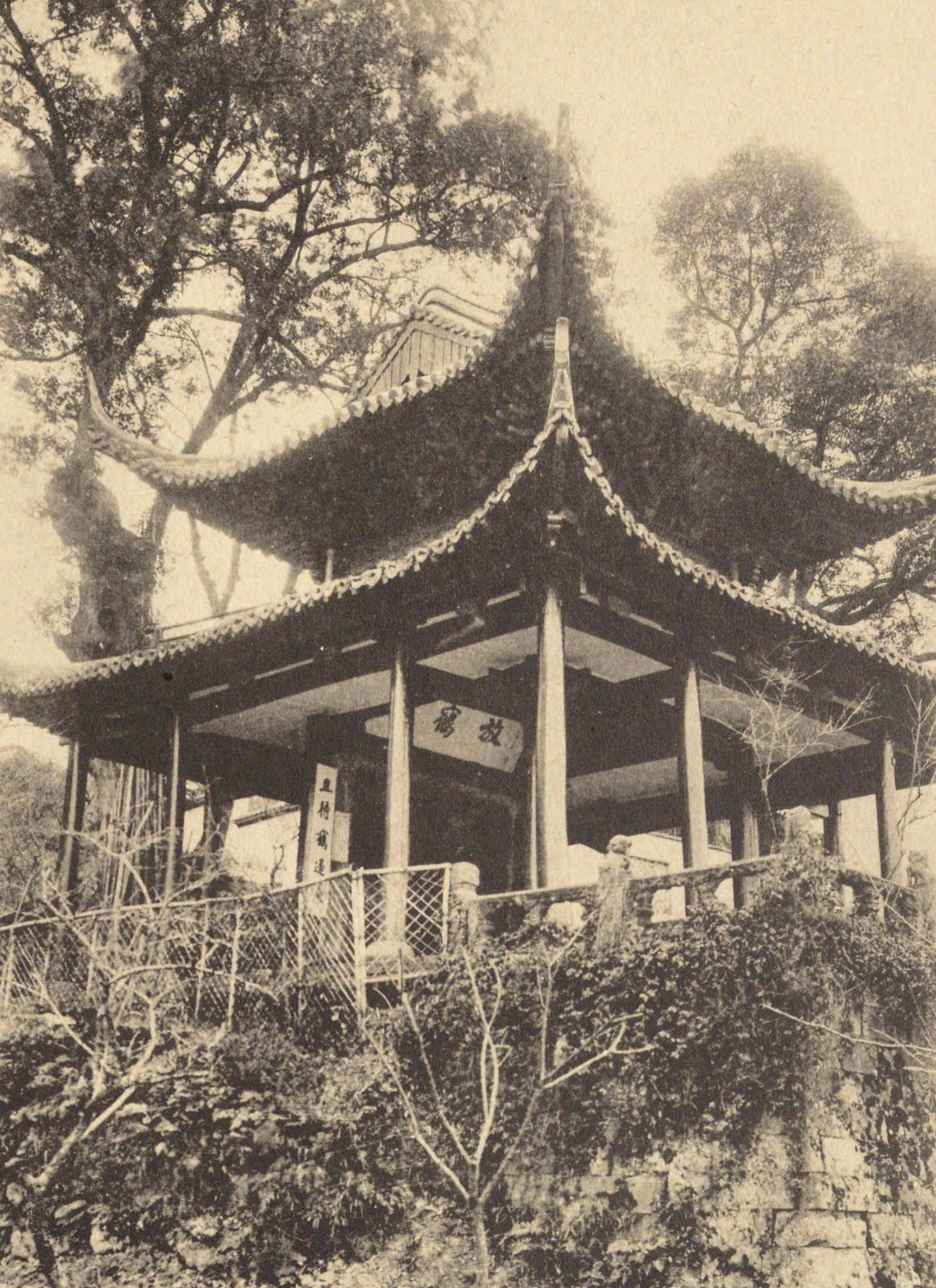
Hangzhou's Crane-Releasing Pavilion (1922)

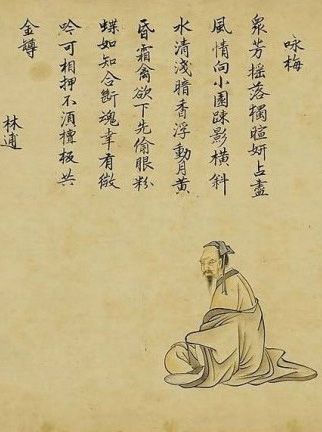
Painting of Lin Bu by Kanō Tsunenobu (18th cent.)
