= Quan Song Wen =

Chinese collection

- Edited by: Liu Lin (刘琳); Zeng Zaozhuang (曾枣庄)
- Original title
- Traditional Chinese: 全宋文
- Simplified Chinese: 全宋文
- Literal meaning: Complete Song Prose
- Hanyu Pinyin: Quán Sòng Wén
- Country: China
- Language: Chinese (mainly Classical Chinese)
- Discipline: Chinese literature
- Publisher: Shanghai Lexicographical Publishing House; Anhui Education Publishing House
- Published: 2006
- No. of books: 360

Quan Song Wen is a 360-volume Chinese collection of prose literature from the Song dynasty (960–1279), first fully published in 2006 jointly by Shanghai Lexicographical Publishing House and Anhui Education Publishing House (安徽教育出版社). More than 170,000 prose works by more than 9,000 Song dynasty prose authors are featured in the collection, and its compilation (including indexing, punctuation and necessary annotation) took more than 20 years by Sichuan University Institute for Ancient Classics and Archives (古籍整理研究所).
