= Liu Jinding =

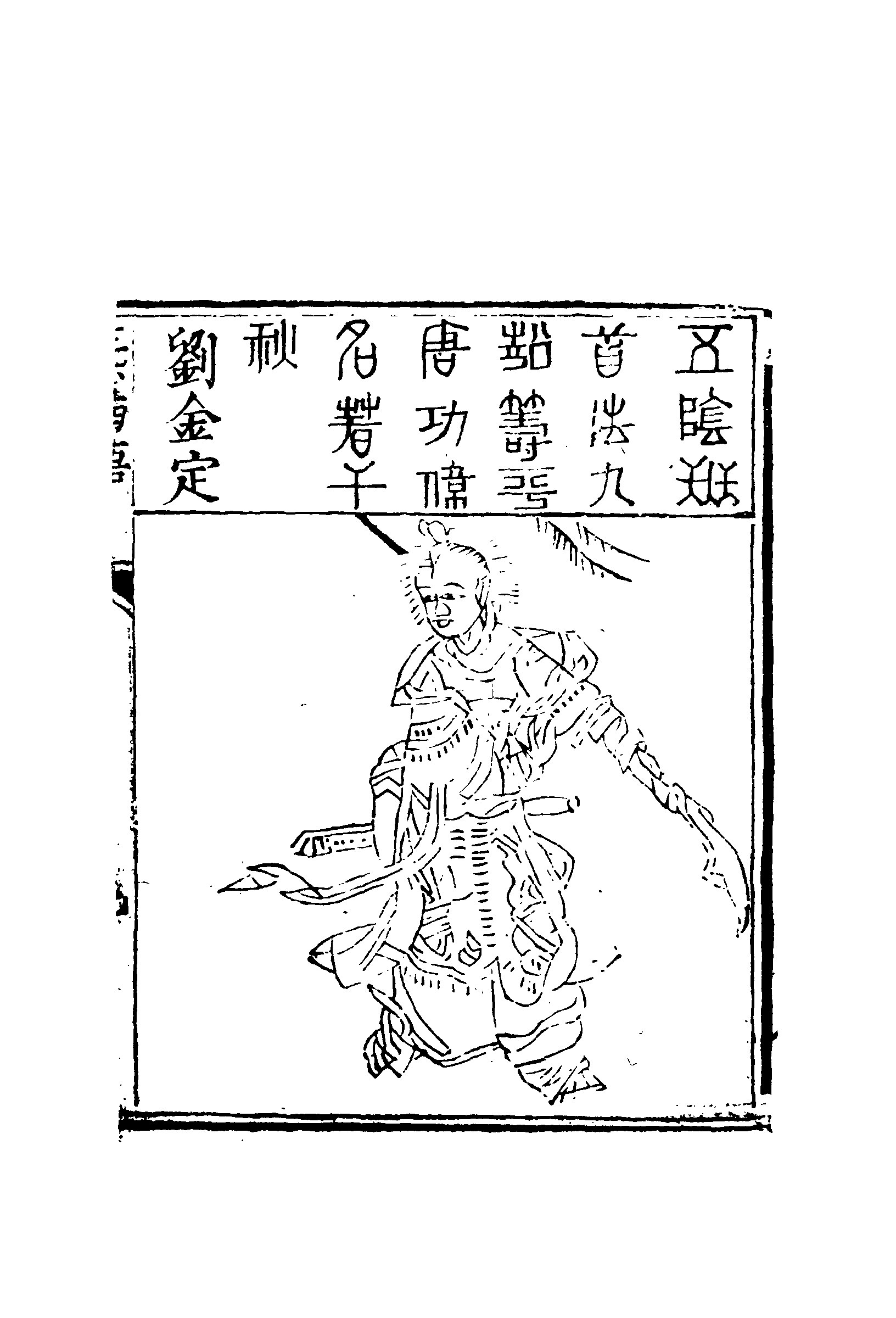
Liu Jinding

Liu Jinding (Chinese: 刘金定) is a fictional folk heroine and semi-legendary figure from the Northern Song dynasty depicted in various artistic works and traditional operas. While she is celebrated in traditional Chinese operas, folklore, and artistic works as a heroic female general from the Northern Song dynasty, there is little concrete historical evidence to confirm her existence.

She was born in Liu Village, Xiaojian Town, Mengcheng (蒙城小涧镇刘庄), and was the wife of Gao Qiong (高琼), a prominent military figure. Renowned for her bravery and military prowess, Liu Jinding was honored as a heroine by Emperor Taizu of Song, the founding emperor of the Northern Song dynasty.

Liu Jinding took part in the Northern Song military campaigns, including the siege of Shouzhou (寿州) during the war against the Southern Tang (南唐). She and her husband helped lift the siege and later supported the establishment of the Northern Song after the Chenqiao Mutiny (陈桥兵变), which brought Zhao Kuangyin (赵匡胤, Emperor Taizu) to power. Emperor Taizu appointed her Grand Marshal of the Army (兵马大元帅). Later accounts praise her for her military achievements and describe her as a heroine.
