= Lu You =

Chinese historian and poet (1125–1210)

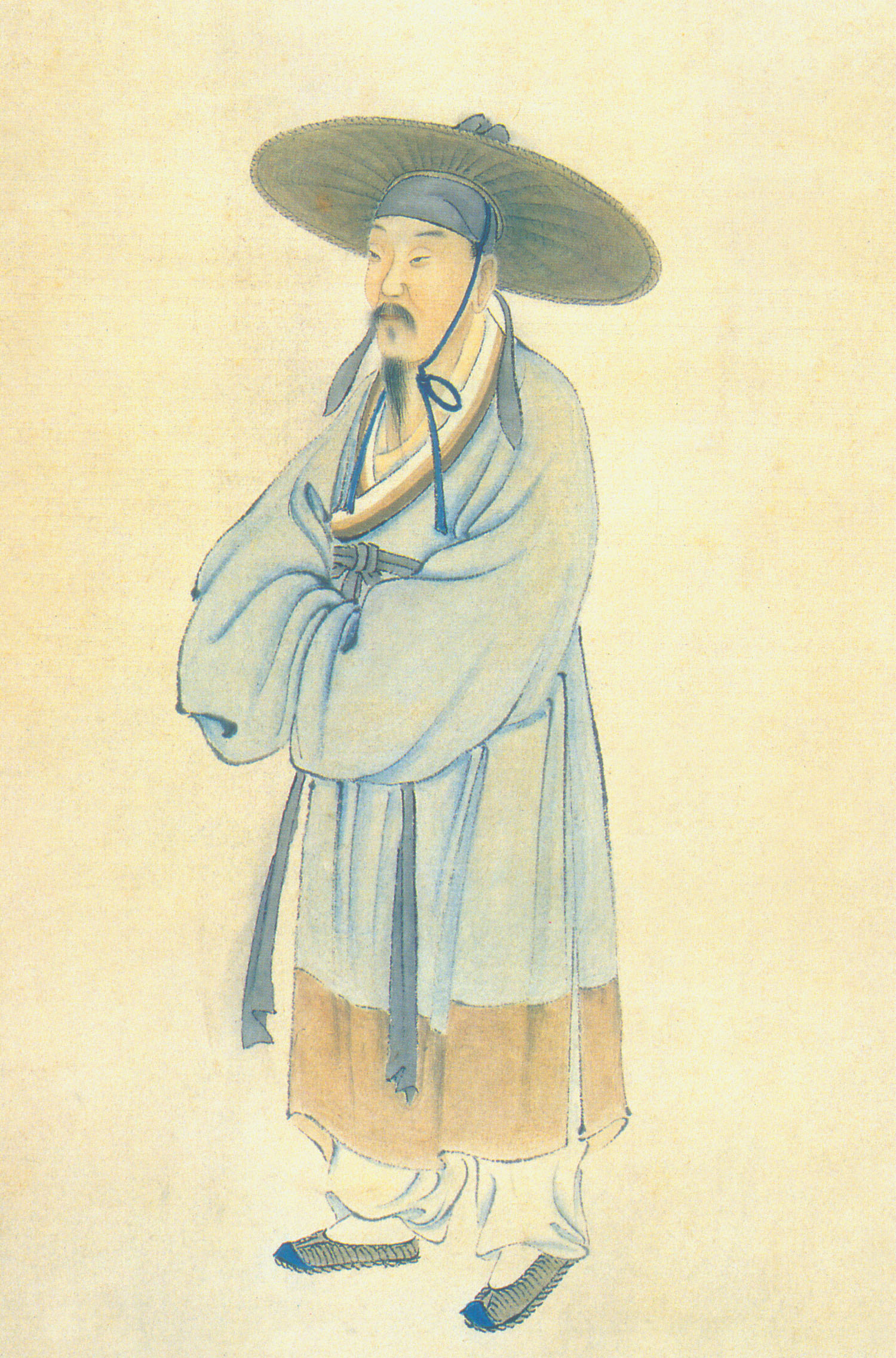
- Portrait of Lu You
- Traditional Chinese: 陸游
- Simplified Chinese: 陆游
Transcriptions
Standard Mandarin
- Hanyu Pinyin: Lù Yóu
- Wade–Giles: Lu^{4} Yu^{2}
- IPA: [lû jǒʊ]
Yue: Cantonese
- Yale Romanization: Luhk Yàuh
- Jyutping: Luk^{6} Jau^{4}
Southern Min
- Tâi-lô: Lio̍k Iû
Middle Chinese
- Middle Chinese: Ljuwk Yuw

Wuguan (courtesy name)
- Traditional Chinese: 務觀
- Simplified Chinese: 务观
Transcriptions
Standard Mandarin
- Hanyu Pinyin: Wùguàn

Fangweng (art name)
- Chinese: 放翁
Transcriptions
Standard Mandarin
- Hanyu Pinyin: Fàngwēng

Lu You (traditional Chinese: 陸游; simplified Chinese: 陆游; 1125–1210) was a Chinese historian and poet of the Southern Song Dynasty (南宋).

== Career ==
=== Early life and marriage ===
Lu You was born on a boat floating in the Wei River early on a rainy morning, November 13, 1125. At the time of his birth, China was divided and the Song dynasty in the northern part of the country had been invaded by the Jurchens of the Jin dynasty in the Jin–Song wars. The southern part of China continued to hold out as the Southern Song dynasty for another 150 years, but during Lu You's entire life, the country was threatened by invasion from the north. He is known for his many patriotic poems.

One year after his birth, the troops of the Jin dynasty conquered the capital of the Northern Song dynasty; his family fled to the south. Lu You's family included government officials, and he received a good education. He was brought up to be patriotic, and grew up determined to expel the foreign Jurchen from the North and bring about the reunification of China under the Song dynasty.

Lu You grew up with his cousin Tang Wan (唐琬, courtesy name Huixian 蕙仙, 1128-1156), who was quiet but loved literature. They fell deeply in love and were married when he was 20. But they had no children, and his mother did not like Tang Wan. Though they had lived happily together, his mother forced them to divorce in order to make Lu You concentrate on studying to fulfill his aspiration of saving the Song dynasty. In traditional Chinese culture, children were required to obey their parents. Lu You loved his mother and reluctantly divorced Tang Wan. She later married a nobleman named Zhao Shicheng (趙士程), and he married a woman from the Wang clan (her personal name eludes most researchers).

Lu You was sad after his first marriage broke up. One spring day, at age 31, eight years after their divorce, he passed by Shen's Garden (沈園) and by chance encountered Tang Wan and her husband. Tang Wan asked her husband to let her send a cup of wine to Lu You. When her hands passed the wine to him, he saw her eyes brimmed with tears. His heart was broken, and he drank the cup of bitter wine to the bottom. He turned away and on the spot wrote the poem "Phoenix Hairpin" (Chai Tou Feng, 釵頭鳳) on the wall of Shen's Garden. After this meeting with Tang Wan, Lu You went to the North to struggle against the foreign Jin dynasty, before returning to southern Shu (蜀, today's Sichuan) to pursue his dream of unifying China.

When Tang Wan read Lu You's poem in the garden, she immediately wrote one in the same form in response. Less than a year later, she died. In the year before Lu You's death, at age 85, he wrote another poem called “Shen's Garden” to commemorate Tang Wan, his first love. A traditional Yue opera was written about Lu You and Tang Wan, and their love story is very famous in China.

=== Official career ===
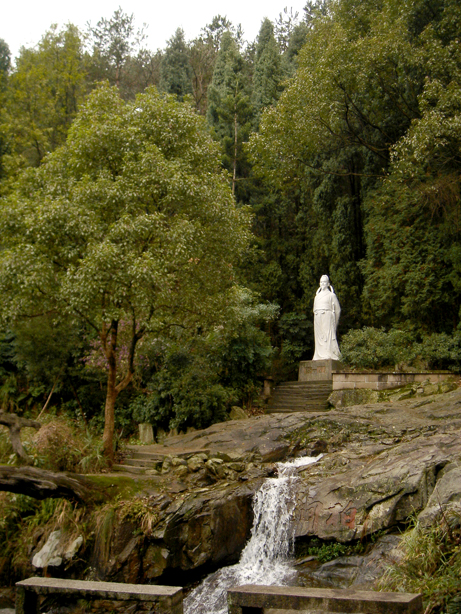
Statue of Lu You on Nanji Hill, Jiaocheng District, Ningde, Fujian

At age 12, Lu You was already an excellent writer, had mastered the skill of sword fighting, and had delved deeply into war strategy. At age 19, he took the civil service examination, but did not pass. Ten years later, he took it again; this time he not only passed it, he was the first winner in the Lin An region. But this triumph brought him trouble. Qin Sun, the grandson of the powerful Qin Hui (秦檜, a notorious aristocratic traitor in the Song Dynasty), had also taken the exam. Lu You's win threatened Qin Sun's position, as Lu You was now likely to take first place in the next year's national examination. In fact, not only Lu You, but all the potential winners of the next year's nationwide competition were excluded, along with even some of the examination officers.

After Qin Hui's death, Lu You started his official career in government. Because he avidly insisted on fighting against the Jin dynasty and did not follow the mainstream official lethargy on the subject, he was dismissed from his job. In 1172, he was hired to do strategic planning in the military. Military life opened his eyes and mind; he hoped to fulfill his aspiration of bringing a divided China back together. He wrote many unrestrained poems to express his passionate patriotism. But the Song Dynasty was by now corrupt and indolent; most officers just wanted to make a nice living; Lu You had no opportunity to deploy his talent. "Entering upon a public career by virtue of his father's services, he fell into disfavour with Qin Hui; but after the latter's death he received an appointment, and in 1163 the Emperor Xiaozong(孝宗) made him a Compiler for the Privy Council and conferred upon him the honorary degree of Jinshi(進士)."

He was unsuccessful in his official career: he adopted a patriotic irredentist stance, advocating the expulsion of the Jurchen from northern China, but this position was out of tune with the times. In 1175, Fan Chengda(范成大) asked him to join his party. They shared literary interests, and now behaved casually in official society. Lu You felt there was no place for him in official life, and started to become self-indulgent, enjoying drinking to forget his lack of success in his personal life and career pursuit. He gave himself the art name "Fangweng" (放翁), meaning "Liberated Old Man", and was sarcastic about himself in his poems.

After several promotions and demotions, Lu You retired in 1190 to live in seclusion in his hometown Shaoxing (紹興, now in Zhejiang province), then a rural area. He spent the last twenty years of his life there. Lu You enjoyed good health and liked eating pearl barley and wood ear mushrooms. This habit kept his vision and hearing keen until death. During his retirement, he still ardently supported fighting against the Jin dynasty, but without success. His wife died in 1197. On January 26, 1210, he died at age 86. His great regret was knowing that northern China was still in the control of the foreigners.

== Style ==
Lu You wrote about eleven thousand poems, in both the shi (詩) and ci (詞) forms, plus a number of prose works, which made him the poet who ranks the top in the list of numbers of the poems left before 15C. In his poetry he continues to articulate the beliefs which cost him his official career, calling for reconquest of the north. Watson identifies these works as part of the legacy of Du Fu (杜甫). Watson compares a second body of work, poems on country life and growing old, to those of Bai Juyi (白居易) and Tao Qian (陶潛).

His style can be divided into three periods.

=== First Period ===
The first Period of Lu You's works is from his teenage years to age 46. This period, although the longest, contains the fewest of his works, about two hundred poems, because he himself destroyed his early works in his later years.

=== Second Period ===
Second Period runs from age 46 to 54, including more than 2400 shi and ci. During this period, Lu You joined the military and was affected by that experience.

=== Third Period ===
The third Period runs from the time Lu You retired to his home town until his death. He did not have time to edit his work, and 6500 poems survive from this period. His work in this period includes peaceful pastoral images as well as desolation and bleakness.

Though his style changed throughout his life, his work is always full of patriotism. This is the most important feature of his poetry, and the major reason they have been valued for almost a thousand years.

=== Books ===
- 《劍南詩稿》(Jian Nan Shi Gao, the draft of poems when holding a sword in the southern borders)
- 《渭南文集》(Wei Nan Wen Ji, the collection of proses in the south of the Wei River)
- 《放翁逸稿》(Fang Weng Yi Gao, the lost drafts of the Liberated Old Man)
- 《南唐書》(Nan Tang Shu, Book of Southern Tang)
- 《老學庵筆記》(Lao Xue An Bi Ji, the notebook from the House of a Person Who Studies When He Is Old)
- 《放翁家訓》(Fang Weng Jia Xun, family precepts from the Liberated Old Man)
- 《家世舊文》(Jia Shi Jiu Wen, an old prose about the history of my family)

=== Poems ===
Lu You wrote many poems. One of his most famous is "To My Son" (示兒, Shi Er). This is how it goes:

- To My Son (示兒)

死去元知萬事空，
但悲不見九州同。
王師北定中原日，
家祭無忘告乃翁。

All turns to dust in my dying eyes,
only hatred is that a unified land is not seen.
When the day of the emperor's troops sweeping the North comes,
you must not forget to tell me at my tombstone.

He composed this last poem when he was near death.

What this poem means is that he does not mind not being able to take anything with him when he dies, but he is upset to see that China is still not united as a nation. He is telling his son that if this day ever comes, his family must not forget to go to his grave and tell him there. The poem is widely taught in Chinese schools.

- Rainstorm on the Eleventh month 4th (十一月四日風雨大作)

僵臥孤邨不自哀，
尚思爲國戍輪台。
夜闌臥聽風吹雨，
鐵馬冰河入夢來。

I slept stiff and alone in a lonely village without feeling self-pity.
I am still thinking of fighting for my country.
Deep into the night I lie down and hear the wind blowing the rain.
The armored horses and the ice river came into my dream.

This poem was written when Lu was old and retired, but it shines with his patriotism and vivid depiction of the fighting scenes in the North.

- Phoenix Hairpin (釵頭鳳)

紅酥手，黃藤酒，
滿城春色宮墻柳。
東風惡，歡情薄，
一杯愁緒，幾年離索，錯，錯，錯。

萅如舊，人空瘦，
淚痕紅浥鮫綃透。
桃花落，閒池閣，
山盟雖在，錦書難托，莫，莫，莫。

Pink soft hands, yellow rippling wine,
The town is filled with Spring, willows by palace walls.
The east wind is biting, happiness is thin,
heart full of sorrow, so many years apart.

Wrong, Wrong, Wrong!

Spring is as of old; the person is empty and thin.
Traces of tears show through the sheer silk.
Peach blossoms falling, glimmering pond freezing,
The huge oath remains, the brocade book is hard to hold.

Don't, Don't, Don't!

Note: The words "wrong" and "don't" rhyme in Chinese.

This poem is about his real love story (see his marriage). In this poem, "Biting east wind" is a metaphor for traditional Chinese view about women. This view broke up his first marriage. "Brocade book", or "glorious/bright book," is another metaphor for his ambition of unifying China. But he doesn't seem to be successful in either of them (marriage and career). He also uses antithesis, which is very popular in Chinese poetry. It matches both sound and sense in two poetic lines, like "a heart of sorrow" pairing with "years apart" and "paramount promise" pairing "brocade book". The sounds match perfectly in Chinese. This poem falls in the first period of his works.

- Plum Blossom (卜算子-咏梅)

驛外斷橋邊
寂寞開無主
已是黃昏獨自愁
更著風和雨
無意苦爭春
一任群芳妒
零落成泥碾作塵
只有香如故

Near the broken bridge outside the fortress,
I go, lonely and disoriented.
It is dusk and I am alone and anxious,
especially when the wind and rain start to blow.
I do not mean to fight for Springtime,
I would rather be alone and envied by the crowd.
I will fall down, become earth, be crushed to dust.
My glory will be same as before.

== See also ==
- Fangweng ci biannian jianzhu
- Classical Chinese poetry
- Song poetry
- Ci (poetry)
