= Qin Guan =

Chinese poet and writer (1049–c. 1100)

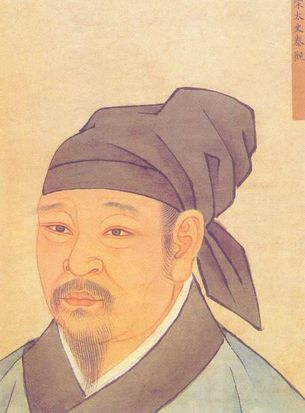
Qin Guan

Qin Guan (traditional Chinese: 秦觀; simplified Chinese: 秦观; 1049 – c. 1100) was a Chinese poet of the Song Dynasty. His courtesy name was Shaoyou (少游). Taixu (太虛) was also his courtesy name. His pseudonym was Huaihai Jushi (淮海居士) and Hangou Jushi (邗溝居士). He was honored as one of the "Four Scholars of Sumen" (蘇門四學士), along with Huang Tingjian, Zhang Lei (張耒) and Chao Buzhi (晁補之). The style of his poetry-writing is subtle, graceful, and restrained; he was famous for love-poem writing. His writing style of ci was classified into the Wanyue School, most works of which are subtle and concise. His talent was greatly appreciated by Su Shi, one of the greatest poets during the Song Dynasty. His most famous verse is, "If the two hearts are united forever, why do the two persons need to stay together—day after day, night after night?" (兩情若是久長時，又豈在朝朝暮暮 or The Weaver Girl and the Cowherd).

== See also ==
- The Weaver Girl and the Cowherd
