= Ci (poetry) =

Chinese lyrical poetic genre

Cí
- Traditional Chinese: 詞
- Simplified Chinese: 词
Transcriptions
Standard Mandarin
- Hanyu Pinyin: cí
- Gwoyeu Romatzyh: tsyh
- Wade–Giles: tzʻŭ^{2}
- IPA: [tsʰɨ̌]
Hakka
- Romanization: ci^{2}
Yue: Cantonese
- Yale Romanization: chìh
- Jyutping: ci^{4}
- IPA: [tsʰi˩]
Southern Min
- Hokkien POJ: sû
Eastern Min
- Fuzhou BUC: sṳ̀

Cí (pronounced [tsʰɨ̌]; Chinese: 詞), also known as chángduǎnjù (traditional Chinese: 長短句; simplified Chinese: 长短句; lit. 'lines of irregular lengths') and shīyú (詩餘; 诗馀; 'the poetry besides Shi'), is a type of lyric poetry in the tradition of Classical Chinese poetry that also draws upon folk traditions. Cí, also known as "song lyrics," use various poetic meters derived from a base set of fixed pattern forms, using fixed-rhythm, fixed-tone, and line-lengths varying according that of the model examples. The rhythmic and tonal pattern of the cí are based upon certain, definitive musical song tunes (cí pái), and in many cases the name of the musical tune is given in the title of a cí piece, in a form such as "after (the tune of)...."

Typically, the number of characters in each line and the arrangement of tones were determined by one of around 800 set patterns, each associated with a particular title, called cípái (詞牌). Originally, they were written to be sung to a tune of that title, with a set rhythm, rhyme, and tempo. Therefore, the title may have nothing to do with its content. Indeed, several cí often shared the same title. The titles did not refer to the content, but rather their shared rhythmic and tonal patterns. Some cí have a "subtitle" or a commentary, sometimes as long as a paragraph, indicating the content. Sometimes, for the sake of clarity, a cí is listed under its title, followed by its first line.

== History ==
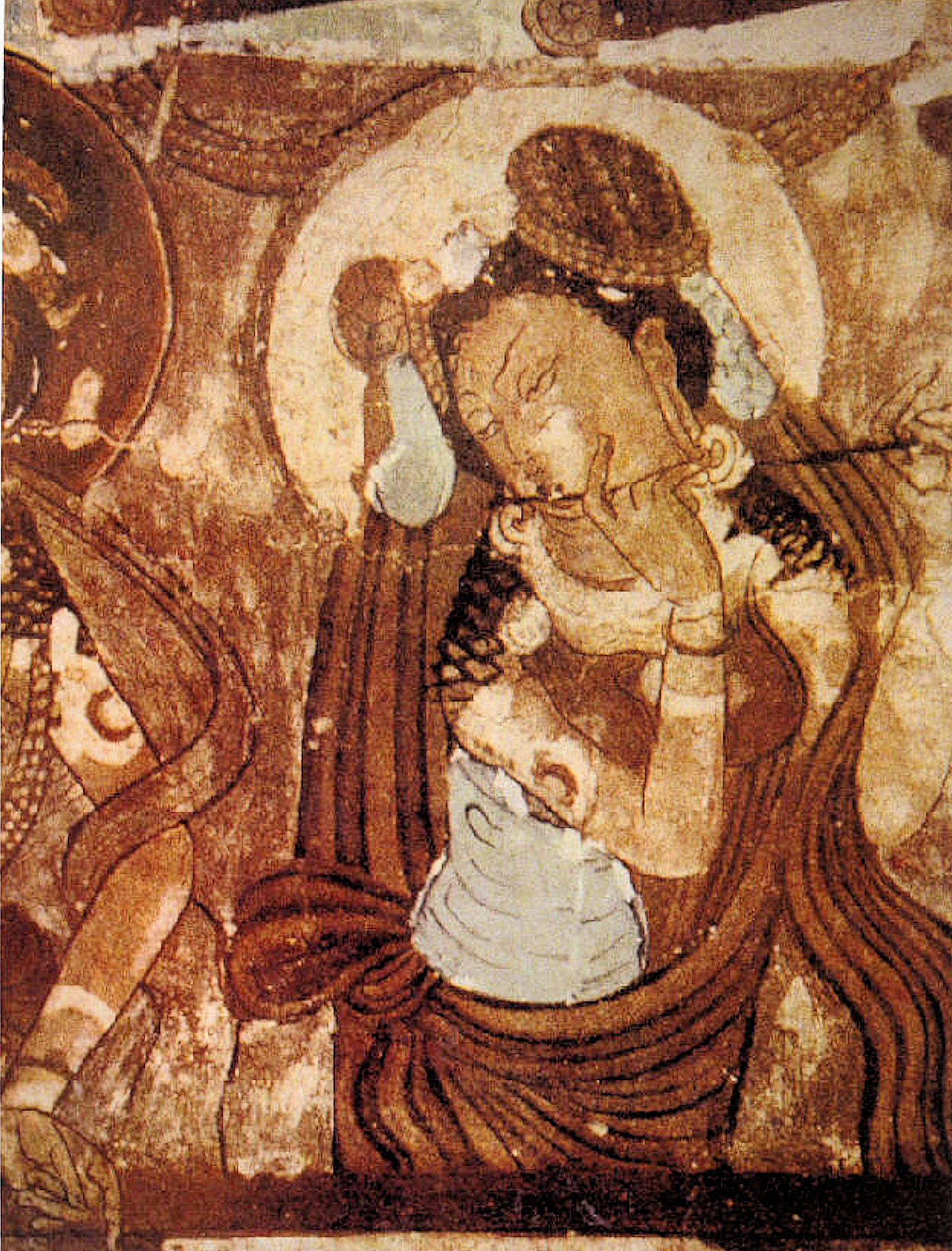
Kizil Caves, Cave 76, detail, 7th century, Kucha, depicting a type of musician influential to development of cípái

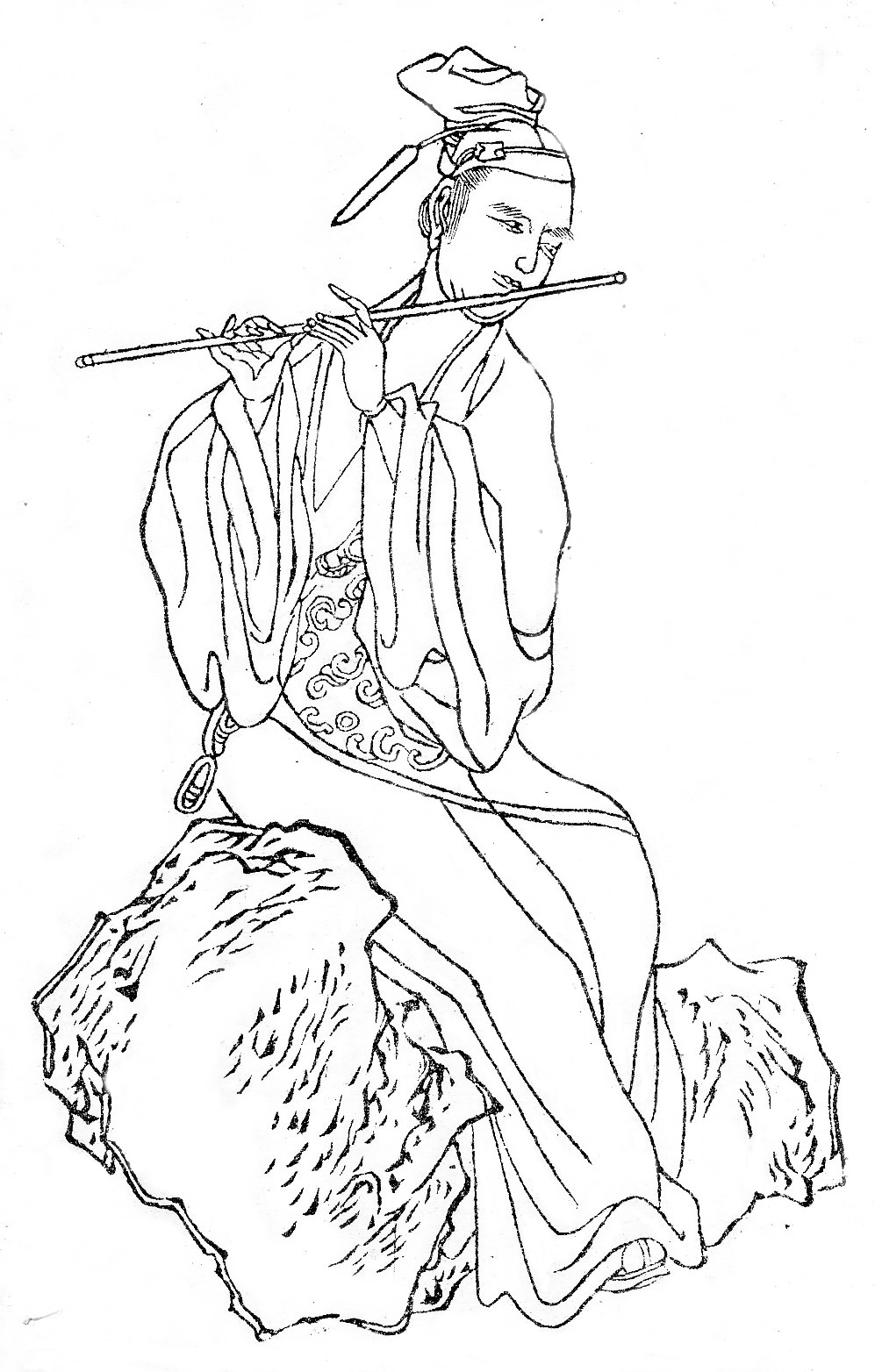
Wen Tingyun, Late Tang dynasty cí poet (among other things), from a much later time (1921)

Although the oldest surviving textual examples of cí are from 8th century CE Dunhuang manuscripts, beginning in the poetry of the Liang dynasty, the cí followed the tradition of the Shi Jing and the yuefu: they were lyrics which developed from anonymous popular songs into a sophisticated literary genre. In the case of the cí form, some of its fixed-rhythm patterns have been influenced by music and poetry of Central Asia and elsewhere.

The cí form developed during the late Tang dynasty. Although the contributions of Li Bai (701–762) are fraught with historical doubt, certainly the Tang poet Wen Tingyun (812–870) was a great master of the cí, writing it in its distinct and mature form. One of the more notable practitioners and developers of this form was Li Yu of the Southern Tang dynasty, during the Five Dynasties and Ten Kingdoms period, subsequent to Tang. Before the cí form was formalized by the scholarly, it's antecedents had grown up in a setting of popular music. Serindian influences were particularly important in this regard; with the influence of Kucha drum dance tunes being the most important. Much of the process of importing Serindian influence into Classical Chinese poetry was mediated through the short-lived state of Western Liang (555–587). Western Liang was basically a city-state centered on the city known in Tang times as Liangzhou. In Western Liang a musical hybrid of Chinese and Kuchean traditions developed, and became popularized throughout the Tang culture, from the people to even the emperor Xuanzong (reigned 713–756). This was part of a larger movement: "...of all the specialists of ambiguous social status who were sent to China by a foreign government, the most popular and influential were the musicians―instrumentalists, singers, and dancers―and the instruments and musical modes that they brought with them....For many centuries, the music of the West had had its admirers in China, but under the Sui [581–618] emperors there was a great vogue for it, which continued into T'ang times." Foreign music (in terms of performers, instruments, musical modes, and songs) was brought to China, often as a result of wars of conquest or as a type of "tribute" and this music found a place in informal settings at the imperial court to other less reputable settings. Ci poetry largely developed during the late Tang from the music made in popular settings such as houses of pleasure and from the inclusion of romantic and erotic themes of late Tang poets such as Li Shangyin.

However, thecí form of Classical Chinese poetry is especially associated with the poetry of the Song dynasty, during which it was indeed a popular poetic form. A revival of the cí poetry form occurred during the end of the Ming dynasty and the beginning of the Qing dynasty which was characterized by an exploration of the emotions connected with romantic love together with its secularization, often in a context of a brief poetic story narrative within a cí poem or a linked group of cí poems in an application of the chuanqi form of short story tales to poetry.

== Classification ==
=== Song ===
During the Song dynasty (960–1279), two main categories of cí employed were xiǎolìng (小令; the original form since pre-Song) and màncí (慢詞; starting with Liu Yong), depending on the song being either short and in fast tempo or long and in slow tempo. Most xiǎolìng were written in the pre-Song era.

=== Ming and Qing ===
Later, during the Ming (1368–1644) and Qing (1644–1912) dynasties, the cí, or rather the cípái, became classified for the number of characters it dictates. It is called

1. xiǎolìng 小令 if it is no more than 58 characters,
2. zhōngdiào 中調 for 59–90 characters, and
3. chángdiào 長調 for over 90 characters.

If the cí appears in one stanza, it is called dāndiào (單調). The largest majority is shuāngdiào (雙調) with two stanzas or què (闋) in identical or nearly identical patterns. There also are rare cases of sāndié (三疊) and sìdié (四疊), for three and four qüè, respectively. In terms of style, cí can also be classified as either wǎnyuē (婉約; "grace") or háofàng (豪放; "bold").

== Formation ==
There are four main tones in Mandarin Chinese, though a fifth ("neutral") tone may be considered. The tonal systems of past centuries were different. The term "tonal contour" is used to indicate that these tones are not tones in the sense of absolute musical pitches, but rather in terms of the overall relative "shape" of the tones as spoken or chanted.

The four tones of Middle Chinese were first described by Shen Yue around AD 500. They were the "level" (平; píng), "rising" (上; shǎng), "departing" (去; qù), and "entering" (入; rù) tones. The level is classified as 平; píng; all three other tones (rising, departing and entering) are classified as oblique 仄; zè. So, in any cipai, the formation of Ci, each Chinese character in Ci will be required in detailed tones with 平仄; píngzè, shown using 平 and 仄.

== Cipai ==
Cipai (Chinese: 词牌), also called Cige and Cidiao, is the name of various formations of Ci. Most cípái consist of three characters. The literal meaning of a cípái can be rather obscure, making it difficult to translate. Some are taken straight from earlier poems, and some are clearly of Non-Han origin—mostly songs introduced from Central Asia. Some cípái have alternative names, usually taken from a famous piece of that very cípái. There also are variants of certain cípái, indicated by a prefix or a suffix. The formations of Ci are complicated, in different names of cípái, the number of characters, syntactical structure, tones and rhyme are also different.

Cipai developed from the musical culture of the Tang dynasty and became closely associated with the rise of ci poetry. Early ci were written as song lyrics to existing melodies, and the names of these melodies gradually became fixed as cipai.

As the melodies themselves gradually disappeared from common use, the cipai remained as formal poetic patterns. Later poets continued to write ci according to inherited cipai, even when the original music was no longer known.

For example, choosing the cípái Jiang Chengzi (江城子; "Riverside City"), the tone requirements of each character in this cipai is following:

仄平平仄仄平平。
仄平平，仄平平。
仄仄平平，仄仄仄平平。
仄仄平平平仄仄，
平仄仄，仄平平。

平平仄仄仄平平。
仄平平，仄平平。
仄仄平平，仄仄仄平平。
仄仄平平平仄仄，
平仄仄，仄平平。

The following is a cí poem based on Jiang Chengzi.

Original Chinese

十年生死兩茫茫，
不思量，自難忘。
千里孤墳，無處話淒涼。
縱使相逢應不識，
塵滿面，鬢如霜。

夜來幽夢忽還鄉，
小軒窗，正梳妝。
相顧無言，唯有淚千行。
料得年年斷腸處，
明月夜，短松岡。

Pinyin

Shí nián shēng sǐ liǎng máng máng
bù sī liáng, zì nán wàng.
Qiānlǐ gū fén, wú chù huà qī liáng.
Zòng shǐ xiāng féng yìng bù shí,
chén mǎn miàn, bìn rú shuāng.

Yè lái yōu mèng hū huán xiāng,
xiǎo xuān chuāng, zhèng shū zhuāng.
Xiāng gù wúyán, wéi yǒu lèi qiān xíng.
Liào dé nián nián duàn cháng chù,
míng yuè yè, duǎn sōnggāng.

English translation

Ten boundless years now separate the living and the dead.
I have not often thought of her, but neither can I forget.
Her lonely grave is a thousand li distant, I can't say where my wife lies cold.
We could not recognise each other even if we met again,
My face is all but covered with dust, my temples glazed with frost.

In deepest night, a sudden dream returns me to my homeland.
She sits before a little window, and sorts her dress and make-up.
We look at each other without a word, a thousand lines of tears.
Must it be that every year I'll think of that heart-breaking place,
Where the moon shines brightly in the night, and bare pines guard the tomb.

Su Shi, 蘇軾,《江城子·十年生死兩茫茫》

In the title of this cí, Jiang Chengzi (江城子; "Riverside City") is the name of cípái. Su Shi was married when he was 19, and his wife was 16. His wife died when she was only 27. Because of his government duties, Su Shi moved to many different places in China, all far away from his hometown. One night in early 1075, about 10 years after her death, Su Shi dreamed of his wife, then composed this famous cí.

== Famous cí poets ==
=== Tang, Five Dynasties, Ten Kingdoms ===
- Wen Tingyun (812–870)
- Wei Zhuang (836–910)
- Li Cunxu (885–926)
- Gu Xiong (fl. 928)
- Lu Qianyi (fl. 931)
- Yan Xuan (fl. 932)
- Mao Xizhen (fl. 947)
- Xue Zhaoyun (10th century)
- Sun Guangxian (d. 968)
- Li Yu (937–978)

=== Song ===
- Liu Yong (987–1053)
- Ouyang Xiu (1007–1072)
- Su Shi (1037–1101)
- Song Ci (1186–1249)
- Huang Tingjian (1045–1105)
- Qin Guan (1049–1100)
- Zhou Bangyan (1056–1121)
- Li Qingzhao (1081–1149?)
- Lu You (1125–1209)
- Xin Qiji (1140–1207)
- Jiang Kui (1155–1221)
- Wang Yisun (1240?–1290?)
- Fan Zhongyan (989-1052)

=== Post-Song ===
- Gao Bing (1350–1423)
- Qian Qianyi (1582–1664)
- Wu Weiye (1609–1671)
- Gong Dingzi (1615–1673)
- Chen Weisong (陈维崧 1626–1682)
- Zhu Yizun (1629–1709)
- Nalan Xingde (1655–1685)
- Mao Zedong (1893–1976)

== See also ==
- Classical Chinese poetry forms
- Dan dan you qing
- Shui diao ge tou
- Song poetry
