= Women in ancient and imperial China =

Women in ancient and Imperial China were restricted from participating in various realms of social life, through social stipulations that they remain indoors, whilst outside business should be conducted by men. The strict division of the sexes, apparent in the policy that "men plow, women weave" (Chinese: 男耕女織), partitioned male and female histories as early as the Zhou dynasty, with the Rites of Zhou (written at the end of the Warring States Period), even stipulating that women be educated specifically in "women's rites" (Chinese: 陰禮; pinyin: yīnlǐ). Though limited by policies that prevented them from owning property, taking examinations, or holding office, their restriction to a distinctive women's world prompted the development of female-specific occupations, exclusive literary circles, whilst also investing certain women with certain types of political influence inaccessible to men.

Women had greater freedom during the Tang dynasty, and a woman, Wu Zetian, ruled China for several decades. However, the status of women declined from the Song dynasty onward, which has been blamed on the rise of neo-Confucianism, and restrictions on women became more pronounced. A number of practices, such as footbinding and widow chastity became common.

The study of women's history in the context of imperial China has been pursued for many years. The societal status of both women and men in ancient China was closely related to the Chinese kinship system.

== Ancient China ==
Received Chinese historiography about ancient China was edited heavily by Confucian scholars in the 4th century BCE, who aimed to show that the dynastic system of government extended as far back into the past as possible. These texts, like the Zuo zhuan and Classic of Poetry, focus on male nobles and scholars, with infrequent references to women. One exception is Biographies of Exemplary Women, compiled in the 1st century BCE as a collection of cautionary tales for men, highlighting the advantages of virtuous women, as well as the dangers posed by loose ones. The majority of women included were members of the nobility and were generally depicted as passive, with their male guardians (husbands or fathers) controlling their actions. The marital division of labor of "men plow, women weave" is expected to widen the gap in power of household decision-making in favor of men, keeping women in a subordinate position. In contrast, archaeological remains from pre-Confucian periods show that women played active roles at all levels of society.

=== Neolithic ===
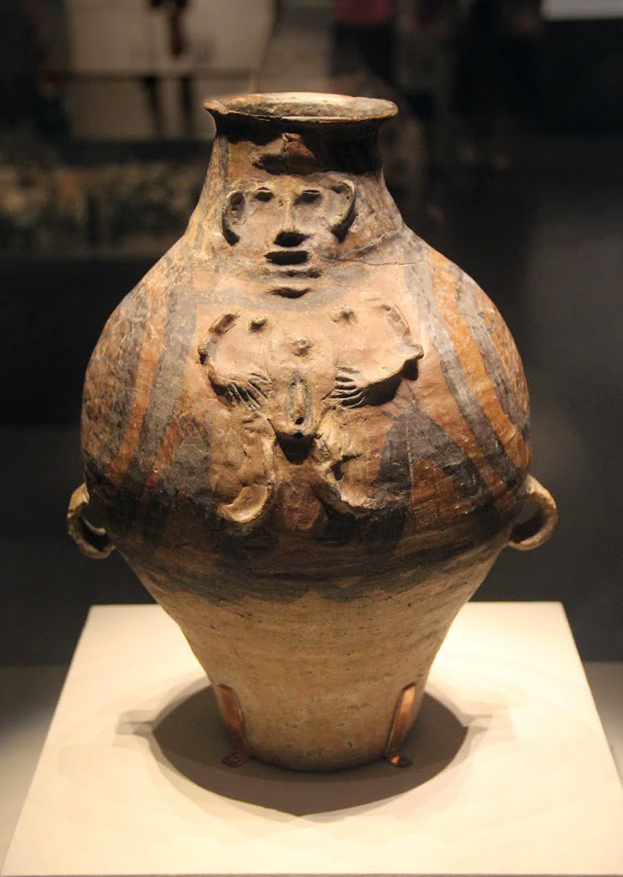
Vessel from the Majiayao culture decorated with a female-male figure.

Neolithic society in China is perceived to be matrilineal, with patrilineal societies becoming dominant later with the rise of pastoralism and the first social division of labor. This originates from Marxist theories of historical materialism, which argue that social structure is determined by the economy. The fact that burials of both women and men of the Yangshao culture have grave goods, even though each had different types of items, was used to show that Marx's first great social division of labor had not occurred, thus the Yangshao culture is presumed to have been matrilineal. This assumption continues to be influential in modern archaeology.

Female figurines representing either goddesses or fertility symbols have been found at several sites of the Hongshan culture in Liaoning province, as well as the Xinglongwa culture in eastern Inner Mongolia. These figures are posed with their hands resting on their large bellies and, as the Niuheliang figure was found inside a temple, this supports the idea that they were worshipped. The division between female and male was also likely less rigid in the Neolithic than in later periods, as demonstrated by a vessel from the Majiayao culture site of Liupingtai (Chinese: 六平台) in Qinghai. The figure on the pot has both male and female genitalia, leading archaeologists to argue that the genders combined were considered to be powerful, perhaps as a precursor to later yin and yang philosophy.

Women buried at sites belonging to the Majiayao culture are often accompanied by spindle whorls, suggesting that weaving was an important occupation. When a male and female were buried together, they lay next to each other in the same positions, suggesting no difference in social status. By the Qijia culture, the woman is found buried outside of the main coffin along with the grave goods, as at Liuwan in Ledu, Qinghai. This suggests that the women were being treated as possessions of the men buried in the main grave. The left leg of one female in a double burial was even caught beneath the coffin lid, which archaeologists suggest indicates that she was buried alive. The Lower Xiajiadian culture cemetery of Dadianzi (Chinese: 大甸子) in the north contained equal numbers of men and women, suggesting that both were given equal burial rites. In addition, the women's average age at death was slightly higher than the men's, which indicates that they lived longer. This contrasts with the pattern at other cemeteries of the same period, where fewer women received formal burial.

=== Shang dynasty ===
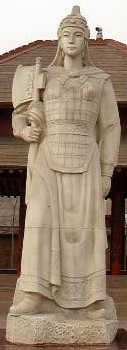
Statue of Fu Hao by a modern artist.

Women's status varied between regions during the Shang dynasty. While Shang dynasty women are thought to have been considered lower in status to men, archaeological excavations of burials have shown that women not only could reach high status but that they also exercised political power. The tomb of Fu Hao, consort of King Wu Ding, contained precious jade objects and ritual bronze vessels, demonstrating her wealth. In addition, texts from the Shang dynasty have been excavated that record Fu Hao leading troops into battle to the north of Shang territories, conquering states, leading services to worship ancestors, and assisting in political affairs at court. After her death, Fu Hao was honored by later rulers as Ancestor Xin and given sacrifices to ensure she remained benevolent.

Ordinary women in the Shang society also played key roles in daily life, producing textiles, preparing food, and managing household economies. Some women participated in religious rituals as assistants or minor priestesses, showing that spiritual and ceremonial roles were not limited to elite figures.

The topics of the oracle bones suggest that the Shang preferred male children, as the question posed to one bone was whether Fu Hao's pregnancy would be good. The bone records that the pregnancy was, "not good; [the child] was a girl." In addition, male rulers were allowed to marry several wives in order to improve their chances of having male children. Fu Hao was, thus, referred to as consort, whereas Fu Jing (Chinese: 婦井) was also the first wife.

Despite the preference for male heirs, elite women like Fu Hao could exercise significant influence, while other wives and daughters often contributed indirectly to political or economic affairs through household management, religious activities, and arranging alliances through marriage.

=== Zhou dynasty ===
By the Zhou dynasty, Chinese society was decidedly patriarchal, with female and male social roles determined by a strict, feudal hierarchy. The foundation for enforced division of women and men in later times appeared during the Eastern Zhou or Spring and Autumn period, when mohists and legalists began to espouse the advantages to each sex performing stereotypical work roles; in theory, such a division guaranteed morality and social order. Well-ordered gender relations gradually came to be expressed in the phrase, "men plow, women weave," (Chinese: 男耕女織). This division expanded to create social separation between men and women. The Book of Changes states that, "among family members, women's proper place is inside and man's proper place is outside." The written sources indicate that women were increasingly confined to enforce this gender separation, with women of lower social status expected to return home when not engaged in unavoidable work outside. Noblewomen enjoyed the luxury of not having to work outside and their family's ability to sequester them from the male gaze became an indication of their status.

Transmitted texts give a general impression of how literate, mainly male, Zhou people perceived women. They indicate that male children were preferred, with female children seen as less valuable to the family collective than males. Up to age 9, a female child might receive the same education as a male, however, at age 10, girls were expected to study the Three Obediences and Four Virtues; 'obediences' refers to the expectation that she would first obey her father, then her husband, then her sons after her husband's death. After marriage, women were expected to live with their husband's family and demonstrate filial piety towards his parents as if they were her own. The custom of the groom's family financially compensating the bride's family for losing her can be traced back to the Zhou dynasty as set out in the Six Rites.

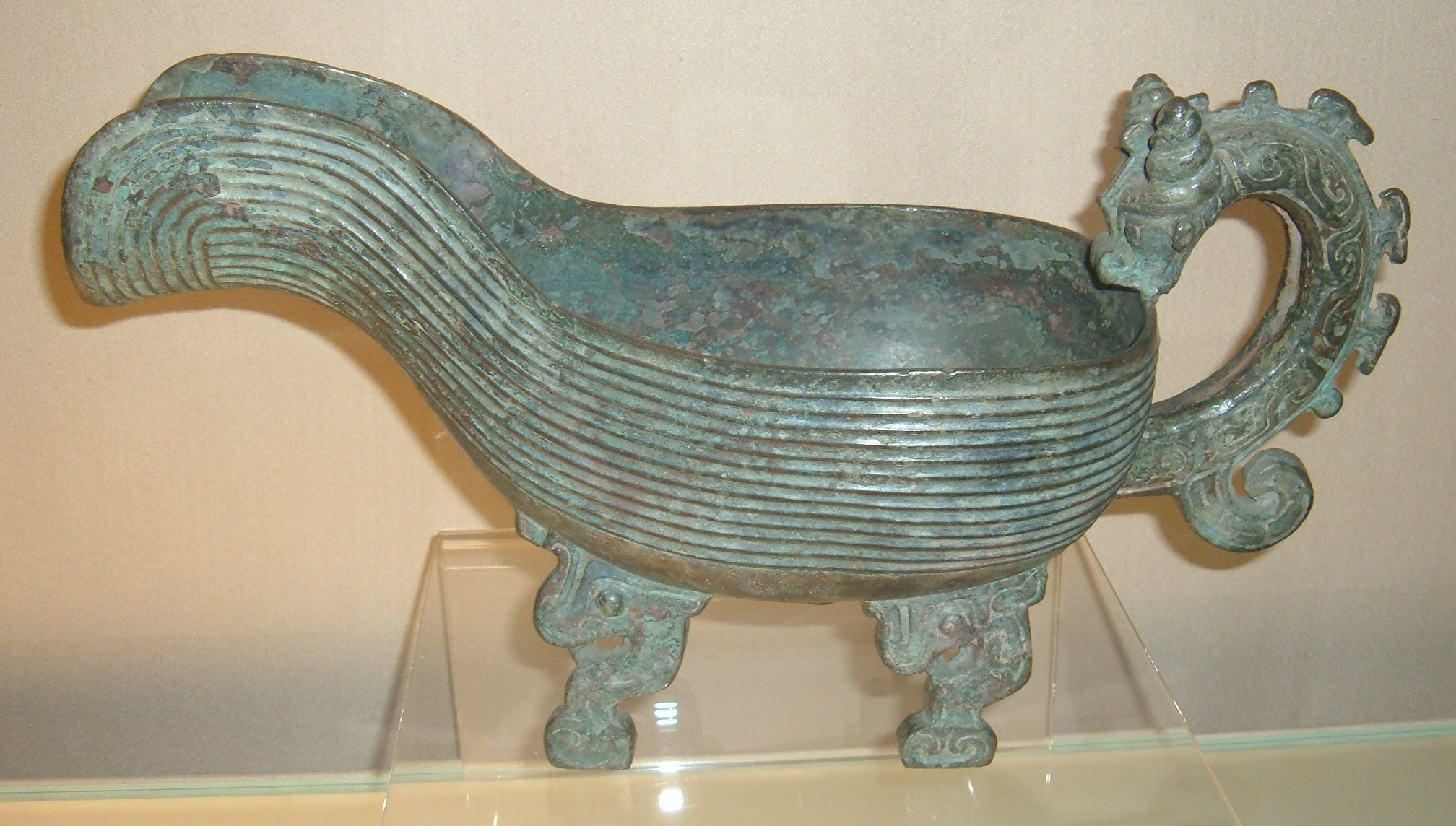
A bronze yi-vessel cast by a Marquis for his wife, Mengji (孟姬), a princess of Guo.

The specifications of the Zhou ritual texts regarding women were not always followed. For example, the cemetery of the Marquises of Jin in Shanxi contained 19 joint burials of the Jin lords and their wives. Based on the rich burial goods, archaeologists have suggested that women's status was closer to that of the men during the 10th century BC, potentially because the Zhou dynasty rituals were not yet strictly implemented. In burials from the early 9th century, however, the quantity of bronze vessels accompanying the wives decreases markedly, suggesting that the ritual system dictating a wife's subordination to her husband was in place. The burial of a Jin lord dating to the 8th century BCE, in contrast, is smaller than either tomb of his two wives, an act explicitly forbidden by the texts. This demonstrates the waning power of the Zhou government, as well as the variability in the levels of application of the rituals.

There are records of women during this period advising male relatives on political strategy, defending themselves against harsh legal sentences, teaching noblemen how to shoot arrows correctly, admonishing their ruler for unacceptable behaviour, and composing poetry. There is also a record of King Wu of Zhou appointing his wife Yi Jiang (Chinese: 邑姜) as one of his nine ministers.

=== Spring and Autumn period ===
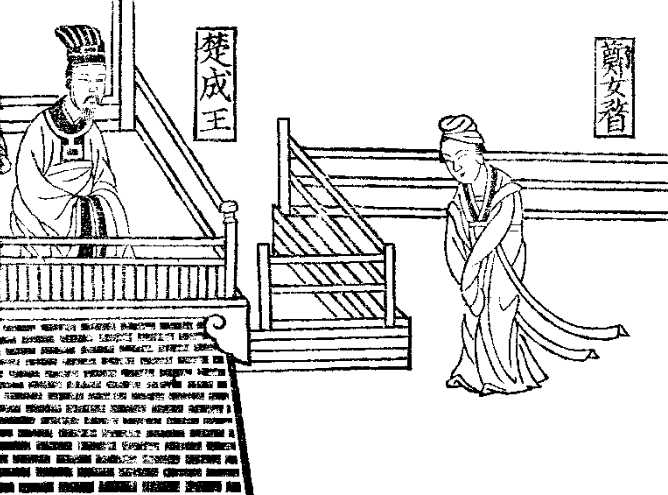
Qing dynasty woodblock print of Zheng Mao advising King Cheng of Chu on the succession.

The decline of the Zhou dynasty's power heralded a period where its feudal states became increasingly independent and powerful in their own right. Philosophies that dictated how the world should be ordered became particularly abundant in this period of unrest, the majority of which emphasized women's inferiority to their male counterparts. The Book of Rites dictates that a woman should be married by 20 or, "if there is a problem, be married by 23." Despite this, female relatives of rulers played key roles in diplomacy. For example, two wives of Duke Wen of Zheng personally visited King Cheng of Chu to thank him after he sent military aid to Zheng.

In spite of social rules that the sexes should be segregated, women were in charge of events held in their home (the domestic sphere), even if social rules meant that they should not appear to be. Even for meetings that were restricted to males, the woman of the house is often recorded as keeping a watchful eye on events. In one case, a minister of Jin requested that his wife assess his colleagues during a drinking party from behind a screen; his wife then gave the minister advice on the personalities of his guests. Similarly, a minister of Cao allowed his wife to observe a meeting between himself and Chong'er of Jin. She judged that Chong'er would become an exceptional leader, however, the ruler of Cao Duke Gong treated Chong'er with disrespect. After his reinstatement, Chong'er invaded Cao. The evidence, therefore, suggests that women were closely involved with important political and social events, serving as advisers, planners, and providers of food.

Recorded professions for women of lower social classes in this period include weavers, cooks, and musical performers. However, the majority of textual and archaeological evidence concerns upper-class women, which makes it difficult to reconstruct the lives of everyday people.

== Imperial China ==
=== Qin dynasty ===
Confucian teachings supported patrilineality and patrilocality; however, the teachings were not followed to the letter in daily life. Within the lands belonging to the former state of Qin, it was common practice for poor families to avoid the obligation of granting a son a share in the family property on attaining adulthood by sending him to live with his wife's family. Such a practice was looked down upon by the upper classes and men living with their wives' families were targeted in the 214 BCE purge of undesirables. They were rounded up and dispatched to help in the Qin expansion south, then made to settle in areas around Fuzhou and Guilin. Hinsch has argued that the practice of matrilocal residence was likely very common among the lower classes throughout imperial Chinese history, as poor men could use it to improve their prospects, while the woman's family property would not have to be divided among various relatives.

=== Han dynasty ===
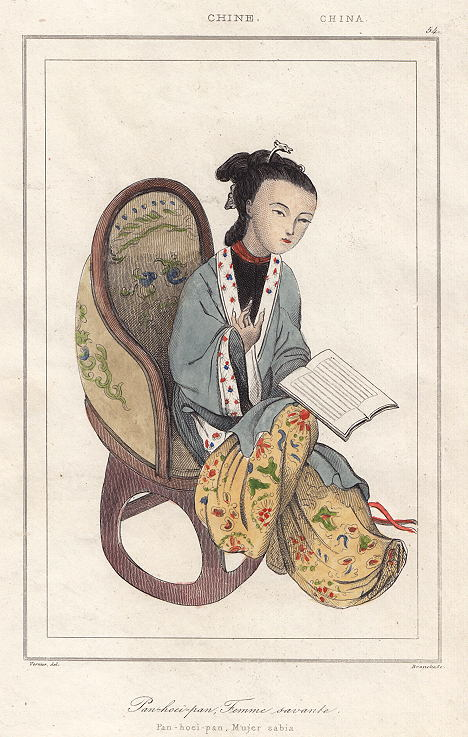
19th century illustration of Ban Zhao reading.

Records testify to women exercising authority through their families. The excavation of a married couple's tomb in Yizheng, Jiangsu, unearthed the husband's, Zhu Ling (Chinese: 朱凌), will. He recalls that, after the death of his father, his mother returned to her natal family and raised him there. Although Confucian teachings dictated that a son should be raised by the father's family, the fact that this did not happen suggests that the emphasis on patrilineality was less strong in the Han. In addition, Zhu's mother's family seems to have attracted multiple new sons-in-law to their home through the mother's marriages. Matrilocal marriages were relatively common in the Han period, though in some states more than others. For instance, in the state of Qin, a son would be given a share of the family property on coming of age, but this was not always an option for impoverished families, who often opted to send their son to live with his wife's family. These men were referred to as 'pawned sons-in-law' (Chinese: 贅婿; pinyin: zhuìxù) and were barred by Qin law from holding government office. For common people, however, there was no strong prejudice against the practice, as Zhu's mother easily attracted two new husbands. In spite of Confucian dogma that praised widows who did not remarry, remarrying multiple times was common, as is recorded in other Han texts. In the case of Zhu's will, its actual dispensation was dictated by his mother, not Zhu himself. The mother describes in the will that she bought two fields of mulberry and two of paddy that she entrusted to her daughters, Xianjun (Chinese: 仙君) and Ruojun (Chinese: 弱君), who were poor (presumably married into other families). This indicates a continued connection between a woman and her natal family during the Han, as well as the option for women to buy and work land. However, Xianjun and Ruojun could not hold onto the land permanently, as it was to be given to a younger brother on his release from penal labor.

The scholar Ban Zhao, author of Lessons for Women, describes 'womanly virtue' (Chinese: 女德; pinyin: nüde) as requiring no, "brilliant talent or remarkable difference. Womanly language need not be clever in disputation or sharp in conversation."

The taxation systems during the Western and Eastern Han stipulated that both women and men between the ages of 15 - 56 should pay taxes. As a result, women could own and manage property in their own right. Documents record that peasant women were assigned 20 mu of land, whilst taxes were set according to the baseline of a husband and wife unit. Married couples were taxed one bolt of silk and 30 dou of millet, while the taxes for unmarried women and men were adjusted so that four people paid the equivalent of one married couple. In 604, Emperor Yang of Sui altered the system so that only males could hold property and pay taxes on it.

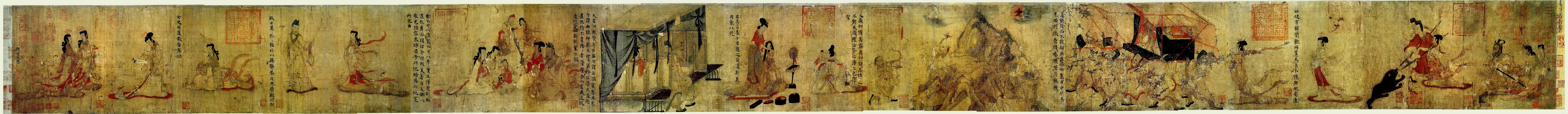
The Admonitions Scroll of the Jin dynasty (266–420), with texts providing advice to the women of the imperial court.

After the Han dynasty during the Three Kingdoms period, the writer Fu Xuan wrote a poem, bemoaning the status of women. The poem begins: "How sad it is to be a woman! Nothing on earth is held so cheap." Fu Xuan was a Confucian, however, the low status of women is commonly described in relation to Confucianism adopted during the Han dynasty.

=== Tang dynasty ===
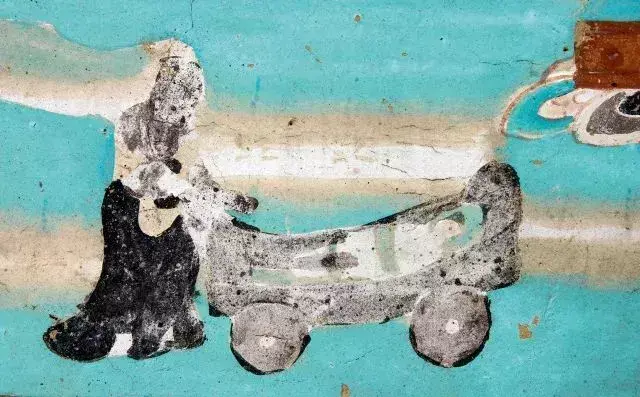
A woman pushing a baby carriage, late Tang dynasty, Mogao caves 156

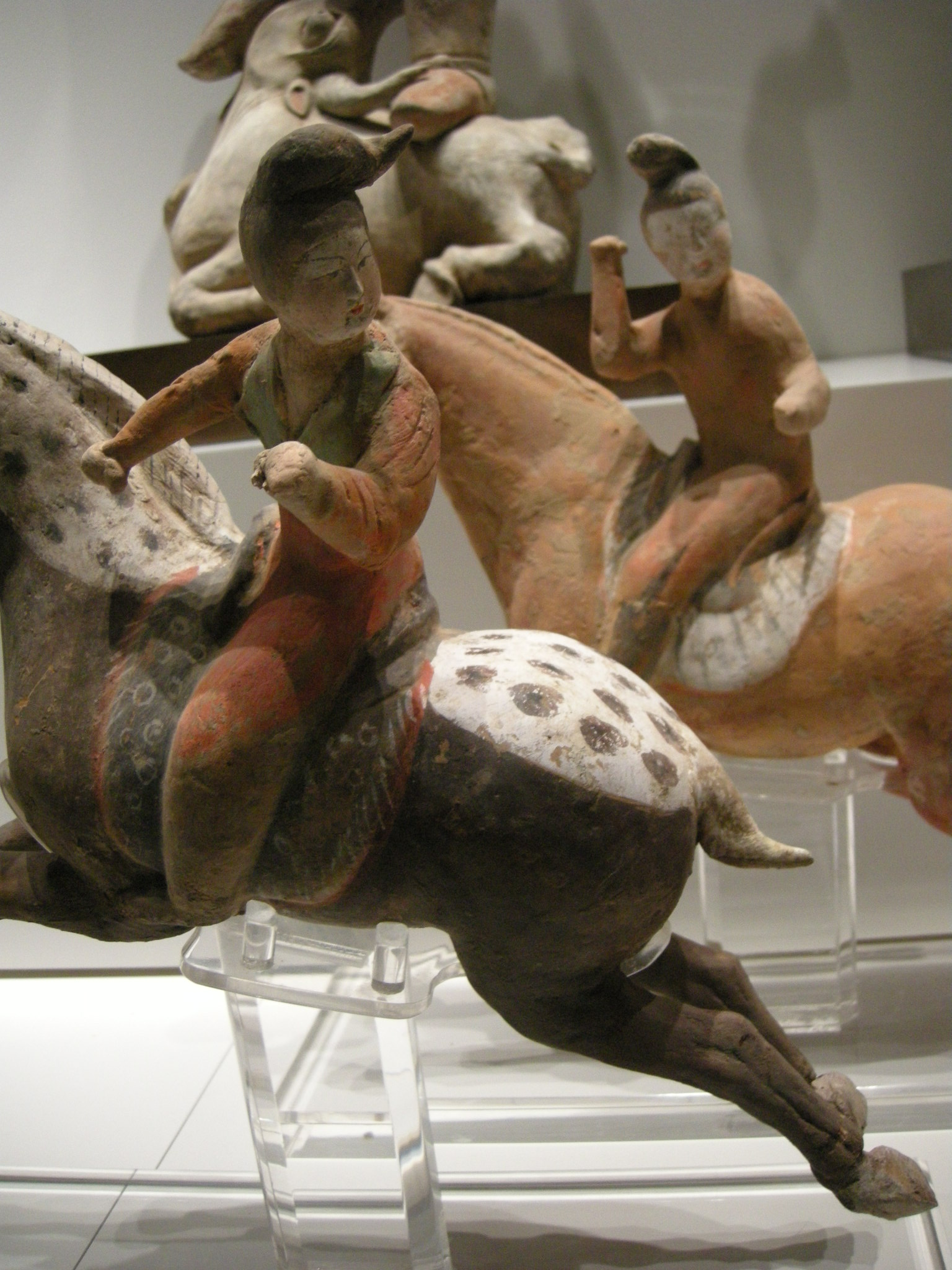
Ceramic models of Tang women playing polo and wearing trousers.

The Tang dynasty has been described as a golden age for women, in contrast to the Neo-Confucianism of the later Song dynasty that saw practices like foot-binding, widow suicide, and widow chastity become socially normative. This image of women's freedom comes from the fact that the Tang Empire was governed by several powerful women for half a century. Wu Zetian rose from the position of Emperor Gaozong's concubine to govern the country in various roles, first as his empress consort, later as regent for his heir, before declaring herself empress regnant (Chinese: 皇帝) of a new Zhou dynasty in 690. Other major female players in politics at this time included her secretary Shangguan Wan'er, Princess Taiping, and Empress Wei. Attitudes towards women could be derisive, however, as demonstrated in diplomacy between the Tang rulers with female sovereigns of other states. Emperor Taizong famously told the ambassador from Queen Seondeok of Silla that he would solve the problem of her aggressive neighbors by sending a Tang prince to rule Silla, reasoning that the kingdoms of Baekje and Goguryeo were clearly emboldened by facing a female monarch.

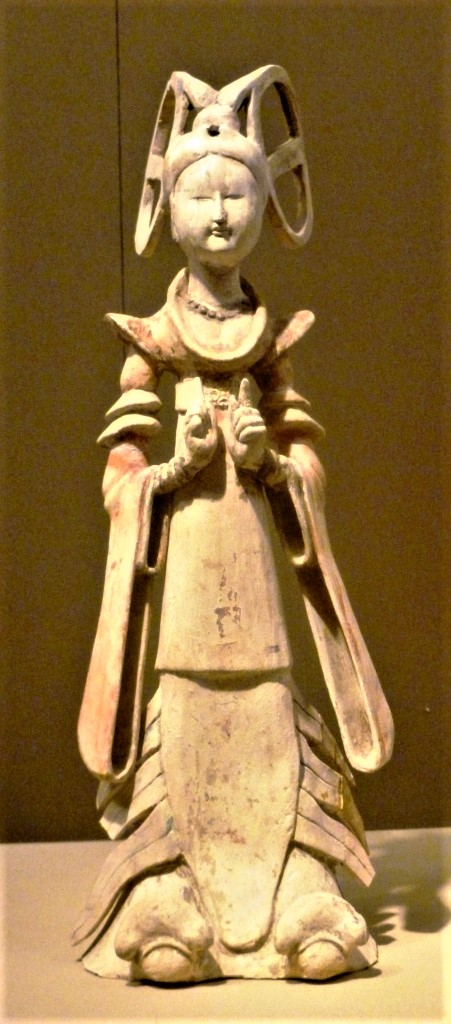
Painted female dancer with rings on the head. Tang dynasty

The Tang dynasty ruling family was paternally Han Chinese and maternally Xianbei, who were a Mongolic people. Tang society followed the traditions of Northern China, which interacted closely with the nomadic peoples of Central Asia and the Eurasian Steppe. In these societies, women and men were more equal than had been permitted during the Han dynasty, with women recorded as handling legal disputes, involved in politics, and participating in warfare. Princess Pingyang, a daughter of the first emperor of the Tang, was instrumental in founding the Tang dynasty, raising and commanding an army of 70,000 soldiers to assist her father's campaign. In addition, women continued to occupy powerful positions in the social consciousness, appearing in tales as powerful spirits responsible for a household's fate, as well as shamans, despite the fact that a secular class of physicians existed during the Tang.

The frequency of marrying female relatives to foreign rulers to forge political alliances increased during the Tang. In contrast to earlier dynasties, the princesses sent by the Tang court were usually genuine members of the imperial house. Far from being passive objects traded between states, the princesses were expected to act as Tang ambassadors and diplomats to the courts they married into. This could be in the role of a cultural ambassador, as in the case of Princess Wencheng, who, along with her co-wife Bhrikuti of Licchavi, is credited with introducing Buddhism to Tibet. An example of a princess acting as a political diplomat is seen in the marriage of Princess Taihe to the head of the Uyghur Khaganate. After being widowed in 824, Princess Taihe was kidnapped twice during the conflict with the Yenisei Kirghiz and made to petition Emperor Wuzong of Tang to formally acknowledge the rebel leader. The message sent to her by Emperor Wuzong, recorded in the Zizhi Tongjian, reveals the political expectations placed on these female diplomats.

先朝割愛隆婚，義寧家園，謂回顧必能御侮，安靜塞垣。今回顧所為，甚不循理，每馬首南向，姑得不畏高祖、太宗之威靈！慾侵擾邊疆，豈不思太皇太后慈愛！為其國母，足得指揮。若回顧不能稟命，則是棄絕姻好，今日已後，不得以姑為詞
Originally, the empire lost its beloved daughter for a marriage that would make peace with the Uyghur Khaganate and cause them to assist in stabilizing and defending the empire's borders. Recently, the actions of the khaganate have been thoroughly unreasonable and its horses have come south. Do you, Aunt, not fear the anger of Emperor Gaozu and Emperor Taizong's spirits! When the empire's borders are disturbed, do you not think of the love of the Grand Empress Dowager! You are the mother of the khaganate and should be powerful enough to issue orders. If the khaganate does not follow your orders, this will end the relationship between our two states and they will no longer be able to hide behind you!

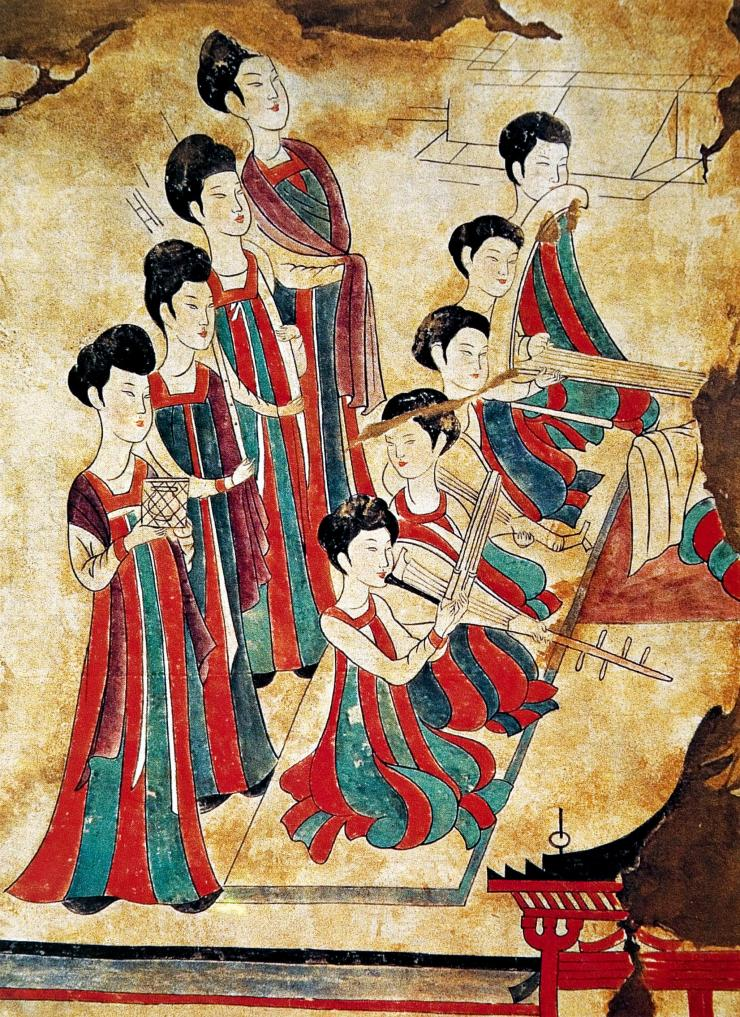
A troupe of musicians painted on the walls of the 7th-century tomb of Li Shou.

The Tang saw an increasing perception of women as a commodity. Although previously only the upper classes had concubines (Chinese: 妾; pinyin: qiè) in addition to one wife (Chinese: 妻; pinyin: qī), Tang legal codes set out the formal differences between wives and concubines, as well as the children born by each. A man was legally only allowed one wife, but could, "purchase as many concubines as he could afford." The legal status of a concubine was very far from that of a maid (Chinese: 婢; pinyin: bì), with maids needing to be 'freed' (Chinese: 放; pinyin: fàng) to change their position. However, a concubine was expected to serve the wife in the same way as a maid, her sons were required to treat the wife as their legal mother, and, on her husband's death, she had no claims to the property he left. Though wives were not supposed to be sold, the perception of women as marketable goods made it simple for husbands to sell their wives to brothel madams, such as those found in eastern Chang'an. The courtesans of Chang'an were employed to sing, converse with, and entertain customers, similar to the Japanese geisha. The girls had often been beggars or indentured to poor families. On entering the brothel, the girls took the madam's surname. A way out was to either marry a client or become a concubine. Venereal diseases were recognized during the Tang and physicians document one similar to gonorrhea that was spread through sex.

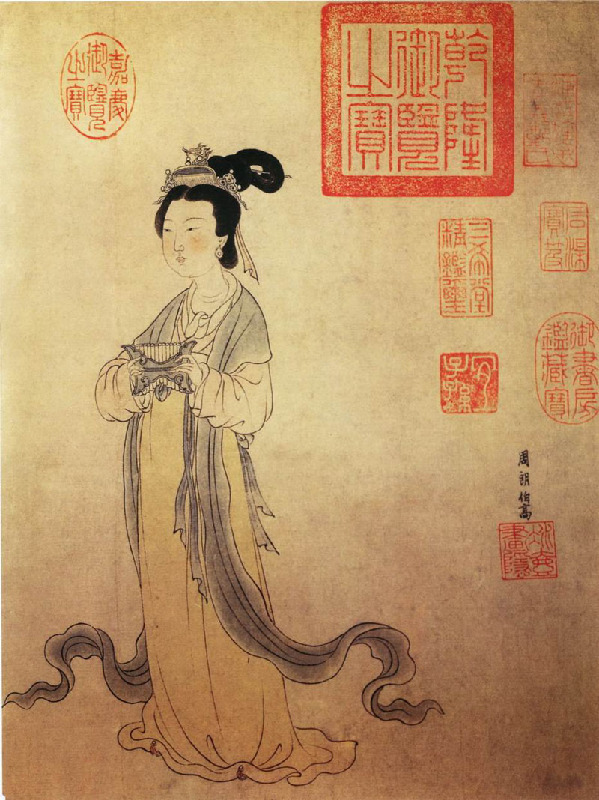
Portrait of Tang dynasty poet Du Qiuniang

The level of education required of courtesans, coupled with their frequently literati clientele, meant that many wrote poetry commenting on current society and events. Li Ye was so famed for her literary talents that she was summoned to the court of Emperor Dezong of Tang to compose poetry for him. Dezong was known for his appreciation of female scholars and talent, as he had previously summoned the five Song sisters and been so impressed with their knowledge of the Classics and poetry that he employed them as court poets. Several other poets of the time, like Li Ye, bridged various social divides, being at different times courtesans and Taoist nuns. Examples of such women included Xue Tao and Yu Xuanji. Not all female poets during the Tang were courtesans, however, and women writers were common enough that the scholar Cai Xingfeng (Chinese: 蔡省風) edited a collection of poetry written exclusively by women, known as the Collection of New Songs from the Jade Lake (Chinese: 瑤池新詠集; pinyin: Yáochí xīn yǒng jí).

Song Ruoshen (Chinese: 宋若莘), Song Ruozhao (宋若昭), Song Ruoxian (宋若憲), Song Ruolun (宋若倫) and Song Ruoxun (宋若荀) were five sisters who all became employed as official poets at the Imperial court. Another known poet was Du Qiuniang, who was the only woman poet to be included in the famous anthology Three Hundred Tang Poems.

Examples of occupations pursued by women include trade (selling foodstuffs), weaving, tending silk worms, singing, dancing, acrobatics, street performance, storytelling, and secretary to officials. Joining a religious institution was also a career choice taken by many women. Chang'an alone reportedly had 27 Buddhist nunneries and six Taoist temples with priestesses in the early 8th century. The nuns participated in religious processions, such as the arrival of a Buddhist relic to Chang'an, when nuns and monks walked behind the vehicle conveying the Buddha's finger bone.

The Tang taxation system calculated the amount owed by every adult male to the state; women were not taxed. However, part of a male's tax included 20 feet of silk or 25 feet of linen woven by the women of his household. In short, the government presumed that a woman would be represented in official bureaucracy by a male guardian. Charles Benn notes that some Tang women adopted a cloak that covered their bodies from head to foot, with only a small gap for their eyes, from the Tuyuhun. The intention was to avoid men's gazes when out and about. The fashion began to fade in the 8th century, which Emperor Gaozong of Tang found distressing, as women's faces were exposed when venturing outside. Gaozong issued two edicts attempting to revive the style, but the headwear was soon replaced by a wide-brimmed hat with a gauze veil hanging from the brim to the shoulders.

=== Song dynasty ===
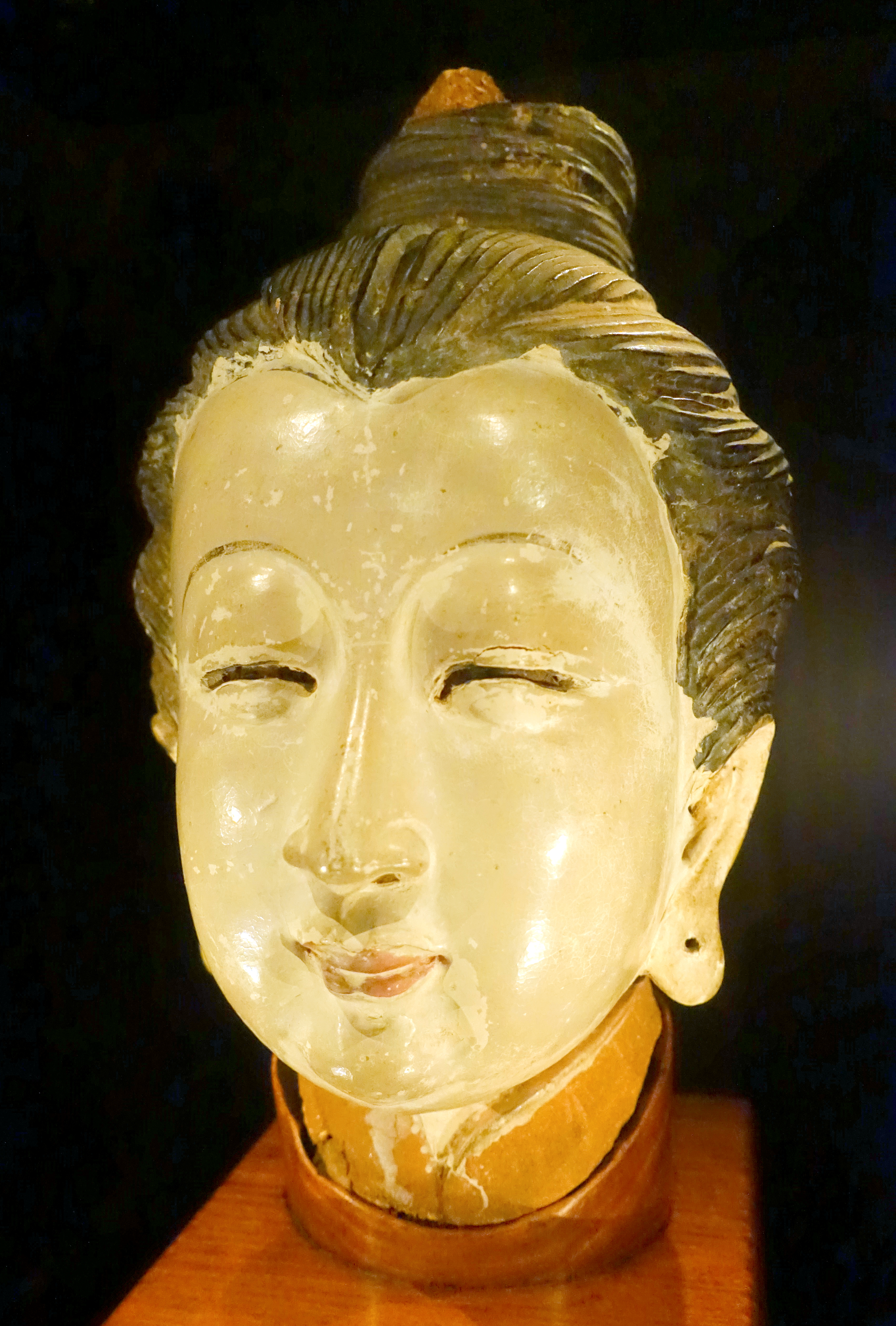
Porcelain woman's head, Song dynasty

During the Song dynasty, neo-Confucianism became the dominant belief system, and it has been argued that the rise of neo-Confucianism had also led to a decline in the status of women. From the Song dynasty onwards, restrictions on women became more pronounced. Female infanticide was also said to have become common. Neo-Confucians of the period such as Sima Guang saw men and woman as being part of the yin and yang order, with the distinction and separation extending to the inner (women) and outer (men), whereby women should remain indoor and not go out from the age of 10, and women should not discuss the matters of men in the outside world. The prominent neo-Confucian Zhu Xi was also accused of believing in the inferiority of women and that men and women needed to be kept strictly separate. Zhu Xi and neo-Confucians such as Cheng Yi also placed strong emphasis on chastity, with Cheng Yi accused of promoting the cult of widow chastity. Cheng Yi considered it improper to marry a widow as she had lost her integrity, and as for widows who had become impoverished due to the death of their husbands, Cheng stated: "To starve to death is a small matter, but to lose one's chastity is a great matter." Chaste widows were praised, and while it was normal for widows to remarry in the early Song period, remarriage would later become a social stigma, which led to hardship and loneliness for many widows. The poet Li Qingzhao, after her first husband Zhao Mingcheng died, remarried briefly when she was 49, for which she was strongly criticized.

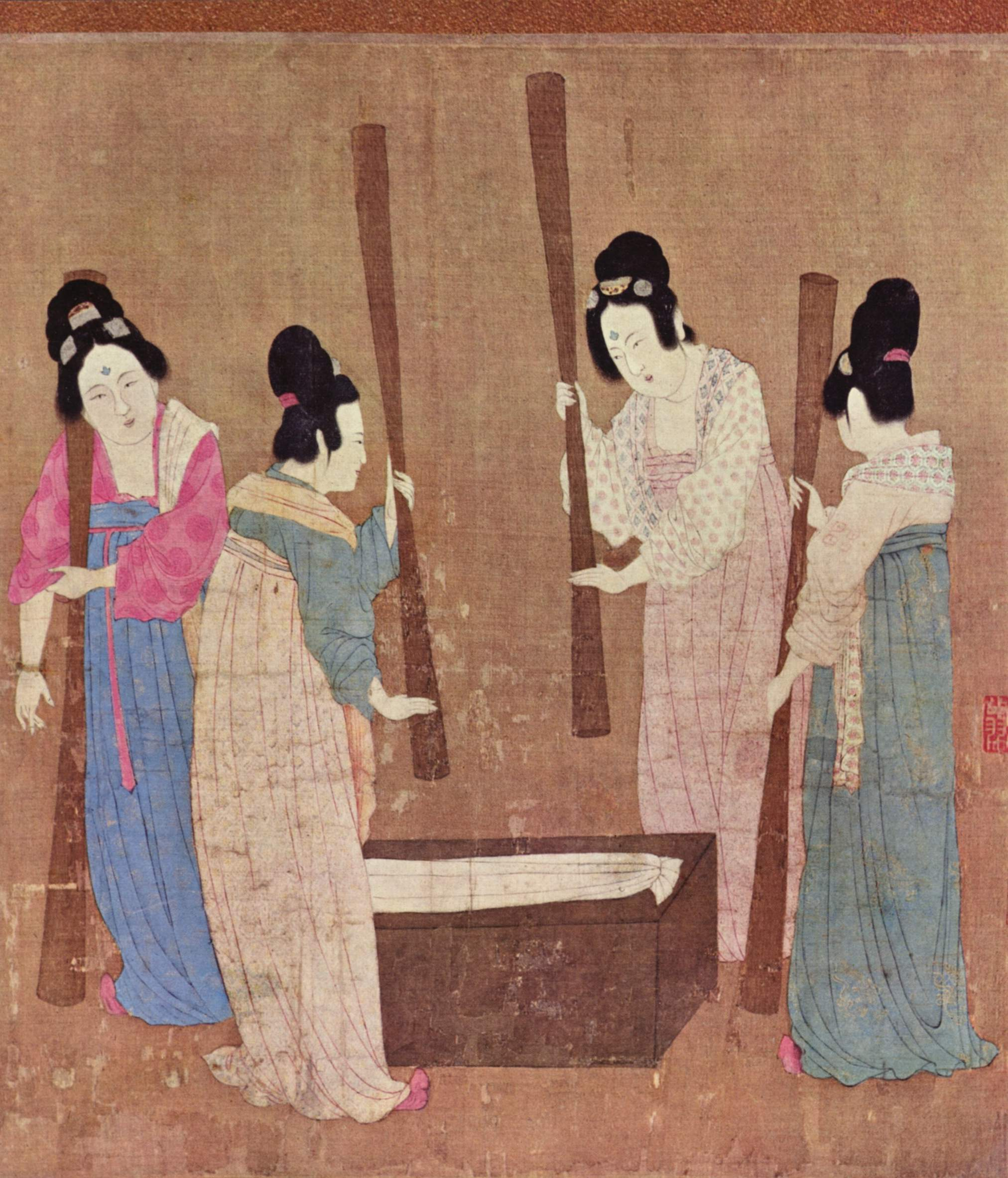
Court Ladies Preparing Newly Woven Silk, attributed to Emperor Huizong in the style of Tang dynasty painter Zhang Xuan

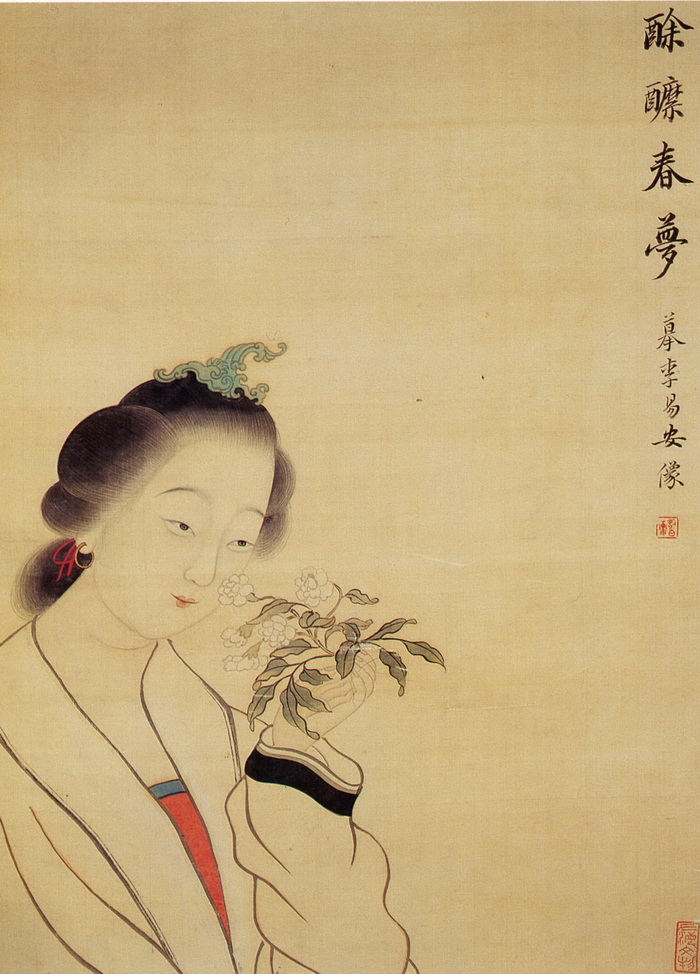
Song dynasty poet Li Qingzhao

While it is commonly argued that the decline of the status of women from the Song dynasty to the Qing was due to the rise of neo-Confucianism, others have also suggested that the cause may be more complex, a result of various social, political, legal, economic, and cultural forces, for example, changes in inheritance practices and social structure. Such changes led to the increasing dominance of orthodox patrilineal ideology, and family practices across China then became standardized by state law based on patriarchal principles. Nevertheless, the neo-Confucians were in part responsible for such changes. For example, it was the Song dynasty neo-Confucians who criticized the practice of women keeping their own dowries including properties they had inherited from their fathers, and after the death of their husbands, returned to the family of their birth along with such properties as well as any wealth they had accumulated during their marriage. Song dynasty widows who returned to their original family, referred to as guizong (歸宗), enjoyed the protection of the laws on property rights, which made their remarriage easier. The neo-Confucians challenged such laws and argued that these widows should stay with their husbands' families to support them. Such neo-Confucian arguments won favor during the Yuan dynasty, and laws were then enacted forbidding women from taking their own properties back to the families of their birth, or to another family should they remarry. In so doing, a woman's property became the property of her first husband's family, which diminished a woman's worth and her prospect of remarriage.

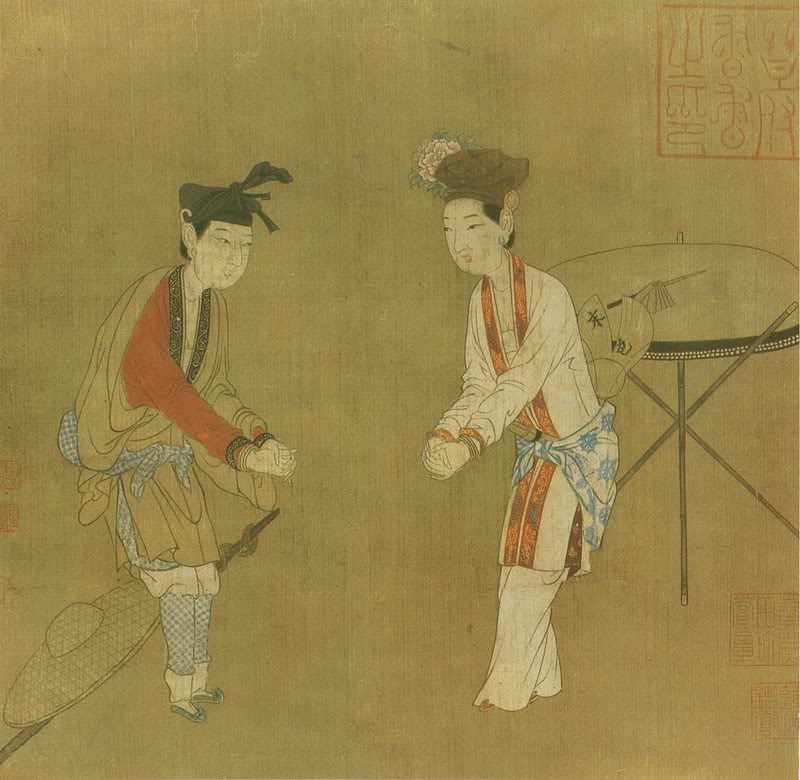
Two women playing male roles in Song dynasty zaju theatre. Women playing male role was a popular convention of the period. One is depicted with bound feet.

During the Song dynasty, foot binding also became popular among the elite, later spreading to other social classes. The earliest known references to bound feet appeared in this period, and evidence from archaeology also indicates that foot binding was practiced among elite women in the thirteenth century. The practice may have originated among elite dancers immediately before the Song dynasty during the Southern Tang (937–976), and ironically the increasing popularity of the practice also led to the decline of the art of dance among women, and less and less was heard about beauties and courtesans who were also great dancers after the Song dynasty.

Women of the period were expected to manage much of household matters, with food preparation for nourishment and entertainment being a significant part of the work. The Song dynasty Wushi Zhongkuilu (Chinese: 吳氏中饋錄; pinyin: Wushi Zhoungkuilu), the earliest known culinary work written by a Chinese woman, reveals the wide variety of dishes essential for daily consumption and the significant amount of curing, pickling, and preservation done by women in households at the time.

In addition to household duties, some women in the Song dynasty received education and engaged in literary pursuits, composing poetry, calligraphy, and scholarly writings, with figures such as Li Qingzhao exemplifying the cultural contributions of educated women. Women also played active roles in local economies, managing textiles, silk production, food preparation, and trade, thereby supporting both household and community wealth. Religious life provided another avenue of for women's agency, as many joined Buddhist or Daoist convents, participated in charitable works, and engaged in copying or preserving texts. While these opportunities existed, practices such as foot-binding, which began among elite women in the Song period, limited mobility and reinforced women's domestic confinement, reflecting the broader social restrictions imposed under Neo-Confucian norms.

=== Yuan dynasty ===
The role of women in Mongol-ruled Yuan dynasty is open to various debates. Mongol women, who divided herding work with men, had more power than women in contemporary China. However, Mongol society was essentially patriarchal, and women were generally expected only to serve her husband and family. The Yuan dynasty practiced marrying female relatives to rulers of neighboring states to forge political alliances like the earlier Tang dynasty, and these Yuan relatives were genuine members of the imperial house.

Jurchen women started becoming nuns of the Quanzhen sect under the Mongols. Guan Daosheng, a Chinese poet and painter who was active during the early Yuan dynasty, is credited with being "the most famous female painter in Chinese history...remembered not only as a talented woman but also as a prominent figure in the history of bamboo painting." Zhao Luanluan was a Chinese poet who lived during the Zhizheng reign (1341–1367), a chaotic time at the end of the Yuan dynasty. She is incorrectly included in the Complete Tang Poems, a Qing dynasty anthology of Tang dynasty poems, whose compilers assumed that she was a courtesan because she composed some erotic poems. Sengge Ragi of Lu, Grand Princess of the State of Lu, was notable for being a patroness of the arts, having commissioned works of art and calligraphy during her lifetime, and was a collector of artwork, most of which dated to the period of the Song dynasty. In 1323, Sengge Ragi held a historic "elegant gathering", which was made unique by the fact that the event was hosted by a woman. Her unique role in hosting the elegant gathering and collecting many fine pieces of art during her lifetime grant her a unique position in the cultural legacy of the Yuan dynasty.

During the Yuan dynasty, due to the different cultural practices of the Mongols and Han people, there were for a time different laws that would be applicable only to the Mongols or the Han communities. For example, among the Mongols, levirate marriage in which a man marries the wife of his deceased brother was common, but such practice was frowned upon by Han Chinese people. Laws promoting widow chastity on Han women were first enacted in part under the influence of the Song dynasty Confucians who argued against the remarriage of widows. In the early 1300s. women were stripped of their dowry rights and forfeited their property should they leave their first marriage. The Yuan promoted Neo Confucian patriarchal ideas formulated by Song dynasty philosopher Zhu Xi. The Yuan also stopped its initial push for levirate practices to be adopted Han, retracting the law and instead adopting the strict neo-Confucian position of Zhu Xi for widow chastity, adopting neo-Confucianism even more than past Han dynasties. Levirate was also banned for non-Han.

=== Ming dynasty ===
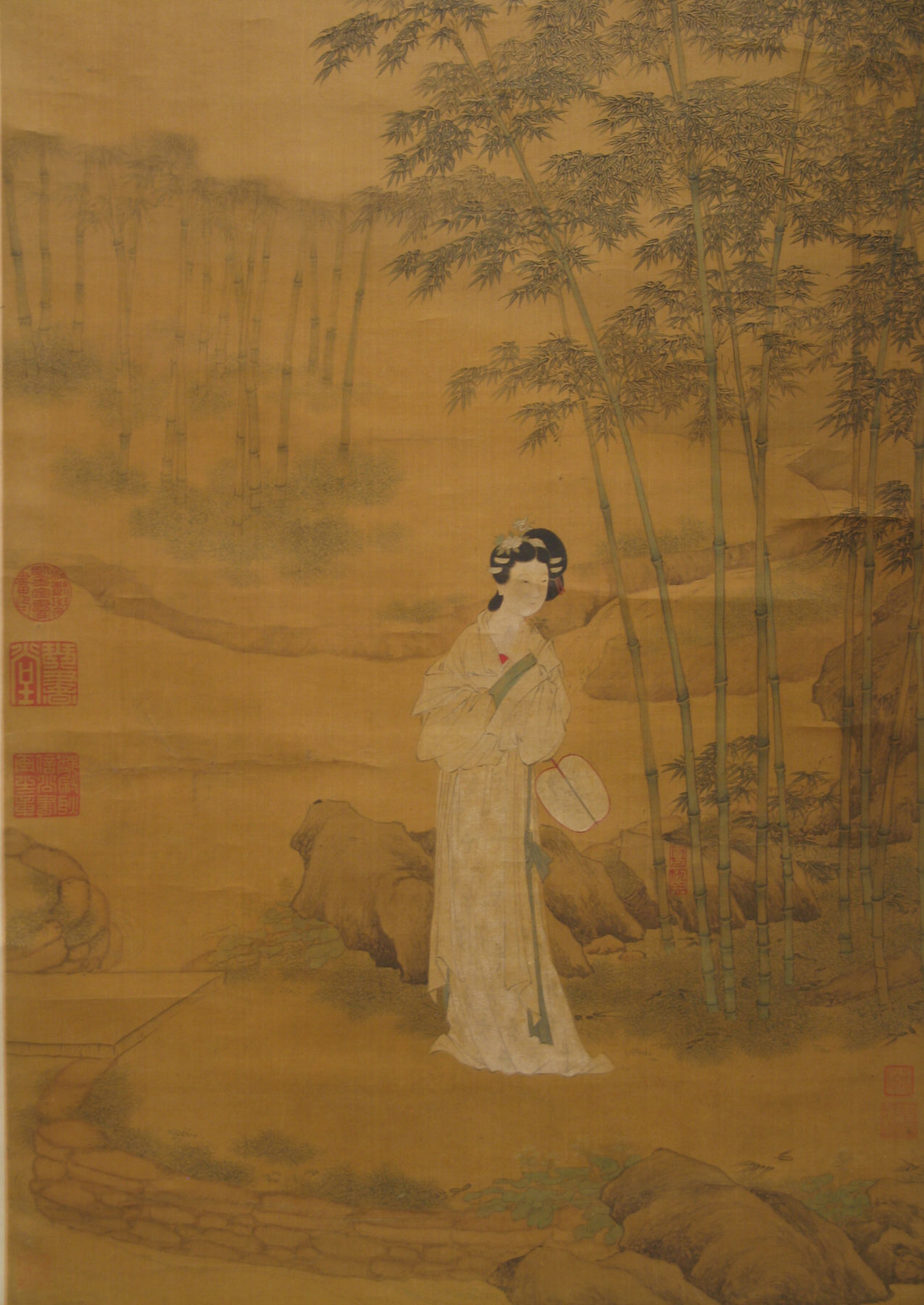
Lady in a Bamboo Grove by Qiu Ying (1494–1552)

During the Ming dynasty, chaste widows were elevated to the role of cultural heroes. Widow chastity became increasingly common, and chastity also became associated with suicide, with suicide by widows increasing dramatically during the Ming era. "Chaste widow" (Chinese: 節妇; pinyin: jiéfù) were commemorated by the construction of memorial chastity arches (Chinese: 貞節牌坊; pinyin: zhēnjiépáifāng) and shrines, and honoured with commemorative writings. The Ming authority began to reward widow chastity, and widows who remarried would have their dowry and their husbands' property forfeited. Such changes in marriage and property laws to discourage remarriage started during the Yuan dynasty, which made widow chastity increasingly popular. The state also awarded 'testimonial of merit' (Chinese: 旌表; pinyin: jīngbiǎo) to chaste widow, giving approval of local chastity cults whereby commemorative arches and shrines were erected to honour the women by members of their families or communities. In the late 16th century, such awards were also extended to women who died resisting rape. Women who died or committed suicide to protect their honour were referred to as "fierce women" (烈女, liènǚ, which is distinct from the homophone term "exemplary women" 列女, liènǚ), with the word "fierce" (烈) carrying connotation of martyrdom.

In contrast to "chaste women" of the Ming period were the "licentious women" (Chinese: 淫妇; pinyin: yínfù). Ming popular literature of the time produced numerous stories about such wanton women, the most notorious being the fictional Pan Jinlian from the novel Jin Ping Mei. During the Ming dynasty, a well-known saying about women also appeared: "A woman without talent is virtuous" (女子無才便是德).

An unusual feature of Ming dynasty imperial marriages was the stipulation by its founder Hongwu Emperor that all the consorts of the Ming court should come from low-ranking families. The result of this policy is that palace women of the Ming era were less powerful compared to those of other dynasties.

==== Women in military roles during the Ming dynasty ====
While Ming ideology emphasized female chastity and domesticity, a few exceptional women assumed military roles during period of crisis.

Qin Liangyu (1574--1648) commanded Ming forces in Sichuan, holding official military rank and leading troops against internal rebellions and the advancing of Manchus. She was honored by the Ming court for her loyalty and service.

Shen Yunying took command of her father's troop during the late Ming period, defending against rebel armies, and even serving as a military leader against Qing forces, though she couldn't stop the dynasty's fall.

=== Qing dynasty ===
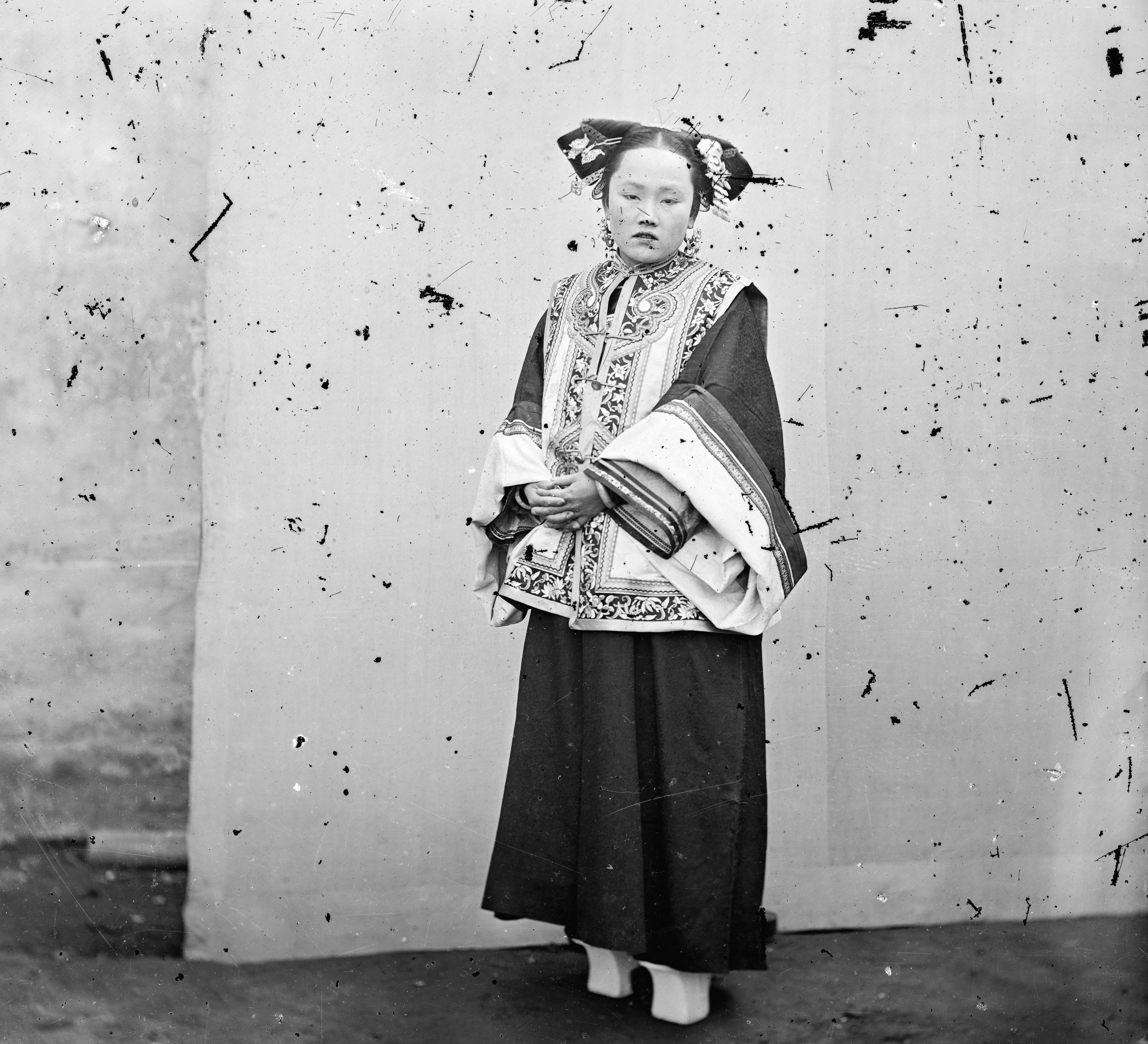
Photograph of a Manchu woman in 1869 wearing shoes with high, narrow platforms to give the impression that her unbound feet are very small.

The social position of women during the Qing dynasty has been characterized as subject to Confucian principles of patrilocality, patrilineality, village exogamy, an agrarian economy, and divisions of labour based on gender. Women had no legal rights to property, other than in relation to their dowries, and were mainly restricted to work that could be conducted within the home, such as weaving. This was facilitated by the common practice of foot-binding, which prevented women from standing or walking. In poor families, women's feet might not be bound or, even if they were, the woman would work in the family's fields. Though the Qing attempted to end the practice (Manchu women were forbidden from binding their feet), doing so among the Han Chinese proved impossible. As in previous periods, women were expected to obey the Three Obediences and obey their fathers in childhood, their husbands when married, and their sons in widowhood. Women's personal names are typically unknown; they were referred to as, "the wife of [X]," or, "mother of [X]." A woman's achievements during her life were closely connected to her ability to bear children; those who could not would be looked down upon by their husbands, in-laws, and neighbors. If a woman did not give birth within a few years, the husband would typically take a concubine. Letters written in women's script between blood sisters show that many women felt abandoned in widowhood, so remarriage was an attractive option, particularly if they had no sons or fathers (affinal or natal) to depend on within the patriarchal society.

Biographies of citizens of merit recognized women for what the writers judged to be moral achievements, such as committing suicide to avoid rape, never marrying in order to uphold filial piety, or being widowed before the age of 30 and remaining a widow for more than 20 years. Even in these biographies, however, the women's names are rarely given. While the Ming authority approved of widow chastity, it was in the Qing period that it was officially promoted, with the practice described by a historian as a "bureaucratic tool of moral reform". To promote female chastity in every community, the government asked local leaders to nominate exemplary women and submit their biographies. If the woman was proven to fit the description of a "chaste widow", her family would receive a personal commendation written by the emperor or a chastity arch would be erected in her community memorializing her. From 1644 to 1736, approximately 6,870 women in the Jiangnan region received such honours. Numerous chastity and filial arches (節孝坊) were constructed in communities all over China. In contrast to the Ming period, however, the Qing actively discouraged the practice of young widows committing suicide on their husband's death (Chinese: 尋死; pinyin: xúnsǐ). Critics of the practice argued that such deaths were usually inspired more by despair than loyalty to the deceased husband, caused by the threat of remarriage, abusive in-laws, etc. Qing law also gave fathers absolute authority over their daughters, including the ability to kill them for behavior they considered shameful, however, a man was forbidden from selling either his wives, concubines or unmarried daughters.

Wifely devotion by suicide was honoured. Peking Gazette 1874 mentions that a widow, aged 24, committed suicide after her husband, a magistrate, fell seriously ill during a thief-taking expedition. She attempted to save him by offering her flesh for medicine and praying, but when he died, she fasted and ultimately swallowed gold leaf. Her act of "self-devotion" was officially honoured with permission for the erection of a memorial tablet.

The Qing government praised demonstrations of virtue and, to prove their commitment to morality, discouraged officials and scholars from visiting courtesans. The developed academic and literary circles cultivated during the Ming by courtesans, like Dong Xiaowan and Liu Rushi, thus declined and, as the Qing stopped regulating prostitutes, large numbers of privately owned brothels appeared. Some of the more expensive brothels had women of the courtesan tradition, who could sing, dance, and entertain their clients.

Women did walk on the roads. And sometimes they got kidnapped. A memorial in Peking Gazette 1877 talks about a noted kidnapper of Wanling district who abducted women and girls for sale at a constant price. He was apprehended for abduction of a woman walking on the road and severely injuring her sister with a sword, who attempted a rescue. The kidnapper was executed, and accomplices were being sought.

Empress Dowager Cixi was effectively the ruler of China in the late Qing period. She governed for 47 years (from 1861 to 1908) from behind the throne of the emperors who were installed as figureheads.

During the Qing dynasty, opposition to foot binding was raised by some Chinese writers in the 18th century, and footbinding was briefly outlawed during the Taiping Rebellion as many its leaders were of Hakka background whose women did not bind their feet. Christian missionaries then played a part in changing opinion on footbinding, and the earliest-known Christian anti-foot binding society, the Heavenly Foot Society, was formed in Xiamen in 1874. It was championed by the Woman's Christian Temperance Movement founded in 1883 and advocated by missionaries to promote equality between the sexes. In 1883, Kang Youwei founded the Anti-Footbinding Society near Canton to combat the practice, and anti-footbinding societies sprang up across the country, with membership for the movement claimed to reach 300,000.

An early Chinese feminist was Qiu Jin, who underwent the painful process of unbinding her own bound feet, attacked footbinding and other traditional practices. In 1902, the Empress Dowager Cixi issued an anti-foot binding edict, but it was soon rescinded. The practice did not start to end until the beginning of the Republic of China era, and the ending of the practice is seen as a significant event in the process of female emancipation in China.

== See also ==
- Women in China
- Four Beauties
- Golden Orchid Society
- Timeline of women in ancient warfare
- Women in Confucian thought
- Women in Buddhism
- Hua Mulan
- Li Qingzhao
- Mui Tsai
- Wu Zetian
- Empress Dowager Cixi
- Nüshu script
- History of China
- Homosexuality in China
- Women in Taoism
