= Song sisters =

Song sisters may refer to:

- Song Ruoshen, Song Ruozhao, Song Ruolun, Song Ruoxian, and Song Ruoxun from the Tang dynasty
- Soong sisters (Ai-ling, Ching-ling, and Mei-ling) or Song sisters, from 20th-century China
- Song Hye-rang and Song Hye-rim from North Korea

== See also ==
- Sisters (song), 1954 song by Irving Berlin
- SisterSong, an activist organization dedicated to reproductive justice
