= Virtue school =

Controversial private education programme in the People's Republic of China

Virtue schools, or female virtue classes (Chinese: 女德班) are privately operated schools or classes in the People's Republic of China that have become controversial for allegedly teaching women so-called traditional Chinese virtues, such as being obedient and subordinate to men.

== Background ==
Since the Qin dynasty, traditional female roles have been present in Chinese society, and women's behaviors have been mandated by the Ming and Qing dynasty eras.

Traditionally, Chinese society has required women to be the "yin" against the male "yang", complementary to their father, husband or son, and placed an emphasis on chastity and a domestic role which does not require scholastic aptitude. Practices such as foot binding, widow suicide and widow chastity were socially-accepted norms.

In addition, various Chinese characters with negative connotations carry the radical 女 (woman), including 嬾 (lazy, languid), 婬 (obscene, lewd) and 媮 (stealing). Some idioms are also contemptuous of women, like the idiom 紅顏禍水, which roughly translates to femme fatale.

The social demands on women moved to be more progressive after the Communist Party took power in China.

== History ==
Since the 2000s, various organizations and companies have organized virtue schools. Various media reports state that virtue schools were organized in Beijing, as well as the provinces of Guangdong, Hainan, Henan, Liaoning, Shaanxi, Shandong, and Zhejiang.

== Operation ==
Some virtue schools have operated under the guise of summer camp classes, while others have targeted families with troubled girls, claiming that they can change the girls for the better with the teaching of traditional values. Some target corporations by claiming their teachings can lead to a more harmonious work environment.

== Course material ==
The classes often involve teaching women that career and femininity do not mix. Some of the core messages include:

- Career women don't end well
- Women should stay at society's bottom level, and don't try to move upwards
- Always obey their father, husband and son's orders
- Never fight back when the husband is physically violent
- Never argue with the husband when he is yelling
- Dressing in a revealing manner verges on vulgar behavior

Some of the more extreme messages include:

- Career women might as well cut off their breasts and uterus
- Ordering takeout is a symbol of unchastity and laziness
- Having sex with more than three men can lead to disease and death
- Changing boyfriends will lead to hands and feet ulceration, resulting in amputation

Some classes attendees have been ordered to use their hands to clean toilets, clean the floor while kneeling, and kneel in front of a Confucius statue to repent for the sin of wearing makeup that is considered to be too heavy.

== Reaction ==
=== Government officials ===
In 2017, education officials shut down an institute that operated female virtue classes under accusations that it violated "socialist core values."

In 2019, China's Ministry of Education banned education groups from teaching a number of topics, including those related to Three Obediences and Four Virtues, fortune-telling and geomancy.

State-owned media have also criticized female virtue classes, denouncing them as being harmful to children.

=== Organizers ===
Groups that have organized female virtue classes have claimed that they are being defamed by online content creators.

=== Society ===
Some web users have criticized female virtue classes as having cult-like properties, as well as being anachronistic.

Some media outlets have noted a certain level of resilience with female virtue classes, in that despite government crackdown, they manage to reopen elsewhere after a forced shutdown.

There is a debate on whether female virtue classes mark a return to feudal Chinese ideas on gender roles rights.
