= Sapphism =

Umbrella term for women loving women

Sapphic
- Pronunciation: /ˈsæfɪk/
- Etymology: Sappho + -ism or -ic
- Abbreviations: WLW
- Subcategories: Lesbian; gynephilic women; bisexual women; asexual women

Other terms
- Derivatives: Sapphist

Flag
- Sapphic pride flag
- Flag name: Sapphic pride flag

Sapphic women or women loving women (WLW) are women attracted to women or in a relationship with another woman, regardless of their sexual orientation, and encompassing the romantic love between women. Uranian and Achillean are male equivalents of sapphism.

== Etymology ==
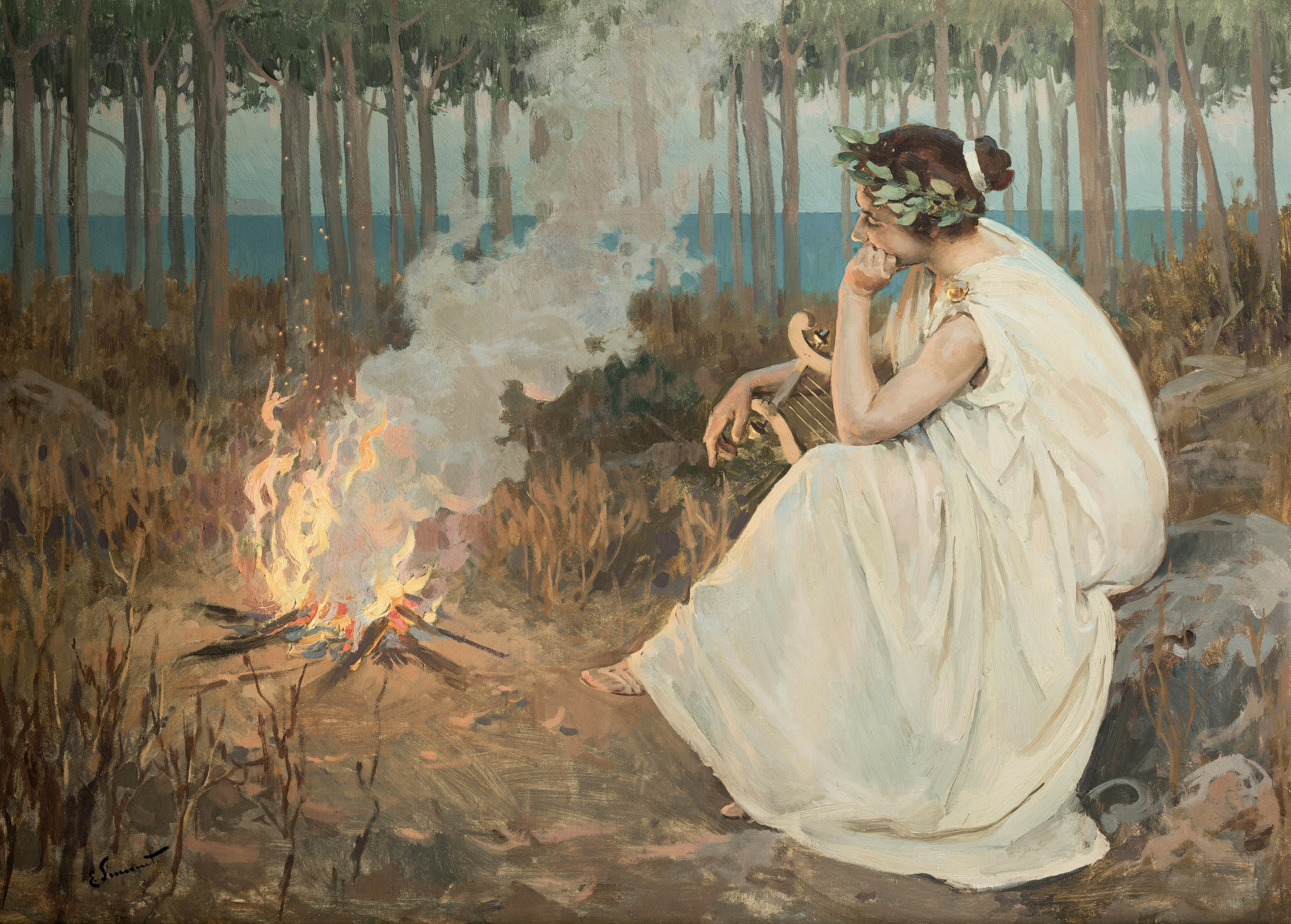
Sappho, by Enrique Simonet.

The term sapphism has been used since the 1890s, and derives from Sappho, a Greek poet whose verses included her accounts of sexual and romantic love between women. According to Oxford English Dictionary, the word sapphist exists at least since 1789.

She was born on the Greek island Lesbos, which also inspired the term lesbianism. Sappho's work is one of the few ancient references to sapphic love.

== Flag and symbolism ==
The first iteration of the sapphic flag was created by Tumblr user lesbeux-moved in 2015, with the pink stripes representing love and a pair of violets representing sapphic love. In 2017 Tumblr user pride-color-schemes created simplified version with a single stylized violet for ease of reproduction. Violets have historically symbolized sapphic love because Sappho frequently referenced them in her poetry.

Several lesbian symbols are or were also used as broader sapphic symbols, including the labrys and the black triangle.

== Use ==
The term sapphic typically encompasses the experiences of lesbian, bisexual, gynephilic, plurisexual, omnisexual and multiromantic women, as well as women who are attracted to women but decline a label, experience a fluid sexuality, or are questioning their sexuality. Asexual and aromantic women who are attracted to women can also be sapphic.

Some sapphic individuals may be non-binary, transfeminine, or transmasculine. There are also equivalent terms for relationships between men (Uranian, Achillean), between a man and a woman (duaric) and involving at least one non-binary person (diamoric or enbian).

Sapphic is also used in lesbian literature for works involving at least one relationship between women, regardless of whether they are lesbian or not.

== See also ==
- Achillean, the male equivalent of sapphism
- Androphilia and gynephilia
- Bisexuality
- Boston marriage
- Female bonding
- Gay
- Golden Orchid Society
- History of lesbianism
- Homosexuality
- Lesbianism
- LGBTQ slang
- Queerplatonic relationship
- Romance (love)
- Romantic friendship
- Sexual diversity
- Terminology of homosexuality
- Tribadism
- Womance
- Women who have sex with women (WSW)
