= Niu Yingzhen =

Tang dynasty poet

Niu Yingzhen (simplified Chinese: 牛应贞; traditional Chinese: 牛應貞; pinyin: Niú Yīngzhēn) was a poet in Imperial China who lived during the 8th century. It was claimed that Niu was able to learn different texts within her dreams. Niu wrote over 100 works and showed talent with composing rhapsodies and odes.

== Personal life ==
Niu was born sometime during the 8th century in present-day Henan. When she was 13 years old, Niu was already well-read in Buddhist sutras and Confucian literature. According to her biography, Niu was able to learn different texts by dreaming that she ate the actual copies, giving her the ability to discuss literature and philosophy with long-deceased male scholars in her dreams. She was questioned about her dreams when she woke up, to which Niu's response was that she did not know how it happened. Despite this, Niu was able to accurately answer any questions that were asked about texts that she had discussed within her dreams. Niu was also well-versed in the Zuo Zhuan, which details the political history of China from 721 B.C. to 463 B.C. She was married to Tang Tangyuan, and later died at 24 years old.

== Literary career ==
Niu wrote over 100 works and showed talent with composing fu (賦) and song (颂). Her work Leaving Behind a Fragrance is missing, but her work Rhapsody on the Questioning of Shadow by Penumbra (魍魉问影赋) is available in the Complete Collection of Tang Prose (Quantangwen). Niu based this work off of the Zhuangzi and it may have also been based on Niu's hidden struggles wanting to join the cultural elite.

It was originally reported that Niu's father, Niu Su, wrote the biography of Niu's life, but it was later believed that Niu's biography was written by Song Ruozhao.
