= Du Qiuniang =

Chinese Tang Dynasty female singer and poet

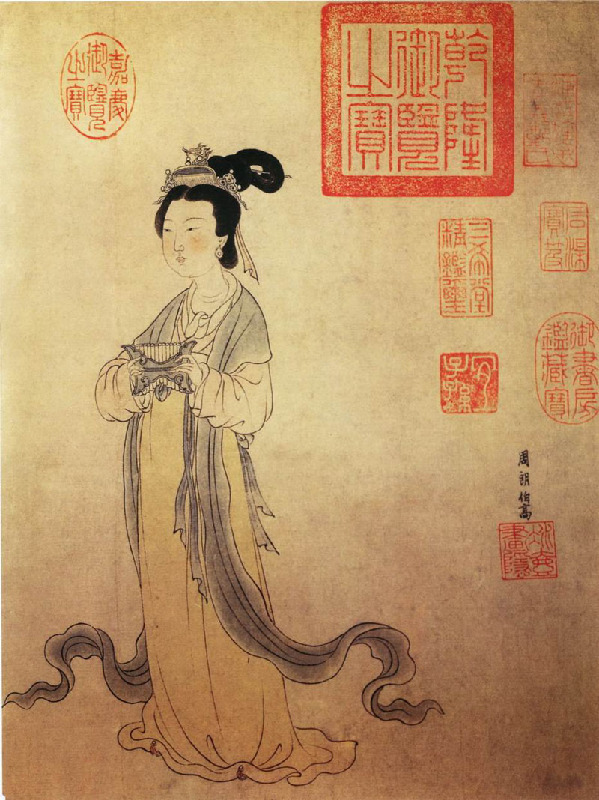
- Portrait of Du by Yuan dynasty painter Zhou Lang, ca. 1300
- Traditional Chinese: 杜秋娘
- Simplified Chinese: 杜秋娘
- Literal meaning: Autumn Maid Du
Transcriptions
Standard Mandarin
- Hanyu Pinyin: Dù Qiūniáng
- Wade–Giles: Tu Ch'iu-Niang
Middle Chinese
- Middle Chinese: /duo^{X} t͡sʰɨu.ɳɨɐŋ/

Du Qiuniang or Du Qiu (AD 791–835) was a Tang dynasty Chinese courtesan and poet. She is the only female poet to be included in the famous anthology Three Hundred Tang Poems.

== Life ==
According to legend, Du Qiuniang's mother was an official singing girl in Jinling. She fell in love with an official named Du and became pregnant. The official was promoted but abandoned his lover. Du Qiuniang's mother gave birth to a child angrily and had nowhere to take care of her, so she had to return to the sing and dance place in Jinling (Jinling Ferry refers to Runzhou in the Tang Dynasty, now Zhenjiang, Jiangsu Province) and took her daughter with her. Du Qiuniang came from a humble background, was naturally beautiful, smart and studious. She studied singing, dancing and reciting poetry in a Jiaofang she was a child. After about ten years of training and study, she became a courtesan with both talent and appearance who could write poems and sing. She became famous at the age of 15. Li Qi, the governor of Zhenhai, bought her into his family as a courtesan with a lot of money. While performing a dance for her master, Du Qiuniang sang the poem "Golden Thread Clothes". After listening to the song, Li Qi admired her with admiration and took her as his concubine. She became a concubine of the military governor Li Qi at fifteen. Tang Xianzong tried to reduce the power of Jiedushi. Li Qi was dissatisfied and rebelled but failed. He was killed in the war. Du Qiuniang was sent to the palace as a maid. She became a courtesan because of her good singing and dancing. Once, Du Qiuniang performed "Golden Thread Clothes" for Xianzong. Xianzong was deeply affected. The two immediately fell in love, and Du Qiuniang was named Qiu Fei.Du Qiuniang was not only Xianzong's beloved concubine, but also his confidential secretary. Xianzong often discussed affairs of state affairs with her, and the two worked together for more than ten years. In the fifteenth year of Yuanhe, Tang Xianzong passed away. The 24-year-old prince Li Heng succeeded to the throne as Emperor Muzong of the Tang Dynasty, and Du Qiuniang was appointed as the tutor and nanny of the prince Li Min. Li Heng died before he was thirty. The fifteen-year-old prince Li Zhan succeeded to the throne as Emperor Jingzong of the Tang Dynasty. He only knew about hunting and playing and ignored state affairs. He was assassinated in the palace soon after. At this time, Li Cou had been named King of Zhang. Du Qiuniang saw that the three emperors died violently in succession and would be killed by the eunuchs, so she conspired with Prime Minister Song Shenxi, determined to get rid of the eunuch Wang Shoucheng and make Li Cou the emperor. Unexpectedly, the eunuchs had many eyes and ears, and the plan was known to the eunuch Wang Shoucheng. As a result, Li Cao was demoted to a commoner, Song Shenxi was demoted to Jiangzhou Sima, and Du Qiuniang also became a commoner, allowing her to return to her hometown.

== Golden Dress Song ==
Her only surviving complete poem is the Golden Dress Song (simplified Chinese: 金缕衣; traditional Chinese: 金縷衣; pinyin: Jīnlǚyī), said to have been addressed to Li (translation by Victor Mair):

I urge you, milord, not to cherish your robe of golden thread,
Rather, milord, I urge you to cherish the time of your youth;
When the flower is open and pluckable, you simply must pluck it,
Don't wait till there are no flowers, vainly to break branches.

The "robe of golden thread" is a synecdoche for Li Qi's official career.

The Golden Dress Song, counseling the listener to enjoy the fleeting pleasures of youth, has been compared to Robert Herrick's To the Virgins, to Make Much of Time.

== Legacy ==
When she was living, poverty and elderly, in her hometown, the poet Du Mu met her and wrote a poem about her (杜秋娘诗). This poem is prefaced by a brief biography of Du Qiuniang, which is the source for the information we have about her life.

There is a character in Tang Xianzu's play The Purple Flute of the same name, which has been taken as a reference to her.

The year of Du Qiuniang's death is unknown. According to the writing time of“The poem Du Qiuniang” with the preface, it was death after the ninth year of Yamato (835). There is a saying that in the winter of the ninth year of Taihe (AD 835), a mutiny broke out in Jinling. Du Qiuniang, who was in her forties, hid from the mutiny and froze to death by the Xuanwu Lake(玄武湖). It is said that in the second year, a patch of peony grew out of nowhere on the shore of Xuanwu Lake and bloomed with blood-red flowers. People rushed to say that this woman who had gone through ups and downs was the Peony Fairy, so a temple was built here to worship her.

== In popular culture ==
- A rendition of Du Qiuniang's "Golden Dress Song" sung by Yao Beina was featured in the 2011 Chinese television series Empresses in the Palace.
