= Song Ruolun =

Song Ruolun (宋若倫) was a Chinese Confucian scholar and poet. She was one of five sisters, who all became employed as official poets at the Imperial court: Song Ruoshen (Chinese: 宋若莘; 768–820), Song Ruozhao, Song Ruoxian, Song Ruolun (宋若倫) and Song Ruoxun (宋若荀).

She was the daughter of the scholar Song Tingfen in Hebei and was given advanced education by her father. In 788, she and her sisters were all taken to court to be tested about their knowledge within Confucianism, History and the Classics. They excelled and each were given an office at court. They were employed as official court poets, performing their poetry at court festivities. Song and her sisters were highly respected at court, referred to by the emperor as teacher-scholars and never treated as concubines.
