= Song Ruozhao =

Chinese Confucian scholar, poet and imperial official of the Tang dynasty

Song Ruozhao (Chinese: 宋若昭; 761–828) was a Chinese Confucian scholar, poet and imperial official of the Tang dynasty (618–906). Her extant works include one poem, a short fiction story and her annotation to her sister's work: Analects for Women, a book about the proper roles and code of conduct for women, and a biography of Niu Yingzhen.

== The Five Sisters ==
Song Ruozhao was the second eldest of the Five Sisters of the Song Family (the eldest Song Ruoshen, the third eldest Song Ruoxian, followed by Song Ruolun and Song Ruoxun), who were known for their learning, literary talent and respected position in the imperial palace. Their father, Song Tingfen, was a Confucian scholar and the progeny of the famous poet Song Zhiwen (c. 656-c. 712) of the early Tang Dynasty. The father taught the five daughters literature, poetry and Confucian classics since they were young, and taught them well. Later, all of the five sisters aspired to devote their life to learning and to bring honor to the family with their knowledge and accomplishment, and all expressed their will not to marry. Among them, the eldest Song Ruoshen and second eldest Song Ruozhao were particularly known for their simple yet elegant writing as well as personality.

== Entering the Imperial Palace ==
In 788, the five sisters and their father Song Tingfen travelled to Shangdang County, where they met Li Baozhen (733-794), a famous general and high-ranking mandarin of the mid-Tang Dynasty. Li was impressed by the learning of the daughters and wrote to the Emperor Dezong (742-805) to praise and recommend the extremely talented Five Sisters. The Emperor, having read the letter from Li Baozhen, immediately asked the five sisters to be presented to the imperial palace to be tested by the Emperor himself. The Emperor asked about poetry, literature, Confucian classics and history, and was also much impressed by the learning of the five girls. As such, the Emperor brought the five girls to the imperial palace. However, he never made them his concubines. Instead, he titled them Interior Scholars and respected their learning, elegance and aspiration. The Emperor was keen on poetry and whenever he discussed poetry with his mandarins, he would also invite the five sisters to join. The respect and favor that the sisters earned from the Emperor also earned their grandfather, father and brother a position in the imperial state.

== Becoming a female official ==
The eldest sister Song Ruoshen was in charge of managing records and accounts of the private quarters of the imperial palace. After she died in 820, the Emperor Muzong (795-824) asked Song Ruozhao to take over her sister's position and bestowed on her the title Shanggong (Chinese: 尚宫), in charge of managing the general palace service. When Muzong was the crown prince, Song Ruozhao had alone instructed him about the Confucian classics, an unusual task for female officials. Moreover, recent research reveals that Shanggong in Tang Dynasty could directly influence and participate in political decision making and the appointment of high-ranking officials and could work as ambassadors of the Emperor , which implies the possible political clout of Song Ruozhao.

Song Ruozhao was particularly good with her interpersonal skills. Having served in the imperial palace for over four decades with six Emperors, Song Ruozhao was called Teacher by emperors Xianzong, Muzong and Jingzong, and was treated and respected as a Teacher by the empresses, concubines, imperial princes and princesses. She was later given the honorable title Lady of Liang.

== Death ==
Song Ruozhao died in 828 in the imperial palace and was given a grand funeral. Many features of the funeral were features only entitled to funerals of the Empress Dowager and the Empress, another indication of her importance to the imperial court of the Tang Dynasty.
