= Song Ruoshen =

Chinese Confucian scholar and poet

Song Ruoshen (Chinese: 宋若莘; d.820), sometimes misspelled Song Ruoxin, was a Chinese Confucian scholar and poet. She was the eldest of five sisters, who all became employed as official poets at the Imperial court: Song Ruozhao (宋若昭, 761–828), Song Ruoxian (宋若憲, 772–835), Song Ruolun (宋若倫) and Song Ruoxun (宋若荀).

She was the daughter of the scholar Song Tingfen in Hebei and was given advanced education by her father. In 788, she and her sisters were all taken to court to be tested about their knowledge within Confucianism, History and the Classics. They excelled and each were given an office at court. They were employed as official court poets, performing their poetry at court festivities. Song and her sisters were highly respected at court, referred to by the emperor as teacher-scholars and never treated as concubines. In 791, Song was given charge of the office of accounts and books. She also wrote a book about female morality.
