= Song Ruoxian =

Chinese Confucian scholar and poet

Song Ruoxian (宋若憲, 772–835) was a Chinese Confucian scholar and poet. She was one of five sisters, who all became employed as official poets at the Imperial court: Song Ruoshen (Chinese: 宋若莘; 768–820), Song Ruozhao, Song Ruoxian, Song Ruolun (宋若倫) and Song Ruoxun (宋若荀). She was the third eldest of the sisters.

She was the daughter of the scholar Song Tingfen in Hebei and was given advanced education by her father. In 788, she and her sisters were all taken to court to be tested about their knowledge within Confucianism, History and the Classics. They excelled and each were given an office at court. They were employed as official court poets, performing their poetry at court festivities. Song and her sisters were highly respected at court, referred to by the emperor as teacher-scholars and never treated as concubines.

Song Ruoxian was given responsibility for the records, books, and accounts of the palace of Emperor Jingzong. She was appointed to positions both 'matron' and 'inner academician'.

In the reign of the succeeding emperor, Emperor Wenzong, Song Ruoxian encountered more difficulty, and was accused of conspiring; she may have been framed by a rival. She was ordered to commit suicide, a decision the emperor later regretted.
