= Three Obediences and Four Virtues =

Confucian social code for women

The Three Obediences and Four Virtues (Chinese: 三從四德; pinyin: Sāncóng Sìdé) is a set of moral principles and social code of behavior for maiden and married women in East Asian Confucianism, especially in ancient and imperial China. Women were to obey their fathers, husbands, and sons, and to be modest and moral in their actions and speech.

== Terminology ==
The two terms ("three obediences" and "four virtues") first appeared in the Book of Etiquette and Ceremonial and in the Rites of Zhou respectively, which codified the protocol for an elegant and refined culture for Chinese civilization. The protocol was originally meant to define the various parts of a harmonious society and was not intended as a rule book. This code had a strong impact on ancient and imperial China. It went on to influence other East Asian civilizations, such as Japan and Korea, and prescribed East Asian social and philosophical thought even into the twentieth century.

== Three Feminine Obediences ==
The Three Obediences instruct that a woman is obligated not to act on her own initiatives and must submissively obey or follow:

1. her father at home, before getting married (未嫁从父; Wèijiàcóngfù; or 在家从父; Zàijiācóngfù)
2. her husband after getting married (既嫁从夫; Jìjiàcóngfū; or 出嫁从夫; Chūjiàcóngfū)
3. her sons in widowhood after her husband's death (夫死从子; Fūsǐcóngzǐ)

== Four Feminine Virtues ==
The Four Feminine Virtues are:

1. Feminine Conduct (婦德; Fùdé)
2. Feminine Speech (婦言; Fùyán)
3. Feminine Comportment (婦容; Fùróng)
4. Feminine Works (婦功; Fùgōng)

Ban Zhao (49–120 CE), the first known female Chinese historian, elaborated on these in her treatise Lessons for Women (Chinese: 女誡; pinyin: Nǚjiè; Wade–Giles: Nuchieh):

Speaking about these four, woman's virtue requires neither unparalleled talents nor exceeding brilliance; woman's speech requires neither rhetorical eloquence nor sharp words; woman's appearance requires neither a beautiful nor a splendid look or form; woman's work demands no unsurpassable skills.

Exhibit tranquility (you 幽 [/ qing 清]), unhurried composure (xian 閒/閑), chastity (zhen 貞), and quietude (jing 靜). Safeguard the integrity (jie 節) of regulations. Keep things in an orderly manner. Guard one's action with a sense of shame. In movement and rest, it is always done in proper measure. This is what is meant by woman's virtue. Choose words [carefully] (ze ci 擇辭) when speaking. Never utter slanderous words. Speak only when the time is right; then, others will not dislike one's utterances. This is what is meant by woman's speech. Wash (guan wan 盥浣) clothes that are dusty and soiled, and keep one's clothing and accessories always fresh and clean. Bathe regularly, and keep one's body free from filth and disgrace. This is what is meant by woman's bearing. Concentrate on one's weaving and spinning. Love no silly play nor laughter. Prepare wine and food neatly and orderly to offer to the guests. This is what is meant by woman's work.

== See also ==
- Three Fundamental Bonds and Five Constant Virtues
- Chbab srey
- Good Wife, Wise Mother

== Bibliography ==
- Kelleher, M. Theresa (2005). "San-ts'ung ssu-te". In Taylor, Rodney L.; Choy, Howard Y.F. (eds.). The Illustrated Encyclopedia of Confucianism. Vol. 2 N-Z. New York: The Rosen Publishing Group. p. 496. ISBN 9780823940813.
- Knapp, Keith (2015). "Sancong side 三从四德 (Threefold obedience and four virtues)". In Yao Xinzhong (ed.). Encyclopedia of Confucianism. Oxon: Routledge. ISBN 9781317793489.
