= Golden Orchid Society =

Late Qing dynasty social movement

The Golden Orchid Society (Chinese: 金兰会) was a late Qing dynasty social movement and community based in Guangdong, China. The women enjoyed relative independence due to their involvement in this region's silk industry.

The Golden Orchid Society provided an alternative model of social security for the women. Women who entered the Golden Orchid Society through an oath of sisterhood either refused to enter marriage, or married formally but refused consummation. If a sister was forced into marriage the sisterhood would threaten, and sometimes commit, group suicide. Some of the sisterhood relationships may have been of a sexual nature. According to Bret Hinsch, there is documentation of members of this group joining into same-sex marriage arrangements.
