= Widow chastity =

Ideal in traditional Chinese cultural practices

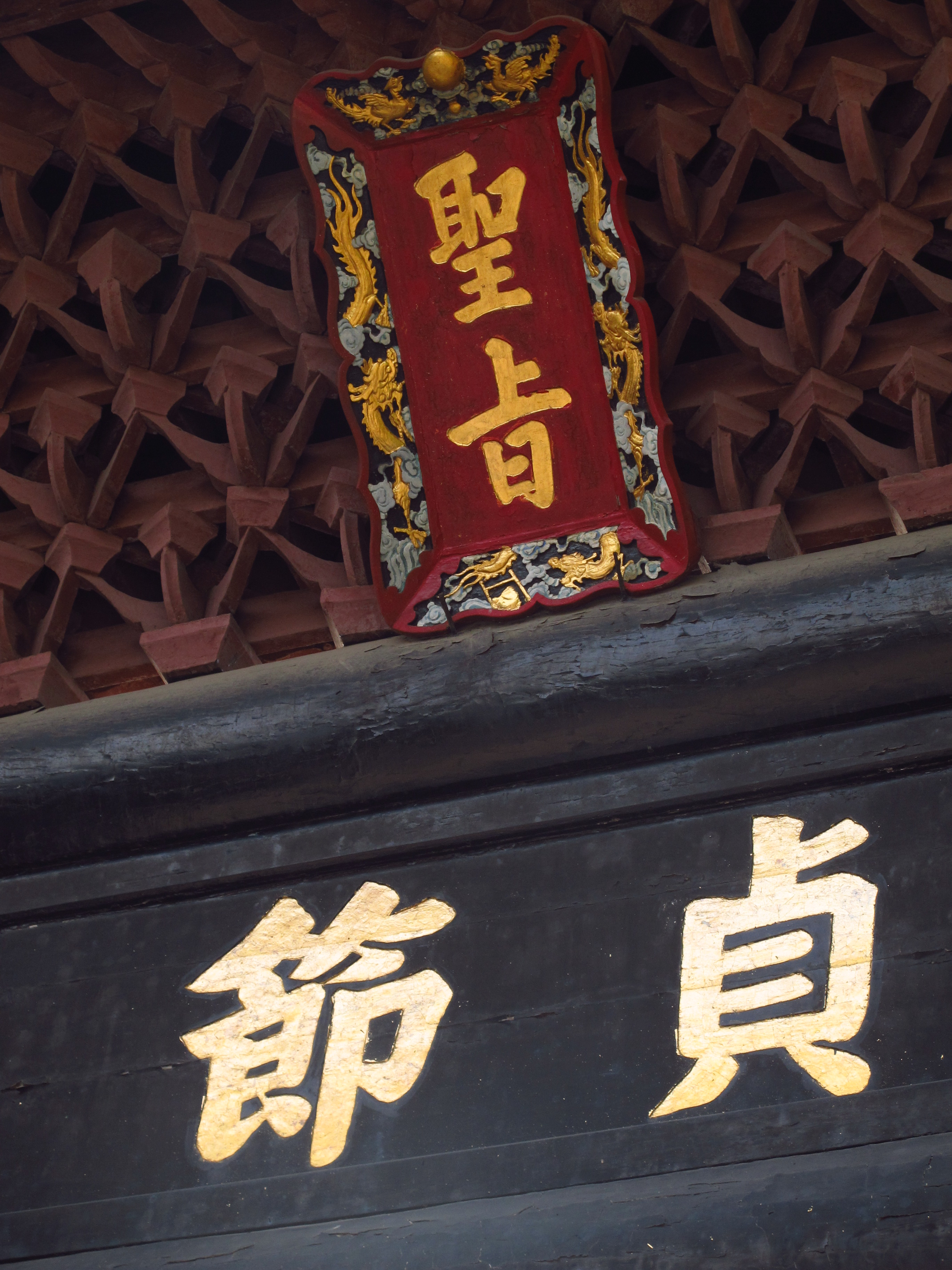
Chastity or moral integrity (貞節; zhēnjié) memorial

Widow chastity (Chinese: 貞節) was an ideal in traditional Chinese cultural practices and beliefs that honored widowed women and discouraged their remarriage, encouraging them instead to live a life of "virtuous chastity". The idea of widow chastity has a long history in China, but the emphasis on the practice is believed to have its origin among Song dynasty Neo-Confucians, and reached a culmination and eventual end in the Qing era.

== History ==
=== Early periods ===
The idea of widow chastity may be found as early as the Zhou dynasty Book of Rites. During the Han dynasty, Ban Zhao wrote: "According to ritual, husbands have a duty to marry again, but there is no text that authorizes a woman to remarry." Liu Xiang also wrote about widow chastity in his work Biographies of Exemplary Women. Widow chastity gained prominence in the later Han dynasty, and chaste widows were rewarded. During the Tang dynasty, widows may be protected from forcible remarriage that would see them losing rights to their deceased husbands' property.

=== Song dynasty ===
During the Song dynasty, Confucianism became the dominant belief system, and neo-Confucians such as Cheng Yi and Zhu Xi placed strong emphasis on chastity; Cheng Yi is believed to be responsible for the rise of the cult of widow chastity. Cheng Yi thought it improper for a man to marry a widow because "a marriage is a match and if one takes someone who has already lost her integrity, he would also lose his". On the question of widows who had become impoverished due to the death of their husbands, Cheng stated: "To starve to death is a small matter, but to lose one's chastity is a great matter."

During the Song dynasty, it was common for women to keep their own dowries including properties they had inherited from their fathers, and after the death of their husbands, they may return to the family of their birth along with such properties as well as any wealth they had accumulated during their marriage. Song dynasty widows who returned to their original family enjoyed the protection of the laws on property rights, which made their remarriage easier. The neo-Confucians challenged such laws, arguing that these widows should stay with their husbands' families to support them. While it was normal for widows to remarry in the early Song period, remarriage became a social stigma in later eras due to the influence of Confucians; this led to hardship and loneliness for many widows. The Song poetess Li Qingzhao, after her first husband Zhao Mingcheng died, remarried briefly when she was aged 49, for which she was strongly criticised.

=== Yuan dynasty ===
During the Yuan dynasty, laws promoting widow chastity were first enacted in part under the influence of Song dynasty Confucians who argued against remarriage of widows. Such laws forbade women from taking their own properties back to the families of their birth, or to another family should they remarry. In so doing, a woman's property became the property of her first husband's family, which affected a woman's worth and her prospect of remarriage.

=== Ming dynasty ===
During the Ming dynasty, widow chastity became increasingly common, gained wide prominence and was given legal support. Marriage and property laws that discouraged remarriage started during the Yuan dynasty also made widow chastity increasingly popular. Chaste widows were elevated to the role of cultural heroes, and the state awarded 'testimonials of merit' (旌表; jingbiao) to chaste women. Such awards had been given to chaste widows (節婦) since the early 14th century during the Yuan dynasty, and extended to women who died resisting rape (烈女) in the late 16th century. The state gave approval to local chastity cults whereby commemorative arches (貞節坊) and shrines were constructed to honor the women by members of their families or communities, and honored them with commemorative writings. Chastity also became associated with suicide, and suicide by widows increased dramatically during the Ming era.

=== Qing dynasty ===
A chastity memorial arch

During the Qing period, the prevalence of child marriage along with a high rate of premature death among men left a substantial number of young women as widows. Typically, a widowed woman would have been taken into her husband's familial household before his death and as a result would be unable to fulfill her intended purpose; giving birth to a male child to continue the husband's blood line. However, due to Qing-era China's higher proportion of men (mostly due to female infanticide) a fertile woman, despite her previous marriage, could be sold and wed to another family for a substantial price.

The Qing court disapproved of this practice, and instead regarded widow chastity as the epitome of filial piety and also as a statement of loyalty to the imperial court and government officials. To promote this viewpoint the Qing court arranged to confer honors upon a family housing a chaste widow, along with other measures such as the construction of a large and ornate ceremonial arch—"Chastity Paifang" or "Chastity and Filial Paifang" (節孝牌坊)—in the family's community. Widows were also encouraged to adhere to chastity by legal measures: according to Qing era law, a widow could only inherit or act as a custodian of her husband's property if she preserved her sexuality as a statement of "loyalty" to her late husband. In culturally dissident regions of the Chinese empire, government officials started "Widow Chastity" crusades to enforce orthodox Chinese culture and eliminate unconventional marriage customs, particularly the levirate marriage, a practice in which a man marries his dead brother's widow in order to continue his blood line.

== Decline ==
The "widow chastity" agenda began to attract controversy from the Qing court when elite families in central regions of China started using the imperial commendation of widow chastity to gain an edge in social competition within their communities. Authorities were particularly concerned with dubious cases in which honors had been given to families where the widow had committed suicide following her husband's death. Despite suicide being regarded as an honorable and virtuous course of action for a widow to take, the circumstances surrounding these suicides were often very suspicious and suggested foul play on the part of the husband's family. Eventually this issue led the imperial court to promote "Widow Chastity" with much less zeal and to offer honors with more careful discretion. New cultural and intellectual developments in Qing China, in particular the "Evidential Research Movement" (Kaozheng), also began to open up new conversations on the fundamental morality of "Widow Chastity". Skeptics of the neo-Confucian status quo of the time, notably Wang Zhong, condemned "Widow Chastity" as a collection of outdated rituals lacking in logic and basic human compassion.

== See also ==
- Chastity Arch for Qiu Liang-gong's Mother
