= Poseokjeong =

Former Silla-era villa in South Korea

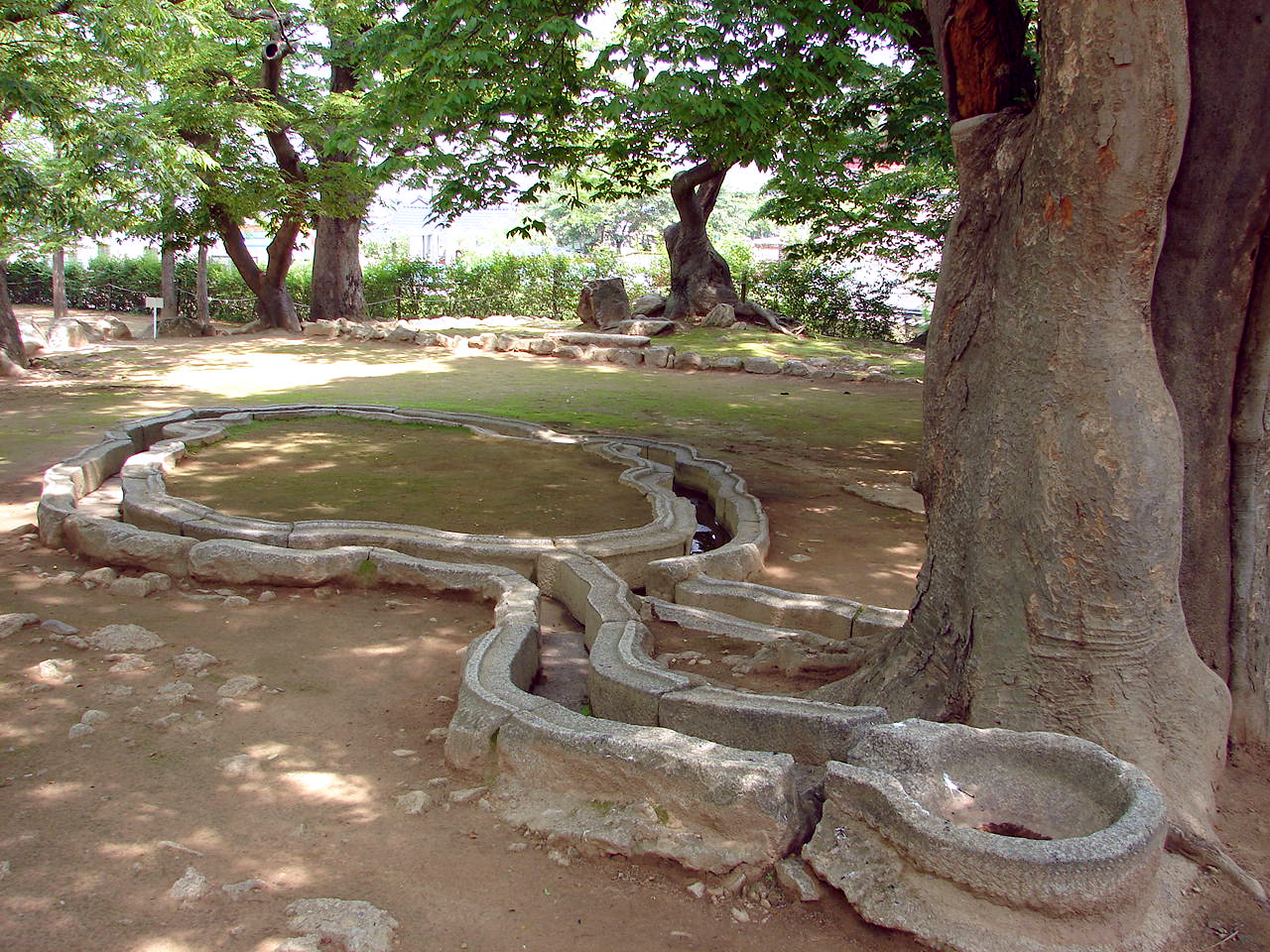
- Carved granite blocks containing the stream for floating the nobles' wine glasses during the King's banquets (2006)
- Interactive map of Poseokjeong
- 35.8069°N 129.2130°E

Historic Sites of South Korea
- Official name: Poseokjeong Pavilion Site, Gyeongju
- Designated: 1963-01-21

Korean name
- Hangul: 포석정
- Hanja: 鮑石亭
- RR: Poseokjeong
- MR: P'osŏkchŏng

The Poseokjeong (Korean: 포석정; Hanja: 鮑石亭; lit. 'Pavilion of Stone Abalone') site near Namsan in Gyeongju, South Korea, was built in the Unified Silla period. The site once featured a royal pavilion which was said to have been the most beautiful royal villa of the time. Today, the only surviving remnant of the pavilion is a granite water feature.

It was designated a Historic Site of South Korea in 1963.

== Description ==
The water feature consists of several hand-carved stone pieces. These pieces create a smoothed shape that slopes slightly, which allows for the flow of water.

During banquets in the last days of the Unified Silla kingdom, the king's official and noble guests would engage in winding stream parties. These involved sitting along the watercourse, chatting, reciting poetry and engaging in drinking games. In one particular game, one of the guests would enunciate a line of poetry, challenge one of the other guests to compose an appropriate second line while the first floated a cup of wine in the water. Should the cup of wine reach the guest before he submitted a suitable verse, he would consume the entire cup of wine. He would then try to compose the poetry before receiving a glass again— should he fail again, he would continue repeating the process until a verse was produced. Due to the variety of curves in the channel, the speed at which the wine cups transversed the course would vary based on the shape of the cup, rate of the water flow and amount of wine in the cup.

The site has an area of 7,432 m^{2}/4.6 mi^{2}. There are no records of when Poseokjeong was built, but the stone channel is known to have been created in the time of Unified Silla. It was designated as historic site No.1 in 1963. Poseokjeong is named after the abalone-shaped water feature. The feature itself is about 10.3 m/11.2 yd in length and 5 m/5.4 yd in width, and consists of 63 blocks of granite. These blocks are on average 26 cm/10.2 in deep and 35 cm/13.8 in wide. Zelkova, pine and bamboo trees preserve a calm atmosphere at Poseokjeong today, but the garden was tended differently at the time. Some of the trees are several hundred years old.

When in use, the watercourse was thought to have used water from the nearby stream in the Namsan valley. The water of the Namsan valley was appreciated by the Silla people for its purity and cleanliness. A stone statue of a turtle once spewed water into the channel, but this feature is no longer present.

A legend is linked to Poseokjeong. According to this legend, the spirit of Namsan attended a party of king Heong-gang Wang. The king danced after the god, which according to the legend started a Silla dance known as eomu sansinmu (King Dances, God Dances).

King Gyeongae of Silla (r. 924-927) was killed at Poseokjeong, while indulging in his pleasures here, by King Kyŏn Hwŏn of Later Baekje. For that reason Poseokjeong stands symbolically for the demise of the Silla kingdom.

== Gallery ==
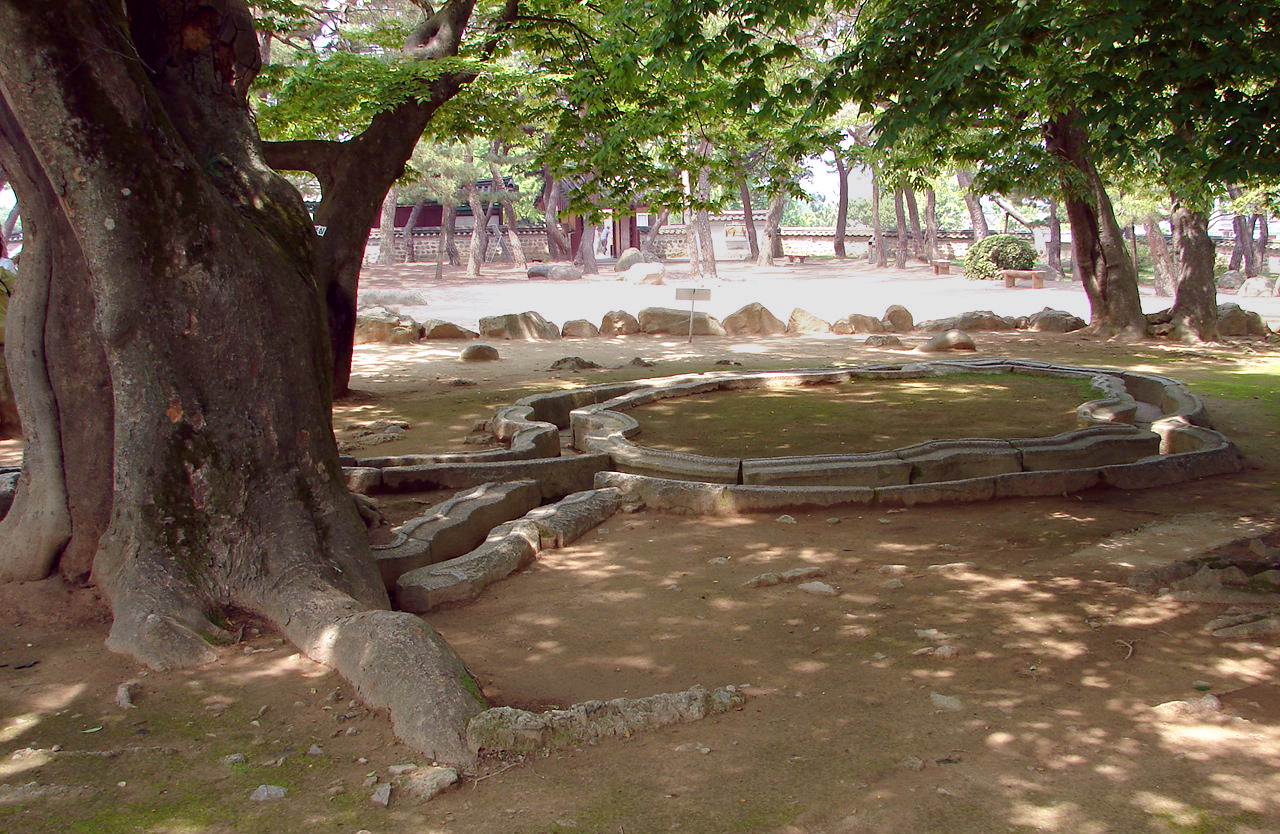

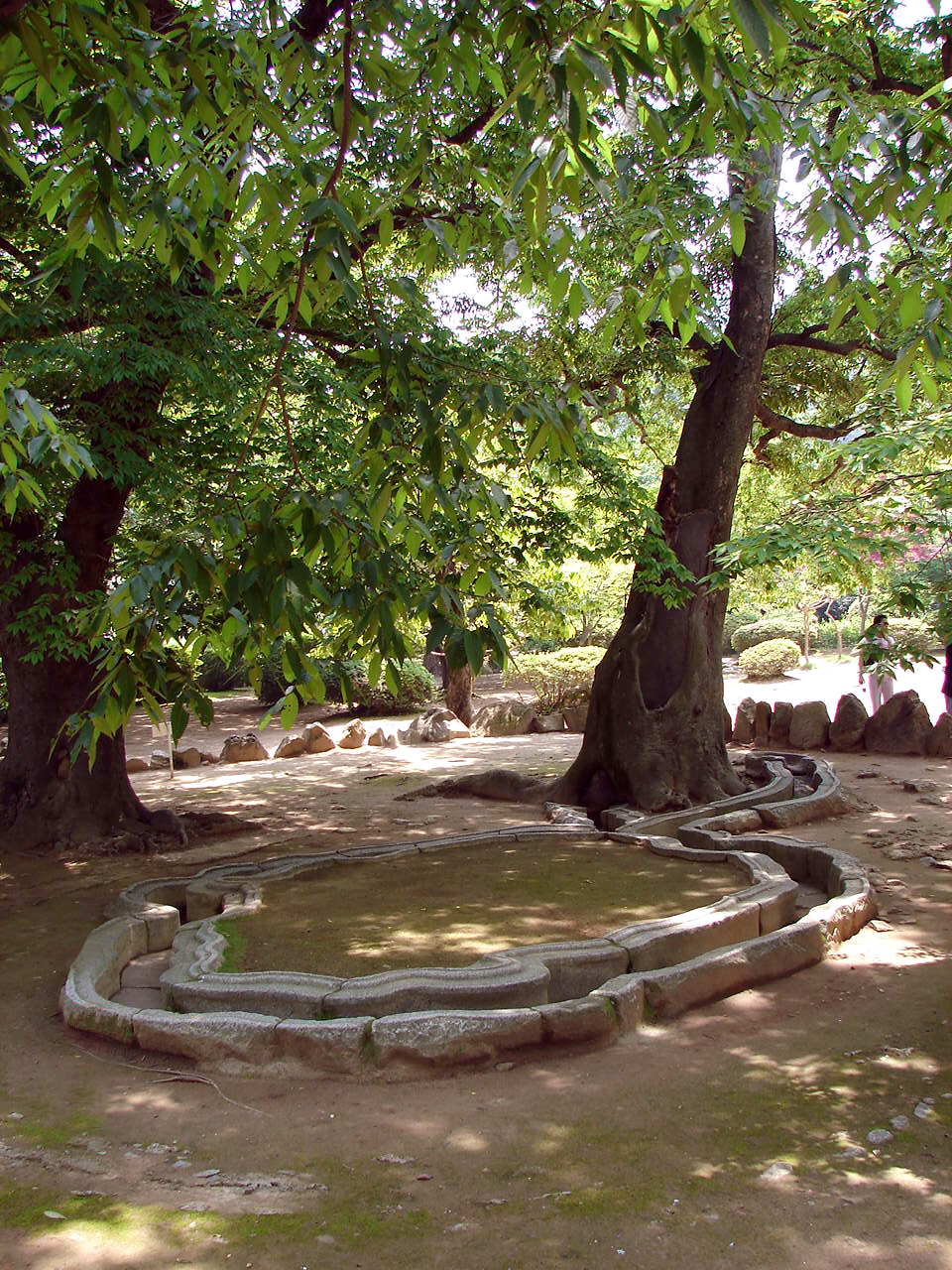

== See also ==
- Tourism in Gyeongju
- Culture of Korea
- Korean architecture
