= Yang Chia-hsien =

Taiwanese writer and academic

- Born: 楊佳嫻; 15 June 1978 (age 48); Kaohsiung, Taiwan
- Education: National Chengchi University (BA); National Taiwan University (PhD)
- Occupations: writer, essayist

Yang Chia-hsien (Chinese: 楊佳嫻; born 15 June 1978) is a contemporary Taiwanese writer, poet, essayist, and literary critic. She is also an assistant professor of Department of Chinese Literature at the National Tsing Hua University. Yang sees Lu Xun, Zhang Ai-ling and Yang Mu as the influences of her writings. Yang is regarded as an iconic poet of the cyber-age. Her works, including The Civilization of Holding One’s Breath and Sea Breeze and Sparks, are described as incorporating classical concepts and modern perceptions. Yang was also the youngest poet to be included in the Comprehensive Anthology of Contemporary Chinese Literature in Taiwan(Vol. 2), and the youngest entrant of the Thirty Years of Elite Taiwan Literature: Thirty New Poets.

== Biography ==
=== Early life and education ===
Born in 1978, Yang Chia-hsien experienced Taiwan's transition from a militarized society to a democratic, free society after the lifting of martial law in 1987 when she was a child. Yang was born and raised in Kaohsiung, a city in southern Taiwan. Her life in Kaohsiung is mentioned in some of her works and interviews. In her prose The Flowing Room, Yang writes about her teenage and her family; Yang and her younger sister lived with their parents in an apartment, but her parents divorced when she was studying at university. In her school days, Yang immersed herself in the classical Song Poetry, as well as modernist poetry such as the works of Xi Murong and Chen Yizhi. These works have great influence on Yang's poetry. She was also the editor of the school newspaper in high school. She moved to Taipei when she was eighteen to attend the National Chengchi University. After earning the BA in Chinese degree, Yang continued to study towards her master and PhD in Chinese degrees at the National Taiwan University.

=== Career ===
Yang started writing when she was in high school. Although she won the first prize of the poetry category in the writing contest held by her school, her early works were mostly prose. She started creating a large amount of poems when she was at university. The popularization of the Internet from late 1990s to early 2000s provided her with the platform to share her works with the world. Yang frequently posted her works on poetry BBS and her blog, from 1998 to 2002, she has published around 230 poems and 90 prose online. Since the establishment in 1998, in three years' time her blog had been viewed for over 260 thousand times, which made Yang an internet self-publishing celebrity and pioneer in Taiwan. In 2003, Yang published her first poetry collection, The Civilization of Holding One’s Breath; the next year she published her first prose collection, Sea Breeze and Sparks. After getting her PhD degree, Yang works as an assistant professor of the Chinese Literature Department at the National Tsing Hua University. She has published various critical article and research books of contemporary Chinese and Taiwanese literature. To promote Chinese and Taiwanese literature and poetry, Yang occasionally gives lectures at different literary events. Also, she has been one of the curators of the Taipei Poetry Festival since 2011.

== Writing style ==
Yang's prose place great emphasis on the exploration of space and the expression of love and pain. They also discuss fashion trends and consumerism in modern city life in a calm style and with an occasional poetic form.

Yang's poems are written in classical structure, but the transformation of the shape, sound or meaning of words exhibits modern images and content. Her poetry has been commented by Yang Mu as “extensively creating a variety of ever-changing realms and emotions, and boldly utilizing traditional literary allusions.” Tang Juan-ping, a reputable Taiwanese poet and critic, also points out that, “when the lines carry on, the soul promotes a kind of classical concept, while the body bursts forth with a kind of modern perception. These two aspects often create paradoxes, wrestling with each other and forming a unique style.” Also, her poetry is described as presenting to readers "a world of emotional expression, a world of pure expression; drama and narration play a lesser role.” The foundation of her aesthetics, “can be described in a general sense as modernism, while its spirit merges Western symbolism with high modernism.”

== Awards ==
- 2003: National Student's Literature Award, Quality Award of Degree level(Poetry), 大水之夜等三首"The Night of Flood and Three Other Poems"
- 2004: Taipei Literature Award, Annual Prize, 我的溫州街, 及其他 "My Wenzhou Street, and Other Stories"

== Works ==
Yang Chia-hsien's works include prose, poetry, non-fictions, compilations, and critical essays. All of her works are written in Chinese and have not been translated into other languages.

=== Poetry collections ===
- 《屏息的文明》The Civilization of Holding One’s Breath (2003)
- 《你的聲音充滿時間》Your Voice Fills Time (2006)
- 《少女維特》Werther the Maid (2010)
- 《金烏》 The Golden Bird (2013)

=== Prose Collections ===
- 《海風野火花》Sea Breeze and Sparks (2004)
- 《雲和》 Peaceful Clouds (2006)
- 《瑪德蓮》Madeleine (2012)

=== Non-fictions ===
- 《懸崖上的花園：太平洋戰爭時期上海文學場域（1942-1945）》 Garden on the Cliff: Shanghainese Literature during the Pacific War (1942-1945) (2004)
- 《方舟上的日子：台灣眷村文學》 Days on the Ark: Literature of the Military Dependent's Village in Taiwan (2013)
