= Winding stream party =

Chinese custom

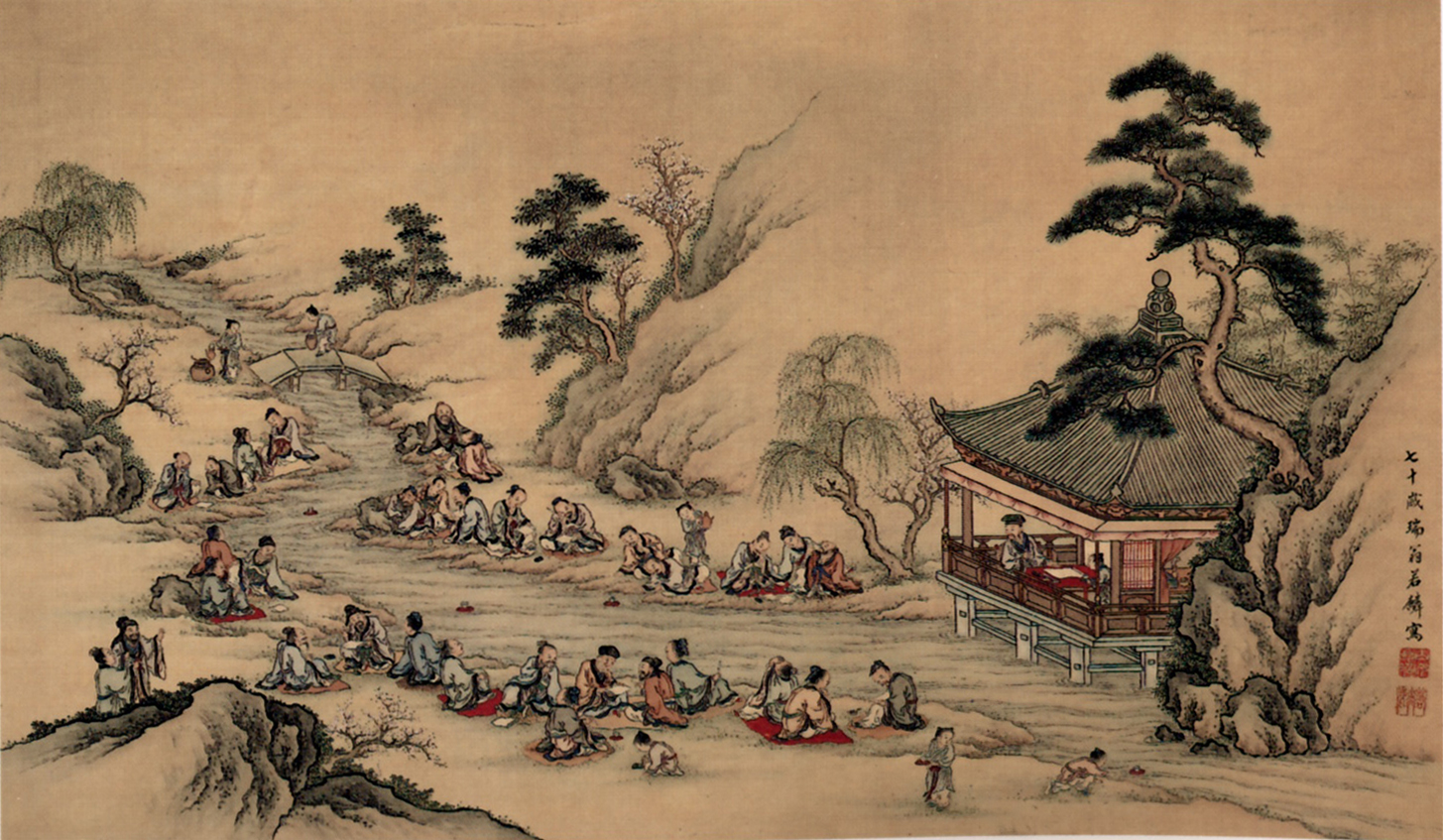
The Winding Stream Party at Orchid Pavilion in Shaoxing, hosted by Wang Xizhi in 353

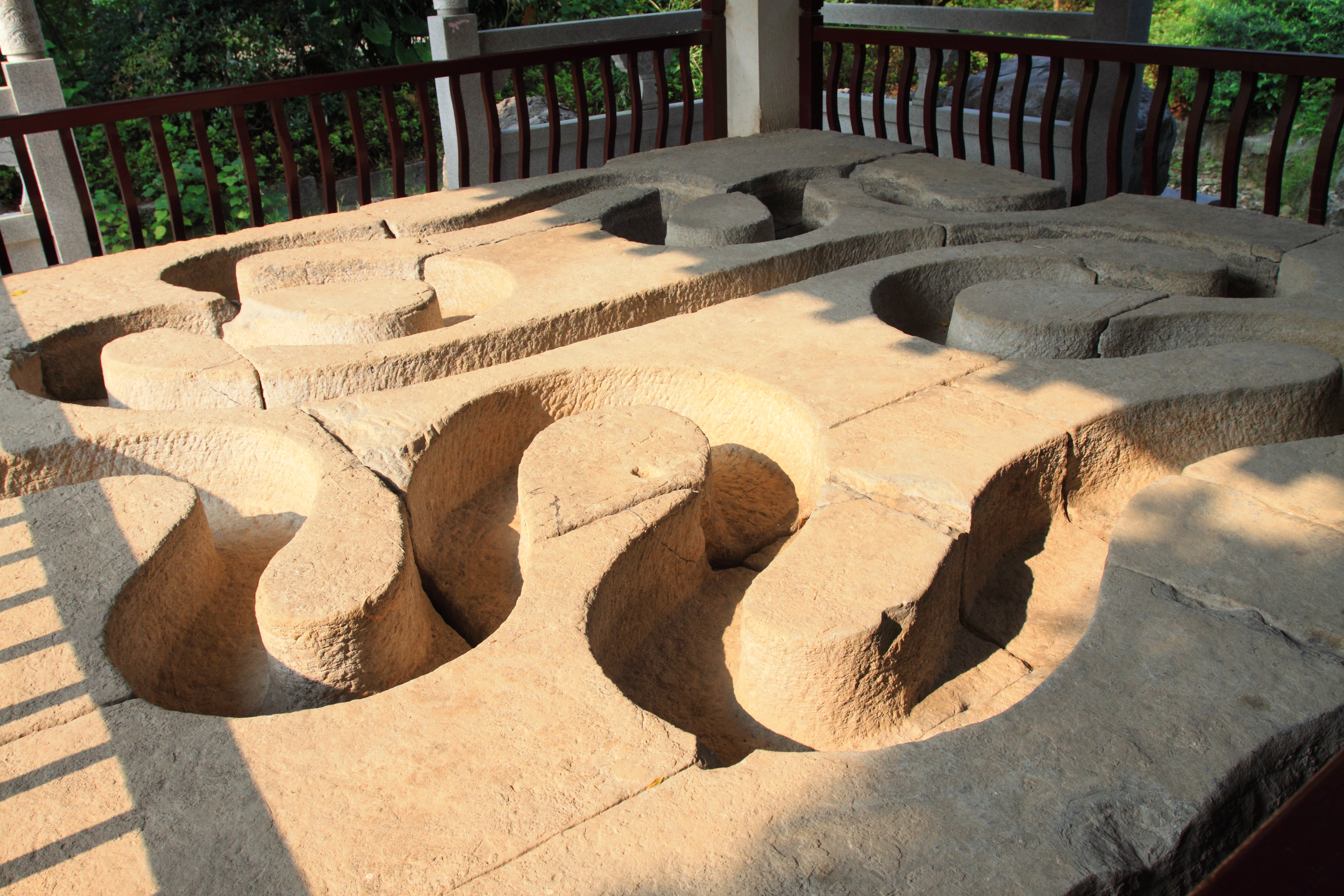
A Song dynasty winding stream party historic site located in Guilin, China

A winding stream party (Chinese: 流觴曲水/曲水流觴; pinyin: liúshāngqūshuǐ) is an old Chinese custom in which the participants wait by a winding stream and compose poems before their cups full of rice wine float down to reach them. It was popularized by Wang Xizhi, and dates back as far as 353; poems composed at this event were recorded in Wang's famous work, the Lantingji Xu.

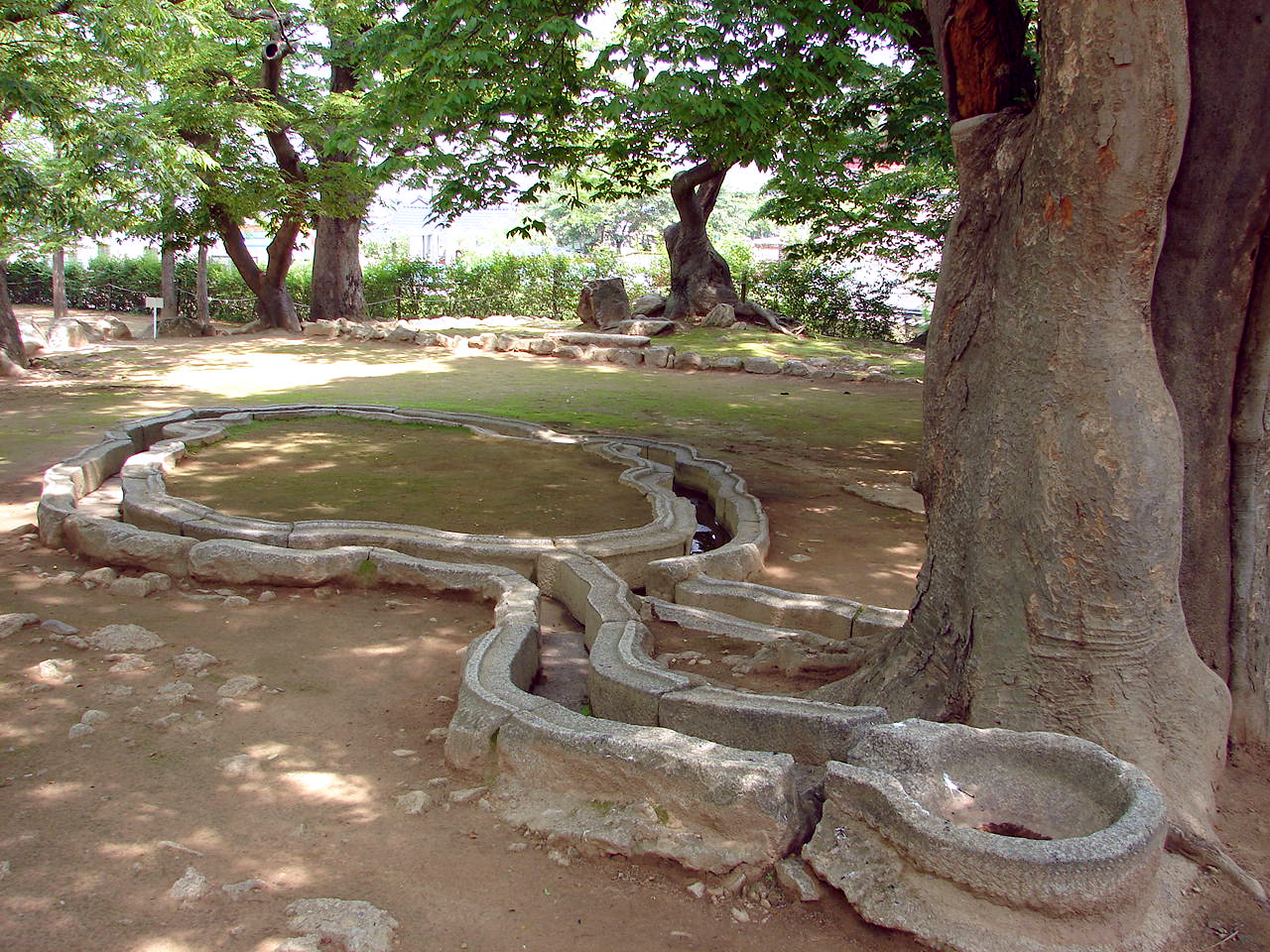
Poseokjeong ruins in Gyeongju, Korea

This Chinese custom was adopted by the Koreans, such as the party in 927, hosted by King Gyeongae of Silla, in Poseokjeong, Gyeongju.

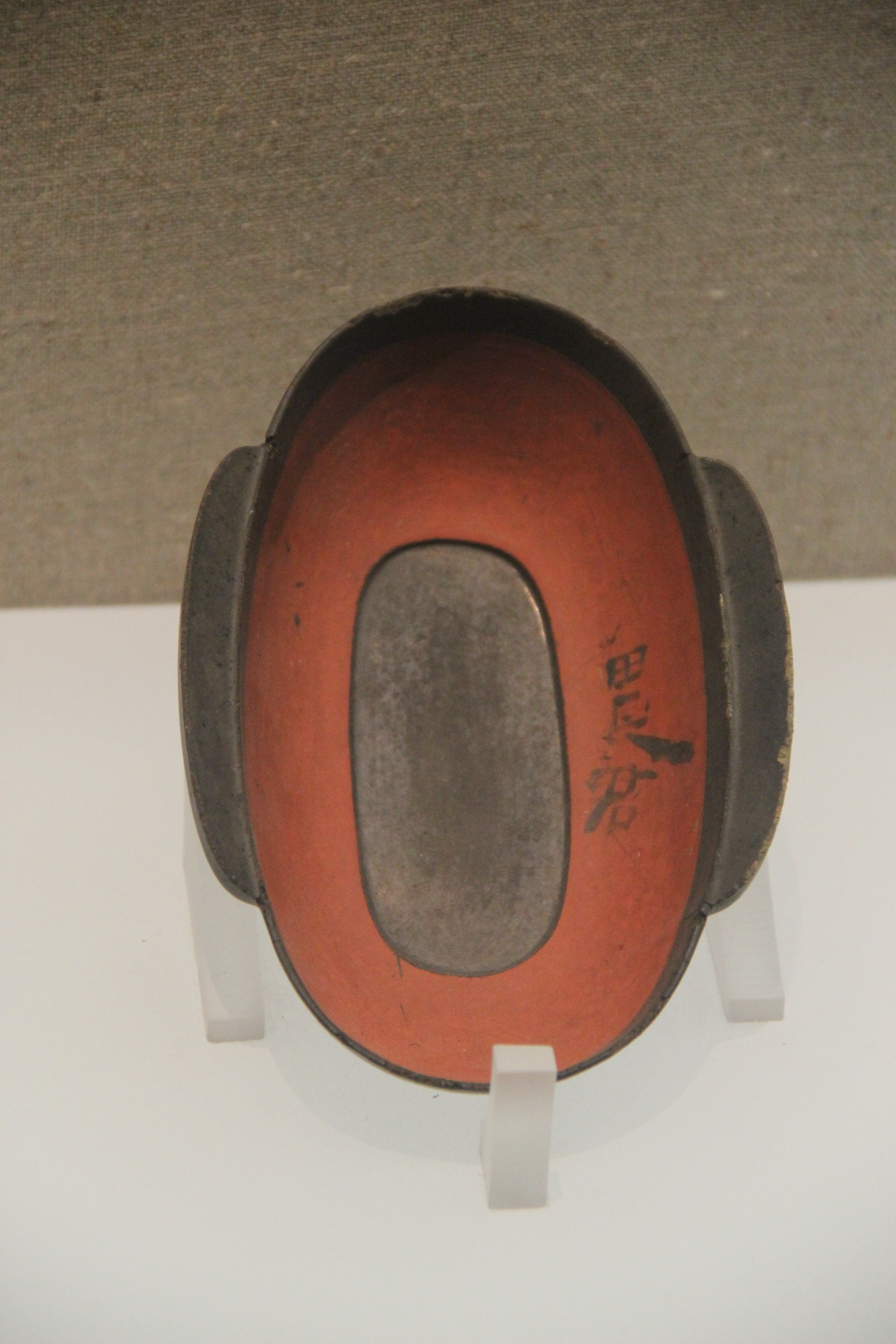
A Western Han lacquered wine cup.

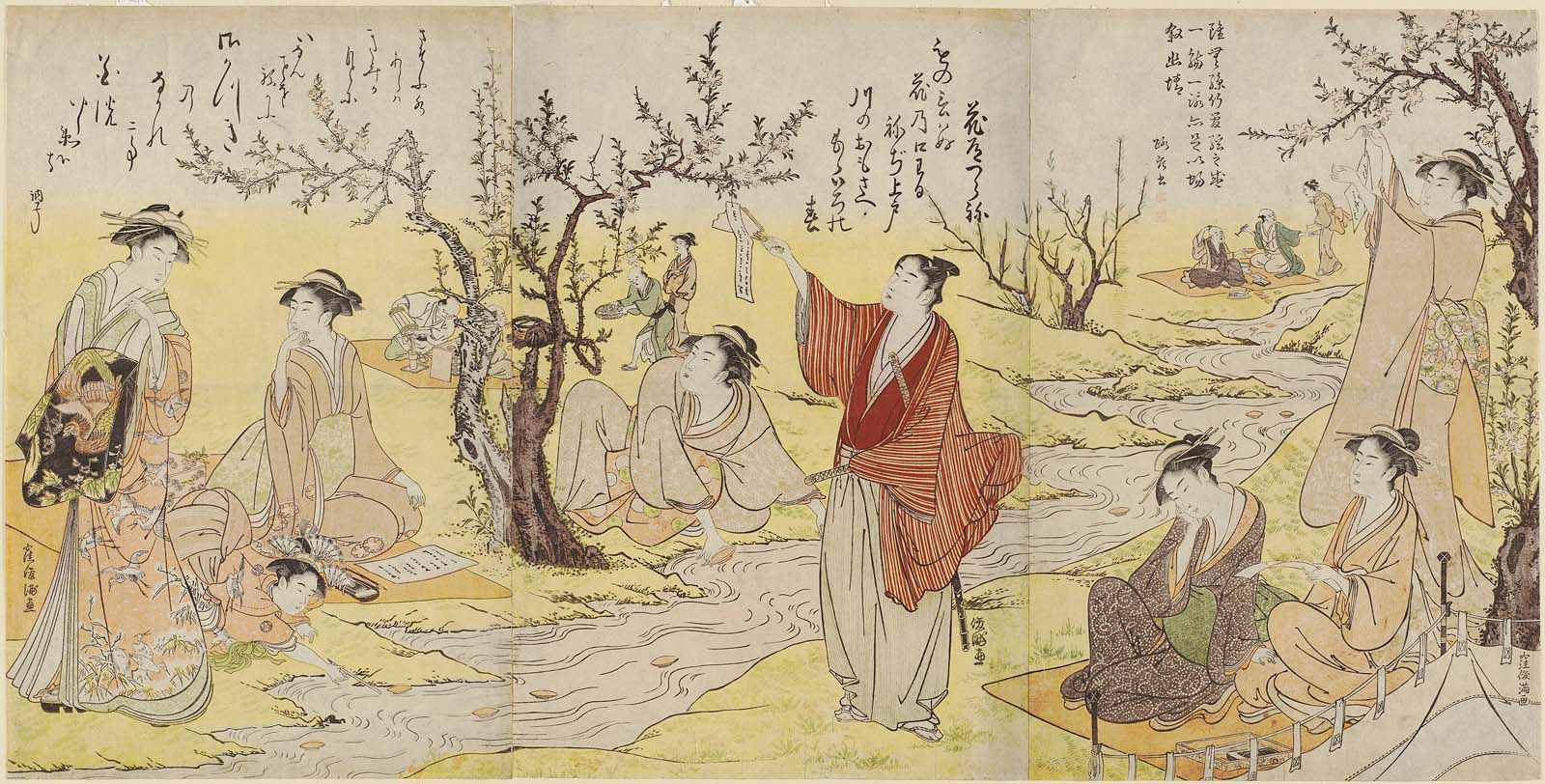
A Winding Stream Party (Kyokusui no en), print by Japanese artist Shunman

It was also adopted by the Japanese and was called Kyokusui-no-en (Japanese: 曲水の宴, Hepburn: Winding stream party), a party game played by the nobility. Participants must compose a tanka poem beside a stream, within a time limit set by the passage of a lacquer cup of sake floating towards them on the water. When the cup reached the poet, they were expected to drink its contents, either as a celebration of the poem's completion or as a forfeit if they had not composed a suitable verse in time. The first kyokusui-no-en events were reportedly held in the Kofun period during the reign of Emperor Kenzō, making the ceremony around 1,500 years old. Other sources, however, suggest that the game originated in the Heian period, around 500 years later; it appears in scrolls from that period and is mentioned in The Pillow Book of Sei Shōnagon.

The ceremony is still performed at the Tenman-gū Shrine in Dazaifu and also in Kyoto. The modern Japanese version of the ceremony was created in 1963; participants dress in Heian era costumes of the nobility and musical accompaniment is provided on the koto.
