= Phyllis Gomda Hsi =

Taiwanese vocalist (1938–2023)

- 席慕德
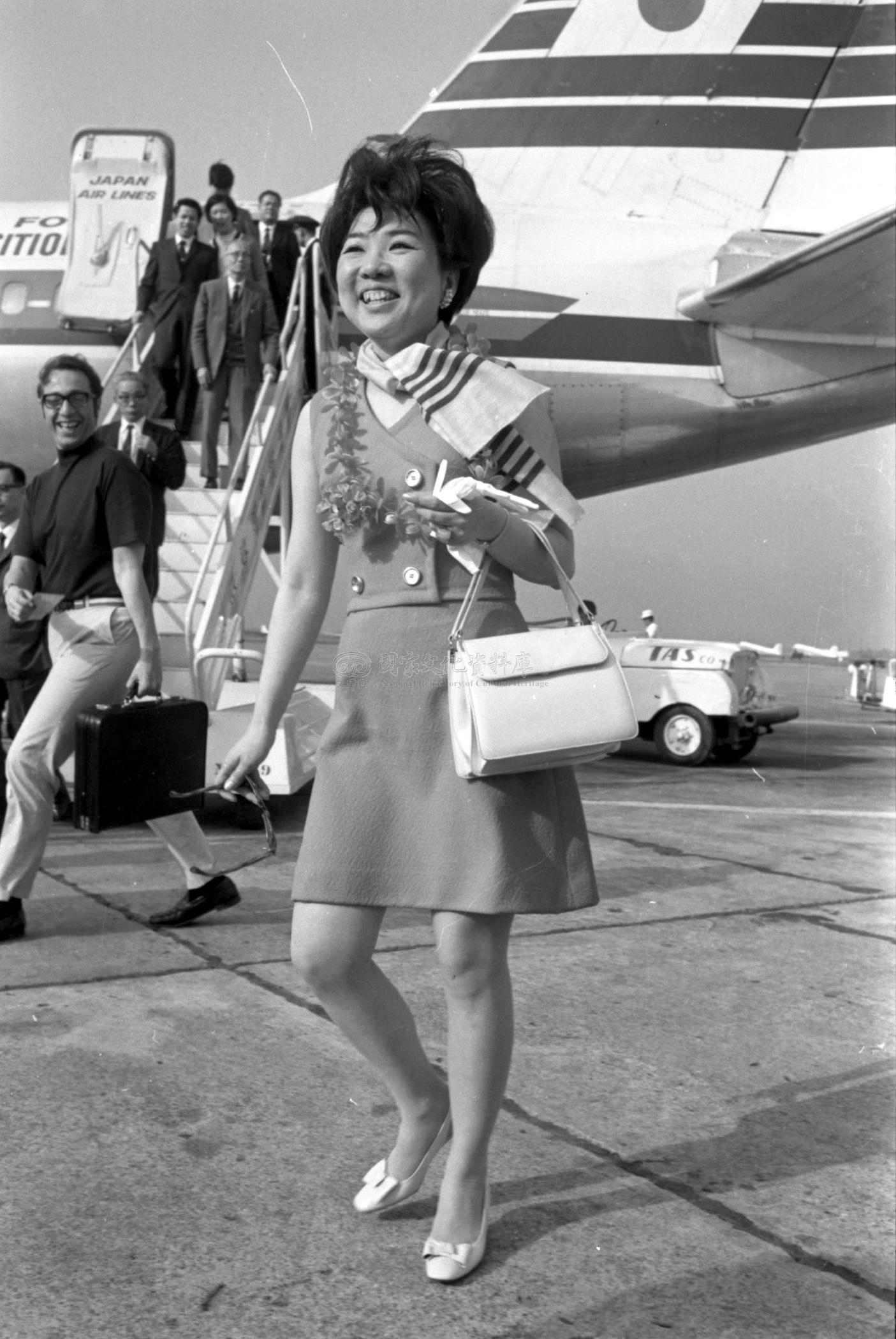
- Hsi in 1969
- Born: 3 March 1938; Beiping, China
- Died: 20 June 2023 (aged 85)
- Occupation: Music educator
- Years active: 1966–1980s (as performer); 1971–2003 (as educator)
- Father: Rashidonduk
- Relatives: Xi Murong (sister); Solungga Liu (niece)
- Musical career
- Genres: Lied
- Instrument: Vocals

Chinese name
- Chinese: 席慕德
Transcriptions
Standard Mandarin
- Hanyu Pinyin: Xí Mùdé
- Wade–Giles: Hsi2 Mu4-te2
Southern Min
- Hokkien POJ: Sit Bō͘-tiak

Phyllis Gomda Hsi (3 March 1938 – 20 June 2023) was a Taiwanese vocalist and music educator.

== Early life, family, and education ==
Hsi was born in Beiping (now Beijing) but spent her childhood in Hong Kong. An ethnic Mongol, Chahar Province, in Inner Mongolia, was her ancestral home. Her father was Rashidonduk (Hsi Chen-tuo), a member of the National Political Assembly from Chahar. Her sister is the writer and painter Xi Murong, and her niece is the pianist Solungga Liu.

In 1958, Hsi majored in vocal music and minored in piano at the Department of Music in National Taiwan Normal University. Being a prize student of professors Chiang Hsin-mei and Chang Tsai-hsien, she also studied music theory under professor Hsiao Erh-hua. In 1962, she was awarded a scholarship from the government of Germany and went on to study at the Hochschule für Musik und Theater München. After her graduation in 1966, she launched her performance career and became a soprano singer for the Theater Regensburg in Germany the following year.

== Career ==
In 1969 and 1971, Hsi was dispatched twice by the Goethe-Institut München to tour the German Art Songs (Lieder) Vocal Recital in Southeast Asian countries. This experience made her one of the first non-German artists who participated in cross-cultural exchange tours in Southeast Asia.

In 1971, Hsi returned to Taiwan and taught vocal music and German art songs at her alma mater, National Taiwan Normal University. She also taught at Soochow University and the Music Department of Chinese Culture University.

In 1975, Hsi engaged in advanced studies with Eleanor Steber in New York. In 1981, she recorded a solo album covering Western classical music and Chinese folk songs in the United States, which was catalogued at the New York Public Library for the Performing Arts.

In 1985, Hsi returned to her alma mater to lecture on vocal music, interpretation of German art songs, and singing voice. From 1999 to 2006, she served as the director of the Association of Vocal Artists of R.O.C for seven years. During her tenure, she devoted herself to promoting vocal music, including developing vocal music certification and holding competitions.

== Later life ==
After retiring from her full-time position at the music department of National Taiwan Normal University in 2003, Hsi continued to promote vocal music education. She published various types of works, including music essays, performance critiques, songbook compilations, and lyric translations, which became important reference materials for local vocal music students.

Hsi served as a judge for professional competitions both domestic and abroad, planned and produced music concerts, and published multiple articles in music magazines. These efforts played a significant role in promoting and advancing vocal music arts.

Hsi died on 20 June 2023 from complications of a fall, at the age of 85. She had moved to a nursing home earlier that month.
