= Orchid Pavilion Gathering =

Cultural and poetic event in China

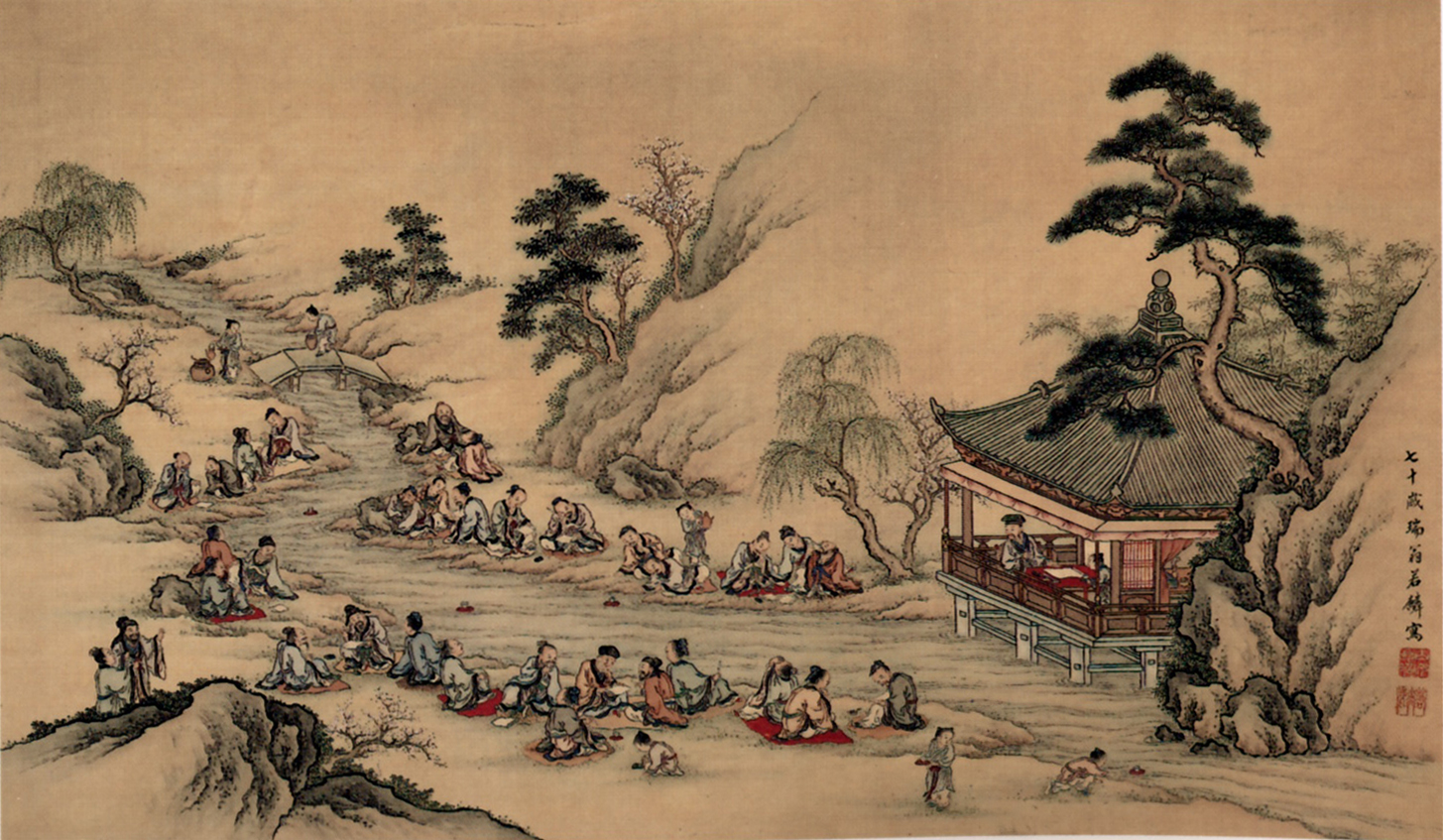
The Orchid Pavilion Gathering as depicted in an 18th-century Japanese painting

The Orchid Pavilion Gathering of 353 CE, also known as the Lanting Gathering, was a cultural and poetic event during the Jin dynasty (266–420) of the Six Dynasties era, in China. This event itself has a certain inherent and poetic interest in regard to the development of landscape poetry and the philosophical ideas of Zhuangzi. The gathering at the Orchid Pavilion is also famous for the artistry of the calligraphy of Wang Xizhi, who was both one of the participants, as well as the author and calligrapher of the Lantingji Xu (Preface to the Poems Composed at the Orchid Pavilion). Sun Chuo also wrote a preface, which is somewhat less famous.

The Orchid Pavilion Gathering of 42 literati included Xie An and Sun Chuo and Wang Pin-Chih at the Orchid Pavilion (Lanting) on Mount Kuaiji just south of Kuaiji (present-day Shaoxing in Zhejiang), during the Spring Purification Festival, on the third day of the third month, to compose poems and drink huangjiu. The gentlemen engaged in a drinking contest known as "floating goblets" (流觴; liúshāng): rice wine cups were floated down a small winding creek as the men sat along its banks; whenever a cup stopped, the man closest to the cup was required to empty it and write a poem. In the end, twenty-six of the participants composed thirty-seven poems.

== Modern influence ==
Aside from reproductions of the Lantingji Xu, other influences include the Orchid Pavilion Calligraphy College at Shaoxing University and Jay Chou's recording of a song by Vincent Fang entitled "Lántīng Xù" (蘭亭序, "Orchid Pavilion") from his 9th studio album Capricorn.

== Scroll copy of "Lantingji Xu" ==
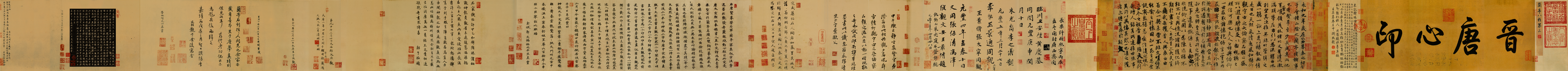
Lantingji Xu is Wang Xizhi's most famous work, which described the beauty of the landscape around the Orchid Pavilion and the meeting of Wang Xizhi and 41 literati friends. The original is lost. Some believed that it was buried with Emperor Taizong of the Tang dynasty in his mausoleum. This Tang era copy by Feng Chengsu (馮承素), dated between 627–650, is considered the best of all the subsequent copies. It is located in the Palace Museum in Beijing. The scroll is meant to read right to left.

== Gallery ==
The events of the Orchid Pavilion Gathering and the ensuing poems have inspired not only generations of poets, but also painters and other artists.

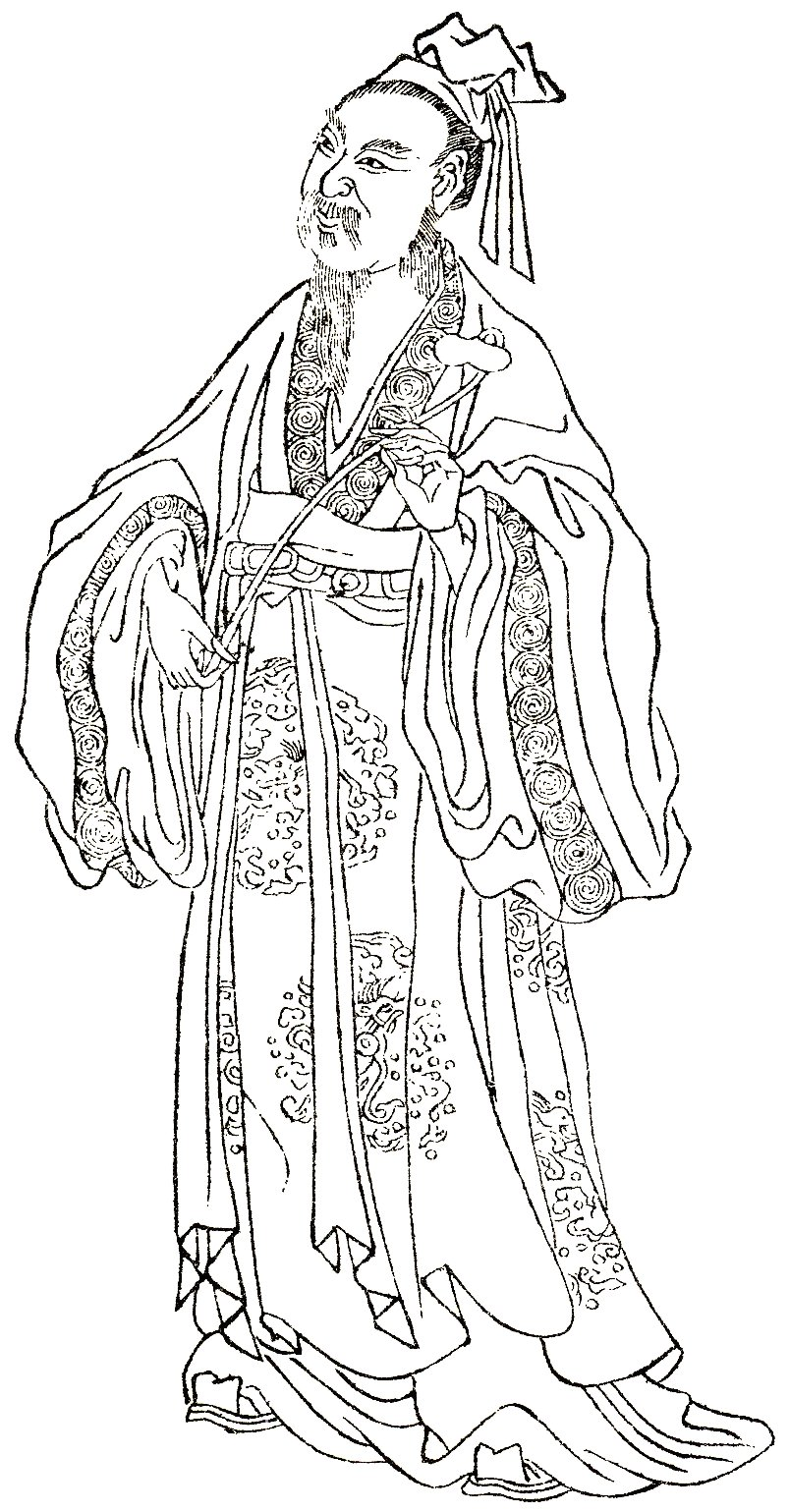
Wang Xizhi (王羲之) was a Chinese calligrapher, traditionally referred to as the "Sage of Calligraphy" (書聖). This image was carried on the book which is called "Wan hsiao tang-Chu chuang-Hua chuan (晩笑堂竹莊畫傳)" which was published in 1921 (民国十年).

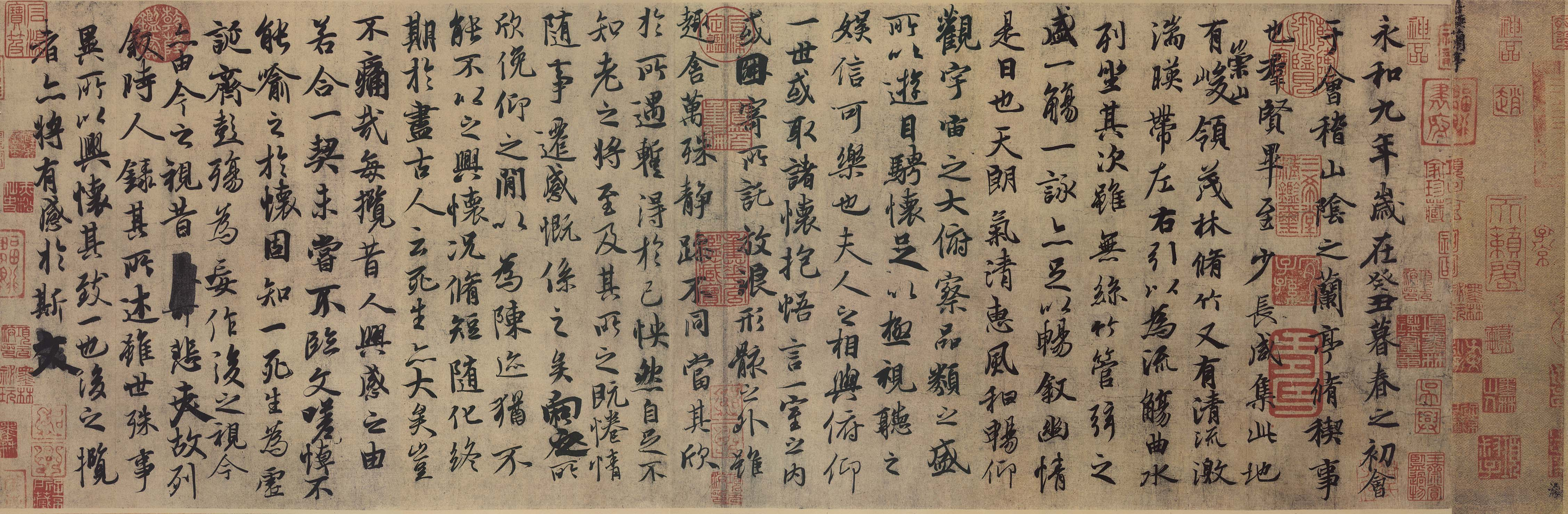
Main text of an early Tang Dynasty copy of Wang Xizhi's Lantingji Xu by Feng Chengsu (馮承素), located in the Palace Museum, Beijing. This is considered the best surviving copy. Many copies in Chinese history were made from a lost original possibly buried in Emperor Taizong's mausoleum.

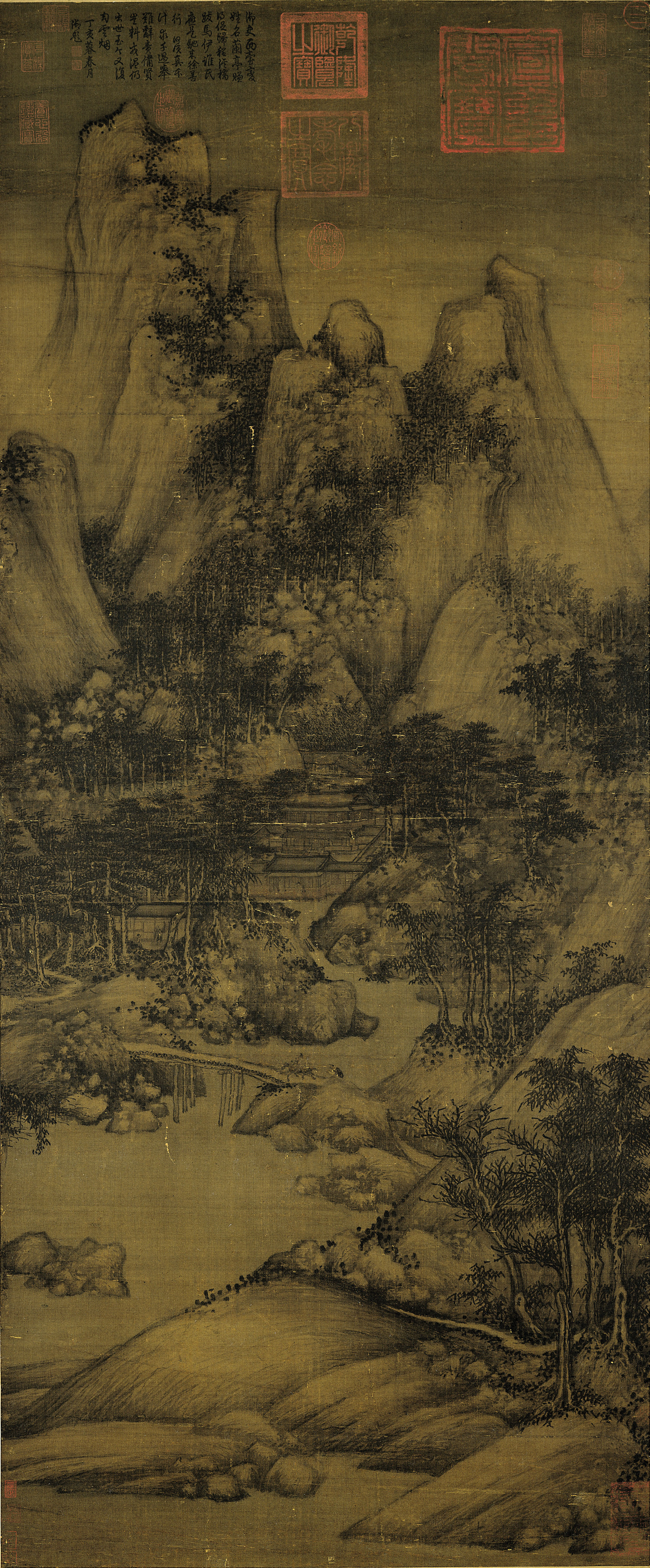
Juran – Xiao Getting the Orchid Pavilion Scroll by Deception.

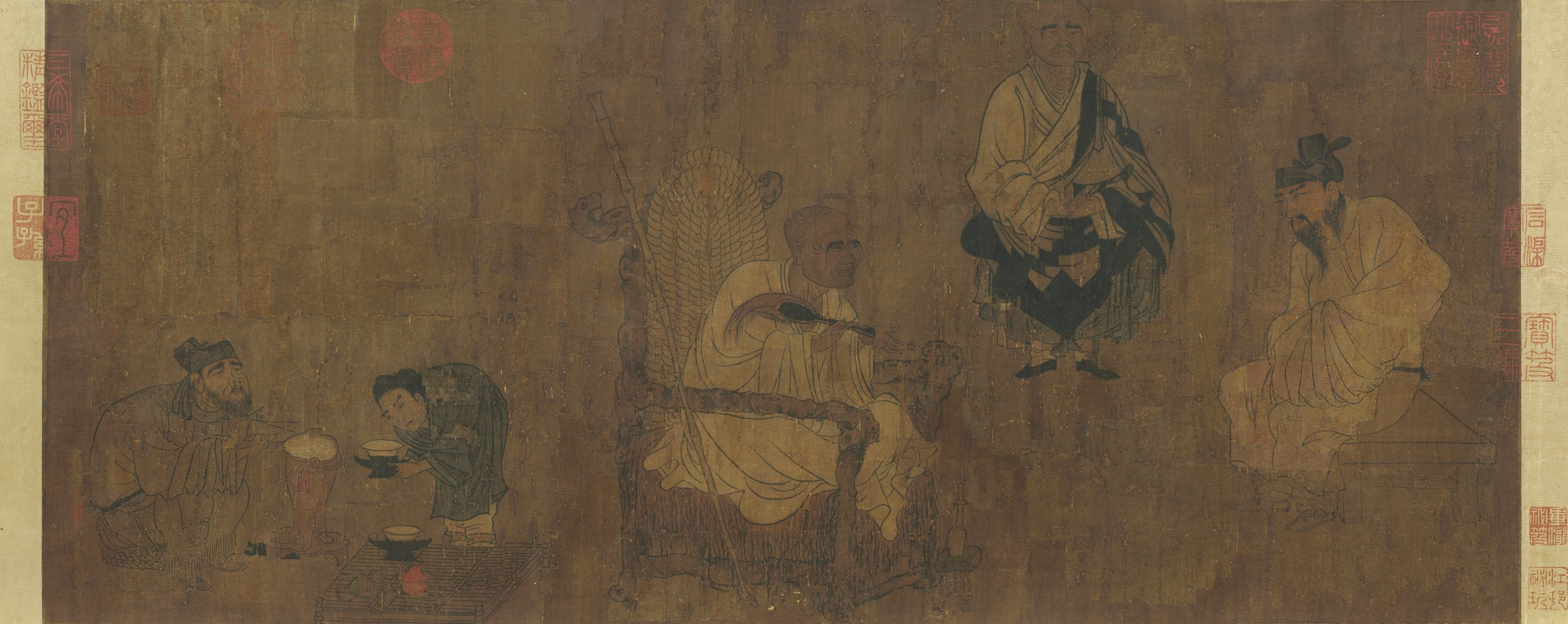
Xiao Yi Trying to Swipe the Lanting Scroll, Song (960–1279) copy of a Tang original painting.

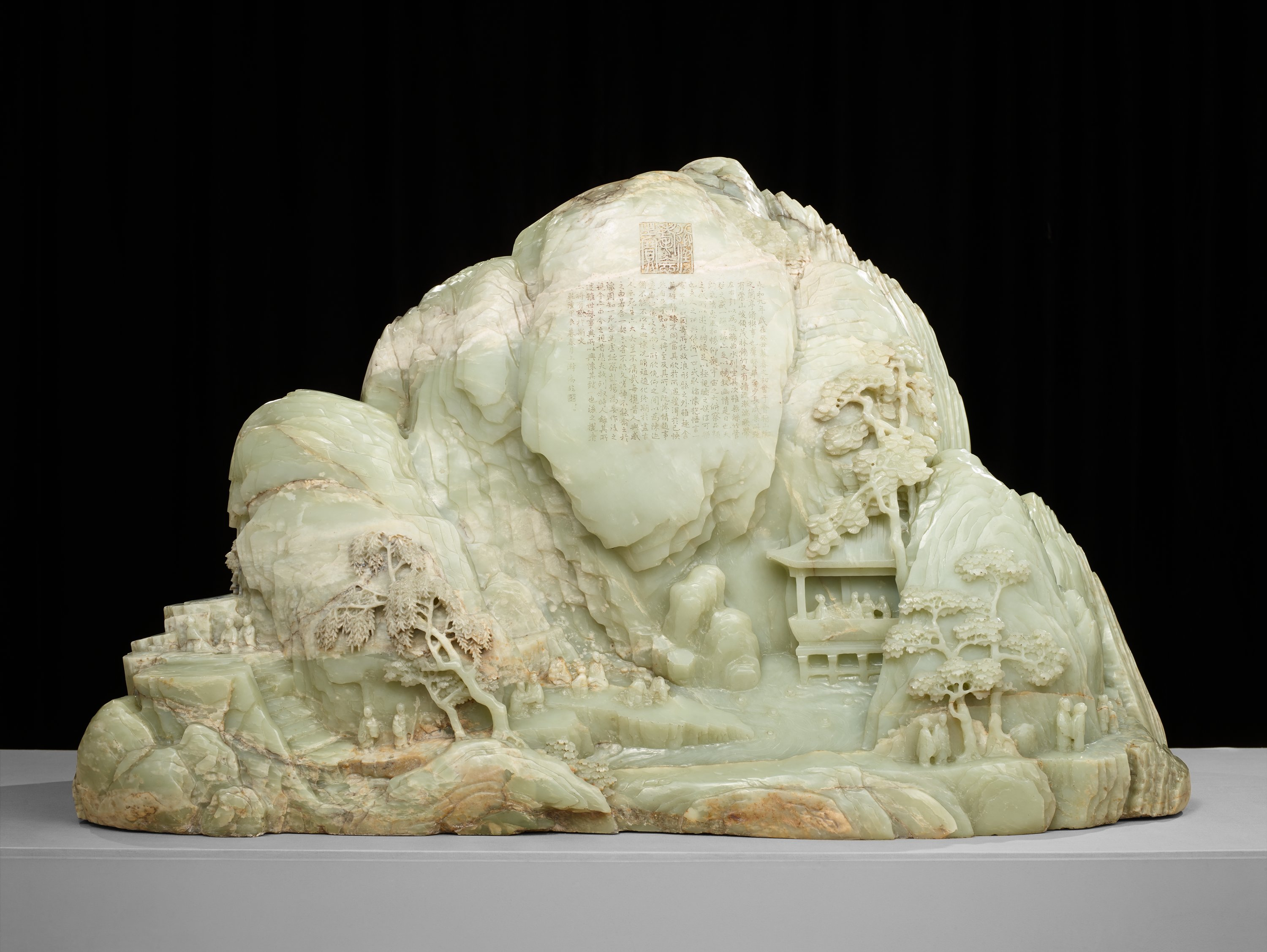
Jade Mountain Illustrating the Gathering of Scholars at the Lanting Pavilion, 1790 (Minneapolis Institute of Art)

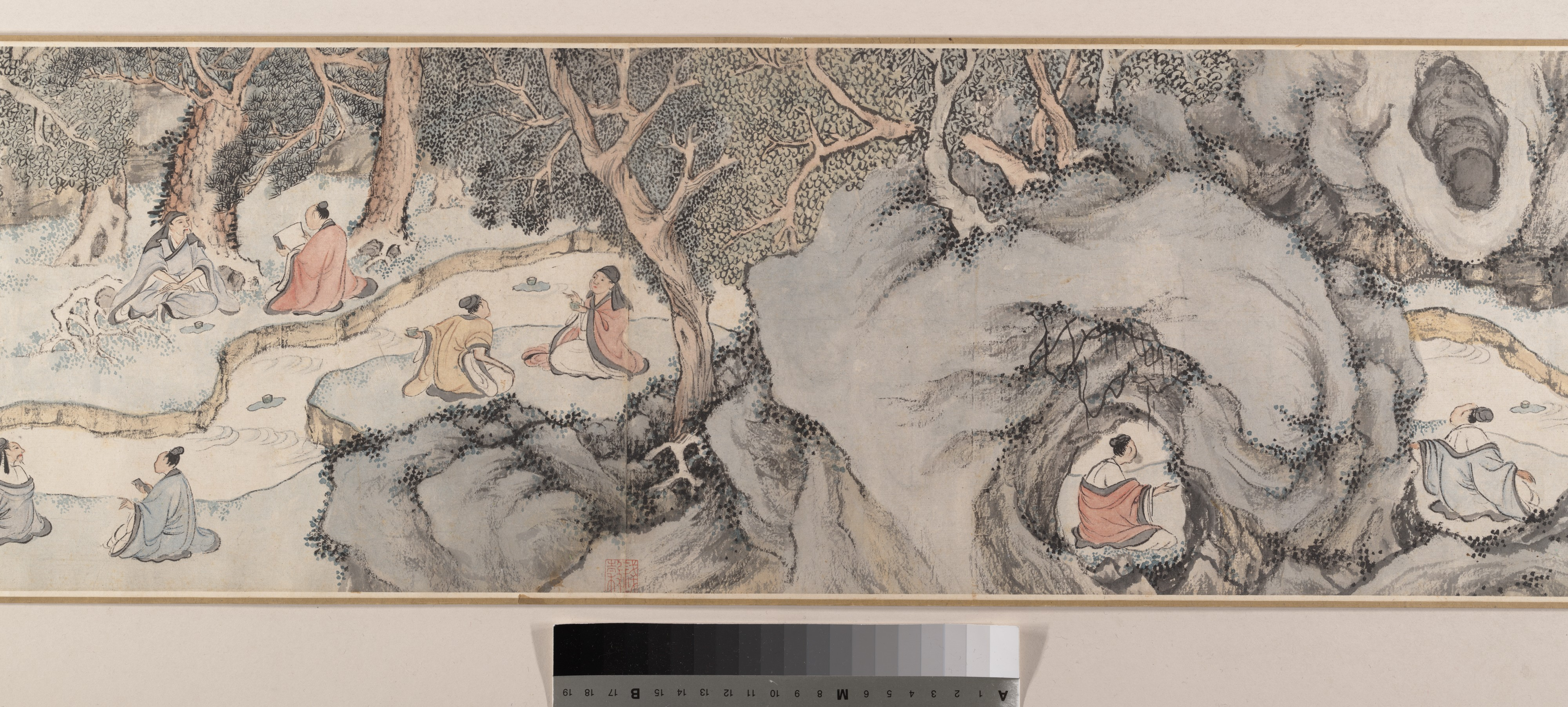
明 錢榖 蘭亭修禊圖 卷-"Gathering at the Orchid Pavilion" by Qian Gu, 1560 (MET DP204432)

== See also ==
- Admonitions Scroll
- History of graphic design
- Juran (painter)
- Lantingji Xu
- Orchidaceae
- Shangsi Festival
- Six Dynasties poetry
- Xie An
- Zhejiang
