= Roland Greene =

American literary scholar

- Born: 1957 (age 68–69)
- Spouse: Marisa Galvez
- Children: 1 daughter

Academic background
- Education: Brown University (BA); Princeton University (PhD)

Academic work
- Discipline: Comparative Literature, English
- Main interests: Early modern literature; poetry and poetics

Roland Greene (born 1957) is a scholar of the early modern literature and culture of England, Latin Europe, and the colonial Americas; and of poetry and poetics from the 16th century to the present. He is the Mark Pigott KBE Professor in the School of Humanities and Sciences at Stanford University. He serves as Director of the Stanford Humanities Center.

== Education ==
Greene attended Fairfax High School (Los Angeles). He obtained degrees at Brown University (BA) and Princeton University (PhD), and where he was a student of Earl Miner and Barbara Lewalski.

== Career ==
He began his professorial career at Harvard University as an Assistant and Associate Professor from 1984 to 1992. He served for six years as the Director of the Program in Comparative Literature at the University of Oregon, where he was Professor of Comparative Literature and English. He joined Stanford in 2001. Greene served as president of the Modern Language Association from 2015-2016, and is a member of the American Academy of Arts and Sciences.

Greene's writing about literature is characterized by its distinctive approaches, original theoretical models, and wide linguistic range. He is the author of Five Words: Critical Semantics in the Age of Shakespeare and Cervantes (2013), a study of the long sixteenth century in Europe and the Americas through the changes embodied in five common words across several languages; Unrequited Conquests: Love and Empire in the Colonial Americas (1999), which explores the social and political implications of love poetry in the first decades after the Columbian and Brazilian enterprises in the New World; and Post-Petrarchism: Origins and Innovations of the Western Lyric Sequence (1991), a study of fundamental issues in lyric poetics from Francis Petrarch's fourteenth-century Canzoniere to the late twentieth-century poetry of the Chilean Pablo Neruda and the Peruvian Martín Adán. Post-Petrarchism is probably best known for the influential theory of lyric presented in the introduction, where Greene proposes that lyric discourse exists between ritual and fictional phenomena and that the sequence as a form exploits these conditions.

Greene is the editor in chief of the Princeton Encyclopedia of Poetry and Poetics, 4th edition (2012).

== Personal life ==
Greene is married to Marisa Galvez, Professor of French and Italian and, by courtesy, of German Studies at Stanford, as of 2021. They have one daughter.
