= Lantingji Xu =

4th-century Chinese calligraphy

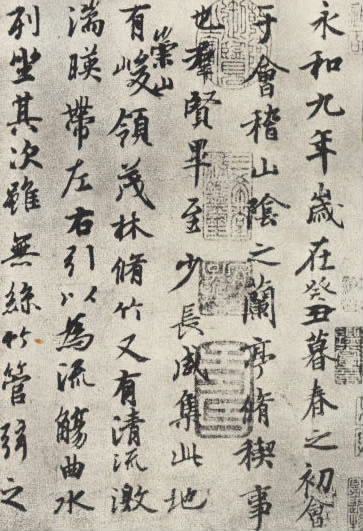
- Wang Xizhi's Lantingji Xu.
- Traditional Chinese: 蘭亭集序
- Simplified Chinese: 兰亭集序
- Literal meaning: Preface to the Poems Collected from the Orchid Pavilion
Transcriptions
Standard Mandarin
- Hanyu Pinyin: Lántíngjí Xù
Yue: Cantonese
- Yale Romanization: Làahntìhngjaahp Jeuih

The Lantingji Xu (traditional Chinese: 蘭亭集序; simplified Chinese: 兰亭集序; pinyin: Lántíngjí Xù; lit. 'Preface to the Poems Collected from the Orchid Pavilion'), or Lanting Xu ("Orchid Pavilion Preface"), is a piece of Chinese calligraphy work generally considered to be written by the well-known calligrapher Wang Xizhi (303–361) from the Eastern Jin dynasty (317–420).

In the ninth year of the Emperor Yonghe (353 CE), a Spring Purification Ceremony was held at Lanting, Kuaiji Prefecture (today's Shaoxing, Zhejiang Province), where Wang was appointed as the governor at the time. During the event, forty-two literati gathered along the banks of a coursing stream and engaged in a "winding stream" drinking contest: cups of wine were floated on the water downstream, and whenever a cup stopped in front of a guest, he had to compose a poem or otherwise drink the wine. At the end of the day, twenty-six literati composed thirty-seven poems in total and the Lantingji Xu, as a preface to the collection was produced by Wang on the spot. The original preface was long lost, but multiple copies with ink on papers or stone inscriptions remain until today.

== Form and content ==
The Lantingji Xu was written in the running (or semi-cursive) style on a cocoon paper with a weasel-whisker brush. It consists of 324 characters in 28 columns. The script of the Lantingji Xu was often celebrated as the high point of the running style in the history of Chinese calligraphy. The improvisational work demonstrated Wang's extraordinary calligraphy skill with the elegant and fluent strokes in a coherent spirit throughout the entire preface. The character Zhi (“之”) also appeared 20 times but was never written the same way.

Not only the aesthetic form of the manuscript is highly appreciated but also the transcendent sentiments expressed in the preface about life and death is a timeless classic. The preface starts off with a delightful description of the pleasant surroundings and the joyful ceremony, but carries on to reveal melancholy feelings towards how the transient delights brought by the vast universe would soon turn into retrospection. Wang reckoned the same emotion would be shared by the ancestors and his future generations even though the world and circumstances would be different. Scholars who study Wang, refer to his ideology expressed in the preface as a fusion of the Confucianism, Buddhism and Taoism.

== Original and copies of the Lantingji Xu ==
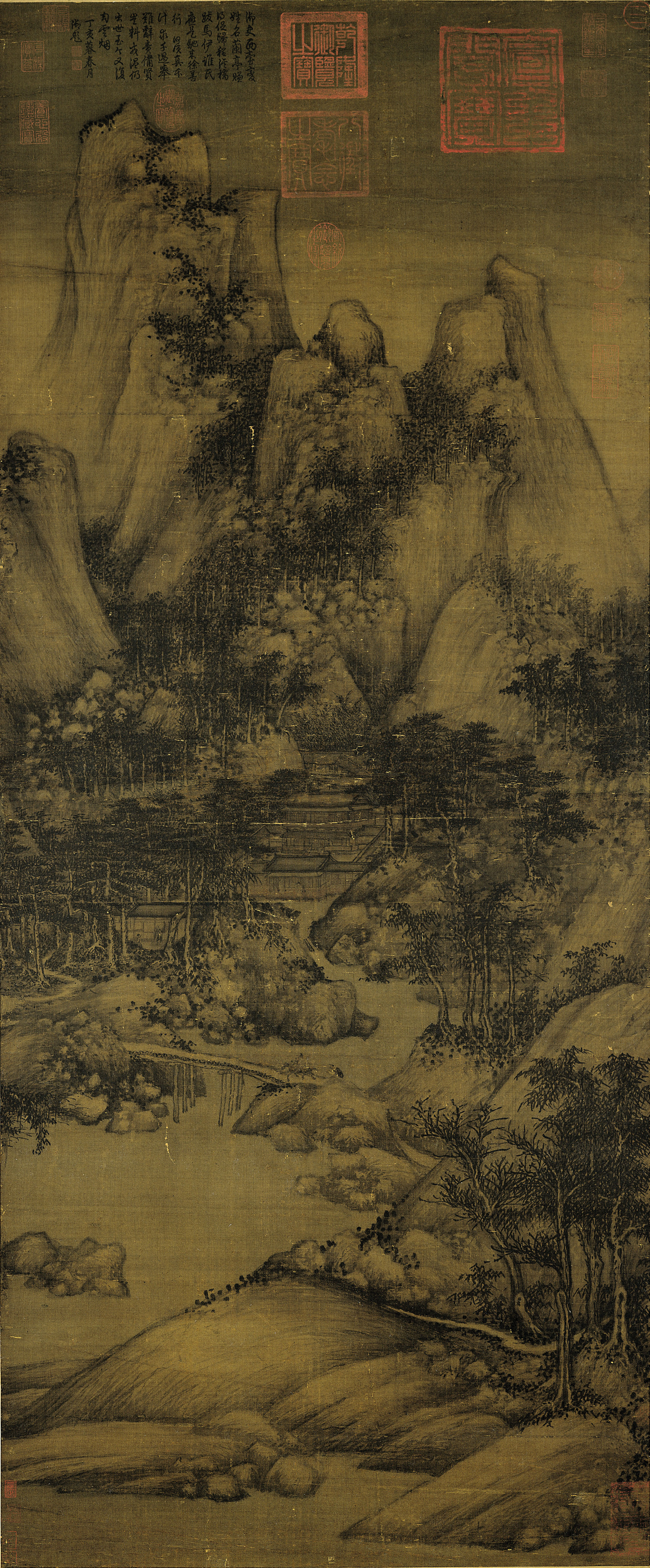
Figure 1 Juran, Xiao Yi Getting the Orchid Pavilion Scroll by Deception, 10th century, ink and colour on silk, 144.1 × 59.6 cm.

The original of the Lantingji Xu was told to be completed by Wang in the state of insobriety. Wang tried to rewrite the preface but failed to create the same sublime beauty as the first time. When it came to the reign of the second Emperor from the Tang dynasty (618–907), Emperor Taizong (598?–649) was an admirer of Wang's calligraphy and he had collected approximately two-thousand pieces of Wang's works. His tracking of the original Lantingji Xu became a widely circulated anecdote – the Emperor's senior court official Xiao Yi was tasked to acquire the original from Bian Cai, a monk who inherited Wang's Lantingji Xu from the friar Zhi Yong, the seventh grandson of Wang. Xiao managed to gain the trust from the monk and successfully spirited away the original work (Figure 1). The overjoyed Emperor shortly requested several court officials and calligraphers to copy the Lantingji Xu and upon Taizong's death, the original was said to have been buried together in his mausoleum in Shaanxi Province.

Today, among the existing copies of the preface, a few outstanding imitations were attributed to Feng Chengsu (617–672), Ouyang Xun (557–641), Yu Shinan (558–638) and Chu Suiliang (596–659) from the Tang dynasty. Feng's version, also called the Shenlong version (Figure 2), was regarded as the closest resemblance to the original. Feng, as the royal copyist, mastered the calligraphy tracing technique which was named Xiang Tuo. The method requires the copyist to stay in a dark room and stick the artwork against a window where the sunlight can shine through the paper to expose every detail of the characters; Another empty paper is then attached to the original piece to trace the outline of each stroke meticulously before filling in with ink. The Shenlong version is currently preserved at the Palace Museum in Beijing.

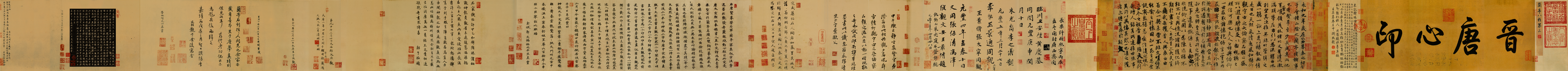
Figure 2: Lantingji Xu attributed to Feng Chengsu, Tang dynasty, ink on paper. Palace Museum in Beijing.

== Authenticity of the Lantingji Xu ==
Given that there is not a single piece of original work by Wang's own hand which has survived to our time, the authenticity of the Lantingji Xu has been a subject of controversy, particularly from the Qing Dynasty (1644–1912) onwards. In the 1960s, the debate about the authenticity of the Lantingji Xu was intensified along with discoveries of more calligraphy rubbings and antique documentations. Much of the debate upon the authenticity of the Lantingji Xu surviving manuscripts is based upon the historical development of Chinese script styles, and whether Wang Xizhi could have written in a calligraphic style which seems to be much more typical of running style script from a time centuries later than Eastern Jin. Some of the answers to questions about authenticity are approached through the means of examining Chinese rubbings from stones carved in various calligraphic styles. Typically the stone inscriptions last much longer than the paper versions, and so may contribute to the general understanding of Chinese script styles, and particularly the role or authenticity of Lantingji Xu as part of this process.

=== Questions of authenticity ===
Due to the loss of the original Lantingji Xu, questions have been raised as to whether the surviving copies are true copies, or based on a mere reconstruction. The voice of forgery, with a key representative Guo Moruo (1892 – 1978), the first President of the Chinese Academy of Sciences, claims the Running Style only matured after the Tang dynasty as the artworks and records around the Han to Jin Dynasty imply a heavy dependence of using the Clerical script (evolved around 300 BCE) instead of the Running style, such examples include the stone inscriptions demonstrated in Figure 3 and 4. Moreover, the earliest anecdotes collection in China Shishuo Xinyu (“A New Account of Tales of the World”), annotated by writer Liu Xiaobiao (463 – 521), asserted that the preface written by Wang was actually named Linhe Xu (“The Preface to the Riverside Gathering”). The content of the Linhe Xu recorded in the Shishuo Xinyu, comparing with the Lantingji Xu manuscript, was shortened by a hundred and sixty-seven characters in the middle paragraph but added on forty more characters at the end. Guo also stated that the emotions manifested in the preface were overly pessimistic for an aristocrat so that it was not a true reflection of Wang's temperament. As a result, by the early 1970s, the conclusion was almost reached that the Lantingji Xu scroll was a work forged by Wang's descendant.

=== Role of rubbings ===
Reproduction of inscriptions on stone (or other depictions on other hard surfaces) through a process of rubbing at the surface, using a combination of ink and paper or other absorbent material, has a long history in China, and has been central to cultural preservation and understanding, including the Lantingji Xu. The discussion around the Orchid pavilion preface, revived from the 1980s, with supporters of Wang's Langtingji Xu countering the above arguments with rubbing examples such as Figures 5 and 6, suggesting the formation of the Running Style was already complete before Wang's time. In addition, since the preface was attributed by the later ages to Wang, it is not surprising that more than one name may exist pointing to the same work. In fact, before Liu Xiaobiao's annotations, the earlier version of the Shishuo Xinyu compiled by the first editor Liu Yiqing (403 – 444) was already referring to the preface by Wang as Lantingji Xu The revision of the content may also be understood as a common practice applied in historical annotated books like the Shishuo Xinyu. When it comes to Wang's ideology, by the time the preface was created, Wang was in his early fifties and had experienced chaos of the wars and the disintegration of his nation. Hence, some scholars proposed that rather than pessimism, the content should be explained as a reflection of Wang's Confucian, Buddhist and Taoist influences instead. These arguments, as a result, led to a broader modern recognition that the Lantingji Xu was originally produced by Wang.

Figure 3 Yanxi, details of Huashanmiao, Han dynasty, stone rubbing. Collection of Hong Kong Chinese University (Clerical Script)	Figure 4 Details of Cuanbaizi, 405 CE, stone rubbing. (Transition between the Clerical Script and Regular Script)	Figure 5 Zhongyao, details of Hejie Biao, 219 CE, stone rubbing. (Running Style)	Figure 6 Zhangzhi, Guanjun Tie, 2nd century, stone rubbing. (Cursive Style)

== Text translation ==
永和九年，歲在癸丑，暮春之初，	In the ninth year of Yonghe, at the onset of late spring,
會于會稽山陰之蘭亭，修禊事也。	we have gathered at the Orchid Pavilion in the North of Kuaiji Mountain for the purification ritual.
群賢畢至，少長咸集。	All the literati, the young and the aged, have congregated.
此地有崇山峻嶺，茂林修竹；	This location has high mountains and steep hills, dense woods, and tall bamboo,
又有清流激湍，映帶左右。	as well as a clear, limpid stream reflecting the surroundings.
引以為流觴曲水，列坐其次；	We sit by a redirected stream, allowing the wine goblets to float beside us on its winding course.
雖無絲竹管絃之盛，	Although without the accompaniment of music,
一觴一詠，亦足以暢敘幽情。	the wine and poem reciting are sufficient for us to exchange our feelings.
是日也，天朗氣清，惠風和暢。	On this day, the sky is clear, the air is fresh, and a gentle breeze is blowing.
仰觀宇宙之大，	Looking up, we admire the vastness of the universe;
俯察品類之盛；	looking down, we see the myriad works of poetry.
所以遊目騁懷，足以極視聽之娛，信可樂也。	Letting the gaze wander and the mind roam, one can fully enjoy the pleasures of sight and sound, truly a delight.
夫人之相與，俯仰一世，	People's interactions with each other quickly pass through a lifetime.
或取諸懷抱，晤言一室之內；	Some would share their ambitions in a chamber;
或因寄所託，放浪形骸之外。	others may freely indulge in diverse interests and pursuits.
雖趣舍萬殊，靜躁不同；	The choices are plenty and our temperaments vary.
當其欣於所遇，暫得於己，怏然自足，	We enjoy the momentary satisfaction of pleasures that regale us,
不知老之將至。	yet we hardly realize how swiftly we age.
及其所之既倦，情隨事遷，感慨係之矣。	As desires fade and circumstances change, grief arises.
向之所欣，俛仰之間，已為陳跡，	What previously gratified us will soon be a relic,
猶不能不以之興懷；	we cannot help but mourn.
況修短隨化，終期於盡。	Whether life is long or short, there is always an end.
古人云：	As the ancients said,
「死生亦大矣。」	"Death and birth are momentous."
豈不痛哉！	How agonizing!
每覽昔人興感之由，若合一契；	Reading the past compositions reveals a consistent melancholy from the ancients.
未嘗不臨文嗟悼，不能喻之於懷。	One may find themselves lamenting in response to their words, unable to articulate their feelings.
固知一死生為虛誕，	It is absurd to equate life with death,
齊彭殤為妄作。	and it is equally foolish to think that longevity is the same as the short-lived.
後之視今，	The future generations will look upon us,
亦猶今之視昔，	just like we look upon our past.
悲夫！	How sad!
故列敘時人，錄其所述；	Hence, we record the people presented here today and their works;
雖世殊事異，	Even though time and circumstances will be different,
所以興懷，其致一也。	the feelings expressed will remain unchanged.
後之覽者，亦將有感於斯文。	Future readers shall find the same empathy through this collection of poems.

== See also ==
- Wang Xizhi
- Chinese Calligraphy
- Classical Chinese poetry
- Six Dynasties poetry
- Orchid Pavilion Gathering
- Kyokusui-no-en

== Gallery ==
Photographic resources related to the Lantingji Xu.

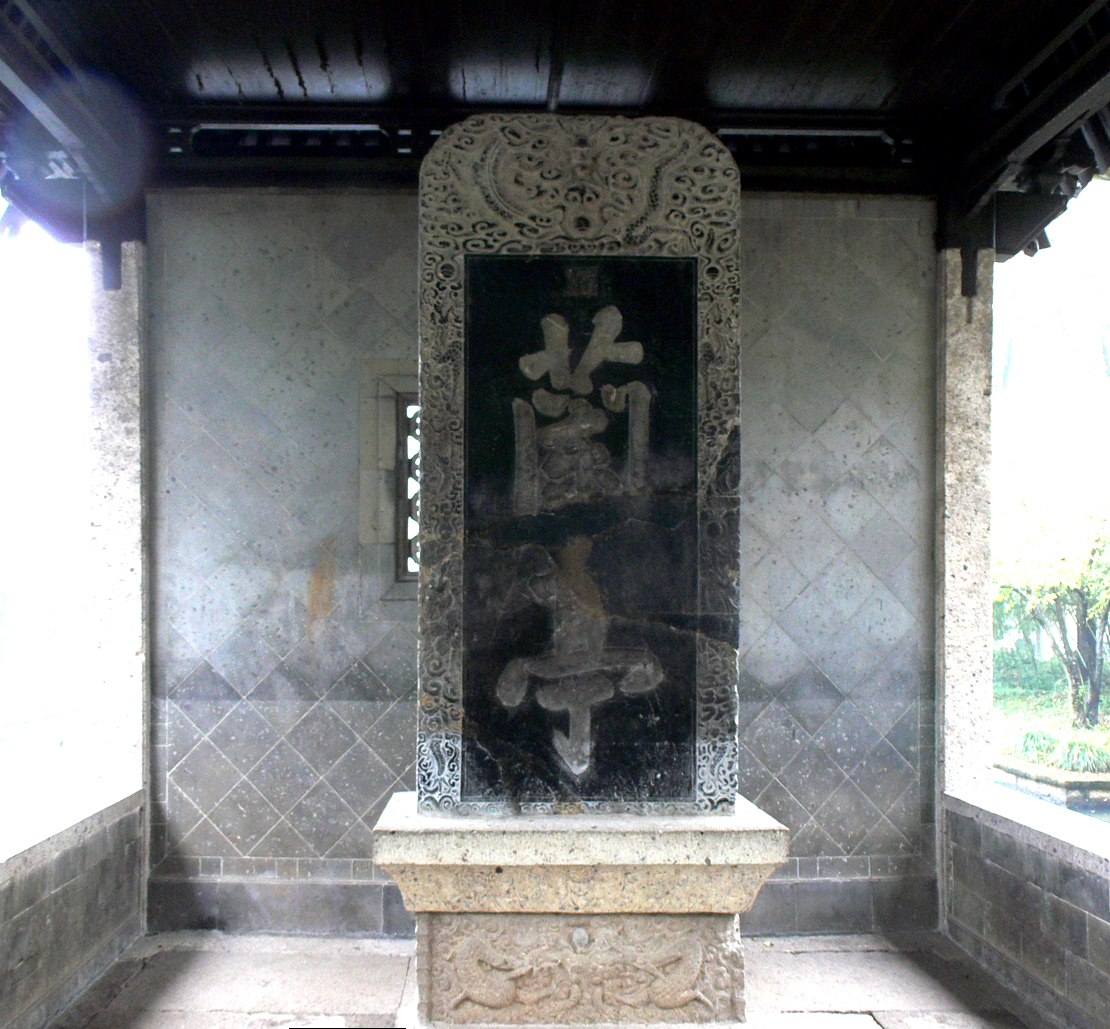
Kangxi Emperor, "Lanting tablet", Qing dynasty, stone inscription.

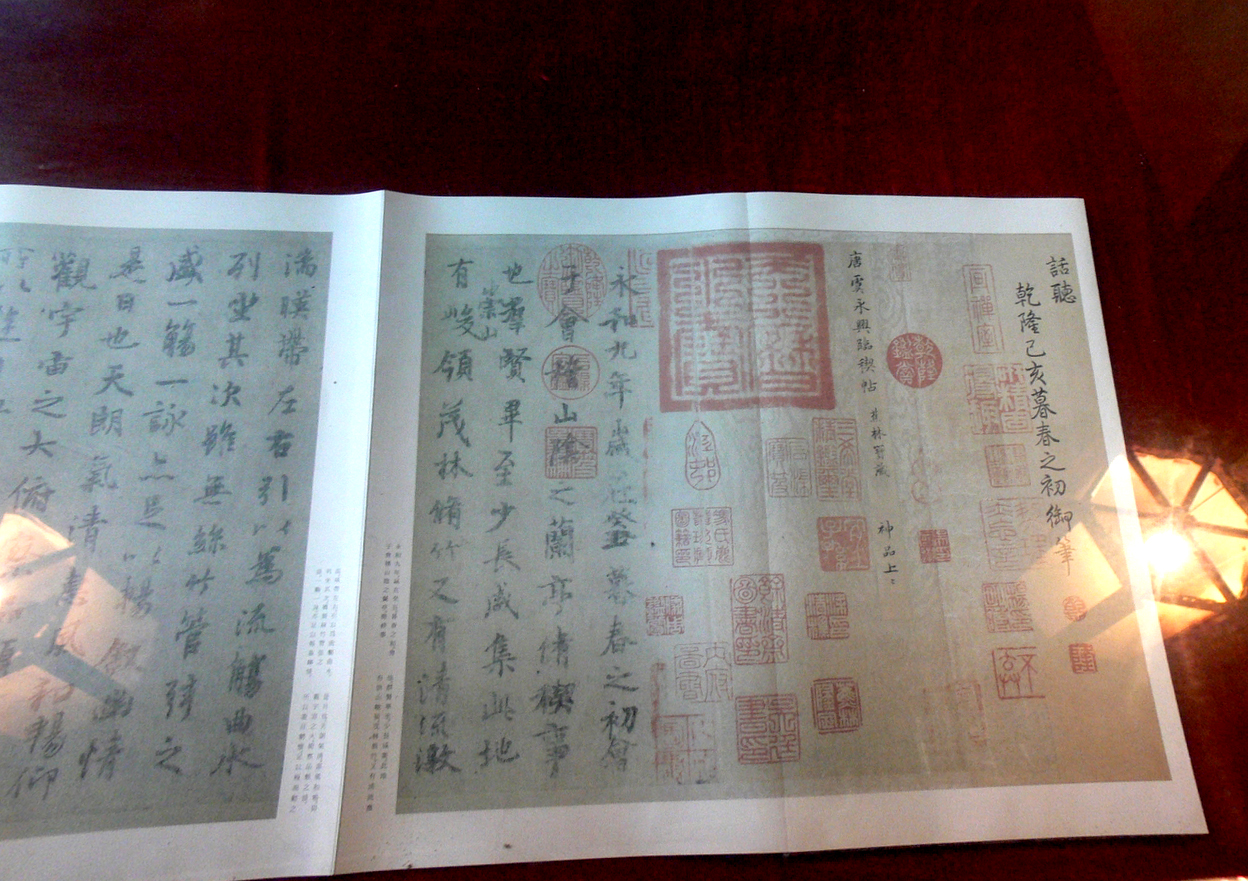
Emperor Qianlong, "Qianlong's Autograph to the Lantingji Xu", Qing dynasty, print.

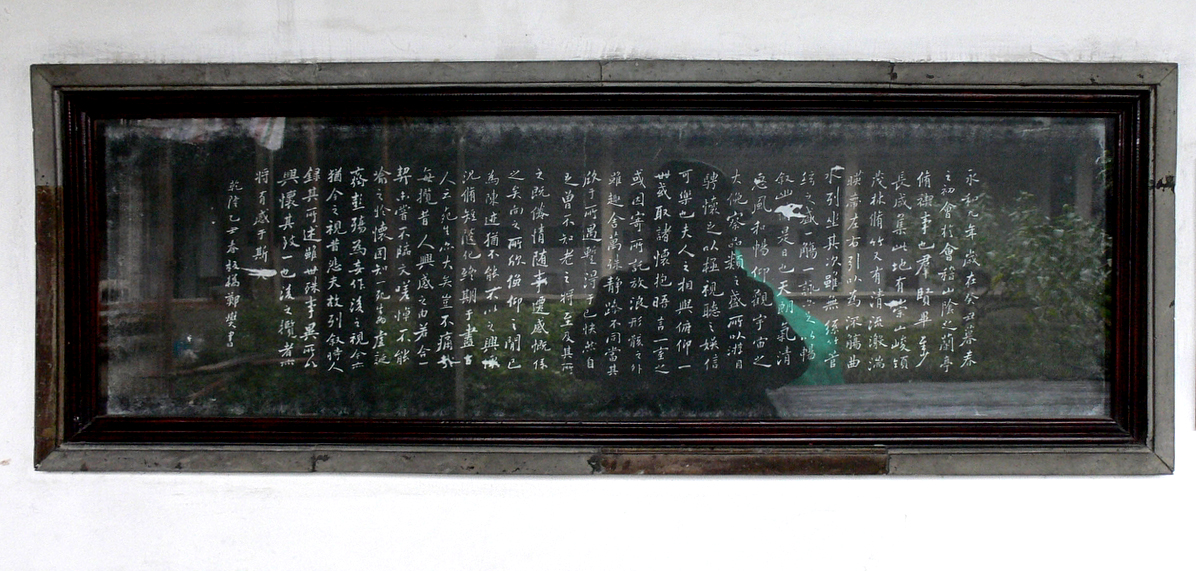
Zheng Banqiao, "Calligraphy Tablet: the Lantingji Xu", Qing dynasty, stone inscription.

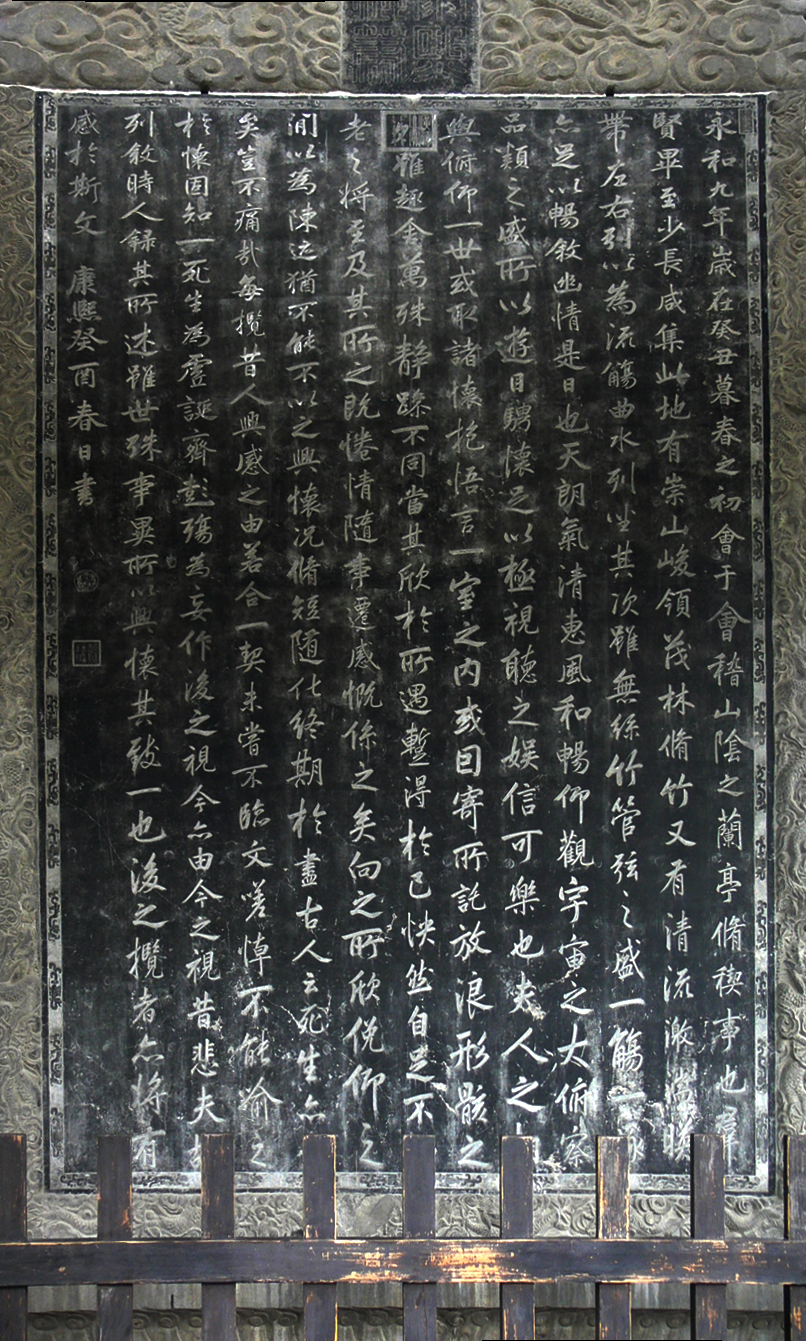
Kangxi Emperor, "Copy of the Lantingji Xu", Qing dynasty, stone inscription.

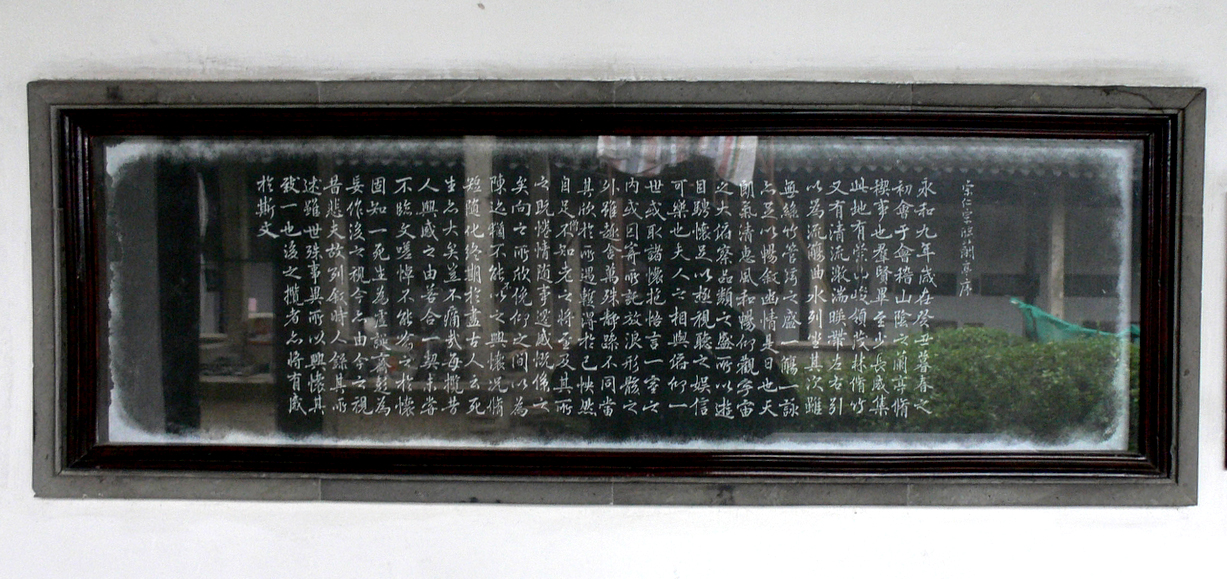
Emperor Renzong of Song, Copy of the Lantingji Xu, Song dynasty, stone inscription.

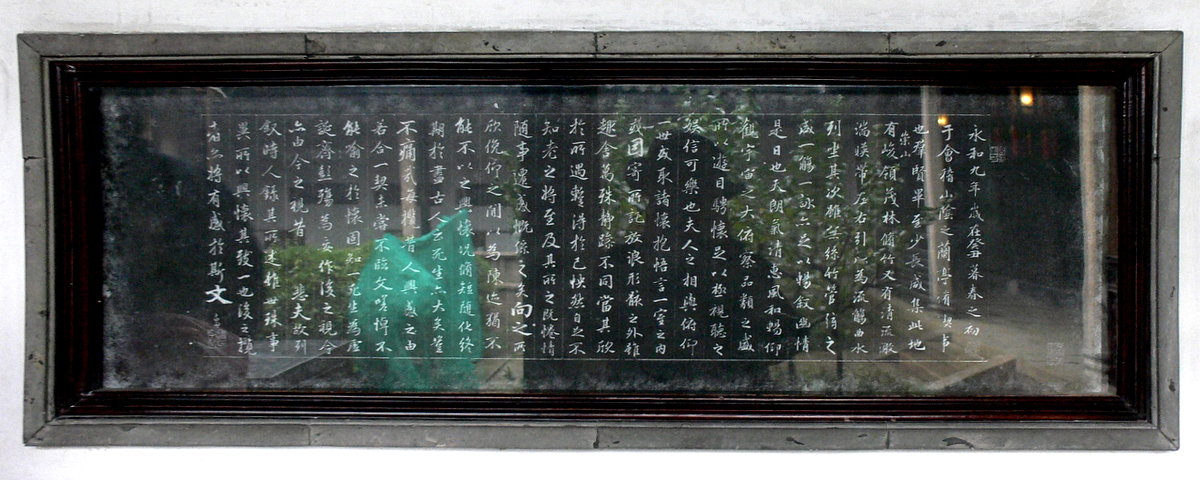
Zhao Mengfu, "Copy of the Lantingji Xu", Yuan dynasty, stone inscription.

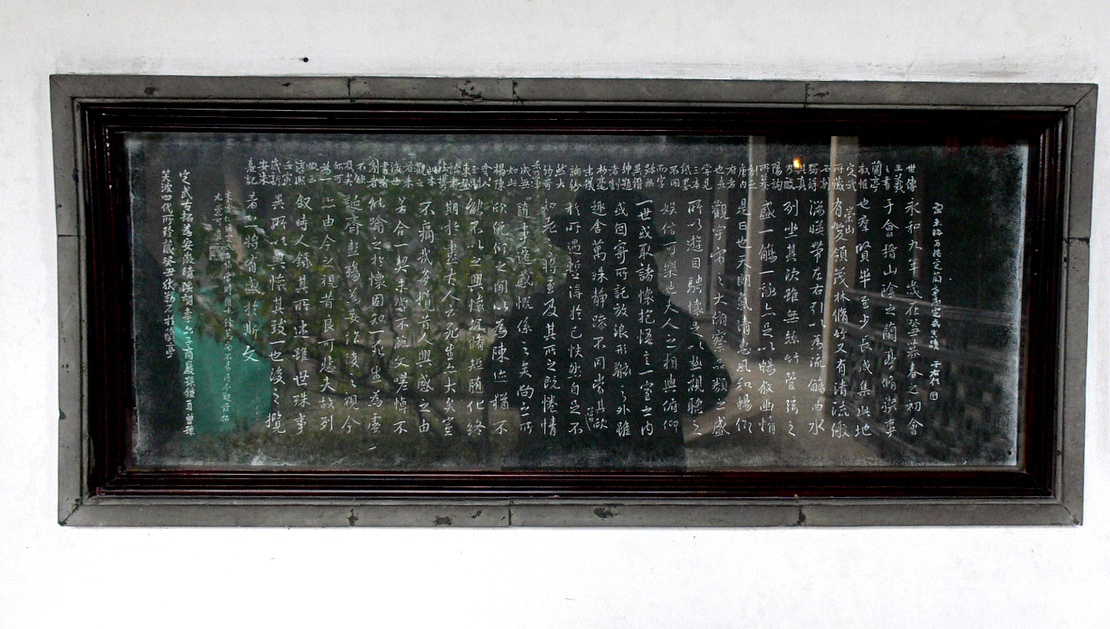
Zhu Xi, "Copy of the Lantingji Xu", Song dynasty, stone inscription.
