= Huang Ling-chih =

Taiwanese writer and sculptor

Huang Ling-chih (Chinese: 黃靈芝) (1928–2016) was a Taiwanese writer and sculptor born in Tainan, Taiwan. Huang Ling-chih wrote in Japanese, and his works spanned a wide range of genres, including haiku, short poems, poetry, fiction, essays, and criticism. In 1951, he began submitting his works to the literary section of the Japanese-language newspaper Military and Civilian Reports (軍民導報), where he met other modern poets. He went on to join Taiwanese haiku societies. In 1970, Huang Ling-chih founded the Taipei Haiku Association and served as its president, publishing an annual anthology called Taipei Haiku Collection (臺北俳句集).

From 1992 to 1993, he taught a Chinese haiku class, where he promoted his own haiku style, called "Taiwan Haiku" (灣俳). This style was an attempt to create a new form of poetry outside of modern poetry, influencing the development of free verse in Taiwan. In 2003, he published Taiwan Haiku Calendar (台灣俳句歲時記). He received awards such as the 1st Wu Chuo-liu Literary Prize and the 3rd Masaoka Shiki International Haiku Award. For his long-term promotion of Japanese culture, he was awarded the Order of the Rising Sun, Gold Rays with Rosette in 2006 by the Emperor of Japan.

In addition to his writing, Huang Ling-chih also studied sculpture with Taiwanese sculptor Pu Tian-shen (蒲添生). In 1962, his sculpture Blind Girl was selected for the International Youth Art Exhibition in Paris, France. In 1963, Blind Girl won the first prize at the 17th Taiwan Provincial Fine Arts Exhibition.

Japanese scholar Professor Ikuko Okazaki (岡崎郁子) praised Huang Ling-chih for his continuous work in Japanese across various genres, including haiku, short poems, poetry, fiction, essays, and criticism, describing him as one of the most outstanding writers in post-war Taiwan, exhibiting literary qualities that others cannot easily match.

Juan Wen-ya (阮文雅), who translated Selected Novels of Huang Ling-chih (黃靈芝小說選) for the Tainan City Government Cultural Bureau, has said that “Huang Ling-chih's unique genius and rebellious spirit, deliberately challenging the imaginative boundaries of the reader. The works are seen as a satire of modern civilization, making them enduring and timeless, a distinctive feature of Huang's literary works.”
