= Xi Murong =

Taiwanese women poet, painter and writer (born 1943)

Xi Murong 席慕蓉
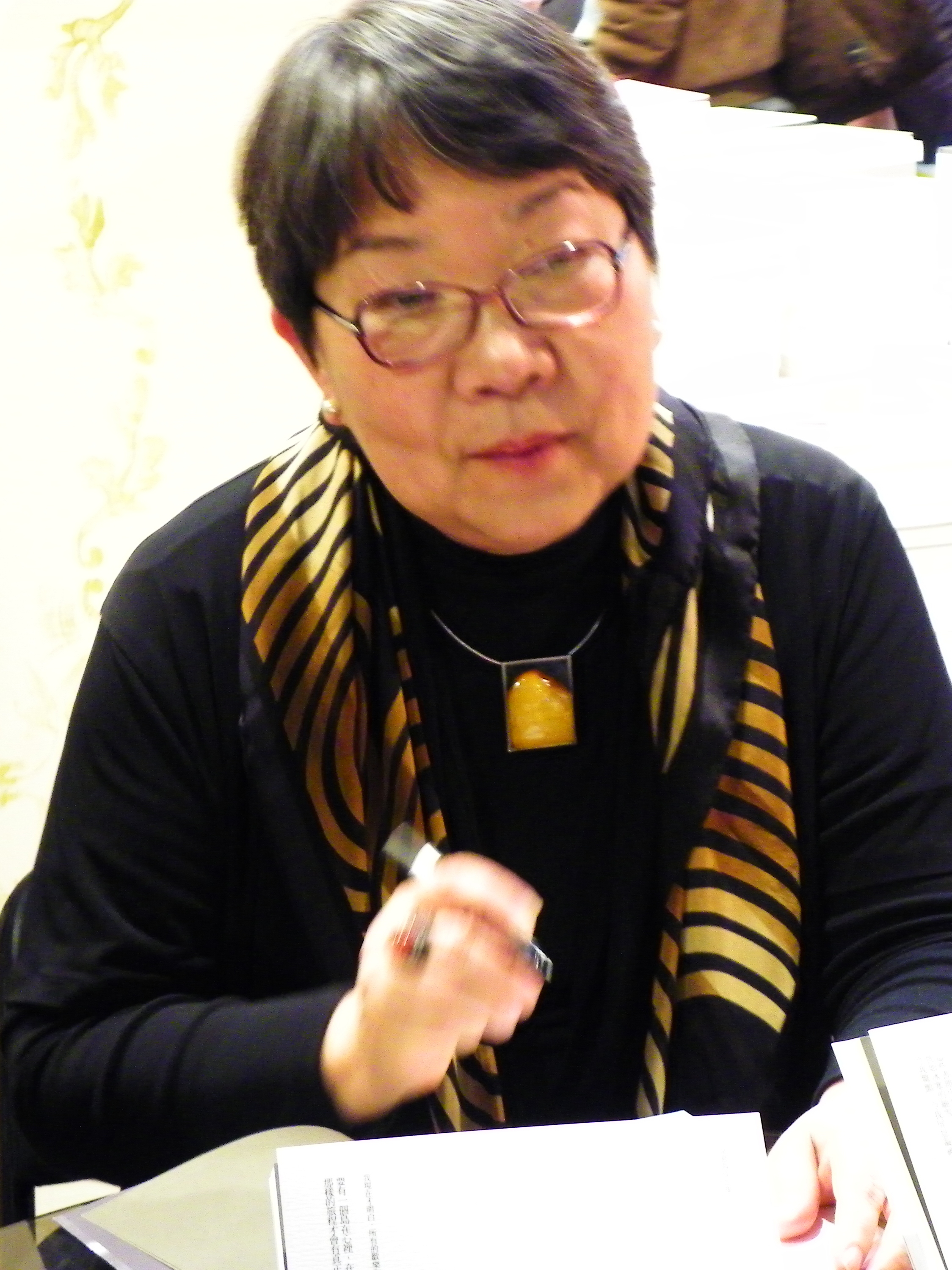
- Born: October 15, 1943 (age 83); Chongqing, China
- Education: National Taiwan Normal University, Royal College of Arts
- Occupations: Poet, painter
- Spouse: Liu Haibei (劉海北)
- Children: son: Liu Ankai (劉安凱) daughter: Liu Fangci (劉芳慈)
- Relatives: father: Xi Zhenduo mother: Yue Zhufang sister: Phyllis Gomda Hsi
- Writing career
- Language: Mandarin Chinese, Mongolian
- Period: 1981–present
- Genre: Poetry
- Notable work: Qilixiang (《七里香》)

Xi Murong or Hsi Muren (Chinese: 席慕容; pinyin: Xí Mùróng; born 1943) is a writer and painter. She is most famous for her poetry, especially the collections Seven Miles of Fragrance (七里香; Qīlǐ Xiāng) and Unregrettable Youth (Note: Also translated as Regretless Youth and Blameless Youth.) (無怨的青春; Wúyuàn de Qīngchūn).

== Personal life ==
On 15 October 1943, Xi was born in Chongqing. She moved to Hong Kong with her family in 1949, and then to Taiwan in 1953.

In 1959, Xi entered the National Taiwan Normal University, majoring in fine art. In 1963, she graduated from National Taiwan Normal University, and started teaching at Taipei Renai Middle School.

In 1964, Xi entered the Academie Royale des Beaux-Arts in Belgium, where she studied oil painting. In February 1966, she held her first art exhibition in Brussels.

In 1974, Xi held her first art exhibition in Taiwan.

In 1976, Xi participated in the Union Novel Prize where she won an award.

== Writing ==
- 1979: Drawing Portray
- 1981: Qi Li Xiang
- 1982: Traces of Growth
- 1983: Regardless Youth
- 1987: Nine Works of Time
- 1988: In the Far Away Place
- 1992: Song of River
- 1997: Prairie of Time
- 2011: Name as Poetry

== See also ==
- Taiwanese art
