= Six Dynasties poetry =

Historic style of Chinese poetry

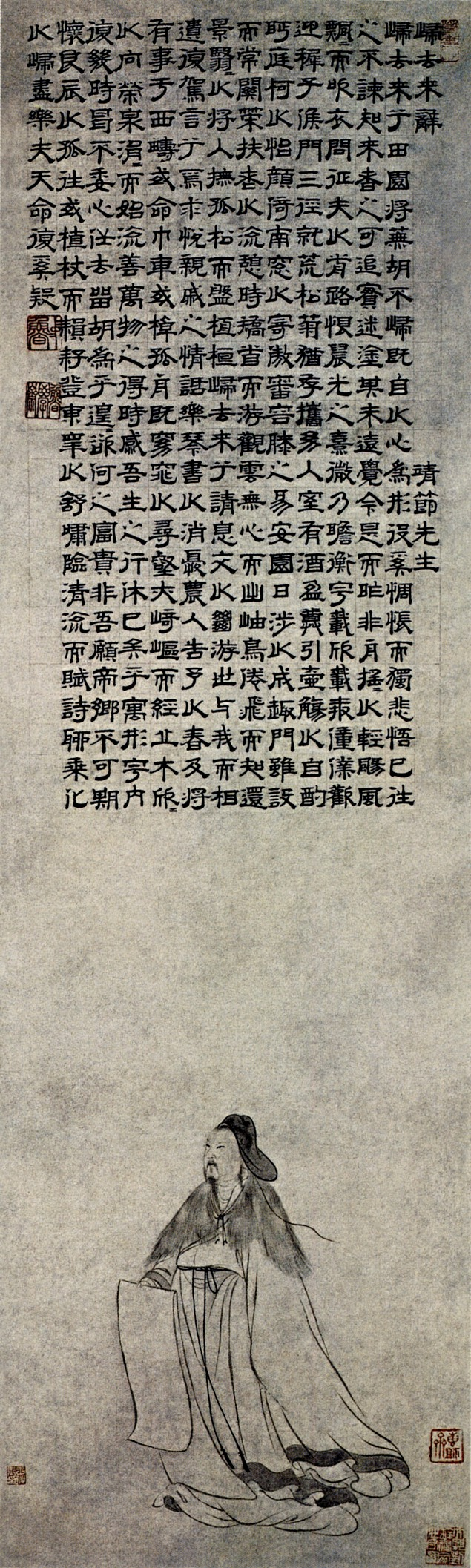
Master Jingjie (the posthumous name for Tao Yuanming). Text at top is from the Fu style poem 歸去來兮. By Wang Zhongyu, Ming dynasty (1368–1644).

Six Dynasties poetry (simplified Chinese: 六朝诗; traditional Chinese: 六朝詩) refers to the types or styles of poetry particularly associated with the Six Dynasties era of Chinese history (220–589 CE). This poetry reflects one of the poetry world's more important flowerings, as well as being a unique period in Classical Chinese poetry, which, over this time period, developed a poetry with special emphasis on romantic love, gender roles, and human relationships. The Six Dynasties era is sometimes known as the "Age of Fragmentation", because China as a whole through this period lacked unification as a state, at least for any extended period of time; and, instead, many states rose and fell, often overlapping in existence with other states. Which of the various states and dynasties constituted the "six" dynasties of the Six Dynasties period varies somewhat according to which of the traditional selection criteria are chosen. The Six Dynasties era covers several somewhat overlapping main periods including all of the following: the Three Kingdoms (220–280), Jin dynasty (266–420, in two approximate parts, Western Jin 266–316 and Eastern Jin 317–420), the Sixteen Kingdoms (also known as the "Sixteen States", 304 to 439), and the Southern and Northern Dynasties (420–589). Sometimes, chronological discrepancies occur in regard to the turbulent political events of the time, from which these traditional historical-era designations derive, together with the somewhat different chronology of poetic (versus political) developments. Thus, neither the lives of the poets nor the trends in their poetry fit gently and neatly together with these period dates. Furthermore, conversions to the Common Era dating system can create further complications. However, regardless of the chronological difficulties, major developments of poetry during the Six Dynasties include formalizing the distinction between the Jian'an era regular yuefu and the shi style poetry, further development of the fu, theoretical work on technique, and the preservation of both Six Dynasties and earlier poetry by collecting and publishing many of the pieces which survive today into various anthologies consisting all or in part of poetry.

== Context ==
The Six Dynasties poetic period formed an important link between the folk-ballad (yuefu) style prominent in the poetry of the Han dynasty and the following revival and experimentation with the older forms during the Tang dynasty. Even before the formal end of the Han dynasty the poetic developments typical of that era had begun to yield to the Jian'an style, just as the political power of Han yielded more and more to that of the rising power of various regional hegemons, including Cao Cao and the Cao family. The Cao family was both poetically involved in this process towards the end of the Han era and into the beginning of the subsequent Three Kingdoms era, one of which kingdoms was founded by the Cao family as dynasts. The Cao family's new state, which they called Wei, also was the base area of the Sima clan, which increased in power over time, until one of the Sima family became Emperor Wu of Jin. The early phase of this Jin dynasty, known as Western Jin, provided a unified period for China (266–316), but lacking long-term stability. After this period, the Jin ceded control of the north to various successor states. However, the Jin dynasty as a whole was rather productive of poetry, both original works and collections and criticism. The north–south divide continued as a major feature in the landscape of Chinese poetry through the eventual Sui dynasty re-unification, which shortly gave way to the relatively unified and long term stability of the Tang dynasty, and a whole new poetic era of Tang poetry.

=== Han poetry ===
The received legacy of poetry during the Han dynasty includes the classical poetry traditions of the Shi Jing and the proto-Chu Ci. Specific developments of Han poetry included the developments along the lines of these two traditions and the lyrics of folk ballad style as exemplified in the Music Bureau tradition (yuefu).

=== Jian'an poetry ===
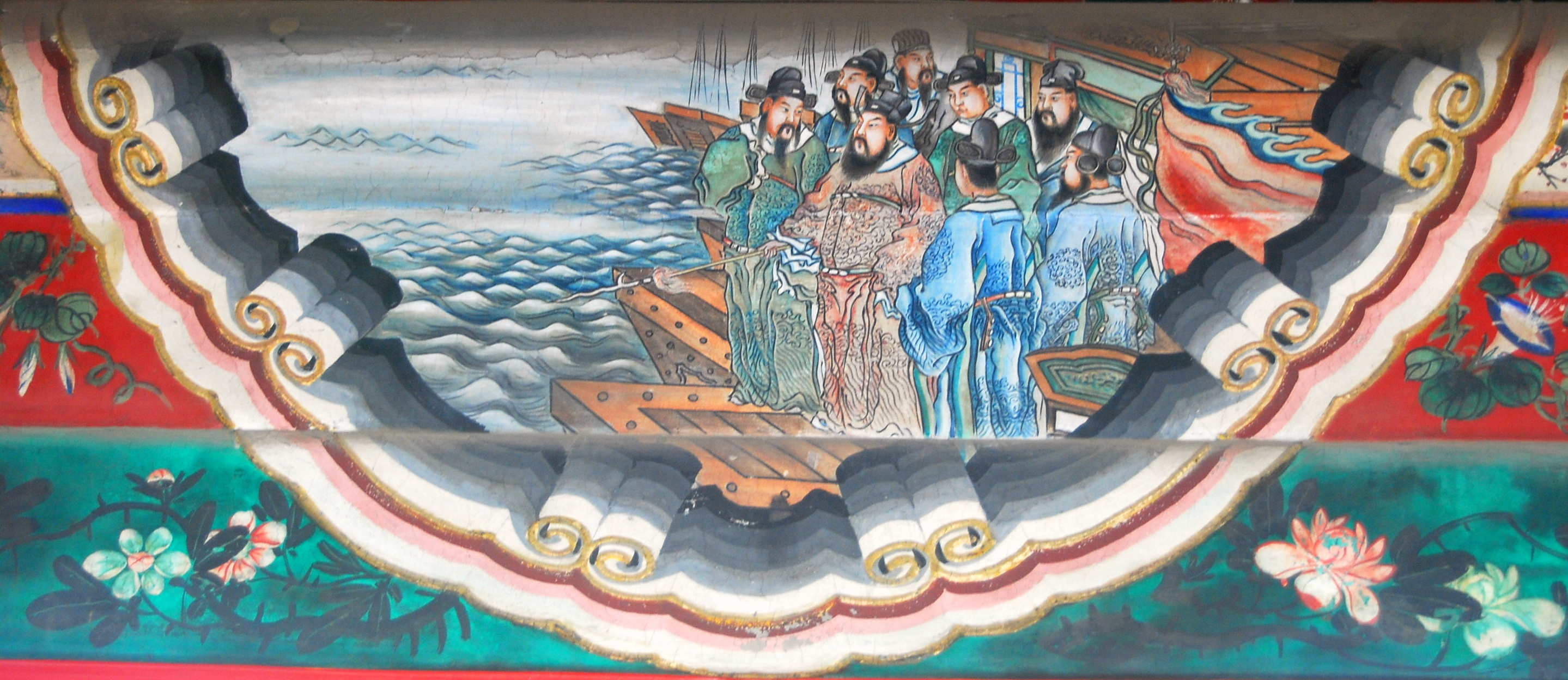
Cao Cao cites a poem before the Battle of Red Cliffs. Portrait at the Long Corridor of the Summer Palace, Beijing.

The development of Chinese poetry does not correspond precisely with the conventional dating of Chinese history by dynasty, despite certain correspondences between the political and poetic trends, with the period of actual transition between dynasties is especially problematic. This is indeed the case in discussing the important poets in the late Han and early Six Dynasties period, including the famous general Cao Cao (155–220), who may be reckoned in this period, although actually beginning his career in the Later/Eastern Han era. That is, the final years at the End of the Han dynasty and during which the Cao family was rising, or risen, to prominence were known as the Jian'an era (196–220). The Jian'an was technically a Han dynasty Chinese era name referring approximately to the years 196–220, during the nominal reign of Emperor Xian of Han, during the End of the Han dynasty. The following major period is known as the Three Kingdoms era, due to the three kingdoms which succeeded the Han dynasty, and proceeded to vie with one another for succession to the Han empire. These three successor states are Wei (also known as Cao Wei, 220–266), Shu, (also known as Shu Han, 221–263) and Wu (also known as Eastern Wu or Sun Wu, 229–280). The jian'an poetry merges with early the early Six Dynasty poetry of the early Three Kingdoms, both in terms of style and in some cases the actual poets, although the plague epidemic of 217–218 killed four of the seven Masters of Jian'an, and mortality rates were high otherwise, in some cases risk being associated with what someone wrote.

== Early Three Kingdoms poetry ==
The Cao family from 184 to 220 was involved in the chaotic infighting between warlords, across various parts of China. In 220, Cao Pi founded the Wei, or Cao Wei dynasty (220–266 CE). with its capital at Luoyang, in northern China. Its name came from 213, when Cao Cao's feudal holdings were given the name Wei; historians often add the prefix Cao (曹, from Cao Cao's family name) to distinguish it from the other states in Chinese history also known as Wei. Twenty-four of Cao Cao's poems survive. Cao Cao and his son and successor to power, Cao Pi, were both noted as patrons of literature. Altogether the Cao family, especially Cao Cao's fourth son, Cao Zhi, in association with other poets helped to form the Jian'an style. Cao Zhi is also noted for his association with the dramatically composed and life-saving poem known as "The Quatrain of Seven Steps". Cao Pi wrote an essay Seven Scholars of Jian'an which was influential in the development of the Jian'an school of poetry. One of the poets patronized by Cao Cao and considered to be one of the "Seven Scholars of Jian'an" was Xu Gan (170–217). Another poet in this group was Wang Can (177–217).

== End of Cao Wei and founding of Jin ==
The middle part of the Three Kingdoms period, from 220 and 263, was marked by a more politically and militarily stable arrangement between three rival states, Wei, Shu, and Wu. The later part of this period was marked by the collapse of the tripartite situation. First, in 263, there was the conquest of Shu by Wei. In the meantime the Cao family had been steadily losing power to the Sima family and their supporters, in a series of various intrigues and in-fighting. The Sima clan was initially subordinate to the Wei dynasty, but through various intrigues and other means the Sima family and their supporters had continued to gain power at the expense of the Cao family and their supporters. In February 266, Sima Yan (later Emperor Wu) forced emperor Cao Huan of Wei to abdicate the throne to him, ending Wei and starting the Jin dynasty (as Emperor Wu). Political it was a perilous time, especially for Wei loyalists, who viewed the rise of the Sima clan as usurpers. Poetically, it was a time conducive to and encouraging the poetry of reclusion, as various poets sought refuge from the perils of the time, often finding it in settings involving nature, poetry, wine, and occasional friends. This often also explicitly or merely by implication tended towards somewhat of a poetry of protest.

=== Ruan Ji and the Seven Sages of the Bamboo Grove ===
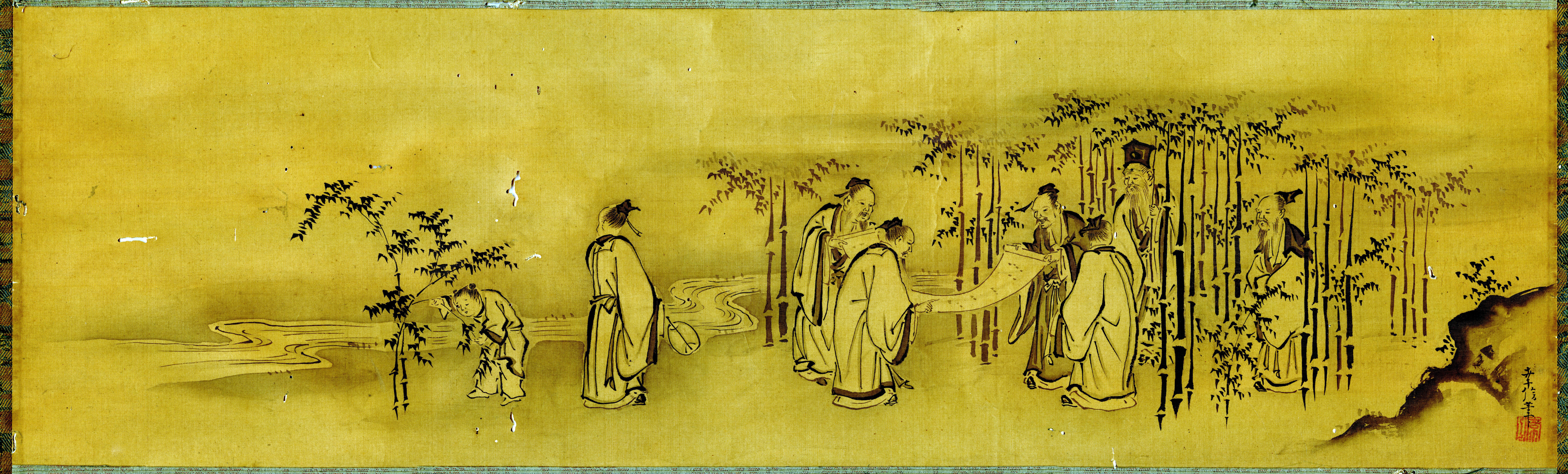
The Seven Sages of the Bamboo Grove (with boy attendant), in a Kano school Japanese painting of the Edo period

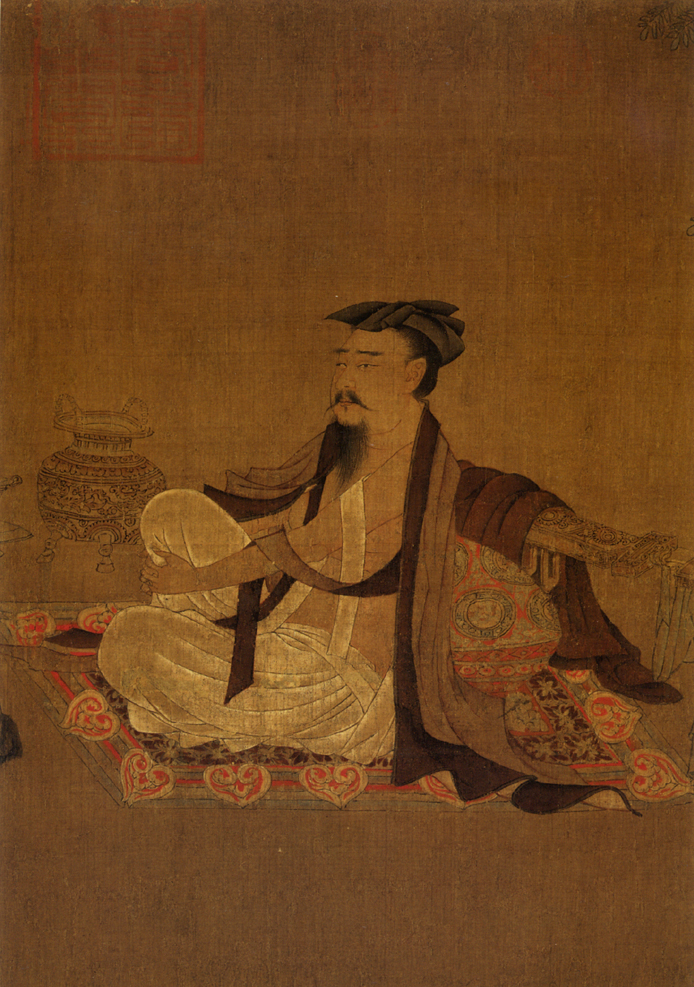
Possible representation of Ruan Ji. Attributed to Sun Wei, second half of 9th century.

As is traditionally depicted, the group wished to escape the intrigues, corruption and stifling atmosphere of court life during the tail end of the politically fraught Three Kingdoms period of Chinese history and into the early period of the newly established Jin dynasty. According to tradition, the members, Liu Ling (221–300), Ruan Ji (210–263), Ruan Xian (fl. 3rd century), Xiang Xiu, Wang Rong (234–305) and Shan Tao (205–283) gathered in a bamboo grove near the house of Xi Kang (aka Ji Kang) (223–262), in Shanyang (now in Henan province) where they enjoyed, and praised in their works, the simple, rustic life. Modern criticism suggests that these gatherings may have been to some extent virtual. Either way, this way of living was contrasted with the life of politics at court. The Seven Sages stressed the enjoyment of ale, personal freedom, spontaneity and a celebration of nature. The various seven sages had their own specialties. However, they shared philosophical discussion, musical production, and drinking. Burton Watson considers Ruan Ji (whose name he transcribes as Juan Chi) to be the "first important poet" following the Jian'an poetry style. Ruan Ji helped to define the Six Dynasties poetic development of the themes of reclusion and friendship. He helped to develop the five-character shi poetry form which had just newly developed with the Jian'an poets, but he moved it away from its initial starkly realistic descriptions of particular scenes which could be right before the poets' eyes towards more generalized, abstract, and symbolic poetic statement. Ruan Ji also developed the nature theme, focusing on "the passing of time and the cycle of the seasons", which lead towards the death of the individual. Ruan Ji was also used to deploy the imagery of birds as symbols of freedom and ability to escape their given situation. Burton Watson further notes the evident lack of the imagery of wine in Ruan's surviving poems. Not that he was unacquainted with it, even recorded as having remained continuously drunk for 2 months to avoid an undesirable marriage which was urged upon him with great political pressure such that he could not overtly refuse.

=== Other early Jin poets ===
Counted as a Jin dynasty poet and official, Zhang Hua (232–300), was actually born before the creation of the Jin dynasty, however he flourished poetically during it, and died during it (as a result of the War of the Eight Princes). The general and prolific poet Lu Ji used Neo-Taoist cosmology to take literary theory in a new direction with his "Wen fu", or "Essay on Literature" in the fu poetic form.

== Jin dynasty ==
The Jin dynasty was divided into an "eastern" and a "western" phase. Really, though, this may be less helpful of a description than saying that in terms of general geography the most apparent geographic difference between the first part and the second part of the Jin dynasty was the loss to the empire of the northern parts above the Huai River. However, historians often focus on the location of the capital on an east–west axis.

=== Historical background ===
The Jin dynasty (266–420) briefly unified the Chinese empire, in 280, but from 291 to 306 a multi-sided civil war known as the War of the Eight Princes raged through northern China, devastating that part of the country. For the first thirteen years this was a deadly violent and all-out struggle for power among at least eight princes and various dukes of Jin. Then in 304 CE the leader of the formerly independent ethnic nation of the Northern Xiongnu under its newly declared Grand Chanyu Liu Yuan (later Prince Han Zhao) declared independence, backed up with a large army which he fielded. Various other non-Chinese groups became involved, in what is known as the Wu Hu uprising, and by 316 the last Jin prince left standing, now as emperor, ruled an empire reduced to its former southern area. Thus, the history of the Jin dynasty can be divided in two parts, the first being Western Jin (266–316) and the second Eastern Jin (317–420).

=== Western Jin poetry ===
Poetry certainly occurred during Western Jin (266–316). Some of it is haunted by the social and political turmoils involved with the various changes of the times. Since the time span involved is about 50 years, many poets and trends in poetry transcend these somewhat arbitrary limits.

=== Eastern Jin poetry ===
Eastern Jin poetry includes work in the area known as the quasi-poetic literary form of fu. Sometimes fu is considered to be poetry, sometimes it is considered to be prose with poetic qualities. This rapprochement between prose and poetry is typical of late Six Dynasties literature, in general. Eventually, one of the enduring legacies of late Six Dynasties literature during the Tang dynasty at least would prove to be the reaction to the excesses which this sometimes indulged in. That is, until the late Tang, when similarly densely allusive literature again became in vogue. Anyway, in or around the period of the Eastern Jin dynasty (317–420), much poetic activity occurred, and this is sometimes referred to as "southern".

==== The Orchid Pavilion Gathering ====
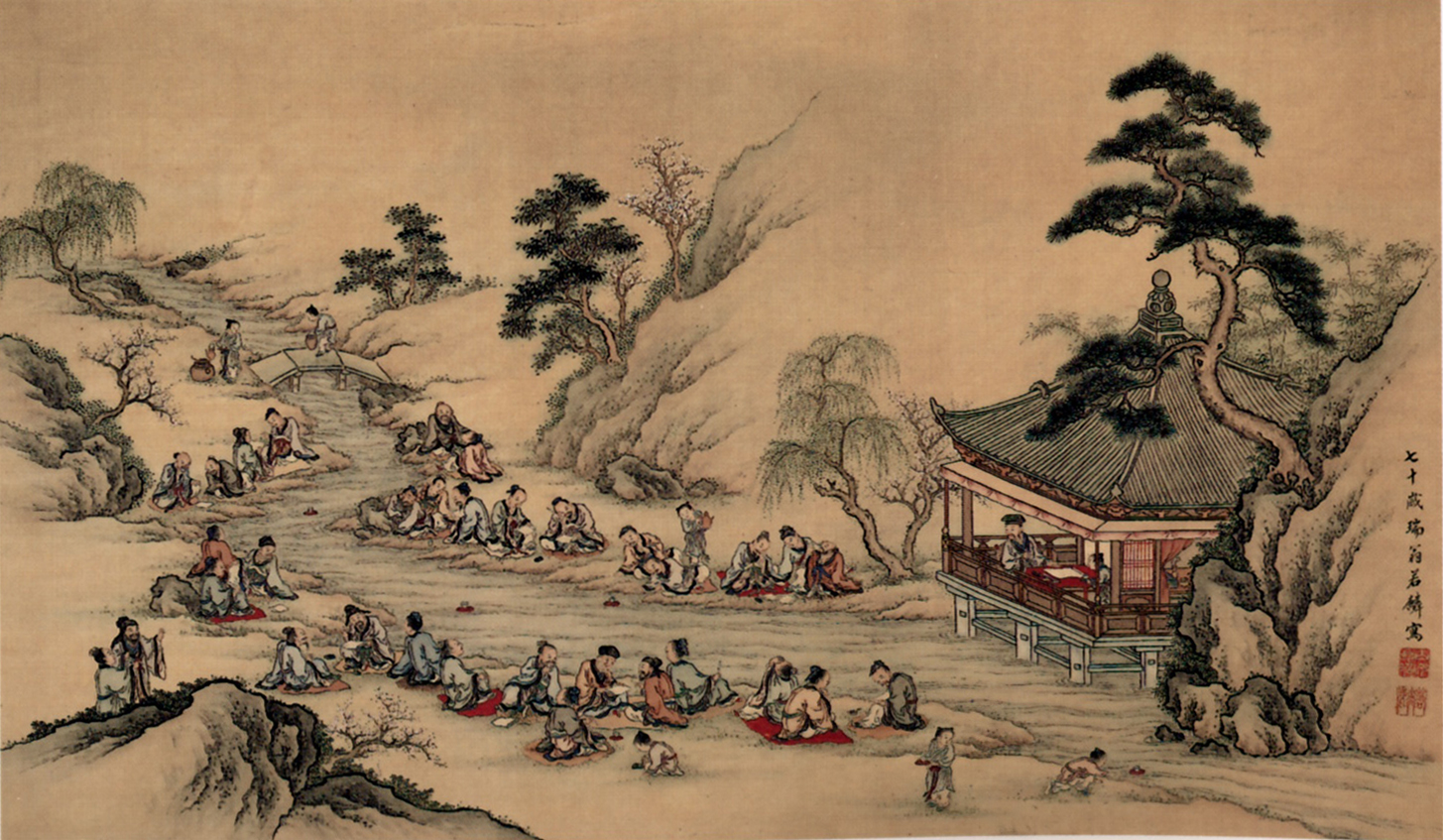
The Orchid Pavilion Gathering as depicted in an 18th-century Japanese painting

The Orchid Pavilion Gathering (353 CE) of 42 literati included Xie An and Sun Chuo at the Orchid Pavilion near Shaoxing, Zhejiang, during the Spring Purification Festival to compose poems and enjoy the wine. The gentlemen had engaged in a drinking contest: wine cups were floated down a small winding creek as the men sat along its banks; whenever a cup stopped, the man closest to the cup was required to empty it and write a poem. In the end, twenty-six of the participants composed thirty-seven poems. The "Preface (Lantingji Xu)" to the poems is particularly famous in regard to the art of calligraphy.

==== Midnight Songs poetry ====
Also significant is the Midnight Songs poetry also known as Ziye (Tzu-yeh) songs, or "Lady Midnight" style, supposedly originating with an eponymously named fourth-century professional singer of the Eastern Jin dynasty. Included in this category of erotic poetry are both the early collection of specific pieces and pieces from the later genre which is stylistically based upon them. The original pieces are arranged in four parts, according to the four seasons; and, thus, later pieces accordingly show marked seasonal aspects.

==== Tao Yuanming ====
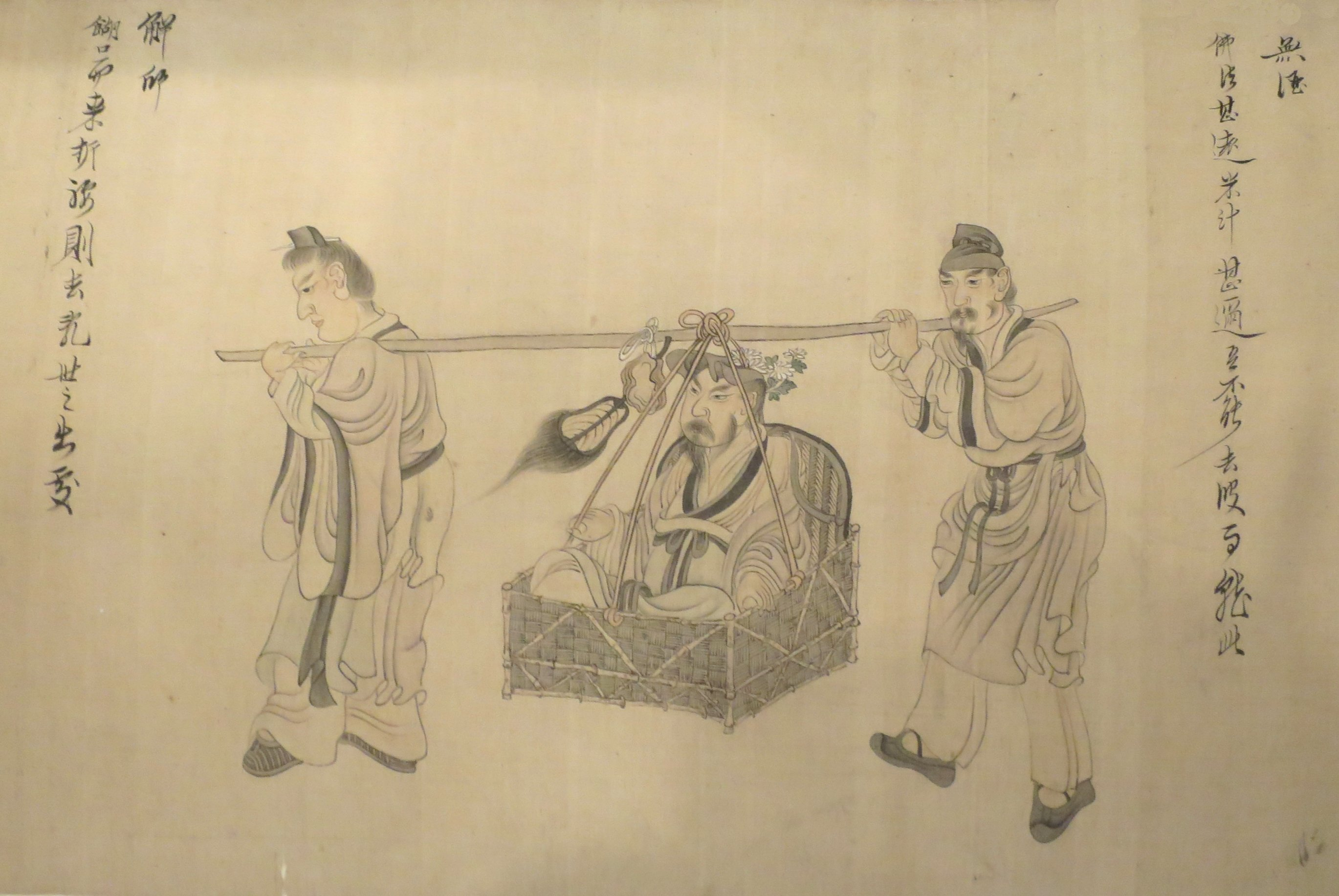
Detail from handscroll Scenes from the Life of Tao Yuanming, by Chen Hongshou, 1650, Honolulu Academy of Arts

Tao Yuanming, also known as Tao Qian, lived from 365 to 427. Tao was one of the Six Dynasties' southern poets: born in the Eastern Jin dynasty, he lived on into the ensuing Liu Song dynasty. He was associated with the formation of the Fields and Gardens poetry genre. He was also a major exemplar of the poetry of reclusion. And, he is also especially noted for portraying immediate experience in the style of his own natural voice. Tao Qian was hired as an official by the Jin court, famously for the salary of five measures of rice; but, he famously quit, resigning in favor of a life of farming and poetry. Another of Tao's favorite activities (or at least the result thereof) was brewing his own homemade wine. Of his poetry, Tao Yuanming has around 130 surviving poems.

==== Xie Lingyun ====
Xie Lingyun (385–433) was considered a progenitor and major exponent of nature or landscape poetry focusing on the "mountain and streams", as opposed to Tao Yuanming and the "field and garden" type of Chinese landscape poetry. His poetry is allusive and complex, and uses a lot of imagery of hills and nature.

==== Fu and other East Jin poetry ====
Other important Eastern Jin poets include the two heroes of Taikang Lu Ji (Shiheng) (261–303) and Pan Yue (247–300), Liu Kun (劉琨), and Guo Pu (276–324), also Yan Yanzhi (顏延之, 384–456, so more often considered as Liu Song dynasty poet). Lu Ji is represented by his Wen fu. Pan Yue also wrote in the fu form, and is remembered for his three poems to his dead wife. Guo Pu was a prolific author whose works include prose, poetry, and fu.

== Sixteen Kingdoms poetry ==
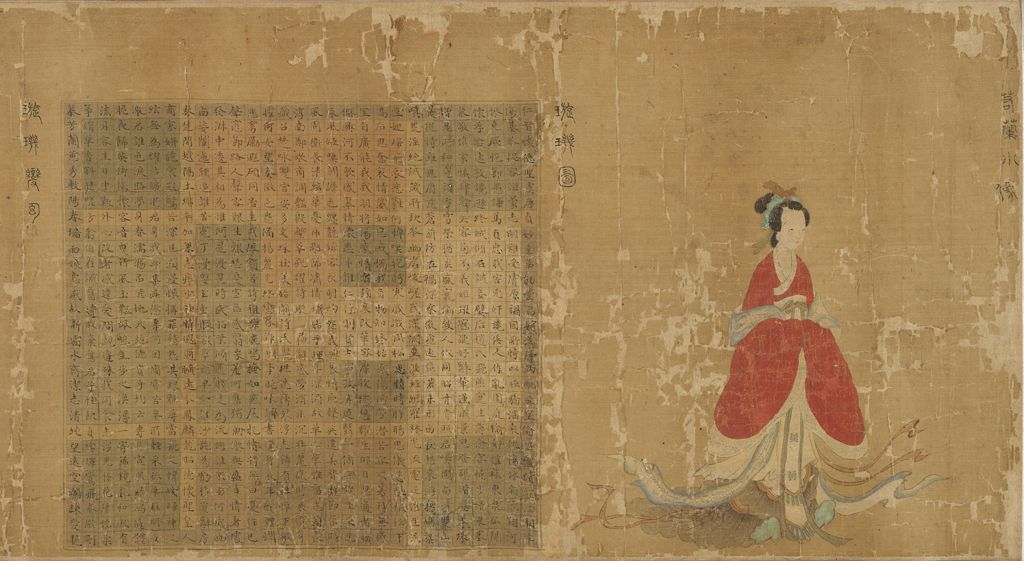
Su Hui with a palindrome

The Sixteen Kingdoms were a collection of numerous short-lived sovereign states in northern China and its neighboring areas (304–439), founded after the Jin dynasty lost the northern part of their territory and were confined to their former southern territory, thus chronologically overlapping the end of the Jin dynasty and the actual establishment of the full Southern and Northern Dynasties period (420 to 589). One noted poet of this era, somewhere in the fourth century, was Su Hui, a poet of the Former Qin state (351–394), which unified northern China, in 376. Typically, for female poets of this time and place in history, almost all of her literary works are lost. Her sole surviving piece is of the huiren shi (palindrome poem) genre.

== Northern and Southern dynasties poets ==
The Southern dynasties (náncháo) comprise the Liu Song, Southern Qi, Liang and Chen, this period follows the end of the Jin dynasty. The Northern Dynasties (běicháo) included Northern Wei (386–534), Eastern Wei (534–550), Western Wei (535–557), Northern Qi (550–577), and Northern Zhou (557–581 CE). Considered together, they are known as the Southern and Northern Dynasties (420 to 589). This division between north and south involved various considerations: many of these being of a political and military nature, together with the natural geological barriers which run east–west, especially the Yangzi River and the combination of the Huai River and the Qin Mountains (Qín Lǐng). Yu Xin is one of the few poets who can be associated with both the south and the north during this period.

=== Liu Song ===
The "Three Giants of Yuanjia" include Yan Yanzhi.

=== Yongming ===
The Yongming (Yung-ming) period was from 483 to 493. Yongming was an era name of Emperor Wu of Southern Qi. Several poets were associated with it.

Wang Jung (468–494) was one of the most important of the Yongming poets. He became quite involved in political affairs. Eventually this involvement resulted in his early death.

Fan Yun (451–503) was another of the Yongming poets.

Su Xiaoxiao (蘇小小, died c. 501), also known as Su Xiao, or "Little Su", was a famous singer and poet from Qiantang city (now Hangzhou, Zhejiang province, China) in the Southern Qi dynasty (479–502).

=== Liang dynasty and the jade terrace ===
The Liang dynasty (502–557), also known as the Southern Liang dynasty, was the third of the Southern dynasties. Founded by the Xiao family, its first emperor was Liang Wu Di. In 531, his son Xiao Gang (later Emperor Jianwen of Liang) became Crown Prince, in which position Xiao Gang both practiced poetry and became a patron of poets. Of this poetic activity, especially important is the anthology New Songs from the Jade Terrace, compiled by Xu Ling (507–83), under the patronage of Crown Prince Xiao Gang (Later known as Emperor Jianwen). The "Jade Terrace" is at least in part a reference to the luxurious palace apartments to which upper-class women were often relegated, one of the main conventional images being that of a beautiful concubine languishing away in lonely confinement, bereft of love. The New Songs from the Jade Terrace has been popularly translated into English. The collection contains over 600 pieces focused on the ideals of feminine beauty, and some of the poems are matter-of-factly homoerotic, describing the beloved young man involved in much the same terms as the female beloved is in other pieces. In other cases, a "hint of fetishism" is shown in poetic verses describing the objects associated with the men or women described in the poems; that is, their bedrooms and feast halls, the musical instruments, lamps or mirror-stands which they handle, or the fine stationary upon which they write their love notes.

== Influence ==
The Six Dynasties period ended when China was reunified by the Sui dynasty. In terms of poetic development, both the Sui dynasty (589–618) early Tang poetry were both heavily indebted to the Six Dynasty poetry. Various influences of Six Dynasties poetry include both those in terms of formalistic style and in terms of content, such as historical references. Some of the importance of the Six Dynasty era to poetry includes poetry theory and aesthetic understanding. One example is Liu Xie's The Literary Mind and the Carving of Dragons.

== See also ==
- Classical Chinese poetry
- Classical Chinese poetry genres
- Fu (poetry)
- Han poetry
- History of the Jin dynasty (266–420)
- Jian'an poetry
- Lantingji Xu in reference to the Orchid Pavilion gathering
- Love and the Turning Year
- Seven Sages of the Bamboo Grove
- Han–Xiongnu Wars
- Tang poetry
- Timeline of Chinese history

== Notes and references ==
- Chang, H. C. (1977). Chinese Literature 2: Nature Poetry. (New York: Columbia University Press). ISBN 0-231-04288-4.
- Davis, A. R. (Albert Richard), Editor and Introduction, The Penguin Book of Chinese Verse. (Baltimore: Penguin Books) (1970).
- Frankel, Hans H. (1978). The Flowering Plum and the Palace Lady. (New Haven and London: Yale University Press) ISBN 0-300-02242-5.
- Hinton, David (2008). Classical Chinese Poetry: An Anthology. New York: Farrar, Straus, and Giroux. ISBN 0-374-10536-7 / ISBN 978-0-374-10536-5.
- Yip, Wai-lim (1997). Chinese Poetry: An Anthology of Major Modes and Genres. Durham and London: Duke University Press. ISBN 0-8223-1946-2.
- Watson, Burton (1971). CHINESE LYRICISM: Shih Poetry from the Second to the Twelfth Century. New York: Columbia University Press. ISBN 0-231-03464-4.
