= Music Bureau =

Imperial Chinese government organ

The Music Bureau (Traditional Chinese: 樂府; Simplified Chinese: 乐府; Hanyu Pinyin: yuèfǔ, and sometimes known as the "Imperial Music Bureau") served in the capacity of an organ of various imperial government bureaucracies of China: discontinuously and in various incarnations, the Music Bureau was charged directly, by the emperor (or other monarchical ruler), or indirectly, through the royal (or imperial) government to perform various tasks related to music, poetry, entertainment, or religious worship. These tasks included both musical and lyrical research and development, and also directing performances.

The existence of a Music Bureau was typical of various Chinese dynasties, though the Music Bureau's prominence and influence may have peaked during the reign of Han dynasty emperor Wu, who was especially interested in such activities and engaged himself accordingly. The mission of the Music Bureau was concerned with poetry, music, and their live performances, because these concepts were not really considered to be distinct: lyrics are a part of music, and traditional Chinese poems, particularly shi, were considered to be suitable for chanting or singing, and poetic verses in accompaniment with instrumental music were often presented together as integral parts of performances. In the case of the Music Bureau, performances were oriented towards religious rites or entertainment in service to the emperor.

The songs/poems collected or developed by the Han music bureau received the appellation of "yuefu"; but, eventually, the term "Music Bureau", or yuefu (also yueh-fu) also came to be applied to a category of Classical Chinese poetry which was based upon the standard forms and themes documented or promoted by the Music Bureau staff during the Han dynasty. Known as yuefu (meaning "in the style of the Music Bureau poetry"), this type of poetry made major contributions to Han poetry, as well as the Jian'an poetry of the late Han and early Six Dynasties. There was also an important later Tang poetry literary revival of the yuefu poetic forms.

== Name ==
The name of the Music Bureau and also the poetry collected, produced, or disseminated by it is sometime transliterated into English as yue fu. This "fu" is a different word than the name of the rhapsodic type of prose/verse fu (traditional Chinese: 賦; simplified Chinese: 赋; pinyin: fù), which has tended to be likewise transliterated into English as "fu".

== Pre-history and mythology ==
The earliest mentions of a government office of music or at least an official in charge of music or a department of music is found in Chinese mythology. Huang Di is claimed to have appointed a Governor of Music, named Ling Lun. As Governor of Music, Linglun seems to have been charged with designing and overseeing the production of actual instruments, as well as the development of the musical scale. Emperor Shun is said to have founded a Ministry of Music, to which he appointed a Minister Kui to head. The main purpose of this institution was to teach the heirs apparent proper conduct and harmony (in both senses of the word), and as such, it served as a mythological model for both the future Music Bureau and the imperial education system.

=== Music Masters ===
Despite the scarcity of evidence regarding the early or initial formation or formations of an actual imperial or royal Music Bureau, better evidence exists regarding the position of imperial or royal Music Master. However, whether the Music Master was the head of an organized governmental bureau or department or were merely solo functionaries seems somewhat of an open question. In any case, certain of these early Music Masters are historically and culturally important; for example, Music Masters Shi Yan and Shi Kuang both appear in the Chu Ci poem "Leaving the World" (Li shi), from the Nine Laments section by Liu Xiang.

==== Shi Yan ====
Shi Yan was Music Master to Di Xin (r. 1075–1046 BCE), the last Shang dynasty ruler. A blind musician, Shi Yan was king Di Xin's Music Master during the end of his reign. According to legend (or Zhou propaganda from the succeeding dynasty) his reign was characterized by drinking, women, sex, and lack of morals, activities which Di Xin was said to prefer at this point in his career to spending his time in properly governing his country; he ignored almost all affairs of state, and was often too besotted even to keep track of what day it was. According to Sima Qian, Di Xin with his concubines (especially Daji) developed the habit of hosting festive orgies where many people engaged in sex at the same time and created songs with crude erotic lyrics and allegedly poor rhythm. However, after the Zhou dynasty army defeated the Shang military power at the Battle of Muye, in 1046 BCE, Di Xin gathered up his treasures in his expensively-built palace and set a huge fire, burning himself up together with his luxurious possessions. After this, Shi Yan is supposed to have firmly grasped a-hold of his musical instrument and jumped to his suicidal death in the waters of the Pu River, where his ghostly music was heard playing centuries later.

==== Shi Kuang ====
Shi Kuang (zh:師曠 (师旷)) was a 6th-century BC musician, and Music Master for the Duke of Jin. A blind musician, Shi Kuang attempted to prevent the Music Master of a visiting ruler from playing the ghostly music which the latter had heard while camping by the River Pu (the music of Shi Yan, above). After hearing just a few bars, Shi Kuang realized the dangerous quality of this tune, and tried to prevent the perilous continuation of play. The Duke of Jin, however, commanded that its play continue: thence a mighty wind arose sweeping the tiles from the roof of his palace, a three-year drought in his duchy commenced, and the duke himself contracted a debilitating disease from which he did not recover.

== History ==
The documentary evidence is contradictory and unclear for when and by whom the Music Bureau was founded; however it is known to have existed during the Qin dynasty (221–205 BCE), if not earlier. Apparently, during the political and social turmoil during and after the fall of Qin (during the Chu–Han Contention), the Music Bureau seems to have been discontinued, but it was later revived. The earliest known evidence for the existence of a specific governmental bureau of music appears to be an official seal of State Music Bureau of the state of Qi dating from the Warring States period (480–221 BCE). Certainly, the history of the Classic of Poetry seems to confirm the existence of some sort of official functionaries responsible for the collection of songs and poetry in the royal courts of the Zhou dynasty and of Lu and other states of the Spring and Autumn period.

The Music Bureau greatly flourished under Emperor Wu of Han (Wudi, reigned 141–87 BCE). Its first director under Wudi was Li Yannian. The emperor Wu has been widely cited to have created the Music Bureau in 120 BCE, however it seems most likely that there was a long-standing office of music and that as part of his governmental reorganization Wu enlarged its size, changed its scope and function, as well as possibly renaming it –– thus seeming and being credited with establishing a new institution, the stated tasks of which were apparently to collect popular songs from various areas within the Han Empire, as well as external sources and to adapt and orchestrate these, as well as to develop new material. The historian Ban Gu states in his Book of Han that the Music Bureau was subordinate to the shaofu, or Lesser Treasury, which was responsible for the emperor's personal needs. Sima Qian in his Records of the Grand Historian states that the early Han emperors retained the Music Bureau, continuing it the same as it had been since ancient times. In any case, Wudi is widely held to have used the Music Bureau as an important part of his religious innovations and to have specifically commissioned Sima Xiangru to write poetry.

The Music Bureau was officially disbanded by Emperor Ai of Han in the year 7 BCE, partly as an economy measure. By that time it had nearly 830 musicians and dancers. The Music Bureau was not revived for a long period. During the Tang dynasty, the Music Bureau was responsible for composing the music for the Grand Carnival in Chang'an. Emperor Huizong of the Song dynasty also temporarily established the Great Splendour Music Bureau (Dasheng Yuefu) that had 785 musicians and dancers in 1102.

== Influence on poetry ==
Because of the development and transmission of a particular style of poetry by the Music Bureau, this style of poetry has become known as the "Music Bureau" style, or Yuefu. Several important collections survive of the Han dynasty Yuefu, including some in Xiao Tong and others' work Wen Xuan and some in Xu Ling's New Songs from the Jade Terrace; however the most important collection is Guo Maoqian's Anthology of Yuefu Poetry, which includes the poem "Hua Mulan".

== See also ==
- Classical Chinese poetry
- Classical Chinese poetry forms
- Emperor Ai of Han
- Emperor Wu of Han
- Guo Maoqian
- Han dynasty
- Han poetry
- Hua Mulan
- Jian'an poetry
- Kapellmeister
- Music of China
- Pear Garden
- Qin dynasty
- State of Qi
