= Bao Zhao =

Chinese poet and official

- 鮑照
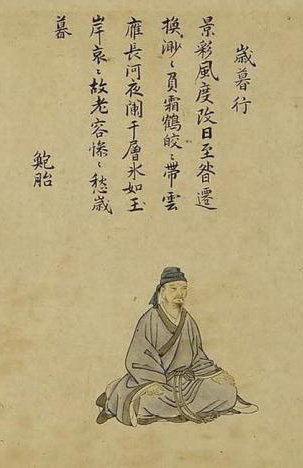
- Bao Zhao, painted by Kanō Tsunenobu in the 18th century.
- Born: c. 414; Lanling County, Shandong, China
- Died: September 466 (aged c. 52); China
- Occupations: Poet, politician

Chinese name
- Traditional Chinese: 鮑照
- Simplified Chinese: 鲍照
Transcriptions
Standard Mandarin
- Hanyu Pinyin: Bào Zhào
- Wade–Giles: Pao^{4} Chao^{4}
- IPA: [pâʊ ʈʂâʊ]
Yue: Cantonese
- Yale Romanization: Baauh Jiu
- Jyutping: Baau^{6} Ziu^{3}
- IPA: [paw˨ tsiw˧]
Southern Min
- Tâi-lô: Pāu Tsiàu
Middle Chinese
- Middle Chinese: pæ̀w tʃjèw

Courtesy name
- Traditional Chinese: 明遠
- Simplified Chinese: 明远
Transcriptions
Standard Mandarin
- Hanyu Pinyin: Míngyuǎn

Bao Zhao (Chinese: 鮑照; c. 414 – September 466) was a Chinese poet, writer, and official during the Liu Song dynasty (420–479) known for his shi poetry, fu rhapsodies, and parallel prose. Bao's best known surviving work is his "Fu on the Ruined City" (Wú chéng fù 蕪城賦), a long fu rhapsody on the ruined city of Guangling (now Yangzhou).

== Life and career ==
Bao Zhao, courtesy name Mingyuan (明遠), was born around AD 414. He was probably born in the town of Jingkou (modern Zhenjiang, Jiangsu Province), though some sources say he was born in Shangdang (modern Zhangzi County, Shanxi Province) or Xuzhou (modern Tancheng County, Shandong Province). Bao's younger sister Bao Linghui was also a poet, and seven of her poems have survived.

Little is known of Bao's early life. He was born into a scholar-class family whose fortunes had declined. He was probably a farmer as a young man before beginning his career as an official on the staffs of local princes of the Liu Song dynasty. Beginning in about 438, Bao served as an attendant gentleman (shìláng 侍郎) to Liu Yiqing (劉義慶), the prince of Linchuan. In the early 440s, Liu served as governor of Jiangzhou (roughly corresponding to modern Jiangxi and Fujian Provinces), and Bao writes that he traveled around the area of modern Jiujiang, writing poems on the mountain scenery around Mount Lu.

After Liu Yiqing's death in 444, Bao briefly returned home to Jingkou. Then, in 445, he joined the staff of Liu Jun (劉駿; 436–463), another Liu Song prince, who was serving as governor of Yangzhou (modern Nanjing). Bao spent several years in Liu Jun's service and accompanied him on his campaign to retaliate against the Xianbei-ruled Northern Wei dynasty, which had invaded southern China in January 451. Bao left Liu Jun's staff about 452, spending the next 12 years serving in various local governmental positions, as well as a stint in the imperial capital Jiankang (modern Nanjing) as a professor at the Imperial Academy.

In 464, Bao joined the staff of the seven-year-old prince Liu Zixu (劉子頊; 457–466), who nominally served as governor of Jingzhou. In early 466, another Liu Song prince rebelled and declared himself Emperor, and Liu Zixu soon joined the rebellion, probably encouraged by his adult advisors. The rebellion was put down in the following months, and in September 466 imperial forces retook Jingzhou. Because the rebellion was organized by the prince's aides and administrators, and not the young prince himself, Bao was unable to escape punishment for his involvement. The nine-year-old Liu Zixu was forced to commit suicide, and all of his staff members, including the approximately 52-year-old Bao, were executed.

== Works ==
About 200 of Bao Zhao's poems survive. His works were initially gathered into a collection several decades after his death, but this collection seems to have been lost during the Tang dynasty (618–907). Eleven of Bao's poems are preserved in the early medieval anthology Selections of Refined Literature (Wen xuan 文選).

Bao's most famous piece is his "Fu on the Ruined City" (Wú chéng fù 蕪城賦), a moving fu rhapsody on the former capital, Guangling, which had been razed to the ground in the Northern Wei invasion of January 451. It gives an account of the ruined capital, contrasted with its former grandiosity, in a nostalgic and longing fashion that is common in Liu Song-era poetry. Another of Bao's surviving fu rhapsodies is "Fu on the Dancing Cranes" (Wǔ hè fù 舞鶴賦), which describes a troupe of trained performing cranes.

Bao also composed shi poetry, and is best known for his use of the yuefu lyrical song genre. Bao is the first Chinese poet known to have composed shi poetry in the seven-syllable line format where, instead of the traditional AAAA rhyme scheme in which each line in a stanza rhymed, a more mixed rhyme scheme of ABCB was used.
