= Han poetry =

Style of poetry

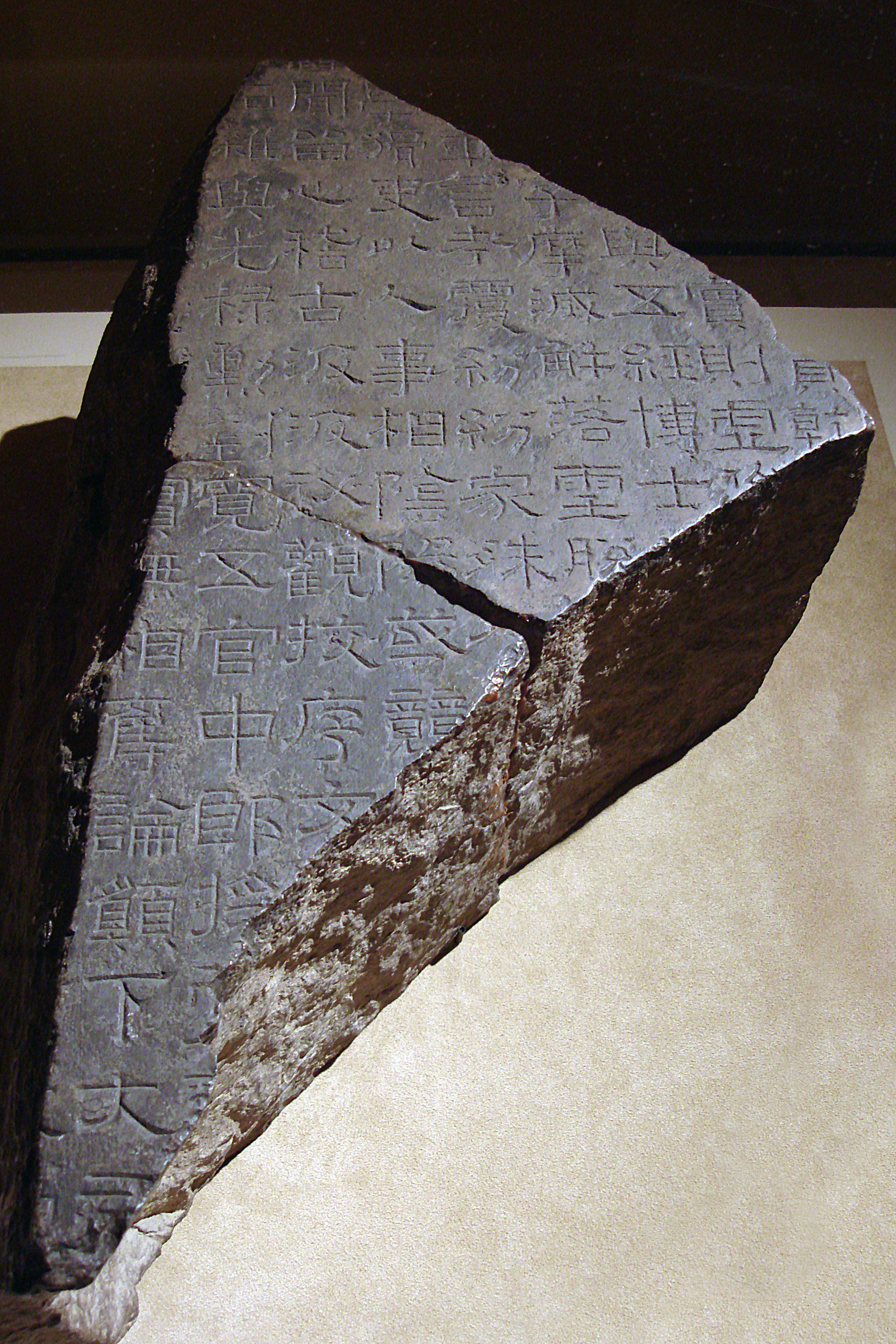
CMOC Treasures of Ancient China exhibit – a rare surviving fragment of the Xiping Stone Classics, a series which included the Shijing poetry anthology, which was part of the legacy of poetry contributing to the Han dynastic era.

Han poetry is associated with the Han dynasty era of China, 206 BC – 220 AD, including the Wang Mang interregnum (9–23 AD). Han poetry is considered a significant period in Classical Chinese poetry due to several important developments. One key aspect was the development of the quasipoetic fu, a distinctive literary form. The activities of the Music Bureau, which collected popular ballads, led to the creation of what would later be known as the yuefu, a rhapsodic poetic style.

Towards the end of the Han dynasty, a new style of shi poetry emerged. As the yuefu evolved into fixed-line forms resembling shi poetry, distinguishing between the two styles became increasingly difficult. Consequently, the classification of certain poems as yuefu or shi is often somewhat arbitrary.

Major works from the Han era include the compilation of the Chuci anthology, which contains some of the oldest and most important poetic verses to be preserved from ancient China, after the Shijing anthology.

== General background ==
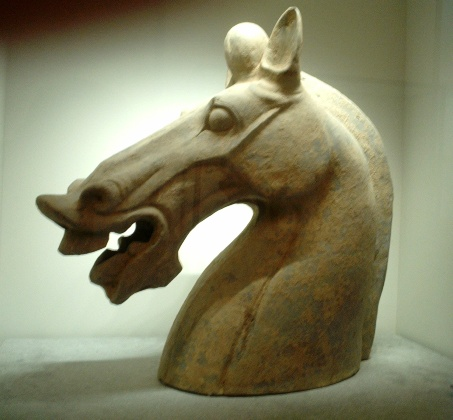
A Han dynasty terracotta horse head (1st–2nd century AD).

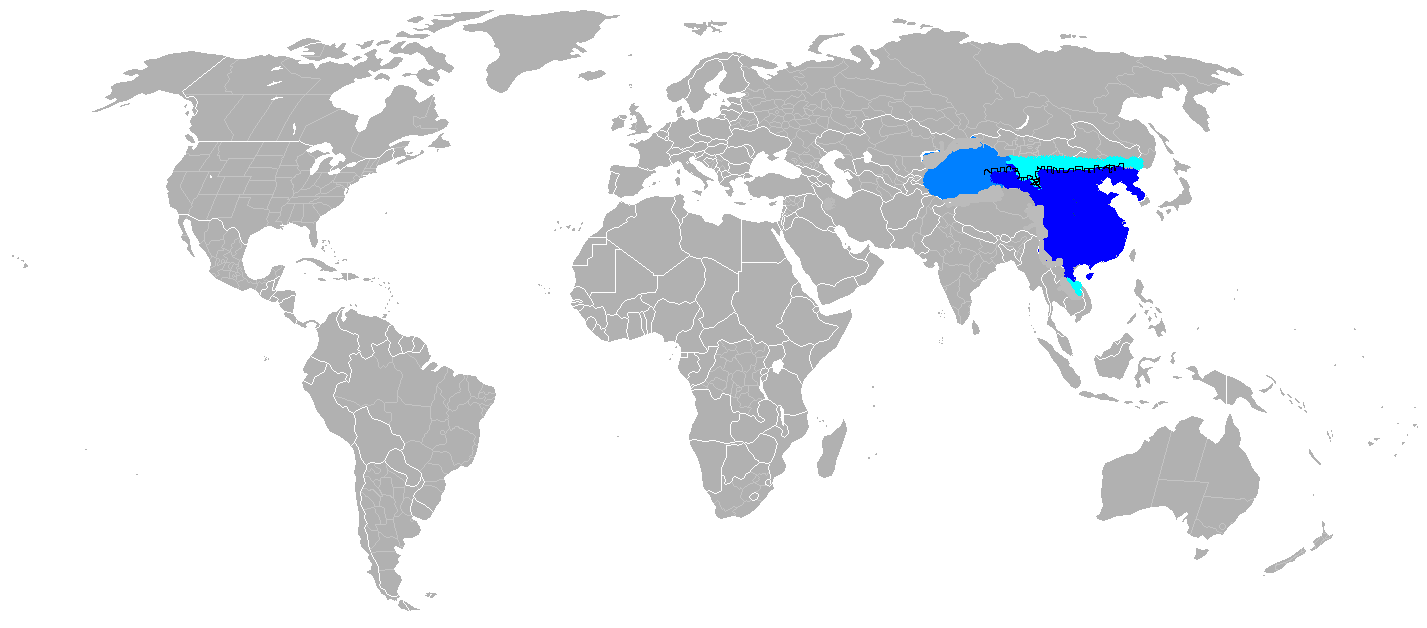
Map of the Western Han Dynasty in 2 AD. 1. Darkest blue are the principalities and commanderies of the Han Empire. 2. Light blue is the Tarim Basin protectorate. 3. Sky blue areas are under fluctuating control. 4. Crenelations are the Great Wall of China during the Han dynasty.

The ruling family of the Han dynasty was the Liu family, founded by Liu Bang. His career began as a minor official during the chaotic final years of the Qin dynasty. During this period of instability, Liu Bang became an outlaw and rebel, eventually rising to the position of King of Han during the division of the Qin empire. After establishing the Han dynasty, he was posthumously honored as Emperor Gaozu, also known as the Han High Founder or Han Great Ancestor.

Despite Liu Bang's commoner background and general lack of literacy, he held a great regard for literature and learning. His patronage of literature and the arts, as well as his connections with the unique culture of Chu would set a precedent for the rest of the dynasty which he founded. He granted Liu family princes a great deal of autonomy in their local areas, and the development of subsidiary royal courts and patronage of literature and the arts followed.

Brushing characters with ink is archeologically attested to during the Han period, including on silk, hemp paper, and bamboo slips. The bamboo (or wood) slips were tied together carefully with delicate string cords. However, when these cords deteriorated over time, the slips often became disordered, scrambling the text. While more durable methods such as stamping or marking on clay or engraving on stone were also used, they required fairly elaborate craftsmanship to produce. As a result, much of the poetry from the Han dynasty has not survived in its original form. Instead, most extant works have been preserved through anthologies compiled during the Six Dynasties period.

== Poetic background ==
Han dynasty poets inherited a rich poetic legacy, notably influenced by the Shijing (Classic of Poetry) and the Chu Ci (Songs of Chu) traditions. There is little or no direct poetic influence from the preceding Qin dynasty, which engaged in a purge of heterodoxy, destroying its imperial library.

The Shijing, characterized by its "classic" four-character line structure, played a crucial role in shaping Han poetry. This verse style emphasized the direct expression of immediate experience, intended to offer a window into the poet’s inner soul. Han state policies promoted Confucian philosophy, which elevated the Shijing as one of the central canonical texts, giving it lasting prominence in Chinese literary and cultural tradition. The Chu Ci introduced innovations such as varied line lengths. Han poets expanded upon this body of work, contributing new material that was later compiled into an edited anthology. Han poets also drew inspiration from orally transmitted folk songs and ballads.

The expansion of the Han empire into new areas introduced new and exotic ideas and objects, which sometimes became subjects in the fu prose-poetry literary form.

== Han dynasty poets ==
Some well-known poets from Han times are known; however, many of the poets are anonymous, including the poets behind the Music Bureau collections including the Nineteen Old Songs, as is typical of verses from the folk ballad tradition. Important individual Han era authors of poetry include Zhang Heng and Liu Xiang. Many of the Han poets who wrote in their own personal voice under their own name or pen-name wrote in the fu style, in the sao (Chuci) style, or both. In other cases, poems have been attributed to specific Han dynasty persons, or written in perspective of their persona, but the real author remains unknown. For example, the cases of the poems attributed to Su Wu and Consort Ban are not determined. Other Han poets include Sima Xiangru, Ban Gu, and Mi Heng.

=== Sima Xiangru ===
Sima Xiangru (179–127 BC, also known as Szu-ma Hsiang-ju) was one of the most important poets of the Han dynastic era, writing in both the Chuci and the fu styles.

=== Su Wu ===
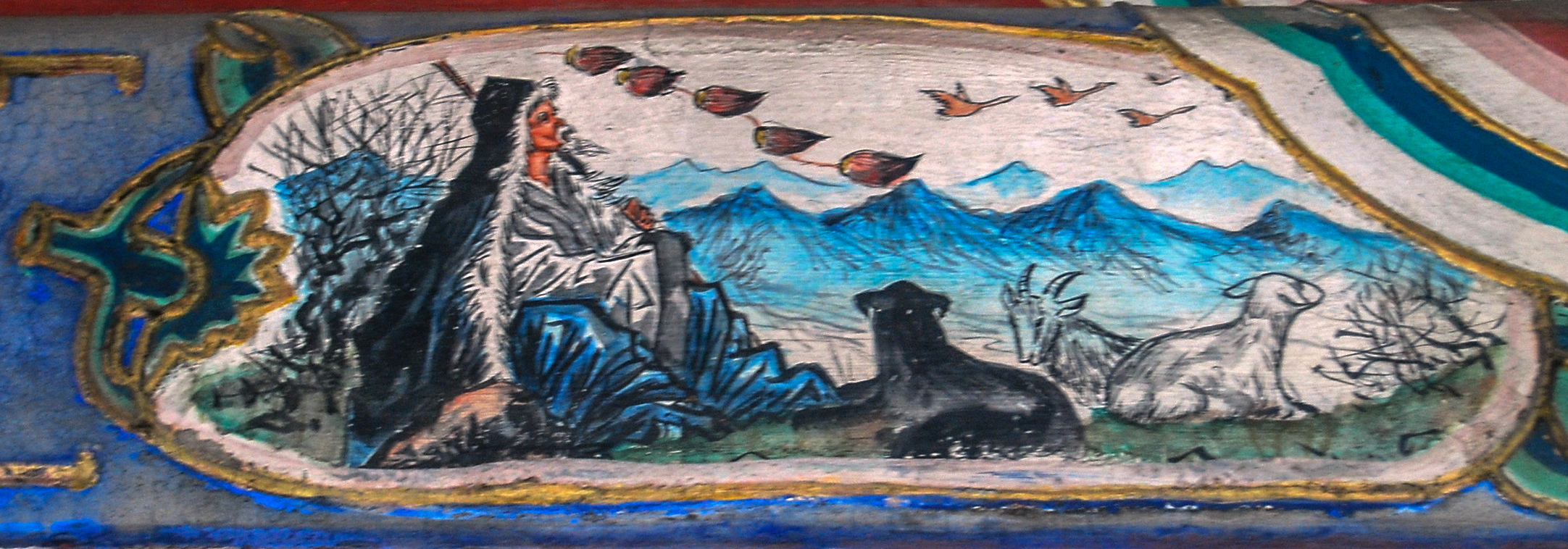
Su Wu in foreign captivity, where he was forced to herd sheep or goats. From the Long Corridor.

Su Wu (140 – 60 BC) was held captive for 19 years, returning to China in 81 BC: 4 poems collected in the Wen Xuan are only questionably attributed to him. However, at the time, it was not uncustomary to confuse the persona of a poem with the person of the author. There is a story about Su Wu which became a common allusion in Chinese poetry. According to this story, during the beginning of his captivity in the Xiongnu empire Su Wu was treated harshly, to the point it is said of having to eat the lining of his coat for food and to drink snow which he melted for water. Later Su was elevated in status, even it is said given a wife who bore him children. Upon the Han emperor sending an ambassadorial mission toward the territory in which he was being held, the Xiongnu ruler (the chanyu) wished to conceal the presence of Su Wu, presumably in order avoid diplomatic complications; but, Su Wu hearing of this tricked the chanyu by claiming that he had sent a message to the emperor by tying it to the leg of a goose, and accordingly, that since his presence was already known to the Chinese delegation that any attempts at concealing his presence would be viewed as unseemly. This is at least part of the origin of the use of the image of a flying goose as a messenger, carrying tied to its foot (perhaps symbolically) a letter between two people separated so far seasonally north and south that a migrating goose could be conceived as a possible mode of communication.

=== Ban Jieyu (Lady Pan) ===
Ban Jieyu also known as Lady Pan (Pan Chieh-Yü) was a concubine to Emperor Cheng of Han (reigned 33–7 BC) and the great-aunt of the poet, historian, and author Ban Gu. A well-known poem in the Wen Xuan is attributed to her. Although most unlikely to actually be by her (especially since it is not in her grand-nephew Ban's biography of her), it is certainly written as if it could have been written by her or someone in her position. It is an important early example of the secluded palace lady genre of poetry.

=== Ban Gu ===
Ban Gu was a 1st-century Chinese historian and poet best known for his part in compiling the historical compendium the Book of Han. Ban Gu also wrote a number of fu, which are anthologized in the Wen Xuan.

== Chuci ==
One of the most important Han era contributions to poetry is the compilation of the Chuci anthology of poetry, which preserves many poems attributed to Qu Yuan and Song Yu from the Warring States period (ended 221 BC), though about half of the poems seem to have been in fact composed during the Han Dynasty. The meaning of Chuci is something like "The Material of Chu", referring to the ancient Land of Chu. The traditional version of the Chu Ci contains 17 major sections, anthologized with its current contents by Wang Yi, a 2nd-century AD librarian who served under Emperor Shun of Han, who appended his own verses derivative of the Chuci or "sao" style at the end of the collection, under the title of Nine Longings. The poems and pieces of the Chu Ci anthology vary in their formal poetic styles, including varying line metrics, varying use of exclamatory particles, the use or not of titles for individual pieces within a section, and the varying presence of the luan (or, envoi). Other Han period poets besides Wang Yi the librarian who are known or thought to be contributors of poems collected in the Chuci include the poet Wang Bao and the scholar Liu Xiang. Liu An, the Prince of Huainan, and his literary circle were involved with the Chuci material, but the attribution of authorship of any particular poems is uncertain.

== Fu ==
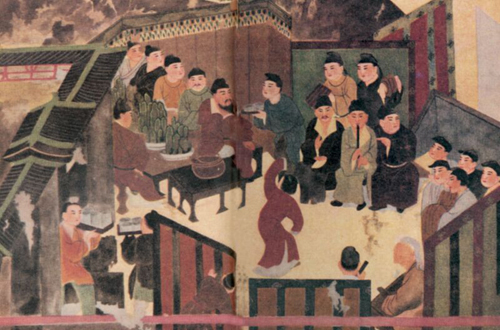
Liangyuan Gathering: Song dynasty painting of a Han dynasty literary gathering in the Liang Garden of Liu Wu, Prince of Liang. Liang was one of the principalities of the Han empire, and an area (like its Prince Liu Wu) associated with great literary attainment.

One of the major forms of literature during the Han dynasty was the fu (sometimes translated as "rhapsody"), a kind of eclectic grab bag of prose and verse, not easy to classify in English as being either poetry or prose. In Chinese, the fu is classified as wen rather than shi, however these terms do not correspond to English categories of prose and verse (one of the differences in the traditional Chinese categorization being that shi was sung or chanted, whereas the fu was not, at least according to the Hanshu), the credibility of this being enhanced by the fact that one of the compilers of the Hanshu (also known as Book of Han or History of the Former Han Dynasty) was Ban Gu, who was himself a practitioner of the fu style. The Han fu derived from the rhetorical expositions of the Intrigues of the Warring States and the Chuci, which was traditionally considered to be the work of Qu Yuan, who was a wanderer through the countryside and villages of the Kingdom of Chu, after his exile from court. In this context the "Li Sao" is particularly relevant. The Han fu of the second and first centuries BCE were intimately associated with the courts of the emperor and his princes. In other words, they were refined literary products, ornate, polished, and with an elite vocabulary; and, often the subject matter includes topics such as life in the palaces of the Han capital cities. The development of the fu form of literature during the Han dynasty shows a movement toward later more personal poetry and the poems of reclusion, typical for example, of Tao Yuanming, the Six Dynasties poet. The famous Han dynasty astronomer, mathematician, inventor, geographer, cartographer, artist, poet, statesman, and literary scholar Zhang Heng (78–139 CE) wrote a fu about his own, personal experience (real or imagined) of getting out of the city and its politics and getting back to the country and nature. The fu form continued to be popular in the centuries following the demise of the Han imperial power.

== Oral tradition folk ballads ==
An important aspect of Han poetry involves the influence of the folk ballad tradition, which can be seen in the poetry collections Nineteen Old Poems and the yuefu of the Music Bureau.

=== Nineteen Old Poems of Han ===
One of the stylistically most important developments of Han poetry can be found in the Nineteen Old Poems collection. Although extant versions exist only in later collections, particularly the Wen Xuan literary compendium, the 19 poems themselves appear to be from the Han period. They are influential both toward the gushi ("old style") poetic form, but also for their "tone of brooding melancholy....Anonymous voices speaking to us from a shadowy past, they sound a note of sadness that is to dominate the poetry of the centuries that follow." Many versions of these 19 poems thus continued to be reinvented in post-Han times, including a major revival in Tang poetry times. As Nineteen Old Poems literally means "19 gushi, poetry written in inspiration by this style were referred to as being in the gushi style, or simply labeled gushi (also transcribed as ku-shi, in English).

=== Music Bureau (Yuefu) ===
Another important aspect of Han poetry involved the institution known as the Music Bureau, or, in Chinese, Yuefu (or, Yüeh-fu). This is contrast with the "literary yuefu", which are written in the general style of Music Bureau's collection of yuefu, or derived from particular pieces thereof. The Music Bureau was a Chinese governmental institution existing to historical and archeological evidence at various times during the history of China, including an incarnation during the Qin dynasty. The Han dynasty largely adopted the Qin institutions for their own organizational model, and in particular Han Wudi is associated with a revival or an elevation in the status of the Music Bureau, which he relied upon for the elaborately spectacular ceremonial performances conducted under his regime. The traditional functions of the Music Bureau included collecting music and poetry lyrics from around the empire, and conducting and choreographing their performance for the emperor and his court. Poetry verses published by the Music Bureau are known as "Music Bureau" pieces, later works modeled on the style of the Music Bureau pieces are known as "Music Bureau style" pieces (yuefu); and, some of these "literary yuefu" and "new yuefu" poems were written by some of the best of the subsequent poets. The Han era Music Bureau (yuefu) pieces were collected and transmitted to future times in such (mostly Six Dynasties era) anthologies as the Wen Xuan and the New Songs from the Jade Terrace.

== Jian'an poetry and the future of Yuefu ==
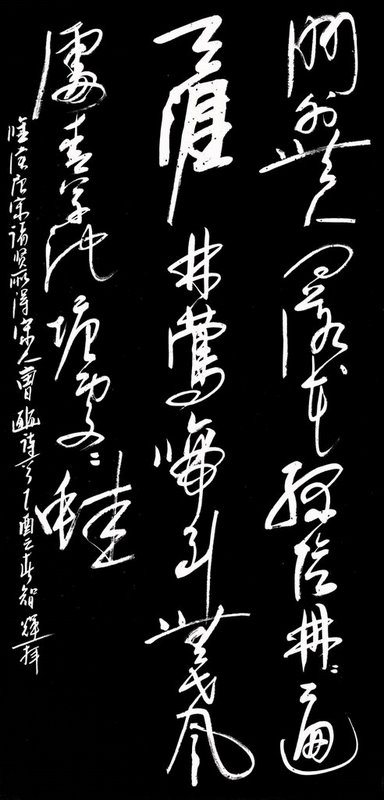
Picture of later calligraphy of a poem attributed to Cao Bin, younger brother of Cao Zhen.

The final regnal era of Han was called Jian'an. At this period the political structure of Han was breaking down, while new developments in poetry were arising. This Jian'an yuefu poetry style continued on into the Three Kingdoms and Six Dynasties era, as did the lives of some of the authors of poetry such as Cao Cao, who was born during the Han dynasty but survived it. The Han Music Bureau style which developed out of the models of the Music Bureau poetry was a particularly important feature of Jian'an poetry and the subsequent Six Dynasties poetry: the evolutionary trajectory of this poetry was towards the regular, fixed-length line verse which reached such acclaim in its Tang realization. Poetry preserved from the Han dynastic era not only exists as a monument to the achievement and skill of the poets of that time, but also serves as a link in a poetic legacy that was explicitly valued during the Tang dynastic era (during which the poems developed in the tradition of this style were known to critics as ("new yuefu"), and continued to be valued in subsequent Classical Chinese poetry, and on to the poetry of today; which is in turn, another link in a long chain of development in the field of poetry, to which the poets known and anonymous made their unique contributions.

== See also ==
- Ban Gu
- Chu Ci
- Classical Chinese poetry
- Classic of Poetry
- Eighteen Songs of a Nomad Flute
- Emperor Wu of Han
- Fu (poetry)
- Guo Maoqian
- Gushi (poetry)
- Jian'an poetry
- Kanshi (poetry)
- Music Bureau
- Return to the Field
- Sima Xiangru
- Society and culture of the Han Dynasty
- Tang poetry
- Zhang Heng
