= Bao Linghui =

Chinese poet

Bao Linghui (Chinese: 鲍令晖; pinyin: Bào Lìnghuī; Wade–Giles: Pao^{4} Ling^{4}-hui^{1}; fl. ca. 464) was a Chinese poet of the Southern Dynasties. A native of Donghai, Jiangsu Province, she was the younger sister of poet Bao Zhao, and, like her brother, wrote in the style of refined imitation of Han dynasty folksongs and ballads. Dates of her birth and death were unknown, but according to Bao Zhao's Qingjiaqi (请假启), she might have died during the reign of Emperor Xiaowu of Liu Song. Her poems can be found in New Songs from the Jade Terrace. Seven of her poems are extant, all of the "boudoir lament" genre, in which the poet laments the absence of her lover.

== See also ==
- Six dynasties poetry
