= Lingzong =

Fourth-century Chinese Buddhist nun

Lingzong (令宗, fl. 372 – 396) was a Chinese Buddhist nun known for her work in poor relief.

== Life ==
Lingzong, whose secular surname was Man, was from Jinxiang in Gaoping. According to Shi Baochang’s biography of her in his sixth-century Biographies of Nuns, her early life included two attacks from bandits, which she escaped through prayer and by her ploy of plucking out her eyebrows to pretend to be suffering from disease. It is also said that she was enabled to cross the Yellow River at Mengjin by the miraculous apparition of a white deer (a recurring motif in Buddhism).

Lingzong became a Buddhist nun of the Western Nunnery in Sizhou known for her faith and learning. Emperor Xiaowu of Jin sent her a letter conveying his respects, which was one of several of his pro-Buddhist acts.

Lingzong dedicated herself to helping the victims of an epidemic and the poor who had been displaced by the aftermath of the fall of the Western Jin dynasty. She gained the resources to help them by carrying out long journeys as a beggar.

Lingzong died suddenly, according to Baochang, while discussing a prophetic dream with her followers. Her actions in spending herself for the poor have been compared to Mother Teresa.
