= Shang Ye =

Ancient Chinese poem

- by Anonymous
- Original title: 上邪
- Written: Generally attributed to the Han to Six Dynasties period
- First published in: Anonymous
- Country: China
- Language: Classical Chinese
- Series: Yuefu of Han
- Subject(s): Love, oath, fidelity
- Genre(s): Yuefu poetry, classical Chinese poetry
- Meter: Irregular; mixed four-, five-, and six-character lines
- Lines: 9
- 上邪 at Chinese Wikisource

Shang Ye (By Heaven!, Chinese: 上邪) is an ancient Chinese folk song about love, whose author is no longer known. The Collection of Music Bureau Poems (樂府詩集) version has a total of 9 lines and 33 characters.

== Content ==
The poem list six "impossible things", only if all of them were to happen would the speaker be willing to break with the lover.

中文原文

上邪
我欲與君相知
長命無絕衰
山無陵
江水為竭
冬雷震震
夏雨雪
天地合
乃敢與君絕

English translation

By Heaven!
I wish to be as one with you,
For as long as life shall never fade or fail.
When mountains have no peaks,
When rivers run dry,
When thunder rumbles in the depth of winter, (Note: In northern China, there is rarely thunder or rain in winter.)
When snow falls in the heat of summer,
When heaven and earth merge into one—
Only then would I dare to part from you.

== In popular culture ==
It appears as a line in the television drama adapted from My Fair Princess, shortened to “When the mountains lose their ridges and heaven and earth unite, only then would I dare part from you.”
