= History of the Jin dynasty =

History of the Jin dynasty may refer to:

- History of the Jin dynasty (266–420)
  - Book of Jin, an official historical text covering the Jin dynasty (266–420)
- History of the Jin dynasty (1115–1234)
  - History of Jin, an official historical text covering the Jin dynasty

== See also ==
- Jin dynasty (disambiguation)
