= The Peacock Flies Southeast =

Chinese poem

The Peacock Flies Southeast (traditional Chinese: 孔雀東南飛; simplified Chinese: 孔雀东南飞), also translated as Southeast the Peacock Flies, or Southeast Fly the Peacocks, and originally titled An Old Poem Written for Jiao Zhongqing's Wife (古詩為焦仲卿妻作), is a long narrative gushi (古詩) poem, and it is well known by literary critics throughout the history of Chinese literature. The poem is traditionally dated to near the end of the Eastern Han dynasty, approximately between 196 and 219 AD. It has been hailed by critics for its unique narrative and composition, and also as one of the longest and best works of yuefu (樂府).

The poem portrays a tragic love story between Liu Lanzhi (劉蘭芝) and her husband, Jiao Zhongqing (焦仲卿). Jiao's mother, the lady of the house, believes Liu is not meeting her standards as a daughter-in-law. In a confrontation with her son, the mother expresses her disdain towards Liu, asking Jiao to reconsider his marriage and suggests he instead marries a more favorable woman. Humbly resisting his mother's authority, Jiao defends his wife, declaring that if she were to send Liu away, he will never remarry. Ultimately, the husband are separated by elder family members, and forced to remarry. Not willing to forsake Jiao, Liu committed suicide the night before her second wedding. Upon hearing of her death, Jiao also killed himself. In the end, the two families bury the two lovers together.

This poem was later collected in the 11th-century collection Yuefu Shi Ji (樂府詩集) by Guo Maoqian.

Cover of a modern edition

Cover of a 1930 play adaptation of the poem

Title page of a 1935 English-language translated version of the play adaptation, The Peacock Flies South-East
