= Yu Xin =

Chinese poet, politician and writer

Cover of collected work by Yu Xin (here referred to by his courtesy name Yu Zishan) as it appears in Sibu Congkan (四部叢刊; "(The) Four Branches of Literature Collection")

Yu Xin (Chinese: 庾信; pinyin: Yǔ Xìn; Wade–Giles: Yü Hsin) (513-581) was a Chinese poet, politician, and writer of the Liang and Northern Zhou dynasties of medieval China. Yu Xin was one of the founders of the Xu-Yu literary style together with Xu Ling, and the author of a famous fu. His courtesy name was Zǐshān (子山), and he was known as Yu Shin in Japan.

== Life ==
Yu Xin was born and raised in Jiangling, which was once the capital of Chu. His family was wealthy and aristocratic, and Yu became an important official of the Liang dynasty. As such, he served as the lover and patron of aspiring statesman Wang Shao.

In 554, Yu Xin was sent as an ambassador to the Western Wei in Chang'an, a mission that did not meet with success. On the way to his mission, he visited Wang Shao, now an official censor, who rejected further advances. After the fall of the Liang dynasty in 557, three of his children that remained in the Liang capital were executed. Yu was held in Chang'an for the rest of his life.

== Works ==
Along with the poet and official Xu Ling and the fathers of both men, Yu is known for the Xu-Yu Style (徐庾体), which was known as "fancy and alluring". Perhaps his most famous poem is The Lament for the South (哀江南賦), which James Hightower has described as the highest development of the fu form of poetry. A translation of this poem can be found in:

- Graham, William T. Jr. (1980), 'The Lament for the South': Yu Hsin's 'Ai Chiang-Nan Fu', Cambridge: Cambridge University Press.

== See also ==
- Classical Chinese poetry
- Six Dynasties poetry
- Xiaoxiang poetry
