= Hunping =

Imperial China funerary urn

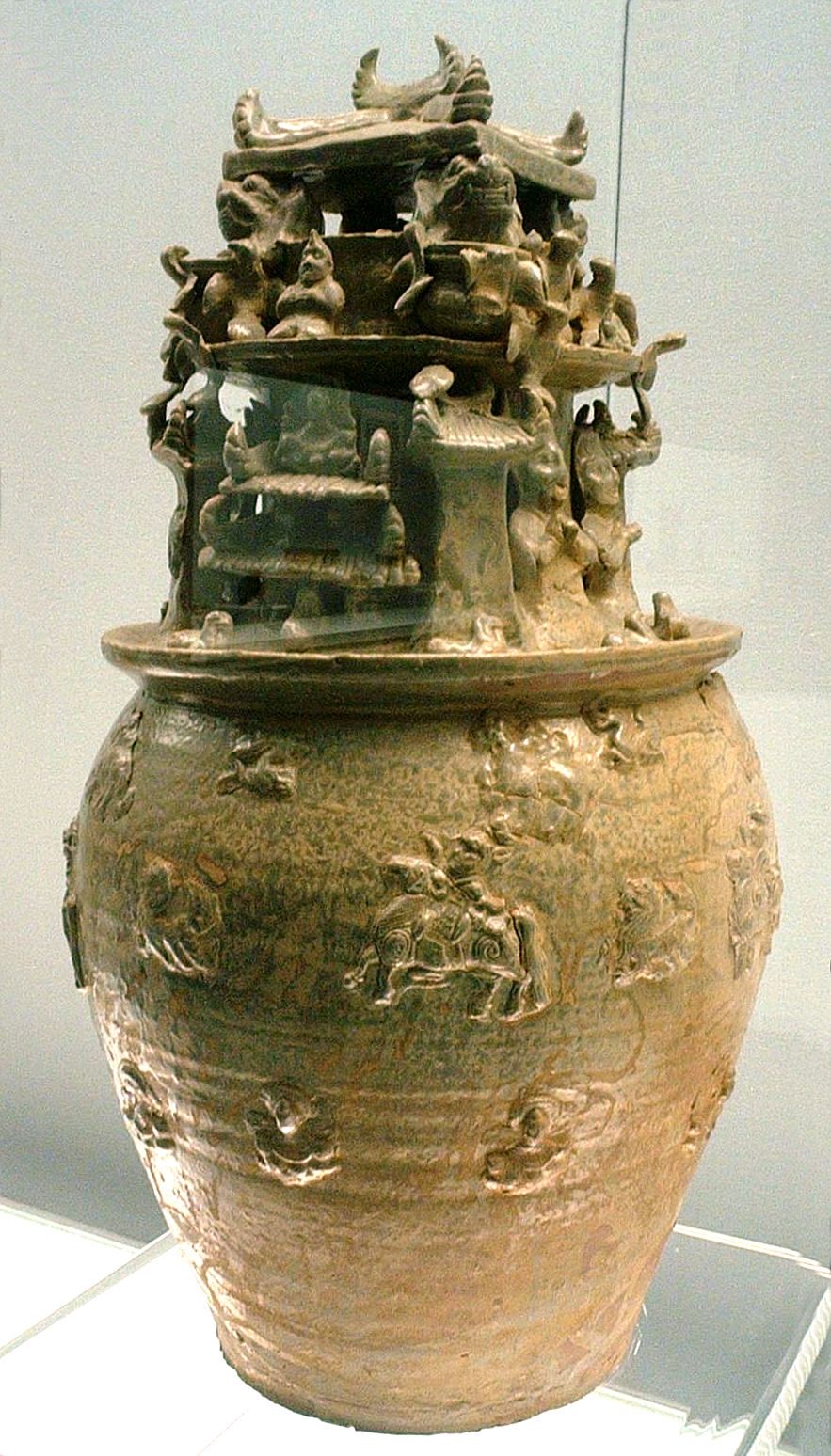
A hunping jar of the Western Jìn, with Buddhist figures

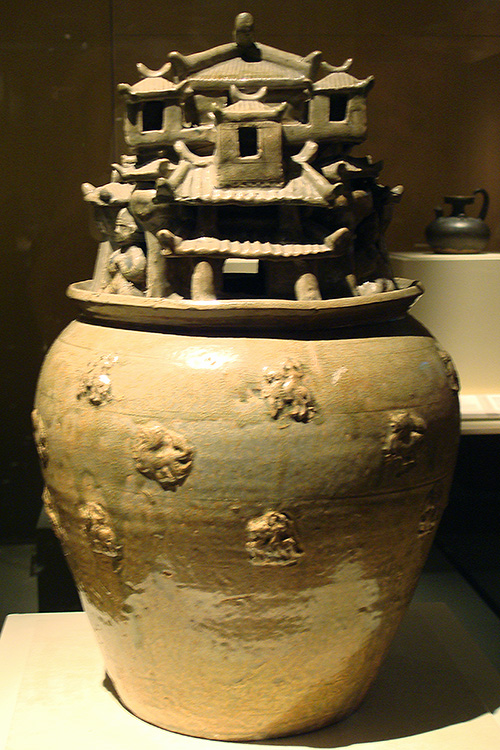
A celadon hunping jar with sculpted designs of architecture, from the Jin dynasty

The hunping (Chinese: 魂瓶; pinyin: Húnpíng), translated as soul jar or soul vase, is a type of ceramic funerary urn often found in the tombs of the Han dynasty and especially the Six Dynasties periods of early imperial China. It was characteristic of the Jiangnan region in modern southern Jiangsu and Zhejiang provinces.

The purpose of a hunping is somewhat enigmatic, but archaeologists suggest that they may have been used as containers for fruit accompanying the deceased into the afterlife. According to the Metropolitan Museum of Art, the ancients may have hoped that the soul of the deceased would eventually reside in the vessel.

Since the last decades of the Han dynasty, the top of hunping vessels started to be decorated with miniature sculptures of men, animals, birds, etc. Gradually, sculptural compositions became more elaborate, including images of entire buildings.

It is due to an early-Jin dynasty hunping, dating to 272, that an early example of a tortoise-born stele is known to us.

== See also ==
- Haniwa
