= New Songs from the Jade Terrace =

Anthology of early medieval Chinese poetry

- Traditional Chinese: 玉臺新詠
- Simplified Chinese: 玉台新咏
Transcriptions
Standard Mandarin
- Hanyu Pinyin: Yùtái xīnyǒng
- Wade–Giles: Yü^{4}-t'ai^{2} hsin^{1}-yung^{3}
- IPA: [ŷ.tʰǎɪ ɕín.jʊ̀ŋ]
Yue: Cantonese
- Yale Romanization: Yuhk-tòih sān-wihng
- Jyutping: Juk^{6}-toi^{4} san^{1}-wing^{6}
- IPA: [jʊk̚˨.tʰɔj˩ sɐn˥.wɪŋ˨]
Southern Min
- Tâi-lô: Gio̍k-tâi sin-íng
Middle Chinese
- Middle Chinese: Ngjowk-doj sin-hjüǽng

New Songs from the Jade Terrace (Chinese: 玉臺新詠; pinyin: Yùtái xīnyǒng) is an anthology of early medieval Chinese poetry in the romantic or semi-erotic "palace style" (gongti 宮體) that dates to the late Southern dynasties period (420–589). Most editions of New Songs contain 670 poems by many different authors, mainly comprising pentasyllabic poetry but also some yuefu lyrical verse and other types of poems. New Songs was probably compiled around the early to mid-530s by Xu Ling, an official and scholar who served at the court of Xiao Gang, a crown prince of the Liang dynasty (502–587) who later ascended the throne as Emperor Jianwen of Liang.

The term "Jade Terrace" is a reference to the luxurious palace apartments in to which upper-class women were often relegated, and a number of scholars have concluded that the New Songs was probably compiled to provide reading material for palace ladies. The American sinologist Burton Watson notes that this expression may also refer to "a mirror stand of jade such as women use in their toilet; and since the Chinese are fond of elegant euphemisms for parts of the body, it may even have some more esoteric connotation." New Songs from a Jade Terrace is an important collection of Chinese poetry, in part because of the individual poems which it contains, but also because the overall theme of the collection involves the discussion of sex and gender roles and ideals of love and beauty.

== History ==
A number of details regarding the creation of New Songs from the Jade Terrace are unclear and subject to debate. Its first surviving mention appears in the bibliographic section of the Book of Sui, the official dynastic history of the Sui dynasty (589–618), and lists "Xu Xiaomu" (the courtesy name of Chinese writer Xu Ling) as its compiler. However, in Xu Ling's official biography in the earlier Book of Chen, the dynastic history of the Chen dynasty (557–589), the New Songs is not mentioned. Strangely, the New Songs does not contain any poems by Xu Ling's father Xu Chi (徐摛; 471–551), a notable scholar and poet who was traditionally considered the founder of the "palace style" poetry (gōngtǐ shī 宮體詩) the New Songs collects.

The textual history of New Songs is particularly complicated. Although it was compiled in the early- to mid-530s, no manuscript or printing of the New Songs from before the Ming dynasty (1368–1644) has survived to modern times. The traditional edition of the New Songs was printed in 1633 and is based on a late Song dynasty (960–1287) edition printed in 1215 that itself was a "patchwork" of two other printed editions and one manuscript copy. It contains 654 poems and was long considered the best surviving edition, but recent scholarship has indicated that it contains a number of significant flaws and errors, causing renewed attention toward other surviving editions.

== Contents ==
New Songs from a Jade Terrace contains poems by about 115 poets, of whom 14 were female. It is divided into ten sections, and 769 headings of verses "devoted almost entirely to poems about love," that is, the primary emphasis is upon male-female love in the context of the women's apartments, and contains material ranging from anonymous Han Dynasty ballads through poems contemporary to the time of composition. The various poems are mostly by men, though some by women. The collection contains over 600 pieces focused on the ideals of feminine beauty, and some of the poems are matter-of-factly homoerotic, describing the beloved young man involved in much the same terms as the female beloved is in other pieces. In other cases, a "hint of fetishism" is shown in poetic verses describing the objects associated with the men or women described in the poems; that is, their bedrooms and feast halls, the musical instruments, lamps or mirror-stands which they handle, or the fine stationery upon which they write their love notes.

== See also ==
- Bao Linghui
- Classical Chinese poetry
- Emperor Jianwen of Liang
- J. H. Prynne
- Six Dynasties
- Six Dynasties poetry
- Liang Dynasty
