= Xu Ling =

Chinese poet (6th century CE)

Xu Ling (Chinese: 徐陵; pinyin: Xú Líng) (507–583) was the compiler and editor of the famous poetry anthology New Songs from the Jade Terrace during the poetically prolific Southern Dynasties era, 420–589. His political career began in the end of the regin of Emperor Wu of Liang and ended in the reign of Last Emperor of Chen spanning across nine sovereigns. His courtesy name (zi) was Xiao Mu (Chinese: 孝穆; pinyin: Xiào Mù).

== Biography ==
Xu Ling's ancestral home was Tan County, Donghai Commandery (now Tancheng County, Shandong Province), and his father was the commander of Yulin Commandery under Southern Qi Dynasty. Early in life he achieved fame for poetry and literature. He has achieved lasting renown for his anthology New Songs from the Jade Terrace, which he compiled under the patronage of Xiao Gang (503-551), first a prince, and who was then later known as Liang Jianwendi, after becoming Emperor of the Liang Dynasty, 549-551.

== See also ==
- Six Dynasties
- New Songs from the Jade Terrace
- Yu Xin
