= Guo Maoqian =

Courtesy name
- Traditional Chinese: 德粲
- Simplified Chinese: 德粲
Transcriptions
Standard Mandarin
- Hanyu Pinyin: Décàn
- Wade–Giles: Tê^{2}-ts'an^{4}

Guo Maoqian (Chinese: 郭茂倩; pinyin: Guō Màoqiàn; Wade–Giles: Kuo Mao-ch'ien; 1041-1099) was a Song dynasty poetry anthologist. He compiled an important collection of lyrical pieces in his work Anthology of Yuefu Poetry (樂府詩集), which contains almost all of the surviving Music Bureau style, or Yuefu from the Han dynasty through the Tang dynasty and to the Five Dynasties, and which includes such famous poems as "Hua Mulan".

== Biography ==
No extensive biographical material about Guo Maoqian is known; as such, he is mostly known through his works. However, it is known that both his father and grandfather were famous government officials in what is now Shandong in the first half of the Eleventh Century, and that he was the first-born of five sons and five daughters. He, too, got a career in government, becoming a low-level official in Hunan, in about the year 1084. He was a specialist in music and a poet. He is best known for compiling the Anthology of Yuefu Poetry. He also edited a no-longer extant anthology of other verse forms.

== Anthology of Yuefu Poetry ==
Guo Maoqian collected and published 5290 lyrical pieces, including variations on the same certain pieces, in his yuefu anthology; which he elaborately categorized, beginning with twelve main categories. Although this work is invaluable for preserving the words for so many songs, for the most part the music is lost.

== See also ==
- Classical Chinese poetry
- Classical Chinese poetry forms
- Hua Mulan
- Music Bureau
- Yuefu
