= Fu (poetry) =

Chinese poetry form

- Traditional Chinese: 賦
- Simplified Chinese: 赋
Transcriptions
Standard Mandarin
- Hanyu Pinyin: fù
- Wade–Giles: fu^{4}
- IPA: [fû]
Wu
- Romanization: fǔ
Hakka
- Romanization: fu^{4}
Yue: Cantonese
- Yale Romanization: fu
- Jyutping: fu^{3}
- IPA: [fu˧]
Southern Min
- Hokkien POJ: hù
Middle Chinese
- Middle Chinese: pjù
Old Chinese
- Baxter (1992): *p(r)jas
- Baxter–Sagart (2014): *p(r)a-s
- Zhengzhang: *mpas

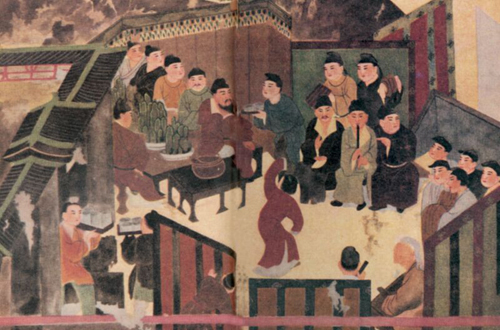
Song dynasty (960–1279) painting of a 2nd-century BC literary gathering at the court of Liu Wu, Prince of Liang

Fu (Chinese: 賦), often translated "rhapsody" or "poetic exposition", is a form of Chinese rhymed prose that was the dominant literary form in China during the Han dynasty (206 BC – AD 220). Fu are intermediary pieces between poetry and prose in which a place, object, feeling, or other subject is described and rhapsodized in exhaustive detail and from as many angles as possible. They were not sung like songs, but were recited or chanted. The distinguishing characteristics of fu include alternating rhyme and prose, varying line lengths, close alliteration, onomatopoeia, loose parallelism, and extensive cataloging of their topics. Classical fu composers tended to use as wide a vocabulary as possible in their compositions, and therefore fu often contain rare and archaic Chinese words and characters.

The fu genre came into being around the 3rd to 2nd centuries BC and continued to be regularly used into the Song dynasty (960–1279). fu were used as grand praises for the imperial courts, palaces, and cities, but were also used to write "fu on things", in which any place, object, or feeling was rhapsodized in exhaustive detail. The largest collections of historical fu are the Selections of Refined Literature (Wen Xuan), the Book of Han, New Songs from the Jade Terrace, and official dynastic histories.

There is no counterpart or form similar to the fu genre in Western literature. During a large part of the 20th century, fu poetry was harshly criticized by Chinese scholars as excessively ornate, lacking in real emotion, and ambiguous in its moral messages. Because of these historical associations, scholarship on fu poetry in China almost ceased entirely between 1949 and the end of the Cultural Revolution in 1976. Since then, study of fu has gradually returned to its previous level.

== History ==
=== Origins ===
The term "fu", when applied to Chinese literature, first appears in the Zhou dynasty (c. 1046–221 BC), where it meant "to present", as in poetic recitations. It was also one of the three literary devices traditionally assigned to the songs of the Classic of Poetry (Shijing). Over the course of the late 1st millennium BC, fu became the name of poetic expositions in which an author or composer created a comprehensive exposition and performed it as a rhapsody. Han dynasty historian Ban Gu in the "Monograph on Arts and Letters" defined fu as "to recite without singing" (不歌而誦; bù gē ér sòng).

Fu poetry is often viewed as a descendant of the "Verses of Chu" (Chu Ci songs) and the rhetorical expositions of the Intrigues of the Warring States (Zhanguo ce). During the golden age of fu in the 2nd century BC, many of the greatest fu composers were from the southwestern area of Shu (modern Sichuan Province). A chapter of Xunzi containing a series of riddles has been theorized to be the earliest known fu. The earliest preserved and definitely datable fu is Jia Yi's "Fu on the Owl" (鵩鳥賦; Fúniǎo fù), composed about 170 BC. Jia's surviving writings mention an earlier fu he wrote upon his exile to Changsha which he modeled upon Qu Yuan's "Encountering Sorrow" (Li Sao), but it has not survived to the present.

=== Han dynasty ===
==== Western Han ====
Fu achieved its greatest prominence during the early Han dynasty. Jia Yi's "Fu on the Owl", written around 170 BC, was composed following on the third year of his exile to Changsha, and uses much of the style of the Li Sao and other songs of the Verses of Chu. "Fu on the Owl", besides being the earliest known fu, is unusual in the author's extended use of philosophical reflection upon his own situation in life.

Emperor Wu of Han ascended the throne in 141 BC, and his 54-year reign is considered the golden age of "grand fu" (大賦; dàfù). Emperor Wu summoned famous fu writers to the imperial court in Chang'an, where many of them composed and presented fu to the entire court. The earliest grand fu of Emperor Wu's reign is "Seven Stimuli" (七發; Qī fā), by Mei Sheng (枚乘; d. 140 BC). In "Seven Stimuli", Mei Sheng acts as a Warring States-style travelling orator who tries to cure a Chu prince of an illness caused by overindulgence in sensual pleasures by pushing his senses to their limits with his fu descriptions.

純馳浩蜺，前後駱驛。
顒顒卬卬，椐椐彊彊，莘莘將將。
壁壘重堅，沓雜似軍行。
訇隱匈磕，軋盤涌裔，原不可當。

— Description of a tidal bore,
"Seven Stimuli", Mei Sheng (c. 141 BC)
Translation:

Revolving and rushing, a glistening halo,
Front and rear conjoined and connected.
Lofty and lofty, lifted and lifted,
Roiling and roiling, raging and raging,
Pressing and pressing, climbing and climbing.
A layered fortress of multiplied strength,
Doubled and diverse like the lines of troops.
Rumbling and roaring, booming and crashing,
Pushing and turning, surging and rolling –
Truly, it cannot be withstood!

— translated by Martin Kern

Of all the authors from the golden age of "grand fu" composition, Sima Xiangru is generally considered to be the greatest. A native of Chengdu, he was traditionally said to have been summoned to the imperial court after Emperor Wu happened to personally read his "Fu of Sir Vacuous" (子虛賦; Zǐxū fù), though this is almost certainly a story added later. After arriving in the capital around 136 BC, Sima Xiangru expanded his "Fu of Sir Vacuous" into his magnum opus, "Fu on the Imperial Park" (上林賦; Shànglín fù), generally considered the most famous fu of all. This work, whose original title was probably "Fu on the Excursion Hunt of the Son of Heaven" (天子遊獵賦; Tiānzǐ yóuliè fù), is a grand celebration of the Emperor's personal hunting park east of Chang'an, and is famed for its rich number of rare and difficult words and characters. If not for the survival of Chinese scholar Guo Pu's early 4th century AD annotations to "Fu on the Imperial Park", much of its ancient and esoteric terminology would now be unintelligible. The following portion of the rhymed list of names of minerals, precious stones, and flora and fauna from the first half of the "Fu on the Imperial Park" exemplifies much of the cataloging and rare terminology characteristic of grand fu:

其土則
丹青赭堊，
雌黃白坿，
錫碧金銀，
眾色炫耀，
照爛龍鱗。

其石則
赤玉玫瑰，
琳瑉昆吾，
瑊玏玄厲，
碝石碔砆。

[...]

其北則有陰林巨樹，
楩柟豫樟，
桂椒木蘭，
蘗離朱楊，
樝棃梬栗，
橘柚芬芳。

其上則有
鵷鶵孔鸞，
騰遠射干。
其下則有
白虎玄豹，
蟃蜒貙犴。

— Excerpt from "Fu of Sir Vacuous", Sima Xiangru (c. 137 BC)
Translation:

In the soil:
Cinnabar, azurite, ocher, white clay,
Orpiment, milky quartz,
Tin, prase, gold, and silver,
In manifold hues glisten and glitter,
Shining and sparkling like dragon scales.

Of stones there are:
Red jade, rose stone,
Orbed jades, vulcan stone,
Aculith, dark polishing stone,
Quartz, and the warrior rock.

[...]

To the north there is a shady grove,
Its trees are elm, nanmu, camphor,
Cinnamon, pepper, magnolia,
Cork, wild pear, vermilion willow,
Hawthorn, pear, date plum, chestnut,
Tangerine and pomelo sweet and fragrant.

In the treetops there are:
The phoenix, peacock, simurgh,
Leaping gibbon, and tree-jackal.
Beneath them there are:
The white tiger, black panther,
The manyan and leopard cat.

— translated by David Knechtges

The grand fu of the Western Han dynasty were read and recited as celebrations of pure poetic delight, and were the first pieces of Chinese literature to fuse both unrestrained entertainment and moral admonitions together in single works. However, after the reign of Emperor Wu, his court culture began to be criticized as having placed undue emphasis on the grandiose language in fu and therefore having missed opportunities to encourage moral restraint. The most prominent critic of "grand fu" was the other great fu writer of the Han dynasty: Yang Xiong. As a youth, Yang was an admirer and imitator of Sima Xiangru's fu, but later came to disapprove of grand fu. Yang believed that the original purpose of fu was to "indirectly admonish" (諷; fèng), but that the extended rhetorical arguments and complex vocabulary used in grand fu caused their hearers and readers to marvel at their aesthetic beauty while missing their moral messages. Yang juxtaposed early Han dynasty fu with the fu-like expositions in the Classic of Poetry, saying that while those in the Poetry provided moral standards, the fu of the Han poets "led to excess". While known as one of the fu masters of the Han dynasty, Yang's fu are generally known for their focus on admonishing readers and listeners to uphold moral values.

皇家赫而天居兮，萬方徂而星集。
貴寵煽以彌熾兮，僉守利而不戢。
前車覆而未遠兮，後乘驅而競及。
窮變巧於台榭兮，民露處而寢洷。
消嘉榖於禽獸兮，下糠粃而無粒。
弘寬裕於便辟兮，糾忠諫其駸急。

— Criticizing corrupt eunuchs and officials,
Fu on Recounting a Journey", Cai Yong (AD 159)
Translation:

The august house is resplendent, as if dwelling in Heaven;
From a myriad directions they come, gathering like stars.
The honored and favored fan their fires of lust even hotter;
All guard profit without cease.
When a front coach overturns not far ahead,
The rear teams dash forward, racing to catch up.
They exhaust their multifarious craft on terraces and towers,
While the people dwell in the open, sleep in the wet.
They waste fine grain on birds and beasts,
While those below eat chaff and husks without the kernels.
They grandly bestow liberal generosity on fawning flatterers,
But in impeaching loyal protest, they are swift and sure.

— translated by David Knechtges

==== Eastern Han ====
Two of the most famous fu writers of the Eastern Han period were the polymaths Zhang Heng and Cai Yong. Among Zhang Heng's large corpus of writings are a significant number of fu poems, which are the first to have been written in the shorter style that became typical of post-Han fu. Zhang's earliest known fu is "Fu on the Hot Springs" (溫泉賦; Wēnquán fù), which describes the hot springs at Mount Li (modern Huaqing Pool) which famously later became a favorite of Imperial Concubine Yang during the Tang dynasty. "Fu on the Two Metropolises" (二京賦; Èr jīng fù) is considered Zhang's masterpiece. Zhang spent ten years gathering material for the fu, a response to an earlier fu by Ban Gu that is a poetic comparison between the two capitals of the Han dynasty: Luoyang and Chang'an. Zhang's fu is highly satirical and cleverly mocks many aspects of the Western Han period, including Emperor Wu himself The piece contains long passages colorfully describing life in the two capitals in great detail, including the entertainment areas.

Cai Yong, like Zhang Heng, was a prolific writer in addition to his mathematical, astronomical, and musical interests. In 159 CE, Cai was summoned to Chang'an to perform on the guqin for the imperial court, but became ill shortly before arriving and returned to his home. Cai composed a poetic record of his journey in "Fu on Recounting a Journey" (述行賦; Shù xíng fù), his most well-known fu. In "Fu on Recounting a Journey", Cai cites examples of treacherous and dishonest rulers and officials from Chinese history, then criticizes the eunuchs of the capital for similar crimes.

A number of fu writers from the late 2nd and early 3rd centuries CE became considered great fu poets, and were noted for their descriptions of the chaos and destruction following the collapse of the Han dynasty. Wang Can, who lived as a refugee in Chu following the assassination of Dong Zhuo in 192 CE, wrote a famous fu entitled "Fu on Climbing the Tower" (登樓賦; Dènglóu fù) in which Wang movingly describes climbing a tower near Jingzhou and gazing longingly in the direction of his home in Luoyang. Poets often used subjects of descriptive fu poems to symbolize themselves, as in "Fu on the Parrot" (鸚鵡賦; Yīngwǔ fù), by Mi Heng, in which Mi uses a caged parrot as an allegory for a scholar whose talents go unrecognized and whose inability to control his tongue results in his captivity. During the Three Kingdoms period, the court of the warlord Cao Cao and his sons Cao Pi and Cao Zhi became a famous literary salon, and a number of fu poems from their court have survived to modern times.

惟西域之靈鳥兮，挺自然之奇姿。
體金精之妙質兮，合火德之明輝。
性辯慧而能言兮，才聰明以識機。
故其嬉游高峻，棲跱幽深。
飛不妄集，翔必擇林。
紺趾丹嘴，綠衣翠矜。
采采麗容，咬咬好音。

— Opening lines, "Fu on the Parrot", Mi Heng (c. AD 198)
Translation:

A marvelous bird from the Western Regions,
Manifests a wondrous natural beauty.
It embodies the sublime substance of the metal essence,
Embodies the shining brilliance of fire's power.
Gifted with wit and acuity, it is able to speak;
Intelligent and bright, it can perceive the imperceptible.
Thus, it plays and sports on lofty peaks,
Nests and perches in secluded vales.
Whenever it flies, it does not land at random;
Wherever it soars, it is sure to choose a good grove.
It has reddish-black feet, a vermilion beak,
Green coat, azure mantle.
Bright and colorful, lovely in appearance,
It chitters and chatters in a lovely voice.

— translated by David Knechtges

=== Six Dynasties ===
During the Six Dynasties period (220–589), fu remained a major part of contemporary poetry, although shi poetry was gradually increasing in popularity. Six Dynasties fu are generally much shorter and less extravagant than Han dynasty fu, likely due to a tradition of composing works entirely in parallel couplets that arose during the period. While lyrical fu and "fu on things" had been starkly different forms in the Han dynasty, after the 2nd century CE the distinction mostly disappeared. Although the extravagant fu style of the Han mostly disappeared, "fu on things" continued to be widely written.

Xie Lingyun is one of the best-known poets of the entire Six Dynasties period, second only to Tao Yuanming. In contrast to his older contemporary Tao, Xie is known for the difficult language, dense allusions, and frequent parallelisms of his poetry. Xie's greatest fu is "Fu on Dwelling in the Mountains" (山居賦; Shān jū fù), a Han-style "grand fu" describing Xie's personal estate that borrows its style from the famous "Fu on the Imperial Park" by Sima Xiangru. Like classical Han fu, the poem uses a large number of obscure and rare characters, but "Fu on Dwelling in the Mountains" is unique in that Xie included his own annotations to the poem, without which the poem would be nearly incomprehensible.

During the Liang dynasty (502–587), fu continued to be a popular form of literature, though it began to merge with the popular five- and seven-syllable poetry forms, which completely eclipsed fu during the Tang dynasty. Some fu pieces, such as Shen Yue's "Fu on Dwelling in the Suburbs" (郊居賦; Jiāo jū fù)—an homage to Xie Lingyun's "Fu on Dwelling in the Mountains"—followed the traditional forms and subjects of classical fu, but an increasing number did not. "Fu on Lotus-picking" (採蓮賦; Cǎi lián fù), by Xiao Gang (later Emperor Jianwen of Liang), is a short, lyrical fu that mixes freely with popular lyric poetry, and portrayed southern China as a romantic land of pleasure and sensuality. Lotus-picking was an activity traditionally associated with peasant women, but in the early 5th century became a popular topic in fu and poetry.

Yu Xin is generally considered the last great fu poet of Chinese history. Yu, like Yan Zhitui, was born in the south but forced to relocate to northern China after the south's defeat, and spent the rest of his career writing of the loss of the south as a loss of an entire culture and way of life. Yu's most famous piece is "Fu on Lamenting the South" (哀江南賦; Āi Jiāngnán fù), in which he describes his life's experiences in the context of the larger context of the destruction of the south and its culture.

=== Tang and Song dynasties ===
The fu genre changed rapidly during the Tang dynasty (618–907). During the early Tang, a new form of fu called "regulated fu" (律賦; lǜfù) supplanted the original form. "Regulated fu" had strict rules of form and expression, and required the use of consistent rhymes throughout each piece. Additionally, rules were created to govern the arrangement of tones in each poem, as the introduction of Buddhist texts written in Sanskrit and Pali had stimulated the Chinese to methodical study of their own language and the identification of the four tones of Middle Chinese. Beginning in the Tang dynasty, these "regulated fu" were required for the composition sections of the imperial examinations. Tang writers added new topics to the traditional subjects of fu, such as purely moral topics or scenes from Chinese antiquity. The "parallel fu" (駢賦; piánfù) was another variant of the fu developed in the Tang, and was only used for rhetorical compositions.

In 826, Tang poet Du Mu's poem "Fu on E-pang Palace" (阿房宫賦; Ēpáng gōng fù) (Note: Although The Cambridge History of Chinese Literature, vol. 1, p. 350, gives the name of the palace as "Apang", most scholarly dictionaries read the first character 阿 as ē, not ā, in this case.) laid the foundation for a new form of fu called "prose fu" (文賦; wénfù), in which prose is freely rhymed. This form of fu became the dominant fu form during the late Tang and the Song dynasty (960–1279). By the 9th and 10th centuries, traditional fu had become mainly historical pursuits, and were largely read and copied because of their inclusion on the imperial examinations.

== Topics ==
=== "Fu on things" ===
Between 130 and 100 BC, Emperor Wu greatly expanded China's territory into Central Asia, northern Vietnam, and the Korean Peninsula through a series of military campaigns and invasions. As the expansion progressed, many foreign plants, animals, goods, and rarities were brought to the imperial capital at Chang'an. Throughout the Han dynasty, court officials and poets often composed special fu called "fu on things" (詠物賦; yǒngwù fù) on these new and unusual things, in which they described and catalogued extensively. These "'fu on things" became a major genre in fu poetry, and cover a vast number of instruments, objects, and phenomena.

若迺玄律窮，嚴氣升。
焦溪涸，湯谷凝。
火井滅，溫泉冰。
沸潭無湧，炎風不興。
北戶墐扉，裸壤垂繒。
於是河海生雲，朔漠飛沙。
連氛累䨠，揜日韜霞。
霰淅瀝而先集，雪粉糅而遂多。

— Excerpt from "Fu on Snow", Xie Huilian (Chinese: 謝惠連; c. 407–433)
Translation:

Now, as the time of darkness reaches its peak, and harsh air is ascendant,
Scorching Creek dries up, Scalding Vale freezes,
Fire wells are extinguished, hot springs ice over,
Frothing pools no longer bubble, fiery winds do not rise.
On north-facing doors, panels are plastered;
In the land of the naked, men drape themselves in silk.
And then, clouds rise on river and sea; sand flies on northern deserts.
Unbroken vapors, piled up haze, shroud the Sun, veil the clouds.
First sleet comes pattering down; then snow, copiously cluttered, falls harder and harder.

— Knechtges translation

Ban Zhao, one of the most famous female poets of Chinese history, wrote a well-known fu during the reign of Emperor He of Han entitled "Fu on the Great Bird" (大雀賦; Dà què fù), believed to be a description of an ostrich brought to the Han court from Parthia around AD 110. Scholar Ma Rong wrote two well-known fu on ancient board games: "Fu on Chaupar" (樗蒲賦; Chūpú fù), which the Chinese believed to actually have been invented by Laozi after he departed west out of China, and "Fu on Encirclement Chess" (圍棋賦; Wěiqí fù), one of the earliest known descriptions of the game Go. Han dynasty librarian Wang Yi, best known as the compiler of the received version of the Verses of Chu, wrote several object-description fu in the early 2nd century AD, such as "Fu on the Lychee" (荔枝賦; Lìzhī fù), the earliest known poetic description of the lychee fruit.

The literary salon of Cao Pi's court produced a number of notable "fu on things" in which a group of poets known as the Seven Masters of the Jian'an period each composed their own version of the fu. During this period, Cao Pi was once presented with a large agate of unusual quality which Cao had made into a bridle. Each of the men composed their own "Fu on the Agate Bridle" (瑪瑙勒賦; Mǎnǎo lè fù) for the occasion. Another object-description fu from the Cao court is "Fu on the Musāragalva Bowl" (硨磲碗賦; Chēqú wǎn fù), (Note: The Cambridge History of Chinese Literature, vol 1, p. 170, gives the pinyin transliteration of "Fu on the Musāragalva Bowl" as Jūqú wǎn fù, using an alternate reading of the character 車/硨. The Guangyun and most modern scholarly dictionaries give chē, not jū.) which was a bowl made of a coral- or shell-like substance from somewhere near India, which was then known as the "Western Regions".

One of the poet Shu Xi's (束皙; AD 263–302) fu has become well known in the history of Chinese cuisine: his "Fu on Pasta" (餅賦; Bǐng fù) is an encyclopedic description of a wide variety of dough-based foods, including noodles, steamed buns, and dumplings, which had not yet become the traditional Chinese foods they are in modern times. Western Jin poet Fu Xian's "Fu on Paper" (紙賦; Zhǐ fù) is well known as an early description of writing paper, which had only been invented about 150 years earlier.

=== Sociopolitical protest ===
Part of the legacy associated with the fu is its use as a form of sociopolitical protest, such as the theme of the loyal minister who has been unjustly exiled by the ruler or those in power at the court, rather than receiving the promotion and respect which he truly deserves. In the Verses of Chu, one of the works attributed to Qu Yuan is the "Li Sao", which is one of the earliest known works in this tradition, both as ancestral to the fu as well as its incorporation of political criticism as a theme of poetry. The theme of unjust exile is related to the development of Xiaoxiang poetry, or the poetry stylistically or thematically based upon lamenting the unjust exile of the poet, either directly, or allegorically through the use of the persona of a friend or historical figure (a safer course in the case of a poet-official who might be punished for any too blatant criticism of the current emperor). During the Han dynasty, along with the development of the fu stylistically, the idea that it incorporate political criticism through indirection and allegory also developed. Han dynasty historian and author Ban Gu in his Book of Han pointedly refers to a fu by Qu Yuan as a literary example of the use of the theme of the loyal minister who has been unjustly exiled, rather than receiving the promotion and respect which he truly deserves. As Hellmut Wilhelm puts it: "...the Han fu can easily be classified into a limited number of types. All types have one feature in common: almost without exception they can be and have been interpreted as voicing criticism—either of the ruler, the ruler's behavior, or certain political acts or plans of the ruler; or of the court officials or the ruler's favorites; or, generally, of the lack of discrimination in the employment of officials. The few examples that are positive in tone recommend the authors or their peers for employment, or even contain specific political suggestions. In short, almost all fu have a political purport, and, in addition, almost all of them deal with the relationship between the ruler and his officials." Seen in context, Ban Gu's discussion of Qu Yuan and the Chu sao style is less to the point of the actual evolutionary path of the fu and more to the point that the main purpose of the fu is political and social criticism through poetic indirection: thus, in fu, paradoxically, the "fantastic descriptions and an overflowing rhetoric...can be reduced to...restraint", as the sociopolitical criticism which was key to the fu was constrained within a very subtle, elaborately indirect, occasional, and allusive mode.

== Collections ==
Fu pieces comprise the first main category in the Wen Xuan (Selections of Refined Literature), an early Chinese literary anthology which is still extant. The Selections collects all known fu pieces from the early Han dynasty to its compilation in the 6th century CE, during the Liang dynasty; it has since been the traditional source for studying classical fu.

In the late 17th and early 18th centuries, during the reign of the Kangxi Emperor, scholar Chen Yuanlong (1652–1736) compiled a collection of all known fu extant in his day, publishing his collection in 1706 as Collection of Fu Through the Ages (歷代賦彙; Lìdài fù huì). Chen's Collection in total contains 4,155 fu.

== See also ==
- Classical Chinese poetry forms
- Dong Zhongshu
- Han poetry
