= Yuefu =

Chinese poetic form

- Traditional Chinese: 樂府
- Simplified Chinese: 乐府
Transcriptions
Standard Mandarin
- Hanyu Pinyin: yuèfǔ
- Bopomofo: ㄩㄝˋㄈㄨˇ
- Gwoyeu Romatzyh: yuehfuu
- Wade–Giles: yüeh^{4}-fu^{3}
- IPA: [ɥêfù]
Yue: Cantonese
- Yale Romanization: ngohk-fú
- Jyutping: ngok^{6}-fu^{2}
Southern Min
- Tâi-lô: ga̍k-hú

Yuefu are Chinese poems composed in a folk song style. The term originally literally meant "Music Bureau", a reference to the imperial Chinese governmental organization(s) originally charged with collecting or writing the lyrics, later the term yuefu was applied to later literary imitations or adaptations of the Music Bureau's poems. The use of fu in yuefu is different from the other Chinese term fu that refers to a type of poetry or literature: although homonyms in English, the other fu (simplified Chinese: 赋; traditional Chinese: 賦; pinyin: fù) is a rhapsodic poetry/prose form of literature.

The term yuefu covers original folk songs, court imitations and versions by known poets (such as those of Li Bai). As opposed to what appears to be more of an authentic anonymous folk verse which was collected by the Music Bureau, verse written deliberately in this style, often by known authors, is often referred to as "literary yuefu". The lines of the yuefu can be of uneven length, reflecting its origins as a type of fixed-rhythm verse derived from now lost folk ballad tunes; although, later, the five-character fixed-line length became common. However, as a term of classification yuefu has a certain elusiveness when it comes to strict definition. Furthermore, the literary application of the term yuefu in the modern sense of a classical form of poetry seems not to have had contemporary application until considerably after the end of the Han dynasty, thus adding a certain historically ambiguity due to its use in this literary sense not having occurred until centuries after the actual development of this type of verse itself. The use of the term yuefu to generically refer to this form of poetry does not seem to appear until the late fifth century CE.

== Origin ==
The word yuefu came first into being in Qin dynasty (221 BC – 206 BC). Yue (樂) means "music", fu (府) means "bureau": put together yuefu means "Music Bureau". Yuefu is particularly associated with the Han poetry of the Han dynasty (206 BC – 220 AD), and became a royal government-managed music involving collecting, writing or performing folk songs and ballads in 112 BC. Afterwards, people called poems composed in this folk song style yuefu.

== Music Bureau yuefu ==
The yuefu poems of the Han dynasty have been held in high regard over the history of Chinese poetry. The Han yuefu tradition inherited the traditional realistic approach of the Shi Jing's, "feeling of funeral music, causes behind the affairs". Folk songs collected or written by the Musical Department in the Han dynasty were typically done from the perspective of a certain set of personas—vividly and visually mirroring the perceived typical characters of people whose lives mirrored the different social roles which typified the society of the Han dynasty.

== Literary yuefu ==
=== Han dynasty ===
During the last century or two of the Han dynasty, the poets of the time were noted for writing "literary yuefu", that is yuefu inspired by or imitating the Music Bureau pieces.

=== Jian'an ===
During the Jian'an period at the end of the Han dynasty and into the Three Kingdoms period yuefu continued to be written. Often, the yuefu appearing in Jian'an poetry more personally emotional than the Music Bureau pieces.

=== Six Dynasties ===
During the Six Dynasties era, a form of yuefu using regular five-character quatrains (or paired couplets) similar to the jueju appears in the Midnight Songs poetry.

== New yuefu ==
During the Tang dynasty certain poets wrote a series of new poems in great variety and profoundness influenced by even sometimes to the point of recycling the old titles and themes of yuefu of the Han dynasty. The poets behind this "new yuefu" style included many famous poets, such as Li Bai, Du Fu, Bai Juyi, and Yuan Zhen, who participated in the development of this new style and the creation of various individual poems inspired by and inspirational to it. The patterns of new yuefu can be quite free or can take the form of five characters per line or the seven-character per line poems; however, the topics are often conventional. Similar to the ballad tradition of the earlier yuefu, many of the Tang yuefu are spoken in the voice of some persona, often that of a hunter, a peasant girl, or a soldier at the frontier. Similarly, the subjects and themes of the Tang yuefu vary from simply providing song lyrics, to engaging in social satire or criticism, literary exercise, lamentations at the departure of friends, attempts to visit not-to-be-found-hermits, and romantic love in relationship to singing "girls", dancers or other professional entertainers, or the feelings of or for the ladies of the palace harems. The Yuefu style of poetry persisted into the late Tang Dynasty and was used by poets such as Nie Yizhong (聶夷中), Du Xunhe, and Pi Rixiu.

== Main compositions ==
=== Han dynasty, Three Kingdoms, and Northern and Southern dynasties ===
"Mulberry By Road" (陌上桑)， "Armed Escort" (羽林郎), "White Hair Intonation" (白头吟), "Thinking is Being" (有所思), "The Old Soldier's Return" (十五从军征), "The Peacocks Fly to the South and the East" (孔雀东南飞) and "Shang Ye" (上邪).

=== Tang dynasty ===
"The Moon at the Fortified Pass" (关山月; 關山月; guānshān yuè) by Li Bai and the "Songs of the Border" (塞上曲; sàishàng qǔ) genre.

== Bibliography ==
- Birrell, Anne (1993) [1988]. Popular songs and ballads of Han China (paperback ed.). Honolulu: University of Hawaii Press. ISBN 978-0-8248-1548-6. LCCN 93018715. OCLC 27768349. Original edition: London: Unwin Hyman. ISBN 978-0-04-440037-0.
- Watson, Burton (1971). CHINESE LYRICISM: Shih Poetry from the Second to the Twelfth Century. (New York: Columbia University Press). ISBN 0-231-03464-4

== See also ==
- Bunka Shūreishū
- Classical Chinese poetry forms
