= Six Dynasties =

Period of Chinese history (220–589)

Six Dynasties (Chinese: 六朝; pinyin: Liù Cháo; 220–589 or 222–589) is a collective term for six Han-ruled Chinese dynasties that existed from the early 3rd century AD to the late 6th century AD, between the end of the Eastern Han dynasty and the beginning of the Sui dynasty. The Six Dynasties period overlapped with the era of the Sixteen Kingdoms, a chaotic warring period in northern China after the collapse of the Western Jin dynasty, as well as the Northern and Southern dynasties period. The terms "Wei, Jin, Southern and Northern dynasties" (魏晉南北朝) and "Three Kingdoms, Two Jins, Southern and Northern dynasties" (三國兩晉南北朝) are also used by Chinese historians to refer to the same historical era as the Six Dynasties, although the three terms do not refer to the same group of dynasties.

== Six Dynasties ==
=== Southern Six Dynasties ===
The primary, southern six dynasties based in Jiankang (modern-day Nanjing) were:

1. Eastern Wu dynasty (222–280)
2. Eastern Jin dynasty (317–420)
3. Liu Song dynasty (420–479)
4. Southern Qi dynasty (479–502)
5. Liang dynasty (502–557)
6. Chen dynasty (557–589)

The Veritable Records of Jiankang (建康實錄) by Xu Song (許嵩) of the Tang dynasty provides a historical account of Jiankang, which gave rise to this list.

=== Northern Six Dynasties ===
There were also six northern, twice interrupted and once overlapping, dynasties:

1. Cao Wei dynasty (220–266)
2. Western Jin dynasty (266–316)
3. Northern Wei dynasty (386–535)
4. Northern Qi dynasty (550–577)
5. Northern Zhou dynasty (557–581)
6. Sui dynasty (581–619)

== Poetry in the Six Dynasties ==
The Six Dynasties was an important era in the history of Chinese poetry, especially remarkable for its frank (for Classical Chinese poetry) descriptions of love and beauty. Especially important, and frequently translated into English, is the anthology New Songs from the Jade Terrace, compiled by Xu Ling (507–83), under the patronage of Crown Prince Xiao Gang (Later Emperor Jian Wen) of the Liang dynasty. Also significant, is the Zi Ye, or "Lady Midnight" style, supposedly originating with an eponymously named fourth-century professional singer of the Jin dynasty.

== Culture ==
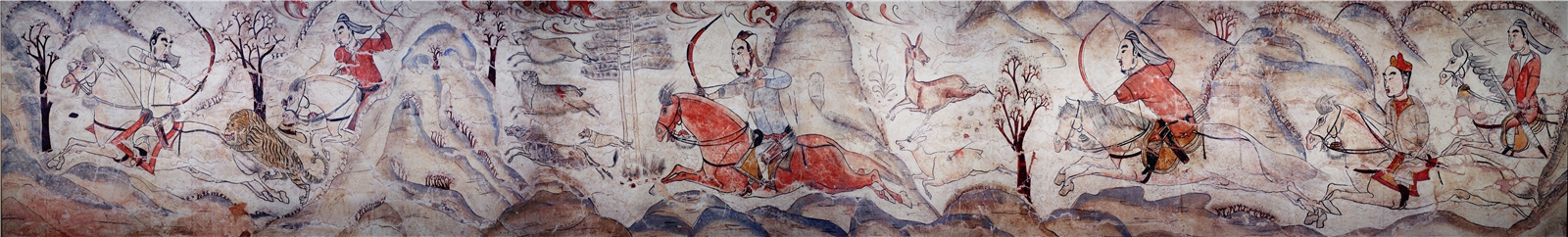
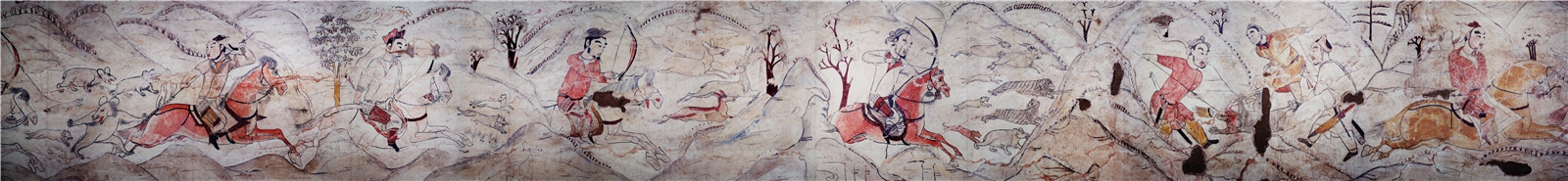
Murals from a tomb of Northern Qi dynasty (550–577) in Jiuyuangang, Xinzhou, showing a rural hunting scene on horseback

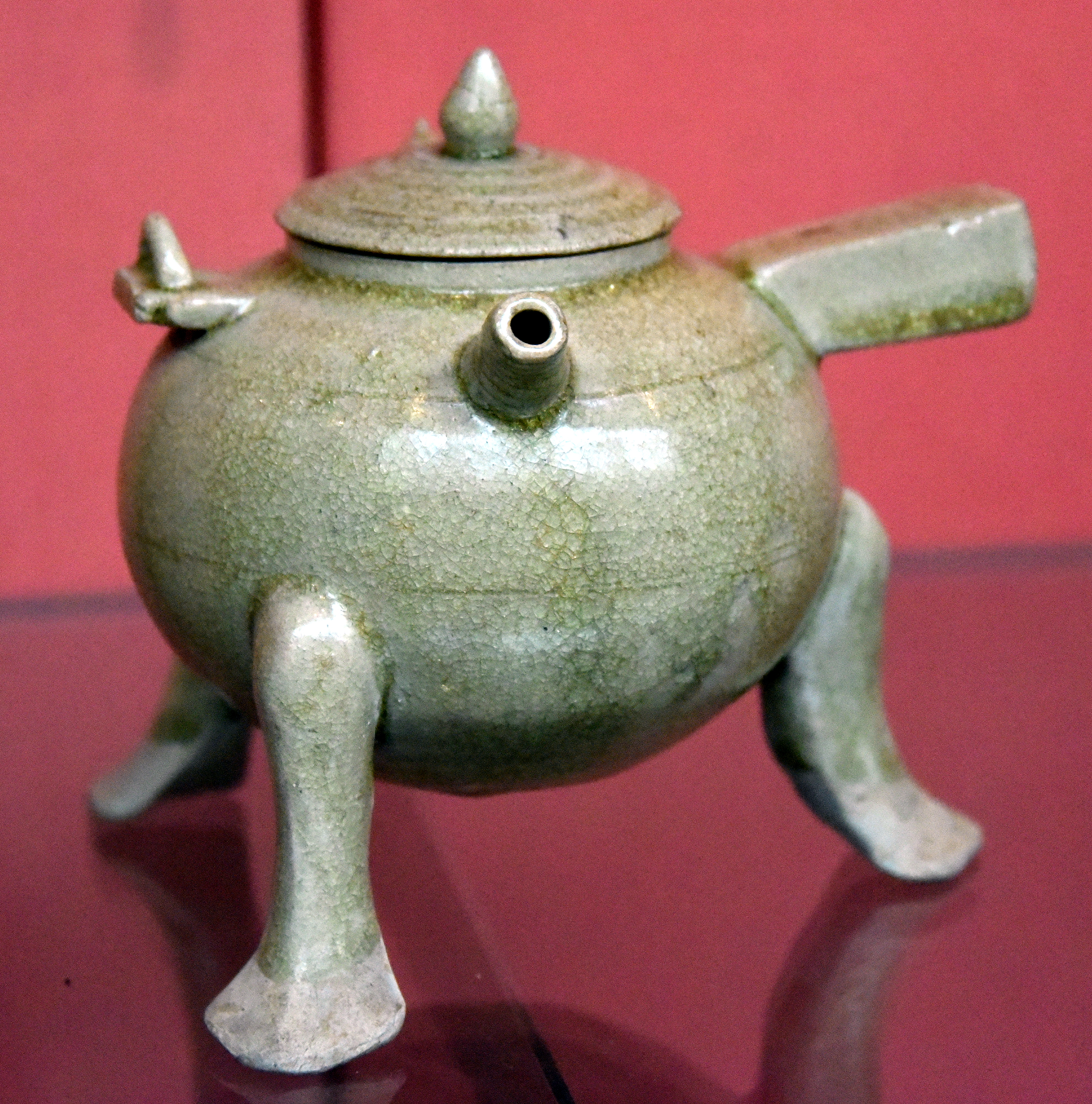
Ewer, lidded tripod with handles, used for heating certain alcoholic drinks. Stoneware with pale green (celadon) glaze. Six Dynasties. Victoria and Albert Museum

The Six Dynasties period was the first time in history that the political centre of China was located in the south, which spurred a surge in population as well as economic and cultural development. This transformed southern China from remote territories to the economic centre that came to rival the north from Tang dynasty onwards.

After the fall of the Han Dynasty, where well-documented male homosexuality occurred, Imperial China begun an era of further homosexual openness. Terms like “Nanfeng” that specifically describe male homosexuality emerged from the early days in the Six Dynasties.

Buddhism, which first reached China via the Silk Road during the Eastern Han dynasty, flourished in the Six Dynasties (and simultaneously in the Northern Dynasties) and has been a major religion in China ever since.

The Japanese scholar Tanigawa Michio analysed the Six Dynasties period to test general theories of China's historical development. Some thinkers, Tanigawa writes, argue that China followed the set European pattern which Marxists and liberal thinkers thought to be universal, that is, from ancient slavery to medieval feudalism to modern capitalism, while others argue that "Chinese society was extraordinarily saturated with stagnancy, as compared to the West, and they assume that it existed in a qualitatively different historical world from Western society." In other words, there is an argument between those who see "uni-linear, monistic world history" and those who conceive of a "two-tracked or multitracked world history." Tanigawa's conclusion is that China did not have "feudalism" in the sense that Marxists use, but that the military governments did not develop a military aristocracy of the sort that developed in Europe. The period established social and political patterns which shaped China's history from that point on.

== See also ==
- Chinese sovereign
- Dynasties of China
- History of China
- Nanjing (Nanking)
- Three Kingdoms
- Jin dynasty (266–420)
- Sixteen Kingdoms
- Northern dynasties
- Southern dynasties
