= Arts of China =

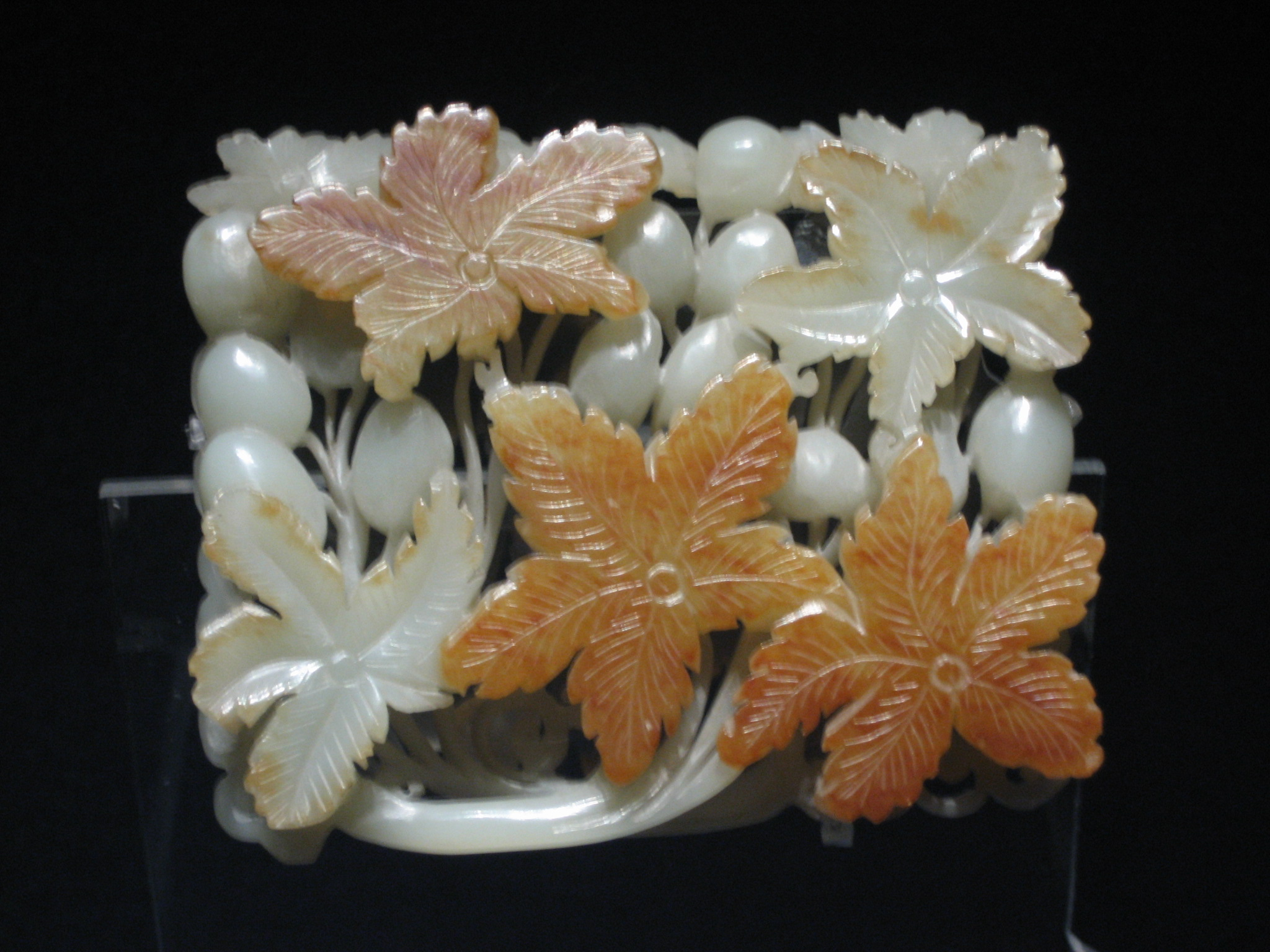
Chinese Jade ornament with flower design, Jin dynasty (1115–1234 AD), Shanghai Museum.

The arts of China (simplified Chinese: 中国艺术; traditional Chinese: 中國藝術) have varied throughout its ancient history, divided into periods by the ruling dynasties of China and changing technology, but still containing a high degree of continuity. Different forms of art have been influenced by great philosophers, teachers, religious figures and even political leaders. The arrival of Buddhism and modern Western influence produced especially large changes. Chinese art encompasses fine arts, folk arts and performance arts.

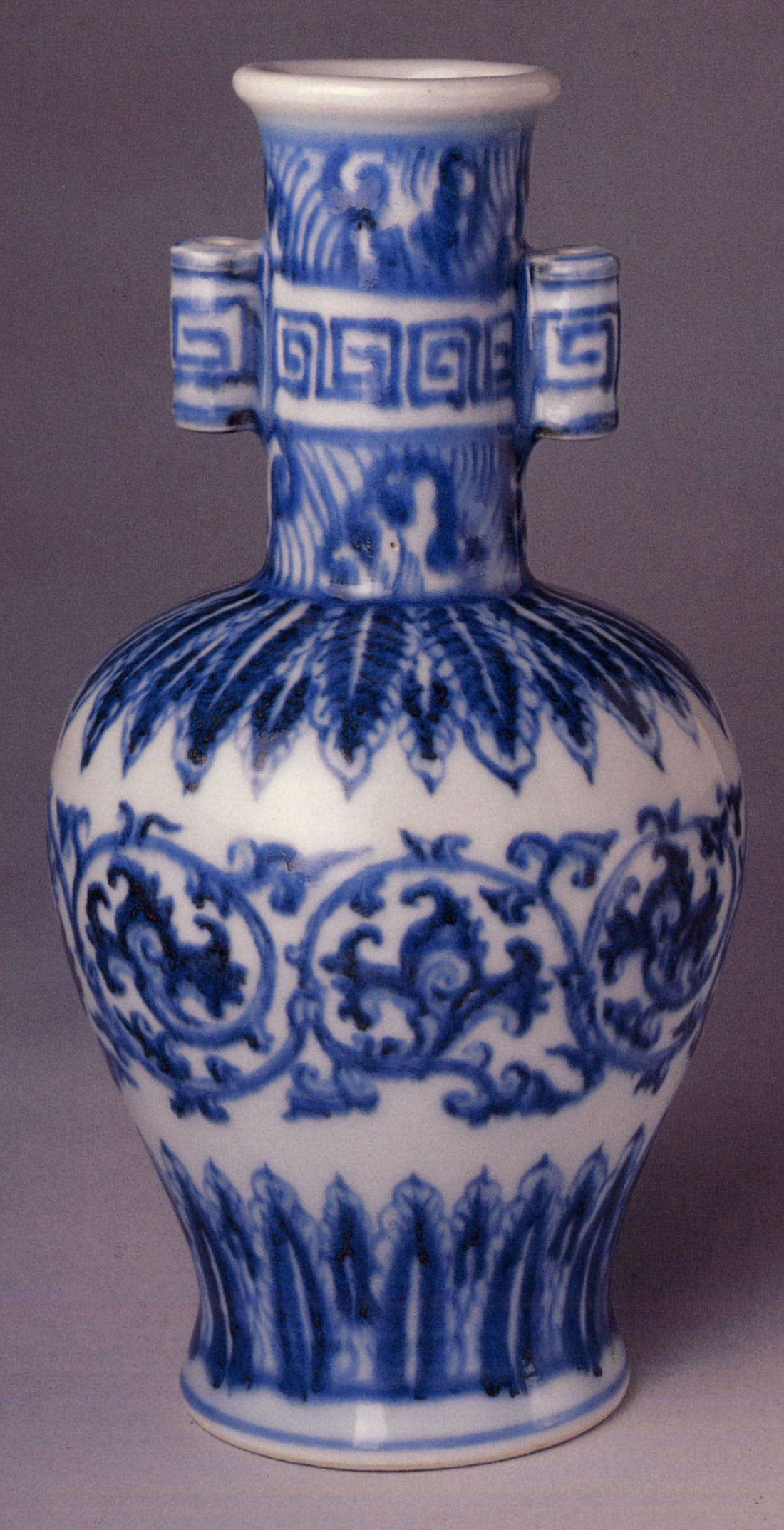
Ming dynasty Xuande mark and period (1426–35) imperial blue and white vase. The Metropolitan Museum of Art, New York. 明宣德 景德鎮窯青花貫耳瓶, 纽约大都博物馆

== General history ==
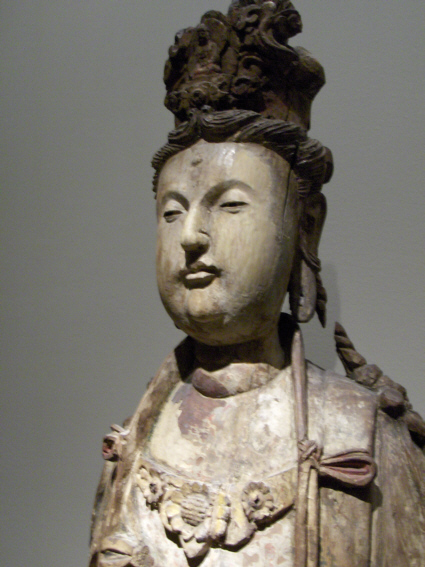
A statue of a Bodhisattva from the Song dynasty (960–1279 AD).

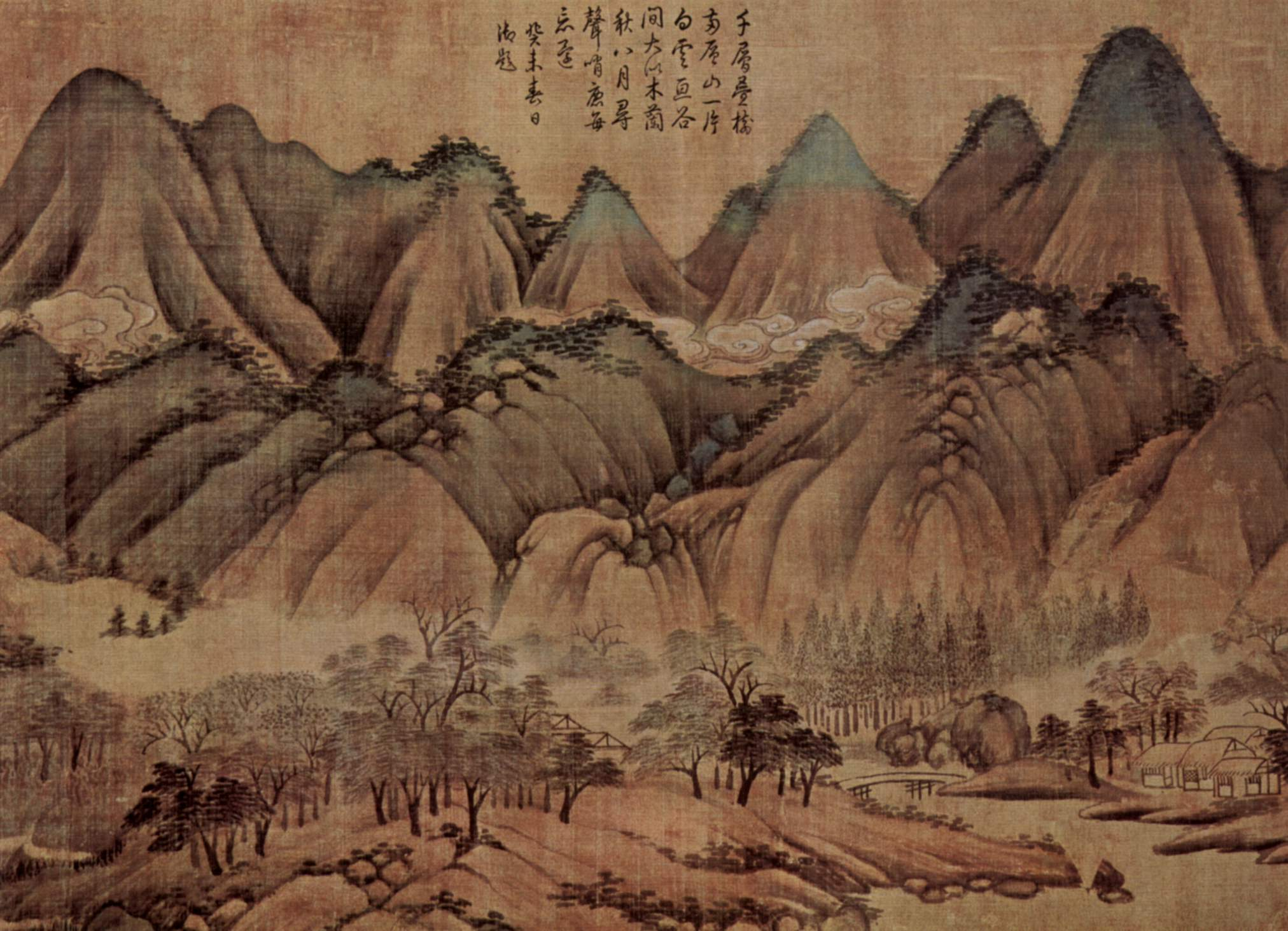
Green Hills and White Clouds, by Gao Kogong, 1270–1310 AD.

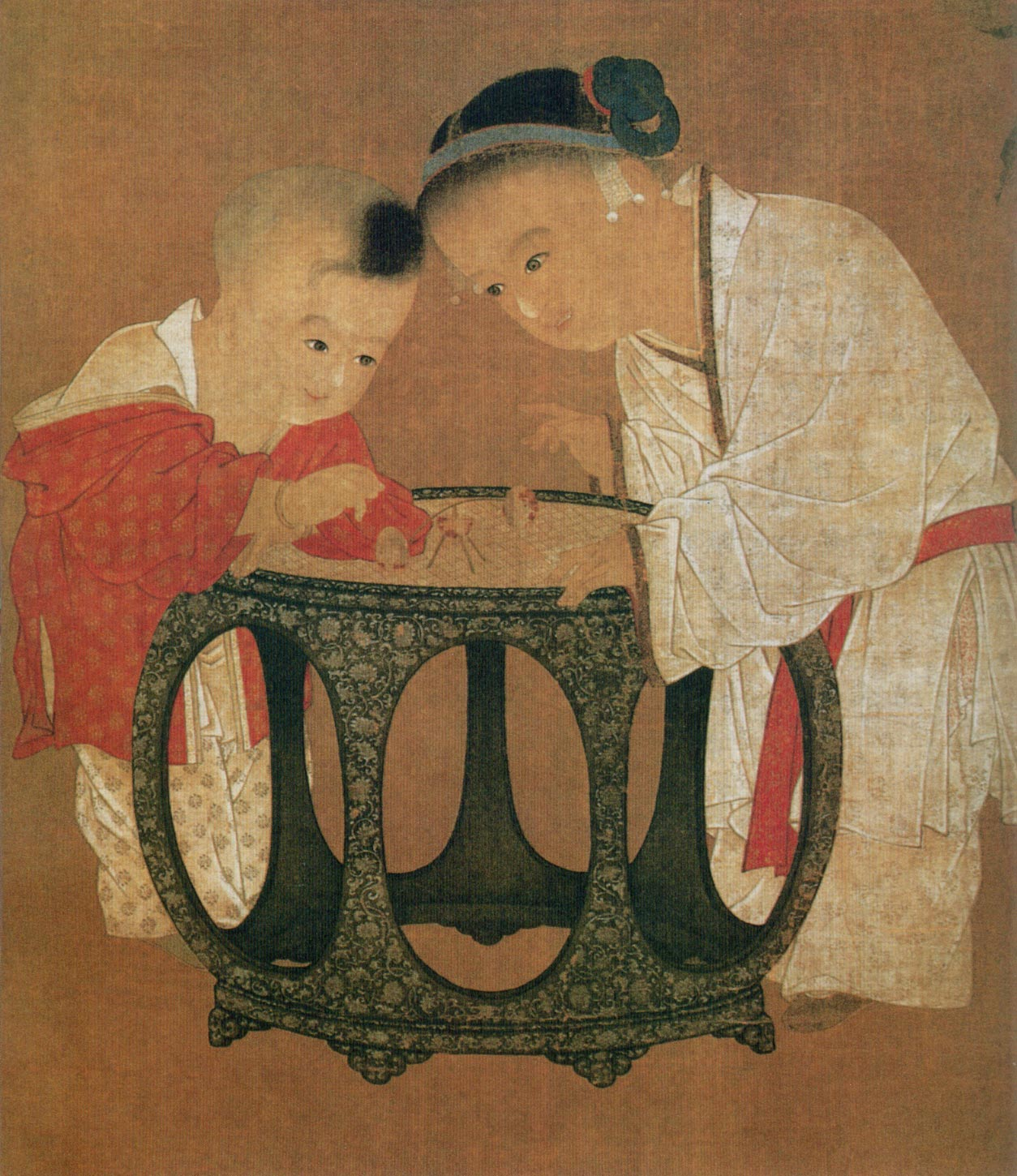
"Children Playing in an Autumn Courtyard" (秋庭婴戏图), close-up detail of a small er vertical-scroll painting on silk by Su Hanchen (苏汉臣, active 1130–1160s AD)

Early forms of art in China were made from pottery and jade in the Neolithic period, to which was added bronze in the Shang dynasty. The Shang are most remembered for their blue casting, noted for its clarity of detail. Early Chinese music and poetry was influenced by the Classic of Poetry, Confucius and the Chinese poet and statesman Qu Yuan.

In early imperial China, porcelain was introduced and was refined to the point that in English the word china has become synonymous with high-quality porcelain. Around the 1st century AD, Buddhism arrived in China, though it did not become popular until the 4th century. At this point, Chinese Buddhist art began to flourish, a process which continued through the 20th century. It was during the period of Imperial China that calligraphy and painting became highly appreciated arts in court circles, with a great deal of work done on silk until well after the invention of paper.

Buddhist architecture and sculpture thrived in the Sui and Tang dynasty. Of which, the Tang dynasty was particularly open to foreign influence. Buddhist sculpture returned to a classical form, inspired by Indian art of the Gupta period. Towards the late Tang dynasty, all foreign religions were outlawed to support Taoism.

== Categories ==
A Thousand Peaks and Myriad Ravines by Wang Hui, 1693.

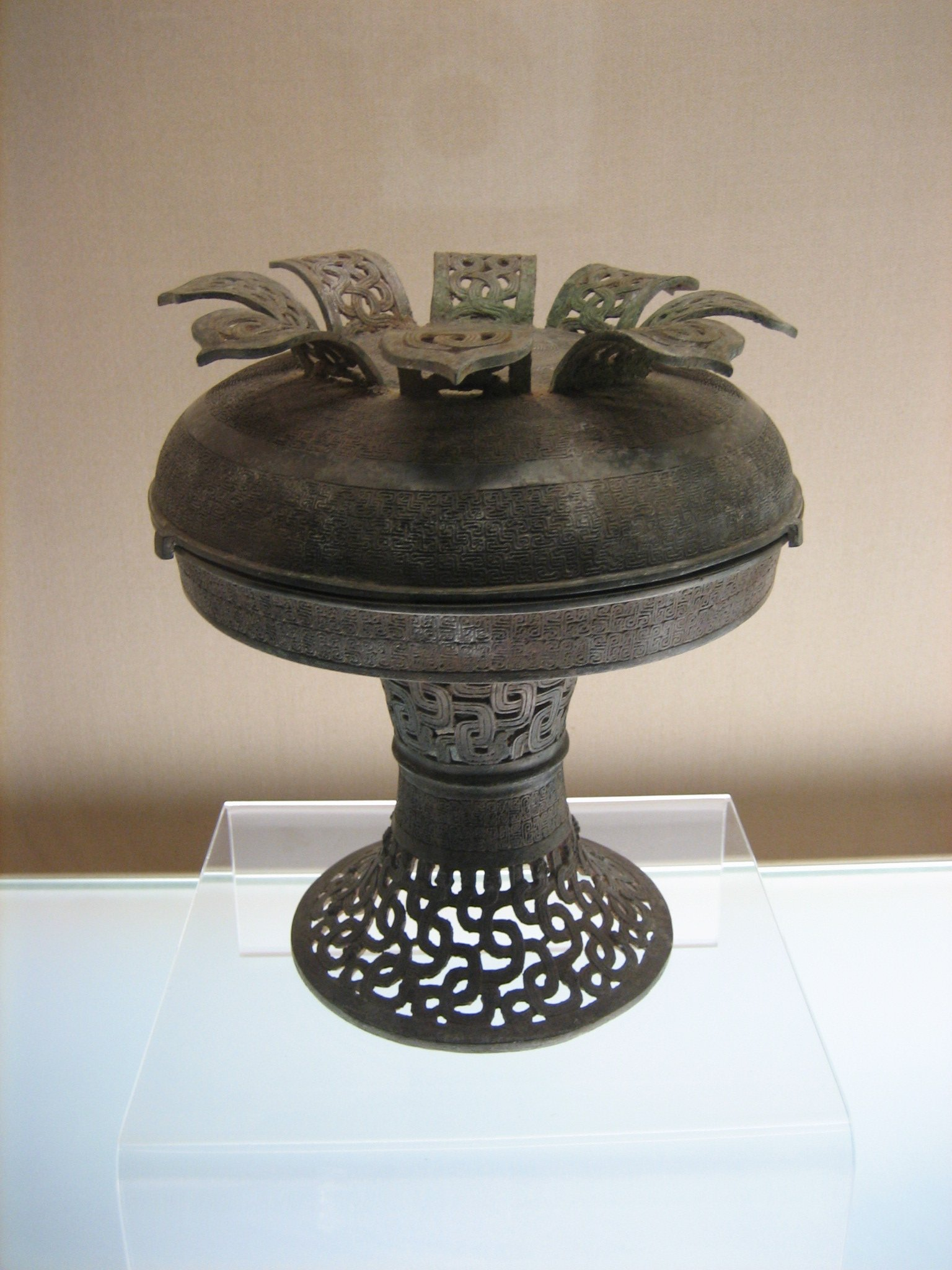
Chinese pu vessel with interlaced dragon design, Spring and Autumn period (722 BC–481 BC).

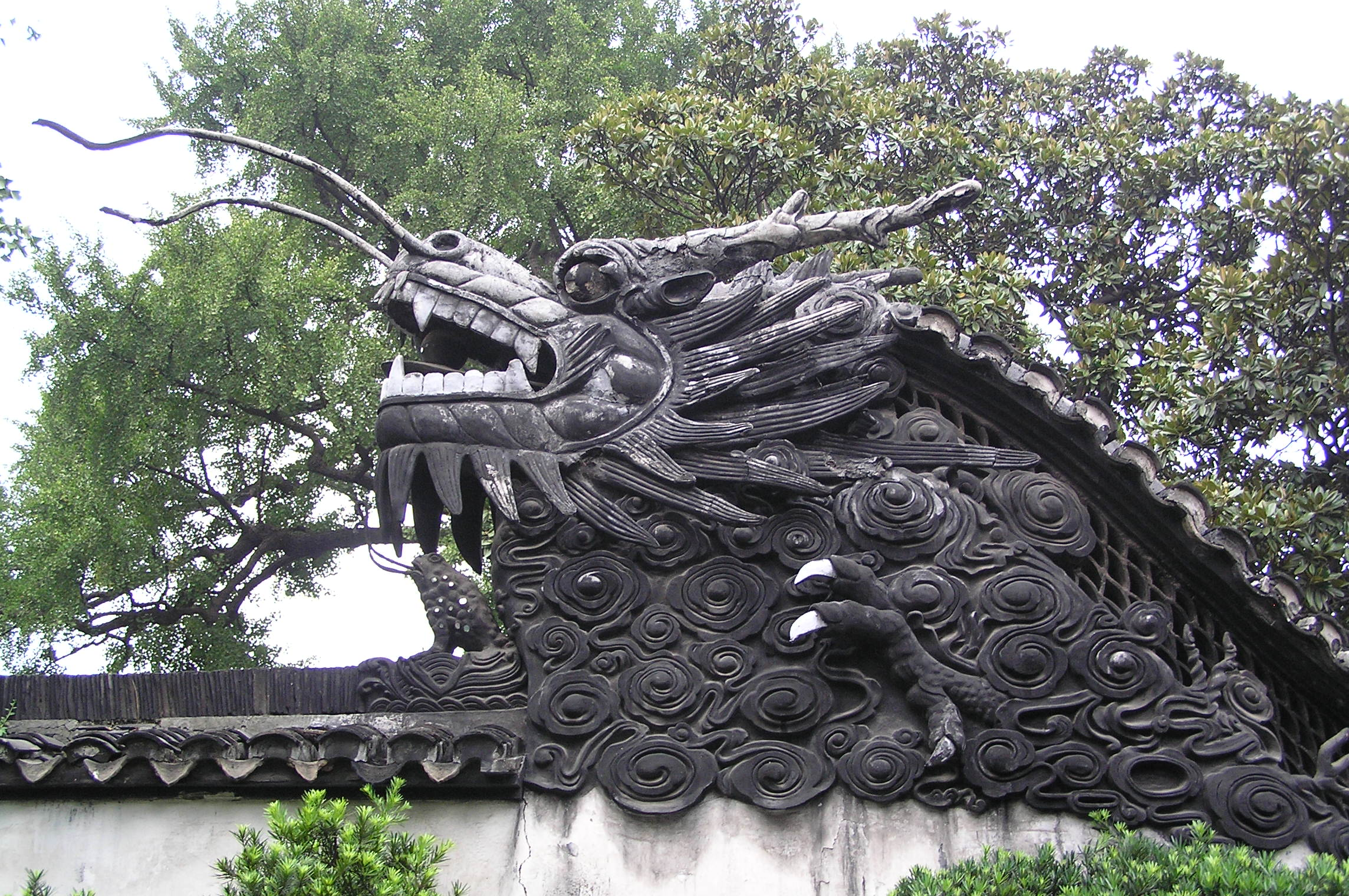
Chinese dragon sculpture

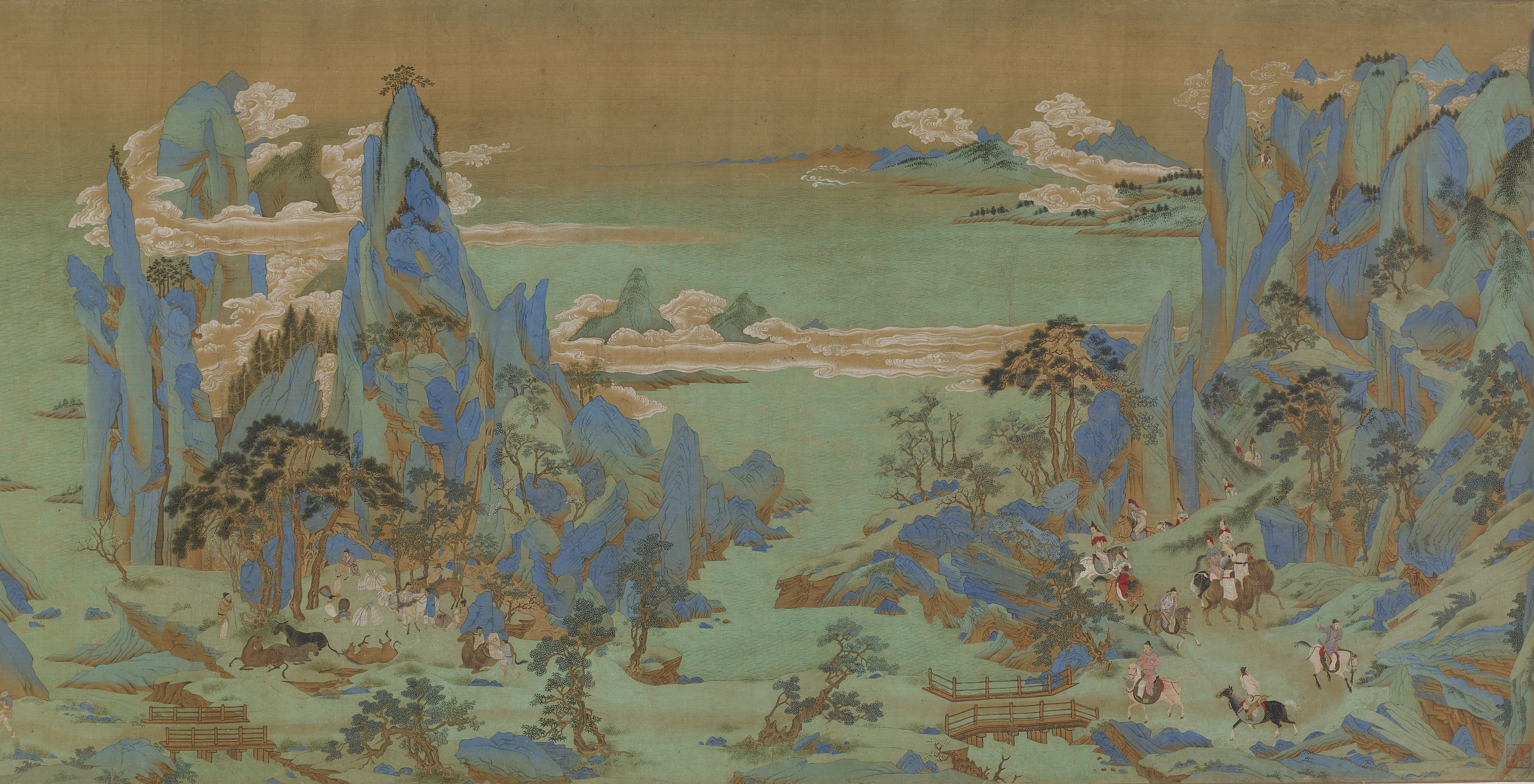
Emperor Xuanzong's Journey to Sichuan, a Ming dynasty painting after Qiu Ying (1494–1552).

Art type	Main art	Major category	Start era
Chinese folk art	Paper cutting	Chinese paper cutting	Eastern Han dynasty
Chinese folk art	Paper cutting	Chinese paper folding	Eastern Han dynasty
Chinese folk art	Puppetry	Glove puppetry	
Chinese folk art	Puppetry	Chinese shadow theatre	Han dynasty
Chinese folk art	Handicraft	Chinese knot	Tang dynasty
Literature	Chinese literature	Chinese classic texts	Spring and Autumn period
Literature	Chinese literature	Chinese poetry	Spring and Autumn period
Literature	Chinese literature	Chinese historiography	Spring and Autumn period
Literature	Chinese literature	Chinese dictionary	Zhou dynasty
Visual art
Visual art	Pottery	Chinese ceramics	Palaeolithic
Visual art	Embroidery	Chinese embroidery	Neolithic
Visual art	Chinese painting	Ming dynasty painting	Ming dynasty
Visual art	Chinese painting	Tang dynasty painting	Tang dynasty
Visual art	Chinese painting	Ink and wash painting	Tang dynasty
Visual art	Chinese painting	Shan Shui painting	Song dynasty
Visual art	Photography		19th century
Visual art	Chinese calligraphy	Oracle bone script	Shang dynasty
Visual art	Chinese calligraphy	Cursive script	Han dynasty
Visual art	Chinese calligraphy	Drawing Daoist Talismans	Tang dynasty
Visual art	Comics	Lianhuanhua	1880s
Visual art	Comics	Manhua	1880s, termed in 1920s
Film	Cinema of China		1890s
Film	Chinese animation		1920s
Chinese music
Chinese music	Traditional	Instrumental	Zhou dynasty
Chinese music	Traditional	Yayue	Western Zhou dynasty
Chinese music	Modern	National music	1910s
Chinese music	Modern	C-pop	1920s
Chinese music	Modern	Chinese rock	1980s
Performing arts	Variety art	Chinese variety art	Han dynasty
Performing arts	Chinese opera	Peking opera	
Performing arts	Chinese opera	Kunqu	
Performing arts	Chinese opera	Cantonese opera	
Performing arts	Theatre	Xiangsheng	Ming dynasty
Performing arts	Shuochang narrative	Quyi	Dynastic times, termed in 1940s
Performing arts	Dances	Dragon dance	
Performing arts	Dances	Lion dance	
Architecture	Landscape architecture	Chinese architecture	
Gardening	Chinese Garden	Scholar's Garden	Zhou dynasty
Gardening	Bonsai	Penjing	

== Chinese Blue and White Porcelain ==
Chinese Blue and White has been a major auction type in Western fine arts auction events. Sotheby's and Christie's act as major platforms for art collectors to trade collections. As of 2016, Chinese Blue and White porcelain antiques are traded for millions of US Dollars through these platforms.

== Literature ==
=== Early Chinese poetry ===
In addition to the Book of Songs (Shi Jing), a second early and influential poetic anthology was the Songs of Chu (simplified Chinese: 楚辞; traditional Chinese: 楚辭; pinyin: Chǔ Cí), made up primarily of poems ascribed to the semilegendary Qu Yuan (c. 340–278 BC) and his follower Song Yu (fourth century BC). The songs in this collection are more lyrical and romantic and represent a different tradition from the earlier Classic of Poetry (Shi Jing). Many of the works in the text are associated with Shamanism. There are also descriptions of fantastic landscapes, examples of China's first nature poetry. The longest poem, "Encountering Sorrow," is reputed to have been written by the tragic Qu Yuan as a political allegory.

=== Han and Northern dynasties poetry ===
During, the Han dynasty, Chu lyrics evolved into the fu (賦), a poem usually in rhymed verse except for introductory and concluding passages that are in prose, often in the form of questions and answers. From the Han dynasty onwards, a process similar to the origins of the Shi Jing produced the yuefu poems.

In the Northern Dynasties historical records indicate Cao Cao was a brilliant ruler and poet. Cao Cao was also the father of the well-known poets Cao Pi and Cao Zhi. Cao Pi is known for writing the first Chinese poem using seven syllables per line (七言詩), the poem 燕歌行.

Cao Zhi demonstrated his spontaneous wit at an early age and was a front-running candidate for the throne; however, such ability was devoted to Chinese literature and poetry, which was encouraged by his father's subordinate officials. Later he surrounded himself with a group of poets and officials with literary interests, including some who continually showed off their smartness at the expense of Cao Cao and Cao Pi's subordinates and even Cao Cao himself.

Tao Qian's poetry influenced the work of many subsequent poets. Approximately 120 of his poems survive, which depict an idyllic pastoral life of farming and drinking.

=== Golden age of Chinese poetry ===
Yuefu are Chinese poems composed in a folk song style. The term literally means "Music Bureau", a reference to the government organization originally charged with collecting or writing the lyrics.

The lines are of uneven length, though five characters is the most common. Each poem follows one of a series of patterns defined by the song title. The term covers original folk songs, court imitations and versions by known poets.

From the 2nd century AD, the yuefu began to develop into shi—the form which was to dominate Chinese poetry until the modern era. The writers of these poems took the five-character line of the yuefu and used it to express more complex ideas. The shi poem was generally an expression of the poet's own persona rather than the adopted characters of the yuefu; many were romantic nature poems heavily influenced by Taoism.

The term gushi ("old poems") can refer either to the first, mostly anonymous shi poems, or more generally to the poems written in the same form by later poets. Gushi in this latter sense are defined essentially by what they are not; that is, they are not jintishi (regulated verse). The writer of gushi was under no formal constraints other than line length and rhyme (in every second line).

Jintishi, or regulated verse, developed from the 5th century onwards. By the Tang dynasty, a series of set tonal patterns had been developed, which were intended to ensure a balance between the four tones of classical Chinese in each couplet: the level tone, and the three deflected tones (rising, falling and entering). The Tang dynasty was the high point of the jintishi.

Notable poets from this era include Bai Juyi, Du Mu, Han Yu, Jia Dao, Li Qiao, Liu Zongyuan, Luo Binwang, Meng Haoran, Wang Wei, and Zhang Jiuling.

=== Li Bai and Du Fu ===
Li Bai and Du Fu both lived during the Tang dynasty. They are regarded by many as the greatest of the Chinese poets.

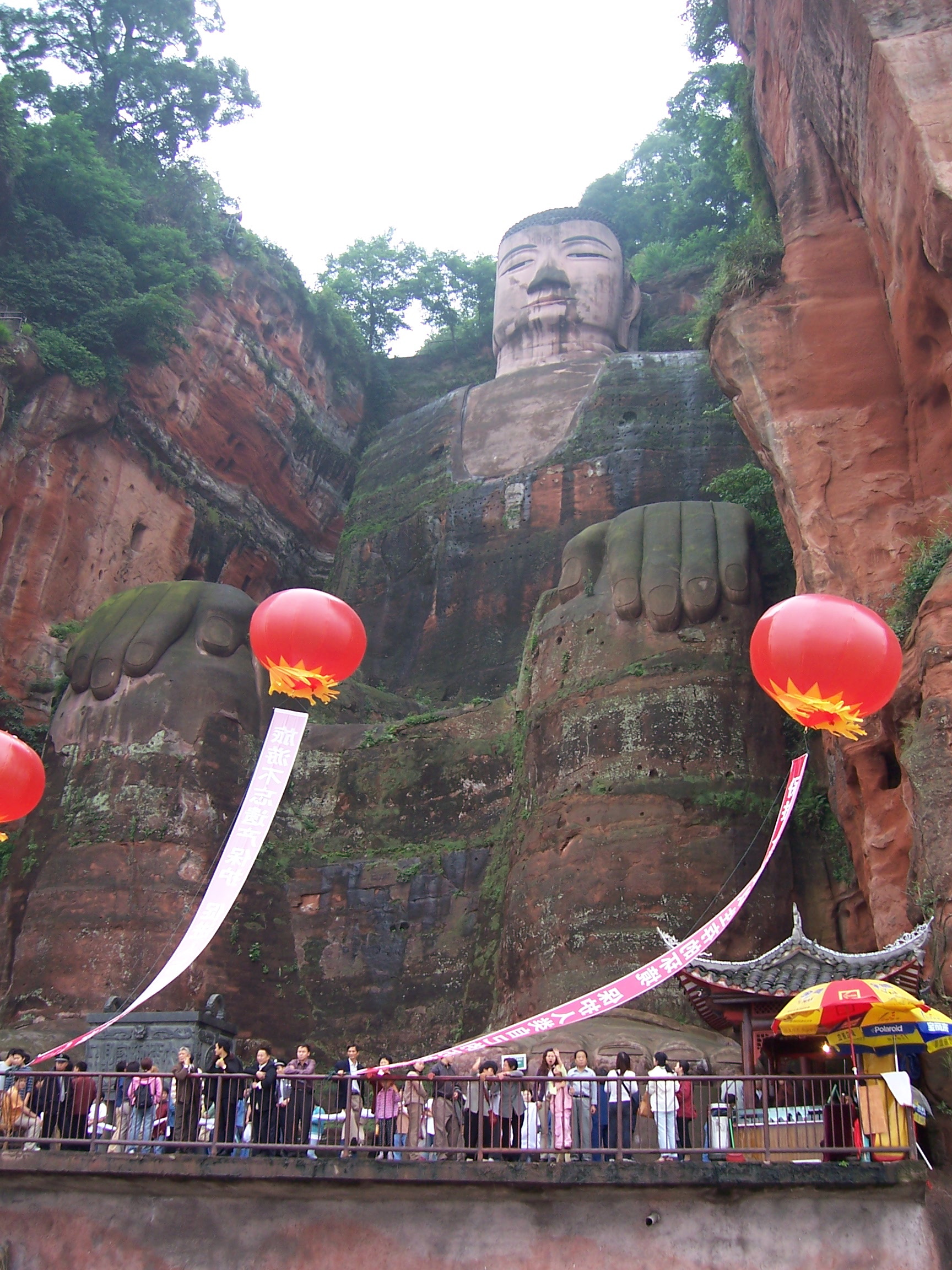
The Leshan Giant Buddha, 71 meters tall, construction began in 713 AD, completed ninety years later.

Over a thousand poems are attributed to Li Bai, but the authenticity of many of these is uncertain. He is best known for his yuefu poems, which are intense and often fantastic. He is often associated with Taoism: there is a strong element of this in his works, both in the sentiments they express and in their spontaneous tone. Nevertheless, his gufeng ("ancient airs") often adopt the perspective of the Confucian moralist, and many of his occasional verses are fairly conventional.

Much like Mozart, many legends exist on how Li Bai effortlessly composed his poetry, even (or some say, especially) when drunk; his favorite form is the jueju (five- or seven-character quatrain), of which he composed some 160 pieces. Using striking, unconventional imagery, Li Bai is able to create exquisite pieces to utilize fully the elements of the language. His use of language is not as erudite as Du Fu's but equally effective, impressing through an extravagance of imagination and a direct connection of a free-spirited persona with the reader. Li Bai's interactions with nature, friendship, and his acute observations of life inform his best poems. Some of the rest, like Changgan xing (translated by Ezra Pound as A River Merchant's Wife: A Letter), records the hardships or emotions of common people. Like the best Chinese poets, Li Bai often evades translation.

Since the Song dynasty, critics have called Du Fu the "poet historian". The most directly historical of his poems are those commenting on military tactics or the successes and failures of the government, or the poems of advice which he wrote to the emperor.

One of the Du Fu's earliest surviving works, The Song of the Wagons (c. 750), gives voice to the sufferings of a conscript soldier in the imperial army, even before the beginning of the rebellion; this poem brings out the tension between the need of acceptance and fulfillment of one's duties, and a clear-sighted consciousness of the suffering which this can involve.

Du Fu's work is notable above all for its range. He mastered all the forms of Chinese poetry: Chou says that in every form he "either made outstanding advances or contributed outstanding examples" (p. 56). Furthermore, his poems use a wide range of registers, from the direct and colloquial to the allusive and self-consciously literary. The tenor of his work changed as he developed his style and adapted to his surroundings ("chameleonlike" according to Watson): his earliest works are in a relatively derivative, courtly style, but he came into his own in the years of the rebellion. Owen comments on the "grim simplicity" of the Qinzhou poems, which mirrors the desert landscape (p. 425); the works from his Chengdu period are "light, often finely observed" (p. 427); while the poems from the late Kuizhou period have a "density and power of vision" (p. 433).

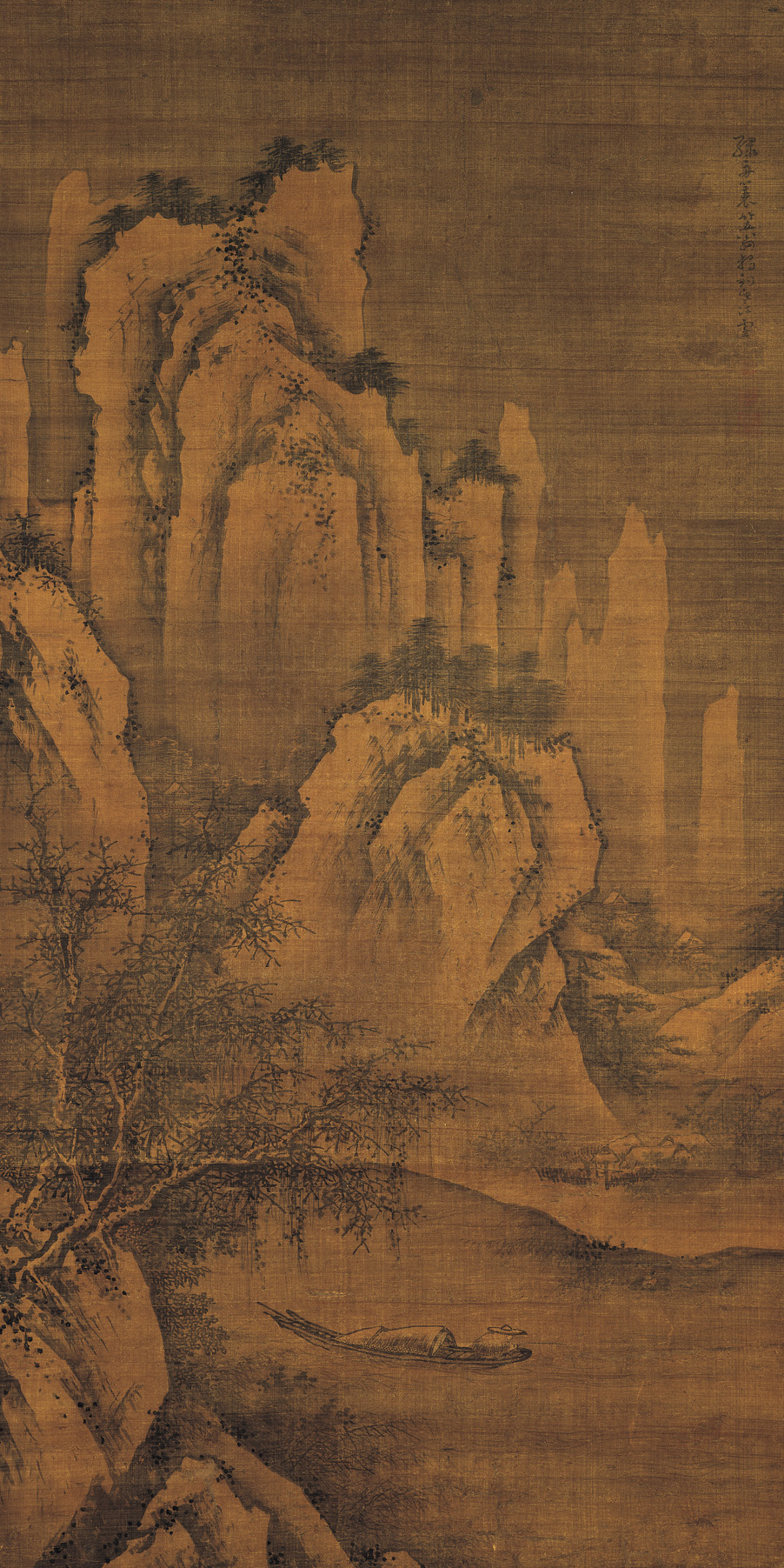
Landscape by Zhou Wenjing, featuring part of Liu Zongyuan's poem "Winter Snow" in the upper right corner ("孤舟蓑笠翁，獨釣寒江雪")

=== Late Tang and Five Dynasties poetry ===
Li Shangyin was a Chinese poet of the late Tang dynasty. He was a typical Late Tang poet: his works are sensuous, dense and allusive. The latter quality makes adequate translation extremely difficult. Many of his poems have political, romantic or philosophical implications, but it is often unclear which of these should be read into each work.

Li Yu was a Chinese poet and the last ruler of the Southern Tang Kingdom. His best-known poems were composed during the years after the Song formally ended his reign in 975 and brought him back as a captive to the Song capital, Bianjing (now Kaifeng). Li's works from this period dwell on his regret for the lost kingdom and the pleasures it had brought him. He was finally poisoned by the Song emperor in 978.

Li Yu developed the ci by broadening its scope from love to history and philosophy, particularly in his later works. He also introduced the two-stanza form, and made great use of contrasts between longer lines of nine characters and shorter ones of three and five.

=== Song poetry ===
Ci is a kind of lyric Chinese poetry. Beginning in the Liang dynasty, the ci followed the tradition of the Shi Jing and the yuefu: they were lyrics which developed from anonymous popular songs (some of Central Asian origin) into a sophisticated literary genre. The form was further developed in the Tang dynasty, and was most popular in the Song dynasty. Ci most often expressed feelings of desire, often in an adopted persona, but the greatest exponents of the form (such as Li Houzhu and Su Shi) used it to address a wide range of topics. Well-known poets of the Song dynasty include Zeng Gong, Li Qingzhao, Lu You, Mei Yaochen, Ouyang Xiu, Su Dongpo, Wang Anshi, and Xin Qiji.

=== Ming literature ===
The Ming dynasty author Gao Qi is acknowledged as a great practitioner of poetry during the Ming dynasty. His poems are departure of those of earlier dynasties and formed a new style of poetry in the Ming dynasty. Zhang Dai is acknowledged as the greatest essayist of the Ming dynasty. Wen Zhenheng, the great-grandson of Wen Zhengming, wrote a classic on garden architecture and interior design, Zhang Wu Zhi (On Superfluous Things).

=== Qing literature ===
Yuan Mei was a well-known poet who lived during the Qing dynasty. In the decades before his death, Yuan Mei produced a large body of poetry, essays and paintings. His works reflected his interest in Chan Buddhism and the supernatural, at the expense of Taoism and institutional Buddhism—both of which he rejected. Yuan is most famous for his poetry, which has been described as "unusually clear and elegant language". His views on poetry as expressed in the Suiyuan shihua (隨園詩話) stressed the importance of personal feeling and technical perfection.

Many great works of art and literature originated during the period, and the Qianlong emperor in particular undertook huge projects to preserve important cultural texts. The novel form became widely read and perhaps China's most famous novel, Dream of the Red Chamber, was written in the mid-eighteenth century.

Cao Xueqin is the author of the famous Chinese work Dream of the Red Chamber. Extant handwritten copies of this work—some 80 chapters—had been in circulation in Beijing shortly after Cao's death, before Gao Ê, who claimed to have access to the former's working papers, published a complete 120-chapter version in 1792. Pu Songling was a famous writer of Liaozhai Zhiyi 《聊齋志異》during the Qing dynasty. He opened a tea house and invited his guests to tell stories, and then he would compile the tales into collections such as Strange Stories from a Chinese Studio.

=== Western influence: the Big Three ===
In the early 20th century Shanghai became the birthplace and entertainment hub of the three new major art forms, Chinese cinema, Chinese animation and Chinese popular music. These entertainment were heavily inspired by western technology. For the first time, local citizens adopted and molded western culture to fit into Chinese culture in a positive way without any imperial court intervention.

The most popular form of comics Lianhuanhua which circulated as palm sized books in Shanghai, Guangzhou, Wuhan and Northern China. It became one of the most affordable form of entertainment art. The famous Sanmao character would also be born at this time.

Chinese popular music musicians like Zhou Xuan and Li Jinhui were immediately endangered under the new regime as it labeled the genre yellow music (pornography). On the contrary, revolutionary music was promoted and brought to new heights like never before. The film and animation industry would make their last run until the Cultural revolution, which would hinder any progress with serious restrictions and unreasonable censorship. A large number of Shanghai citizens, including artists, immigrated to Hong Kong. It would fuel the birth of modern Chinese art in the British colony that has until now, been largely dominated by British entertainment. The pop music industry would rebound in Taiwan and Hong Kong. The animation race would be lost to Japan.

=== Modern poetry ===
Modern Chinese poems (新詩 vers libre) usually do not follow any prescribed pattern. Bei Dao is the most notable representative of the Misty Poets, a group of Chinese poets who reacted against the restrictions of the Cultural Revolution. The work of the Misty Poets and Bei Dao in particular were an inspiration to pro-democracy movements in China. Most notable was his poem "Huida" ("The Answer"), which was written during the 1976 Tiananmen demonstrations in which he participated. The poem was taken up as a defiant anthem of the pro-democracy movement and appeared on posters during the Tiananmen Square protests of 1989.

Xu Zhimo is a romantic poet who loved the poetry of the English Romantics like Keats and Shelley. He was one of the first Chinese writers to successfully naturalize Western romantic forms into modern Chinese poetry.

== Music ==
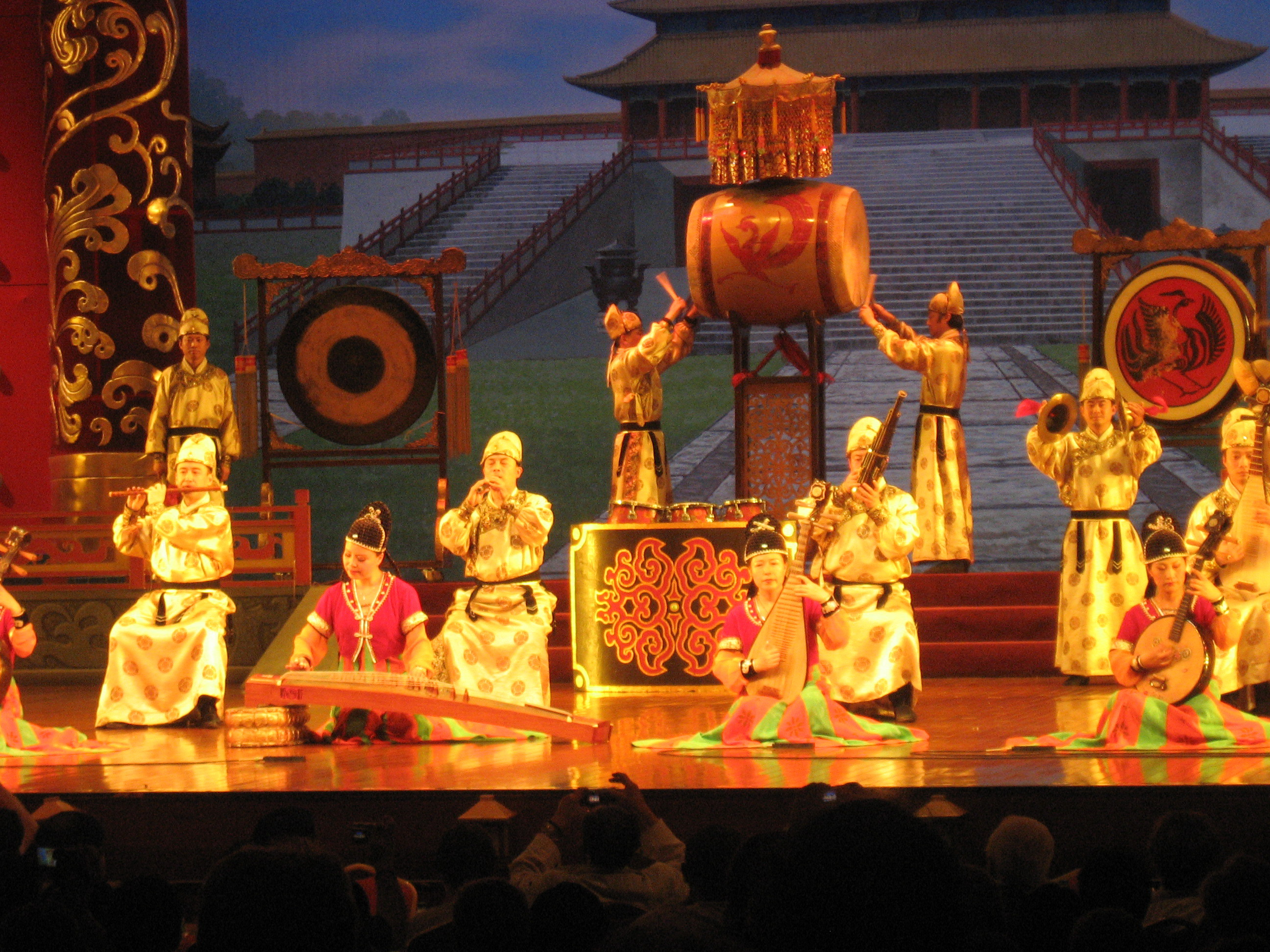
Traditional style Chinese concert performance in China

=== Early Chinese music ===
The origins of Chinese music and poetry can be found in the Book of Songs, containing poems composed between 1000 BC and 600 BC. The text, preserved among the canon of early Chinese literature, contains folk songs, hymns and stately songs. Originally intended to be sung, the accompanying music unfortunately has since been lost. They had a wide range of purposes, including for courtship, ceremonial greetings, warfare, feasting and lamentation. The love poems are among the most appealing in the freshness and innocence of their language.

Early Chinese music was based on percussion instruments such as the bronze bell. Chinese bells were sounded by being struck from the outside, usually with a piece of wood. Sets of bells were suspended on wooden racks. Inside excavated bells are groves and marks of scraping and scratching made as they were tuned to the right pitch. Percussion instruments gradually gave way to string and reed instruments toward the Warring States period.

Significantly, the character for writing the word music (yue) was the same as that for joy (le). For Confucius and his disciples, music was important because it had the power to make people harmonious and well balanced, or, conversely, caused them to be quarrelsome and depraved. According to Xun Zi, music was as important as the li ("rites"; "etiquette") stressed in Confucianism. Mozi, philosophically opposed to Confucianism, disagreed. He dismissed music as having only aesthetic uses, and thus useless and wasteful.

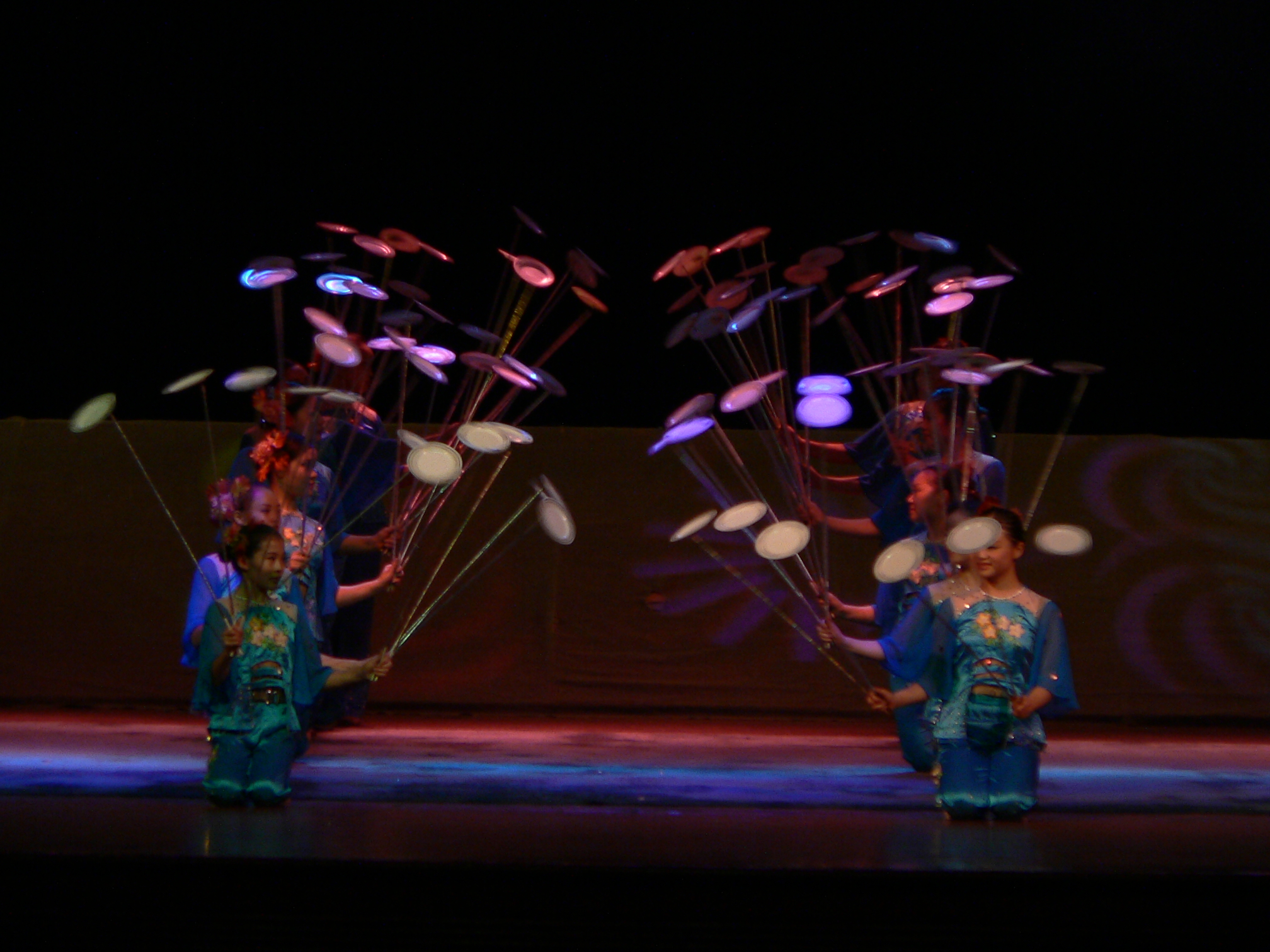
Chinese variety art, also known in the west as "Chinese circus"

== Performing art ==
=== Yuan drama ===
Chinese opera is a popular form of drama in China. In general, it dates back to the Tang dynasty with Emperor Xuanzong (712–755), who founded the "Pear Garden" (梨园), the first known opera troupe in China. The troupe mostly performed for the emperors' personal pleasure. To this day operatic professionals are still referred to as "Disciples of the Pear Garden" (梨园子弟). In the Yuan dynasty (1279–1368), forms like the Zaju (杂剧, variety plays), which acts based on rhyming schemes plus the innovation of having specialized roles like "Dan" (旦, female), "Sheng" (生, male) and "Chou" (丑, Clown), were introduced into the opera.

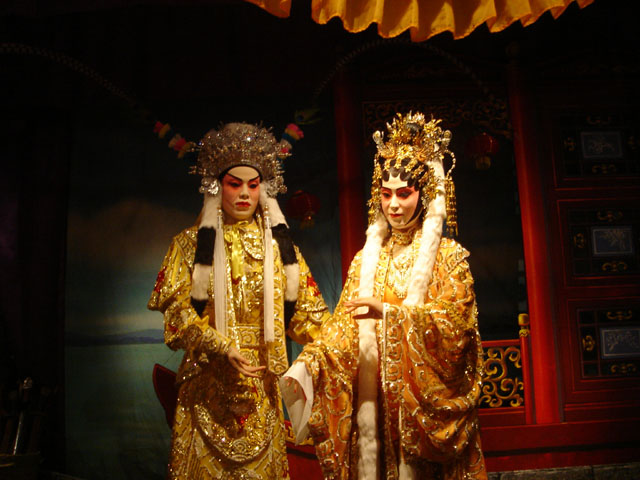
Modern performers of Cantonese opera in Hong Kong

Cantonese opera, which originated from the north and developed over time since, contains many well-known programs such as The Purple Hairpin and Rejuvenation of the Red Plum Flower, originated from the Yuan dynasty.

=== Peking opera ===
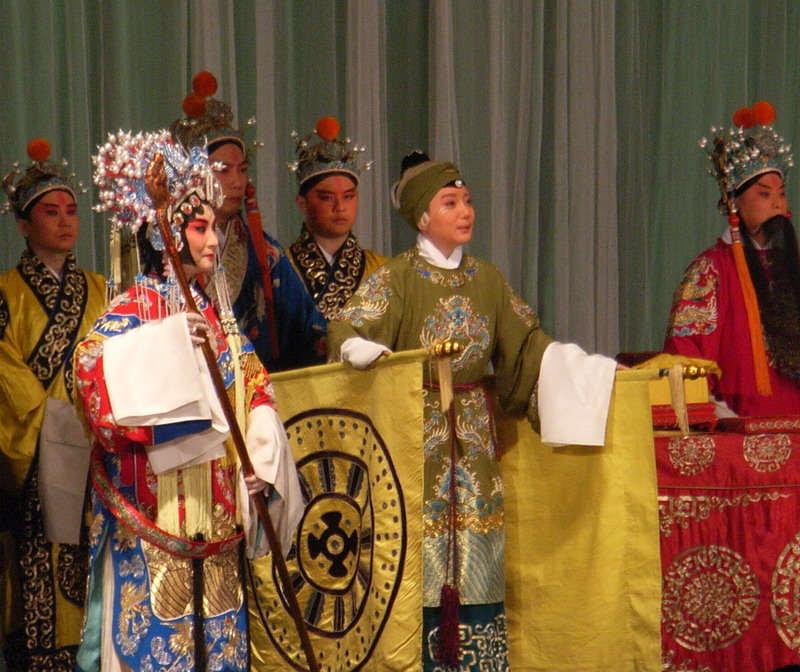
Peking opera scene.

The best-known form of Chinese opera is Beijing or Peking opera, which assumed its present form in the mid-19th century and was extremely popular in the Qing dynasty (1644–1911). In Beijing Opera, traditional Chinese string and percussion instruments provide a strong rhythmic accompaniment to the acting. The acting is based on allusion: gestures, footwork, and other body movements express such actions as riding a horse, rowing a boat, or opening a door.

Although it is called Beijing opera, its origins are not in Beijing but in the Chinese provinces of Anhui and Hubei. Beijing opera got its two main melodies, Xipi and Erhuang, from Anhui and Hubei operas. Much dialogue is also carried out in an archaic dialect originating partially from those regions. It also absorbed music and arias from other operas and musical arts such as the historic Qinqiang. It is regarded that Beijing Opera was born when the Four Great Anhui Troupes came to Beijing in 1790. Beijing opera was originally staged for the court and came into the public later. In 1828, some famous Hubei troupes came to Beijing. They often jointly performed in the stage with Anhui troupes. The combination gradually formed Beijing opera's main melodies.

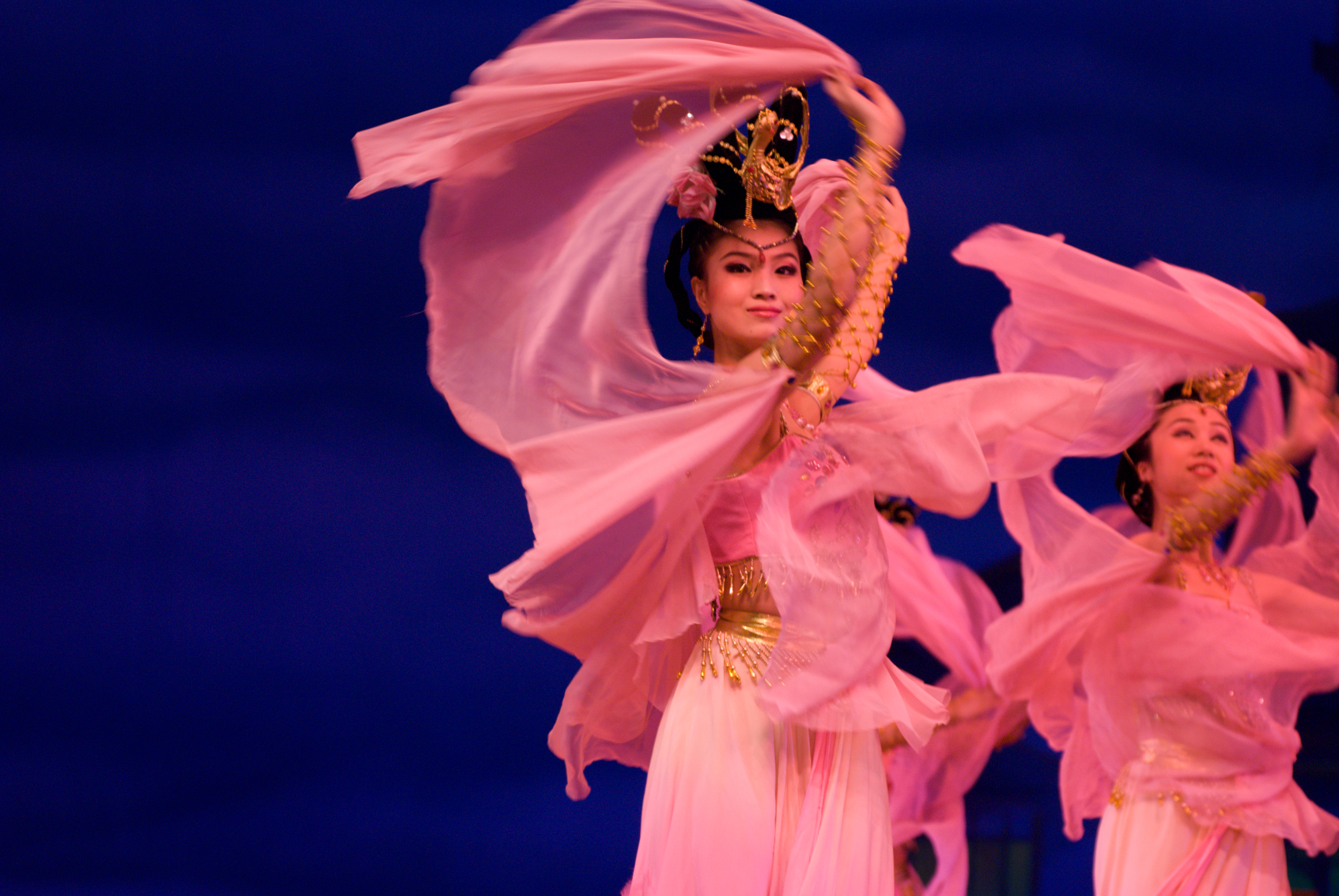
Chinese dance

=== Dance ===
In ancient China. Chinese dance was divided into two types, civilian and military. In the Shang and Zhou period, civilian dance, dancers held feather banners in their hands, symbolizing the distribution of the fruits of the day's hunting or fishing. Military dance involved brandishing of weapons, for example it was recorded that the Han founding Emperor Liu Bang was fond of the war dance of the Ba people, and large scale performances of the dance involved the brandishing of various weapons to the accompaniment of drums and songs in the Ba language.

The best known Chinese dances are the Dragon dance and the Lion dance.

== Visual arts ==
=== Contemporary art ===
New forms of Chinese art were heavily influenced by the New Culture Movement, which adopted Western techniques and employed socialist realism.

Socialist realism was introduce into Chinese oil painting through a class held by Konstantin Maksimov in Beijing. Feng Fasi's The Heroic Death of Liu Hulan is regarded as a classic socialist realist painting.

The Cultural Revolution shaped Chinese art in the 20th century like no other event in history with the Four Olds destruction campaign. Aesthetic principles emphasized during the Cultural Revolution included the "three prominences," "tall, big, complete," and "red, bright, shining".

Contemporary Chinese artists continue to produce a wide range of experimental works, multimedia installations, and performance "happenings" which have become very popular in the international art market.

=== Chinese paintings ===
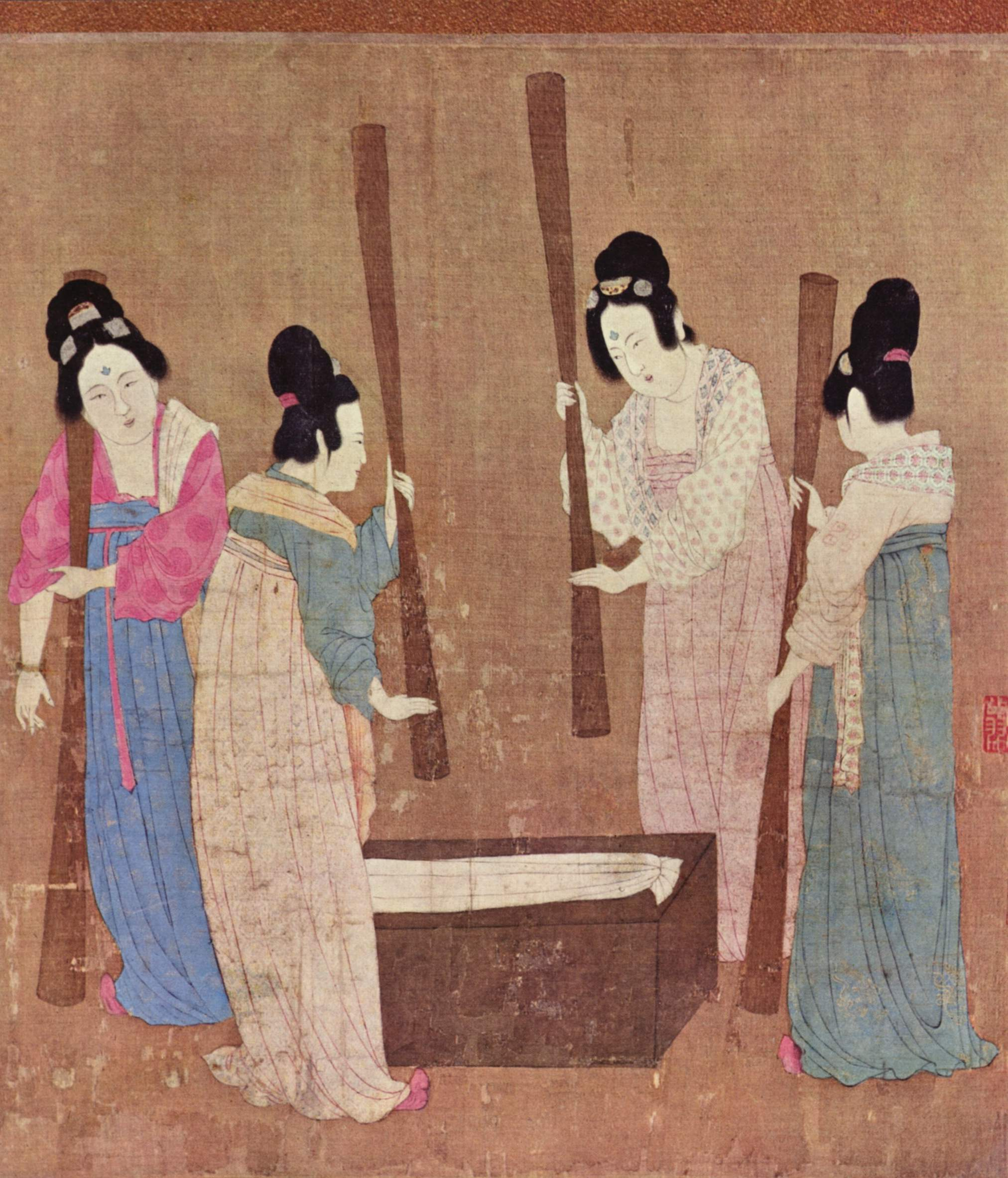
Women striking and preparing silk, Song dynasty copy by Emperor Huizong of an earlier Tang dynasty painting by Zhang Xuan.

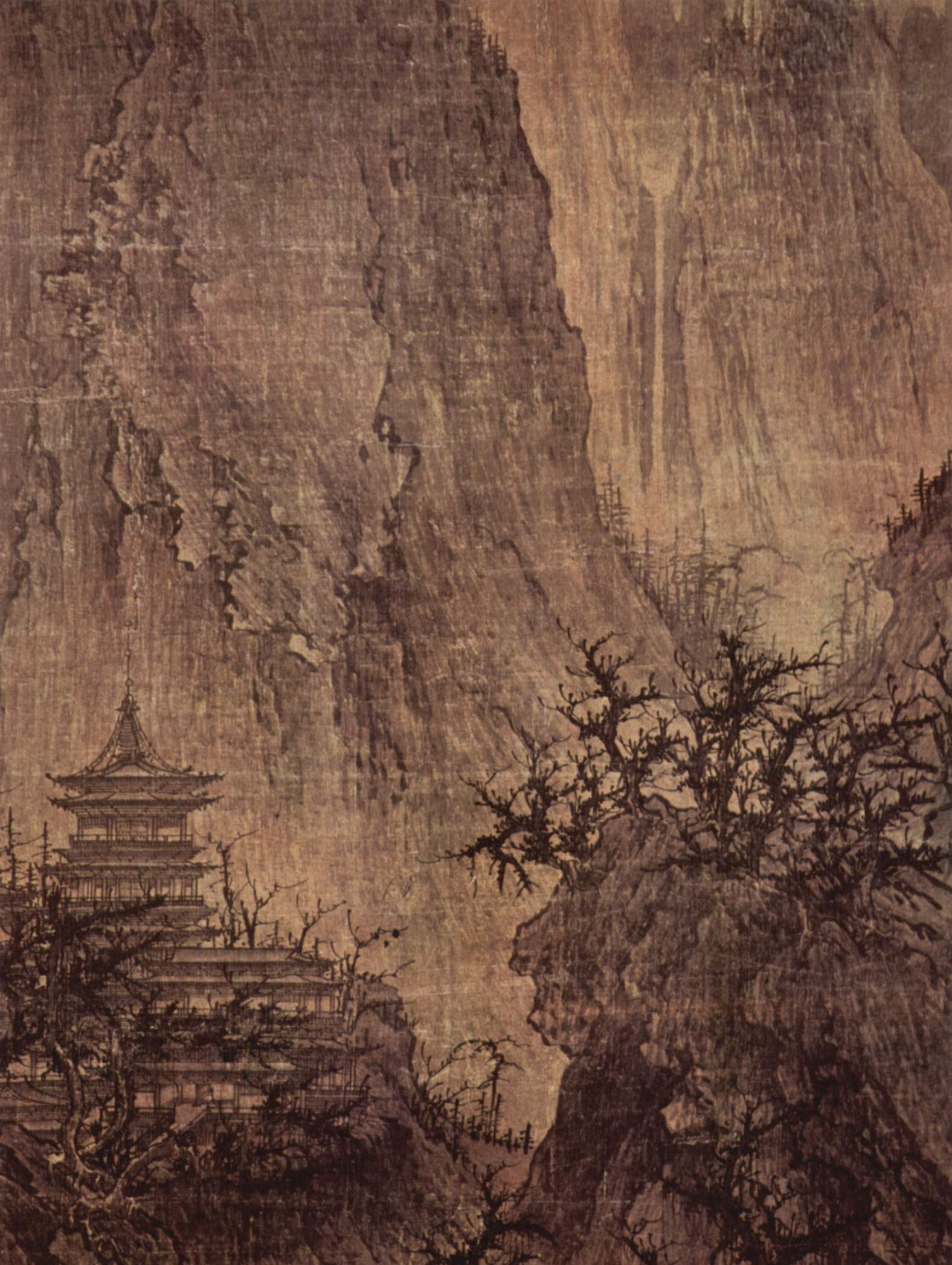
Buddhist Temple in the Mountains, 11th century, ink on silk, Nelson-Atkins Museum of Art, Kansas City (Missouri).

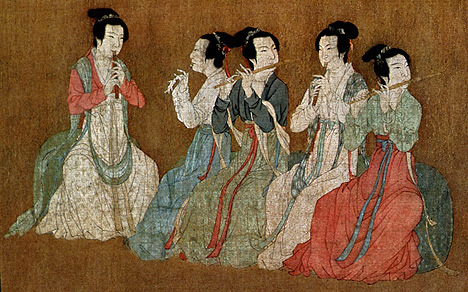
Details from "Night Revels of Han Xizai" by Gu Hongzhong

"Pigeon on a peach branch"; by Emperor Huizong of Song, Northern Song dynasty, 1108 or 1109 CE

Drunken Celestrial by Liang Kai

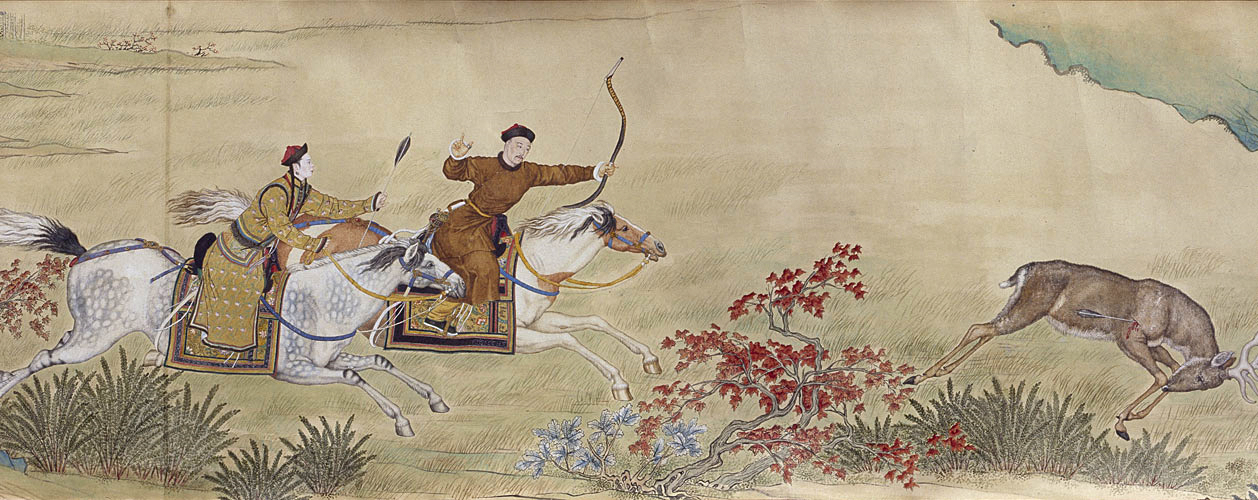
Imperial Hunting painted by Giuseppe Castiglione (1688–1766), Emperors' imperial palace Italian painter in Qing dynasty China.

== Folk art ==
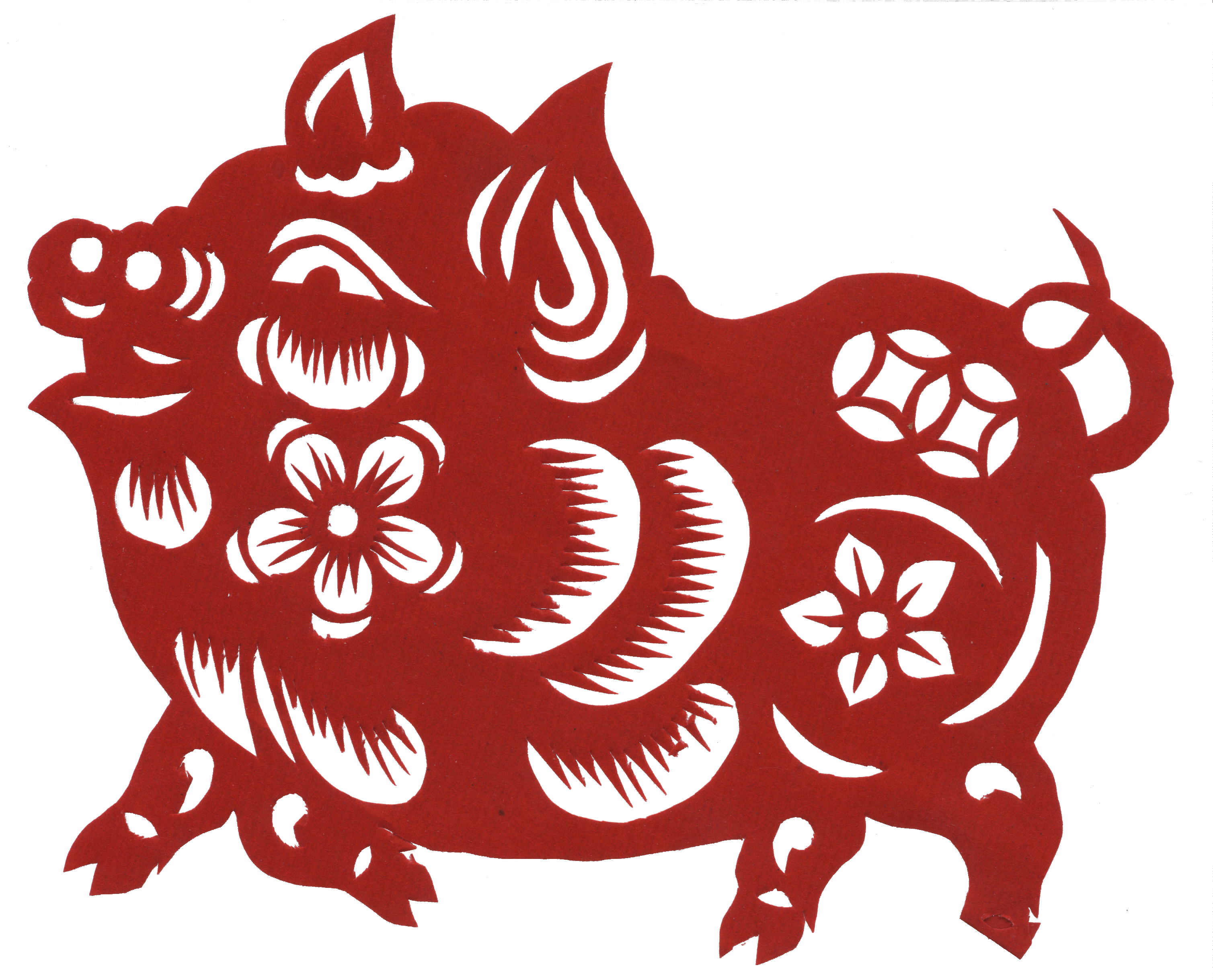
Paper cut of pig celebrating Pig Year New Year

=== Han Paper art ===
The most notable invention of the Han period was paper which spawned two new types of arts. Chinese Paper Cutting became a new concept. The idea of expressing symbols and Chinese characters already a part of calligraphy was now extended to Han paper cut outs. Another art form was the Chinese paper folding. While it has its roots in the Han dynasty, later renditions would transform the art into origami, after Buddhist monks took paper to Japan.

== See also ==
- Timeline of Chinese music
- History of Chinese Animations
- Classical Chinese poetry
- Culture of China
- Culture of Hong Kong
- Longmen Grottoes
