= Zhang Dai =

Chinese essayist and historian (1597–1684)

- 張岱
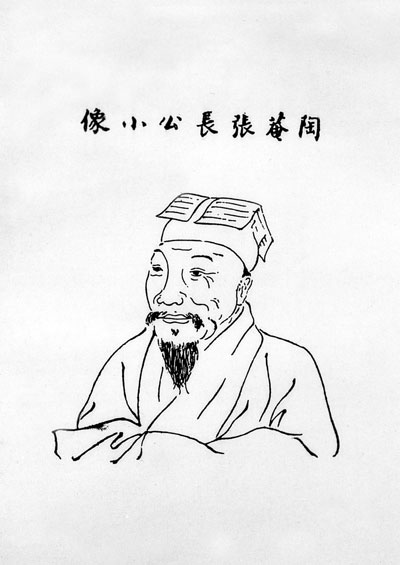
- Portrait of Zhang Dai
- Born: 5 October 1597; Shanyin County, Shaoxing, Zhejiang, Ming dynasty
- Died: 1684 (aged 86–87); Shaoxing, Zhejiang, Qing dynasty
- Other names: Courtesy names: Zongzi (宗子), Shigong (石公); Pseudonyms: Tao'an (陶庵), Die'an Jushi (蝶庵居士)
- Occupations: Essayist, historian, memoirist
- Known for: Tao'an mengyi Xihu mengxun Shigui shu
- Spouse: Lady Liu
- Children: 6 sons, 10 daughters
- Relatives: Zhang Tianfu (great-great-grandfather); Zhang Yuanbian (great-grandfather); Zhang Rulin (grandfather); Zhang Yaofang (father); Zhang Shanmin (younger brother)

Zhang Dai (Chinese: 張岱; pinyin: Zhāng Dài; 5 October 1597 – 1684), courtesy names Zongzi and Shigong, pseudonyms Tao'an and Die'an Jushi, was a Chinese essayist, historian, memoirist, and connoisseur active during the late Ming dynasty and early Qing dynasty. A native of Shanyin County in Shaoxing, Zhejiang, he was born into a distinguished scholarly family that had produced three consecutive generations of jinshi degree-holders. Enjoying considerable wealth and cultural privilege in his youth, Zhang cultivated refined tastes in theatre, tea, antiquities, travel, food, music, and urban leisure, although he repeatedly failed the provincial imperial examinations.

Following the collapse of the Ming in 1644, Zhang briefly served in the Southern Ming court of Zhu Yihai, Prince of Lu, before fleeing warfare and retreating into mountain seclusion. Living in severe poverty as a Ming loyalist, he devoted much of his remaining life to writing. His best-known prose collections, especially Tao'an mengyi and Xihu mengxun, nostalgically reconstruct the social and cultural world of late Ming Jiangnan. His essays, characterised by elegant concision, vivid characterisation, irony, and elegiac memory, circulated widely in the early Qing and have since been regarded as exemplary works of the xiaopin familiar-essay tradition. As a historian, Zhang compiled the monumental Shigui shu and its sequel, works that sought to record the history of the Ming dynasty and analyse the causes of its fall. Religiously, he participated in Buddhist rituals, temple culture, and popular devotional practices, but was not a doctrinally rigorous Buddhist.

== Family background ==
Zhang Dai came from a prominent literati lineage that had held official positions since the Jiajing reign (1522–1566). His great-great-grandfather, Zhang Tianfu, obtained the jinshi degree in 1547. While serving in Yunnan, Zhang Tianfu was falsely accused by political rivals. Although he eventually escaped from the crisis, the ordeal severely damaged his health and effectively ruined his official career.

Zhang's great-grandfather, Zhang Yuanbian, ranked first in the 1571 palace examination and became that year's zhuangyuan. He later served as a lecturer to the crown prince at the imperial court. Known for his austere and uncompromising temperament, he refused to cultivate courtly patrons or flatter influential men in the capital, and was eventually forced to resign and return to Shaoxing. He was a strict father, a prolific writer, and an intellectual supporter of the Taizhou school of Wang Yangming's philosophy.

Zhang's grandfather, Zhang Rulin, passed the jinshi examination in 1595 and rose to the rank of counsellor in the Jiangxi Provincial Administration Commission. While serving as a county magistrate in Jiangxi, he petitioned against newly imposed mining taxes and helped quell unrest caused by excessive levies on medicinal herbs. Zhang's father, Zhang Yaofang, repeatedly failed the examinations, finally securing a place on the supplementary list of the provincial examination at the age of 53. Between 1627 and 1631, he served as chief clerk in the household of Zhu Shouyong, Prince of Lu, in Yanzhou Prefecture, Shandong.

From Zhang Rulin's generation onwards, the family's lifestyle became increasingly extravagant. Zhang Yaofang and his brothers built elaborate residences, maintained private theatrical troupes, collected antiquities, and indulged in wine, music, and sensual pleasures. Zhang Yaofang's personal hobbies became increasingly expensive. Nevertheless, the Zhang family possessed a substantial private library accumulated over three generations, comprising more than 30,000 volumes, which gave Zhang Dai unusually favourable conditions for reading and study. Zhang had three younger brothers. One of them, Zhang Shanmin, was known as a scholar, poet, and art connoisseur.

== Life ==
=== Under the Ming ===
Zhang Dai suffered from poor health in childhood, including pleural effusion, but showed precocious intellectual ability. He loved reading from an early age, read widely across many fields, and was particularly skilled at composing couplets. As the eldest grandson of the principal branch of the family, he was personally taught and cherished by his grandfather Zhang Rulin, and enjoyed a privileged household position that freed him from the need to worry about livelihood. His youth was spent largely in study, leisure, and refined entertainments.

Zhang frequently accompanied his grandfather to the family retreat known as the "Kuai Garden", located at the northern foot of Longshan, northwest of Shaoxing city. Zhang Rulin once took him to meet the eminent scholar Huang Ruheng, hoping that Zhang Dai might become Huang's disciple, but the arrangement did not materialise. Despite his evident learning, Zhang never succeeded in the provincial examinations. His repeated failures caused him considerable frustration, though he was consoled by his younger brother and by his close friend Qi Biaojia.

In 1629, Zhang travelled to Yanzhou Prefecture in Shandong to celebrate his father's birthday, and took the opportunity to visit Mount Tai. In 1631, he made a second journey north to visit his father.

=== Ming–Qing transition and later life ===
The fall of the Ming dynasty in 1644, when Zhang was 48, abruptly ended his life of comfort. In 1645, after Qing forces captured Nanjing, the Ming minister Ma Shiying fled with remnant troops to join Zhu Yihai, Prince of Lu. Writing under the pseudonym "Commoner of the Eastern Sea", Zhang submitted a memorial condemning Ma's treachery and urging the Prince of Lu to arrest and execute him. The Prince summoned Zhang to Taizhou and authorised him to carry out the sentence. Zhang led troops in pursuit of Ma, but Ma escaped. In September, the Prince moved his court from Taizhou to Shaoxing, and Zhang received him at his family residence.

When the Prince of Lu later assumed the title of Regent, Zhang accepted a minor appointment as secretary in the Ministry of War's Bureau of Operations. The office was low-ranking, and Zhang soon became uneasy about the court's prospects. Seeing that the Prince of Lu's regime was unlikely to accomplish the restoration of the Ming, he resigned and withdrew. According to another account, Ma Shiying allied with the general Fang Guo'an to control the Prince of Lu and expel Zhang.

In January 1646, Fang Guo'an forcibly summoned Zhang to discuss military affairs. Zhang, although ill, came out of retirement, but soon encountered harassment by soldiers demanding taxes, and one of his sons was briefly abducted. Zhang fled; his home was looted by Fang's troops, and his treasured family library was lost. That summer, as Qing forces took Shaoxing, Zhang placed his sons and two wives in a safer refuge in the mountains east of the city, while he himself escaped into the deep hills southwest of Shaoxing.

Zhang was profoundly affected by the collapse of the Ming and resolved to live as a Ming remnant scholar. He took refuge in a mountain temple with only one son and one servant, living under an assumed name while compiling a history of the fallen dynasty. His conditions were extremely harsh. He often lacked firewood and rice and endured hunger. He contemplated suicide, but decided to remain alive in order to complete his historical writings.

In 1649, Zhang returned to Shaoxing and purchased land near the ruined site of the former Kuai Garden on Longshan. The place was already desolate. He personally repaired collapsed walls and dilapidated buildings, brought his family back together, and lived a frugal life of simple food and reduced circumstances. In 1653, he visited Jiangxi to see his kinsman Zhang Dengzi and toured former battlefields of anti-Qing resistance. In 1654, he travelled to Hangzhou and was deeply moved by the transformed and war-damaged landscape. In 1657, at the invitation of Gu Yingtai, the Zhejiang Provincial Education Commissioner, Zhang went to Hangzhou to assist in compiling the Ming Shi Jishi Benmo. The work was largely completed early the following year, after which Zhang returned to Shaoxing.

Around 1665, Zhang prepared his own tomb and composed his own epitaph. He died in 1684, traditionally counted as being in his eighty-eighth year.

=== Family life ===
In 1616, Zhang married Lady Liu, whose family was also scholarly and of moderate means. Zhang had at least two concubines, who continued to live with him after Lady Liu's death. He had ten daughters and six sons. In old age, Zhang still had to bear the burden of supporting a large household. His eldest and second sons were somewhat indolent, though they remained men of letters. In 1654, they went to Hangzhou to sit the provincial examination; Zhang did not prevent them, but neither passed.

== Literary works ==
=== Prose ===
Zhang Dai is widely regarded as a master of late Ming prose, especially of the xiaopin familiar essay. His writings were widely read and imitated in the early Qing, remaining popular for decades. His short prose is fluid, approachable, elegant, and economical. It records almost everything that attracted his attention, while remaining vivid and highly readable. His historical prose, by contrast, tends to be concise and restrained.

Zhang was particularly skilled at depicting people. Within a limited space, he used details of ordinary life, concise but forceful language, distinctive syntax, and a mixture of seriousness and humour to reveal a person's social position and individual character. His character sketches show the influence of the Records of the Grand Historian and A New Account of the Tales of the World. He was able to capture both physical appearance and inner temperament in a few vivid strokes. In his essay on the storyteller Liu Jingting, for instance, he describes Liu as dark-complexioned, scarred, absent-minded, and almost wooden in bearing, thereby conveying the performer's strange and memorable presence. His portraits of the jinshi Fan Changbai and the actor Peng Tianxi similarly convey distinctive expressions and personalities.

Zhang also wrote memorably about women of the entertainment world. He depicted the actress Zhu Chusheng as deeply emotional, troubled in mind, and ultimately destroyed by feeling. He also sketched the courtesan Wang Yuesheng as proud and aloof, yet trapped in the world of pleasure quarters, obliged to deal with vulgar patrons despite her reluctance.

Zhang's principal prose works include Tao'an mengyi in eight volumes, Langhuan wenji in six volumes, and Xihu mengxun in five volumes. Tao'an mengyi, completed around 1646, describes Zhang's earlier life and the social customs of the late Ming. Strongly autobiographical, it recalls the refined pleasures of his youth: gardens, theatre, fireworks, courtesans, tea, artisans, curiosities, and unusual entertainments.

Tao'an mengyi contains 123 short pieces, which may be broadly divided into four groups. The first consists of travel accounts, such as "Moonlight on Lu Peak", which describes a nocturnal ascent of the mountain to view the moon. Zhang and his friends climbed despite the danger of tigers and wild animals, alarming his family and causing mountain villagers to think that bandits had appeared. The second group concerns music, actors, and theatrical troupes, such as "The Zhang Family's Performers", which describes the private performers kept by Zhang's household and by his friends. The third group concerns antiquities and curios, as in "The Wooden Dragon", which records a family heirloom once owned by the Prince of Kaiping and later purchased by Zhang's father at great expense. The fourth group concerns food, such as "The Crab Society", which describes annual gatherings in the tenth lunar month at which Zhang and his friends feasted on river crabs. Other essays discuss tea, fireworks, flowers, birds, and horses.

Through recollections of the past, Zhang presents the distinctive elegance and tastes of late Ming literati life. In "Viewing Snow at the Lake Heart Pavilion", he describes going alone by small boat to the West Lake after three days of heavy snow, when "the sounds of men and birds had ceased". At the pavilion he unexpectedly encountered two men who had already spread out felt mats and were drinking wine. They were delighted to see him and drew him into their company. This solitary yet sociable appreciation of snow reveals the kind of refined sensibility that Zhang valued. His prose also expresses cultural and political loyalty to the Ming. In pieces such as "Mount Zhong", he conveys sorrow over the fall of the dynasty and an implicit attachment to the Ming order.

The contrast between Zhang's youthful luxury and his later destitution gives much of his writing its poignancy. After the Ming collapse, he regarded his suffering as karmic retribution for earlier extravagance and wrote that he recorded his former life in order to present it before the Buddha and confess each transgression. His nostalgia is therefore not simple indulgence, but is tempered by irony, regret, and self-examination. He observes, for example, that many visitors to West Lake during full moons were not truly interested in viewing the moon; only after the crowds departed could he and his companions appreciate the beauty of the night:

Those who had been sipping wine and singing softly emerged, as did those who had hidden beneath the trees. We exchanged greetings and invited them to sit. Refined friends arrived, celebrated courtesans appeared, cups and chopsticks were arranged, and music began. The moonlight grew pale, the east brightened, and only then did the guests depart.

Zhang also used irony to criticise the commodification of women. He describes the Yangzhou "thin horses" (Yangzhou "thin horses"): girls purchased from poor families, trained in manners and the arts, and later resold as concubines to wealthy households. His account of brokers displaying these women resembles the presentation of commercial goods; the transactions are hurried, vulgar, and cold, lacking any genuine romance. He also records hundreds of lower-class prostitutes waiting outside teahouses and wine shops in Yangzhou, forcing smiles while unable to conceal their misery. In several such passages, references to karmic retribution imply the moral darkness behind late Ming prosperity. Zhang also contrasts the former splendour of West Lake's incense markets with the devastating famine in Hangzhou in 1641–1642, when more than half the population is said to have died. The lavish customs of local tomb-sweeping and festival life are thus set against later ruin and desolation.

The preface to Xihu mengxun was completed in 1671. Zhang argued that the West Lake preserved in dream and memory was more real and moving than the ruined lake after war. The book records scenic sites and meeting places around West Lake, reconstructing the landscape of late Ming Hangzhou. Zhang also compiled Yehangchuan, an encyclopaedic miscellany of knowledge. Because travellers on night ferries in Jiangnan often conversed at length, one needed broad learning to participate in such conversations; Zhang wrote the book for that purpose. It contains roughly 300,000 characters, including a volume devoted to foreign customs.

=== Poetry and drama ===
Zhang stated that his early poetry was strongly influenced by Xu Wei, the Gong'an school, and the Jingling school. He especially admired Tao Yuanming. During the hardships of displacement, Tao's poetry became a source of consolation, and Zhang composed many poems matching or responding to Tao's works. Zhang agreed with the literary ideas of Gui Youguang, Yuan Hongdao, and others. Although he criticised the archaising Later Seven Masters, he did not dismiss all their literary achievements, and especially admired Wang Shizhen.

Zhang also wrote drama. After the fall of the eunuch dictator Wei Zhongxian, he composed a play titled Bingshan ("The Ice Mountain") on Wei's career and downfall. It was staged in Shaoxing and received enthusiastically. In 1631, Zhang brought a theatrical troupe to Shandong to perform Bingshan for his father. Former officials from Beijing told him about their personal experiences under Wei's regime, and Zhang incorporated these details into the play, making the plot more dramatic and compelling.

== Historical writings ==
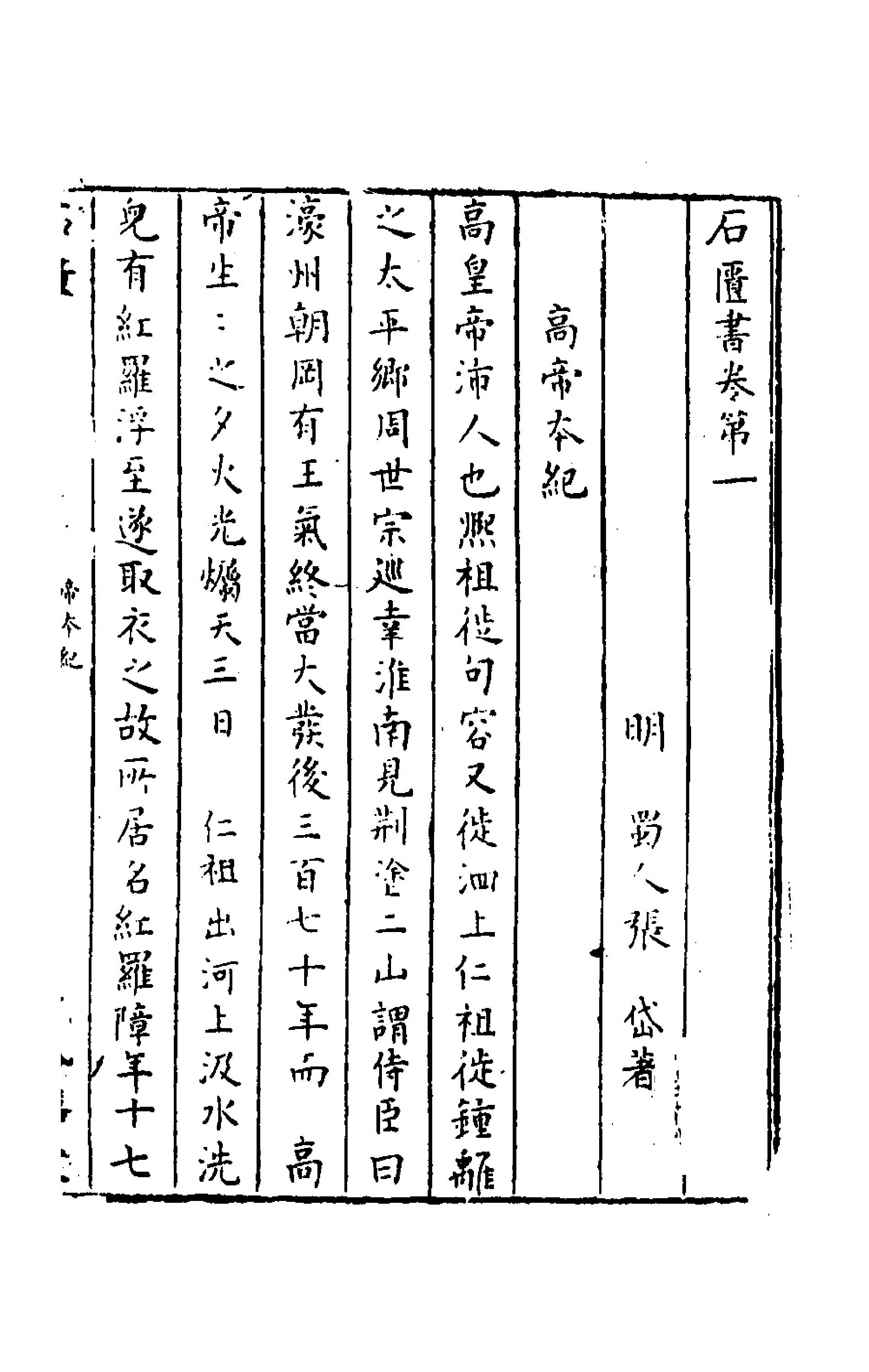
Page from Volume 1 of the Shigui shu, "Basic Annals of the Hongwu Emperor"

Historical writing was a family tradition. Zhang Tianfu and Zhang Yuanbian had both written local gazetteers, and Zhang Dai also felt a strong sense of historiographical duty. He regarded himself primarily as a historian rather than as a literary writer, although modern scholarship generally considers his literary achievement greater than his historiographical achievement. Among historical models, Zhang particularly valued Sima Qian's Records of the Grand Historian and admired the concise narrative style of Ouyang Xiu's Historical Records of the Five Dynasties.

At the age of 22, Zhang began compiling Biographies of Righteous and Heroic Figures Past and Present, completing a draft ten years later. Reading about loyal and righteous figures from earlier ages stirred his emotions, and he gathered biographies of good generals, great scholars, incorruptible officials, enlightened rulers, merchants, monks, and beggars. Each biography was followed by an appraisal. The work was well received among Shaoxing literati.

Zhang's most important historical works are the Shigui shu, in 220 volumes and roughly 2.5 million characters, and its sequel, the Shigui shu houji, in 63 volumes and roughly 500,000 characters. The title "Shigui" ("Stone Casket") alludes to the place where Sima Qian preserved his historical materials, signalling Zhang's admiration for Sima Qian. Zhang undertook the project because he believed that existing Ming histories contained many problems, and he wished to produce a reliable history of the dynasty.

Zhang began writing the Shigui shu in 1628 and completed an initial draft around 1655, although he continued to revise it thereafter. Its structure imitates the Shiji, containing basic annals, tables, treatises, hereditary houses, and biographies. The tables and treatises drew chiefly on Zheng Xiao's Wuxue bian and He Qiaoyuan's Mingshan cang. The biographies relied most heavily on the Mingshan cang, followed by the Xu cangshu, Jiao Hong's Guochao xianzheng lu, and various writings by Wang Shizhen, with occasional material from Zhu Guozhen's Huangming shigai. Because Zhang lacked sufficient materials for the Chongzhen reign, the main Shigui shu stops at the Tianqi period.

Zhang used historical writing to explore the causes of the Ming collapse. He regarded eunuch interference in government and factional struggles as major causes, and criticised the Donglin movement for factional exclusiveness. In his view, signs of corruption were already visible under the Wanli Emperor; under the Tianqi Emperor, when eunuchs dominated the court, the dynasty was terminally ill.

Zhang believed that earlier historians of the Ming had often concealed, distorted, or confused the truth because of political pressures, factional loyalties, personal viewpoints, or lack of sources. He therefore emphasised reliable history, careful collection and verification of materials, factual accuracy, and the historian's duty to write directly without fear of taboo. He also valued field investigation where possible. In expression, he sought to grasp the essence and key points of events, making the prose vivid without unnecessary elaboration.

Zhang later assisted Gu Yingtai in compiling the Ming Shi Jishi Benmo, and many passages in that work drew on the Shigui shu. When Mao Qiling participated in the official compilation of the History of Ming, he wrote to Zhang requesting a manuscript copy of the Shigui shu for reference. The main weakness of the Shigui shu is its obvious dependence on earlier works. Many appraisals borrow from Zheng Xiao, He Qiaoyuan, Wang Shizhen, and others, making it difficult to describe the work as an entirely original historical interpretation. Zhang's abridgements and revisions of earlier biographical materials sometimes introduced errors or inconsistencies, and he occasionally omitted important life details while accepting dubious legends.

In 1657, Zhang obtained Chongzhen-era court gazettes from Gu Yingtai and used them to compile the Shigui shu houji, covering the Chongzhen and Southern Ming periods. He criticised the Chongzhen Emperor for excessive frugality, inconsistency in appointments, and heavy taxation, but his assessment was relatively balanced. He also correctly identified two major problems in the Southern Ming courts: the inability of civil and military officials to cooperate, and conflicts among ministers. Zhang believed that the Ming had effectively ended with Chongzhen's suicide, and that Southern Ming resistance was too weak and fragmented to achieve restoration. Because he saw the Southern Ming princes and powerful ministers as lacking virtue and ability, he did not place the Southern Ming rulers in the basic annals, but instead created a separate "Hereditary Houses of the Five Late Ming Princes" section, which is relatively brief.

Zhang's historical writings emphasise loyalty, righteousness, and martyrdom. He praised those who died for the dynasty and hoped that their examples would inspire later generations. He also approved of reclusion as a way to preserve loyalty and filial integrity. In the Shigui shu houji, he especially commended loyal ministers and civilians who died for the Ming, writing biographies such as "Biographies of Ministers Who Died Fighting the Rebels", "Biographies of Those Who Perished in Jiashen", and "Biographies of the Righteous Dead in Jiangxi". His biography of Yuan Chonghuan, however, contains errors and has been criticised as unfair in its judgement.

Zhang's final work was Illustrated Eulogies of the Three Immortalities of Yue, divided into sections on moral virtue, meritorious service, and literary achievement. The section on moral virtue accounts for about two-thirds of the book. Working with Xu Qin, grandson of Xu Wei, Zhang searched households around Shaoxing for portraits of local historical figures and eventually collected 108 images.

== Hobbies and pursuits ==
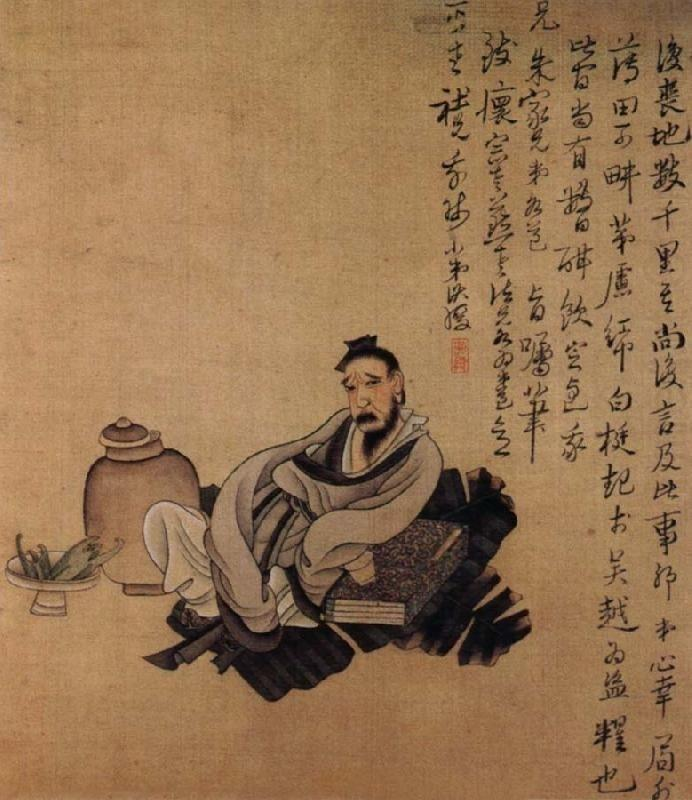
Portrait of Zhang Dai

Zhang's youth was colourful and pleasure-loving. He indulged in refined entertainments and understood many forms of leisure in depth. He famously described himself:

In my youth I was a silk-clad dilettante, deeply attached to splendour and luxury. I loved fine residences, beautiful maids, elegant boys, fresh garments, exquisite food, swift horses, ornate lanterns, fireworks, opera troupes, drum and wind music, antiquities, flowers and birds. I was addicted to tea and citrus, a bookworm and a poetry demon.

Zhang was a specialist in tea connoisseurship, skilled at brewing tea with mountain spring water. He could identify tea leaves and water sources by taste and understood the roasting of tea leaves. Together with his third uncle Zhang Bingfang, he experimented with famous springs and famous teas from different places in order to find the best pairings. He also studied cooking methods for many kinds of food. He enjoyed lantern displays, sought out skilled lantern craftsmen, and organised lantern exhibitions. His hobbies were often pursued with great intensity.

At the age of 19, Zhang became fascinated with the guqin. He persuaded six relatives and friends to study with him, sought instruction from several masters, and practised diligently until he could produce an archaic and austere sound. At times, he performed publicly with teachers and fellow students. At 25, he became absorbed in cockfighting and founded a cockfighting society with fellow enthusiasts. He and his second uncle Zhang Lianfang wagered antiquities, books, paintings, and calligraphy on cockfights. After giving up cockfighting, he became interested in watching cuju. He also enjoyed Chinese dominoes and even designed his own cards.

Zhang was familiar with famous courtesans. Among the entertainers of Nanjing, he particularly admired Wang Yuesheng, with whom he often visited scenic sites such as Yanziji outside the city, and for whom he composed poetry. He also admired the performances of the storyteller Liu Jingting. Zhang once heard Liu tell the episode "Wu Song Fights the Tiger" from the Water Margin and considered Liu's oral performance even more vivid and moving than the written novel, with dramatically heightened details that captivated the audience.

Zhang loved travel. As a young man studying near Panggong Pool in Shaoxing, he kept a small boat there and would set out whenever the mood came upon him, entering the network of local streams. When viewing the moon at West Lake, he especially enjoyed observing the people who came to view it. During his visit to Mount Tai, the weather was initially poor and heavy fog obscured the scenery. Zhang wanted to wait until the mist cleared, but his guide and sedan-chair bearers insisted on descending. The next day, he wanted to climb again, but the guide refused, citing the local belief that a second ascent was inauspicious. Zhang found other bearers and returned to the mountain, finally seeing the magnificent landscape under clear skies.

Zhang also loved snowy scenery. In one celebrated description of snow on West Lake, he wrote that on the lake there remained only "a trace of the long causeway, a dot of the Lake Heart Pavilion, a mustard seed of my boat, and two or three grains of people in the boat". He also enjoyed hunting. On one occasion he rode out from the city in military dress, accompanied by female attendants, mounted followers, hunting dogs, and falcons; he returned the next day and shared the game at a family banquet.

Zhang was deeply fond of theatre and studied singing style, movement, and costume in detail. He spent considerable money and effort staging good plays. Several members of his family maintained theatrical troupes, and Zhang did so as well, inviting performers to sing before guests. In his own troupe, he especially admired the actress Liu Huiji, whose singing he considered extraordinary and whose cross-dressed roles were distinctive. On one journey, Zhang travelled with his troupe and passed Jinshan Temple in Zhenjiang, a site associated with the Song general Han Shizhong's resistance to Jurchen forces. Zhang ordered his actors to perform a play about Han Shizhong's victory in the temple's main hall. Drums and gongs sounded through the night as the troupe performed until dawn.

== Religious views ==
Zhang's mother, Lady Tao, was a sincere Buddhist. As a child, Zhang accompanied her to offer incense at Gaoli Temple in Hangzhou and Caoshan Nunnery in eastern Shaoxing. Zhang himself was not a devout Buddhist in a strict doctrinal sense, but he bowed before Buddhist images, offered incense, made donations, and enjoyed visiting famous temples. He visited temples such as Hangzhou's Lingyin Temple, Tianzhu Temple, and Gaoli Temple; Ningbo's Ayuwang Temple; and Nanjing's Linggu Temple and Qixia Temple. Sometimes he treated temples as places for literati gatherings and conversation.

Zhang was especially interested in Buddhist rituals. On Buddhist festival days, he often went to temples with his family to observe or participate in ceremonies. He attended the spring temple fair at Hangzhou's Zhaoqing Temple every year. He possessed a certain knowledge of Buddhism, though it was not especially systematic or deep. In 1638, he travelled to Mount Putuo off the coast of Ningbo to observe the Guanyin birthday festival on the third day of the fourth lunar month. During more than a month of pilgrimage, he observed vegetarian discipline. On Putuo, he was struck by the simple and unreflective faith of ordinary worshippers. In the same year, Zhang and his friend Qin Yisheng visited Ayuwang Temple in Ningbo. Zhang claimed that, in the temple's Buddhist śarīra relic, he saw the appearance of a small white-robed Guanyin image.

After the fall of the Ming, Zhang shaved his head and lived for a time in an isolated mountain temple. In old age, he built a small thatched hermitage in the hills near Shaoxing and asked the monk there to pray to the Buddha for him and to perform rites for him after death.

Zhang also participated in popular religious practices. During a drought and famine in Shaoxing, he followed the villagers' decision to pray for rain by invoking characters from the Water Margin, believing the title itself to be auspicious because it contained the word "water". Zhang searched for men whose appearance resembled characters from the novel and eventually found thirty-six people to dress as Li Kui, Lin Chong, Wu Song, and others. He believed that the 108 heroes of Liangshan represented celestial spirits who might assist in bringing rain. Before his mother-in-law's death, Zhang prayed for her at the ancestral shrine and also appealed to the deity of Mount Tai. In addition, he read some Catholic writings and wrote an essay on Matteo Ricci.

== Critical reception ==
Zhang's contemporary Qi Biaojia praised his concise style, saying that what Qi himself needed two hundred characters to express, Zhang could convey in just over twenty. Qi Zhijia praised Zhang's familiar essays as combining the strengths of many earlier writers: "the erudition of Li Daoyuan, the pungency of Liu Tong, the elegance of Yuan Hongdao, and the wit of Wang Siren, all suffused with a kind of airy and crystalline spirit". The Qing critic Wang Jiechen described Zhang's prose as "majestic and resonant". Wu Chongyao compared Tao'an mengyi with Meng Yuanlao's Dongjing Meng Hua Lu and Wu Zimu's Meng Liang Lu.

In the early twentieth century, Liu Jianquan regarded Zhang's prose as a source for modern literary renewal. Modern scholars often view Zhang as a representative figure of the late Ming and early Qing literary movement that opposed rigid archaism and advocated the expression of individual sensibility in short prose.
