= Pockmarked Liu =

Pockmarked Liu or Liu Mazi may refer to:

- Liu Jingting (c. 1587–1670), Chinese storyteller of the Ming dynasty, nicknamed "Pockmarked Liu" (Chinese: 柳麻子)
- Liu Mingchuan (1836–1896), Chinese official and general of the Qing dynasty, nicknamed "Pockmarked Liu" (Chinese: 劉麻子)
- Pockmarked Liu (Chinese: 刘麻子), a major character from Lao She's play Teahouse
