= Xiaopeng =

Xiaopeng (simplified Chinese: 小鹏; traditional Chinese: 小鵬; pinyin: Xiǎo-Péng; Wade–Giles: Hsiao-Peng) may refer to:

== People ==
- He Xiaopeng (Chinese: 何小鹏; pinyin: Hé Xiǎopéng; born 1977) Chinese entrepreneur, founder of XPeng
- Li Xiaopeng (politician) (Chinese: 李小鹏; born 1959) Chinese businessman
- Li Xiaopeng (gymnast) (simplified Chinese: 李小鹏; traditional Chinese: 李小鵬; pinyin: Lǐ Xiǎopéng; born 1981) Chinese gymnast
- Li Xiaopeng (footballer) (simplified Chinese: 李霄鹏; traditional Chinese: 李霄鵬; pinyin: Lǐ Xiāopéng; born 1975) Chinese soccer player
- Lu Xiaopeng (Chinese: 陆孝彭; pinyin: Lù Xiàopéng; Wade–Giles: Lu Hsiao-p'eng; 1920-2000) Chinese aircraft designer

== Other uses ==
- XPeng (Chinese: 小鹏汽车; Xiǎopéng Qìchē), a Chinese electric car company

== See also ==
- Xiao (disambiguation)
- Peng (disambiguation)
- Li Xiaopeng (disambiguation)
- Xiaoping (disambiguation)
- Xiaopin (disambiguation)
