= Xiaoping =

Xiaoping may refer to:

== People ==
- Emperor Ping (孝平, Xiaoping), posthumous name of the Han emperor
- Deng Xiaoping (邓小平), former paramount leader of China, Chinese communist leader
- Li Xiaoping (李小平), Chinese gymnast
- Ren Xiaoping (任晓平), Chinese orthopedic surgeon
- Zhang Xiaoping (张小平), Mongol Chinese boxer

== Places ==
- Xiaoping, Chenxi (孝坪镇, Xiàopíng), a town in Hunan, China; of Chenxi County
- Xiaoping, Zhijiang County (晓坪乡, Xiǎopíng), a township in Hunan, China; of Zhijiang Dong Autonomous County

== See also ==
- Xiaopeng (disambiguation)
- Xiaopin (disambiguation)
