= Li Xiaopeng =

Li Xiaopeng is the name of the following Chinese people:

- Li Xiaopeng (politician) (born 1959), Minister of Transport
- Li Xiaopeng (banker) (born 1959), Chinese banker, chairman of China Everbright Group Co., Ltd.
- Li Xiaopeng (footballer) (born 1975), professional soccer player
- Li Xiaopeng (gymnast) (born 1981), Olympic gymnast

== See also ==
- Li (disambiguation)
- Li Xiaoping, gymnast
- Lu Xiaopeng, aircraft designer
- Xiaopeng (disambiguation)
