= Timeline of Chinese music =

This is a timeline that show the development of Chinese music by genre and region. It covers the historic China as well as the geographic areas of Taiwan, Hong Kong and Macau.

== Dynastic periods ==
=== Zhou dynasty ===
- System of formal music yayue established.
- Lyrics of folk songs recorded.
- Decline of yayue by the end of the Spring and Autumn period, increased popularity of new music from Wey and Zheng states.

=== Qin to Han dynasty ===
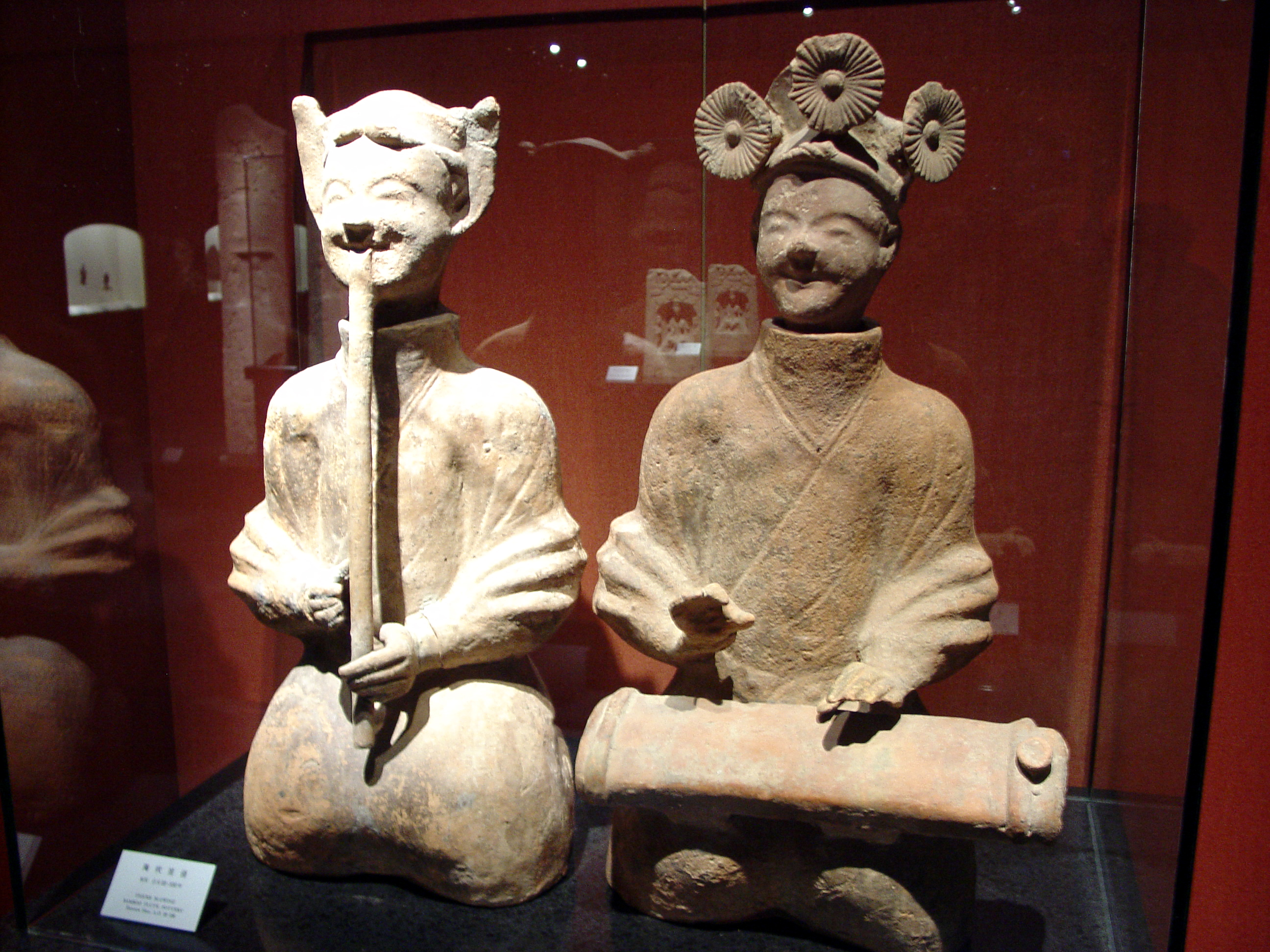
Lively musicians playing a bamboo flute and a plucked instrument, Chinese ceramic statues from the Eastern Han period (25-220 AD), Shanghai Museum

- Establishment of the Music Bureau to collect folk music.

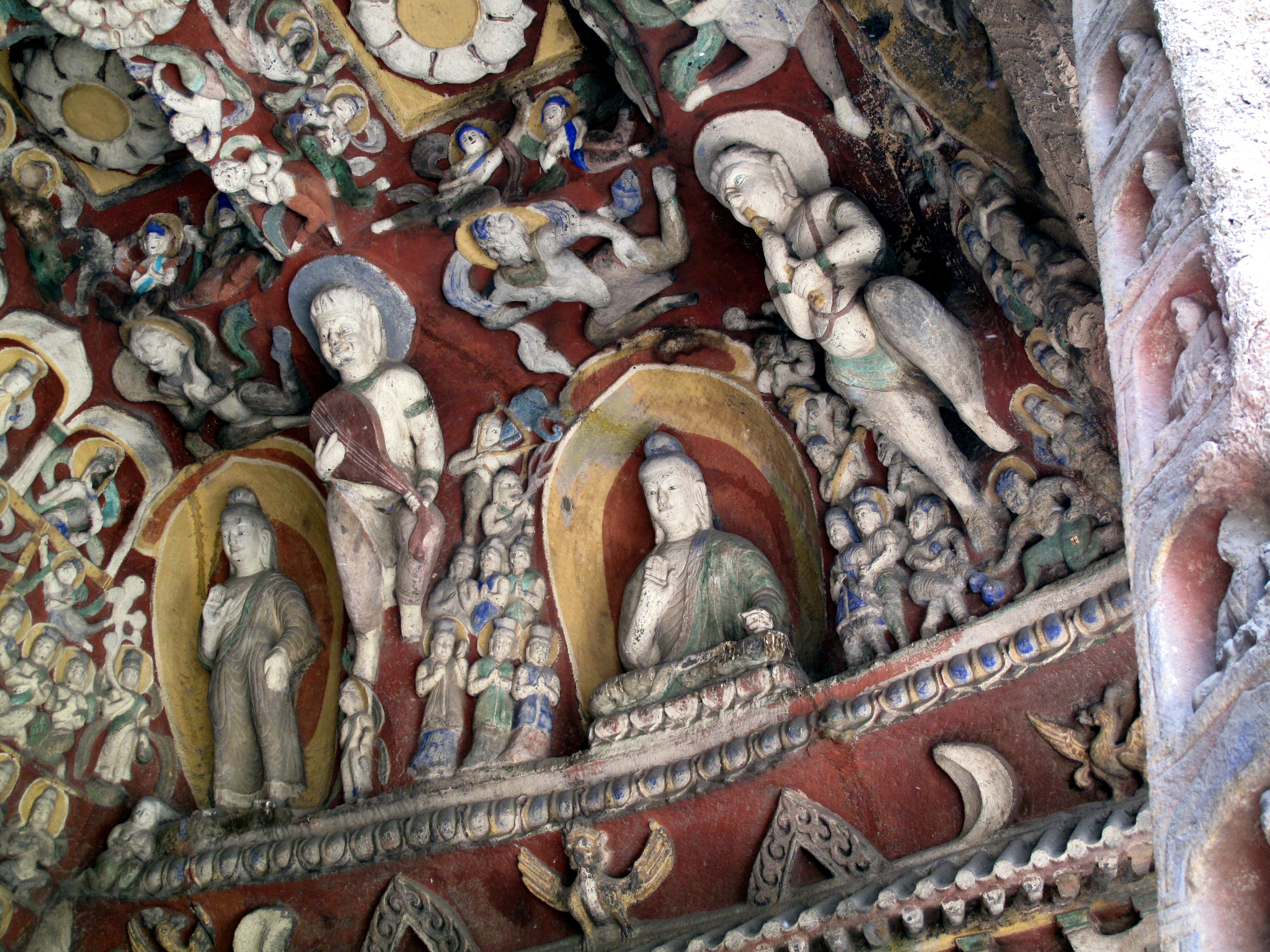
Buddhist art from the Yungang Grottoes, Datong, c. 465 AD (Northern Wei dynasty), showing musicians playing the pipa and sheng

=== Sui to Tang dynasty ===
- Founding of various academies and music departments -

The Great Music Bureau (大樂署) responsible for yayue and yanyue (燕樂, entertainment music and dance for banquet)
The Royal Academy founded by Emperor Gaozu
"Pear Garden", an acting and music academy founded by Emperor Xuanzong.
The Drum and Pipes Bureau (鼓吹署) responsible for ceremonial music.

- Influence from Central Asian, Persian and Indian music.
- Oldest surviving notated music in China - Youlan.

=== Song to Yuan dynasty ===
- Revival of yayue due to the revival of Neo-Confucianism
- Increasing popularity of Chinese opera such as nanxi opera and zaju theatre.
- The artform of Ci poetry which is meant to be sung reached its zenith in the Song dynasty.

=== Ming dynasty ===
- Kunqu opera.

=== Qing dynasty ===
- Development of Peking opera.
- Beginning of New Music in late the 19th century under influence of Western music.

== 1900s ==
Hong Kong:

- Popular English and western classical music grew with British influence.

== 1910s ==
Republic of China:

- The dynastic period ends. New China tries to find a national anthem.
- Beginning of active development of New Music in New Culture Movement.

== 1920s ==
Republic of China:

- Shidaiqu started by Li Jinhui, which forms the basis of all Chinese pop music genres such as C-pop, mandopop and cantopop.

== 1930s ==
Republic of China:

- Heyday of Shidaiqu in Shanghai which lasted until the 1940s.
- Development of modern Chinese orchestra.

Taiwan:

- Japanese enka influence Hokkien pop for Taiwanese people.

== 1940s ==
People's Republic of China:

- The Chinese Communist Party (CCP) labeled pop music as yellow music (pornography).
- CCP promote national music.
- Government control of music via censorship begins.

== 1950s ==
People's Republic of China:

- Baak Doi leaves China in 1952 and relocates to Hong Kong.
- Mao Zedong and CCP evolved patriotic music into revolutionary music.

Hong Kong:

- Continuation of Shidaiqu in Hong Kong.

Republic of China / Taiwan:

- Development of Taiwanese mandopop.
- Native Hokkien pop phased out by Kuomintang in favor of mandopop.

== 1960s ==
Hong Kong:

- Decline of Shidaiqu.
- Popularity English pop around mid-1960s but beginning to fade by the late 1960s.
- Beginning of cantopop in the late 1960s with Roman Tam as the father of the new genre.
- Popularizing of Huangmei tone.
- Popularizing of Hong Kong musical tongue twister.

== 1970s ==
ROC Taiwan:

- Teresa Teng expanded mandopop in Taiwan. Beats censorship in the mainland.

Hong Kong:

- Increasing popularity of cantopop.

== 1980s ==
People's Republic of China:

- China begins the importation of gangtai music.
- The "first generation" of Mainland Chinese pop singers emerge, such as Zhang Qiang, Cheng Lin, Zhu Fengbo (朱逢博), Cheng Fangyuan (成方圆), Shen Xiaocen (沈小岑) and Zhu Mingying (朱明瑛).
- Tiananmen Square led to the popularizing of Northwest Wind.
- Northwest wind became prison song.

== 1990s ==
People's Republic of China:

- Prison song became Chinese rock with Cui Jian as the father of the new genre.
- Popularity of gangtai music.

Hong Kong SAR:

- Karaoke culture begins.

ROC Taiwan

- Hokkien pop re-emergence.

== 2000s ==
People's Republic of China:

- Punk rock begins in China.

Hong Kong SAR and ROC Taiwan

- Chinese hip hop begins in Hong Kong and Taiwan.

== 2010s ==
- 2015: Establishment of the Billboard China V Chart.

== See also ==
- Timeline of Chinese history
- Timeline of Hong Kong history
- Music of China
- Music of Hong Kong
- Music of Taiwan
