= Li Kui =

Li Kui may refer to:

- Li Kui (legalist), government minister in the Wei state
- Li Kui (chancellor), chancellor of the Tang Dynasty
- Li Kui (Water Margin), fictional character in the Water Margin
