= Xiao =

Xiao may refer to:

== People ==
- Xiao (surname), a Chinese surname sometimes also romanized as Hsiao, Siaw, Siew, Siow, Seow, Siu or Sui
- Duke Xiao of Qin, Chinese ruler of the state of Qin
- Prince Xiao of Liang, the posthumous title of Liu Wu, younger brother of the Han emperor Jing
- Empress Dowager Xiaozhuang (1613–1688), empress dowager of the Qing Dynasty
- Xiao Guodong (born 1989), Chinese professional snooker player
- Xiao He, first chancellor of the Han Dynasty
- Xiao Hong (1911–1942), Chinese writer
- Xiao Hua Gong, Chinese-Canadian businessman and politician
- Xiao Jianhua (born c. 1972), Chinese-Canadian businessman
- Xiao Qian (1910–1999), Chinese essayist
- Xiao Qiang, Chinese human rights activist
- Xiao Qiao, the younger of the Qiao sisters
- Xiao San (1896-1983), Chinese writer
- Xiao Zhan (born 1991), a member of C-pop group XNINE and a Chinese actor
- Xiao De Jun (Xiao Jun) (born 1999), a member of C-Pop group WayV

== Places in Mainland China ==
- Xiao County (Chinese: 萧县), in Anhui
- Xiao Mountain (Chinese: 崤山), a range of mountains in Henan, or the surrounding Xiao region
- Xiao River (Chinese: 潇水), a tributary of the Xiang River, in Hunan

== Media ==
- Xiao Xiao, cartoons by Zhu Zhiqiang
- Xiao Jing, the Chinese name of the Classic of Filial Piety

=== Fiction ===
- Xiao (mythology) (Chinese: 嚣), certain legendary creatures in Chinese mythology
- Ling Xiaoyu, a character from the Tekken video game series, also known as Xiao
- Xiao (Genshin Impact), a character in 2020 video game Genshin Impact

== Other uses ==
- Filial piety (Chinese: 孝; pinyin: Xiào), or "being good to parents", a virtue in Chinese culture
- Xiao (flute) (Chinese: 箫), a Chinese end-blown flute
- Xiao (rank) (Chinese: 校), a rank used for field officers in the Chinese military
