= Zhou Wenjing =

Chinese imperial painter

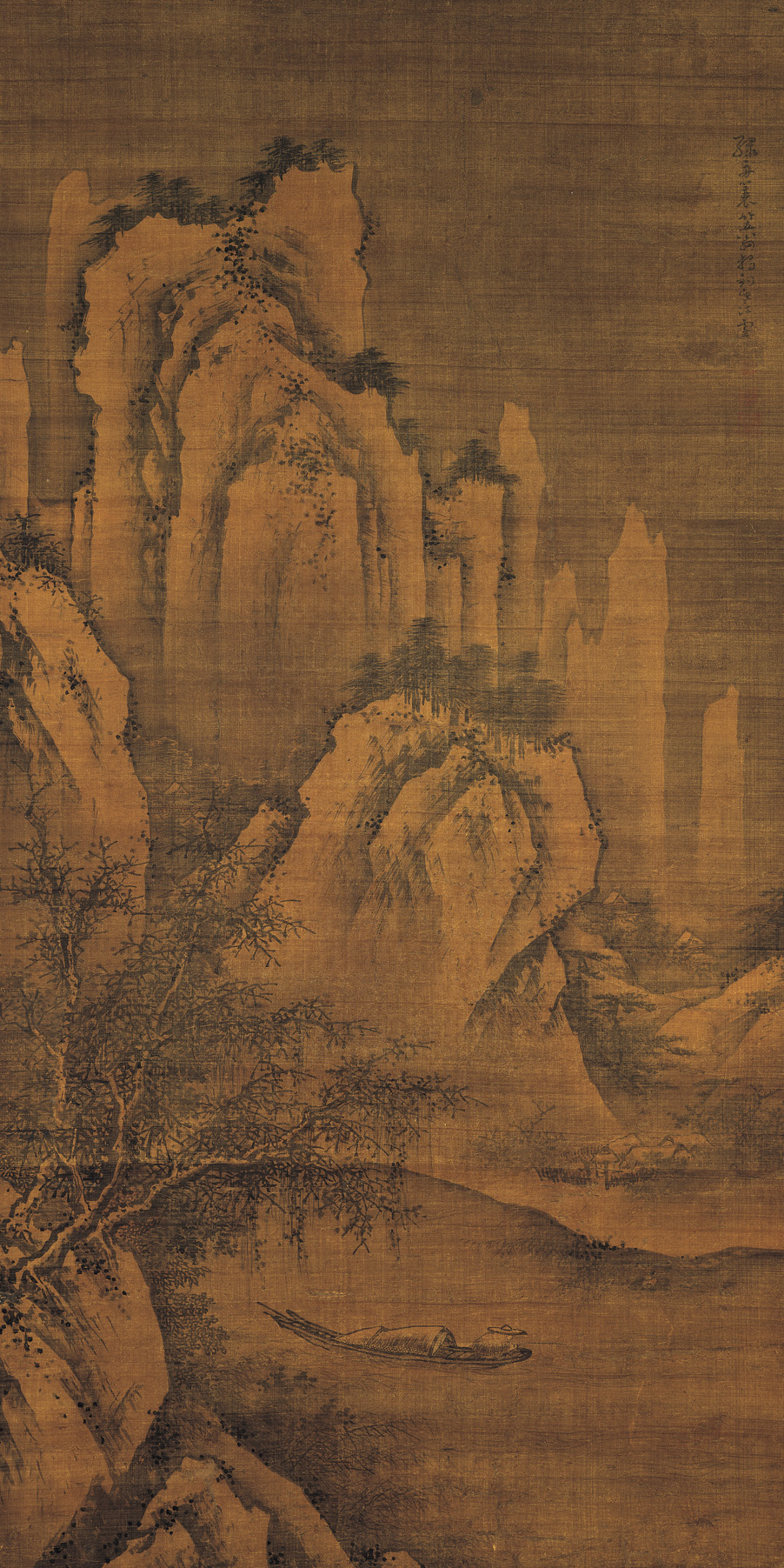
Landscape (山水圖), ink and color on silk, National Palace Museum, Taipei

Zhou Wenjing (Chinese: 周文靖; pinyin: Zhōu Wénjìng; Wade–Giles: Chou Wen-ching) was a Chinese imperial painter during the Ming Dynasty. His birth and death dates are unknown, but he was active until some time after 1463.

Zhou, pseudonym Sanshan (三山), was a native of Hexian (now Putian) in Fujian province. He was skillful at landscape painting and followed in the style of Xia Gui. He enjoyed the patronage of the elderly Xie Huan.
