= Xiaopin =

Xiaopin (Chinese: 小品; lit. 'small article') can refer to:

- Sketch comedy in Chinese
- Xiaopin (literary genre), a form of short essay popular in the sixteenth and seventeenth centuries.
  - Notebook style essay
- Xiaopin (Late Ming book) - A book published in the late Ming era.
- Xiaopin (Buddhist concept)
- Bagatelle (music)
- Grammatical particle

== See also ==
- Xiaopeng (disambiguation)
- Xiaoping (disambiguation)
