= Pear Garden =

Chinese name
- Traditional Chinese: 梨園
- Simplified Chinese: 梨园
Transcriptions
Standard Mandarin
- Hanyu Pinyin: Líyuán

Japanese name
- Kanji: 梨園
- Hiragana: りえん
Transcriptions
- Romanization: Rien

The Liyuan or Pear Garden was the first known royal performing arts and musical academy in China. Founded during the Tang dynasty by Emperor Xuanzong (712–755), it is an example of an early institutional academy of performing arts and music.

The Tang dynasty (618–907) is sometimes known as "The Age of 1000 Entertainments". Emperor Xuanzong established a school in the palace city Chang'an (now Xi'an) for performances in music, dancing, and acting. Three hundred musicians and performers were trained annually under the supervision of the emperor, who sometimes joined in the training as well as the performances. The Pear Garden, so named after the pear trees planted inside, was an acting school established to produce a form of drama that was primarily musical, although this suffered from the vicissitudes of the An Lushan Rebellion. Performers were commonly called "Children of the Pear Garden", and in later dynasties the phrase "Pear Garden" was used to refer to the world of Chinese opera in general.

In Japan, the Rien refers to the Kabuki society.

== See also ==
- Chinese garden
- Music Bureau
- Kabuki
