= Liu Jingting =

Liu Jingting (柳敬亭, ca.1587–ca. 1670) was a Chinese raconteur.

Liu had a swarthy pockmarked face. Thus, he was nicknamed "Pockmarked Liu". His original surname is Cao. He had an unscrupulous adolescence in Taizhou. Using an alias, he got off the indictment and fled toward Xuyi, at the age of about 15. There, he began to live on storytelling.

Liu flittered around the south of the Yangtze River (Jiangnan) later. He met Mo Houguang, a Confucian tutor, in Songjiang and was given instruction in storytelling. Improved with practice, Liu's performance won wide admiration. He was active in Nanjing since the 1620s, and was frequently invited by contemporary gentry. Besides, he had a good rapport with members of Revival Society (復社), a fraction against pro-Wei Zhongxian. When General Zuo Liangyu garrisoned Wuchang, Liu was recommended to him. Zuo excluded the rhetorical arguments from his Confucian scholars, but favour Liu's witty and lucid speech. Thus, Liu served as his advisor. He even designated Liu as his representative to the court in Nanjing. Liu also used his stories to inspire the army.

After Zuo's death, Liu had to resumed his career. His business got worse in the embattled Jiangnan. In his eighties, he still worked at streets.

Liu is made as a minor character who has righteous, brave and loyal attributes in the play The Peach Blossom Fan.
