= Heluo =

Heluo may refer to:

- Heluo fish from Chinese mythology
- Heluo, Henan, town in Gongyi, Henan, China
- Heluo, Shandong, town in Laiyang, Shandong, China
- Hoklo people or Heluo people, a Han Chinese subgroup
  - Hokkien or Heluo language
