= Su Hui (poet) =

Fourth century Chinese poet

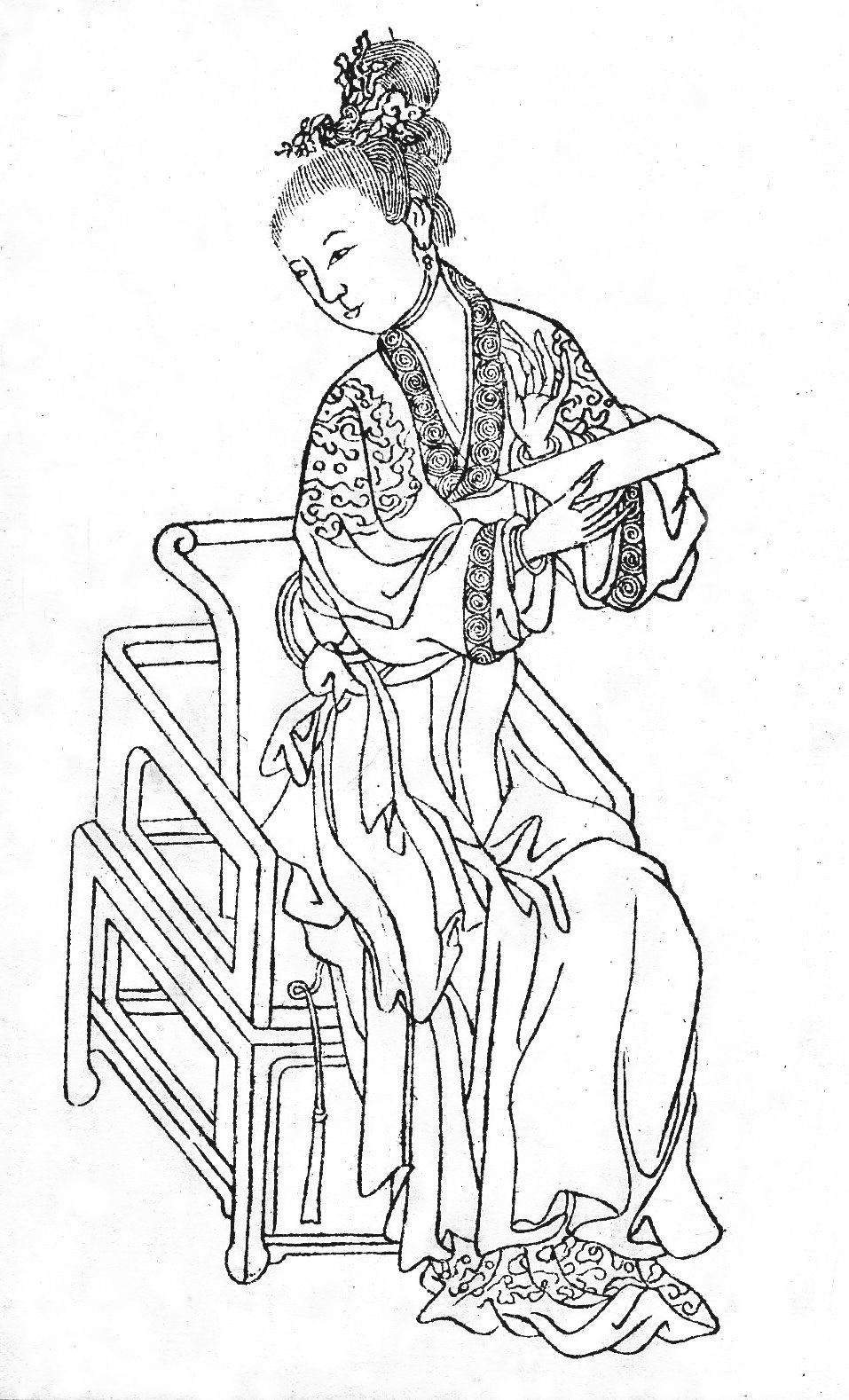
Su Hui, from an 18th-century book, Wan hsiao tang, by Kuan-Shou

Su Hui (simplified Chinese: 苏蕙; traditional Chinese: 蘇蕙; pinyin: Sū Huì, fourth century CE) was a Chinese poet of the Former Qin dynasty during the Sixteen Kingdoms period (304 to 439) of the Six Dynasties. Her courtesy name is Ruolan (traditional Chinese: 若蘭; simplified Chinese: 若兰; pinyin: Ruòlán).

Su is famous for her extremely complex palindrome poem (huiwen 回文), later named Star Gauge (璇璣圖 Xuanji Tu). She apparently innovated this genre of poetry and produced the most complex example to date. Su Hui is depicted in the Wu Shuang Pu (無雙譜, Table of Peerless Heroes) by Jin Guliang.

== Biography ==
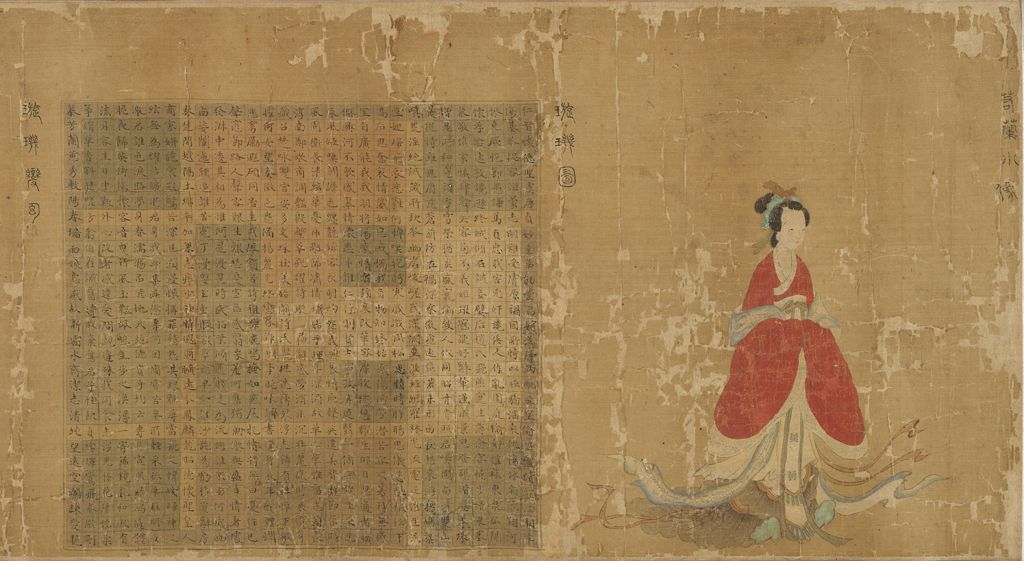
Su Hui with her great palindrome, the Xuanji Tu

Su Hui was born into a scholarly family in Wugong County, Shiping Commandery (始平郡; in present-day Shaanxi) as the third daughter of the official, Su Daozhi (蘇道質). At the time, northern China was in the midst of the chaotic Sixteen Kingdoms era. Her hometown came under control of the Former Qin dynasty (351–394), founded by the Fu clan of Di ethnicity. Su Hui was active during the reign of the third ruler, Fu Jian (357–385), who was most known for nearly unifying all of China before suffering great calamity at the Battle of Fei River in 383. During this period, Su Hui married at sixteen (fifteen, by Western reckoning), and went to live with her husband, Dou Tao (竇滔) in Qin Province (modern day Tianshui, Gansu), where he served as the provincial inspector for the Former Qin.

== The Star Gauge poem ==
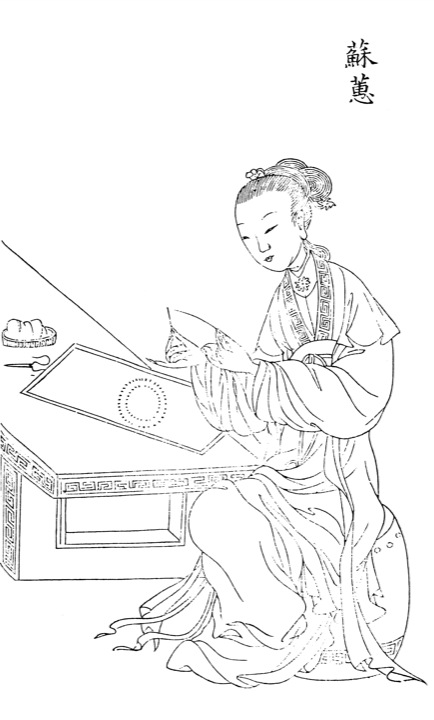
Su Hui embroidering in circle from a Qing dynasty illustration

Su Hui is known for an important and unusual palindrome poem. Posthumously, the poem was named Star Gauge or "the armillary sphere chart". It was described in contemporary sources as shuttle-woven on brocade, meant to be read in a circle, and consisting of 112 or else 840 characters. By the Tang period, the following story about the poem was current:

Dou Tao of Qinzhou was exiled to the desert, away from his wife Lady Su. Upon departure from Su, Dou swore that he would not marry another person. However, as soon as he arrived in the desert region, he married someone. Lady Su composed a circular poem, wove it into a piece of brocade, and sent it to him.

Another source, naming the poem as Xuanji Tu (Picture of the Turning Sphere), claims that it was a palindromic poem comprehensible only to Dou (which would explain why none of the Tang sources reprinted it), and that when he read it, he left his desert wife and returned to Su Hui.

The text of the poem was circulated continuously in medieval China and was never lost, but during the Song dynasty it became scarce. The 112-character version was included in early sources. The earliest excerpts of the 840 character version date from a 10th-century text by Li Fang. Several 13th-century copies were attributed to famous women of the Song dynasty, but falsely so.

In the Ming dynasty the poem became quite popular and scholars discovered 7,940 ways to read it. It was also mentioned in the story Flowers in the Mirror. The poem is in the form of a twenty-nine by twenty-nine character grid, and can be read forward or backwards, horizontally, vertically, or diagonally, as well as within its color-coded grids.

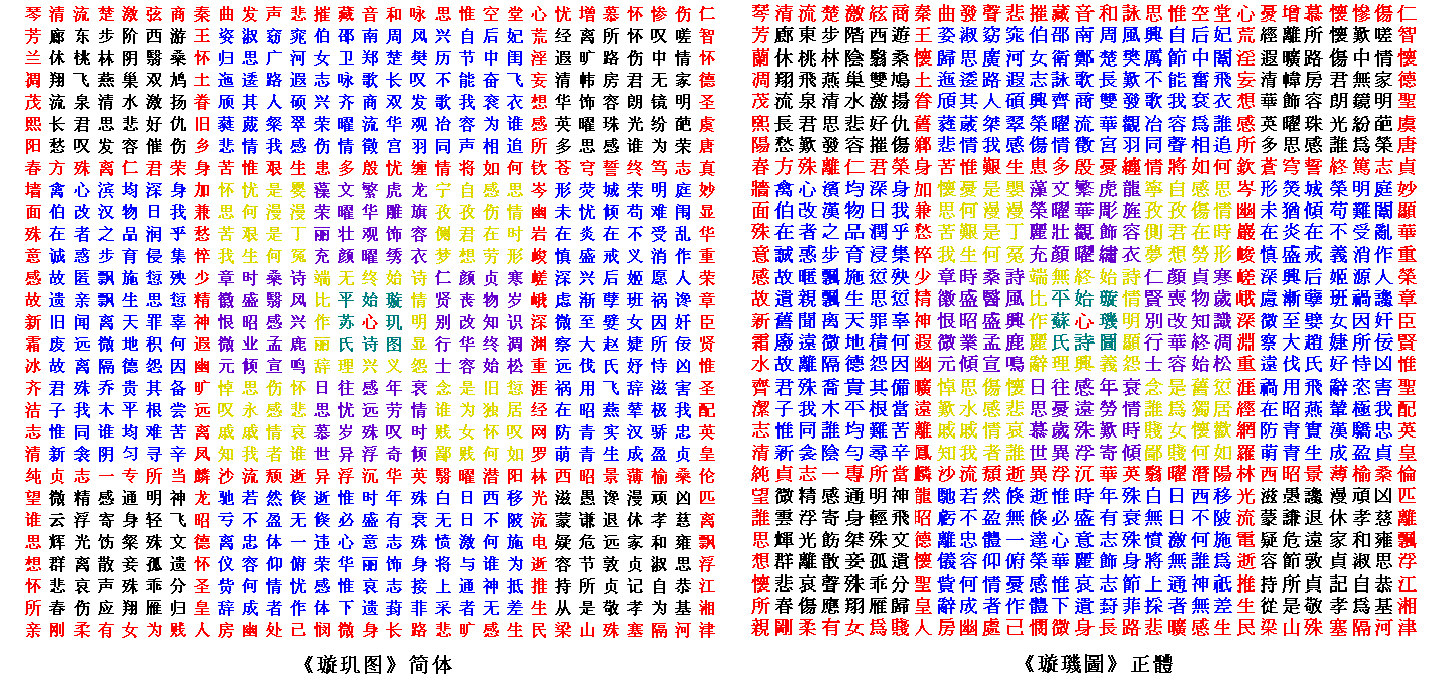
Su Hui's Xuanji Tu palindrome poem in simplified characters (left) and in the original traditional characters (right)

During the Qing dynasty the character 心 (heart), previously only implied, was added to the center of the poem, so that it now has 841 characters.

== Other poems ==
Other poems attributed to Su Hui are extant, but seem to date from the Ming Period.

== See also ==
- Classical Chinese poetry
- Classical Chinese poetry genres
- Six Dynasties poetry
- Chinese Wikipedia article on Su Hui (in Chinese)
- Chinese Wikipedia article on Su Hui's poem (in Chinese) With color text and image versions of her Xuanji Tu.
