= Heluo fish =

Chinese mythological creature

An illustration of Heluo fish from the 18th-century Complete Classics Collection of Ancient China.

In Chinese mythology, Heluo fish (simplified Chinese: 何罗鱼; traditional Chinese: 何羅魚; pinyin: Héluóyú) and Zi fish (simplified Chinese: 茈鱼; traditional Chinese: 茈魚; pinyin: Zǐyú) are fish with one head and ten bodies.

== Descriptions ==
The ancient text Classic of Mountains and Seas explains (trans. Anne Birrell):

...Four hundred leagues further north is a mountain called Mount Burnbright. The River Burning rises here and flows west to empty into the Great River. The River Burning contains many what-not fish [Heluo fish] with one head and ten bodies. They make a noise like a dog barking. If you eat them, they will cure cancerous growths.

— Book Three, The Classic of the Northern Mountains, Chapter 1

...The River Limpid rises here and flows northeast to empty into the sea. This river contains many fine cowrie shells and numerous red-dye fish [Zi fish] which look like perch. They have one head and ten bodies, and they smell like the scent-herb. If you eat them, you won't have attacks of farting.

— Book Four, The Classic of the Eastern Mountains, Chapter 4

In the 1827 fantasy novel Flowers in the Mirror by Li Ruzhen, the protagonist Tang Ao encountered such a creature in a fishing net at the "Country of Black-bottomed People" and wondered whether it was the fragrant Zi fish. His brother-in-law Lin Zhiyang smelled it and retched, whereupon Duo Jiugong—their companion—laughed and suggested kicking it. When it barked like a dog, they all knew that it was a Heluo fish. Old Duo then explained the difference between the species: "One smells heavenly, and the other extremely foul."

== Xiujiu bird ==
In the 16th century, Yang Shen wrote in Encomiums on Strange Fish (異魚圖贊, 1544) that, just like the Kun fish (which can transform itself into a bird), the Heluo fish can also change into a bird known as Xiujiu (休舊), notorious for stealing husked rice and falling into mortars, dead. The Xiujiu bird often shrieked as it flew by at night and unlike the Heluo fish, it was scared of thunder and lightning.

== In popular culture ==
Black Myth: Wukong features the Heluo Fish as a fightable Yaoguai found mainly in chapter 3, known as "Monk from the Sea". With one particular monk being fought as a boss in New Thunderclap Temple, beating it rewards the Destined One with the ability to transform into a Monk from the Sea. A Heluo Fish also appears as the "Hubris Nose" relic after beating Yellowbrow.

== See also ==
- Cephalopod, marine animals with one head and numerous arms or tentacles
