= Star Gauge =

Reversible Chinese poem written by Su Hui

- Traditional Chinese: 璇璣圖
- Simplified Chinese: 璇玑图
- Literal meaning: Chart of the Armillary Sphere
Transcriptions
Standard Mandarin
- Hanyu Pinyin: Xuánjī Tú
Wu
- Romanization: zi^{2} ci^{1} du^{2}
Yue: Cantonese
- Jyutping: syun^{4} gei^{1} tou^{4}
Middle Chinese
- Middle Chinese: zjwen kj+j du

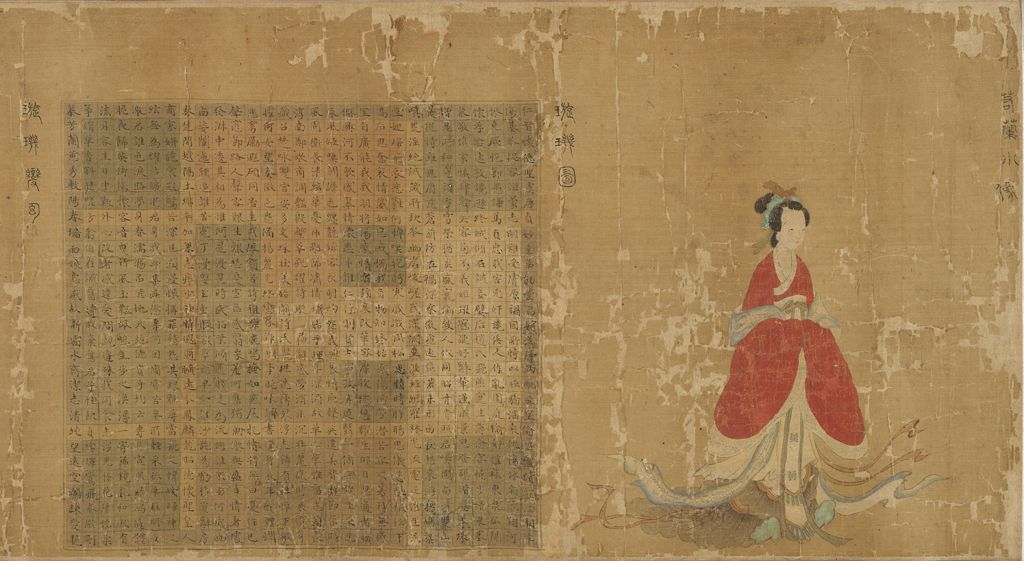
Portrait of Lady Su Hui next to the poem

The Star Gauge (Chinese: 璇璣圖; pinyin: Xuánjī Tú), or translated as "the armillary sphere chart", is the posthumous title given to a 4th-century Classical Chinese poem written by the Former Qin poet Su Hui for her husband during the Sixteen Kingdoms period. It consists of a 29 by 29 grid of characters, forming a reversible poem that can be read in different ways to form roughly 3,000 smaller rhyming poems. The outer border forms a single circular poem, thought to be both the first and the longest of its kind.

== Description ==
The Star Gauge consists of 841 characters in a grid. The original was described by contemporary sources as shuttle-woven on brocade. It was composed by Su Hui during a time when East Asian Mādhyamaka was one of the predominant philosophical schools in the area.

The outer border is meant to be read in a circle. The grid is known as a palindrome poem, and can be read in different ways to generate over 3,000 shorter poems, in which the second line of every couplet rhymes with that of the next. The largest set of such poems are 2,848 four-liners with seven characters per line. In the image below, the maroon grid is made up of 32 seven-character phrases. These may be read in certain patterns around the perimeter, and in other patterns for the internal grid. Other poems can be formed by reading characters from the other colored sections.

== Full text ==
琴清流楚激弦商秦曲發聲悲摧藏音和詠思惟空堂心憂增慕懷慘傷仁
芳廊東步階西遊王姿淑窈窕伯邵南周風興自后妃荒經離所懷歎嗟智
蘭休桃林陰翳桑懷歸思廣河女衛鄭楚樊厲節中闈淫遐曠路傷中情懷
凋翔飛燕巢雙鳩土迤逶路遐志詠歌長嘆不能奮飛妄清幃房君無家德
茂流泉清水激揚眷頎其人碩興齊商雙發歌我袞衣想華飾容朗鏡明聖
熙長君思悲好仇舊蕤葳桀翠榮曜流華觀冶容為誰感英曜珠光紛葩虞
陽愁嘆發容摧傷鄉悲情我感傷情徵宮羽同聲相追所多思感誰為榮唐
春方殊離仁君榮身苦惟艱生患多殷憂纏情將如何欽蒼穹誓終篤志貞
牆禽心濱均深身加懷憂是嬰藻文繁虎龍寧自感思岑形熒城榮明庭妙
面伯改漢物日我兼思何漫漫榮曜華雕旌孜孜傷情幽未猶傾苟難闈顯
殊在者之品潤乎愁苦艱是丁麗壯觀飾容側君在時岩在炎在不受亂華
意誠惑步育浸集悴我生何冤充顏曜繡衣夢想勞形峻慎盛戒義消作重
感故暱飄施愆殃少章時桑詩端無終始詩仁顏貞寒嵯深興後姬源人榮
故遺親飄生思愆精徽盛醫風比平始璇情賢喪物歲峨慮漸孽班禍讒章
新舊聞離天罪辜神恨昭盛興作蘇心璣明別改知識深微至嬖女因奸臣
霜廢遠微地積何遐微業孟鹿麗氏詩圖顯行華終凋淵察大趙婕所佞賢
水故離隔德怨因幽元傾宣鳴辭理興義怨士容始松重遠伐氏好恃兇惟
齊君殊喬貴其備曠悼思傷懷日往感年衰念是舊愆涯禍用飛辭恣害聖
傑子我木平根當遠嘆水感悲思憂遠勞情誰為獨居經在昭燕輦極我配
志惟同誰均難苦離戚戚情哀慕歲殊嘆時賤女懷歡網防青實漢驕忠英
清新衾陰勻尋辛鳳知我者誰世異浮寄傾鄙賤何如羅萌青生成盈貞皇
純貞志一專所當麟沙流頹逝異浮沉華英翳曜潛陽林西昭景薄榆桑倫
望微精感通明神龍馳若然倏逝惟時年殊白日西移光滋愚讒漫頑凶匹
誰雲浮寄身輕飛昭虧不盈無倏必盛有衰無日不陂流蒙謙退休孝慈離
思輝光飭桀殊文德離忠體一達心意志殊憤激何施電疑危遠家和雍飄
想群離散妾孤遺懷儀容仰俯榮華麗飾身將無誰為逝容節敦貞淑思浮
懷悲哀聲殊乖分聖貲何情憂感惟哀志節上通神祇推持所貞記自恭江
所春傷應翔雁歸皇辭成者作體下遺葑菲採者無差生從是敬孝為基湘
親剛柔有女為賤人房幽處己憫微身長路悲曠感生民梁山殊塞隔河津

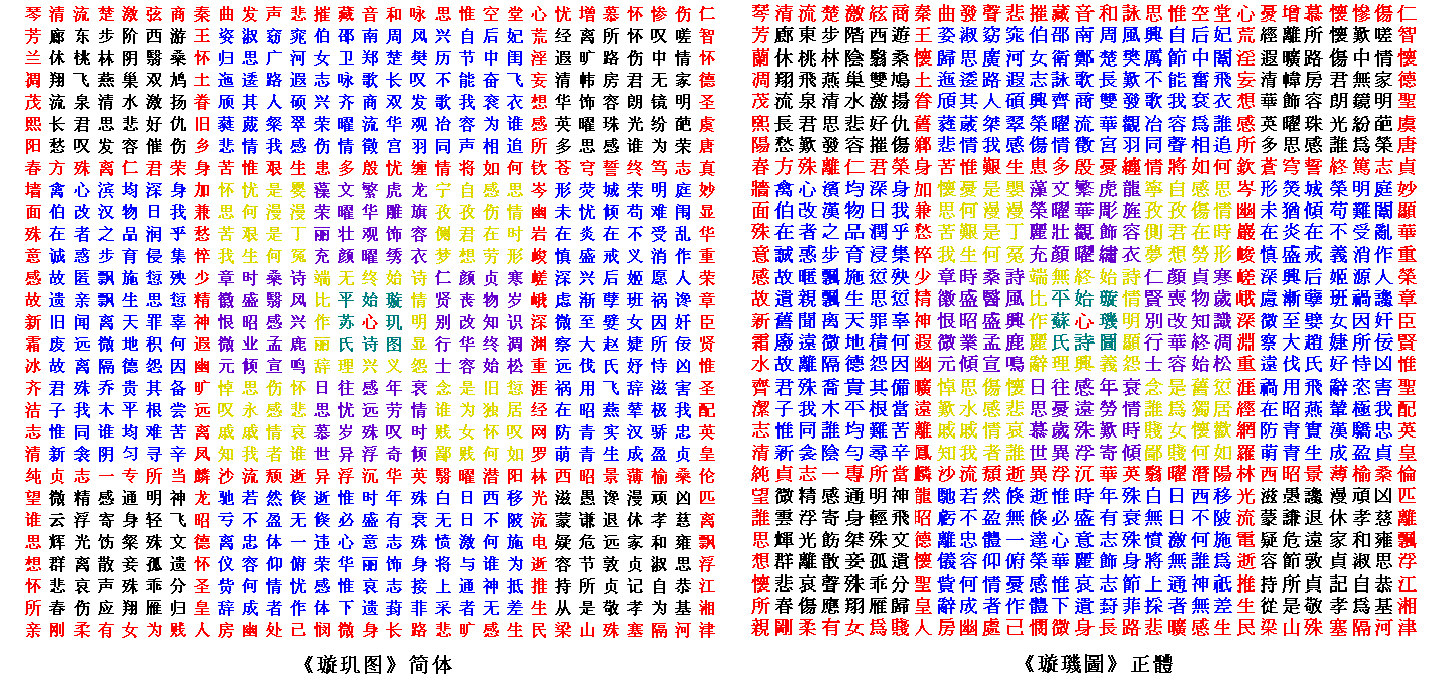
Star Gauge in simplified characters (left) and in the original traditional characters (right)

== History ==
Early sources focused on the circular poem composing the outer border of the grid, consisting of 112 characters. Later sources described the whole grid of 840 characters (not counting the central character 心 xin, meaning "heart", which lends meaning to the whole but is not part of any of the smaller poems).

The text of the poem was circulated continuously in medieval China and was never lost, but during the Song dynasty it became scarce. The 112-character version was included in early sources. The earliest surviving excerpts of the entire grid version date from a 10th-century text by Li Fang.

While sources agree that Su was a talented poet, the background story and interpretation of the poem changed over the centuries, from the lament of a wife longing for her husband, to a wife worrying about her husband fighting on the frontier, to a jealous wife competing for her husband's affections.

By the Tang period, a popular story of Su Hui's life was attributed to empress Wu Zetian, though this is likely a creative misattribution for narrative effect. This included the following description of the poem:

Dou Tao of Qinzhou was exiled to the desert, away from his wife Lady Su. Upon departure from Su, Dou swore that he would not marry another person. However, as soon as he arrived in the desert region, he married someone. Lady Su composed a circular poem, wove it into a piece of brocade, and sent it to him.

Another source, naming the poem as Xuanji Tu (Picture of the Turning Sphere), claimed that the grid as a whole was a palindromic poem comprehensible only to Dou (which would explain why none of the Tang sources reprinted it), and that when he read it, he left his desert wife and returned to Su Hui.

Some 13th-century copies were attributed to famous women of the Song dynasty, but falsely so. The poem was also mentioned in the novel Flowers in the Mirror.

== See also ==
- Classical Chinese poetry
- A Hundred Thousand Billion Poems
