= Jia Qian =

Chinese jurist

Jia Qian (贾潜) (May 9, 1903 – 1996, in Yanggongdian Village, Huaxian County, Henan Province) was a Chinese Communist Party member. In the 1940s, he worked as a lawyer in anti-Japenese governance in the Hebei-Shandong-Henan Border Region. He was promoted as a judge and worked on drafting laws in the 1950s. In 1957, he was Chief Judge of the criminal Supreme Court of the People's Republic of China. During the Hundred Flowers Campaign he criticized the party for interfering in the administration of justice. He was subsequently persecuted during the Anti-Rightist Campaign, but rehabilitated in 1961.
