= Reversible poem =

Poem that can be read both forwards and backwards

A reversible poem, also called a palindrome poem or a reverso poem, is a poem that can be read both forwards and backwards, with a different meaning in each direction, like this:

Example
Initial order	Reversed order
The world is doomed I cannot believe that We can save the world	We can save the world I cannot believe that The world is doomed

Reversible poems, called hui-wen shih poems, were a Classical Chinese artform. The most famous poet using this style was the 4th-century poet Su Hui, who wrote an untitled poem now called "Star Gauge" (Chinese: 璇璣圖; pinyin: xuán jī tú). This poem contains 841 characters in a square grid that can be read backwards, forwards, and diagonally, with new and sometimes contradictory meanings in each direction. Reversible poems in Chinese may depend not only on the words themselves, but also on the tone to produce a sense of poetry. Beginning in the 1920s, punctuation (which is uncommon in Chinese) was sometimes added to clarify Chinese palindromic poems.

English-speaking poets such as Marilyn Singer and Brian Bilston have also published reversible poems.

Reversible poems are sometimes taught to students as a way of showing differing perspectives within the same words. In English, omitting punctuation and placing line breaks strategically are useful writing techniques for creating a reversible poem.

== See also ==
- Retrograde verse
