= Prince of Jin (Ming dynasty) =

The Prince of Jin (Chinese: 晉王) was a princely peerage of China's Ming dynasty, created by the Hongwu Emperor for his third son, Zhu Gang.

== Generation poem ==
The generation poem given by the Hongwu Emperor was:

"济美钟奇表，知新慎敏求，审心咸景慕，述学继前修"
Ji Mei Zhong Qi Biao, Zhi Xin Shen Min Qiu, Shen Xin Xian Jing Mu, Shu Xue Ji Qian Xiu

The generation poem was used until "shen" (审) generation, which was the same generation as that of Tianqi Emperor and Chongzhen Emperor.

Generation poem
Generation	Kangxi Radical	Wu Xing element
Ji (济)	Radical 86 (火)	"Fire" (火)
Mei (美)	Radical 32 (土)	"Earth" (土)
Zhong (钟)	Radical 167 (金)	"Metal" (金)
Qi (奇)	Radical 85 (水)	"Water" (水)
Biao (表)	Radical 75 (木), Radical 187 (马)	"Tree" (木)
Zhi (知)	Radical 86 (火), Radical 195 (鱼)	"Fire" (火)
Xin (新)	Radical 32 (土), Radical 98 (瓦), Radical 109 (目)	"Earth" (土)
Shen (慎)	Radical 167 (金)	"Metal" (金)
Min (敏)	Radical 85 (水)	"Water" (水)
Qiu (求)	Radical 75 (木)	"Tree" (木)
Shen (审)	Radical 86 (火)	"Fire" (火)
Xin (心)	Radical 32 (土)	"Earth" (土)
Xian (咸)	Radical 167 (金)	"Metal" (金)
Jing (景)	Radical 85 (水)	"Water" (水)
Mu (慕)	Radical 75 (木)	"Tree" (木)
Shu (述)	Radical 86 (火)	"Fire" (火)
Xue (学)	Radical 32 (土)	"Earth" (土)
Ji (继)	Radical 167 (金)	"Metal" (金)
Qian (前)	Radical 85 (水)	"Water" (水)
Xiu (修)	Radical 75 (木)	"Tree" (木)

== Princedom of Jin ==
Zhu Gang's fief was located in Taiyuan Prefecture of Yushan (于山)

- Zhu Gang (朱棡; 18 December 1358 – 30 March 1398) (1st), Hongwu Emperor's third son. Posthumously honoured as Prince Gong of Jin (晋恭王)
  - Zhu Jixi (朱济熹; 19 May 1375 – 11 March 1435) (2nd), Zhu Gang's first son who held the princedom from 1398 until 1414 when he was stripped of his title. His title was restored with the posthumous name Prince Ding of Jin (晋定王)
    - Zhu Meigui (朱美圭; 1399-1441) (4th), Zhu Jixi's first son who held the princedom from 1435 until his death in 1441. He was posthumously honoured as Prince Xian of Jin (晋宪王)
      - Zhu Zhongxuan (朱钟铉; 1428-1502) (5th), Zhu Meigui's eldest son who held the princedom from 1441 until 1502 and was posthumously honoured as Prince Zhuang of Jin (晋庄王)
        - Zhu Qiyuan (朱奇源; 1450–1501), Zhu Zhongxuan's first son who was heir apparent since 1459. He was posthumously honoured as Prince Jing of Jin (晋靖王)
          - Zhu Biaorong (朱表荣; 1467–1493), Zhu Qiyuan's first son who held a title of Princely Grandson (世孙) until 1493 and was posthumously honoured as Prince Huai of Jin (晋怀王)
            - Zhu Zhiyang (朱知烊; 1489–1533) (6th), Zhu Biaorong's second son who inherited the title in 1503 and held it until 1533. He was posthumously honoured as Prince Duan of Jin (晋端王)
          - Zhu Biaoqian (朱表槏; d.1513), Zhu Qiyuan's second son who held a title of Prince of Xinhua (新化王) since 1510 and was posthumously honoured as Prince An of Jin (晋安王)
            - Zhu Zhijie (朱知㸅; d.1525), Zhu Biaoqian's first son who inherited the title of Prince of Xinhua and was posthumously honoured as Prince Kang of Jin (晋康王)
              - Zhu Xintian (朱新㙉; 1516–1575), Zhu Zhijie's first son who acted as clan councillor from 1533 to 1536 due to his nephew's prematurity and held the princedom from 1536 until 1575.
              - Zhu Xinque (朱新墧), Zhu Zhijie's second son who held a title of defender general. Posthumously honoured as Prince He of Jin (晋和王)
                - Zhu Shenjing (朱慎镜; d.1578), Zhu Xinque's first son who acted as clan councillor from 1576 until 1577 and was posthumously honoured as Prince Jing of Jin (晋敬王)
                  - Zhu Minyou (朱敏游; d.1578), Zhu Shenjing's first son who held the title in 1578 and was posthumously honoured as Prince Ai of Jin (晋哀王)
                - Zhu Shenzui (朱慎鋷; d.1579), Zhu Xinque's son who inherited the princedom in 1578 until 1579 and was posthumously honoured as Prince Hui of Jin (晋惠王)
                  - Zhu Minchun (朱敏淳; d.1610), Zhu Shenzui's first son who held the title from 1585 until 1610 and was posthumously honoured as Prince Mu of Jin (晋穆王)
                    - Zhu Qiugui (朱求桂; 1593–1630) (11th), Zhu Minchun's first son who held the princedom from 1613 to 1630 and was posthumously honoured as Prince Yu of Jin (晋裕王)
                      - Zhu Shenxuan (朱审烜; d.1644) (12th), Zhu Qiugui's son who was designated heir apparent in 1630 and held the princedom from 1635 to 1644 (晋王).
  - Zhu Jihuang (朱济熿; 14 September 1381 – 1427) (3rd), Zhu Gang's third son who held the princedom from 1414 until 1426 when he was deprived of his title and not given any posthumous name (晋废王)

== Cadet lines ==
=== Prince of Pingyang ===
- Zhu Jihuang (朱济熿; 14 September 1381 – 1427), Zhu Gang's third son who was granted the title in 1402 and held it until 1414, when he was given a princedom of Jin.
  - Zhu Meigui (朱美圭; 1399-1441), Zhu Jixi's first son and Zhu Jiguang's successor who held the title from 1423 to 1435 when he was transferred to Prince of Jin peerage.

=== Prince of Qingcheng ===
The peerage was created for Zhu Jixuan, Zhu Gang's fourth son. The fief was located in Fen Prefecture

- Zhu Jixuan (朱济炫; 4 February 1385 - 26 December 1429), Zhu Gang's fourth son who held the princedom from 1403 to 1429 and was posthumously honoured as Prince Zhuanghui of Qingcheng (庆成庄惠王)
  - Zhu Meiqing (朱美埥; 1408–1456), Zhu Jixuan's first son who held the princedom from 1432 until 1456 and was posthumously honoured as Prince Gongxi of Qingcheng (庆成恭僖王)
    - Zhu Zhongyi (朱钟镒; 1434–1496), Zhu Meiqing's first son who held the princedom from 1458 until 1496 and was posthumously honoured as Prince Wenmu of Qingcheng (庆成温穆王)
      - Zhu Qizhen (朱奇浈; 1450–1533), Zhu Zhongyi's first son who held the princedom from 1499 until 1533 and was posthumously honoured as Prince Duanshun of Qingcheng (庆成端顺王)
        - Zhu Biaoluan (朱表栾; 1469–1560), Zhu Qizhen's first son who held the princedom from 1535 until 1560 and was posthumously honoured as Prince Gongyu of Qingcheng (庆成恭裕王)
          - Zhu Zhilian (朱知熑; 1495–1569), Zhu Biaoluan's first son who held the princedom from 1562 until 1569 and was posthumously honoured as Prince Anmu of Qingcheng (庆成安穆王)
            - Zhu Xindi (朱新堤; d.1564), Zhu Zhilian's first son who held the title of hereditary prince (长子) and was posthumously honoured as Prince Daohuai of Qingcheng (庆成悼怀王)
              - Zhu Shenzhong (朱慎钟; 1544–1606), Zhu Xindi's first son who held the princedom from 1571 until 1606 and was posthumously honoured as Prince Rongyi of Qingcheng (庆成荣懿王)
                - Zhu Minni (朱敏𦰫; d.1609), Zhu Shenzhong's first son who held the princedom from 1608 to 1609 and was posthumously honoured as Prince Gonghe of Qingcheng (庆成恭和王)
                  - Zhu Qiulun (朱求棆), Zhu Minni's son who inherited the princedom in 1609.

=== Prince of Ninghua ===
The peerage was first created in1404 for Zhu Jihuan.

- Zhu Jihuan (朱济焕; 29 July 1387 - 1450), Zhu Gang's fifth son who held the princedom of Ninghua from 1404 until 1450 and was posthumously honoured as Prince Yijian of Ninghua (宁化懿简王)
  - Zhu Meirang (朱美壤; d.1471), Zhu Jihuan's first son who held the princedom from 1452 to 1471 and was posthumously honoured as Prince Xishun of Ninghua (宁化僖顺王)
    - Zhu Zhongbing (朱钟鈵; d. 1508), Zhu Meirang's second son who held the princedom from 1472 to 1491 and was not granted posthumous name (宁化王)
      - Zhu Qiyin (朱奇濦; d.1505), Zhu Zhongbing's first son who was posthumously honoured as Prince Daokang of Ninghua (宁化悼康王)
        - Zhu Biaochao (朱表樔, d.1570), Zhu Qiyin's first son who was appointed as clan councillor until 1529, held the princedom until 1570 and was posthumously honoured as Prince Kanghe of Ninghua (宁化康和王)
          - Zhu Zhiling (朱知爧, d.1585), Zhu Biaochao's first son who inherited the princedom in 1575, held it until 1585 and was posthumously honoured as Prince Gongduan of Ninghua (宁化康和王)
            - Zhu Xinlong (朱新垄, d.1593), Zhu Zhiling's first son who held the princedom from 1585 until 1593 and was posthumously honoured as Prince Zhuangding of Ninghua (宁化庄定王)
              - Zhu Shenpie (朱慎鐅, d. 1610), Zhu Xinlong's first son who held the princedom from 1593 until 1610 and was posthumously honoured as Prince Rongyi of Ninghua (宁化荣懿王)
                - Zhu Minji (朱敏济), Zhu Shenpie's first son who inherited the princedom in 1616 (宁化王).

=== Prince of Yonghe ===
The peerage was created for Zhu Jilang in 1403. The fief was located in Fenzhou, Shanxi.

- Zhu Jilang (朱济烺; 14 April 1388 - 12 March 1443), Zhu Gang's sixth son who held the princedom from 1403 until 1443 and was posthumously honoured as Prince Zhaoding of Yonghe (永和昭定王)
  - Zhu Meiwu (朱美坞; d. 1448), Zhu Jilang's first son who held the princedom from 1444 until 1448 when he was demoted to commoner status, summoned to the capital and died of reasons unknown
    - Zhu Zhongjia (朱钟鋏, d. 1474), Zhu Meiwu's second son who held the princedom from 1469 until 1474 and was posthumously honoured as Prince Shunxi of Yonghe (永和顺僖王)
      - Zhu Qiyu (朱奇淯, d. 1488), Zhu Zhongjia's first son who held the princedom from 1476 until 1488 and was posthumously honoured as Prince Ronghuai of Yonghe (永和荣怀王)
        - Zhu BiaoX (朱表X, d. 1518), Zhu Qiyu's first son who held the princedom from 1491 to 1518 and was posthumously honoured as Prince Jinghui of Yonghe (永和靖惠王)
          - Zhu Zhiyu (朱知燠, d.1549), Zhu BiaoX's first son who held the princedom from 1522 to 1549 and was posthumously honoured as Prince Anjian of Yonghe (永和安简王)
            - Zhu Xindong (朱新墥, d.1572), Zhu Zhiyu's first son who held the princedom from 1553 to 1572 and was posthumously honoured as Prince Zhuangding of Yonghe (永和庄定王).
              - Zhu Shenlei (朱慎镭, d.1598), Zhu Xindong's second son who held the princedom from 1572 to 1598 and was posthumously honoured as Prince Gongyi of Yonghe (永和恭懿王).
                - Zhu Minwa (朱敏漥, d. 1626), Zhu Shenlei's first son who held the princedom from 1598 to 1626 and was not given posthumous name (永和王)
                  - Zhu Qiuzhu (朱求柱), Zhu Minwa's first son who inherited the princedom in 1626 (永和王)

=== Prince of Guangchang ===
The peerage was created in 1402 for Zhu Jihe, Zhu Gang's seventh son. The fief was located in Taiyuan prefecture of Shanxi.

- Zhu Jihe (朱济熇; 12 August 1394 – 8 September 1427), Zhu Gang's seventh son who held the princedom of Guangchang from 1402 to 1427 and was posthumously honoured as Prince Daoping of Guangchang (广昌悼平王)
  - Zhu Meijian (朱美坚, d. 1454), Zhu Jihe's first son who held the princedom from 1433 to 1454 and was posthumously honoured as Prince Anxi of Guangchang (广昌安僖王). After his death, the princely title was abolished which meant that his successors would hold diminished ranks.
  - Zhu Meiyu (朱美堣, 1420–1480), Zhu Jixi's seventh son who held the princedom of Yunqiu from 1437 to 1480.
    - Zhu Zhongyu (朱钟䥏), Zhu Meiyu's second son who was adopted as Zhu Meijian's successor in 1454 and bestowed a title of defender general of Guangchang (广昌镇国将军).
      - Zhu Qidang (朱奇澢), Zhu Zhongyu's son who held the title of bulwark general of Guangchang (广昌辅国将军)
        - Zhu Biaohui (朱表桧), Zhu Qidang's son who held the title of supporter general of Guangchang (广昌奉国将军)
        - Zhu BiaoX (朱表X), Zhu Qidang's son
          - Zhu Zhimo (朱知㷬), Zhu BiaoX's son who held the title of defender lieutenant of Guangchang (广昌镇国中尉). Imprisoned for crime in 1558.

=== Prince of Jiaocheng ===
The peerage was created in 1437 for Zhu Meiyuan, Zhu Jixi's second son, with the fief located in Pingyang prefecture.

- Zhu Meiyuan (朱美垸; 1407–1476), Zhu Jixi's second son who held the princedom from 1437 to 1476 and was posthumously honoured as Prince Rongshun of Jiaocheng (交城荣顺王)
  - Zhu Zhongju (朱钟锯; d.1497), Zhu Meiyuan's first son who held the princedom from 1479 to 1497 and was posthumously honoured as Prince Zhuangxi of Jiaocheng (交城庄僖王)
    - Zhu Qichang (朱奇淐, d.1501), Zhu Zhongju's first son who held the princedom from 1499 to 1501 and was posthumously honoured as Prince Ronghui of Jiaocheng (交城荣惠王)
    - Zhu Qiyong (朱奇滽, d. 1491), Zhu Zhongju's third son who held the title of defender general until 1491 and was posthumously honoured as Prince Rongxi of Jiaocheng (交城荣僖王)
      - Zhu Biaofan (朱表杋, d. 1511), Zhu Qiyong's second son who held the princedom from 1510 to 1511 and was posthumously honoured as Prince Rongduan of Jiaocheng (交城荣端王). His succession was posthumously considered counterfeit
    - Zhu Qiyi (朱奇洢; d.1537), Zhu Zhongju's sixth son who held the title of defender general until 1537 and was posthumously honoured as Prince Gongjian of Jiaocheng (交城恭简王)
      - Zhu Biaoli (朱表𣐬, d. 1570), Zhu Qiyi's first son who was granted the title of bulwark general in 1547 and held the princedom until 1570. Having self-confessed his succession illegal, he was permitted to hold his princely title until his death, when the princedom would be abolished. Posthumously honoured as Prince Duanhe of Jiaocheng (交城端和王)
      - Zhu Biaojun (朱表棞)
        - Zhu Zhiru (朱知鱬), Zhu Biaoli's second son who was appointed a clan councillor

=== Prince of Yangqu ===
The peerage was created in 1437 for Zhu Meiguang, Zhu Jixi's third son with the fief located in Pingyang prefecture.

- Zhu Meiguang (朱美垙, 1409-1480), Zhu Jixi's third son who held the princedom from 1437 to 1480 and was posthumously honoured as Prince Rongjing of Yangqu (阳曲荣靖王)
  - Zhu Zhongfu (朱钟鍑, d. 1522), Zhu Meiguang's first son who held the princedom from 1481 to 1484 when he was stripped of his title. After his death, his successors were appointed as clan councillors which meant that the peerage was abolished
    - Zhu Qidong (朱奇洞, b. before 1477, d. before 1514), Zhu Zhongfu's second son, defender general
      - Zhu Biaowei (朱表㭏, d.1525), Zhu Qidong's son who was managing the affairs of the princedom from 1522 until 1525.
      - Zhu Biaoman (朱表槾), Zhu Biaowei's brother who was appointed as clan councillor in 1525
        - Zhu Zhiwu (朱知熃, d. 1544), Zhu Biaowei's son who was managing the affairs of the princedom until 1544 when he was executed for murder of his elder brother
        - Zhu Zhigou (朱知煹), Zhu Zhiwu's brother who was appointed as clan councillor in 1544
    - Zhu QiX
      - Zhu Biaozhu (朱表駯), Zhu QiX's son who was appointed as clan councillor in 1578 until 1587 when he was deprived of his official position.
        - Zhu Zhifen (朱知魵), Zhu Biaozhu's son who was appointed as clan councillor in 1589
          - Zhu Xindi (朱新堤), Zhu Zhifen's successor who was appointed as clan councillor in 1601
          - Zhu XinX (朱新X)
            - Zhu Shenyi (朱慎鉯), Zhu Xindi's successor who managed the affairs of the princedom from 1634
              - Zhu Mindu (朱敏渡, d.1646), Zhu Shenyi's successor who was granted a title of Prince of Yangqu (阳曲王) and held the princedom until 1646

=== Prince of Xihe ===
The peerage was created for Zhu Meizhun, Zhu Jixi's fourth son in 1435 with the fief located in Pingyang prefecture.

- Zhu Meizhun (朱美埻; 1411-1456), Zhu Jixi's fourth son who held the princedom from 1435 to 1456 and was posthumously honoured as Prince Jinggong of Xihe (西河靖恭王)
  - Zhu Zhongheng (朱钟鑅; d.1484), Zhu Meizhun's first son who held the princedom from 1457 to 1484 and was posthumously honoured as Prince Shunjian of Xihe (西河顺简王)
    - Zhu Qisu (朱奇溯, d.1558), Zhu Zhongheng's first son who held the princedom from 1491 to 1558 and was posthumously honoured as Prince Gongding of Xihe (西河恭定王)
      - Zhu Biaoxiang (朱表相, d. 1587), Zhu Qisu's first son who held the princedom from 1560 to 1587 and was posthumously honoured as Prince Kangyi of Xihe (西河康懿王)
        - Zhu Zhisui (朱知燧, d. 1597), Zhu Biaoxiang's first son who held the princedom from 1590 to 1597 and was not given posthumous name.
          - Zhu Xinzhen (朱新甄, d. 1644), Zhu Zhisui's first son who inherited the princedom in 1597 and was murdered by Li Zicheng in 1644
            - Zhu ShenX (朱慎X)
              - Zhu Mingan (朱敏淦), Zhu Xinzhen's successor who held the princedom from 1644 to 1646

=== Prince of Fangshan ===
The peerage was created for Zhu Meiyuan, Zhu Jixi's fifth son in 1437.

- Zhu Meiyuan (朱美垣; 1407-1470), Zhu Jixi's fifth son who held the princedom from 1437 to 1470 and was posthumously honoured as Prince Zhuangxian of Fangshan (方山庄宪王)
  - Zhu Zhongting (朱钟铤, d.1511), Zhu Meiyuan's first son who held the princedom from 1472 until 1480 when he was stripped of his title and was later posthumously honoured as Prince Zhaoxi of Fangshan (方山昭僖王) but rescinded in 1514
    - Zhu Qihuan (朱奇洹, d. before 1511), Zhu Zhongting's first son, defender general
      - Zhu Biaoluo (朱表欏, b. before 1494, d. after 1549), Zhu Qihuan's son, bulwark general, appointed as head of his clan after the death of his grandfather

=== Prince of Linquan ===
The peerage was created for Zhu Meiyong, Zhu Jixi's sixth son in 1437.

- Zhu Meiyong (朱美塎; 1420-1447), Zhu Jixi's sixth son who held the princedom from 1437 to 1447 and was posthumously honoured as Prince Zhuangjian of Linquan (临泉庄简王)
  - Zhu Zhongji (朱钟鏶; 1441-1469), Zhu Meiyong's first son who held the princedom from 1452 to 1469 and was posthumously honoured as Prince Daozhao of Linquan
    - Zhu Qiji (朱奇湒; 1462-1514), Zhu Zhongji's first son who held the princedom from 1472 to 1514 and was posthumously honoured as Prince Rongmu of Linquan (临泉荣穆王)
      - Zhu Biaoling (朱表柃; 1478-1521), Zhu Qiji's first son who held the title of defender general until 1521, however not posthumously honoured as Prince of Linquan (临泉王)
        - Zhu Zhichu (朱知炪, 1504-1520), Zhu Biaoling's first son who inherited the princedom in 1520 and was posthumously honoured as Prince Zhuangjing of Linquan (临泉庄靖王). After his childless death, the princely title was proclaimed as expired.
        - Zhu Zhiwei (朱知烓), Zhu Biaoling's second son who held the title of bulwark general of Linquan (临泉辅国将军) in 1520

=== Prince of Yunqiu ===
The peerage was created for Zhu Meiyu, Zhu Jixi's seventh son in 1442 with the fief located in Pingyang prefecture.

- Zhu Meiyu (朱美堣, 1420-1480), Zhu Jixi's seventh son who held the princedom from 1442 to 1480 and was posthumously honoured as Prince Jianjing of Yunqiu (云丘简靖王)
  - Zhu Zhongting (朱钟铤, d. 1496), Zhu Meiyu's first son who held the princedom from 1481 to 1496 and was posthumously honoured as Prince Duanhui of Yunqiu (云丘端惠王)
    - Zhu Qixuan (朱奇渲, d. 1518), Zhu Zhongting's fourth son who held the princedom from 1499 to 1518 and was posthumously honoured as Prince Gongxi of Yunqiu (云丘恭僖王)
      - Zhu Biaozhang (朱表樟, d.1526), Zhu Qixuan's first son who held the princedom from 1522 to 1526 and was posthumously honoured as Prince Shunrong of Yunqiu (云丘顺荣王). As he was sonless, his princedom was expired

=== Prince of Ninghe ===
The peerage was created for Zhu Meibi, Zhu Jixi's eighth son in 1437.

- Zhu Meibi (朱美堛; 1428-1486), Zhu Jixi's eighth son who held the princedom from 1437 until 1486 and was posthumously honoured as Prince Kangxi of Ninghe (宁河康僖王)
  - Zhu Zhonglou (朱钟镂, d. 1501), Zhu Meibi's ninth son who held the princedom from 1488 to 1501 and was posthumously honoured as Prince Anxian of Ninghe (宁河安宪王)
    - Zhu Qiyun (朱奇沄, d. 1559), Zhu Zhonglou's third son who held the princedom from 1508 to 1559 and was posthumously honoured as Prince Wenjian of Ninghe (宁河温简王)
      - Zhu Biaonan (朱表楠, d.1572), Zhu Qiyun's first son who held the princedom from 1561 to 1572 and was posthumously honoured as Prince Rongzhuang of Ninghe (宁河荣庄王)
        - Zhu Zhibing (朱知炳/朱知𢏅, d. 1592), Zhu Biaonan's first son who held the princedom from 1575 to 1592 and was posthumously honoured as Prince Gongyi of Ninghe (宁河恭懿王)
          - Zhu Xinya (朱新睚, d. 1598), Zhu Zhibing's / Zhu Zhishui's first son who held the princedom from 1595 to 1598 and was posthumously honoured as Prince Dinghui of Ninghe (宁河定惠王). The peerage was proclaimed extinct due to his childless death.

=== Prince of Hedong ===
The peerage was created in 1448 for Zhu Zhonghui, Zhu Meigui's third son.

- Zhu Zhongsui (朱钟鏸, d.1484), Zhu Meigui's third son who held the princedom from 1448 until 1484 and was posthumously honoured as Prince Zhaojing of Hedong (河东昭靖王)
  - Zhu Qihuai (朱奇淮, d. 1514), Zhu Zhongsui's first son who held the princedom from 1487 until 1514 and was posthumously honoured as Prince Rong'an of Hedong (河东荣安王)
    - Zhu Biaofang (朱表枋, d.1510), Zhu Qihuai's first son who held the title of bulwark general until 1510 and was posthumously honoured as Prince Gongxian of Hedong (河东恭宪王)
      - Zhu Zhijiong (朱知炯, d.1564), Zhu Biaofang's first son who held the princedom from 1514 until 1564 and was posthumously honoured as Prince Rongyi of Hedong (河东荣懿王)
        - Zhu Xintui (朱新墤, d. 1570), Zhu Zhijiong's first son who held the princedom from 1567 until 1570 and was posthumously honoured as Prince Duanmu of Hedong (河东端穆王)
          - Zhu Shenjian (朱慎键, d. 1602), Zhu Xintui's third son who held the princedom from 1575 to 1602 and was posthumously honoured as Prince Anyu of Hedong (河东安裕王)
            - Zhu Minhu (朱敏淴, d. 1606), Zhu Shenjian's first son who held the princedom from 1602 to 1606 (河东王)
              - Zhu Qiugai (朱求杚), Zhu Minhu's first son who inherited the princedom in 1606 (河东王)

=== Prince of Yining ===
The peerage was created in 1458 for Zhu Qiying, Zhu Zhongxuan's second son.

- Zhu Qiying (朱奇渶, d. 1496), Zhu Zhongxuan's second son who held the princedom from 1458 until 1496 and was posthumously honoured as Prince Rongkang of Yining (义宁荣康王)
  - Zhu Biaochen (朱表榇, 1469-1509), Zhu Qiying's first son who held the princedom from 1497 until 1509 and was posthumously honoured as Prince Xiyu of Yining (义宁僖裕王)
    - Zhu Zhihe (朱知焃, d. 1524), Zhu Biaochen's first son who held the princedom from 1512 until 1524 and was posthumously honoured as Prince Duanjing of Yining (义宁端靖王)
      - Zhu Xinting (朱新圢, d.1565), Zhu Zhihe's first son who held the princedom from 1532 to 1565 and was posthumously honoured as Prince Kangding of Yining (义宁康定王)
        - Zhu Shenshuo (朱慎铄, d. 1585), Zhu Xinting's first son who held the princedom from 1571 to 1585 and was posthumously honoured as Prince Anxi of Yining (义宁安僖王)
          - Zhu Minti (朱敏漽, d. 1610), Zhu Shenshuo's first son who held the princedom from 1588 to 1610 and was not given posthumous name (义宁王)
            - Zhu Qiuju (朱求橘), Zhu Minxi's first son who inherited the princedom in 1610 as Chief son of Yining (义宁长子).After his childless death, the peerage was expired.

=== Prince of Hezhong ===
The peerage was created for Zhu Qirong, Zhu Zhongxuan's third son, in 1465.

- Zhu Qirong (朱奇溶, d.1484), Zhu Zhongxuan's third son who held the princedom from 1465 to 1484 and was posthumously honoured as Prince Daohuai of Hezhong (河中悼怀王)
  - Zhu Biaopeng (朱表梈, d.1533), Zhu Qirong's first son who held the princedom from 1489 to 1533 and was posthumously honoured as Prince Kangjian of Hezhong (河中康简王)
    - Zhu Zhiju (朱知炬, d. 1590), Zhu Biaopeng's first son who held the princedom from 1535 to 1590 and was posthumously honoured as Prince Gongjing of Hezhong (河中恭靖王)
      - Zhi Xintu (朱新塗, d.1581), Zhu Zhiju's first son who held a title of defender general until 1582 and was posthumously honoured as Prince of Hezhong (河中王)
        - Zhu Shenbin (朱慎镔, d. 1614), Zhu Xintu's first son who held the princedom from 1594 to 1614 and was posthumously honoured as Prince Anxi of Hezhong (河中安僖王)
          - Zhu Minti (朱敏洟), Zhu Shenbin's first son who inherited the princedom in 1614 and was not given posthumous name

=== Prince of Xiangyin ===
The peerage was created in 1469 for Zhu Qiying, Zhu Zhongxuan's fourth son.

- Zhu Qiying (朱奇瀴, d.1496), Zhu Zhongxuan's fourth son who held the princedom from 1469 to 1496 and was posthumously honoured as Prince Anhui of Xiangyin (襄阴安惠王)
  - Zhu Biaojian (朱表楗, d. 1518), Zhu Qiying's first son who held the princedom from 1500 to 1518 and was posthumously honoured as Prince Xuanyi of Xiangyin (襄阴宣懿王). After his death, the peerage was proclaimed as expired.
  - Zhu BiaoX (朱表X)
    - Zhu Zhizhuo (朱知烛), Zhu Biaojian's successor who held the title of defender general of Xiangyin from 1521 (襄阴镇国将军)

=== Prince of Jing'an ===
The peerage was created for Zhu Biaozhi, Zhu Qiyuan's fourth son, in 1511.

- Zhu Biaozhi (朱表柣, d.1554), Zhu Qiyuan's fourth son who held the princedom from 1511 to 1554 and was posthumously honoured as Prince Duanxi of Jing'an (靖安端僖王)
  - Zhu Zhihun (朱知焝, d.1579), Zhu Biaozhi's first son who held the princedom from 1557 to 1579 and was posthumously honoured as Prince Gongyi of Jing'an (靖安恭懿王)
    - Zhu Xinhuai (朱新坏, d.1602), Zhu Zhihun's first son who held the princedom from 1582 to 1602 and was not given posthumous name (靖安王)
      - Zhu Shenyi (朱慎𨦯, d. 1610), Zhu Xinhuai's first son who held the title of chief son of Jing'an until his death in 1610 and was posthumously honoured as Prince of Jing'an (靖安王)
        - Zhu Minmei (朱敏没), Zhu Shenyi's first son who inherited the princedom in 1602 (靖安王)

=== Prince of Jingde ===
The peerage was created in 1510 for Zhu Biaozhi, Zhu Qiyuan's fifth son.

- Zhu Biaoyi (朱表榰, d.1531), Zhu Qiyuan's fifth son who held the princedom from 1510 to 1531 and was posthumously honoured as Prince Huaian of Jingde (旌德怀安王)
  - Zhu Zhi'ao (朱知熬, d. 1568), Zhu Biaozhi's first son who held the princedom from 1532 to 1568 and was posthumously honoured as Prince Rongmu of Jingde (旌德荣穆王)

=== Prince of Xingze ===
The peerage was created in 1511 for Zhu Biaohuan, Zhu Qiyuan's sixth son.

- Zhu Biaoxuan (朱表檈, d.1533), Zhu Qiyuan's sixth son who held the princedom from 1511 to 1533 and was posthumously honoured as Prince Anyi of Xingze (荥泽安懿王)
  - Zhu Zhihu (朱知𤎲, d.1549), Zhu Biaoxuan's first son who held the princedom from 1536 to 1549 and was posthumously honoured as Prince Duanjian of Xingze (荥泽端简王)

== Expired cadet lines ==
=== Absorbed into princedom ===
- Prince of Pingyang (平阳王)
- Prince of Yushe (榆社王)
- Prince of Xinhua (新华王)

=== Extinct ===
- Prince of Gaoping (高平王) - created for Zhu Jiye (朱济烨), Zhu Gang's second son who was posthumously honoured as Prince Huaijian of Gaoping (高平怀简王)
- Prince of Yunqiu (云丘王) - extinct with the death of Zhu Biaozhang in 1526
- Prince of Ninghe (宁河王) - extinct with the death of Zhu Xinya
- Prince of Wenxi (闻喜王) - created for Zhu Meixun
- Prince of Heshun (和顺王)
- Prince of Xugou (徐沟王)
- Prince of Taigu (太谷王)
- Prince of Yining (义宁王)
- Prince of Anxi (安溪王)
- Prince of Jingde (旌德王)
- Prince of Xingze (荥泽王)

=== Abolished ===
- Prince of Guangchang (广昌王) - expired in 1454 with the death of Zhu Meijian (朱美坚)
- Prince of Fangshan (方山王) - expired in 1480 with the death of Zhu Zhongting (朱钟铤)
- Prince of Linquan (临泉王) - expired in 1520 with the death of Zhu Zhichu (朱知炪)
- Prince of Xiangyin (襄阴王) - expired in 1518 with the death of Zhu Biaojian
