= Zhu Gang =

Chinese prince (1358–1398)

Zhu Gang 朱棡
- Prince of Jin
- Born: 18 December 1358
- Died: 30 March 1398 (aged 39)
Posthumous name
- Prince Gong of Jin (Note: Chinese: 晋恭王; pinyin: Jìn Gōngwáng)
- House: Zhu
- Father: Hongwu Emperor
- Mother: Empress Ma

Chinese name
- Chinese: 朱棡
Transcriptions
Standard Mandarin
- Hanyu Pinyin: Zhū Gāng

Zhu Gang (18 December 1358 – 30 March 1398) was an imperial prince of the Ming dynasty of China. He was the third son of the Hongwu Emperor, the Ming dynasty's founder.

== Biography ==
Zhu Gang was born on 18 December 1358, the third son of Zhu Yuanzhang and his first wife, Lady Ma. At the time, Zhu Yuanzhang was based in Nanjing and was a prominent rebel leader during the Red Turban Rebellion, an uprising in China against the Mongol-led Yuan dynasty. The rebellion sought to restore Han Chinese rule after decades of Mongol domination following the Yuan conquest of the Song in 1279. In 1368, Zhu Yuanzhang founded the Ming dynasty and became the Hongwu Emperor. In May 1370, the Emperor bestowed the title of prince (王; wang) on nine of his sons, including Zhu Gang, who became known as the Prince of Jin (晉王).

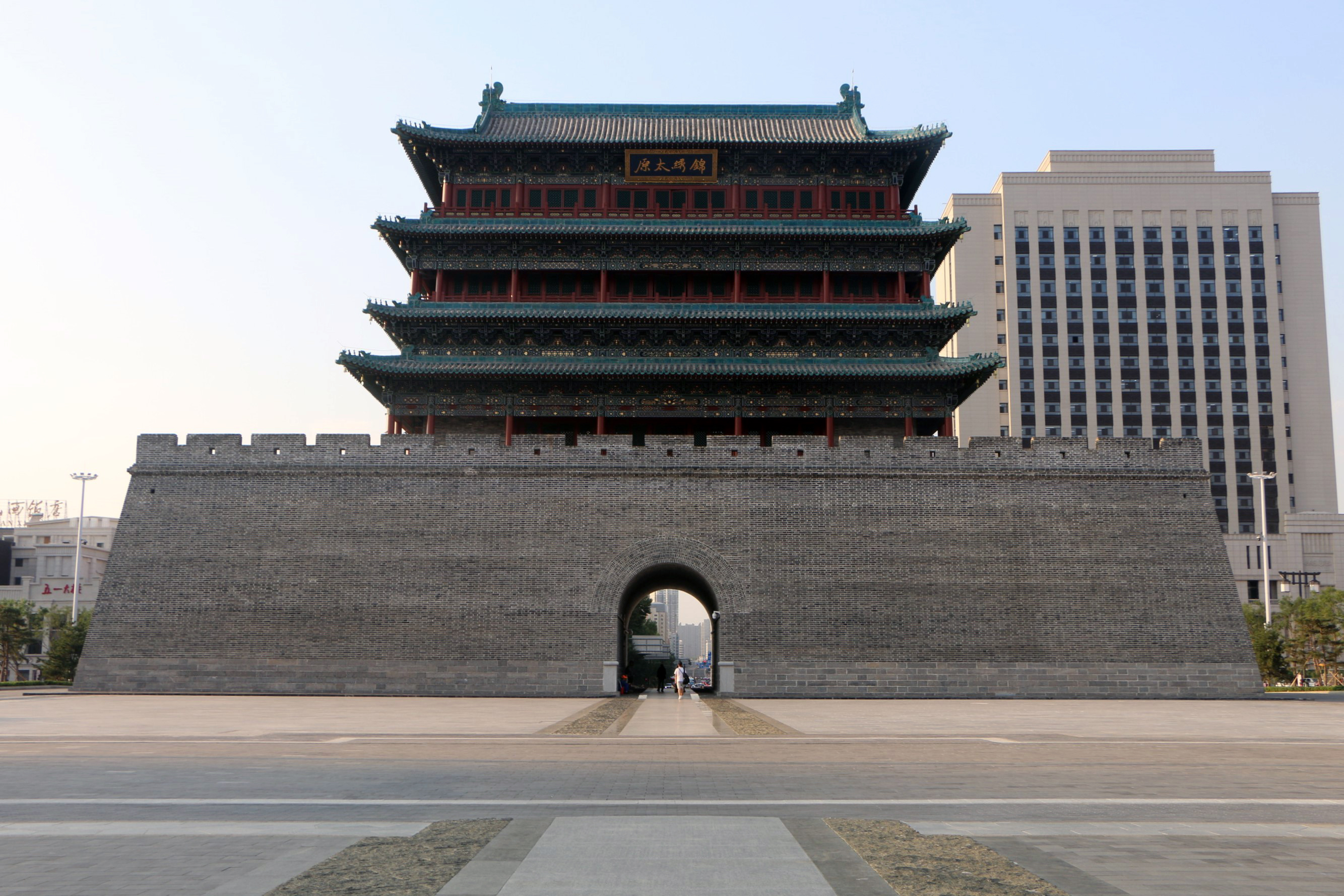
Reconstruction of a city gate in Taiyuan, the seat of Zhu Gang's princely fief

Upon reaching adulthood in 1378, Zhu Gang relocated to Taiyuan, the capital of Shanxi province. Although he lacked authority over the local administration, he wielded significant power through his personal guard, which comprised three regiments, and a large household headed by experienced advisers and officials. Motivated by a passion for the arts, he assembled a notable collection of paintings and calligraphy in his palace and supported Buddhist monasteries in the region.

During the late 1380s and early 1390s, he was one of several of the emperor's sons assigned responsibility for the northern and northwestern frontiers. After the purges of the early 1390s, he took over command of the frontier armies alongside Zhu Di and his younger brothers, the princes of Qi, Chu, Liao, and Xiang, among others.

He fell ill in 1398 and died on 30 March that year. He left seven sons and three daughters, and his descendants held the title Prince of Jin until 1648.

== Notes ==
Zhu Gang House of Zhu Born: 18 December 1358 Died: 30 March 1398
Chinese royalty
New creation	Prince of Jin; 1370–1398	Succeeded by Zhu Jixi
