= Hundred Flowers Campaign =

1956–57 Chinese liberalization campaign

- Simplified Chinese: 百花齐放
- Traditional Chinese: 百花齊放
Transcriptions
Standard Mandarin
- Hanyu Pinyin: Bǎihuā Qífàng
- Wade–Giles: Pai^{3}-hua^{1} Ch'i^{2}-fang^{4}
- IPA: [pàɪ.xwá tɕʰǐ.fâŋ]
Yue: Cantonese
- Yale Romanization: Baakfāa Chàihfong
- Jyutping: Baak3-faa1 Cai4-fong3
- IPA: [pak̚˧.fa˥ tsʰɐj˩.fɔŋ˧]

The Hundred Flowers Campaign, also known as the Hundred Flowers Movement (Chinese: 百花齊放; pinyin: Bǎihuā Qífàng) and the Double Hundred Movement (雙百方針; Shuāngbǎi Fāngzhēn), was a period from 1956 to 1957 in the People's Republic of China (PRC) during which the Chinese Communist Party (CCP), led by Mao Zedong, proposed to "let a hundred flowers bloom in social science and arts and let one hundred points of view be expressed in the field of science." The movement was in part a response to tensions between the CCP and Chinese intellectuals. It encouraged citizens to offer criticism and advice to the government and the party. From the Maoist perspective, the campaign was intended to serve an anti-bureaucratic purpose. The campaign was a relaxation in ideological and cultural policy, and it resulted in an increase of advice and criticism directed at the Party and its policies by those outside its rank.

As criticism increased, the Communist Party began to view it as a threat. A subsequent suppression of criticism developed into the Anti-Rightist Campaign, re-imposing Maoist orthodoxy in public expression.

== The campaign ==
The Hundred Flowers campaign was a period of relaxation in PRC ideological and cultural policy. Mao Zedong proposed to "let one hundred flowers bloom in social science and arts and let one hundred points of view be expressed in the field of science."

The campaign allowed citizens to offer criticism and advice to the government and the party; hence it was intended to serve an antibureaucratic purpose, at least on the Maoists' part. The campaign resulted in a groundswell of criticism aimed at the Party and its policies by those outside its ranks.

=== Naming ===
The name of the movement consists two parts. The first part, "Let a hundred flowers bloom," is from the Qing-era novel Flowers in the Mirror by Li Ruzhen; the second part, "Let a hundred schools of thought contend," comes from Treatise on Literature of the Book of Han authored by the Chinese historian Ban Gu:

百花齊放，百家爭鳴
(Bǎihuā qífàng, bǎijiā zhēngmíng)

Translation:

Let a hundred flowers bloom; let a hundred schools of thought contend.

In the context of the campaign, the origin of the phrase "let a hundred flowers bloom" has been traced to Ministry of Culture figure Zhou Yang who used it in 1951; he may have picked up the phrase from a discussion on Peking opera.

In April 1956, Mao stated that "let a hundred flowers bloom" would be the policy for all arts and sciences. The name was used to arouse the interest of China's intellectuals, referring to the Warring States period when numerous schools of thought competed for ideological, not military, supremacy. Historically, Confucianism, Chinese Buddhism and Taoism had gained prominence, and socialism would now face its test. At the time, the movement was opposed by even some of Mao's most devout followers, as well as some within the academic circle, most notably, Guo Moruo.

Along with the idea of a hundred flowers blooming, other recurring metaphors in newspapers, essays, poetry, and big-character posters included "fragrant flowers", "poisonous weeds", "light wind and fine rain", and others.

Popular slogans in the campaign included "the speaker has no guilt" and "tell all, leave nothing unsaid."

=== Background ===
In March 1951, the Peking Opera Research Institute was considered to be expanded and established as the Chinese Opera Research Institute. Mao was invited to inscribe a dedication for the institute. Meanwhile, half of the people argued that Peking Opera is outdated and that revolutionary opera should be promoted. In late March, Mao inscribed a dedication for the establishment of the Chinese Opera Research Institute: "Let a hundred flowers bloom; weed through the old to bring forth the new." Various parties began to use the phrase after its became popular in the context of opera reform; many of these parties used the phrase to call for a pluralistic policy across other artistic fields.

In 1953, Boda Chen, who was in charge of the Committee for the Study of Chinese Historical Issues, sought Mao's guidance on the work principles, to which Chairman Mao responded with four characters: "Let a hundred schools of thought contend."

Until April 1956, in a speech at an expanded meeting of the Politburo of the Chinese Communist Party, Mao Zedong said:

In the arts, "a hundred flowers bloom together"; in science, "a hundred schools contend" - the hundred schools contending of the Spring and Autumn [period] and the Warring States -- this should be our policy, this is the opinion of the people from 2,000 years ago.

Throughout the first half of the 1950s, Chinese intellectuals had been treated as one of the "black classes", hostile or at best lukewarm to the Chinese Communist Revolution. There were targeted attacks on intellectuals and their works and efforts were made by the communists to bring them into line. Mao, during a Central Government meeting, even ridiculed liberal thinker Liang Shuming as a "reactionary" and an "ambitious schemer" after Liang dared to criticize the communists for the heavy taxation of peasants. In the second half of 1955, when prominent Marxist writer and literary theorist Hu Feng expressed opposition to the Party's rigid, state-controlled policies on literature and art, a political purge was launched which resulted in the implication and imprisonment of dozens of Chinese intellectuals.

It is suggested that the launching of the campaign was delayed by the shocking impact of the speech denouncing Stalin at the Twentieth Soviet Party Congress in February 1956 delivered by Nikita Khrushchev.

The movement was in part a response to tensions between the CCP and Chinese intellectuals.

=== Launch (early 1956 – early 1957) ===
In the opening stage of the movement, issues discussed were relatively minor and unimportant in the grand scheme. Emphasis was placed on a distinction being drawn between "friend and foe". Intellectuals approached the campaign with suspicion, due to a lack of guidelines on what speech was acceptable; few also had suspicions about whether the campaign was bait, and whether disallowed speech would get them in trouble. As a result, the Central Government did not receive much criticism, although there was a significant rise in letters of conservative advice. Premier Zhou Enlai received some of these letters, and once again realized that, although the campaign had gained notable publicity, it was not progressing as had been hoped. Zhou approached Mao about the situation, stating that more encouragement was needed from the central bureaucracy to lead the intellectuals into further discussion. Mao Zedong found the concept interesting and superseded Zhou to take control. Guo Moruo declared that the contending of diverse schools should be guided by the central aim of building a socialist society.

The idea was to have intellectuals discuss the country's problems to promote new forms of arts and new cultural institutions. Mao also saw this as the chance to promote socialism, believing that after discussion it would be apparent that socialist ideology was the dominant ideology over capitalism, even amongst non-communist Chinese, and would thus propel the development and spread of the goals of socialism. To this end, in an attempt to reduce hesitancy, intellectuals were invited to forums in which they were allowed to ask exploratory questions, slowly discovering what was deemed acceptable speech. During this time, criticisms were often indirect and lauded the Hundred Flowers campaign itself. In Lekner's research, it is stated that the conventional understanding of communication and power is inverted during the campaign since the right to speak up and be heard was not the right reserved for those in powers, but the right to keep one's voice out of the unfolding campaign. In other words, students were pressured by teachers to speak out; inferiors were asked to speak by superiors. Within Chinese society, there were visible relaxation of restrictions on traditional Chinese clothing and Western music.

Criticisms became more specific in May 1956, citing the regimentation of education, thought reforms in previous years that were described as "painful", and the lack of employment prospects for those who went to American and British scholars. Additionally, some recanted their self-criticism and confessions from previous years.

A wave of literary journals were launched or re-launched during the campaign, including the PRC's first state-supported poetry journal, Stars.

There were also opposition to liberalization, as conservative elements in the Party and Army were outraged at the resurgence of traditional literary forms at the expense of socialist realism and that the principle of art serving politics was being breached by the liberalization. However, Mao was unbothered by the criticisms, and even told a Party conference in January 1957 that writings hostile to Marxism should be openly published in order to find ways to refute it, a comment he later backtracked. Mao declared that it was "wrong to quarantine things" and that it was better to "vaccinate" the masses by exposing them to harmful ideas, comments that underwhelmed the delegates who were responsible for managing the fallout.

At the close of the January 1957 conference (which was held for municipal, autonomous region, and provincial party secretaries), Mao stated:

It is the fragrant flower that must contend fiercely for the position of leadership; overturning all that stinks is no good. There's no harm in poisonous weeds occupying a secondary position. It's like the CPC is primary and the Democratic League is secondary. It's like atoms and electrons. The atom, though small, is very heavy; to split the atom one requires the power of many locomotives. The electrons surrounding the nucleus, on the other hand, are very light, they are liberal, but without the atom there is nothing. This is unity through opposition.

In his 27 February 1957 On the Correct Handling of Contradictions Among the People, Mao suggested that the Communist Party should be open to criticism from those outside its ranks. Mao wrote that even ideas that are initially viewed as "poisonous weeds" by society may ultimately be found correct:

To determine whether something is right or wrong frequently takes a trial period. In history, new and correct things often could not win recognition from the majority of people at the start, and they had to move forward by twists and turns in struggle. People tend to deny correct things, good things, as fragrant flowers from the outset; instead they regard them as poisonous weeds. Copernicus' theory of the solar system and Darwin's theory of evolution were both regarded at one time as erroneous, and both experienced bitter struggle.

Politically contested literary works of the Hundred Flowers period included Wang Meng's A Newcomer at the Organizational Department and Liu Shahe's Pieces on Plants. Mao referenced both pieces throughout his speeches in February and March 1957. Mao stated that Pieces on Plants was a "poisonous weed" that should be criticized, but that "even with a hundred Pieces on Plants there would be no chaos."

=== Escalation of criticism (Spring 1957) ===
By the spring of 1957, Mao had announced that criticism was "preferred" and had begun to mount pressure on those who did not turn in healthy criticism on policy to the Central Government. However, lower and middle-ranked party officials were initially hostile to the anti-bureaucrat campaign and Mao had to dissuade Party officials' concerns by stating that the "blooming and contending" would not be permitted to produce "disorganization and confusion". Mao then mounted a persuasion campaign to convince non-communist intellectuals, promising that they would be given genuine positions of authority and power in order to harness their expertise to help build a stronger socialist China. The reception was immediate with intellectuals, who began voicing concerns without any taboo and against their better judgements. In the period from 1 May to 7 June that year, millions of letters were pouring into the Premier's Office and other authorities. Local Party officials were also under pressure to ensure the campaign was a success.

From May to June 1957, newspapers published a huge range of critical articles. The majority of these critiques argued that the Party had become less revolutionary and more bureaucratic, which had resulted in the monopolization of power and privilege and alienated from the masses. There were also criticisms of the Party's mistreatment of intellectuals that resulted in self-censorship. Nonetheless, most of the commentary was premised on complete acceptance of socialism and the legitimacy of the Communist Party and focused on making the existing socialist system work better.

Criticism increasingly arose from Chinese citizens of varying backgrounds. Peasants criticized the effectiveness of cooperatives and demanded the repossession of their land. Workers argued that the wage system was irrational and complained about the requirement to work overtime without pay. Some individuals even argued that the people were better off under the administration of the Nationalist KMT. There were calls by some within the ethnic minorities in China to secede from China to form independent states.

Others spoke out by putting up posters around campuses, rallying in the streets, holding meetings for CCP members, and publishing magazine articles. A journalist wrote that the party became alienated from the masses and that its members had become "flatterers, sycophants, and yes-men". One professor mentioned that Marx and Lenin had repeatedly revised their theories and suggested that the two would be displeased if they had seen how strictly the CCP leaders were applying doctrine. Students at Peking University created a "Democratic Wall" on which they severely criticized the CCP with posters and letters that openly discussed multi-party elections, the merits of capitalism and condemned the Party of practicing "feudal socialism" and urged sweeping reforms.

They protested CPC control over intellectuals, the harshness of previous mass campaigns such as that against counter-revolutionaries, the slavish following of Soviet models, the low standards of living in China, the proscription of foreign literature, economic corruption among party cadres, and the fact that "Party members [enjoyed] many privileges which make them a race apart".

In other universities across the country, student leaders openly called for an end to Communist rule, teachers who were inspired by their students' bluntness began to criticize Mao's rule as "arbitrary and reckless" while others spoke openly of a "malevolent tyranny that employed the fascist methods of Auschwitz" and faulted the Party leadership for the lack of democracy in China.

== End of the campaign and subsequent crackdown ==
In mid-May 1957, Mao Zedong wrote an essay titled The Situation is Changing and circulated it among Communist Party leaders. Academic Dayton Lekner observes that the essay marked a change in Mao's tone in his discourse on the Hundred Flowers campaign: "Gone was the equanimity about 'poisonous weeds' and encouragement to air views. In their place came a stark division between left and right." Mao wrote that Rightists were attempting to take back the cultural, scientific, and educational spheres, and that the major struggle was between "Rights and ourselves."

On June 8, 1957, the Party newspaper, People's Daily, published an editorial that signaled the conclusion of the Hundred Flowers Campaign. The editorial, titled Why Is This So?, labeled the previous "airing of views" as an attack by "Rightists." The editorial claimed, amounted to a hostile struggle "between the enemy and the people", indicating the beginning of a crackdown that later became the Anti-Rightist Campaign led by then party General Secretary Deng Xiaoping. Mao then announced that "poisonous weeds" had grown amongst the "fragrant flowers" of the campaign, further terminology which signified the impeding crackdown. Mao had already expressed private dissatisfaction at the direction of the campaign in mid-May 1957, stating in a secret memorandum that there were "revisionists" who had denied the class nature of the press, expressed admiration of bourgeois liberalism and democracy, rejected Party leadership and even worked closely with right-wing intellectuals (rightists) to create these "spate of wild attacks", declaring them as a "main danger" within the Party.

In a revised version of On the Correct Handling of Contradictions Among the People, an essay aimed to revive the Hundred Flowers campaign openly published on June 19, 1957, Mao Zedong clarified the distinction between "beautiful flowers" and "poisonous weeds";

1. Whether they would help to unite the people of various nationalities.
2. Whether they were beneficial or harmful to socialism.
3. Whether they would consolidate or weaken the people's democratic dictatorship.
4. Whether they would consolidate democratic centralism.
5. Whether they would strengthen or weaken the leadership of the Communist Party of China.
6. Whether they would strengthen our "international socialist solidarity". Later in this version of the speech, "international socialist solidarity" was defined as "To strengthen our solidarity with the Soviet Union, to strengthen our solidarity with all socialist countries - this is our fundamental policy, herein lies our basic interest."

In June and July, the Party halted the campaign with Mao's support, and the Anti-Rightist Campaign was launched, partly as a corrective. The first targets were the leaders of the China Democratic League, Luo Longji and Zhang Bojun, both of whom were accused of forming a "counter-revolutionary alliance to promote an anti-communist bourgeois line". Unexpected demands for power sharing led to the abrupt change of policy. By that time, Mao had witnessed Nikita Khrushchev denouncing Joseph Stalin and the Hungarian Revolution of 1956, events which he felt were threatening. In essence, Mao was threatened by the intellectuals efforts to reclaim the position as loyal guardians of the proper moral framework for the political system.

The campaign made a lasting impact on Mao's ideological perception. Mao, who is known historically to be more ideological and theoretical, while being less pragmatic and practical, continued to attempt to solidify socialist ideals in future movements in a more stringent manner, and in the case of the Cultural Revolution, employed more violent means. Another consequence of the Hundred Flowers Campaign was that it discouraged dissent and made intellectuals reluctant to criticize Mao and his party in the future. The Anti-Rightist Movement that shortly followed, and was caused by the Hundred Flowers Campaign, resulted in the persecution of intellectuals, officials, students, artists, and dissidents labeled "rightists". The campaign led to a loss of individual rights, especially for any Chinese intellectuals educated in Western centers of learning. The campaign was conducted indiscriminately, as numerous individuals were labeled as "rightists" based on anonymous denunciations. Local officials across the country were even assigned quotas for the number of "rightists" they needed to identify and denounce within their units. In the summer and early fall of 1957, roughly four hundred thousand urban residents, including many intellectuals, were branded as rightists and either sent to penal camps or forced into labor in the countryside. While the party attempted to improve relations with intellectuals at the end of the Great Leap Forward, the Cultural Revolution obliterated any semblance of intellectual influence and prestige, "very few, if any, intellectuals survived the Cultural Revolution without having suffered physical and psychological abuse".

== Intent of the campaign ==
The academic consensus is that Mao's intent in the Hundred Flowers Campaign (and the rectification campaign that followed it) was to avoid the social and political upheaval of a Hungarian crisis-style scenario and to further incorporate intellectuals into the PRC's project of socialist construction. Earlier views that the campaigns were a "hidden plot" by Mao to draw out opponents have been rejected by subsequent scholarship.

Historian Jonathan Spence suggests that the campaign was the culmination of a muddled and convoluted dispute within the Party regarding how to address dissent.

Academic Dayton Lekner writes, "Mao genuinely believed the majority of China's intellectuals to be in full support of socialism and of his leadership, feared a retrogressive bureaucratic streak, and sought to temper the latter with the former." Lekner describes the movement's causes as "complex and interlocking," citing factors including the appropriation of the "let a hundred flowers bloom, drive out the old and usher in the new" slogan from the context of opera reform to broader calls for pluralism in the arts, the impact of the Khrushchev thaw on Soviet cultural circles, and the impact of the Hungarian and Polish uprisings. According to Lekner, "At each of these moments, Mao and central leadership were responding to and capturing cultural and intellectual sea changes, certainly seeking control (as well as the all-important appearance of control) but working within a limited range of options delimited by such waters."

In Mao: The Unknown Story by Jung Chang and Jon Halliday, Chang asserts that "Mao was setting a trap, and ... was inviting people to speak out so that he could use what they said as an excuse to victimise them." Prominent critic Harry Wu, who as a teenager was a victim, later wrote that he "could only assume that Mao never meant what he said, that he was setting a trap for millions". A letter arguably written by Mao indicates that the campaign was a ploy for entrapment from the beginning. Circulated to higher party cadres in mid-May 1957, the letter stated:

Things are just beginning to change. The rightist offensive has not yet reached its peak. [The rightists] are still very enthusiastic. We want to let them rage for a while and climb to the very summit.

In a July 1, 1956 editorial, Mao wrote:

Some say this is a conspiracy. We say this is an open strategy. Because we informed the enemy in advance: only by allowing the monsters and demons to come out of their lairs can we exterminate them; only by letting the poisonous weeds emerge from the ground can we easily uproot them. Don't farmers weed several times a year? Weeds, once removed, can still be used as fertilizer. Class enemies will inevitably seek opportunities to express themselves. They are unwilling to accept the downfall of the nation and the rise of communism.

Academic research concludes that Mao's assertions that he was "drawing snakes from their holes" and luring out opponents were actually retrospective attempts by Mao to appear more in control than he in fact was.

Professor Lin Chun characterizes as a "conspiracy theory" the depiction of the Hundred Flowers campaign as a calculated trap. In her analysis, this depiction is disputed by empirical research from archival sources and oral histories. She writes that many interpretations of the Hundred Flowers campaign "underestimate the fear on the part of Mao and party leadership over an escalating atmosphere of anticommunism within the communist world in the aftermath of the East European uprisings".

Author Christine Vidal similarly rejects the idea of the campaign as being initially calculated to lure dissidents for later repression, stating that "the repression was not the initial aim of Mao and of his Hundred Flowers policy".

Mao's personal physician, Li Zhisui, suggested that:

[The campaign was] a gamble, based on a calculation that genuine counter-revolutionaries were few, that rebels like Hu Feng had been permanently intimidated into silence, and that other intellectuals would follow Mao's lead, speaking out only against the people and practices Mao himself most wanted to subject to reform.

Biographer Philip Short argued that additional factors were pushing the Party towards liberalization, mainly the shortage of skilled manpower (scientists and engineers), which was blocking Mao's plan to speed up economic development, and the effects of Khrushchev's Secret Speech, which convinced Mao to avoid the wholesale copy of the Soviet model. The 1956 revolts in Poland and Hungary had led Mao to conclude that bureaucrats in communist states were beginning to become estranged from the masses, thereby saw the need for a rectification campaign to provide a safety valve for popular discontent. Short argued that contrary to the popular belief that Mao had set up a trap for intellectuals, Mao had always distrusted intellectuals since his time in Yan'an and believed from the outset that there would always be some cases of "extremists" transgressing reasonable bounds, who would have to be uprooted. Mao instead wanted the intellectuals to willingly shift their allegiance to the communists, given that the "ideological superstructure" should follow suit after the 1949 revolution and that if Mao had indeed set up a trap, Mao likely reckoned that these "extremists" would be falling into it on their own accord. Instead the campaign had caught Mao off-guard, having underestimated the scale and harshness of the criticisms and the Party cadres ability to address them. In speeches made after the campaign came to an abrupt end, Mao made clear that he continued to believe that the original policy had been correct, but claimed that he had been "confused by false appearances", evidence which Short pointed out that Mao's formula, in practice, had proven utterly self-defeating and instead led intellectuals henceforth to abandon all support for Mao and the Communist Party.

== Legacy ==
In addition to shaping practices in writing, the campaign also led to a proliferation in flower-focused visual design and art.

Earlier analysis of the campaign tended to emphasize a clear division between intellectuals as victims of the campaign and the party-state as perpetrator. Summarizing more recent scholarship, academic Dayton Lekner writes, "[T]he picture of the campaigns that pit intellectuals against the state has gradually been replaced by one in which clear and fixed allegiances, ideologies, or lines between victims and perpetrators or liberal intellectuals and the state have become increasingly elusive."

Prominent party figures' attitudes toward the campaign showed divided opinion on leadership level within the party on the issue of corruption among the party officials. As Lieberthal writes, "The Chairman…in the Hundred Flowers campaign and in the Cultural Revolution, proved willing to bring in non-party people as part of his effort to curb officiousness by cadres. Other leaders, such as Liu Shaoqi, opposed "rectifying" the party by going outside of its ranks."

Another important issue of the campaign was the tension that surfaced between the political center and national minorities. With criticism allowed, some of the minorities' activists made public their protest against Han chauvinism which they saw the informal approach of party officials toward the local specifics.

=== CCP's internal perception towards the campaign ===
The party's internal attitude towards the campaign can be found in Resolution on Certain Questions in the History of Our Party since the Founding of the People's Republic of China:

The economic task in 1957, due to the serious implementation of the correct policies of the Party's "Eighth National Congress", was one of the most effective years since the founding of the country. This year, the entire Party launched the Rectification Campaign, mobilizing the masses to criticize and offer suggestions to the Party. This was a normal step in promoting socialist democracy. During the Rectification process, a very small number of bourgeois rightists took the opportunity to advocate for so-called "big revelations and big debates", launching a brazen attack on the Party and the new socialist system, attempting to replace the leadership of the Communist Party. It was entirely correct and necessary to firmly counteract this attack. However, the Anti-Rightist Campaign was seriously expanded, misclassifying a group of intellectuals, patriots, and Party cadres as "rightists", resulting in unfortunate consequences.

== See also ==
- List of campaigns of the Chinese Communist Party
- Cultural Revolution
- Great Leap Forward
- History of the People's Republic of China
- Criticism and self-criticism
