= Classical Chinese poetry genres =

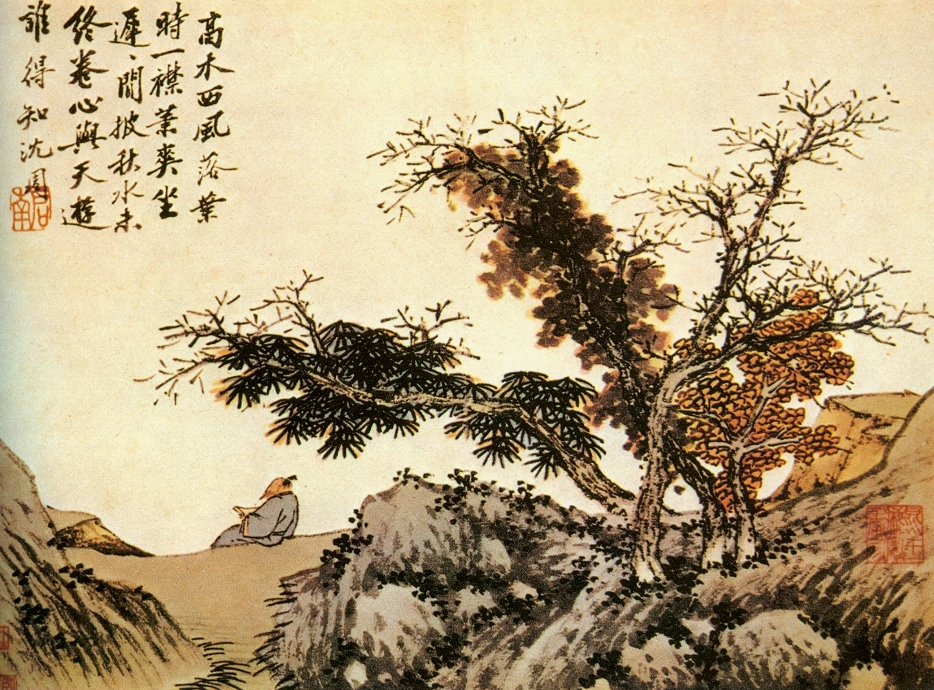
Reading in Autumn Scenery, Palace Museum, Beijing by Shen Zhou, about 1500 CE (Ming dynasty).

Classical Chinese poetry genres are those genres which typify the traditional Chinese poems written in Classical Chinese. Some of these genres are attested to as early as the publication of the Classic of Poetry, dating from a traditionally, and roughly, estimated time of around 11th–7th century BCE, in what is now China, but at that time was composed of various independent states. The term "genres" refers to various aspects, such as to topic, theme, and subject matter, what similes or metaphors were considered appropriate or how they would be interpreted, and other considerations such as vocabulary and style. These genres were generally, but not always independent of the Classical Chinese poetry forms. Many or most of these forms and genres were developed by the Tang dynasty, and the use and development of Classical Chinese poetry genres actively continued up until the May Fourth Movement, in 1919, and still continues even today in the 21st century.

== Landscape style poetry genre ==
Similarly to the classification of Chinese painting, some poetry is regarded as "landscape poetry", because it primarily utilizes images of scenes of nature. Some of the genesis of this can be seen in the nature imagery of the Shijing. Also, the Orchid Pavilion Gathering was an important influence in this regard. Similarly, this genre may be divided into two subgenres: the more domestic nature poetry of the "Fields and Gardens" genre and the more completely untrammeled nature encountered in the "Rivers and Mountains" (shansui shi). The landscape style of poetry also developed an impetus through a happy conjoining with similar generic developments in Chinese painting such as the Shan shui style.

=== Rivers and Mountains (山水) ===
The Rivers and Mountains or shanshui style or genre of poetry involves or depicts naturalistic images or settings. Mountains, rivers and often waterfalls are prominent in this art form. The direct focus of this poetry tends to be explicitly on the scene itself, rather than the human elements or viewer(s) of the scene. One of the greatest exemplars of this type of poetry was Wang Wei.

=== Fields and Gardens (田園) ===
Although the Fields and Gardens style or genre of poetry involves depictions of naturalistic images or settings like the Mountains and Rivers genre, the settings and specifics are more oriented to the cultivated countryside and the domesticated garden. Tao Qian, also known as Tao Yuanming, wrote poems exemplifying this form.

== Frontier Fortress (邊塞, 出塞, or 塞下曲) ==
"Border Fortress" (traditional Chinese: 邊塞; simplified Chinese: 边塞; pinyin: biānsài), but also known by other names such as "Beyond the Borders", this genre of Classical Chinese poetry deals with the experiences – real or imagined – of life on the edge of the Chinese empire. They are set especially in the arid regions to the North and West, which were remote, subject to temperature extremes and to sand and dust storms, and populated with sometimes exotic and often hostile people. Yet these frontier areas were vital to the empire: politically due to imperial ambitions, economically due to the Silk Road trade, and symbolically. Important poets who wrote in this genre include Gao Shi and Cen Shen, both of the Tang dynasty.

== Gufeng ==
Gufeng (古風), literally "ancient airs" are a Chinese poetry genre based on the "Airs (feng) from the Kingdoms (States)" section of the Shijing. Examples include Li Bai's gufeng on Mount Taibai; Li Bai also wrote a poem entitled 古風.

== Huaigu, recalling the past ==
One widespread genre is known as Huaigu (traditional Chinese: 懷古; simplified Chinese: 怀古; pinyin: huáigǔ). In this type of poem, the poet looks back at some bygone time, place, or persons. This is "one of the perennial themes of Chinese poetry," according to Burton Watson, in which "the poet contemplates the ruins of past glory."

== Huiwen, "palindrome" poem style ==
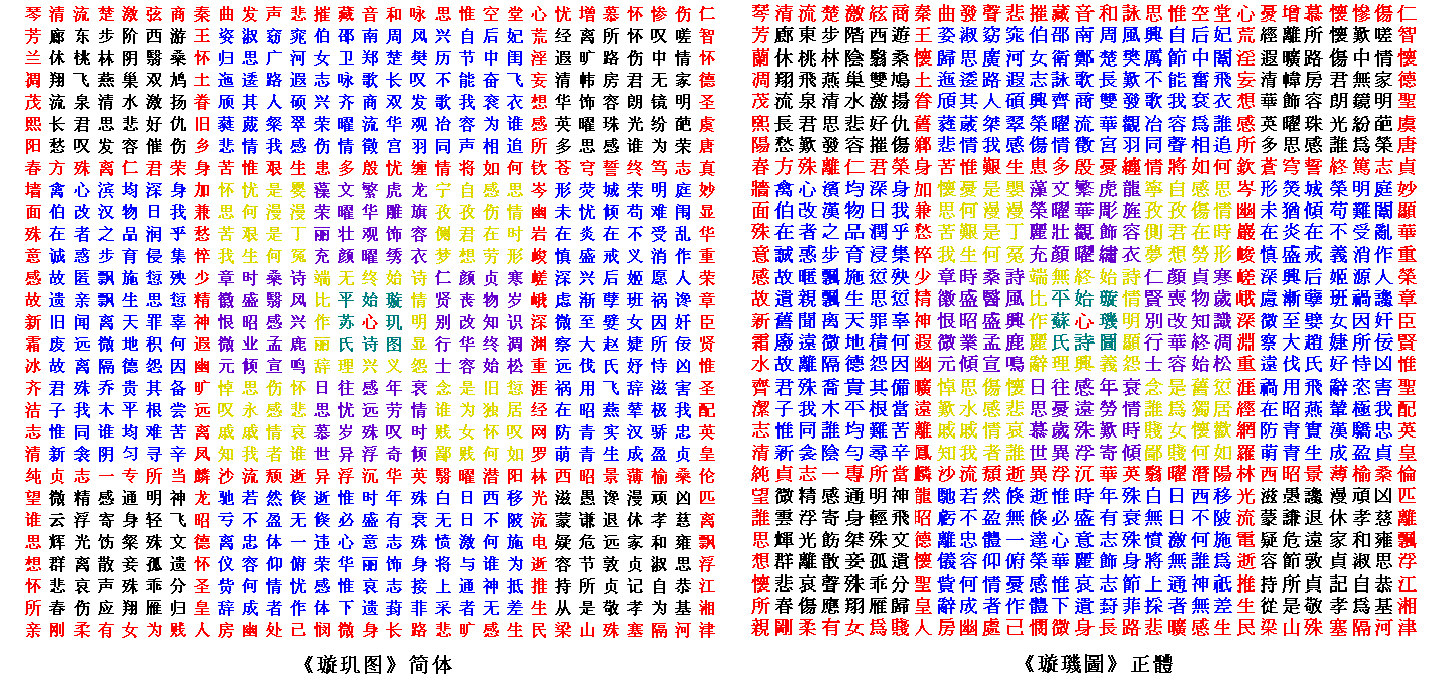
Reproductions of the lost original of Su Hui's "Xuanji Tu" palindrome poem.

The major exponent of the palindrome poem was Su Hui. Her "Xuanji Tu" poem is in the form of a twenty-nine by twenty-nine character grid, and can be read forward or backwards, horizontally, vertically, or diagonally.

== Midnight Songs poetry ==
Midnight Songs poetry also known as, Zi Ye, or "Lady Midnight" style, supposedly originating with an eponymously named fourth-century professional singer of the Eastern Jin dynasty.

== Xiaoxiang poetry ==
Xiaoxiang poetry has a long tradition in China, and later has been of influence more globally. This poetry was associated with the Xiaoxiang region of China, which was in turn historically associated with social and political exile.

== Yuan poetry of death and destruction (sangluan) ==
One genre of Classical Chinese poetry is known as sangluan (traditional Chinese: 喪亂; simplified Chinese: 丧乱; pinyin: sāngluàn; Wade–Giles: sang-luan): this is a genre of verse associated with the poetry of the Yuan dynasty which thematically has to do with the devastation of war and its associated death and disorders, specifically regarding the violent and tumultuous events leading up to and occurring during the course of the establishment of the Yuan dynasty by Kublai Khan. One great Chinese poet from the time of both the Jin and Yuan dynasties who wrote notable examples of this kind of poetry was Yuan Haowen. it could be said, however, that a vital forerunner in this genre was Du Fu, in respect of those poems he wrote in the midst of the An Lushan rebellion.

== See also ==
- Chinese literature, Classical poetry section
- Chinese poetry
- Ci (poetry)
- Classic of Poetry
- Classical Chinese poetry
- Five Classics
- Fu (poetry)
- Han poetry
- Jueju
- List of Chinese language poets
- Qu (poetry)
- Rime dictionary
- Rime table
- Shan shui
- Tang poetry
- Tone pattern
- Xiaoxiang
