= Metellus of Tegernsee =

Metellus of Tegernsee (fl. 1145–1165) was a Benedictine monk of Tegernsee Abbey and a Middle Latin poet.

== Life ==
Metellus' background is unknown. He was probably born into a noble family of Bavaria, since he mentions a brother named Wernher who lived in Schliersee. 'Metellus' is probably a pen name chosen for its classical connotations and not his given name. His poetic output is evidence of a solid classical education.

In addition to his original writings, Metellus also worked as a scribe. The manuscript Munich, Bayerische Staatsbibliothek, Clm 18257 is attributed to him and he has been identified as the copyist of some documents in the Tegernsee tradition book between 1155 and 1186.

== Works ==
=== Expeditio Hierosolymitana ===
Metellus wrote two major works. The first, Expeditio Hierosolymitana ('Expedition to Jerusalem'), is an account of the First Crusade in 4,845 hexameters. It was written between 1145 and 1165. The quality of the poetry and the Latinity compare favourably with contemporary works. It is based on the Robert the Monk's Historia Hierosolymitana. It also references some letters (e.g., from the Patriarch Arnulf of Chocques).

The Expeditio's historical value comes mainly as a window into a particularly German remembrance of the crusade. Metellus claims that Peter the Hermit's following included Germans and refers to Godfrey of Bouillon as the "leader of the Germans". He clarifies that the term 'Franks', used generically for all crusaders, was originally the name of the conquerors of Gaul and claims furthermore that the kingdom of France was a creation of the Emperor Arnulf. The Expeditio is the only source to place Wicher the German's origins in Fulda.

=== Quirinalia ===
The second and more sophisticated work is the Quirinalia, an account of Tegernsee's patron saint, Quirinus. It is a poetic elaboration of the older Passio Quirini. It covers the saint's life, passion and martyrdom, the translation of his relics to Tegernsee and the miracles associated with his intercession. Written perhaps as late as 1175, the Quirinalia is divided into six books, each containing several poems. The first four books are odes in the style of Horace; the fifth contains ten eclogues in the style of Vergil; and the sixth is written in retrograde hexameters. The Quirinalia survives in two recensions.

The unfinished sixth book is the Quirinalia contains stories relating to Tegernsee in the 11th and 12th centuries. These have a political slant: support for Abbot Rupert and Tegernsee's imperial immediacy; opposition to the Hirsau Reforms and the reforms of Bishop Otto of Freising; and rivalry with Benediktbeuern Abbey. Tegernsee's advocati are portrayed in a bad light. Within two decades of its appearance, the Quirinalia had been rendered into prose. The prose version, known as the Passio Secunda Sancti Quirini, expands upon the sixth book, adding further accounts of the misdeeds of the advocati.
