= Retrograde verse =

Retrograde verse is "poetry that is metrically and syntactically viable when read both forwards and backwards, word by word".

It is a difficult verse form. There are examples of retrograde verse in Latin from the classical, late antique and medieval periods. Medieval examples include:

- Centum concito by Oswald the Younger
- Terrigene bene nunc laudent by Oswald the Younger
- Book VI of the Quirinalia of Metellus of Tegernsee
- Tu tibi displiceas
- Me merito censo minimam
- Patribus hec omnibus by John of Garland
- Lebuine confessorum, a 15th-century sequence from the Lebuïnuskerk, Deventer

== See also ==
- Reversible poem
