= Heluo, Shandong =

Heluo 河洛镇
- Town
- Location in Shandong
- Coordinates: 37°0′46″N 120°42′39″E
- Country: People's Republic of China
- Province: Shandong
- Prefecture-level city: Yantai
- County-level city: Laiyang
- Time zone: UTC+8 (China Standard)

Heluo (Chinese: 河洛; pinyin: Héluò) is a town under the administration of Laiyang, Shandong, China. As of 2023, it administers the following 39 villages:

- Heluo Village
- Zhujiang Village (朱江村)
- Zhaojiatuan Village (赵家疃村)
- Tangjiawa Village (唐家洼村)
- Hejiagou Village (贺家沟村)
- Guanyinmiao Village (观音庙村)
- Pomaikou Village (泊麦口村)
- Lijialou Village (李家楼村)
- Lijiaying Village (李家营村)
- Mayakou Village (马崖口村)
- Zhujiazhuang Village (朱家庄村)
- Shenshanhou Village (神山后村)
- Zhaojiabuzi Village (赵家埠子村)
- Fanjiabuzi Village (范家埠子村)
- Xiaobu Village (小埠村)
- Muyu Village (沐浴村)
- Dalu Village (大路村)
- Longchuangou Village (龙川沟村)
- Maguding Village (麻姑顶村)
- Dashanhou Village (大山后村)
- Weikuang Village (苇夼村)
- Hebei Village (河北村)
- Zhangjia'an Village (张家庵村)
- Yugezhuang Village (于格庄村)
- Naogoutou Village (闹沟头村)
- Shenglizhuang Village (胜利庄村)
- Qingshishan Village (青石山村)
- Banpo Village (半坡村)
- Xinghua Village (杏花村)
- Laishankuang Village (莱山夼村)
- Yujialan Village (于家岚村)
- Yefang Village (冶房村)
- Houjiatuan Village (后家疃村)
- Zhoujiazaohang Village (周家枣行村)
- Dongyujiatuan Village (东于家疃村)
- Xiyujiatuan Village (西于家疃村)
- Wazi Village (洼子村)
- Luojiaoshi Village (落脚石村)
- Yangjiahe Village (杨家河村)
