= Li Ruzhen =

Chinese novelist and phonologist

Li Ruzhen, formerly romanized as Li Ju-chen (Chinese: 李汝珍; c. 1763 - 1830), courtesy name Songshi (松石), art name Songshi Daoren (松石道人), was a Chinese novelist and phonologist of the Qing dynasty. A native of Beijing, he was the author of the novel Jing Hua Yuan (鏡花緣), or Flowers in the Mirror. He also wrote Lishi Yinjian (李氏音鑑), a work of Chinese phonology, and complied Shou Zi Pu (受子譜), a valuable kifu of Go.

Flowers in the Mirror (completed in 1827) is a novel of fantasy and erudition in 100 chapters. In the first half of the novel, the protagonist, like Gulliver, travels to strange lands, reminiscent of what are mentioned in Shan Hai Jing. The second half of the novel is a display of Li's erudition, and reads more like an encyclopedia than a novel.

The Lishi Yinjian, in the line of the rime table tradition, comprises syllable charts which are both innovative and confusing. Like Li's novel, it is a work of erudition, quoting from more than 400 works. It is valuable for its recording of the phonological system of the then-Beijing dialect.

From a young age he had a rebellious nature. He strongly disagreed with the fixed style of composition (eight-legged essay) that people were required to learn in order to pass the examination needed to obtain a higher rank. Therefore, after obtaining the degree of xiucai (licentiate, the lowest in the examination hierarchy), he became a low-ranking officer, which was not considered respectable. However, his position did not mean that he was idle; he was a polymath, with expertise in astrology, medicine, mathematics, music, rhetoric, poetry, calligraphy and painting. His knowledge in all these subjects is amply reflected in Flowers in the Mirror, sometimes even to the hindrance of the plot.
