= Flowers in the Mirror =

19th-century novel by Li Ruzhen

Cover of a 1937 edition of Flowers in the Mirror (volume 1)

A glossary of the characters in the Flowers in the Mirror, in an early 20th-century edition of the novel

Flowers in the Mirror (traditional Chinese: 鏡花緣; simplified Chinese: 镜花缘; pinyin: Jìnghuāyuán), literally mirror flower bondings, also translated as The Marriage of Flowers in the Mirror, or Romance of the Flowers in the Mirror, is a fantasy novel written by Li Ruzhen (Li Ju-chen), completed in the year of 1827 during the Qing dynasty.

The 100-chapter novel is well-known today for its various kinds of fantasy stories and humorous writing style.

== Plot summary ==
Flowers in the Mirror is set in the reign of the Empress Wu Zetian (684–705) in the Tang dynasty. She took the throne from her own son, Emperor Zhongzong of Tang. Empress Wu lets the power she is given go to her head, and she demands that all of the flowers on the earth be in bloom by the next morning. The flower-spirits fear her and follow her orders, but they are then punished by the gods for doing so. Their punishment is to live on earth. Once their penance is complete, they will be allowed to go back to heaven again.

Tang Ao is the father of the incarnation of the Fairy of a Hundred Flowers. The Empress suspects him of having had a part in plotting rebellion against her and so she takes away his high scholarly rank and leaves him with the lowest rank that one can attain. Tang Ao responds to this by freeing himself from the coil of the mortal strife which binds the soul to the body and resolves to become an immortal by cultivating Tao.

Tang Ao is then told by a dream spirit that his destiny lies in foreign parts; and he decides to go overseas by junk with his brother-in-law, Merchant Lin. Tang Ao finds twelve of the incarnated flower-spirits during his journey and helps them all with the difficulties that they are having. Doing so enables him to become an immortal and, at the fair mountain of Little Penglai, he disappears.

During his journey, Tang Ao travels to the Country of Gentlemen, the Country of Women, the Country of Intestineless People, the Country of Sexless People, and the Country of Two-faced People, as well as many other countries. In the second half of the book Tang Ao's daughter goes to Little Penglai to look for him after his disappearance. Also, the incarnated flower-spirits take part in the "Imperial Examinations for Women", and along with their husbands and brothers they rise up and overthrow Empress Wu's rule, so restoring Emperor Tang Chung-tsung to the throne.

== Theme ==
The novel is known for its contribution to the idea of feminism. It eulogizes woman's talents, fully acknowledges their social status and breaks the old concept of gender roles. The author's idea is reflected through his creation of “The Nation of Girls” (女兒國), where a woman is the center of all. Men are made to dress like women and stay at home and look after the children, while women wear men's clothes, own businesses and are involved in politics. From the emperor to officials and servants, all are women. The author reinforces the idea that a woman's capability is not any less than a man's and that they can do just about anything that a man is capable of.

The author's ideal society is expressed through another model, the "Comity of Nation" (simplified Chinese: 君子国; traditional Chinese: 君子國). The name itself in Chinese, junzi, is originally from Confucian tradition and means a person of noble character and integrity. The real-world during Li Ruzhen's time was rather a nation of contention that is opposed to the idea of the "Comity of Nation" which suggests "rather yielding than arguing" (好讓不爭). Under the author's imagination, there is no putridity, no bribes between officials; citizens are all amicable and live a joyful life under a steady and rich government.

== Background ==
The author, Li Ruzhen, apparently believed in equal rights for women, a revolutionary idea in the feudal society of his day. In writing Flowers in the Mirror, he was attempting to ask for equality of men and women. When Li writes about the different countries he is giving his aspirations for an ideal society. The novel is full of fantasy which shows the author's unique vision of life.

Li had planned on writing a sequel to the Flowers in the Mirror but never did. He spent fifteen years writing the one hundred chapters of Flowers in the Mirror, and three years after it was published, he died. Li said that those of his friends who had been having trouble emotionally laughed when they read the first one hundred chapters and insisted that he get them published without writing any more.

== Impact ==
The saying "let a hundred flowers bloom" came into broad usage as a result of the novel. Li's use of the phrase echoed an older literary trope involving Wu Zetian, including a poem often attributed to the Empress. The idiom involved a critique of imperial power and imperial edicts.

By the time of the founding of the People's Republic of China, the meaning of Li's usage was largely gone, and the phrase generally implied a prosperous time or place, or an abundance of something (like culture or wealth). In the early PRC, the phrase was adapted to the naming of the Hundred Flowers Campaign.

== See also ==
- The Peach Blossom Spring: Another journey to a flower-related utopia.

Other late-imperial fantasy novels, whose content and style are comparable:

- Journey to the West by Wu Cheng'en
- Investiture of the Gods by Xu Zhonglin
- Strange Stories from a Chinese Studio by Pu Songling
