= Yang Jian (Song dynasty) =

Song dynasty eunuch (died 1121)

Yang Jian (Chinese: 楊戩, died 1121) was a court eunuch and government official of the Chinese Northern Song dynasty. He is best-known for implementing oppressive tax policies to increase government revenue during the reign of Emperor Huizong. In subsequent works of fiction, such as the classic novels Water Margin and Jin Ping Mei, he is almost always portrayed as treacherous and corrupt. In 1126, Yang was posthumously stripped of all his court titles by Emperor Qinzong.

== Early career ==
Yang Jian became a eunuch at a young age. During Emperor Huizong's early reign he worked in the imperial garden and often pleased the emperor. In the chongning (1102–1106) era he was promoted and put in charge of various affairs such as the management of the shrines, the casting of ding (tripods), and the construction of the Bureau of the Music of Great Brilliance (大晟樂府) and the Dragon Virtue Palace (龍德宫, the emperor's former princely mansion).

In 1114, Yang Jian was appointed as the jiedushi (military governor) of Zhanghua (彰化, in modern Gansu). There, he initiated the establishment of a guard army for the emperor's travels. Later, Yang Jian successively served as jiedushi in Zhen'an (鎮安, in modern Henan), Qinghai (清海, in modern Guangdong), and Zhendong (鎮東, in modern Zhejiang), and was promoted from Junior Inspecting Guardian (檢校少保) to the powerful position of Grand Mentor (太傅).

== Tax policies ==
While he was in Ru Prefecture, one of his subordinates named Du Gongcai (杜公才) came up with a plan to acquire land deeds from commoners and increase tax revenues. In 1116, Yang Jian created a Public Lands Bureau (公田所) in Jingxi Circuit to manage wastelands and tax-exempt lands. Commoners were forced to become tenant farmers and pay rent, and those who opposed the policy were cangued and imprisoned. This was later applied in the regions of Jingdong and Huainan, and rent was collected even on nonarable lands like abandoned embankments, abandoned weirs, barren hills, beaches and silted rivers.Even in areas affected by floods or drought, no tax breaks were given. Fishermen in Ji and Yun Prefectures were forced to pay taxes based on the number of boats in their possession. These measures increased a typical county's tax revenues by more than 100,000 strings of cash coins, which pleased the emperor.

== Later life ==
In 1119, Emperor Huizong began a palace project known as Genyue (艮岳) which would greatly expand his palace complex. The prime minister Cai Jing delegated this to the five leading eunuchs, Yang Jian, Tong Guan, Jia Xiang (賈祥), Lan Congxi (藍從熙), and He Xin (何訢), with each eunuch supervising the construction of a part of the complex. The eunuchs were said to have competed against one other to make the most luxurious buildings.

When Yang Jian died in 1121, he was honored as the Grand Preceptor and the Duke of Wu (吳國公). He was replaced in his position by Li Yan (李彥), who continued his tax policies even more aggressively, which caused widespread resentment. In 1126, Emperor Qinzong executed Li Yan and stripped Yang Jian of his posthumous titles.

== In fiction ==
Yang Jian appears in a number of fictional works. In many later stories he is known as Yang Taiwei or "Grand Commandant Yang" even though the historical figure never assumed that title.

The 12th-century story collection Yijian Zhi by Hong Mai contains a number of stories that feature him. The story "Yang Jian's Retainer" (楊戩館客) claims that he kept several dozens of concubines despite his impotence, and that he locked the gates to their quarters to prevent adultery. Once, while he was away in Zheng Prefecture, one of his retainers climbed over the wall with a ladder and began an affair first with one of his concubines, and soon with Yang's entire harem of sexually frustrated women. When Yang Jian returned, he saw the retainer getting stuck atop the wall; he later used a trick to castrate and enslave him. Several centuries later, this story was modified and expanded into the erotic story "Ren Junyong Gave Reins to His Sexual Induigence in the Harem; Grand Commandant Yang Found Amusement in Castrating His Retainer" (任君用恣樂深閨 楊太尉戲宮館客, translated into English as "The Harem") in Ling Mengchu's 1633 collection Slapping the Table in Amazement II.

In Xuanhe Yishi, Yang Jian frequently accompanied Emperor Huizong to brothels. In the 14th-century novel Water Margin by Shi Nai'an and Luo Guanzhong, Yang Jian is described as a dishonest official allied with Gao Qiu, Cai Jing, and Tong Guan. He was beaten by Li Kui in one of the earlier chapters. Near the end of the novel, he conspired to falsely accuse the Mount Liang heroes of treason. He was the mastermind behind Lu Junyi's poisoning.

Yang Jian also appears in the short story "The Leather Boot as Evidence against the God Erlang's Impostor" (勘皮靴單證二郎神, also translated as "The Boot that Reveals the Culprit") in Feng Menglong's 1627 collection Stories to Awaken the World.

In the 17th-century erotic novel Jin Ping Mei, the depraved protagonist Ximen Qing became an official for being a follower of Yang Jian and an associate of Cai Jing.

Guan Hanqing's 14th-century play The Riverside Pavilion tells the story of the beautiful and intelligent Tan Ji'er, whom a powerful Yang Yanei (楊衙内, Yang Junior) tried to forcibly marry. In the Peking opera version of this story, Yang Yanei is Yang Jian's adopted son.

== Notes and references ==
- Hu, Lenny Lingyi (1999). Sexuality and Containment: Ling Mengchu's Erotic Stories (PDF) (Ph.D. thesis). University of Toronto.
- Ebrey, Patricia Buckley (2014). Emperor Huizong. Harvard University Press. ISBN 978-0-674-72525-6.
