= Jiang Xingge Reencounters His Pearl Shirt =

"Jiang Xingge Reencounters His Pearl Shirt" (蔣興哥重會珍珠衫), also translated as "The Pearl-sewn Shirt" or "The Pearl Shirt Reencountered", is a Chinese novella collected during the late Ming Dynasty. The history of the piece is somewhat contentious but it was most notably included in the collection Illustrious Words to Instruct the World, written by Feng Menglong, and published in 1620.

== Genre ==
The piece has a few particular nuances that are worthy of note and distinction. First, the language in the piece is written vernacular, or baihua rather than literary language. This means that it was more accessible to the average person than pieces typically were. Second, while it is normally accepted by scholars that the piece was an adaptation of an oral story, there is evidence to support that the piece may in fact have been an adaptation of an earlier work, titled The Pearl Shirt as written by Sung Mao-Ch'eng Finally, the piece focuses on a mercantile lifestyle which was common for short stories at the time, but less common for Classical pieces like The Pearl Shirt.

The adaptation of the piece from The Pearl Shirt is notable for a few reasons. The translation from Classical language to baihua meant that many phrases were changed, and some of the distinctive language was lost. The structure between the pieces, though, has been primarily preserved, as well as most of the thematic content. There are roughly fifteen 'scenes' that the pair of stories share, and while much has changed the shift in perspective is most notable. The Pearl Shirt used a technique that Hanan referred to as "unobtrusive omniscience" whereas The Pearl-Sewn Shirt focused on "highly obtrusive omniscience." In layman's terms; the original piece had little outside context or interaction from the narrator, whereas the re-written one by Feng Meng-Long had a more expressive and invasive narrator or authorial tone.

== Plot ==
The story, which takes place in the early Ming dynasty, begins by following a merchant named Jiang Xingge, who has a respectable wife, Wang Sanqiao. The pair were well-matched and Xingge does not travel away from home for two years, putting his business on hold. Eventually, he does have to go south to conduct trade. Despite the many restrictions and limitations placed on his wife to preserve her chastity, Sanqiao is noticed by another merchant, Chen Dalang. Chen cannot meet Sanqiao because she stays indoors and is constantly surrounded by servants, as ordered by Xingge. Chen enlists the help of an older woman, also a merchant, named Madam Xue. She becomes friends with Sanqiao as part of Chen's scheme. Eventually, Madam Xue is able to bring the pair together and they begin an affair. Sanqiao and Chen fall in love with each other, despite the fact that both are married to others.

The next year, Chen travels away as well. As he departs, Sanqiao gives him a pearl-sewn shirt that is an important heirloom of the Jiang family. During his travels, Chen meets Jiang Xingge. Chen, not realizing that he is speaking to Sanqiao's husband, discusses his love affair. He shows Xingge the pearl shirt, and Xingge realizes the truth. Xingge returns home and sends his wife away with an order for a divorce. He also calls for thugs to smash up Madam Xue's home as punishment for her part in the misdeeds.

The story then changes perspective to follow Chen Dalang's wife, Pingshi. She and Chen argue over the pearl shirt, which Pingshi hides to spite him. Chen decides to go on a trip, but becomes ill during his travels. Pingshi leaves home intending to care for her husband during his illness, but Chen dies before her arrival. She is advised to marry another man so that she will be able to pay for Chen's funeral and to take care of herself. The marriage is arranged to Xingge. The couple get along well, and when Jiang Xingge sees the pearl shirt that Pingshi kept, he believes that their pairing is divine intervention.

In the fourth and final act, Xingge goes on another business trip. He gets into an argument in a market. This leads to the death of an old man, and Xingge has charges brought against him. The judge of the case is the new husband of his ex-wife, Sanqiao. She begs the judge to spare Xingge. When the judge hears the entire tale, he begins to cry. He realizes that Sanqiao and Xingge still care deeply for one another. The judge allows Sanqiao to leave him and become Xingge's second wife. Pingshi and Sanqiao prove to get along well, and the story draws to a close.

== Possible Themes ==
Generally the piece focuses on the reinforcing of Confucian morals, primarily dealing with social contracts, such as marital obligations. As Wang is eventually overcome by her sexual desire, it can be said that there is also a treatise against excess. A major portion of the work also seems to focus on the intent of divine intervention. This comes in a few forms; when Jiang meets Chen, who has his family's heirloom shirt, or Pingshi and Jiang's marriage, as well as Wang's second husband being the judge of Jiang's trial.

Second, there is the introduction of a few Buddhist notions, most notably in the form of compassion. While Jiang does show anger towards Madam Xue, he only does what society dictates towards his wife and divorces her. This serves as an important part of the story, as later, his wife's favor saves his life when dealing with the judge. Even more, the judge is compassionate enough to understand the love between Wang and Jiang, and allows her to leave him, to return to her first husband.

== Adaptation ==
A 2004 Chinese television film The Pearl Shirt (珍珠衫), directed by Teng Huatao, was based on the story. It starred Sunny Chan as Chen Dalang, Li Chen as Jiang Xingge, Choi On-kiu as Wang Sanqiao, and Cao Xiwen as the maid Qing'er.
