= Zhu Bian =

Chinese diplomat, historian and poet (1085–1144)

- Born: 1085; Wuyuan, She Prefecture, Song dynasty
- Died: 1144 (aged 58–59); Qiantang, Lin'an Prefecture, Song dynasty
- Occupations: Diplomat, historian, poet
- Spouses: Lady Chao (晁氏); Daughter of Wang Yi (王毅)
- Children: Zhu Lin (朱林) (son)
- Father: Zhu Xun (朱恂)
- Relatives: Zhu Sen (朱森) (brother)

Chinese name
- Chinese: 朱弁
Transcriptions
Standard Mandarin
- Hanyu Pinyin: Zhū Biàn
- Wade–Giles: Chu^{1} Pien^{4}

Zhu Shaozhang
- Chinese: 朱少章
Transcriptions
Standard Mandarin
- Hanyu Pinyin: Zhū Shàozhāng
- Wade–Giles: Chu^{1} Shao^{4}-chang^{1}

Zhu Bian (1085–1144), courtesy name Shaozhang, was a Chinese diplomat, historian, and poet during the Song dynasty who was detained by the Jurchen Jin dynasty for 15 years, during which he authored Quwei Jiuwen.

Zhu Bian's brother Zhu Sen (朱森) was the grandfather of Zhu Xi.

== Early life ==
Zhu Bian was from Wuyuan in She Prefecture. He was an avid reader in his childhood. At the age of 19, he enrolled in the Taixue (Imperial University), where he impressed Chao Yuezhi with his poetry. Thereafter, he followed Chao Yuezhi to Xinzheng in Zheng Prefecture and married Chao Yuezhi's niece there. Sandwiched between the national capital or "Eastern Capital" Kaifeng and the "Western Capital" Luoyang (known as Henan Prefecture), Xinzheng abounded in families with great lineages and learning. Zhu Bian enjoyed his life there and deepened considerably his knowledge.

Zhu Bian's happy life came to an end in November 1125 when the Jurchen-ruled Jin dynasty army attacked the Song from the north, quickly approaching Kaifeng, eventually capturing both Emperor Qinzong and Emperor Huizong in March 1127 in what is known as the Jingkang incident. Zhu Bian fled to the South with the Song imperial court but his wife was killed by Jin soldiers.

== As hostage in Jin ==
After Emperor Gaozong reestablished the Song dynasty in Hang Prefecture in May 1127, he called for a diplomatic mission to Jin to visit Emperor Qinzong and Emperor Huizong in 1128. Zhu Bian volunteered to go and was named the Communication Vice-Commissioner (通問副使), assisting the Communication Commissioner Wang Lun (王倫). Because he held no office, Zhu Bian also received several nominal titles before his trip. Once they arrived in the Jin territory of Yunzhong Prefecture (雲中, modern Datong) in 1130, the Jurchen general Wanyan Zonghan put them under house arrest and would not hear of their requests.

In 1132, the Jurchens told Wang Lun and Zhu Bian that they were willing to negotiate towards a treaty, and that one of them could return to Song with a letter. Zhu Bian told Wang Lun that he would stay behind: "When I came, I was already prepared to die." He told Wang Lun to return and work towards the treaty, and asked Wang Lun to leave the imperial seal with him. It is said that Zhu Bian kept the seal with him at all times, including in his sleep. The Jurchens wanted Zhu Bian to serve under Liu Yu (劉豫), a puppet emperor installed by them to govern the Central Plain, but Zhu called Liu Yu a "national traitor" and said he would rather die than serve him. The Jurchens starved him for a time, but Zhu would not submit. Later the Jurchens stopped coercing him, but Zhu was convinced that one way or another he would die in the North. Once, when he dined with a few captured scholar-officials from the Song, Zhu asked them to bury him when he died: "I will be grateful if you could inscribe the words 'The Grave of Zhu, Song's Communication Vice-Commissioner' on my tombstone." The others all had tears in their eyes, but Zhu continued talking and laughing.

== Later life ==
Zhu Bian finally returned to his country in 1143 when an agreement was reached between the Jin and the Song. Back in Lin'an, he entered the palace to thank Emperor Gaozong of Song and advised him to be always wary and prepared to war with Jin. The emperor wanted to confer him titles, but Zhu didn't receive them due to strong oppositions from the treacherous chief councilor Qin Hui. He died a year later.
