= Stories to Caution the World =

Book by Feng Menglong

Jing Shi Tong Yan (警世通言, Stories to Caution the World)
- Author: Feng Menglong (editor)
- Language: Written Chinese
- Genre: Short story anthology
- Publication date: 1624
- Publication place: Ming dynasty
- Preceded by: Stories Old and New
- Followed by: Stories to Awaken the World

Jingshi Tongyan (警世通言, Stories to Caution the World) is the second of a trilogy of widely celebrated Ming dynasty (1368–1644) vernacular story collections, compiled and edited by Feng Menglong and published in 1624. The first compilation, called Gujin Xiaoshuo (古今小説) (Stories Old and New), which is sometimes also referred to as Yushi Mingyan (喻世明言) (Stories to Enlighten the World or Illustrious Words to Instruct the World) was published in Suzhou in 1620. The third publication was called Xingshi hengyan (醒世恒言) (Stories to Awaken the World), and was published in 1627.

These three collections, often referred to as Sanyan (三言, "Three Words") because of the character yan (言) found at the end of each title, each contain 40 stories.

== Genre ==
Jingshi Tongyan is considered to be a huaben (话本), that is, short novel or novella. The huaben genre has been around since the Song dynasty (960-1279). The huaben genre includes collections of short stories, like Jingshi Tongyan, historical stories, and even stories from Confucian classics.

== Format ==
The format of Jingshi Tongyan follows the rest of the Sanyan, in that it contains 40 chapters, with each chapter being a different short story. Ling Mengchu, under the direct influence of Sanyan, wrote 2 more collections under the same format, known as Erpai (二拍). Together, sanyan and erpai are one of the greatest ancient Chinese vernacular literatures.

== Versions ==
There are two surviving original prints of Jingshi Tongyan, one located in Japan, belonging to Waseda University, and one in Taiwan, located in the National Library in Taipei. Because this collection was banned by various Chinese governments at some point, almost all of the original prints were burned. By the early 20th century, when the Republic of China emerged, this collection was already lost. Although the select stories from the collection, were included in Jingu Qiguan (今古奇觀), which was widely circulated during the Qing dynasty. It was not until a scholar from China visiting Japan in the 1930s discovered an original copy of Jingshi Tongyan did Jingshi Tongyan becomes popular again, and has been re-published since.

== List of Stories ==
Translated titles in this table mainly follow those by Shuhui Yang and Yunqin Yang in Stories to Caution the World: A Ming Dynasty Collection, Volume 2. University of Washington Press. 2005. ISBN 9780295985688. Titles used by other translators are listed as bullet points.

#	Title(s) of English Translation(s)	Chinese Title	Notes
1	"Yu Boya Smashes His Zither in Gratitude to an Appreciative Friend"	俞伯牙摔琴謝知音	
2	"Zhuang Zhou Drums on a Bowl and Attains the Great Dao"	莊子休鼓盆成大道	
3	"Three Times Wang Anshi Tries to Baffle Academician Su": Bishop 1956: "Wang An-shih Thrice Corners Su Tung-p'o"	王安石三難蘇學士	
4	"In the Hall Halfway-up-the-Hill, the Stubborn One Dies of Grief": Yang 1972: "The Stubborn Chancellor"	拗相公飲恨半山堂	
5	"Lu Yu Returns the Silver and Brings about Family Reunion"	呂大郎還金完骨肉	
6	"Yu Liang Writes Poems and Wins Recognition from the Emperor"	俞仲舉題詩遇上皇	
7	"Chen Kechang Becomes an Immortal during the Dragon Boat Festival": Yang 1972: "P'u-sa Man"	陳可常端陽仙化	
8	"Artisan Cui's Love is Cursed in Life and in Death": Wang 1944: "The Jade Kuanyin"; Yang & Yang 1957: "The Jade Worker"; Lung 1978: "Artisan Ts'ui and His Ghost Wife"	崔待詔生死冤家	
9	"'Li the Banished Immortal' Writes in Drunkenness to Impress the Barbarians": Dolby 1978: "Li Bai (Li Po), God in Exile, Drunken Drafts His 'Letter to Daunt the Barbarians'"	李謫仙醉草嚇蠻書	
10	"Secretary Qian Leaves Poems on the Shallow Tower"	錢舍人題詩燕子樓	
11	"A Shirt Reunites Magistrate Su with His Family"	蘇知縣羅衫再合	
12	"A Double Mirror Brings Fan the Loach and His Wife Together Again": Wieman 1986: "Loach Fan's Double Mirror"	范鰍兒雙鏡重圓	
13	"Judge Bao Solves a Case through a Ghost That Appeared Thrice": Chang 1973: "The Clerk's Lady"; Yang & Yang 1981: "The Ghost Came Thrice"	三現身包龍圖斷冤	
14	"A Mangy Priest Exorcises a Den of Ghosts": Jones 1986: "A Mangy Taoist Exorcises Ghosts"	一窟鬼癩道人除怪	
15	"Clerk Jin Rewards Xiutong with a Pretty Maidservant"	金令史美婢酬秀童	
16	"The Young Lady Gives the Young Man a Gift of Money": Yang & Yang 1957: "The Honest Clerk"	小夫人金錢贈年少	
17	"The Luckless Scholar Rises Suddenly in Life"	鈍秀才一朝交泰	
18	"A Former Protégé Repays His Patrons unto the Third Generation"	老門生三世報恩	
19	"With a White Falcon, Young Master Cui Brings an Evil Spirit upon Himself": Yang 1972: "The White Hawk of Ts'ui, the Magistrate's Son, Led to Demons"	崔衙內白鷂招妖	
20	"The Golden Eel Brings Calamity of Officer Ji"	計押番金鰻產禍	
21	"Emperor Taizu Escorts Jingniang on a One-Thousand-Li Journey": Lieu 1978: "The Sung Founder Escorts Ching-niang One Thousand Li"	趙太祖千里送京娘	
22	"Young Mr. Song Reunites with His Family by Means of a Tattered Felt Hat": Yang & Yang 1957: "The Tattered Felt Hat"	宋小官團圓破氈笠	
23	"Mr. Le Junior Searches for His Wife at the Risk of His Life"	樂小舍棄生覓偶	
24	"Yutangchun Reunites with Her Husband in Her Distress"	玉堂春落難逢夫	
25	"Squire Gui Repents at the Last Moment"	桂員外途窮懺悔	
26	"Scholar Tang Gains a Wife after One Smile"	唐解元一笑姻緣	
27	"Fake Immortals Throw Guanghua Temple into an Uproar"	假神仙大鬧華光廟	
28	"Madam White is Kept Forever under the Thunder Peak Tower": Yang & Yang 1959: "The White Snake"; Chang 1973: "Madame White"; Yu 1978: "Eternal Prisoner under the Thunder Peak Pagoda"	白娘子永鎮雷峰塔	
29	"Zhan Hao Meets Yingying at Lingering Fragrance Pavilion"	宿香亭張浩遇鶯鶯	
30	"Wu Qing Meets Ai'ai by Golden Bright Pond"	金明池吳清逢愛愛	
31	"Zhao Chun'er Restores Prosperity to the Cao Farmstead"	趙春兒重旺曹家莊	
32	"Du Shiniang Sinks her Jewel Box in Anger": Yang & Yang 1957: "The Courtesan's Jewel Box"; Ho 1978: "Tu Shih-niang Sinks the Jewel Box in Anger"	杜十娘怒沉百寶箱	
33	"Qiao Yanjie's Concubine Ruins the Family"	喬彥傑一妾破家	
34	"Wang Jiaoluan's One Hundred Years of Sorrow"	王嬌鸞百年長恨	
35	"Prefect Kuang Solves the Case of the Dead Baby": Hsia & Zonana 1974: "The Case of the Dead Infant"	況太守斷死孩兒	
36	"The King of the Honey Locusts Grove Assumes Human Shape"	皂角林大王假形	
37	"Wan Xiuniang Takes Revenge through Toy Pavilions"	萬秀娘仇報山亭兒	
38	"Jiang Shuzhen Dies in Fulfillment of a Love Bird Prophecy"	蔣淑真刎頸鴛鴦會	
39	"The Stars of Fortune, Rank, and Longevity Returns to Heaven"	福祿壽三星度世	
40	"An Iron Tree at Jingyang Palace Subdues Demons"	旌陽宮鐵樹鎮妖	

== Popularity ==
Jingshi Tongyan proved to be popular in China after its many re-publications. Many of the stories from the collection were used as the basis of Chinese opera in the 1960s right before the Chinese Cultural Revolution. Jingshi Tongyan also proved to be popular in Japan as well, where stories were taken and transformed into Japanese tales by changing the setting to Japan.
