= Prefect Qiao Rearranges Matches in an Arbitrary Decision =

"Prefect Qiao Rearranges Matches in an Arbitrary Decision" (喬太守亂點鴛鴦譜) is a Chinese comedy from the 1627 short-story anthology Stories to Awaken the World by Feng Menglong. An earlier and much shorter version titled "They Become a Couple Thanks to Their Brother and Sister" (因兄姊得成夫婦) is found in Luo Ye (羅燁)'s The Drunken Man's Talk (醉翁談錄) from the 13th century, but because this book was lost for centuries and not re-discovered until 1941 (in Japan), this version is relatively unknown.

== English translations ==
- "Prefect Qiao Rearranges Matches in an Arbitrary Decision" (translated by Shuhui Yang and Yunqin Yang)
- "They Become a Couple Thanks to Their Brother and Sister" (translated by Alister D. Inglish)

== Modern adaptations ==
- Magistrate Kiu's Careless Matching (喬太守亂點鴛鴦譜), a 1956 Hong Kong film starring Cheng Pik-ying
- Prefect Qiao Rearranges Matches in an Arbitrary Decision (喬太守亂點鴛鴦譜), a 1962 Chinese film starring Luo Yuzhong
- Prefect Qiao Rearranges Matches in an Arbitrary Decision (喬太守亂點鴛鴦譜), a 1963 Hong Kong film starring Chan Chor-wai
- Comedy of Mismatches (喬太守亂點鴛鴦譜), a 1964 Hong Kong film starring Pat Ting Hung
- Chinese Folklore (民間傳奇), a 1974–1977 Hong Kong TVB series (the 1975 segment "Prefect Qiao Rearranges Matches in an Arbitrary Decision")
- Prefect Qiao Rearranges Matches in an Arbitrary Decision (喬太守亂點鴛鴦譜), a 1995 Taiwanese Rebar-Union (now Eastern Television) series
