= Oey Kim Tiang =

Indonesian translator (1903–1995)

- Born: 9 February 1903; Bekasi, Dutch East Indies
- Died: 8 March 1995 (aged 92); Tangerang, West Java, Indonesia
- Other names: OKT, Boe Beng Tjoe, and others
- Occupations: Writer, translator
- Years active: 1920s–1995
- Known for: Translations of Chinese literature and martial arts novels

Chinese name
- Traditional Chinese: 黃金長
- Simplified Chinese: 黄金长
Transcriptions
Standard Mandarin
- Hanyu Pinyin: Huáng Jīncháng
Southern Min
- Hokkien POJ: Ûiⁿ Kim-tiâng

Oey Kim Tiang (9 February 1903 – 8 March 1995) was an Indonesian translator of Chinese novels. Born to a supervisor at a coconut plantation, Oey studied at a school run by the Tiong Hoa Hwe Koan in Tangerang. Graduating at the age of twenty, he found work with the newspaper Keng Po as a translator. His first published translation, Tong Tjioe Liat Kok, retold the Chronicles of the Eastern Zhou Kingdoms in vernacular Malay. Over the next sixty years, Oey translated dozens of works, ranging from classics of Chinese literature such as Journey to the West to the wuxia novels of Jin Yong and Liang Yusheng.

== Early life ==
Oey was born in Bekasi, Dutch East Indies (now Indonesia), on 9 February 1903. His father, Oey Kee Hok, the supervisor at a coconut plantation, was descended from a Chinese family that had migrated to the Indies five generations previously. Oey's mother died when he was young, likely around the time he was three years old, when his twin brother Oey Kim Siang passed. Consequently, Oey was often left with neighbours while his father was working.

The Oey family lived in Tangerang, and Oey was enrolled in a school run by the Tiong Hoa Hwe Koan. Instruction was completed in the Zhangzhou dialects of Hokkien, as most of the local Chinese community traced their roots to the Fujian region of southern China. Among the subjects he learned was the history of China. Oey enrolled relatively late in life, and only completed his junior high school at the age of twenty. At the urging of his classmate, Ong Kim Tiat, Oey entered the workforce rather than continue his studies.

== Introduction to translation ==
Through his maternal uncle, Oey found work at the newspaper Keng Po. He was tasked with translating works into Malay, and completed his first translation, Tong Tjioe Liat Kok (from Hokkien Tong-chiu Lia̍t-kok, Chronicles of the Eastern Zhou Kingdoms), under the pseudonym K.T. Jr. (Note: Murtiyoso (2012, p. 806) writes that this pseudonym was chosen in reference to Ong Kim Tiat.) In this process, he often consulted Ong, who was also a translator of martial arts stories. Through the late 1920s Oey completed a series of other translations, including several wuxia (martial arts) stories. According to Sutrisno Murtiyoso, the best received of these were his translations of The Seven Heroes and Five Gallants and its sequel The Five Younger Gallants, completed between 1927 and 1928. Other translations included Nona Badjoe Idjo and Kawanan Merah Hitam, both of which were detective stories.

By 1936, Oey was contributing to multiple periodicals, including Keng Po and Sin Po in Batavia (now Jakarta). He used a variety of pseudonyms, with Huang, H., Boe Beng Tjoe (Chinese: 無名子; Pe̍h-ōe-jī: Bû Bêng-chú; "the man with no name"), and C.C. Huang all attested during this period. In the 1930s, Oey married Lie Soe Nio, with whom he had four children: Lan Ing, Hin Gie, Lan Hiang, and Hin Lim. Another pen name, Aulia, was later derived from the name of his granddaughter.

After the Empire of Japan invaded the Indies in 1941, publishing houses were shut down. The Oey family home was destroyed during the Indonesian National Revolution (1945–1949). Oey thus began anew, and after publications resumed he published several further translations. Soei Ho Toan (Water Margin, Súi-hó͘-toān) was serialized in Sin Po in 1950, while See Yoe (Journey to the West, 西遊; Si-iû) was published in book format by Magic Carpet.

== Post-war career ==
Oey, predominantly using the initialism OKT, (Note: Song (2017, p. 226) notes that Oey Kim Tiang and Ong Kim Tiat both used the same initialism. Consequently, it is difficult to distinguish their translations.) gained increased prominence in independent Indonesia. He produced translations of Wang Dulu's Crane-Iron Pentalogy (鶴鐵系列), as well as the oeuvres of Jin Yong and Liang Yusheng. His serials were published in Keng Po, Sin Po, and Star Weekly. By 1959, Oey was sufficiently busy that he was turning down translation requests; when approached by Kho Ping Hoo to become a regular contributor for his magazine Teratai (Lotus), he refused.

The serialization of wuxia stories was banned in Jakarta in 1961, and thus Oey published his translations in book format. These publications, too, were briefly banned beginning in 1966. Ultimately, in 1968, Oey found a new publisher in Marga Djaja. Before the publishing house closed in 1972, Oey had completed eleven titles. These included Memanah Burung Radjawali (The Legend of the Condor Heroes) and Radjawali Sakti (The Return of the Condor Heroes); both were published under the pseudonym Boe Beng Tjoe, and the latter was completed by Oey An Siok when Oey Kim Tiang fell ill. (Note: Oey An Siok also published several translations by himself, borrowing the pseudonym Boe Beng Tjoe. These included Kisah Pembunuh Naga (The Heaven Sword and Dragon Saber), the third instalment in Jin Yong's Condor Trilogy, as well as his The Young Flying Fox, and two novels by Liang Yusheng (Suryadinata 2013, p. 412).) Two more stories, including Si Kasim Tjilik (Young Kasim) – a translation of The Deer and the Cauldron – were left unfinished.

In the 1970s, Oey began to withdraw from publication. Reader tastes had shifted, with the vernacular Malay used by Oey giving way to the formalized Indonesian language. Feeling himself less than fluent, Oey sought an editor, but was mostly unsuccessful. Nonetheless, he completed several works during this period. In 1990, Yayasan Obor Indonesia published his 1985 translation Sam Pek Eng Tay (Butterfly Lovers, 梁山伯与祝英台, edited by Achmad Setiawan Abadi). Ajip Rosidi also edited three volumes of Oey's Dua Musuh Turunan (Two Generational Enemies, a translation of Liang Yusheng's Pingzong Xiaying Lu [萍蹤俠影錄]), which he republished in 1996.

Oey's health began deteriorating in the 1980s, and he stopped work on his final translation project, a story of Empress Wu Zetian. He died on 8 March 1995 in Tangerang. At the time, he was living with his daughter in a house on Cilangkap Street, near the Cisadane River. His wife had died in 1971.

== Analysis ==
Oey is considered one of the most prolific Malay-language translators of Chinese novels. Known for his attention to detail, Oey would read stories and make notes prior to beginning his translation; these notes were subsequently used to ensure consistency. He would write some notes and analysis on the covers of books. Where classical poems were quoted in the text, as in the works of Jin Yong and Liang Yusheng, Oey would delay publication time to ensure the accuracy of his translations. Through these translations, Oey introduced many Indonesian readers to the wuxia genre, and it became popular through the 1960s and 1970s. A local version of the genre, dubbed cerita silat, also emerged.

Oey's translations were published predominantly in vernacular Malay, which had been the lingua franca of the Chinese community in the late colonial era. In a 1989 interview with Kompas, Oey said that he sought to use language that could be understood by everyone, from elementary school students and housewives to pedicab drivers and vegetable mongers. He referred to himself variously as a narrator or plagiarist, using his voice to retell the stories of others.

== Works cited ==
- Murtiyoso, Sutrisno (2012). "Oey Kim Tiang". In Suryadinata, Leo (ed.). Southeast Asian Personalities of Chinese Descent: A Biographical Dictionary. Institute of Southeast Asian Studies. pp. 805–807. ISBN 978-981-4345-21-7.
- "Oey Kim Tiang (OKT), Pendekar Buku Silat" [Oey Kim Tiang (OKT), Warrior for Wuxia Novels]. Kompas (in Indonesian). Jakarta. 14 January 1989. p. 12.
- "Penerjemah dari Tangerang" [Translator from Tangerang]. Kompas (in Indonesian). Jakarta. 13 August 2005. p. 33.
- Sidharta, Myra (1994). "Asmaraman Sukowati Kho Ping Hoo (b. 1926): Writer of Cloak-and-dagger Stories in Indonesia". Archipel. 48: 157–176. doi:10.3406/arch.1994.3007.
- Song, Ge (2017). "Note sur le Musée-bibliothèque des Chinois peranakan de Tangerang, Jakarta" [Note on the Peranakan Chinese Museum and Library in Tangerang, Jakarta]. Archipel (in French) (93): 219–228. doi:10.4000/archipel.418.
- Suryadinata, Leo (1993). Chinese Adaptation and Diversity: Essays on Society and Literature in Indonesia, Malaysia & Singapore. Singapore: NUS Press. ISBN 978-9971-69-186-8.
- Suryadinata, Leo (2013). "Post-War Kung Fu Novels in Indonesia – A Preliminary Survey". In Salmon, Claudine (ed.). Literary Migrations: Traditional Chinese Fiction in Asia (17th-20th Centuries). Singapore: Institute of Southeast Asian Studies. pp. 393–414. ISBN 978-981-4414-32-6.
- Suryadinata, Leo, ed. (2015). "Oey Kim Tiang". Prominent Indonesian Chinese: Biographical Sketches (4th ed.). Singapore: Institute of Southeast Asian Studies. pp. 206–207. ISBN 9789814345217.
