= Kho Ping Hoo =

Chinese Indonesian writer (1926–1994)

- Born: 1926 (Note: Kho's date of birth is not recorded. Later in life, based on the memory that he was born sometime in August, he chose 17 August 1926 as his official date of birth (Pattisina 2021, p. 2).); Sragen, Dutch East Indies
- Died: 22 July 1994 (aged 67); Surakarta, Central Java, Indonesia
- Other name: Asmaraman Sukowati
- Occupation: Writer
- Years active: 1950s–1994
- Known for: Martial arts novels

Chinese name
- Chinese: 許平和
Transcriptions
Standard Mandarin
- Hanyu Pinyin: Xǔ Pínghé
- Wade–Giles: Hsü^{3} P`ing^{2}-ho^{2}
Southern Min
- Hokkien POJ: Khó͘ Pêng-hô

Kho Ping Hoo (1926 – 22 July 1994), also known as Asmaraman Sukowati, was an Indonesian author of fiction. He mostly wrote martial arts stories inspired by the wuxia genre and set in historical China and Indonesia, but also produced romances and detective stories.

Born in Sragen to a peranakan Chinese sugar broker, (Note: In studies of the Chinese diaspora in Indonesia, the term peranakan is commonly used to refer to persons of Chinese heritage born in the Malay Archipelago whose first language is Indonesian or another local language. Meanwhile, the term totok refers to more recent immigrants who remain culturally oriented towards China (Sidharta 1994, p. 175).) Kho spent much of his early life as an itinerant worker. In the 1950s, following some time at a refugee camp, Kho settled in Tasikmalaya. Having read extensively and learned storytelling from his mother, he began writing short stories and established a literary magazine. For the latter, he began work on his first serial, Pek Liong Po Kiam: Pedang Pusaka Naga Putih (lit. 'The Heirloom Sword White Dragon', 1959). As Kho continued to write, he purchased a printing press and, after moving to Surakarta in 1964, established the Gema Publishing House, which he operated with his family. Kho continued to write, producing several volumes per month, which were distributed to lending libraries and book stalls throughout Indonesia. Having experienced racially motivated violence on several occasions, he promoted the assimilation of Chinese Indonesians and their intermarriage with the indigenous population.

By the time of his death, Kho had produced more than 130 titles. (Note: Safutra (2019) writes that Kho completed 133 stories. A list published by Matra magazine in 1995 itemized 140 novels in multiple series (Matra 2012, pp. 71–76). Pattisina (2021, p. 2) gives 143 stories, Sidharta (2012, p. 406) gives 145, Mannan (2025) gives 148, Suryana, Krishnapatria & Mariamurti (2023, p. 253) give more than 150, and Sidharta (1994, p. 162) gives 180. A 1981 profile by Kompas claims that he had published more than 200 titles by that point. Ensiklopedia Sastra Indonesia, published by the Indonesian Ministry of Education and Culture, also credits more than 200 titles to Kho's oeuvre.) Most were published in monthly instalments, with an average of thirty-five volumes per title. Kho wrote almost exclusively in Indonesian, though he used Hokkien loan words and published one title in Javanese. Aside from one, his stories were original works that drew on the corpus of Indonesian-language translations of Chinese wuxia novels as well as imported films from Hong Kong and Taiwan. His martial arts fiction was mostly set in historical China and Indonesia, with his main characters primarily warrior aristocrats who left the court in search of excitement, knowledge, or vengeance. His novels were adapted to comics, film, radio, stage, and television, and influenced numerous writers both within and without the martial arts genre. His works were popular among readers from diverse socio-economic backgrounds.

== Biography ==
=== Early life ===
Kho was born in Sragen, Dutch East Indies (now Indonesia), in 1926 to a peranakan Chinese family. He was the second of twelve children born to Kho Kiem Po, a sugar broker, and Sri Welas Asih. (Note: Sidharta (2012, p. 406) gives fifteen.) Several of his ancestors, including his maternal great-grandmother and paternal grandmother, were of Javanese heritage. From a young age, Kho learned the Javanese language and script, and was exposed to Javanese mysticism. Kho's mother was a practised storyteller who instilled in him a love for stories, and from others he heard Javanese poetry. Meanwhile, Kho's father practised and taught Shaolin kung fu. As such, Kho became familiar with it despite never becoming a martial artist himself.

Kho attended a Dutch-run school for his primary education, where he began to read extensively. Afterwards, he was accepted at a junior secondary school run by missionaries. However, after a few months, his family was unable to afford further schooling. and Kho became an itinerant worker at the age of fourteen. He travelled to several cities, including Kudus and Surabaya, looking for work, with which he helped support his brothers and sisters. He was in Surabaya selling medicines when the Empire of Japan invaded the Dutch East Indies in 1941. During the ensuing occupation, he remained in the city, where he received some military training through the Japanese Kaibotai civil defence programme.

After the Battle of Surabaya in November 1945, Kho moved back to Sragen, where he married Rosita (born Ong Ros Hwa). During the next four years, amidst the Indonesian National Revolution, Kho alternated between Sragen and Kudus, selling cigarettes to earn money while also fighting alongside the Barisan Pemberontak Tionghoa (lit. 'Chinese Rebel Faction'). After Operation Kraai resulted in Sragen falling to the returning Dutch forces, in 1949 Kho evacuated to a refugee camp near Surakarta. After the war, Kho settled in Tasikmalaya, West Java, where he spent some time working for a construction crew before joining a transportation company. Eventually, he led the local council governing truck transportation. Around this time, he began learning Mandarin Chinese to converse with his totok Chinese peers, many of whom remained culturally closer to China, and was fluent in Dutch, Javanese, and Sundanese.

Following the ratification of the Sino-Indonesian Dual Nationality Treaty in 1955, Kho was required to choose between Chinese and Indonesian citizenship. Kho chose Chinese citizenship and, after a law passed in 1959 prohibited merchants of Chinese heritage from working in rural areas, made plans to leave the archipelago. His travel arrangements fell through and he remained in Indonesia. Having already learned some English from radio broadcasts, he began to study the language formally. He received certification from the British Council and spent time as a teacher.

=== Literary beginnings ===
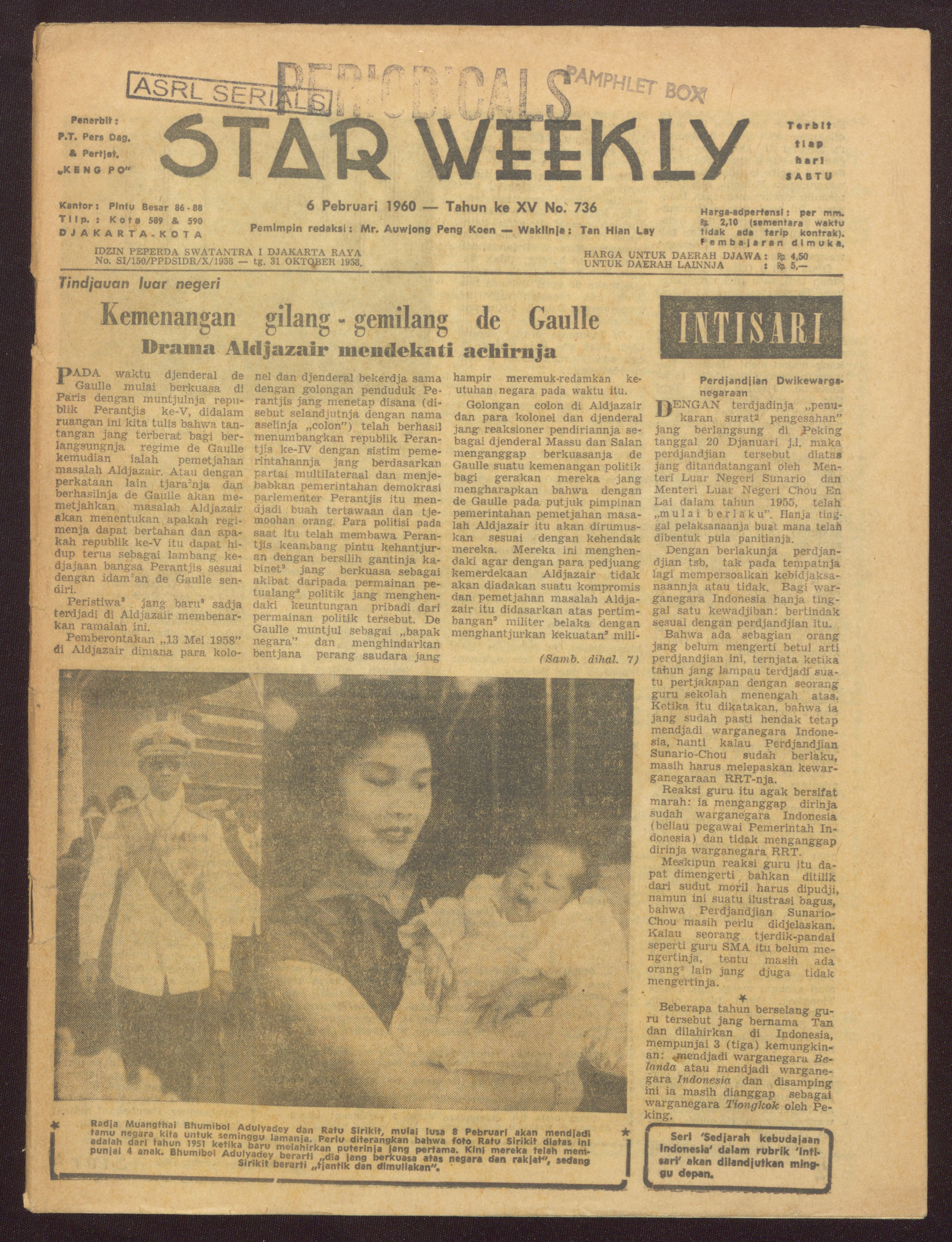
The 6 February 1960 edition of Star Weekly; Kho published his first stories in the magazine.

In the 1950s, Kho began writing. (Note: Sources differ as to the exact year. In their biography of Kho, Atmowiloto, Sawega & Darmawan T (2012, p. 15) give 1951. Suryadinata (2012, p. 41) gives 1952. Meanwhile, Salmon (1981, p. 192) gives 1956.) He was primarily self-taught, learning how to write from his reading. His first published story was included in Star Weekly in 1958. (Note: Sources differ as to the title. Sidharta (1994, p. 162), citing the literature scholar Ernst Ulrich Kratz, identifies the story as "Jika Saku Kosong" ('When Pockets are Empty'). Meanwhile, Yatim (2012, p. 35) identifies the story as "Hidup di Kolong Jembatan" ('Living Under a Bridge').) He subsequently published works in magazines such as Selecta and Pancawarna. In 1959, Kho established the literary magazine Teratai ('Lotus') with some friends. They initially sought to have Oey Kim Tiang, a popular translator of Chinese stories, become a regular contributor, but Oey refused. Kho thus began work on his first novel Pek Liong Po Kiam ('The Heirloom Sword White Dragon'). The first instalments of this martial arts story (cerita silat) were published in Teratai. When the magazine collapsed after four issues, the serial was picked up by the Jakarta-based Analisa. The serial was an immediate success.

Kho capitalized on his newfound popularity with new serials such as Patung Dewi Kwan Im ('The Statue of the Goddess Guanyin', 1960) and Darah Mengalir di Borobudur ('Blood Flows at Borobudur', 1961). At the same time, he continued to publish short stories, with Symasudin Lubis—the director of the Selecta group—asking him to become a regular contributor to his magazines. Kho also became a regular correspondent for the daily Keng Po and contributed to the newspaper Pikiran Rakyat. Four of his stories were included in Pertemuan ('Meeting'), a collection published by Djelita c. 1960. (Note: The collection does not include a date of publication. The Sinologist Claudine Salmon dates it to 1950 (Sidharta 1994, p. 162) Based on textual references to certain products and political events, Watson (2017, p. 541) dates it to 1960–1963.)

During a wave of violence against Chinese Indonesians in West Java in 1963, stones were cast at Kho, his home was razed, and his printing press destroyed. He thus relocated to Surakarta in 1964, where he settled in the Mertokusuman district. Further violence against Chinese Indonesians erupted in Surakarta during the widespread violence that followed the failed 30 September Movement coup in 1965, and Kho again considered moving to China. Ultimately, as his children were still young, he remained in Indonesia.

=== Gema and later life ===
Soon after arriving in Surakarta, Kho established the Gema Publishing House and a printing house to publish his works. He continued to write, variously using the names Kho Ping Hoo, Asmaraman S., and Asmaraman S. Kho Ping Hoo. (Note: The name Asmaraman was taken after Presidential Decree No. 240 of 1967 mandated that Chinese Indonesians take Indonesian-sounding names (Rizal & Nugroho 2020).) He focused primarily on the silat genre, with works including Badai Laut Selatan ('Storm in the Southern Sea', 1969), Pendekar Super Sakti ('The Super-Sacred Warrior', 1969), and Perawan Lembah Wilis ('Maiden from the Green Valley', 1970). At the same time, he continued to serialize in magazines such as Selecta, Roman Detektip, and Monalisa. By November 1980, Gema employed approximately 100 people.

In the 1970s, Kho renounced his Chinese citizenship and became an Indonesian citizen. He began to promote the assimilation of Chinese Indonesians, arguing that intermarriage between persons of Chinese and indigenous heritage would facilitate racial harmony; by 1980, two of his daughters had married indigenous men. When racialized violence erupted in Surakarta in November 1980, Kho's printing press and home were defended by his predominantly indigenous staff. Covering the incident, the magazine Tempo cited it as evidence that Kho had successfully integrated himself into indigenous society.

Reader interest in Kho's stories had dwindled by the 1990s, partly due to the proliferation of television, and partly due to increased access to imported materials. Although silat stories remained popular, especially in cinemas,, first-run printings of Kho's novels decreased from a peak of 15,000 copies in the 1970s to 5,000. (Note: As works were distributed primarily through lending libraries, the number of copies sold is not equivalent to total readership; one copy could be borrowed by dozens of readers (Suryadinata 2012, p. 44).) For additional income, Gema began printing tickets and invitations; by this point the company was run primarily by Kho's son-in-law Bunawan SW. As revenues decreased, Kho continued to write every day. He spent five days per week at his villa Wisma Damai in Tawangmangu, a village on the slopes of Mount Lawu approximately 40 kilometres (25 mi) east of Surakarta.

Working based on detailed synopses written at the beginning of each project, (Note: According to the family, Kho sometimes wrote these synopses himself, and sometimes asked the children to provide them (Suryana, Krishnapatria & Mariamurti 2023, p. 255).) Kho produced two to three manuscripts per month. He worked on up to four texts simultaneously, often starting work on new volumes for ongoing series after earlier volumes had been published. After each volume was written, Kho and his family then handled the editing and layout before sending the books for setting and publication. Works were then sent to agents in Indonesia's major cities, and then were made available to readers through lending libraries and small bookstalls. Only in the 1990s did Gramedia, the largest book retailer in Indonesia, stock Kho's works.

In 1985, Kho was diagnosed with a heart condition but refused long-term care. On 21 July 1994, he complained of chest pain and collapsed at his villa. Kho was brought to Surakarta, where he was treated at Kasih Ibu Hospital. He regained consciousness in the afternoon, but died the following morning of complications from heart and kidney disease. After a period of lying in repose, during which his body was viewed by thousands, Kho was cremated at the Tiong Ting Crematorium. His ashes were scattered in the Indian Ocean. He left behind two wives, Rosita and Hartini, and twelve children.

== Legacy ==
=== Output ===
By the time of his death, Kho had written more than 130 stories. One historical drama, Hancurnya Kerajaan Han ('The Fall of the Han Dynasty'), was left incomplete. Most of Kho's novels were issued in monthly volumes of pocket size, averaging 35 volumes per title, with each illustrated volume averaging 60 pages in length. Many stories went through multiple reprints, which were handled by Kho's publishing house Gema. (Note: For example, by 2002 Kho's Suling Emas ('The Golden Flute') had been reprinted eleven times (Suryana, Krishnapatria & Mariamurti 2023, p. 257).) Works by Kho included stand-alone stories and stories published as part of a series; some works were initially published on their own, but later incorporated into a series. Kho's longest series, Bu Kek Siansu ('Zen Master Bu Kek', 1968), consisted of 17 titles.

Mostly, Kho did not translate existing works of Chinese literature. He had a limited command of oral Mandarin and he could not read the script. His Si Teratai Emas ('The Golden Lotus', 1980), a translation of Jin Ping Mei, was the sole exception; it was not translated directly from the original, but from an extant English-language translation. Nonetheless, according to the sinologist Leo Suryadinata, Kho showed great familiarity with the wuxia genre, with elements of works by Jin Yong, Ni Kuang, and Liang Yusheng identifiable in his output. Many such works were available in Indonesian translations, with noted examples by Oey Kim Tiang and Gan KL.

=== Social impact ===
According to Suryadinata, Kho popularized martial arts fiction amongst Indonesians, and the anthropologist Bill Watson describes Kho as the first name to come into Indonesians' minds when discussing the genre. Kho had thousands of readers of varied cultural, geographic, and socio-economic backgrounds, with the poet Emha Ainun Nadjib, Sultan Hamengkubuwono IX, politicians Soeharto and Joko Widodo, and religious leaders Abdurrahman Wahid and Ma'ruf Amin all identifying themselves as fans of his work. In its obituary, the newspaper Kompas wrote that Kho was better known to readers than most members of the Indonesian literary canon, and many youths sought to emulate Kho's heroes. Several indigenous writers, including Singgih Hadi Mintardja and Arswendo Atmowiloto, were inspired by Kho's output to produce their own silat literature; outside the genre, the novelist Eka Kurniawan has cited Kho as an influence. Despite his popularity, Kho has been marginalized in the history of Indonesian literature. (Note: This is common for works by Indonesian authors of Chinese heritage, particularly those written in the colonial era (Saraswati & Maziyah 2021, pp. 113–114). In his doctoral thesis, J. Francisco B. Benitez posits a socio-political cause for this. The Dutch colonial government used Court Malay as a "language of administration", a language for everyday dealings, while the Indonesian nationalists appropriated the language to help build a national culture. Chinese Malay literature, written in "low" Malay, was steadily marginalized (Benitez 2004, pp. 82–83). The literary critic Jakob Sumardjo, however, sees it as a question of classification: though vernacular Malay was the lingua franca of the time, it was not Indonesian, and as such, he asks whether works in vernacular Malay should be classified as local literature, Indonesian literature, or simply Chinese Malay literature (Sumardjo 1989, p. 100). Ajidarma (2012, pp. 115–117) argues that Kho's works were undeniably written in Indonesian and, despite the frequent use of Chinese settings, framed through an Indonesian mindset. Dismissing the need for a literary canon in modern historiography, he concludes that Kho should be recognized as part of Indonesian literature.)

Many of Kho's works were adapted to the stage, the Siswo Budoyo group being one of the most frequent performers. Adaptations were also broadcast by Radio Republik Indonesia, and several of Kho's novels were made into comics. Puppetry performances, including examples of wayang potehi (glove puppetry) and wacinwa (Javanese–Chinese fusion puppetry), have been based on his novels. Five of Kho's stories have been adapted to film: Dendam Si Anak Haram ('The Bastard's Revenge', 1972), Darah Daging ('Blood and Flesh', 1977), Buaian Asmara ('Drunk on Love', adapted as Cintaku Tergadai ['My Love, Sold', 1977]), Badai Laut Selatan ('Storm in the Southern Sea', 1991), and Perawan Lembah Wilis ('Maiden from the Green Valley', 1993). Kho was displeased with the film adaptations of his work, feeling that they had distorted his vision and become almost pornographic. Several stories have been adapted to television. As of 2020, Kho's books continue to be published by Gema, which distributes them to bookstores and has collaborated with outside parties in making animated adaptations.

Kho posthumously received several awards for his contributions to Indonesian literature, including from the regent of Sragen in 2005 and the Surakartan People's Association in 2012. In 2014, he was awarded the Satya Lencana Kebudayaan by President Susilo Bambang Yudhoyono. In December 2013, the first volume of Kho's Suling Emas ('The Golden Flute', 1968) was translated into Mandarin; sponsored by Imron Cotan, Indonesia's ambassador to China, this translation was handled by an Indonesian before being edited by a Chinese expert in wuxia stories. A museum dedicated to Kho has been planned for Sragen, though as of 2025 it had not been realized.

== Analysis ==
=== Language ===
Aside from the Javanese-language Lintang-Lintang Dadi Seksi ('The Stars Bear Witness', 1961), all of Kho's works were written in Indonesian. His early silat publications, including Pek Liong Po Kiam: Pedang Pusaka Naga Putih and Ang Coa Kiam: Pedang Ular Merah ('Sword of the Red Snake', 1962), were given Hokkien titles and Indonesian subtitles; (Note: Hokkien was the most commonly used Chinese language in Indonesia, having been a major language of publication since the 19th century. The use of Hokkien-language titles for works otherwise in Malay likewise has a long history in the region (Hoogervorst 2017, pp. 299, 301).) later works solely carried Indonesian-language titles. Kho often used Hokkien loanwords, generally those commonly understood by readers. which was unusual among contemporary Indonesian writers.

Watson writes that, in his early works, Kho used a style similar to indigenous writers such as M. Balfas and Idrus. According to the journalist and curator Ardus M. Sawega, Kho employed a simple and communicative style that followed the proscriptions of the Indonesian language, distinguishing him from the vernacular Malay used by earlier Chinese-Indonesian writers. The author Seno Gumira Ajidarma describes Kho's language as fluent, drawing readers into the fictional universe and keeping them enticed throughout. He argues that, through accessible language, Kho was readily able to create strong plots and characters. In their biography of Kho, Imada Imba Saraswati and Siti Maziyah of Diponegoro University argue that his language continued to evolve over time, influenced by the works of contemporaries such as Marga T, Ashadi Siregar, and Motinggo Busye.

=== Setting and characterization ===
The majority of Kho's works were set in China and used Chinese names for characters. (Note: According to figures released by Gema in 1995, Kho published 122 stories set in China and 41 set outside of China (Yatim 2012, p. 33). Meanwhile, Suryana, Krishnapatria & Mariamurti (2023, p. 255) give 127 stories set in China and 25 set in the Malay Archipelago.) Having only travelled to mainland China in 1985, he drew his inspiration predominantly from maps of the country, English- and Dutch-language texts on its history, and imported works of Hong Kong and Taiwanese cinema. Kho sought to integrate historical facts into his stories; for instance, according to the Indonesian literary critic Myra Sidharta, he was meticulous in detailing the fashions and hairstyles that were used as markers of social position. Nonetheless, he did make some errors in presenting the nation's history and geography.

For many Indonesian readers, Kho's novels were their primary source of information on Chinese culture, geography, and values, and this helped frame their understanding both of China and of Chinese Indonesians. At the time, the Suharto government was using legislative frameworks to repress Chinese culture while members of the diaspora were negotiating a collective identity. Consequently, the Indonesianist Abidin Kusno describes Kho's use of fantastical Chinese settings as an "appropriation of and collaboration with popular cultures from East Asia as a way to cope with the state's erasure of Chinese cultures from the public life".

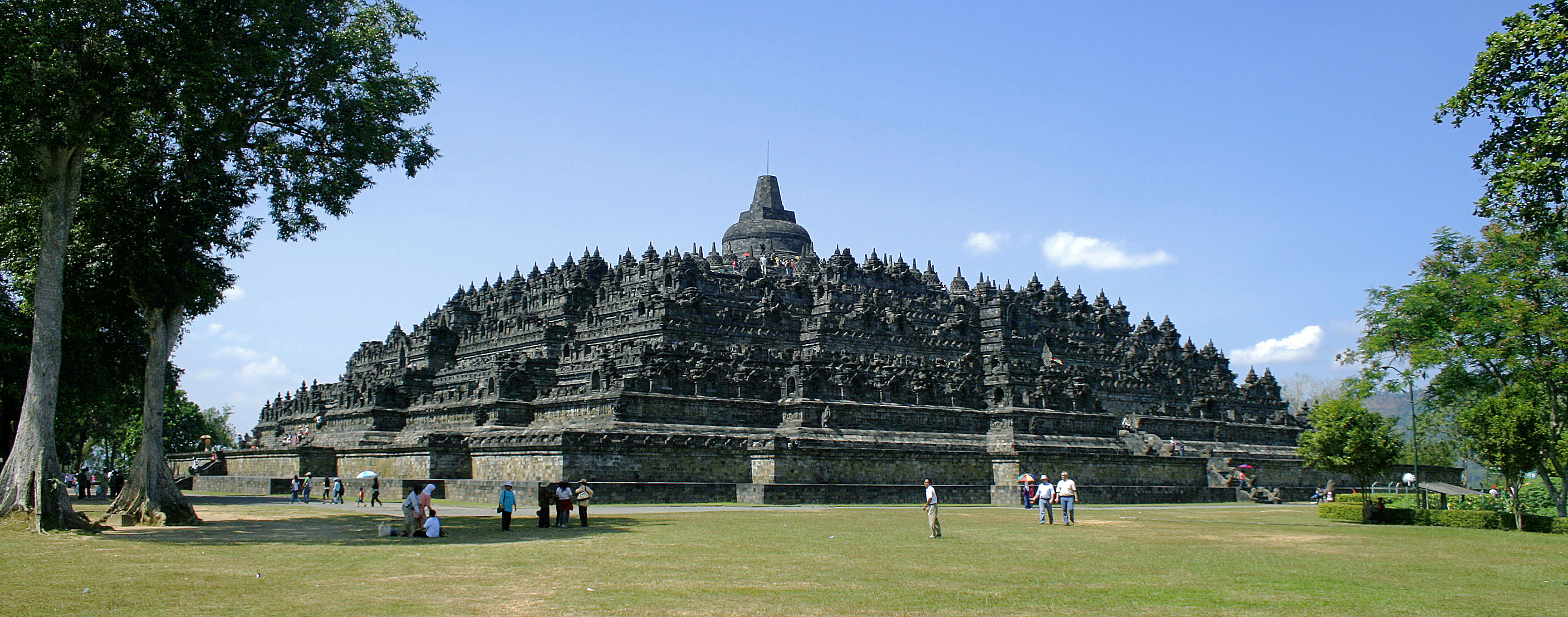
Borobudur, featured prominently in Kho's novel Darah Mengalir di Borobudur ('Blood Flows at Borobudur', 1961)

Dozens of Kho's stories were set in the Malay Archipelago, including not only his silat stories but also works of realist fiction. In accordance with genre conventions, his silat stories were primarily set in historical times, prior to the arrival of European colonialism. Stories taking place during the colonial era were mostly set in its early years. Kurniawan, exploring Kho's use of history in Kompas, notes that the novelist drew from diverse areas and eras in Indonesian history, including the Mataram and Singhasari Kingdoms. Likewise, various historical events featured in Kho's novels, including the building of Borobudur Temple, the arrival of Admiral Zheng He, and the military campaigns of Gajah Mada. According to Kurniawan, these well-known events provided a real-life context for fictional deeds.

Generally, Kho's silat stories dealt with members of the nobility, ksatria (warrior aristocrats) who leave the comforts of their palaces in search of excitement, knowledge, or vengeance. For example, the female protagonist in Bu Kek Siansu is a princess named Han Swat Hong who hunts her stepmother, The Kwat Ling, whom she blames for the collapse of her kingdom. A minority of characters were religious leaders, with the main character of Darah Mengalir di Borobudur being a Buddhist monk. Kurniawan argues that, despite this emphasis on the elites of society, Kho drew his characters into the realms of the lower classes, be they rural communities or natural environments, and thus associated his historical fiction with the common people.

=== Themes ===
Although Kho was best known for his martial arts stories, he also published historical fiction as well as detective, spy, and love stories. His early short stories such as "Sosiawan Besar" ('The Great Philanthropist', c. 1960) highlighted the injustices of 1950s Indonesia and provided social criticism, and his later silat stories continued to show solidarity with the oppressed while condemning corruption. Sidharta, for instance, notes that Darah Mengalir di Borobudur included segments exploring the suffering of the labourers who built the temple. Some stories set in Indonesia, such as Geger Solo ('The Solo Incident', 1966), explored the effects of contemporary events on their characters.

Buddhism and Hinduism, which were the primary religions of pre-colonial Indonesia, are prominent in Kho's archipelago-set silat stories. Several used religious themes as part of their conflict. In Sepasang Garuda Putih ('A Pair of White Garuda', 1988), for instance, a village's temple to the Trimurti is replaced by the Shivite antagonist with individual temples to Shiva, Durga, and Kala. Kurniawan notes that, despite these conflicts, Kho was careful to attribute the misdeeds of antagonists to their abuse of power rather than religious teachings. Confucian values are incorporated into works set in China, and Kusno notes several works with extensive discussion of Taoist philosophies. Nonetheless, according to Sawega these stories too were framed through an Indonesian mindset.

Kho used several of his novels to emphasize that the ethnic Chinese have long been part of Indonesian society, presenting values of acculturation and assimilation. According to Sidharta, his Kilat Pedang Membela Cinta ('The Flashing Sword Defends Love', 1982), which featured Admiral Zheng He and his companion Ma Huan, showed that the Chinese were familiar with Islam—the majority religion of the modern archipelago. Other stories highlighted Chinese Indonesians' contributions to the defence of indigenous kingdoms and opposition to colonial oppression. She surmises that, through his writings, Kho sought to challenge stereotypes that Chinese Indonesians were dishonest brokers seeking only self-enrichment. Kusno identifies resistance to dominant Indonesian narratives about Chineseness in Kho's writing.

In his novels, Kho also presented intermarriages between ethnic Chinese characters and indigenous elites as common. For example, Suryadinata notes that Kilat Pedang Membela Cinta features a love-based intermarriage between the Chinese martial artist Ong Cun and the indigenous woman Damini. The novel concludes with a discussion that emphasizes Kho's belief in the benefits of such marriages. Similarly, several of Kho's stories set in contemporary Indonesia depicted romantic relationships between Chinese and non-Chinese characters. The romance Siane (1981), for example, followed a peranakan girl and Javanese boy. According to Kho's daughter Tina Asmaraman, he believed that love conquered all, and thus could provide a solution to many of society's woes.

== Works cited ==
- Aditya, Dimas Krisna; Putra, I Dewa Alit Dwija; Desintha, Siti; Lawe, I Gusti Agung Rangga; Kusmayanti, Ima Normalia. "Reimagining Wacinwa: Transforming a Chinese Javanese Puppet Tradition into a Modular Visual Storytelling System through Wuxia Narrative". Journal of Chinese Overseas. 21 (2): 293–329. doi:10.1163/17932548-12341538 (inactive 2 September 2026).
- Ajidarma, Seno Gumira (2012). "Kho Ping Hoo dan Indonesia: Catatan Ringkas" [Kho Ping Hoo dan Indonesia: A Short Note]. In Sawega, Ardus M. (ed.). Seniman dan Karyanya: Kho Ping Hoo & Indonesia [An Artist and His Works: Kho Ping Hoo & Indonesia] (in Indonesian). Surakarta: Balai Soedjatmoko. pp. 103–117. ISBN 978-602-18685-1-5.
- Ajie, Stefanus (27 January 2020). "Kho Ping Hoo's Legendary Tales of Martial Arts Live On". The Jakarta Post. Archived from the original on 2 September 2026.
- Atmowiloto, Arswendo; Sawega, Ardus M.; Darmawan T, Agus (2012). "Asmaraman KPH". In Sawega, Ardus M. (ed.). Seniman dan Karyanya: Kho Ping Hoo & Indonesia [An Artist and His Works: Kho Ping Hoo & Indonesia] (in Indonesian). Surakarta: Balai Soedjatmoko. pp. 13–21. ISBN 978-602-18685-1-5.
- "Asmaraman Kho Ping Hoo". Kompas (in Indonesian). Jakarta. 12 April 1981. pp. 1, 10.
- Benitez, J. Francisco B. (2004). Awit and Syair: Alternative Subjectivities and Multiple Modernities in Nineteenth Century Insular Southeast Asia (PhD thesis). Madison: University of Wisconsin. (subscription required)
- Cheah, Pheng (2017). "Worlding Literature". Diacritics. 45 (2): 86–114. doi:10.1353/dia.2017.0008. JSTOR 26776635.
- Hoogervorst, Tom G. (2017). "What Kind of Language was 'Chinese Malay' in Late Colonial Java?". Indonesia and the Malay World. 45 (133): 294–314. doi:10.1080/13639811.2017.1340030.
- "Kho Ping Hoo (1926–1994)". Ensiklopedia Sastra Indonesia (in Indonesian). Ministry of Education and Culture. Archived from the original on 30 August 2026.
- Kusno, Abidin (2016). Visual Cultures of the Ethnic Chinese in Indonesia. New York: Bloomsbury Publishing USA. ISBN 979-8-216-21771-8.
- "Kisah Kho Ping Hoo" [The Story of Kho Ping Hoo]. Tempo (in Indonesian). Vol. 10, no. 41. 6 December 1980. p. 13.
- Kurniawan, Eka (1 December 2006). "Sejarah dalam Cerita Silat Kho Ping Hoo" [History in the Silat Stories of Kho Ping Hoo]. Kompas (in Indonesian). Jakarta. p. 38.
- Mannan, Achmad Ghiffary (24 July 2025). "31 Tahun Kepergian Kho Ping Hoo: Penulis Cerita Silat Populer yang Tak Bisa Silat" [31st Anniversary of the Death of Kho Ping Hoo: The Popular Silat Writer who Knew No Martial Arts]. Tempo (in Indonesian). Archived from the original on 29 August 2026.
- Matra (2012). "Kho Ping Hoo & Karyanya" [Kho Ping Hoo & His Works]. In Sawega, Ardus M. (ed.). Seniman dan Karyanya: Kho Ping Hoo & Indonesia [An Artist and His Works: Kho Ping Hoo & Indonesia] (in Indonesian). Surakarta: Balai Soedjatmoko. pp. 71–76. ISBN 978-602-18685-1-5.
- Pattisina, Edna C. (20 March 2021). "Kebangsaan: Mencintai Indonesia seperti Kho Ping Hoo" [Nationhood: Loving Indonesia like Kho Ping Hoo]. Kompas (in Indonesian). p. 2.
- Rejeki, Sri (31 January 2008). "Bunawan, Melestarikan Legenda Kho Ping Hoo" [Bunawan, Preserving the Legend of Kho Ping Hoo]. Kompas (in Indonesian). Jakarta. p. 1.
- Rizal, Jawahir Gustav; Nugroho, Rizal Setyo (22 July 2020). "Mengenang Kho Ping Hoo, Penulis Cerita Silat Legendaris Indonesia..." [In Memoriam: Kho Ping Hoo, Legendary Silat Story Author]. Kompas (in Indonesian). Archived from the original on 22 July 2020.
- Safutra, Ilham (17 August 2019). "Mengenang Penulis Cerita Silat Legendaris Asmaraman Kho Ping Hoo (1)" [In Memoriam: Legendary Silat Story Author Kho Ping Hoo (1)]. Jawa Pos (in Indonesian). Surabaya. Archived from the original on 17 June 2024.
- Salmon, Claudine (1981). Literature in Malay by the Chinese of Indonesia: A Provisional Annotated Bibliography. Paris: Editions de la Maison des sciences de l'homme. ISBN 9780835705929.
- Saptono, Hariadi (2012). "'Pendekar' Itu Ditangisi Penggemarnya" [The 'Warrior' Mourned by His Fans]. In Sawega, Ardus M. (ed.). Seniman dan Karyanya: Kho Ping Hoo & Indonesia [An Artist and His Works: Kho Ping Hoo & Indonesia] (in Indonesian). Surakarta: Balai Soedjatmoko. pp. 27–29. ISBN 978-602-18685-1-5.
- Saraswati, Imada Imba; Maziyah, Siti (2021). "Pendekar Cerita Silat dari Bumi Sukowati: Biografi Kho Ping Hoo Tahun 1960–2014" [The Martial Arts Story Warrior from the Land of Sukowati: A Biography of Kho Ping Hoo, 1960–2014]. Historiografi (in Indonesian). 2 (2): 108–107.
- Sawega, Ardus M. (22 July 1994). "Asmaraman Kho Ping Hoo: "Saya Telah Iklas Pergi ..."" [Asmaraman Kho Ping Hoo: "I've Accepted My Departure ..."]. Kompas (in Indonesian). Jakarta. p. 20.
- Sanda, Abun (2012). "Menentang Ketidakadilan ala Kho Ping Hoo" [Opposing Injustice a la Kho Ping Hoo]. In Sawega, Ardus M. (ed.). Seniman dan Karyanya: Kho Ping Hoo & Indonesia [An Artist and His Works: Kho Ping Hoo & Indonesia] (in Indonesian). Surakarta: Balai Soedjatmoko. pp. 195–201. ISBN 978-602-18685-1-5.
- Sawega, Ardus M. (2012). "Kho Ping Hoo, Sastra Kontekstual, dan Multikulturalisme" [Kho Ping Hoo, Contextual Literature, and Multiculturalism]. In Sawega, Ardus M. (ed.). Seniman dan Karyanya: Kho Ping Hoo & Indonesia [An Artist and His Works: Kho Ping Hoo & Indonesia] (in Indonesian). Surakarta: Balai Soedjatmoko. pp. 7–11. ISBN 978-602-18685-1-5.
- Stenberg, Josh (2015). "Wayang Potehi: Glove Puppets in the EWxpression of Sino-Indonesian identity". Journal of Southeast Asian Studies. 46 (3): 391–416. doi:10.1017/S0022463415000314.
- Sidharta, Myra (1994). "Asmaraman Sukowati Kho Ping Hoo (b. 1926): Writer of Cloak-and-dagger Stories in Indonesia". Archipel. 48: 157–176. doi:10.3406/arch.1994.3007.
- Sidharta, Myra (2012). "Kho Ping Hoo". In Suryadinata, Leo (ed.). Southeast Asian Personalities of Chinese Descent: A Biographical Dictionary. Singapore: Institute of Southeast Asian Studies. pp. 406–408. ISBN 978-981-4345-21-7.
- Suryadinata, Leo (2012). "Kho Ping Hoo dan Karya-Karyanya" [Kho Ping Hoo and His Works]. In Sawega, Ardus M. (ed.). Seniman dan Karyanya: Kho Ping Hoo & Indonesia [An Artist and His Works: Kho Ping Hoo & Indonesia] (in Indonesian). Surakarta: Balai Soedjatmoko. pp. 41–52. ISBN 978-602-18685-1-5.
- Sumardjo, Jakob (1989). "Kwee Tek Hoay Sebagai Sastrawan" [Kwee Tek Hoay as a Man of Letters]. In Sidharta, Myra (ed.). 100 Tahun Kwee Tek Hoay: Dari Penjaja Tekstil sampai ke Pendekar Pena [100 Years of Kwee Tek Hoay: From Textile Peddler to Pen-Wielding Warrior] (in Indonesian). Jakarta: Sinar Harapan. pp. 89–121. ISBN 978-979-416-040-4.
- Suryadinata, Leo, ed. (2015). "Kho Ping Hoo". Prominent Indonesian Chinese: Biographical Sketches (4th ed.). Singapore: Institute of Southeast Asian Studies. pp. 94–96. ISBN 978-981-4345-21-7.
- Suryana, Nana; Krishnapatria, Kriswanda; Mariamurti, Prima Agustina (2023). "Sistem dan Model Produksi Buku Cerita Silat Karya Asmaraman S. Kho Ping Hoo: Sebuah Perspektif Sosiologi Sastra" [Book Production Systems and Models of the Silat Stories by Asmaraman S. Kho Ping Hoo: A Sociology of Literature Perspective]. Metahumaniora (in Indonesian). 13 (3): 252–261. doi:10.24198/metahumaniora.v13i3.50920.
- Sutyastomo, Yunanto (2012). "Kisah Jari-jari yang Sakit Waktu Kanak" [A Story of Sore Fingers in Childhood]. Seniman dan Karyanya: Kho Ping Hoo & Indonesia [An Artist and His Works: Kho Ping Hoo & Indonesia] (in Indonesian). Surakarta: Balai Soedjatmoko. pp. 127–129. ISBN 978-602-18685-1-5.
- Watson, C.W. (2017). "An Early Story of Kho Ping Hoo" (PDF). Wacana. 18 (2): 540–555. doi:10.17510/wacana.v18i2.595. Archived from the original on 29 August 2026.
- Wresti, M. Clara (29 January 2014). "Kho Ping Hoo Satukan Indonesia dan China" [Kho Ping Hoo United Indonesia and China]. Kompas (in Indonesian). Jakarta. p. 41.
- Yatim, Ricardo I. (2012). "Pesilat dari Mertokusuman" [The Martial Artist from Mertokusuman]. In Sawega, Ardus M. (ed.). Seniman dan Karyanya: Kho Ping Hoo & Indonesia [An Artist and His Works: Kho Ping Hoo & Indonesia] (in Indonesian). Surakarta: Balai Soedjatmoko. pp. 31–40. ISBN 978-602-18685-1-5.
