= The Book of Swindles =

1617 Chinese short story collection about fraud

The Book of Swindles (Piàn jīng 騙經), also known by its longer title, A New Book for Foiling Swindlers, Based on Worldly Experience (Jiānghú lìlǎn dùpiàn xīnshū 江湖歷覽杜騙新書), is said to be the first published and printed Chinese short story collection about fraud. Written and compiled by Zhang Yingyu (張應俞), a man who lived in the early to mid 16th-century, it was published in Fujian province in or around 1617, and most of its stories are set during the latter part of the Ming dynasty.

To each story the author adds a commentary that offers a moral lesson. In some cases, Yingyu even notes the cleverness of the con while pointing out the foolishness of its victim.

Modern editions have been entitled both The Book Against Swindles (Fan Pian Jing 反骗经) and The Book of Swindles (Pian jing 骗经). A selected English translation, The Book of Swindles: Selections from a Late Ming Collection, translated by Christopher Rea and Bruce Rusk, was published by Columbia University Press in 2017. A follow-up English language edition, titled More Swindles from the Late Ming: Sex, Scams, and Sorcery, translated by Christopher Rea and Bruce Rusk, was published by Columbia University Press in 2024.

== Background and themes ==
The first edition of 1617 has the full title A New Book for Foiling Swindlers, Based on Worldly Experience (Jianghu lilan dupian xinshu), suggesting that it is a guide to negotiating the risky world of the traveling merchant.

== Types of swindle ==
The Book of Swindles is divided into twenty-four categories of swindle:

1. Misdirection and Theft
2. The Bag Drop
3. Money Changing
4. Misrepresentation
5. False Relations
6. Brokers
7. Enticement to Gambling
8. Showing Off Wealth
9. Scheming for Wealth
10. Robbery
11. Violence
12. On Boats
13. Poetry
14. Fake Silver
15. Government Underlings
16. Marriage
17. Illicit Passion
18. Women
19. Kidnapping
20. Corruption in Education
21. Monks and Priests
22. Alchemy
23. Sorcery
24. Pandering

== Author ==
Zhang Yingyu, style name Kui Zhong (夔衷), is an obscure figure. The Book of Swindles is the only known work to appear under his name, and no other records of him are known. A note on the title page of one Ming dynasty copy claims that he was from Zhejiang province, while a 1617 preface says that he was from Fujian.

== Relationship with other literary works and genres ==
The Book of Swindles incorporates elements from a variety of other Chinese genres, especially court case (gong'an) fiction, in which a capable magistrate solves a crime. Stories involving sorcerers, Buddhist monks, and Daoist priests, who engage in alchemy or dream spirit possession, include motifs from supernatural tales. Other stories, featuring suspense, surprise and revelation, resemble jokes in structure. A minority include apocryphal anecdotes about historical figures.

Other works of fiction from the same time period, such as stories by Feng Menglong (1574–1645), Ling Mengchu (1580–1644), and Li Yu (1610–80), as well as novels such as The Water Margin (Shui hu zhuan) and Plum in the Golden Vase (Jin ping mei), feature accounts of similar scenarios of deception and trickery. Collections of swindle stories can also be found in contemporary China.
