= Chronicles of the Eastern Zhou Kingdoms =

Chinese historical novel by Feng Menglong

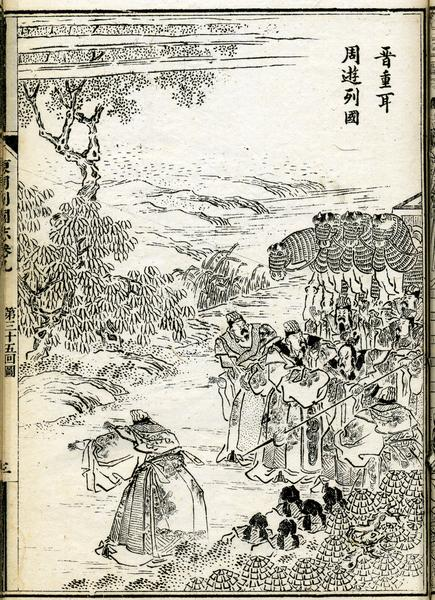
- Illustration from a printed edition of the novel
- Author: Feng Menglong
- Original title: 東周列國志
- Language: Chinese
- Subject: Ancient China
- Genre: Fictionalized history
- Publication place: China
- Media type: Print

Chronicles of the Eastern Zhou Kingdoms

Chinese name
- Traditional Chinese: 東周列國志
- Simplified Chinese: 东周列国志
Transcriptions
Standard Mandarin
- Hanyu Pinyin: Dōngzhōu Lièguó Zhì

Vietnamese name
- Vietnamese alphabet: Đông Chu liệt quốc chí
- Chữ Hán: 東周列國志

Korean name
- Hangul: 동주열국지
- Hanja: 東周列國志

Japanese name
- Kanji: 東周列国志
- Hiragana: とうしゅうれっこくし
Transcriptions
- Romanization: Toshurekkokushi

The Chronicles of the Eastern Zhou Kingdoms (simplified Chinese: 东周列国志; traditional Chinese: 東周列國志; pinyin: Dōngzhōu Lièguó Zhì) is a Chinese historical novel in 108 chapters written by Feng Menglong in the late Ming dynasty. Set in the Eastern Zhou dynasty, the novel starts from the Chinese kingdom beginning to break apart into smaller states and ends with the first unification of the land accomplished by Qin Shi Huang.

It is one of the best-known historical novels regarding ancient China. The novel based its sources from classic texts such as the Zuo Tradition and the Records of the Grand Historian and some of the sacred classic books of China such as the Book of Rites and the Classic of Poetry.

Pages from a printed edition of the novel Chronicles of the East Zhou Kingdoms

Pages from a printed edition of the novel Chronicles of the East Zhou Kingdoms

Pages from a printed edition of the novel Chronicles of the East Zhou Kingdoms

== Translations ==
The novel has been translated into several languages, including Korean, Thai and Vietnamese. The Korean version was done in 2003. The Thai version was done in 1819 by a committee of senior public officers at the behest of King Rama II. The Vietnamese version was done in 1933 by Nguyễn Đỗ Mục.

Erik Honobe has translated the first ten chapters into English (The Rise of Lord Zhuang of Zheng, ISBN 978-962-7255-48-2). Some chapters can be viewed on the website of Renditions: Chapter 1 and Chapter 5.

Olivia Milburn translated 17 out of the original 108 chapters into English. This translation was published as an abridged version of the novel in 2022 (Kingdoms in Peril: A Novel of the Ancient Chinese World at War, ISBN 9780520380516). In 2023, the fully-translated version was published in four volumes.
