= Quwei Jiuwen =

Chinese history book

Quwei Jiuwen (曲洧舊聞, "Old Stories from Quwei") is a Chinese biji-style history book written by the Song dynasty diplomat Zhu Bian during his captivity in Jurchen-ruled Jin dynasty territory. He finished the book in 1138, and brought it back to his country in 1143, a year before his death.

Zhu Bian volunteered for a diplomatic mission to Jin in 1127 to visit the captured Song emperors Emperor Qinzong and Emperor Huizong, but he was detained and not allowed to return until 1143. He was humiliated but remained loyal to the Song. It was during this period that he wrote Quwei Jiuwen based on what he had heard during his youth in Quwei (modern Xinzheng), where he lived before the Jurchens invaded.

Quwei Jiuwen in 10 chapters contains many stories about the Song emperors and their subjects. In particular, Zhu Bian blamed the decline and fall of Northern Song on the policies of Wang Anshi and Cai Jing. Quwei Jiuwen also contains his personal experience with Buddhism, as well as notes on poetry and supernatural stories.
