= Stories Old and New =

Book by Feng Menglong

Gu Jin Xiaoshuo
- Author: Feng Menglong (editor)
- Language: Written Chinese
- Genre: Short story anthology
- Publication date: 1620
- Publication place: Ming dynasty
- Followed by: Stories to Caution the World

Stories Old and New
- Traditional Chinese: 古今小說
- Simplified Chinese: 古今小说
Transcriptions
Standard Mandarin
- Hanyu Pinyin: gǔjīn xiǎoshuō

Alternative Chinese name
- Chinese: 喻世明言
Transcriptions
Standard Mandarin
- Hanyu Pinyin: yù shì míngyán

Stories Old and New, also known by its later name Stories to Enlighten the World (喻世明言), is a collection of short stories by Feng Menglong during the Ming dynasty. It was published in Suzhou in 1620. It is considered to be pivotal in the development of Chinese vernacular fiction.

== Background ==
Feng Menglong collected and slightly modified works from the Song, Yuan, and Ming dynasties, such as changing characters' names and locations to make stories more contemporary. The writing style of the series of stories is written vernacular, or baihua, people's everyday language at that time. The 40 stories are divided into three sections, one section collects Song and Yuan dynasty tales, one collects Ming dynasty stories, and the last is the stories created by Feng Menglong himself. The success of Stories Old and New published (1620), also known as Yushi Mingyan (Illustrious Words to Instruct the World), led Feng to edit and publish Jingshi Tongyan (Stories to Caution the World) in 1624, and Xingshi Hengyan (Stories to Awaken the World) in 1627. Each collection contained forty stories. The title of each collection ended with the word "yan" (word), so they are often referred to as a group: Sanyan (Trois Recueils d'histoires). The stories in these three books are in a format called Huaben (话本), a novella or short novel.

== About the author ==
Feng Menglong (1574－1646) passed the lowest level of national exams at 57. Although he had not done well on previous exams, he did have the ability to impress people with his writing. When he was 70, the dynasty almost ended, and the Qing army invaded the country. He attempted to awaken people with his writings but failed to do so and died in 1646. There are two theories about how he died. One is that he was killed by the Qing forces, and another is that his worries about the country made him sick.

Feng's works included fiction, drama, and music. He played a major role in enhancing Ming dynasty drama and bringing it into a thriving state. Nevertheless, he was mostly known for his fiction. The motivation and central idea of his work were illustrating real emotion and undermining false ethics. One common characteristic of Feng's works is realism, dealing with daily life so that readers feel close to the story and enjoy reading it.

== List of Stories ==
Translated titles in this table mainly follow those by Shuhui Yang and Yunqin Yang in Stories Old and New: A Ming Dynasty Collection. University of Washington Press. 2000. ISBN 978-0295978444. Titles used by other translators are listed as bullet points.

#	Title(s) of English Translation(s)	Chinese Title	Notes
1	"Jiang Xingge Reencounters His Pearl Shirt": Birch 1958: "The Pearl-sewn Shirt"; Kelly 1978: "The Pearl Shirt Reencountered"	蔣興哥重會珍珠衫	
2	"Censor Chen Ingeniously Solves the Case of the Gold Hairpins and Brooches": Chu 1929: "The Clever Judgment of Censor Chen Lien"; Yao 1975: "The Case of the Gold Hairpins"	陳御史巧勘金釵鈿	
3	"Han the Fifth Sells Her Charms in New Bridge Town": Bishop 1956: "Chin-nu Sells Love at Newbridge"; Miller et al. 1978: "Han Wu-niang Sells Her Charms at the New Bridge Market"	新橋市韓五賣春情	
4	"Ruan San Redeems His Debt in Leisurely Clouds Nunnery"	閑雲庵阮三償冤債	
5	"Penniless Ma Zhou Meets His Opportunity through a Woman Selling Pancakes": Birch 1958: "Wine and Dumplings"	窮馬周遭際賣䭔媼	
6	"Lord Ge Gives Away Pearl Maiden"	葛令公生遣弄珠兒	
7	"Yang Jiao'ai Lays Down His Life for the Sake of Friendship": Dolby 1976: "Yang Jiao Throws Away His Life in Fulfilment of a Friendship"	羊角哀捨命全交	
8	"Wu Bao'an Abandons His Family to Ransom, His Friend": Birch 1958: "The Journey of the Corpse"; Kwan-Terry 1978: "Wu Pao-an Ransoms His Friend"	吳保安棄家贖友	
9	"Duke Pei of Jin Returns a Concubine to Her Rightful Husband"	裴晉公義還原配	
10	"Magistrate Teng Settles the Case of Inheritance with Ghostly Cleverness": Yang & Yang 1957: "The Hidden Will"; Zonana et al. 1978: "Magistrate T'eng and the Case of Inheritance"	滕大尹鬼斷家私	
11	"Zhao Bosheng Meets with Emperor Renzong in a Teahouse"	趙伯升茶肆遇仁宗	
12	"The Courtesans Mourn Liu the Seventh in the Spring Breeze"	眾名姬春風弔柳七	
13	"Zhang Daoling Tests Zhao Sheng Seven Times"	張道陵七試趙昇	
14	"Chen Xiyi Rejects Four Appointments from the Imperial court"	陳希夷四辭朝命	
15	"The Dragon-and-Tiger Reunion of Shi Hongzhao the Minister and his Friend the King"	史弘肇龍虎君臣會	
16	"The Chicken-and-Millet Dinner for Fan Juqing, Friend in Life and Death": Bishop 1956: "Fan Chü-ch'ing's Eternal Friendship"	范巨卿雞黍死生交	
17	"Shan Fulang's Happy Marriage in Quanzhou"	單符郎全州佳偶	
18	"Yang Balao's Extraordinary Family Reunion in the Land of Yue": Yang & Yang 1981: "The Strange Adventures of Yang Balao"	楊八老越國奇逢	
19	"Yang Qianzhi Meets a Monk Knight-Errant on a Journey by Boat"	楊謙之客舫遇俠僧	
20	"Chen Congshan Loses His Wife on Mei Ridge"	陳從善梅嶺失渾家	
21	"Qian Poliu Begins His Career in Lin'an"	臨安里錢婆留發跡	
22	"Zheng Huchen Seeks Revenge in Mumian Temple"	木綿庵鄭虎臣報冤	
23	"Zhang Shunmei Finds a Fair Lady during the Lantern Festival"	張舜美燈宵得麗女	
24	"Yang Siwen Meets an Old Acquaintance in Yanshan": Yang & Yang 1961: "Strange Encounter in the Northern Capital"	楊思溫燕山逢故人	
25	"Yan Pingzhong Kills Three Men with Two Peaches"	晏平仲二桃殺三士	
26	"Shen Xiu Causes Seven Deaths with One Bird": Bishop 1956: "Master Shen's Bird Destroys Seven Lives"; Birch 1958: "The Canary Murders"	沈小官一鳥害七命	
27	"Jin Yunu Beats the Heartless Man": Yang & Yang 1957: "The Beggar Chief's Daughter"; Birch 1958: "The Lady Who Was a Beggar"	金玉奴棒打薄情郎	
28	"Li Xiuqing Marries the Virgin Huang with Honor"	李秀卿義結黃貞女	
29	"Monk Moon Bright Redeems Willow Green"	月明和尚度柳翠	
30	"Abbot Mingwu Redeems Abbot Wujie"	明悟禪師趕五戒	
31	"Sima Mao Disrupts Order in the Underworld and Sits in Judgement"	鬧陰司司馬貌斷獄	
32	"Humu Di Intones Poems and Visits the Netherworld"	游酆都胡母迪吟詩	
33	"Old Man Zhang Grows Melons and Marries Wennu": Birch 1958: "The Fairy's Rescue"	張古老種瓜娶文女	
34	"Mr. Li Saves a Snake and Wins Chenxin"	李公子救蛇獲稱心	
35	"The Monk with a Note Cleverly Tricks Huangfu's Wife": Yang & Yang 1957: "The Monk's Billet-doux"	簡帖僧巧騙皇甫妻	
36	"Song the Fourth Greatly Torments Tightwad Zhang": Wong 1978: "Sung the Fourth Raises Hell with Tightwad Chang"	宋四公大鬧禁魂張	
37	"Emperor Wudi of the Liang Dynasty Goes to the Land of Extreme Bliss through Ceaseless Cultivation"	梁武帝累修成佛	
38	"Ren the Filial Son with a Fiery Disposition Becomes a God"	任孝子烈性為神	
39	"Wang Xinzhi Dies to Save the Entire Family": Hsia & Page 1985: "Wang Xinzhi's Death, and How It Saved His Whole Family"	汪信之一死救全家	
40	"Shen Xiaoxia Encounters the Expedition Memorials": Yang & Yang 1957: "A Just Man Avenges"	沈小霞相會出師表	
