= Slapping the Table in Amazement =

Collections of short stories

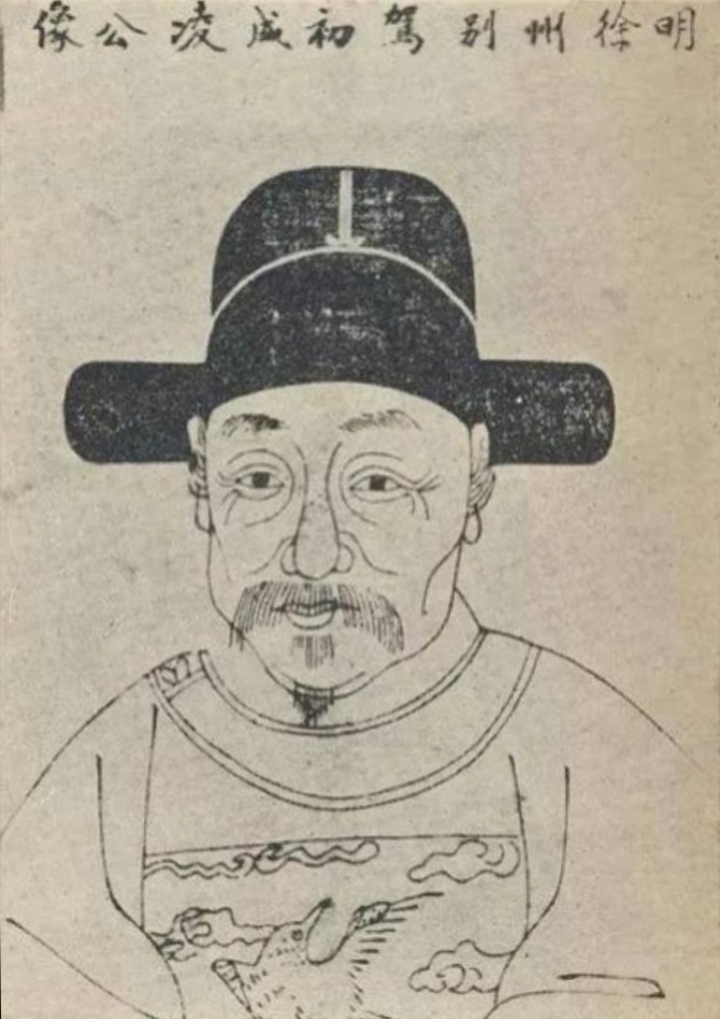
Portrait of the author Ling Mengchu

Pages from Slapping the Table in Amazement I (初刻拍案驚奇), volume 3

Pages from Slapping the Table in Amazement II (二刻拍案驚奇), volume 3

Slapping the Table in Amazement I (Chinese: 初刻拍案驚奇) and Slapping the Table in Amazement II (Chinese: 二刻拍案驚奇), both often collectively referred to as Two Slaps for short (Er Pai, Chinese: 二拍), also translated into English as Amazing Tales and Amazing Tales: Second Series, are collections of vernacular short stories, written by Ling Mengchu (1580–1644). It was composed in the 17th century during the end of the Ming dynasty, with Slapping the Table in Amazement I finished in 1627 and published in 1628, and Slapping the Table in Amazement II published in 1632. It involves 80 stories in all and is divided into two collections: the first Slap and the second Slap. There are forty stories in each collection. Slapping the Table in Amazement contains many different stories, such as folk legends, romances and unofficial history.

Thanks to the prosperity of the commodity economy and social progress. Er Pai expresses mercantilism, and open values of love and marriage. At the same time, there are many outdated ideas in this book, such as feudalism and superstition, comeuppance and ideas of fatalism, along with some explicit love scenes. Moreover, the author attacked the peasant uprisings toward the end of Ming dynasty in some articles. The novel is remarkable not only for its stunning storylines but also for its precise and detailed observation of the life and social structures typical of 17th-century Chinese aristocracy.

Er Pai together with the three masterpieces of Feng Menglong (1574–1646; a Chinese vernacular writer and poet of the late Ming dynasty) is called San Yan Er Pai. They are representative works of the vernacular short stories of the Ming dynasty. San Yan is distinguished by its strong artistic charm, while Er Pai vividly describes public life and expresses civil consciousness.

== Early copies ==
The original print of this volume has been lost, however, the earliest and most complete print copy (尚友堂刊本, missing the 23rd episode) is located in a temple in Japan (日本栃木県日光市輪王寺慈眼堂). Amazing Tales-Second series, urged by Ling's publican and published after completion in 1932, contains 39 stand-alone short stories (1 from Chunqiu Time, 14 from the Song dynasty, 3 from the Yuan dynasty, 19 from the Ming dynasty, and the final 2 remained unknown) and 1 performance script (Zaju, a type of performance originated in Tang dynasty). Due to the loss of the 23rd episode in the first volume, modern publicans replaced it with the same numeric numbered episode from the second volume, when combined, the two volumes together contain a total of 78 short stories plus 1 performance script. Note that the English publicans only translated a few so-found the greatest-hit episodes in each volume, and their commercial release is not a complete collection of the Er Pai.

== Artistic features ==
Slapping the Table in Amazement vividly represented life at that time, created in 1627. The sales volume reached an all-time high. In art, he by the succinct writing style, has portrayed vivid characters, and narrated twists and turns of details. He thought: people nowadays just know that ghosts and monsters, which can't be seen or heard, were astounding. But they ignore that, in our daily life there are many spooky things, which can be detected but can't be explained with common sense. Capturing extraordinary things in ordinary life, by absorbing readers, is the key to his success.

“script for story-telling (话本)" originated from “story-telling (说话)" in the Tang dynasty, which means telling stories, and it prevailed in the Song dynasty. Script for story-telling played as the outline of the story for the storyteller to tell the whole story to the audience. The readers and listeners were all common people, so it was the literature catered to ordinary people. “Er Pai”, as a vernacular novel, was closer to public life and ideas at that time He expressed his profound ideas about society in a vivid way. What is more, opposition to the shackles of personality and praise of the pursuit of the young for love are the themes.

Based on the foundation of traditional aesthetics, "Er Pai" also keeps on trying to explore the new way of art. It has shown a unique, individual artistic face, that makes itself a treasure of ancient colloquial short stories. The novel is composed in written vernacular Chinese rather than classical Chinese.

== Involved in ==
Ancient narrative literature, like Medieval Literature, describes the emperor and hero's deeds. While, in many chapters of Er Pai, the most described are the merchants of Huizhou, people carrying loads, hawkers, prostitutes, people who are playing Chinese chess, thieves, and much lower figures. It reflects the new change in social ethics with the development of the commodity economy. It also describes the licentious stories of many Taoists and Buddhists. The author put emphasis on the social effect of his work. He selected material from the common events in public life, so as to reveal the true and the false and ugly. In such a society of that time where there was more evil than good, it helped people to get psychological balance, when they found in the novel that bad people did not get good results. For example, in the very beginning of the eighth volume: People are all afraid of robbers, but it's a pity that everywhere we can find them. If an official does not correctly use his power, bringing calamity to the country and people, while enjoying a high salary, isn't he a robber? That's why his work was so popular among the ordinary people.

== Structure ==
In Chinese ancient literature, the meaning of the existence of every single person can be confessed only by his social relationships. For all his psychologies, wills, and desires are considered into a common framework, it is hard to describe anything extraordinary about the cockles of the heart of a hero. Therefore, a passport to an excellent character is to depict actions, instead of depicting psychological processes. Placing emphasis on plots, drawing figures’ descriptions in a straightforward style, and focusing attention on complex stories, are important marks of Chinese ancient novels and stories. When it comes to structure, usually, the beginning and the ending are corresponding with each other. The appearance of a character is always accompanied by introductions of his place of origin and personal identity, and his parents’ origins and identities. In the end, the author would clear the endings of the hero and his offspring. Almost all of this literature is aimed at expressing the theme, plots unfold in sequence, ignoring falling into the stereotypes.

== About San Yan and Er Pai ==
Slapping the Table in Amazement I and Slapping the Table in Amazement II by Ling Mengchu (凌濛初) in thought and artistic style tendency are the same. People used to call these two books "Er Pai". The "Er Pai" as eponymous as the "San Yan" (three books of Feng MengLong (冯梦龙): Yu Shi Ming Yan (喻世明言), Jing Shi Tong Yan (警世通言), Xing Shi Heng Yan (醒世恒言)). "Er Pai" was made a big difference by "San Yan". Withal, Ling Mengchu made no attempt to conceal the truth, he said:" works only by Feng Menglong were the most artistic, and broke corrupt customs of the society in that time. " Ling Mengchu wrote "Er Pai" as well as broke corrupt customs of the society in that time.

"Er Pai" and "San Yan" are still different. "San Yan" collected and processed scripts for story-telling (in Song, Yuan and Ming dynasty folk literature). Though there were scripts of Feng MengLong in San Yan, the proportion was very small."Er Pai" mainly written by Ling MengChu. His works were abbreviated and based on fact, but more lively and decorative than "San Yan".

== Translations ==
- In the Inner Quarters: Erotic Stories from Ling Mengchu's Two Slaps. (Vancouver: Arsenal Pulp Press, 2003). Translated by Lenny Hu, with the collaboration of R. W. L. Guisso. ISBN 1-55152-134-2. Google Books
- The Lecherous Academician & Other Tales by Master Ling Mengchu. (London: Deutsch,1973). ISBN 0-85391-186-X. ISBN 978-0-85391-186-9.

== List of stories ==
Translated titles in this table follow those by Shuhui Yang and Yunqin Yang in Slapping the Table in Amazement: A Ming Dynasty Story Collection. University of Washington Press. 2018. ISBN 9780295742137. Titles used by other translators are listed as bullet points.

Below only lists the 40 stories from Slapping the Table in Amazement I.

#	Title(s) of English Translation(s)	Chinese Title	Notes
1	"The Man Whose Luck Has Turned Chances upon Dongting Tangerines; The Merchant from Persia Reveals the Secrets of a Turtle Shell"	轉運漢遇巧洞庭紅 波斯胡指破鼉龍殼	
2	"Yao Dizhu Flees from Disgrace Only to Incur More Disgrace; Zhang Yue'e Uses a Mistake to Advance Her Own Interests"	姚滴珠避羞惹羞 鄭月娥將錯就錯	
3	"Liu Dongshan Brags about His Prowess at the City Gate; Eighteenth Brother Leaves His Mark in the Village Tavern"	劉東山誇技順城門 十八兄奇蹤村酒肆	
4	"Cheng Yuanyu Pays for a Meal at a Restaurant; Lady Eleventh Explains Swordsmanship on Mount Cloud"	程元玉店肆代償錢 十一娘雲岡縱譚俠	
5	"Zhang Derong Encounters a Tiger Sent by the Gods as a Matchmaker; Pei Yueke Becomes the Lucky Mate Just in Time for the Blissful Date"	感神媒張德容遇虎 湊吉日裴越客乘龍	
6	"Zhao the Nun Drugs a Beauty into a Stupor; Jia the Scholar Takes Revenge in a Brilliant Move"	酒下酒趙尼媼迷花 機中機賈秀才報怨	
7	"Emperor Minghuang of Tang, a Daoist Devotee, Seeks Out Eminent Daoists; Consort Wu, a Buddhist Disciple, Witnesses Contests of Magic Power"	唐明皇好道集奇人 武惠妃崇禪鬥異法	
8	"General Wu Repays the Debt of One Meal; Chen Dalang Reunites with Two Loved Ones"	烏將軍一飯必酬 陳大郎三人重會	
9	"In the Director's Garden, Young Ladies Enjoy a Swing-Set Party; At Pure and Peaceful Temple, Husband and Wife Laugh and Cry at Their Reunion"	宣徽院仕女秋千會 清安寺夫婦笑啼緣	
10	"Scholar Han Takes a Wife in a Wave of Panic; Prefect Wu Makes a Match for a Talented Scholar"	韓秀才乘亂聘嬌妻 吳太守憐才主姻簿	
11	"An Evil Boatman Commits Blackmail with a Dead Body; A Heartless Servant Wrongfully Presses Murder Charges"	惡船家計賺假屍銀 狠僕人誤投真命狀	
12	"Mr. Tao Takes In Strangers Seeking Shelter from the Rain; Jiang Zhenqing Gains a Wife with a Jest"	陶家翁大雨留賓 蔣震卿片言得婦	
13	"Mr. Zhao Spoils His Son and Dies as a Result; Magistrate Zhang Sentences an Unfilial Son to Death in an Ironclad Case"	趙六老舐犢喪殘生 張知縣誅梟成鐵案	
14	"To Steal Money, Yu Dajiao Does Violence to a Drunken Man; To Confront the Culprit in Court, Yang Hua Attaches Himself to a Woman's Body"	酒謀財于郊肆惡 鬼對案楊化借屍	
15	"Squire Wei, with His Merciless Heart, Plots to Seize Another Man's Property; Scholar Chen, with His Clever Plan, Wins Back His House"	衛朝奉狠心盤貴產 陳秀才巧計賺原房	
16	"Zhang Liu'er Lays One of His Many Traps; Lu Huiniang Severs a Bond of Marriage"	張溜兒熟布迷魂局 陸蕙娘立決到頭緣	
17	"Prayer Services Are Held at West Hill Temple for a Departed Soul; A Coffin Is Prepared in the Kaifeng Yamen for a Living Criminal"	西山觀設輦度亡魂 開封府備棺追活命	
18	"An Alchemist Turns Half a Grain of Millet into a Nine-Cycle Pill; A Rich Man Squanders Thousands of Taels of Silver to Win a Beauty's Smile"	丹客半黍九還 富翁千金一笑	
19	"Li Gongzuo Ingeniously Reads a Dream; Xie Xiao'e Cleverly Snares Pirates"	李公佐巧解夢中言 謝小娥智擒船上盜	
20	"Li Kerang Sends a Blank Letter; Liu Yuanpu Begets Two Precious Sons"	李克讓竟達空函 劉元普雙生貴子	
21	"Yuan's Face-Reading Skills Impress the High and Mighty; Zheng's Good Deed Wins Him a Hereditary Title"	袁尚寶相術動名卿 鄭舍人陰功叨世爵	
22	"With Money, a Commoner Gains an Official Post; Out of Luck, a Prefect Becomes a Boatman"	錢多處白丁橫帶 運退時刺史當艄	
23	"The Older Sister's Soul Leaves Her Body to Fulfill a Wish; The Younger Sister Recovers from Illness to Renew a Bond"	大姊魂遊完宿願 小妹病起續前緣	
24	"The Old Demon of Yanguan County Indulges in Debauchery; The Bodhisattva on Mount Huihai Puts the Evil Spirits to Death"	鹽官邑老魔魅色 會骸山大士誅邪	
25	"Revenue Manager Zhao Leaves Word for His Love a Thousand Li Away; Su Xiaojuan Achieves Happiness with a Single Poem"	趙司戶千里遺音 蘇小娟一詩正果	
26	"In a Competition for Sexual Favor, a Village Woman Is Murdered; In Claiming Celestial Authority, a Judge Solves a Case"	奪風情村婦捐軀 假天語幕僚斷獄	
27	"Gu Axiu Donates to a Nunnery with Joy; Cui Junchen Is Shown the Lotus Screen through a Clever Scheme"	顧阿秀喜捨檀那物 崔俊臣巧會芙蓉屏	
28	"The Master of Golden Light Cave Recalls the Past; The Venerable Elder of Jade Void Cave Is Enlightened about His Previous Life"	金光洞主談舊蹟 玉虛尊者悟前身	
29	"They Remain Loyal to Each Other through Their Trysts; His Success Is Announced at the Jailhouse"	通閨闥堅心燈火 鬧囹圄捷報旗鈴	
30	"Commissioner Wang Rides Roughshod Over His Subordinates; Adjutant Li Gets His Comeuppance from a Reincarnated Victim"	王大使威行部下 李參軍冤報生前	
31	"Priest He Commits Fornication via Black Magic; Registrar Zhou Wipes Out Rebels via Fornication"	何道士因術成奸 周經歷因奸破賊	
32	"Mr. Hu Corrupts a Fellow Man in a Wife-Swapping Scheme; A Chan Master in Meditation Explains the Principle of Retribution"	喬兌換胡子宣淫 顯報施臥師入定	
33	"Squire Zhang, in His Noble-Mindedness, Adopts an Orphan; Judge Bao, in His Wisdom, Recovers a Document"	張員外義撫螟蛉子 包龍圖智賺合同文	
34	"Scholar Wenren Shows His Prowess at Cuifu Nunnery; The Nun Jingguan Goes in Glory to Huangsha Lane"	聞人生野戰翠浮庵 靜觀尼晝錦黃沙衖	
35	"A Pauper Keeps Temporary Watch over Another Man's Money; A Miser Resorts to Tricks When Buying His Nemesis's Son"	訴窮漢暫掌別人錢 看財奴刁買冤家主	
36	"The Monk of the Eastern Hall Invites Demonic Spirits during a Lapse in Vigilance; The Man in Black Commits Murder in an Abduction Attempt"	東廊僧怠招魔 黑衣盜奸生殺	
37	"Qutu Zhongren Cruelly Kills Other Creatures; The Yunzhou Prefect Helps His Nephew in the Netherworld"	屈突仲任酷殺眾生 鄆州司馬冥全內侄	
38	"To Stake His Claim on the Family Fortune, a Jealous Son-in-Law Plots against the Rightful Heir; To Continue the Bloodline, a Filial Daughter Hides Her Brother"	占家財狠婿妒侄 延親脈孝女藏兒	
39	"Heavenly Preceptors, with Their Theatrics, Claim to Subdue Drought Demons; A County Magistrate, in His Sincerity, Prays for Sweet Rain from Heaven"	喬勢天師禳旱魃 秉誠縣令召甘霖	
40	"On the Huayin Trail, Li Meets One Extraordinary Man; The Jiangling Commander Opens Three Mysterious Envelopes"	華陰道獨逢異客 江陵郡三拆仙書	
