= Shan'ge, the "Mountain Songs" =

2011 nonfiction book by Ōki Yasushi and Paolo Santangelo

First edition

Shan'ge, the "Mountain Songs" is a non-fiction book by Ōki Yasushi and Paolo Santangelo, published in 2011 by BRILL, discussing shan'ge by Feng Menglong. It is a part of the "Emotions and States of Mind in East Asia" series.

== Background ==
Ōki is a professor of Chinese literature at the University of Tokyo. He had researched Shan'ge for more than twenty years. Anne McLaren of the University of Melbourne wrote that the co-author is "well known for his works on Ming publishing and the life of Feng Menglong".

Santangelo is a professor of East Asian History at Sapienza University of Rome. Santangelo's focus was on pre-1912 China and how its people expressed their feelings.

The volume's series as a whole is aiming to illustrate life in the Ming Dynasty and Qing Dynasty.

== Content ==
The volume, with a total of 600 pages, starts with an introduction by Ōki. Katherine Lowry of the Hong Kong Polytechnic University described the introduction as "a condensed, masterful version of the historical research for his Japanese translation of the Shan’ge". Ōki focuses on the connection between the songs and how they reflect ordinary people. McLaren argued that "Oki’s hypothesis here about the circulation of songs of this type at village level in the late imperial period is quite well-founded." Judith Zeitlin of the University of Chicago wrote that the introduction "is too schematic adequately [sic] to represent his research" and "is riddled with English errors and mistranslations."

The first portion is a translation from Chinese to English, done by Ōki, of Shan'ge, a collection of Feng Menglong's songs. The Chinese original text is alongside the English translation. The basis of this English translation is Ōki's previous Japanese translation. Tomoyuki Tanaka made a draft, and Mary Wardle did revisions. The volume uses research by Chen Liujing and Shi Rujie, who have significant knowledge of Wu Chinese. The section includes an introduction to the songs. A total of 340 songs are included, covering chapters one through seven of the collection. Both co-authors inserted their commentary, with several of Ōki's notes originating from the Japanese version. The final three chapters of Shan'ge are not included. Lowry wrote that Ōki's translation "captures the spice", meaning the erotic character of the songs. Zeitlin argued that the translations "convey the multiple meanings of the originals" and "the book succeeds quite admirably in providing accurate English translations". She stated the translations are not "idiomatic translations of any literary merit in English".

Santangelo wrote the glossary, which takes up 250 pages. Each entry has the hanzi with an English translation of the term and additional information and citations. Santangelo also has an introduction of his own, taking 35 pages, and he focuses on the connection between the songs and songs in houses of prostitution in Suzhou. Santangelo's commentary was originally in Italian and translated into English. The work lacks a separate list of abbreviations, and index, and a table of contents, something Zeitlin says was done due to the prominence of Santangelo's glossary; Zeitlin stated that therefore one must use a Chinese or Japanese translation of the shan'ge to find relevant content.

McLaren wrote that due to the nature of the book, it could be "can be considered as two books not one". 41 illustrations are present to show particular objects appearing in songs; they are in black and white. In regards to the co-authors' analyses McLaren wrote they provide "useful explanatory context". Zeitlin argued that some of the information on the context was "often superfluous".

The book is dedicated to Feng Menglong's songs.

== Reception ==
Hsu concluded that the book "is a tremendous contribution to" various area students and "global anthropological history." Hsu stated that the prose was "scholarly yet reader-friendly" and that there was "rigorous translation and analysis" from both co-authors. Hsu stated that there were Simplified characters and some typographical errors in the initial printing of the book.

McLaren wrote in regards to the understanding of Wu and "the scholarly depth of its annotations", "one can say that this work supersedes earlier translations." She praised the inclusion of the Chinese original text. She concluded that it is "a work of remarkable erudition."

Lowry concluded that the contents have "made significant strides toward helping scholars to gain new insights from the historical record."

Zeitlin argued the book is "something of a missed opportunity" due to the omission of portions of the collection and too much prominence of the glossary, as well as translation errors with Ōki's introduction. She recommends the translations of the songs and their notes but stated "other components are to be used with caution."
