= Zheng Prefecture =

Historical administrative division in Henan, China

- Simplified Chinese: 鄭州
- Hanyu Pinyin: Zhèng Zhōu
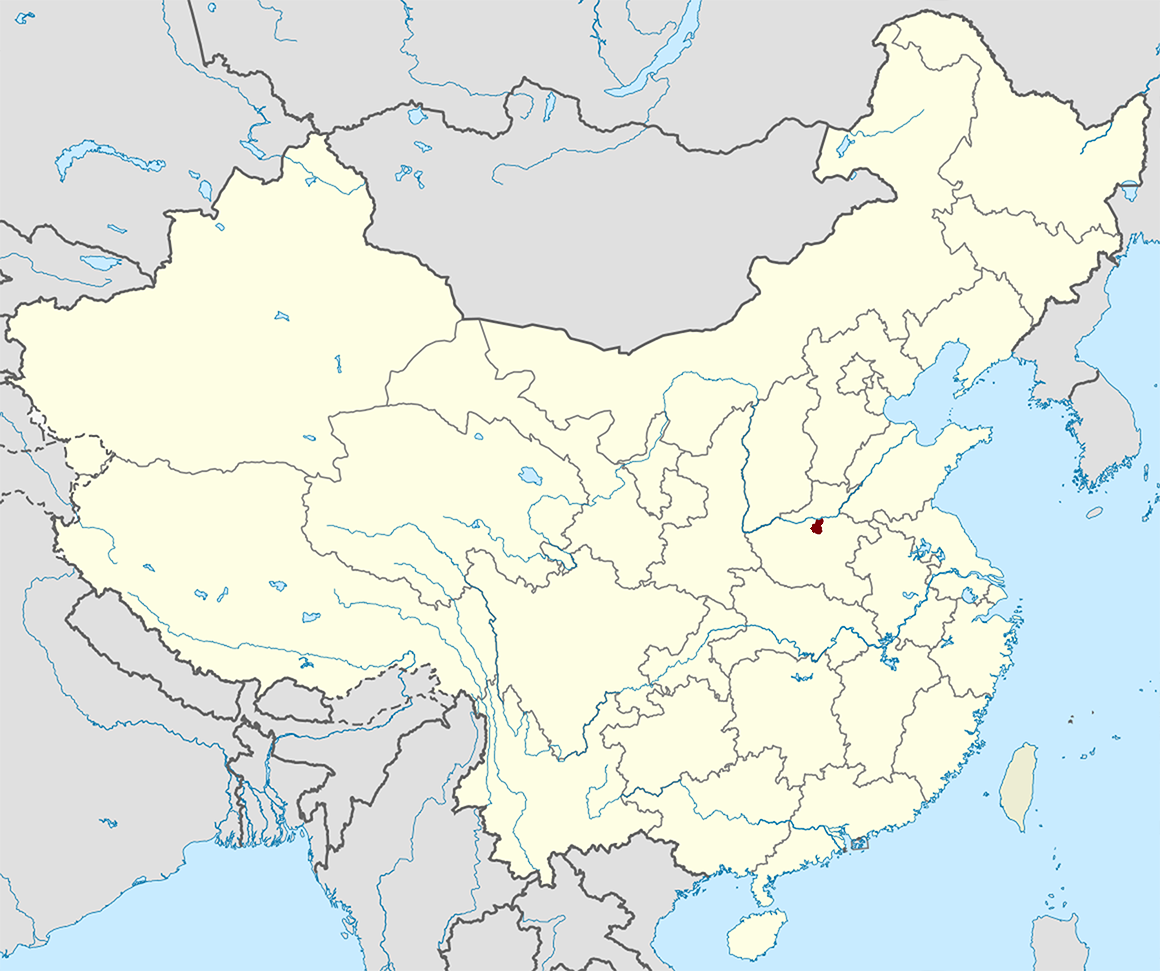
- Population
  - 740s or 750s: 367,881
  - 1100s: 41,848
- History
  - Preceded by: Xingyang Commandery
  - Created: 583 (Sui dynasty); 621 (Tang dynasty); 1085 (Song dynasty)
  - Abolished: 1913 (Republic of China)
  - Succeeded by: Zheng County
- Contained within
  - Circuit: Henan Circuit; Jingxi Circuit (960–1072); Jingxi North Circuit (after 1072)

Zhengzhou or Zheng Prefecture was a zhou (prefecture) in imperial China centering on modern Zhengzhou, Henan, China. It existed (intermittently) from 583 until 1913 after the foundation of the Republic.

The modern prefecture-level city of Zhengzhou, created only in 1948, retains its name.

== Counties ==
Zheng Prefecture administered the following counties (縣) for the most part of history:

#	Sui dynasty	Tang dynasty and after	Modern location
1	Guancheng (管城)		Zhengzhou
2	Xingze (滎澤)		Zhengzhou
3	Xinzheng (新鄭)		Xinzheng
4	Xingyang (滎陽)	Xingyang, mostly; Wutai (武泰), 691–696, 697–705	Xingyang
5	Yuanling (原陵)	Yuanwu (原武)	Yuanyang County, Henan

Two other counties, Yangwu (陽武) and Zhongmu (中牟) were part of Zheng Prefecture during the Tang dynasty, but after Later Liang (except briefly during Later Tang) they were administered by Kaifeng Prefecture.
