= Olivia Milburn =

British sinologist (born 1976)

Olivia Milburn (born 1976) is a sinologist, author and literary translator who specialises in Chinese cultural history and in Chinese minority groups.

== Life and career ==
Milburn is a professor at the School of Chinese, Hong Kong University.

Milburn grew up in a multilingual family living across eight different countries, and became interested in Chinese literature as a teenager, after reading a translation of the Dream of the Red Chamber. She completed a bachelor's degree at St Hilda's College, University of Oxford in 1998, a master's at Downing College, University of Cambridge in 1999, and a doctorate in classical Chinese at the School of Oriental and African Studies, University of London in 2003. After working as a lecturer at the University of London, she joined Seoul National University in 2008 and was appointed as a professor there in 2017. She started her current role at Hong Kong University in April 2022.

== Contributions ==
Milburn has authored several books including Cherishing Antiquity: The Cultural Construction of an Ancient Chinese Kingdom, Urbanization in Early and Medieval China: Gazetteers for the City of Suzhou, and The Spring and Autumn Annals of Master Yan.

She is also a literary Chinese-to-English translator. Her translations include the bestselling novel Decoded by Mai Jia (co-translated by Christopher Payne), which caught her attention because of a family connection: her grandfather was a codebreaker in World War II, like the book's protagonist. Her translation has been praised for its "tightly wrought aphorisms" and for "the classic beauty and elegant taste of the language".

In 2018, Milburn's translation work was recognised by the Chinese government and she was awarded Special Book Award of China, which honours contributions to bridging cultures and fostering understanding.

=== Selected works ===
- The Glory of Yue: An Annotated Translation of the Yuejue shu. Leiden: EJ Brill, 2010. ISBN 9789047443995.
- Cherishing Antiquity: The Cultural Construction of an Ancient Chinese Kingdom. Cambridge, Mass.: Harvard University Asia Center, 2013. ISBN 9780674726680.
- Urbanization in Early and Medieval China: Gazetteers for the City of Suzhou. Seattle: University of Washington Press, 2015. ISBN 9780295994604.
- The Spring and Autumn Annals of Master Yan. Leiden: EJ Brill, 2016. ISBN 9789004309661.
- The Empress in the Pepper Chamber: Zhao Feiyan in History and Fiction. Seattle: University of Washington Press, 2021. ISBN 978-0295748757.
- Feng Menglong, Kingdoms in Peril: A Novel of the Ancient Chinese World at War. Oakland, California: University of California Press, 2022. ISBN 9780520380516.
- Feng Menglong, Kingdoms in Peril: Volume 1, The Curse of the Bao Lords. Oakland, California: University of California Press, 2023. ISBN 9780520381001
- Feng Menglong, Kingdoms in Peril: Volume 2, The Exile Returns. Oakland, California: University of California Press, 2023. ISBN 9780520381032.
- Feng Menglong, Kingdoms in Peril: Volume 3, The Death of a Southern Hero. Oakland, California: University of California Press, 2023. ISBN 9780520381070.
- Feng Menglong, Kingdoms in Peril: Volume 4, The Assassins Strike. Oakland, California: University of California Press, 2023. ISBN 9780520381100.
- The Spring and Autumn Annals of Wu and Yue: A Literary Translation of the First Chinese Novel Wu Yue chunqiu. New York: State University of New York Press, 2024. ISBN 9781438499352.
- Khitan and Mongol Imperial Women in the Chinese Imagination: Ming Fantasies about Conquest Dynasty Harems. Liverpool: Liverpool University Press, 2025. ISBN 9781802075946.

=== Selected translations ===
- (With Christopher Payne) Mai Jia, Decoded. London: Allan Lane, 2014; and New York: Farrar, Straus and Giroux, 2014. ISBN 9781250062352.
- (With Christopher Payne) Mai Jia, In the Dark. London: Penguin, 2015. ISBN 9780141391458.
- (With Christopher Payne) Jiang Zilong, Empires of Dust. London: ACA Publishing, 2019. ISBN 9781910760338.
- Mai Jia, The Message. London: Head of Zeus, 2020. ISBN 978-1789543018.
- Feng Jicai, Faces in the Crowd: 36 Extraordinary Tales of Tianjin. London: Sinoist Books, 2020. ISBN 978-1910760482.
- Feng Jicai, A Looking-Glass World. London: Sinoist Books, 2021. ISBN 978-1838905149
- Fang Fang, The Walls of Wuchang. London: Sinoist Books 2022. ISBN 9781838905118
- (With James Trapp and Christopher Payne) Jia Pingwa, Old Kiln. London: ACA Publishing, 2025. ISBN 9781838905262.
