= Stories to Awaken the World =

1627 book by Feng Menglong

Xing Shi Heng Yan (醒世恆言, Stories to Awaken the World)
- Author: Feng Menglong (editor)
- Language: Written Chinese
- Genre: Short story anthology
- Publication date: 1627
- Publication place: Ming dynasty
- Preceded by: Stories to Caution the World

Stories to Awaken the World (醒世恆言; Xingshi Hengyan) is a Chinese story anthology compiled by Feng Menglong and published in 1627, composed of 40 vernacular stories. It follows Stories Old and New (1620) and Stories to Caution the World (1624).

== List of stories ==
Translated titles in this table mainly follow those by Shuhui Yang and Yunqin Yang in Stories to Awaken the World: A Ming Dynasty Collection, Volume 3. University of Washington Press. 2014. ISBN 9780295993713. Titles used by other translators are listed as bullet points.

#	Title(s) of English Translation(s)	Chinese Title	Notes
1	"Two High-Minded County Magistrates Vie to Take On an Orphan Girl as Daughter-in-Law": Dolby 1976: "Two Magistrates Vie to Marry an Orphaned Girl"	兩縣令競義婚孤女	
2	"Three Devoted Brothers Win Honor by Yielding Family Property to One Another": Wang 1944: "The Three Brothers"	三孝廉讓產立高名	
3	"The Oil-Peddler Wins the Queen of Flowers": Wang 1944: "The Oil Peddler and the Queen of Flowers"; Yang & Yang 1957: "The Oil Vendor and the Courtesan"; Lieu et al. 1978: "The Oil Peddler Courts the Courtesan"; Hanan 2006: "The Oil Seller"	賣油郎獨占花魁	
4	"The Old Gardener Meets Fair Maidens": Wang 1944: "The Flower Lover and the Fairies"; Yang & Yang 1957: "The Old Gardener"	灌園叟晚逢仙女	
5	"The Grateful Tiger Delivers the Bride at Big Tree Slope": Dolby 1976: "On Big Tree Slope a Faithful Tiger Acts Best Man"	大樹坡義虎送親	
6	"Divine Foxes Lose a Book at Small Water Bay": Yang & Yang 1957: "The Foxes' Revenge"	小水灣天狐貽書	
7	"Scholar Qian Is Blessed with a Wife through a Happy Mistake": Yang & Yang 1957: "Marriage by Proxy"; Dolby 1976: "The Perfect Lady by Mistake"	錢秀才錯占鳳凰儔	
8	"Prefect Qiao Rearranges Matches in an Arbitrary Decision": Hanan 2006: "Marriage Destinies Rearranged"	喬太守亂點鴛鴦譜	
9	"Chen Duoshou and His Wife Bound in Life and in Death": Acton & Lee 1941: "The Everlasting Couple"; Kelly 1978: "The Couple Bound in Life and Death"	陳多壽生死夫妻	
10	"The Liu Brothers in Brotherhood and in Marriage": Acton & Lee 1941: "Brother or Bride?"; Yang & Yang 1957: "The Two Brothers"	劉小官雌雄兄弟	
11	"Three Times Su Xiaomei Tests Her Groom"	蘇小妹三難新郎	
12	"Four Times Abbot Foyin Flirts with Qinniang"	佛印師四調琴娘	
13	"The Leather Boot as Evidence against the God Erlang's Impostor": Lieu 1978: "The Boot That Reveals the Culprit"	勘皮靴單證二郎神	
14	"The Fan Tower Restaurant as Witness to the Love of Zhou Shengxian": Hanan 2006: "Shengxian"	鬧樊樓多情周勝仙	
15	"In Eternal Regret, He Daqing Leaves Behind a Lovers' Silk Ribbon": Acton & Lee 1941: "The Mandarin-duck Girdle"	赫大卿遺恨鴛鴦縧	
16	"In Defiance, Lu Wuhan Refuses to Give Up the Colored Shoes": Hanan 2006: "The Rainbow Slippers"	陸五漢硬留合色鞋	
17	"Zhang Xiaoji Takes in His Brother-in-Law at Chenliu"	張孝基陳留認舅	
18	"Shi Fu Encounters a Friend at Tanque"	施潤澤灘闕遇友	
19	"Bai Yuniang Endures Hardships and Brings about Her Husband's Success"	白玉孃忍苦成夫	
20	"Zhang Tingxiu Escapes from Death and Saves His Father"	張廷秀逃生救父	
21	"With Her Wisdom Zhang Shu'er Helps Mr. Yang Escape"	張淑兒巧智脫楊生	
22	"With His Flying Sword Lu Dongbin Attempts to Kill the Yellow Dragon"	呂洞賓飛劍斬黃龍	
23	"Prince Hailing of Jin Dies from Indulgence in Lust": Sukhu 1986: "How Hailing of the Jurchens was Destroyed through Unbridled Lust"	金海陵縱欲亡身	Missing from one edition
24	"Emperor Yang of the Sui Dynasty Is Punished for His Life of Extravagance"	隋煬帝逸遊召譴	
25	"Mr. Dugu Has the Strangest Dreams on His Journey Home"	獨孤生歸途鬧夢	
26	"Magistrate Xue Proves His Divinity through a Fish"	薛錄事魚服證仙	
27	"Li Yuying Appeals for Justice from Jail"	李玉英獄中訟冤	
28	"Young Master Wu Goes to a Tryst in the Next Boat": de Fornaro 1929: "The Marriage of Ya-Nei"; Acton & Lee 1941: "Love in a Junk"; Hanan 2006: "Wu Yan"	吳衙內鄰舟赴約	
29	"With His Passion for Poetry and Wine, Scholar Lu Scorns Dukes and Earls": Yang & Yang 1957: "The Proud Scholar"	盧太學詩酒傲公侯	
30	"In a Humble Inn, Li Mian Meets a Knight-Errant": Jackson 1922: "Li, Duke of Ch'ien and the Poor Scholar Who Met a Chivalrous Man"	李汧公窮邸遇俠客	
31	"Regional Commander Zheng Renders Distinguished Service with His Divine-Arm Bow"	鄭節使立功神臂弓	
32	"Scholar Huang Is Blessed with Divine Aid through His Jade-Horse Pendant"	黃秀才徼靈玉馬墜	
33	"Over Fifteen Strings of Cash, a Jest Leads to Dire Disasters": Wang 1944: "The Judicial Murder of Tsui Ning"; Yang & Yang 1957: "Fifteen Strings of Cash"; Dolby 1976: "A Joke Over Fifteen Strings of Cash Brings Uncanny Disaster"; Kelly 1978: "The Jest That Leads to Disaster"	十五貫戲言成巧禍	
34	"For One Penny, a Small Grudge Ends in Stark Tragedies"	一文錢小隙造奇冤	
35	"In Righteous Wrath, Old Servant Xu Builds Up a Family Fortune": Zonana 1978: "Old Servant Hsü"	徐老僕義憤成家	
36	"Enduring Humiliation, Cai Ruihong Seeks Revenge"	蔡瑞虹忍辱報仇	
37	"Du Zichun Goes to Chang'an Three Times"	杜子春三入長安	
38	"Daoist Li Enters Cloud Gate Cave Alone"	李道人獨步雲門	
39	"Magistrate Wang Burns Down Precious Lotus Monastery": de Fornaro 1929: "The Monastery of the Most Excellent Lotus"	汪大尹火焚寶蓮寺	
40	"The God of Madang Conjures Wind to Blow Wang Bo to Prince Teng's Pavilion"	馬當神風送滕王閣	

== See also ==
- May you live in interesting times
