= R. W. L. Guisso =

Canadian historian and professor emeritus

Richard William Louis Guisso is a Canadian historian and professor emeritus at the University of Toronto. His research focuses on Chinese history, particularly the Tang dynasty, and the history of women in East Asia.

His publications include Wu Tse-t'ien and the Politics of Legitimation in T'ang China (1978) Women in China: Current Directions in Historical Scholarship (1981) and Shamanism: The Spirit World of Korea (1988). He served as President of the International T’ang Studies Society (1980–1985) and has been affiliated with journal Historical Reflections.

== Education and career ==
Guisso completed his doctoral studies at the University of Oxford, earning a D.Phil. in 1972. His dissertation, China’s Only Female Emperor and the Politics of Legitimation in T’ang China, examined the reign of Wu Zetian. He was supervised by historians R. S. Dawson and Denis C. Twitchett.

Guisso joined the University of Toronto in 1979 and became a full professor in 1985. He chaired the Department of East Asian Studies from 1980 to 1984 and again from 1998 to 2004, and served as associate chair and graduate coordinator from 1995 to 1998. He also held appointments in the University's Centre for Religious Studies and Centre for Medieval Studies. He is now professor emeritus.

== Research ==
Guisso’s research focuses on interdisciplinary topics within East Asian studies, with a primary focus on the political, cultural, and intellectual history of pre-modern China. His early scholarship focused on the study of imperial legitimacy, particularly through his influential analysis of Wu Zetian, the only female emperor in Chinese history.

Guisso's research on Chinese history included the roles and representation of women in early Chinese thought. He examined these subjects in his 1981 chapter “Thunder over the Lake: The Five Classics and the Perception of Woman in Early China.”

His work on korean studies include traditional religious practices and shamanism. He co-edited Canada and Korea: Perspectives 2000, published in 2002 with Young-sik Yoo, examining aspects of relations between the two countries.

Guisso is the author and editor of books including Wu Tse T’ien and the Politics of Legitimation in T’ang China (1978), a study of imperial ideology and gender; Women in China: Current Directions in Historical Scholarship (1981), Shamanism: The Spirit World of Korea (1988), The First Emperor of China (1989), which focuses on first emperor Qin Shi Huang; and Sages and Filial Sons: Mythology and Archeology in Ancient China (1991).
