= Jingxi Circuit =

- Chinese: 京西路
- Literal meaning: "West of the Capital" Circuit
Transcriptions
Standard Mandarin
- Hanyu Pinyin: Jīngxī Lù

Jingxi Circuit or Jingxi Province was one of the major circuits during the Song dynasty. In 1072 it was divided into 2 circuits: Jingxi North Circuit and Jingxi South Circuit.

Its administrative area corresponds to roughly the modern provinces of southern Henan, northern Anhui, northern Hubei and eastern Shaanxi.
