= Feng Menglong =

Chinese historian, novelist, and poet (1574–1646)

- Traditional Chinese: 馮夢龍
- Simplified Chinese: 冯梦龙
Transcriptions
Standard Mandarin
- Hanyu Pinyin: Féng Mènglóng
- Wade–Giles: Fêng^{2} Mêng^{4}-lung^{2}

Feng Menglong (1574–1646), courtesy names Youlong (猶龍), Gongyu (公魚), Ziyou (子猶), or Eryou (耳猶), was a Chinese historian, novelist, and poet of the late Ming Dynasty. He was born in Changzhou County, now part of Suzhou, in Jiangsu Province.

== Life ==
Feng was born into a scholar-bureaucrat gentry household, where he and his brothers Feng Menggui (馮夢桂) and Feng Mengxiong (馮夢熊) were educated in the classics and the traditional gentlemanly arts. He and his brothers, all well known as accomplished writers, artists, and poets, became known collectively as the "Three Fengs of the Wu Area" (吳下三馮). In spite of his literary talent and his zeal for scholarship from a young age, Feng sat the imperial civil service examinations many times without success, eventually giving up and making a living as a tutor and teacher.

In 1626, he narrowly avoided punishment after being implicated as an associate of Zhou Shunchang (周順昌), who was purged by the eunuch Wei Zhongxian. He resolved to complete his trilogy of vernacular Chinese short story collections: Stories Old and New, Stories to Caution the World, and Stories to Awaken the World (喻世明言, 警世通言, and 醒世恆言), the first two volumes of which had already appeared.

Feng Menglong was also known by a variety of pseudonyms or art names (號, hào), including 龍子猶, 墨憨齋主人, 吳下詞奴, 姑蘇詞奴, 前周柱史, 顧曲散人, and 綠天館主人. In recognition of his reputation as a writer, Feng was finally awarded the gongsheng degree in 1630 at the age of fifty-seven. In the subsequent year he received his first government post as instructor of Dantu County (丹徒縣, today Zhenjiang, Jiangsu). In 1634 he was appointed magistrate of Shouning County (壽寧) in Fujian. During his tenure, he was regarded as a morally upright and diligent administrator. He retired in 1638.

In 1644 the Ming state was thrown into turmoil by the sacking of Beijing by Li Zicheng's rebel army and invasion by the Qing forces. At the age of seventy-one, he published the Grand Proposals for National Rejuvenation (中興偉略) to inspire his countrymen to repel the invaders. He died in 1646 as the Ming dynasty continued to collapse. Some works indicate or imply that he was killed by Qing soldiers.

Feng's literary output consisted of the compilation of histories and local gazettes, the retelling of folktales and stories from antiquity in the form of short stories and plays, and the authorship of vernacular Chinese novels. Two of his noteworthy works are the Qing Shi (History of Love, 情史), an anthology of classical love stories, and the shenmo novel The Three Sui Quash the Demons' Revolt. In 1620 he published the Illustrious Words to Instruct the World (喻世明言), or Stories Old and New, the first part of his well-known trilogy. He was also put forward by multiple scholars as one of the contenders to be the writer of the supplemented story about Tian Hu and Wang Qing in Water Margin.

He is frequently associated with Ling Mengchu, author of Slapping the Table in Amazement, a two-part collection of entertaining vernacular tales.

== Writing style ==
Feng Menglong was in love with a famous prostitute when he was young. Unfortunately, Feng Menglong was not able to afford to redeem his lover out. At the end, his lover was redeemed by a merchant, and they had to leave each other. Feng Menglong suffered from pain and desperation due to the separation, and he expressed his sorrow through poems. This experience influenced the way he portrayed women in his stories. In fact, Feng Menglong was one of the few authors who portrayed women as being strong and intelligent; this was noticeably different from contemporary authors, who tended to ignore the importance of women's positions. The female characters in Feng Menglong's stories are portrayed as brave and bright when dealing with different situations. For instance, in his story "Wan Xiuniang Takes Revenge Through Toy Pavilions" from Jing Shi Tong Yan, the protagonist Wan Xiuniang shows her braveness during her tough times, being able to escape using her intelligence. Other female characters, such as Du Shi-niang and Qu Xiuxiu, are examples that show Feng Menglong's respectful and sympathetic portrayal of female characters.

Feng Menglong also expressed his attitudes towards society through his works, which were heavily influenced by his interactions with officialdom and the Chinese literati. Feng Menglong became the magistrate of Shouning near the end of his life, in his sixties. During his appointment, he sought to correct injustices and hoped to build up a reputation as a humble and upright official. Unfortunately, his efforts were frustrated by the widespread corruption of the late Ming dynasty (a theme also treated extensively in other contemporaneous works, such as Zhang Yingyu's The Book of Swindles (c. 1617)); bribery and extortion were common bureaucratic behaviors, and themes of official malfeasance figure in many of Feng's stories. Realizing that atmosphere of corruption could not be easily changed, Feng Menglong conveyed his discontent and patriotism through words. Each character of his stories has strong and direct characteristics: there is a clear morality line drawn between "good" and "bad". Moreover, the meaning behind the stories explores the social issues during Ming Dynasty. For instance, the stories of "The White Maiden Locked for Eternity in Leifeng Pagoda" and "The Young Lady Gives the Young Man a Gift of Money" from Stories to Caution the World express the idea of how women pursued their freedom and happiness under a patriarchal society.

During his tenure as magistrate of Shouning, Feng learned of the local practice of drowning female infants in the river. He authored the Public Notice on the Prohibition of the Drowning of Daughters (禁溺女告示) to appeal to parents not to carry out what he viewed as an abhorrent custom and provide for punishments for infanticidal parents and rewards for those taking in abandoned children.

== Works ==
- Stories to Awaken the World
- Stories to Caution the World
- Stories to Instruct the World, also known as Gujin Xiaoshuo ("Stories Old and New") (ca. 1620), also known as Yushi Mingyan (喻世明言) ("Illustrious Words to Instruct the World") selections translated by Cyril Birch, Stories from a Ming Collection: Translations of Chinese Short Stories Published in the Seventeenth Century (Bloomington: Indiana University Press, 1959; rpr New York: Grove).
- Pingyao Zhuan
- Qing Shi
- Taiping Guangji Chao (太平廣記鈔), an abridged version of the Song dynasty original consisting of some 2,500 stories in 80 volumes.
- Yang Shuihu, Yang Yunqin, tr., Stories Old and New: A Ming Dynasty Collection (Seattle: University of Washington Press, 2000).(A complete translation of Gujin Xiaoshuo).
- The Oil Vendor and the Courtesan Tales from the Ming Dynasty. (New York: Welcome Rain, 2007). Translated by T. Wang and C. Chen. ISBN
- Chronicles of the Eastern Zhou Kingdoms
  - with first ten chapters translated by Erik Honobe as The Rise of Lord Zhuang of Zheng (Hong Kong: Research Centre for Translation, 2021).
  - with 17 out of the original 108 chapters translated into English by Olivia Milburn as Kingdoms in Peril: A Novel of the Ancient Chinese World at War (Oakland, California: University of California Press, 2022).
  - in 2023, the full version was translated into English by Olivia Milburn in four volumes: The Curse of the Bao Lords, The Exile Returns, The Death of a Southern Hero, and The Assassins Strike (Oakland, California: University of California Press, 2023).
- Public Notice on the Prohibition of the Drowning of Daughters
- Shan'ge, a collection of songs. Katherine Lowry of the Hong Kong Polytechnic University stated that 1618 was the "most likely" approximate date. From circa 1634 to 1934 they were thought to have been lost, but they were rediscovered in Anhui province in a vendor's collection by a bookseller from Shanghai. Gu Jiegang edited a 1935 published version of the songs. Introductions to the pieces in the collection were written by Gu, Hu Shi, Qian Nanyang, Zheng Zhenduo, and Zhou Zuoren. The first translation into a non-Chinese language was the German translation by Cornelia Töpelmann. Liu Ruiming published versions of the songs with annotations in Modern Chinese. Ōki Yasushi translated the songs into Japanese for a collection published in 2003, then translated that into English, the latter included in Shan'ge, the "Mountain Songs".
  - Feng Menglong min'ge sanzhong zhujie (in Chinese). Beijing. 2005.
  - Ōki, Yasushi (2003). Fu Boryu 'sanka' no kenkyu: Chugoku Mindai no tsuzoku kayo 馮夢龍『山歌』の研究: 中国明代の通俗歌謡 (in Japanese). Tokyo: Keiso Shobo.
  - Shan ko. Von Feng Meng Lung. Eine Volksliedersammlung aus der Ming zeit (in German). Wiesbaden: Franz Steiner Verlag. 1973.

== In popular culture ==
Singer Yan Weiwen stars as Feng Menglong in the 2017 biographical film Feng Menglong's Legend (馮夢龍傳奇).
