= Li He =

Chinese writer

- 李賀
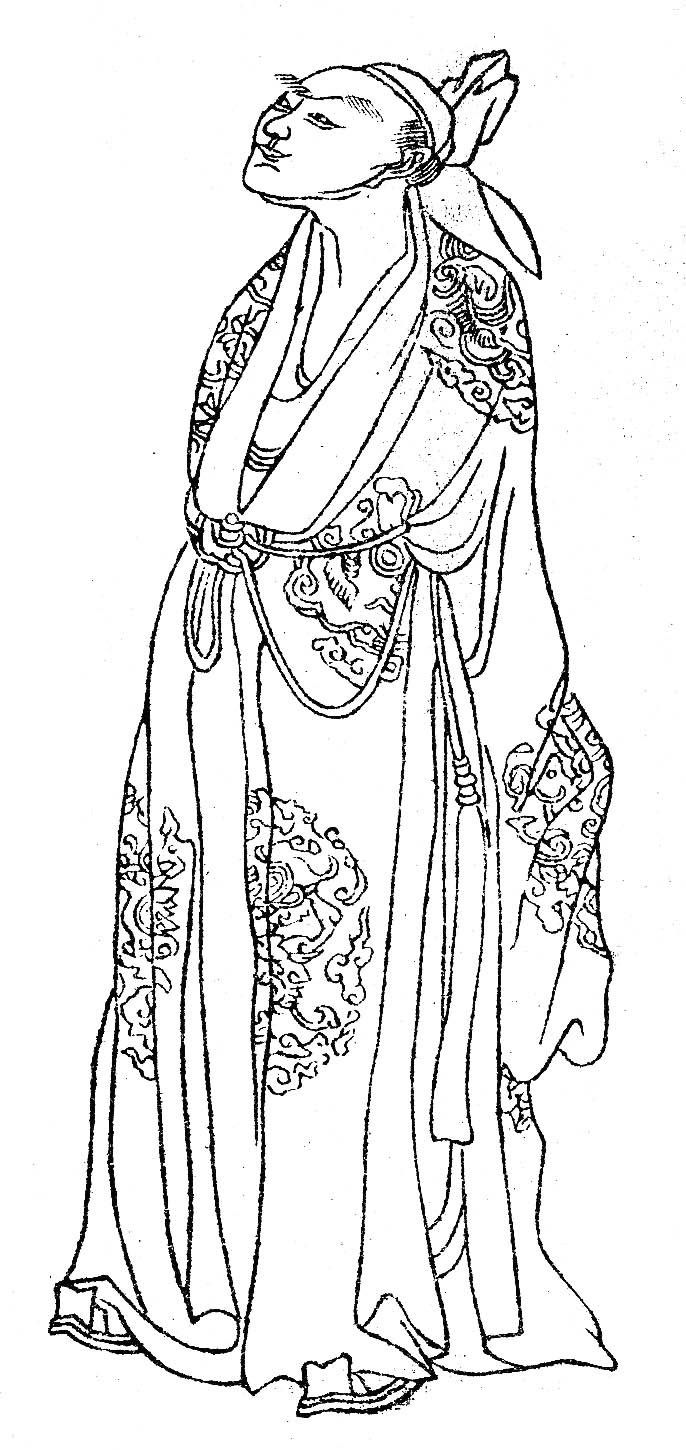
- Li He, as depicted in the 1743 book Wanxiaotang Zhuzhuang Huazhuan (晩笑堂竹荘畫傳).
- Born: 790/791; Luoyang, Henan, China
- Died: 816 (aged 25–26); 817 (aged 25–26); Yiyang County, Henan, China
- Occupation: Poet

Chinese name
- Traditional Chinese: 李賀
- Simplified Chinese: 李贺
- Hanyu Pinyin: Lǐ Hè
- Wade–Giles: Li^{3} Ho^{4}

Courtesy name: Changji
- Traditional Chinese: 長吉
- Simplified Chinese: 长吉
- Hanyu Pinyin: Chángjí

Nickname: Shigui
- Traditional Chinese: 詩鬼
- Simplified Chinese: 诗鬼
- Literal meaning: Poetry Devil
- Hanyu Pinyin: Shīguǐ

Nickname: Guicai
- Chinese: 鬼才
- Literal meaning: Devilish Talent
- Hanyu Pinyin: Guǐcái

Li He (李賀; c. 790–791 – c. 816–817) was a Chinese poet of the mid-Tang dynasty. His courtesy name was Changji, and he is also known as Guicai and Shigui.

He was prevented from taking the imperial examination due to a naming taboo. He died very young, and was noted for his sickly appearance.

He was a diligent poet, going out on journeys during the day and, when a line of poetry came to him, jotting it down, and completing the poems when he arrived home in the evening. His poems famously explored ghostly, supernatural and fantastic themes.

His popularity and place in the Chinese literary canon has fluctuated throughout the centuries. His idiosyncratic style of poetry was frequently imitated in China until the Qing dynasty. During this era, the popularity of his poetry suffered from a change in literary tastes, with his works notably being excluded from the influential Three Hundred Tang Poems, but there was a revival of interest in him in the twentieth century. He was among the Tang poets most admired by Mao Zedong.

== Sources ==
Chapter 137 of the Old Book of Tang (Note: 李賀，字長吉，宗室鄭王之後。父名晉肅，以是不應進士，韓愈為之作《諱辨》，賀竟不就試。手筆敏捷，尤長於歌篇。其文思體勢，如崇巖峭壁，萬仞崛起，當時文士從而效之，無能仿佛者。其樂府詞數十篇，至於雲韶樂工，無不諷誦。補太常寺協律郎，卒，時年二十四。) and chapter 203 of the New Book of Tang (Note: 李賀字長吉，系出鄭王後。七歲能辭章，韓愈、皇甫湜始聞未信，過其家，使賀賦詩，援筆輒就如素構，自目曰高軒過，二人大驚，自是有名。為人纖瘦，通眉，長指爪，能疾書。每旦日出，騎弱馬，從小奚奴，背古錦囊，遇所得，書投囊中。未始先立題然後為詩，如它人牽合程課者。及暮歸，足成之。非大醉、弔喪日率如此。過亦不甚省。母使婢探囊中，見所書多，即怒曰：「是兒要嘔出心乃已耳。」以父名晉肅，不肯舉進士，愈為作諱辨，然卒亦不就舉。辭尚奇詭，所得皆驚邁，絕去翰墨畦逕，當時無能效者。樂府數十篇，雲韶諸工皆合之絃管。為協律郎，卒，年二十七。與游者權璩、楊敬之、王恭元，每譔著，時為所取去。賀亦早世，故其詩歌世傳者鮮焉。) each give a brief outline of the biography of Li He.

Li Shangyin, a poet of the following generation, also wrote a Short Biography of Li He. Du Mu, in 831, wrote a preface to Li's collected poems (Chinese: 李賀集敘; pinyin: Li He ji xu), which is more removed than the affectionate account written by Li Shangyin, but provides very little biographical information and is more focused on Li's appeal as a poet. Both the official histories are heavily dependent on these earlier records, particularly on Li Shangyin's account.

== Names ==
His courtesy name was Changji, and he is also known by a combination of his surname and courtesy name, Li Changji.

He was also known as Guicai (鬼才, "devilish talent") by contrast of his morbid poetic style (Note: Huntington (2001, paragraph 46) attributes the reason for the moniker, which she translates "spectral talent", to "his poems of disjointed and fantastic worlds".) to Li Bai's Tiancai (天才 "heavenly talent") and Bai Juyi's Rencai (人才 "humanistic talent"). This title was given him by the Song scholar Qian Yi in his work Nanbu Xinshu.

He was also called 詩鬼 meaning "Poet Ghost" or "Poetry Devil", while Li Bai was called the "Poetry Immortal" (詩仙) and Du Fu the "Poetry Sage" (詩聖).

== Biography ==
=== Background and early life ===
His family were of distant royal descent (from the Li family who were the ruling dynastic family of the Tang dynasty), but his branch's fortunes had declined early on, and by Li He's time they were of low rank. Both the Tang state histories refer to him as a "descendant of Zheng Wang (鄭王)", but there is dispute as to the identity of Zheng Wang. The theory with more support among scholars is that it refers to Zheng Xiao Wang Liang (zh), an uncle of Li Yuan, the first Tang emperor; another theory is that it refers to the thirteenth son of Li Yuan, Zheng Wang Yuan Yi (zh).

He was born in 790 or 791. (Note: Ueki et al. (1999, p. 110) give "790?", Huntington (2001, paragraph 46), Noguchi (1994) and Digital Daijisen give 790, while Arai (1959, p. 5), Fukazawa (2013, p. 1219), Gotō (2002, p. 71), Kai and Higashi (2010, p. 833), Britannica Kokusai Dai-Hyakkajiten, World Encyclopedia and Daijirin give 791.) It seems likely that he was born in the year of the Horse, as some twenty-three of his surviving poems use the horse as a symbol for the poet. A native of Fuchang County (west of modern-day Yiyang County, Henan Province), (Note: Noguchi (1994) and Britannica Kokusai Dai-Hyakkajiten give his hometown as Changgu (昌谷).) he started composing poetry at the age of seven, and by around 15 he was being compared to the yuefu master Li Yi.

=== Political career ===
When Li was 20, he attempted to take the Imperial Examination, but was forbidden from doing so because of a naming taboo: the first character (晉, jin) of his father's given name (晉肅, Jinsu) was homophonous with the first character (進) of Jinshi (進士), the name of the degree that would have been conferred on him had he passed. Ueki et al. (1999) speculate that this was a pretext devised by rivals, who were jealous of his poetic skill, to prevent him from sitting the examination.

Han Yu, who admired his poetry, wrote Hui Bian (諱弁) to encourage him to take the exam, but Li was ultimately unsuccessful. He served only three years, in the low-ranking office of Fenglilang (奉禮郎) before returning to his hometown.

=== Sickness and death ===
He is described as having a very sickly appearance: he was supposedly very thin, had a unibrow, and let his fingernails grow long. Li He died a low-ranking and poor official in 816 or 817, (Note: Ueki et al. (1999, p. 110) give "816?", Huntington (2001, paragraph 46), Noguchi (1994) and Digital Daijisen give 816, while Arai (1959, p. 5), Fukazawa (2013, p. 1219), Gotō (2002, p. 71), Kai and Higashi (2010, p. 833), Britannica Kokusai Dai-Hyakkajiten, World Encyclopedia and Daijirin give 817.) at the age of 26 or 27. (Note: Ueki et al. (1999, p. 111), Noguchi (1994) and World Encyclopedia give 27 as his age at time of death.) The Short Biography of Li He reports that at the hour of his death he was visited by a figure in scarlet who told him that Shangdi had summoned him to heaven to write poetry.

== Poetry ==
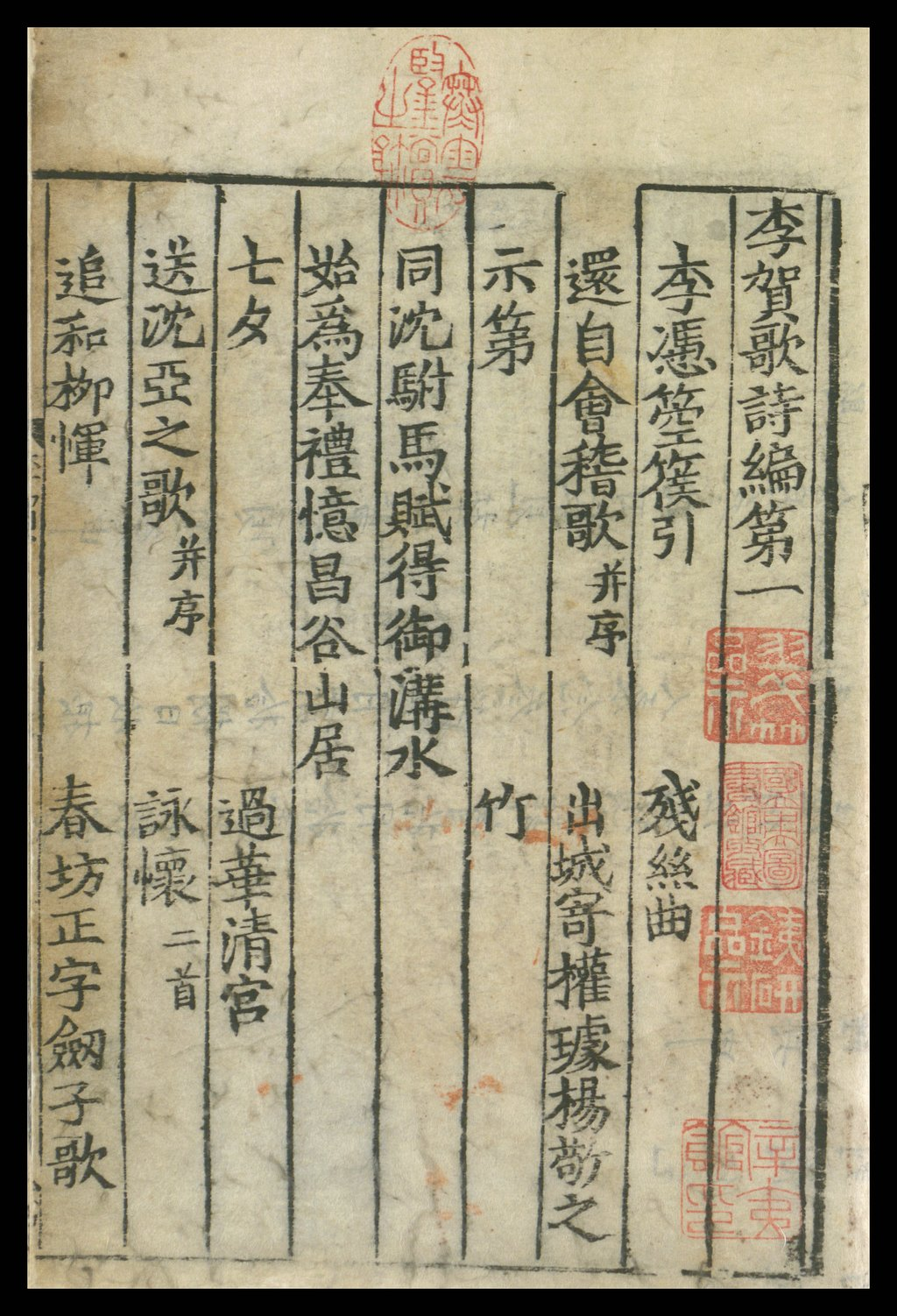
Collected Songs and Verses of Li He

In literary history, Li is generally considered a poet of the so-called Middle Tang period, which spanned the late-eighth and early-ninth centuries. Among his poetic influences were his older contemporary Meng Jiao and the aforementioned Han Yu. Other sources that have been identified as influencing Li's poetry were the shamanistic elements of the Chu Ci and the idiosyncratic poetry of Li Bai.

About 240 (Note: Fukazawa (2013, p. 1220) gives a figure of 244.) of his poems survive. The New Book of Tang reports that few of his poems survived because of their strangeness and because of Li's early death. An anecdote in the Taiping Guangji records that a cousin of Li's was asked to compile a collection of his poems, but because he did not like Li personally he eventually threw what had been collected in the privy.

There are two extant anthologies of his poems: the Collected Songs and Verses of Li He (simplified Chinese: 李贺歌诗篇; traditional Chinese: 李賀歌詩篇; pinyin: lǐ hè gē shī piān) and the Wai Ji (Chinese: 外集; pinyin: wài jí).

The Short Biography of Li He describes him as a diligent poet, who carried an old brocade bag around with him, and when a line of poetry came to him he would jot it down and put it in this bag. After getting home, he would arrange these lines into a poem.

His poetry is unique, filled with fantastic and unusual imagery, which is where he gets his nickname "Guicai" (see above). Virtually none of his surviving poems are in regulated verse form, and his poems make frequent use of inauspicious words such as "aging" (Chinese: 老; pinyin: lǎo) and "death" (Chinese: 死; pinyin: sǐ). In poems like "Tianshang yao" and "Meng tian", he wrote evocatively of the worlds of gods and Buddhas.

夢天 Traditional	Mèng Tiān Pinyin	"Sky Dream" English translation
老兔寒蟾泣天色， 雲樓半開壁斜白。 玉輪軋露濕團光， 鸞佩相逢桂香陌。 黃塵清水三山下， 更變千年如走馬。 遙望齊州九點煙， 一泓海水杯中瀉。	lǎo tù hán chán qì tiān sè, yún lóu bàn kāi bì xié bái. yù lún yà lù shī tuán guāng, luán pèi xiāng féng guì xiāng mò. huáng chén qīng shuǐ sān shān xià, gēng biàn qiān nián rú zǒu mǎ. yáo wàng qí zhōu jiǔ diǎn yān, yī hóng hǎi shuǐ bēi zhōng xiè.	A moon's old rabbit and cold toad weeping colors of sky, lucent walls slant across through half-open cloud towers. A jade-pure wheel squeezes dew into bulbs of wet light. Phoenix waist jewels meet on cinnamon-scented paths. Transformations of a thousand years gallop by like horses, yellow dust soon seawater below changeless island peaks, and all China seen so far off: it's just nine wisps of mist, and the ocean's vast clarity a mere cup of spilled water.

He also gave eerie descriptions of the world of ghosts in his poems "Qiu lai" and "Shen xian qu". The spiritual symbolism Li employed in the latter poem has been called "nearly impenetrable".

"Shen xian qu" was the name of a popular folk song going back at least as far as the Six Dynasties period, and Li's poem borrows the name of this song. The song originated in the Nanjing area, as a ritual song meant to be played at religious ceremonies to invite the favour of the gods. Li's poem describes the supernatural world but this is not the case with the original folk song.

He frequently combined colour and feeling imagery in his poetry, as can be seen in his poems "Tianshang yao" (see above) and "Qin wang yin jiu".

秦王飲酒 Traditional	Qín Wáng Yǐn Jiǔ Pinyin	"The King of Qin Drinks Wine" English translation (Note: This translation is based in part on a modern Japanese gloss of the poem, in Arai and Takahashi (1984, pp. 41–42).)
秦王騎虎遊八極， 劍光照空天自碧。 羲和敲日玻璃聲， 劫灰飛盡古今平。 龍頭瀉酒邀酒星， 金槽琵琶夜棖棖。 洞庭雨腳來吹笙， 酒酣喝月使倒行。 銀雲櫛櫛瑤殿明， 宮門掌事報一更。 花樓玉鳳聲嬌獰， 海綃紅文香淺清， 黃娥 (Note: The text is amended here, as Arai and Takahashi (1984, pp. 40-41) take 鵝 é as a scribal error.)跌舞千年觥。 仙人燭樹蠟煙輕， 青琴 (Note: The text is amended here in accordance with the Wenyuan Yinghua, following Arai and Takahashi (1984, p. 41); the Quan Tangshi has 清琴.)醉眼淚泓泓。	qín wáng qí hǔ yóu bā jí, jiàn guāng zhào kōng tiān zì bì. xī hé qiāo rì bō lí shēng, jié huī fēi jìn gǔ jīn píng. lóng tóu xiè jiǔ yāo jiǔ xīng, jīn cáo pí pá yè chéng chéng. dòng tíng yǔ jiǎo lái chuī shēng, jiǔ hān hē yuè shǐ dǎo xíng. yín yún zhì zhì yáo diàn míng, gōng mén zhǎng shì bào yī gēng. huā lóu yù fèng shēng jiāo níng, hǎi xiāo hóng wén xiāng qiǎn qīng, huáng é diē wǔ qiān nián gōng. xiān rén zhú shù là yān qīng, qīng qín zuì yǎn lèi hóng hóng.	The king of Qin tours the cosmos on tigerback, his sword's glimmer illuminating the clear, blue heavens. As Xihe whips the sun, glass is chiming; ashes of the old world, burnt asunder, flit about; peace reigns eternal. Drinking wine from a dragon-flask, he invites the god of wine to join him, his gold-set pipa twanging dyang-dyang in the night. The pitter-patter of the rain on Dongting Lake sounds like the blowing of a flute, deep in his wine, the King shouts at the moon, causing it to change direction. Silver clouds piled high, dawn comes to the bejeweled palace; the doorman announces the coming of night. In the flower palace, with its jade phoenixes, a woman's charming voice; a robe made of merfolk's thread and decorated with a crimson pattern, tinged with a faint scent, is worn by a yellow-robed serving girl who dances a dance of wishing for the king's reign to last a thousand years. The candles burn light smoke; the handmaiden's eyes well up with tears of purest water.

His poetic style was dubbed Changji-ti (simplified Chinese: 长吉体; traditional Chinese: 長吉體; pinyin: cháng jí tǐ) by later critics, after his courtesy name. The Song commentator Yan Yu listed this as one of the individual author-based styles of poetry that was frequently imitated.

== Reception ==
Several modern Western and Japanese critics, including A. C. Graham, Naotarō Kudō, and J.D. Frodsham, have claimed that Li's poetry was not widely read until the modern era, but this is not entirely accurate. In a 1994 survey, Wu Qiming pointed out that Li was in premodern China more subject to imitation than to neglect.

=== Tang and Song dynasties ===
Two poets of the generation following Li He, Du Mu and Li Shangyin, commemorated Li in their prose writings: a preface to Li's collected poems and a short biography of Li, respectively. Du Mu's preface in particular is taken as proof that Li's poetry was being compiled and edited within a few decades of his death, as internal textual evidence dates the preface to 831. The Tang author Pi Rixiu also wrote about Li He's poetry alongside that of Li Bai in his critical work "Liu Zao Qiang Bei" (traditional Chinese: 劉棗強碑; simplified Chinese: 刘枣强碑; pinyin: liú zǎo qiáng bēi).

He was also one of a group of Tang poets frequently quoted in the lyrics of Song-era musicians such as Zhou Bangyan (1056–1121). Yan Yu, in his work Canglang Shihua, contrasted Li to the earlier poet Li Bai. (Note: 人言太白仙才、長吉鬼才、不然。太白天仙之詞、長吉鬼仙之詞耳。) The earliest surviving edition of Li's poetry was collected and annotated in the Southern Song dynasty.

=== Yuan and Ming dynasties ===
Many shi poets of the Yuan dynasty emulated Li's poetic style. These included Cheng Tinggui (成廷珪), Yang Weizhen, and Gu Ying (顧瑛), as well as the early Ming poet Gao Qi.

The Ming scholar Hu Yinglin read Li's poetry politically as "the tones of a ruined state" and recognized that Li's poetic style was especially influential during the latter years of various dynasties.

=== Qing dynasty ===
There was an upswing in popularity of Li's poetry from the late Ming to the mid-Qing dynasties. A great many newly annotated collections of Li's poetry appeared during this period, and his poetry was widely imitated. The scholar Wang Qi wrote a five-volume commentary on his poetry.

Around the mid-Qing dynasty, though, Li's poetry began to fall out of favour with the literary establishment. The anthologist Shen Deqian included a scant ten of Li's poems in his influential work Tangshi Biecai Ji. Shen was highly critical of his contemporaries' tendency to imitate Li's poetry. Li's poetry was also conspicuously absent from the Three Hundred Tang Poems, the arbiter of poetic tastes in the late Qing and early twentieth century.

=== Modern era ===
Along with Li Bai and Li Shangyin, Li He was one of the "Three Lis" (三李) admired by Mao Zedong.

In his article on Li for the Chūgoku Bunkashi Daijiten, Japanese sinologist Kazuyuki Fukazawa called him "the representative poet of the Middle Tang". (Note: 中唐を代表する詩人 (chūtō o daihyō suru shijin).) According to French sinologist François Jullien, Li He's poetry was readmitted to the Chinese literary canon "at the end of the nineteenth century ... [when] ... Western notions of romanticism [allowed] the Chinese to reexamine this poet, allowing the symbolism of his poems to speak at last, freeing his imaginary world from the never-ending quest for insinuations." Paul W. Kroll, in his chapter on Tang poetry for The Columbia History of Chinese Literature, called Li "[t]he most eccentric poet of the T'ang, perhaps in all of Chinese poetry", and dubbed him "the Chinese Mallarmé" for his almost inscrutable poetic style and use of imagery.

== Works cited ==
- Arai, Ken (1959). Chūgoku Shijin Senshū 14: Ri Ga (in Japanese). Vol. 1. Tokyo: Iwanami Shoten.
- Arai, Ken; Takahashi, Kazumi (1984). Shinshū Chūgoku Shijin Senshū 5: Ri Ga, Ri Shōin (in Japanese). Vol. 1. Tokyo: Iwanami Shoten.
- "Li He (Ri Ga in Japanese)". Britannica Kokusai Dai-Hyakkajiten (in Japanese). Encyclopædia Britannica, Inc. 2014.
- Bryant, Daniel (2001). "Chapter 22: Poetry of the Eighteenth to Early Twentieth Centuries". In Mair, Victor H. (ed.). The Columbia History of Chinese Literature. New York: Columbia University Press. ISBN 0-231-10984-9.
- "Li He (Ri Ga in Japanese)". Daijirin (in Japanese). Sanseidō. 2006.
- "Li He (Ri Ga in Japanese)". Daijisen (in Japanese). Shogakukan. 1998.
- Endō, Seiki (15 April 2005). "Gafu Bungaku Shijō ni okeru Ri Ga no Ichi: "Fuzan Takashi" ni motozuku kōsatsu" (PDF). Tōkyō Daigaku Chūgokugo Chūgoku Bungaku Kenkyūshitsu Kiyō (in Japanese). 8 (1). University of Tokyo: 1–24. Archived from the original (PDF) on 2 February 2017.
- Frodsham, J. D. (1983). The Poems of Li He (790-816). Vol. 1. San Francisco: North Point Press. ISBN 0-86547-084-7.
- Fukazawa, Kazuyuki (2013). "Li He (Ri Ga in Japanese)". In Ozaki, Yūichirō; Chikusa, Masaaki; Togawa, Yoshio (eds.). Chūgoku Bunkashi Daijiten 中国文化史大事典 (in Japanese). Vol. 1. Tokyo: Taishūkan Shoten. pp. 1219–1220. ISBN 978-4469012842.
- Gotō, Yuri (2002). Ri Ga "Kisen" nitsuite no ichikōsatsu: Ri Haku "Tensen" to no hikaku kara (PDF) (thesis). Osaka University. pp. 71–85. Archived from the original (PDF) on 2017-02-02.
- Graham, A. C. (1971). "A New Translation of a Chinese Poet: Li Ho 李 賀". Bulletin of the School of Oriental and African Studies. 34 (3). University of London: 560–570. doi:10.1017/s0041977x0012854x. JSTOR 613902. S2CID 191327818.
- Graham, A. C. (1977). Penguin Classics: Poems of the Late Tang. Vol. 1. Penguin Group.
- Hinton, David (2014). Classical Chinese Poetry: An Anthology. Vol. 1. New York: Farrar, Straus and Giroux. ISBN 978-1-46687-322-3.
- Huntington, Rania (2001). "Chapter 6: The Supernatural". In Mair, Victor H. (ed.). The Columbia History of Chinese Literature. New York: Columbia University Press. ISBN 0-231-10984-9.
- Jullien, François (2004). Detour and Access: Strategies of Meaning in China and Greece. Vol. 1. ISBN 1-890951-11-0.
- Kai, Katsuji; Higashi, Hidetoshi (2010). ""Bantō Godai no Bungaku Hihyō, Shoron" Yakuchū (jō)". Fukuoka Daigaku Jinbun Ronsō (in Japanese). 42 (3). Fukuoka University: 821–842.
- Kroll, Paul W. (2001). "Chapter 14: Poetry of the T'ang Dynasty". In Mair, Victor H. (ed.). The Columbia History of Chinese Literature. New York: Columbia University Press. ISBN 0-231-10984-9.
- Lynn, Richard John (2001). "Chapter 18: Mongol-Yüan Classical Verse (Shih)". In Mair, Victor H. (ed.). The Columbia History of Chinese Literature. New York: Columbia University Press. ISBN 0-231-10984-9.
- Morise, Toshizō (1975). "Ri Ga (791–817): Shin Tō Sho kan 203". In Ogawa, Tamaki (ed.). Tōdai no Shijin: Sono Denki. Tokyo: Taishūkan Shoten. pp. 477–484.
- "Li He (Ri Ga in Japanese)". Mypaedia (in Japanese). Hitachi. 1996.
- Noguchi, Kazuo (1994). "Li He (Ri Ga in Japanese)". Encyclopedia Nipponica (in Japanese). Shogakukan.
- Sargent, Stuart (2001). "Chapter 15: Tz'u". In Mair, Victor H. (ed.). The Columbia History of Chinese Literature. New York: Columbia University Press. ISBN 0-231-10984-9.
- Sugitani, Shizuka (10 March 2014). Chūgoku Tōdai Bungaku Kenkyū: Kō Shō, Kō Kōken, Ryū Shin'un o chūshin ni (PDF) (Ph.D.). Kumamoto: Kumamoto University. Archived from the original (PDF) on 15 February 2017.
- Tung, Hung-ming (30 September 2014). Sakuhō-fukushi Jo Hokō: "Hōshi Ryūkyū-shi" no bunseki o chūshin ni (PDF) (Ph.D.). Nishihara: University of the Ryukyus. Archived from the original (PDF) on 4 February 2017.
- Ueki, Hisayuki; Uno, Naoto; Matsubara, Akira (1999). "Shijin to Shi no Shōgai (Ri Ga)". In Matsuura, Tomohisa (ed.). Kanshi no Jiten 漢詩の事典 (in Japanese). Vol. 1. Tokyo: Taishūkan Shoten. pp. 110–113. OCLC 41025662.
- Wada, Hidenobu (28 April 2001). "Ri Ga to iu shijin-zō: Ri Shōin "Ri Ga Shō Den" to Ri Ga no monogatari". Ochanomizu Joshi Daigaku Daigaku Chūgoku Bungaku Kaihō (in Japanese). 20 (1). Ochanomizu University: 50–68. Archived from the original on 2017-09-17.
- Wixted, John Timothy (2001). "Chapter 19: Poetry of the Fourteenth Century". In Mair, Victor H. (ed.). The Columbia History of Chinese Literature. New York: Columbia University Press. ISBN 0-231-10984-9.
- "Li He (Ri Ga in Japanese)". World Encyclopedia (in Japanese). Heibonsha. 1998.
- Wu, Fusheng (1998). "Chapter 3 (note 8)". The Poetics of Decadence: Chinese Poetry of the Southern Dynasties and Late Tang Periods. Vol. 1. Albany: SUNY Press. p. 228. ISBN 9780791437513.
- Xia, Gang (December 2001). "Nihon Reihō Nyūmon no chūkaku to chūkū: Nitchū no reihō, kannen no hikaku no ichidanmen (3)" (PDF). Ritsumeikan Kokusai Kenkyū (in Japanese). 14 (3). Ritsumeikan University: 71–87. Archived from the original (PDF) on 2017-02-02.
- Zeitlin, Judith T. (2007). "The Ghost's Voice". The Phantom Heroine: Ghosts and Gender in Seventheenth-century Chinese Literature. Vol. 1. Honolulu: University of Hawaii Press. ISBN 9780824830915.
