= History of literature =

The history of literature is the historical development of writings in prose or poetry that attempt to provide entertainment or education to the reader, as well as the development of the literary techniques used in the communication of these pieces. Not all writings constitute literature. Some recorded materials, such as compilations of data (e.g., a check register) are not considered literature, and this article relates only to the evolution of the works defined above.

== Ancient (Bronze Age–5th century) ==
Early literature is derived from stories told in hunter-gatherer bands through oral tradition, including myth and folklore. Storytelling emerged as the human mind evolved to apply causal reasoning and structure events into a narrative and language, allowing early humans to share information with one another. Early storytelling provided opportunity to learn about dangers and social norms while also entertaining listeners. Myth can be expanded to include all use of patterns and stories to make sense of the world, and it may be psychologically intrinsic to humans. Epic poetry is recognized as the pinnacle of ancient literature. These works are long narrative poems that recount the feats of mythic heroes, often said to take place in the nation's early history.

The history of writing began independently in different parts of the world, including in Mesopotamia about 3200 BCE, in Ancient China about 1250 BCE, and in Mesoamerica about 650 BCE. Literature was not initially incorporated in writing, as it was primarily used for simpler purposes, such as accounting. Some of the earliest surviving works of literature include The Maxims of Ptahhotep and the Story of Wenamun from Ancient Egypt, Instructions of Shuruppak and Poor Man of Nippur from Mesopotamia, and Classic of Poetry from Ancient China.

=== Mesopotamia ===
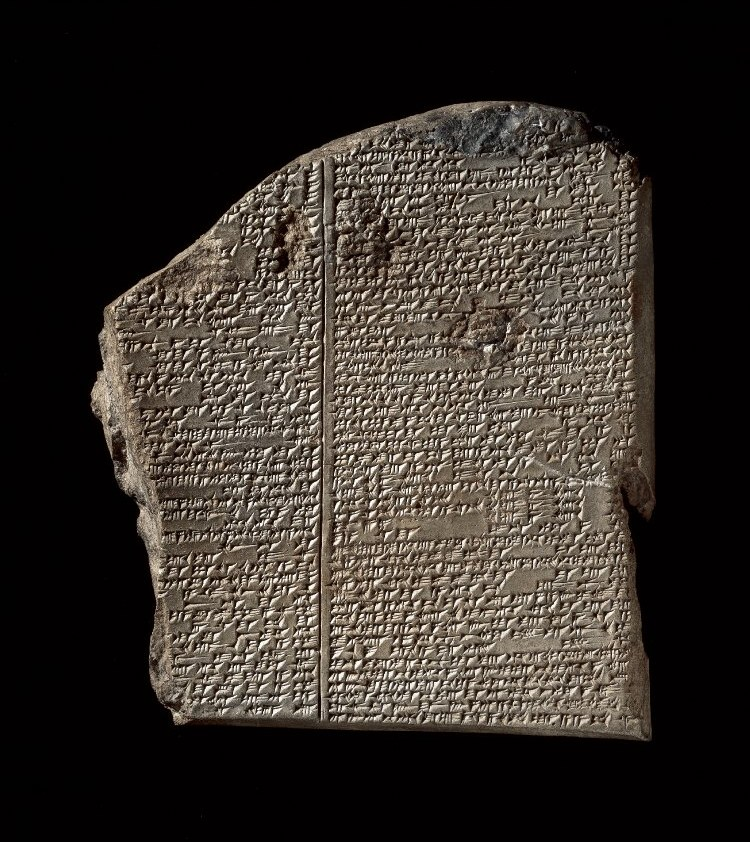
A stone tablet containing part of the Epic of Gilgamesh

Sumerian literature is the oldest known literature, written in Sumer. Types of literature were not clearly defined, and all Sumerian literature incorporated poetic aspects. Sumerian poems demonstrate basic elements of poetry, including lines, imagery, and metaphor. Humans, gods, talking animals, and inanimate objects were all incorporated as characters. Suspense and humor were both incorporated into Sumerian stories. These stories were primarily shared orally, though they were also recorded by scribes. Some works were associated with specific musical instruments or contexts and may have been performed in specific settings. Sumerian literature did not use titles, instead being referred to by the work's first line.

Akkadian literature developed in subsequent Mesopotamian societies, such as Babylonia and Assyria, from the third to first millennia BCE. During this time, it spread to other areas, including Egypt, Ugarit, and Hattusa. The Akkadian language was influenced by the Sumerian language, and many elements of Sumerian literature were adopted in Akkadian literature. Many works of Akkadian literature were commissioned by kings that had scribes and scholars in their service. Some of these works served to celebrate the king or the divine, while others recorded information for religious practices or medicine. Poetry, proverbs, folktales, love lyrics, and accounts of disputes were all incorporated into Akkadian literature.

=== Ancient Egypt ===
Literature of the Old Kingdom of Egypt developed directly from practical use during the Fifth Dynasty. Lists of offerings to the gods were rewritten as prayers, and statistical information about state officials was expanded into autobiographies. These autobiographies were written to exemplify the virtues of their subjects and often incorporated a free flow style that blended prose and poetry. Kings were not written about beyond clerical recordings, but poetry was performed during the funerals of kings as part of a religious ritual. The Instructions, a form of wisdom literature that was popular during most of Ancient Egyptian history, taught maxims of Ancient Egyptian philosophy that combined pragmatic thought and religious speculation.

These literary traditions continued to develop in the Middle Kingdom of Egypt as autobiographies became more intricate. The role of the king in literature expanded during this period; royal testaments were written from the perspective of the king to his successor, and celebrations of the king and advocacy of strong leadership were included in autobiographies and Instructions. Fiction and analysis of good and evil also developed during this period. During the New Kingdom of Egypt, the popularity of wisdom literature and educational works persisted, though the use of teachings and stories was prioritized over the use of discourses. Entertainment literature was popular among the nobility during this period, incorporating aspects of narrative myth and folklore, religious hymns, love songs, and praise for the king and the city.

=== Ancient China ===
==== Zhou dynasty ====
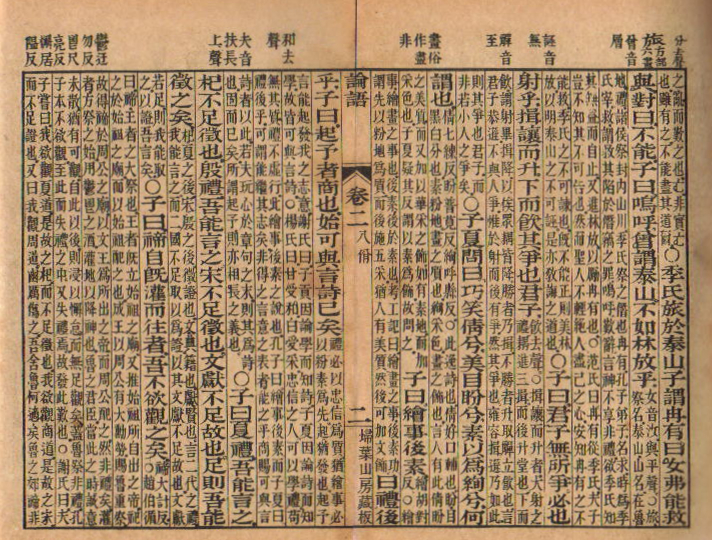
The Analects of Confucius

Chinese mythology played a notable role in the earliest Chinese literature, though it was less prominent compared to mythological literature in other civilizations. By the time of the Zhou dynasty, Chinese culture emphasized the community over the individual, discouraging mythological stories of great personages and characterization of the divine. Mythological literature was more common in the southern Chu nation. The Tao Te Ching and the Zhuangzi are philosophical compilations that serve as the foundation of Taoism. Confucius was a defining figure in ancient Chinese philosophy and politics. He collected the Six Classics as founding texts of Confucianism, and they became the central texts by which other works were compared in Chinese literary scholarship. Confucianism dominated literary tastes in Ancient China starting in the Warring States period. The sayings of Confucius were later compiled into the Analects by his students.

Anthologies were common in Ancient China, and anthologizing was used as a means of literary criticism to determine literary classics. The Classic of Poetry, one of the Six Classics, is the oldest existing anthology of Chinese poetry. It comprises 305 works by anonymous authors dating from the 12th to 7th centuries BCE. Prior to the collection of these works, poetic tradition in Ancient China was primarily oral. The Chu Ci anthology is a volume of poems from the Warring States period written in Chu and traditionally attributed to Song yu and Qu Yuan. These poems were written as rhapsodies that were meant to be recited with a specific tone rather than sung. The Music Bureau was developed during the Zhou dynasty, establishing a governmental role for the collection of musical works and folk songs that would persist throughout Chinese history.

Historical documents developed into an early form of literature during the Warring States period, as documentation was combined with narrative and sometimes with legendary accounts of history. Two of the Six Classics, the Book of Documents and the Spring and Autumn Annals, are historical documents. The latter inspired works of historical commentary that became a genre in their own right, including the Zuo Zhuan, the Gongyang Zhuan, and the Guliang Zhuan. The Zuo Zhuan is considered to be the first large scale narrative work in Chinese literature. The Art of War by Sun Tzu was an influential book on military strategy that is still referenced in the modern era.

==== Qin and Han dynasties ====
Poetry written in the brief period of the Qin dynasty has been entirely lost. Poetry in the Han dynasty diverged as several branches developed, including short length, paralleled exposition, rhymed exposition, and ancient style, and idealism also became popular during the Han dynasty. The Nineteen Old Poems were written at this time, though how they came about is the subject of debate. Poetry during this period abandoned tetrasyllabic verse in favor of pentasyllabic verse. The ballads of Chu spread through China and became widely popular, often focusing on concepts of inevitable destiny and fate.

Political and argumentative literature by government officials dominated Chinese prose during this period, though even these works often engaged in lyricism and metaphor. Jia Yi was an essayist known for his emotional political treatises such as The Faults of Qin. Chao Cuo was an essayist known for treatises that were meticulous rather than emotional. Confucianism continued to dictate philosophical works, though a movement of works criticizing contemporary application of Confucianism began with Wang Chong in his Lunheng. Prose literature meant for entertainment also developed during this period. Historical literature was revolutionized by the Records of the Grand Historian, the first general history of ancient times and the largest work of literature to that point in time.

==== Six Dynasties ====
Centralism declined during the Six Dynasties period, and Confucianism lost influence as a predominating ideology. This caused the rise of many local traditions of philosophical literature, including that of Taoist and Buddhist ideas. Prose fiction during the Wei and Jin dynasties consisted mainly of supernatural folklore, including those presented as historical. This tradition of supernatural fiction continued during the Northern and Southern dynasties with the Records of Light and Shade attributed to Liu Yiqing. Another genre of prose was collections of short biographical or anecdotal impressions, of which only A New Account of the Tales of the World survives.

Jian'an poetry developed from the literary tradition of Eastern Han, incorporating idiosyncrasies and strong demonstrations of emotion to express individualism. This movement was led by then-ruler of China Cao Cao. The poetry of Cao Cao consisted of ensemble songs published through the Music Bureau and performed with music. The Seven Sages of the Bamboo Grove were influential poets in the Wei dynasty mid-3rd century, addressing political and philosophical concerns directly in their poetry. Chinese poetry developed significantly during the Jin dynasty, incorporating parallelism, prosody, and emotional expression through scenery. Zhang Hua, Lu Ji, and Pan Yue are recognized as the great poets that developed early Western Jin poetry. Zuo Si and Liu Kun were poets in later Western Jin. In Eastern Jin, philosophical poetry went through a period of abstraction that removed much of its literary elements. Guo Pu and Tao Yuanming were notable poets in Eastern Jin.

The popularity of literary poetry and aestheticism grew during the Southern dynasties, and literature as art began to be recognized as distinct from political and philosophical literature. This resulted in the growth of literary criticism, with The Literary Mind and the Carving of Dragons and Ranking of Poetry being written at this time. The Sixteen Kingdoms of the Northern dynasties saw little cultural growth due to their instability, and Northern literature of this time was typically influenced by the Southern dynasties. Shanshui poetry also became prominent in Six Dynasties poetry.

=== Levant ===
Ancient literature of the Levant was written in the Northwest Semitic languages, a language group that contains the Aramaic language, as well as the Canaanite languages such as Phoenician and Hebrew. A corpus of Canaanite and Aramaic inscriptions (or "Northwest Semitic inscriptions") are the primary extra-Biblical source for the writings of the ancient Phoenicians, Hebrews and Arameans. These inscriptions occur on stone slabs, pottery ostraca, ornaments, and range from simple names to full texts.

The books that constitute the Hebrew Bible developed over roughly a millennium, with the oldest texts originating from about the eleventh or tenth centuries BCE. They are edited works, being collections of various sources intricately and carefully woven together. The Old Testament was compiled and edited by various authors over a period of centuries, with many scholars concluding that the Hebrew canon was solidified by about the 3rd century BCE. The New Testament was an additional collection of books that supplemented the Hebrew Bible, consisting of the gospels that described Jesus and the epistles written by notable figures of early Christianity.

=== Classical antiquity ===
==== Ancient Greece ====
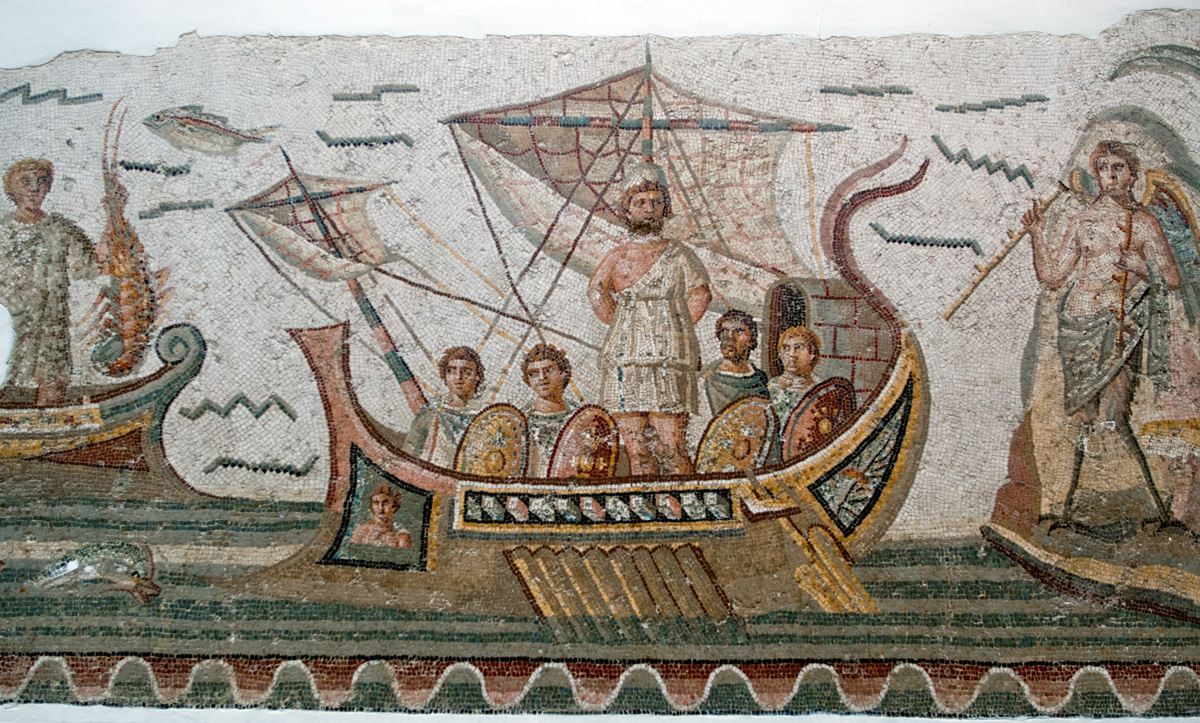
A scene from the Odyssey portrayed in an Ancient Roman mosaic

Early Greek literature was composed in dactylic hexameter. Homer is credited with the codification of epic poetry in Ancient Greece with the Iliad and the Odyssey. Hesiod is credited with developing a literary tradition of poetry derived from catalogues and genealogies, such as the Megala Erga and the Theogony. Notable writers of religious literature also held similar prominence at the time, but these works have since been lost. Notable among later Greek poets was Sappho, who contributed to the development of lyric poetry and was widely popular in antiquity.

Ancient Greek plays originate from the chorus plays of Athens in the 6th century BCE as a tradition to honor Dionysus, the god of theater and wine. Greek plays came to be associated with "elaborate costumes, complex choreography, scenic architecture, and the mask". They were often structured as a tetralogy in which three tragedies were followed by a satyr play. Aeschylus, Sophocles, and Euripides were known for their tragedies, while Aristophanes and Menander were known for their comedies. Sophocles is most well known for his play Oedipus Rex, which established an early example of literary irony.

Ancient Greek philosophy was developed as the foundation of Western philosophy. Thales of Miletus was the first person in recorded history to engage in Western philosophy. The Ancient Greek philosophical literature was advanced by Plato, who incorporated philosophical debates into dialogues with Socratic questioning. Aristotle, Plato's student, wrote dozens of works on many scientific disciplines. Aristotle also developed early literary criticism and literary theory in his Poetics.

==== Ancient Rome ====
In the Roman Republic, literature took the form of tragedy, comedy, epic, and historical. Livius Andronicus is recognized as the originator of literature in the Latin language, and due to Rome's influence, the development of Latin literature often extended beyond the traditional boundaries of Rome. Plautus was an influential playwright known for his comedies that emphasized humor and popular culture. The late republic saw the rise of Augustan literature and Classical Latin, which was primarily prose and included the works of Cicero and Sallust. Upon the formation of the Roman Empire, political commentary declined and prose went out of favor to be replaced by poetry. Poets such as Virgil, Horace, Propertius, and Ovid are recognized as bringing about the Golden Age of Latin literature. Virgil's epic poem the Aeneid closely followed the formula established by Homer.

Prominent Latin authors that lived during the early empire included Pliny the Elder, Seneca the Younger, and Emperor Marcus Aurelius. As the Roman Empire grew, Latin literature increasingly came from Spain and Northern Africa. Historical works of the early empire included the epic Pharsalia by Lucan, which followed Caesar's civil war, and the Annals of Tacitus, which recorded the events of the first century. The Golden Ass by Apuleius was written in the later Empire and is possibly the world's oldest novel. The adoption of Christianity in the Roman Empire became apparent in Latin literature, most notably in the confessional writing of Augustine of Hippo, such as the Confessions.

=== Ancient India ===
Knowledge traditions in India handed down philosophical gleanings and theological concepts through the two traditions of Shruti and Smriti, meaning that which is learnt and that which is experienced, which included the Vedas. It is generally believed that the Puranas are the earliest philosophical writings in Indian history, although linguistic works on Sanskrit existed earlier than 1000 BCE. Puranic works such as the Indian epics: Ramayana and Mahabharata, have influenced countless other works, including Balinese Kecak and other performances such as shadow puppetry (wayang), and many European works. Pali literature has an important position in the rise of Buddhism. Classical Sanskrit literature flowers in the Maurya and Gupta periods, roughly spanning the 2nd century BCE to the 8th century CE. Classical Tamil literature also emerged in the early historic period dating from 300 BCE to 300 CE, and is the earliest secular literature of India, mainly dealing with themes such as love and war. The Gupta period in India sees the flowering of Sanskrit drama, classical Sanskrit poetry and the compilation of the Puranas.

== Post-classical (5th century–15th century) ==
=== Medieval Europe ===
After the fall of Rome (in roughly 476), many of the literary approaches and styles invented by the Greeks and Romans fell out of favor in Europe. In the millennium or so that intervened between Rome's fall and the Florentine Renaissance, medieval literature focused more and more on faith and faith-related matters, in part because the works written by the Greeks had not been preserved in Europe, and therefore there were few models of classical literature to learn from and move beyond. Although much had been lost to the ravages of time (and to catastrophe, as in the burning of the Library of Alexandria), many Greek works remained extant: they were preserved and copied carefully by Muslim scribes. What little there was became changed and distorted, with new forms beginning to develop from the distortions. Some of these distorted beginnings of new styles can be seen in the literature generally described as Matter of Rome, Matter of France and Matter of Britain.

Around 400 CE, the Prudenti Psychomachia began the tradition of allegorical tales. Poetry flourished, however, in the hands of the troubadours, whose courtly romances and chanson de geste amused and entertained the upper classes who were their patrons. The First Crusade in 1095 also affected literature. For instance the image of the knight would take on a different significance. The Islamic emphasis on scientific investigation and the preservation of the Greek philosophical writings would also affect European literature.

Hagiographies, or "lives of the saints", were frequent among early medieval European texts. The writings of Bede—Historia ecclesiastica gentis Anglorum—and others continue the faith-based historical tradition begun by Eusebius in the early 4th century. Between Augustine and The Bible, religious authors had numerous aspects of Christianity that needed further explication and interpretation. Thomas Aquinas, more than any other single person, was able to turn theology into a kind of science, in part because he was heavily influenced by Aristotle, whose works were returning to Europe in the 13th century. Playwriting essentially ceased, except for the mystery plays and the passion plays that focused heavily on conveying Christian belief to the common people.

Latin continued to be used as a literary language in medieval Europe. Though it was also spoken, it was primarily learned and expressed through literature, and scientific literature was typically written in Latin. Christianity became increasingly prominent in medieval European literature, also written in Latin. Religious literature in other languages proliferated during the 13th century as those who were not educated in Latin sought religious literature that they could understand. Women in particular were not permitted to learn Latin, and an extensive body of religious literature in many languages was written by women at this time.

==== Medieval England ====
Early medieval literature in England was written in Old English, which is not mutually intelligible with modern English. Works of this time include the epic poem Beowulf and Arthurian fantasy based on the legendary character of King Arthur. Literature in the modern English language began with Geoffrey Chaucer in the 14th century, known for The Canterbury Tales.

==== Medieval Italy ====
The Divine Comedy by Dante Alighieri was completed circa 1321. Organized into three parts called cantiche, Divine Comedy is a narrative poem that is regarded as a preeminent work in Italian literature. It follows Dante's journey into three different realms of the dead, Inferno (Hell), Purgatorio (Purgatory), and Paradiso (Paradise), with the Roman poet Virgil and Beatrice, Dante's idealized woman, guiding him. Though Divine Comedy was largely ignored by the literary world during and a while after its publication, it gained further acclaim in the English-speaking world after British Romanticist poet William Blake and other 19th century Romanticist writers "rediscovered" the poem, influencing later writers such as T.S. Eliot and Ezra Pound. The narrative reflects the medieval philosophy of the afterlife as it existed in the 14th century Western Church as well as established the Tuscan language as the standard Italian language. The Decameron by Giovanni Boccaccio was published in 1351, and it influenced European literature over the following centuries. Its framing device of ten individuals each telling ten stories introduced the term novella and inspired later works, including Chaucer's Canterbury Tales.

=== Islamic world ===
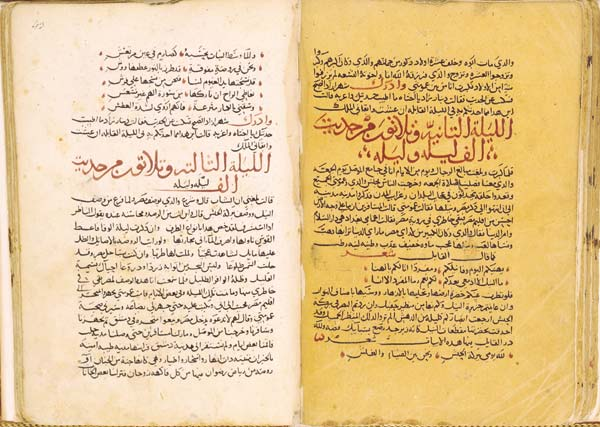
Arabic manuscript of the One Thousand and One Nights

The most well known fiction from the Islamic world was The Book of One Thousand and One Nights (Arabian Nights), which was a compilation of many earlier folk tales told by the Persian Queen Scheherazade. The epic took form in the 10th century and reached its final form by the 14th century; the number and type of tales have varied from one manuscript to another. This epic has been influential in the West since it was translated in the 18th century, first by Antoine Galland. Many imitations were written, especially in France.

==== Persian literature ====
Ferdowsi's Shahnameh, the national epic of Iran, is a mythical and heroic retelling of Persian history and the longest epic poem ever written. From Persian culture the book which would, eventually, become the most famous in the west is the Rubaiyat of Omar Khayyam. The Rubáiyát is a collection of poems by the Persian mathematician and astronomer Omar Khayyám (1048–1122). "Rubaiyat" means "quatrains": verses of four lines. Amir Arsalan was also a popular mythical Persian story.

Examples of early Persian proto-science fiction include Al-Farabi's Opinions of the residents of a splendid city about a utopian society, and elements such as the flying carpet.

=== Post-classical Hebrew literature ===
Medieval Jewish fiction often drew on ancient Jewish legends, and was written in a variety of languages including Hebrew and Judeo-Arabic. Liturgical Jewish poetry in Hebrew flourished in Palestine in the seventh and eighth centuries with the writings of Yose ben Yose, Yannai, and Eleazar Kalir Later Jewish poets in Spain, Provençal, and Italy wrote both religious and secular poems in Hebrew; particularly prominent poets were the Spanish Jewish poets Solomon ibn Gabirol and Yehuda Halevi. In addition to poetry and fiction, medieval Jewish literature also includes philosophical literature, mystical (Kabbalistic) literature, ethical (musar) literature, legal (halakhic) literature, and commentaries on the Bible.

=== Medieval India ===
Sanskrit declines in the early 2nd millennium, late works such as the Kathasaritsagara dating to the 11th century, to the benefit of literature composed in Middle Indic vernaculars such as Old Bengali, Old Hindi.

=== Mid-imperial China ===
==== Sui and Tang dynasties ====
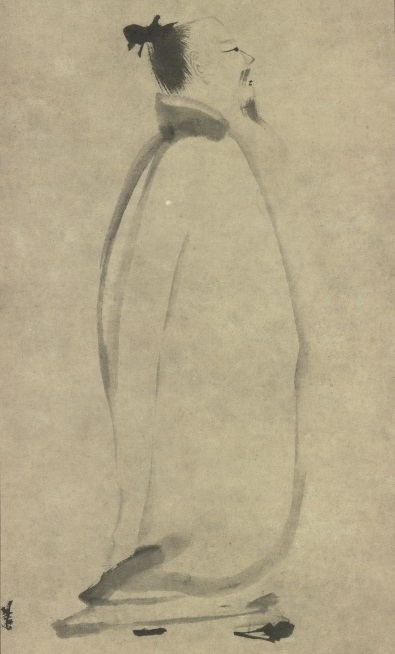
Li Po Chanting a Poem, by Liang K'ai (13th century)

Lu Sidao, Xue Daoheng, and Yang Su were notable poets of the early Sui dynasty, with Yang moving away from the dominant traditions of Southern poetry. In the Sui and early Tang dynasties, literature was supported by the various emperors, who commissioned many works and wrote some of their own. Poetry in this period followed the Palace Style until it diverged with the work of the Four Paragons. Wang Changling and Li Bai are recognized among the great poets of High Tang. Landscape poetry and frontier poetry were both influential during the Tang dynasty. Tang poetry also included cí, a type of lyric poetry. Chinese poetry increased focus on politics, human suffering, and realism in the mid-Tang dynasty, such as in the works of Du Fu. Chinese poetry diverged into two schools in the early-9th century; poets such as Meng Jiao and Han Yu wrote about the unusual, while poets such as Bai Juyi and Yuan Zhen emphasized simplicity. The final years of the Tang dynasty saw the rise of lyric poetry and erotic poetry. Li Shangyin and Wen Tingyun were influential poets during this period.

Fictional narrative became prominent in the Tang dynasty, written with looser restrictions on form and length. Fiction in the mid-Tang period focused primarily on social commentary and romantic love, and notable authors during this time included Shen Jiji and Yuan Zhen. Collections of stories became more common in the Late Tang period, particularly those of chivalrous tales by authors such as Pei Xing. Popular literature of the time included transformation text, vernacular story, sutra, song, and rhapsody. The style of prose was not initially developed during the Tang dynasty. Parallel prose remained popular in the early Tang dynasty, though writers such as Li Bai moved away from strict form that was common at the time. Han Yu promoted the use of classical prose in the style of ancient Confucisionist works. Printing began in Tang dynasty China. A copy of the Diamond Sutra, a key Buddhist text, found sealed in a cave in China in the early 20th century, is the oldest known dated printed book, with a printed date of 868. The method used was block printing.

==== Song and Jin dynasties ====
Printing first became widespread in the Northern Song. Northern Song lyric poetry was developed by Yan Shu, Liu Yong, and Zhang Xian, and it became a popular pastime among the lower class. Ouyang Xiu developed the popular style of lyric poetry while Yan Jidao developed the refined style. Lyric poetry contrasted with the more formal shi poetry that followed canonical literary forms and was used by scholars. Political pressures heavily influenced the poetry of scholars in the Northern Song, as proficiency in older styles was a requirement for scholars to enter into civil service. Politics and Confucianism in particular increasingly influenced poetry in Northern Song. Poets such as Mei Yaochen and Su Shunquin developed the style of poetry used in the Middle Northern Song. Ouyang Xiu was a prominent literary scholar in Northern Song that refined the mainstream literary style of the time, and Su Shi is said to have perfected it.

Chen Yuyi defined the style of Early Southern Song poetry. Lu You was a poet in the Middle Southern Song that wrote extensively about political life in civil service and frustration with the dynasty's weakened position in the Jin–Song Wars, while Xin Qiji was a Middle Southern Song poet that wrote on similar topics from a military perspective. Poetic style did not advance significantly in the Late Southern Song, though Yan Yu's Canglang Shihua was influential in poetic theory. Classical poetry in the Early Jin emphasized emotion, while elegance was emphasized later in the Jin dynasty.

Popular fiction was typically performed in the Song dynasty, made up primarily of small talk fiction and historical tales. Classical prose fiction in the Song dynasty often sacrificed linguistic quality and imagination for plain language and moral teaching. Zaju variety plays developed during the Song dynasty as a predecessor to drama. The scientist, statesman, and general Shen Kuo (1031–1095 CE) was the author of the Dream Pool Essays (1088), a large book of scientific literature that included the oldest description of the magnetized compass. During the Song dynasty, there was also the enormous historical work of the Zizhi Tongjian, compiled into 294 volumes of 3 million written Chinese characters by the year 1084 CE. The Jin dynasty saw advances in popular literature, including Romance of the Western Chamber.

==== Yuan dynasty ====
Drama was significantly developed as a literary form in the Yuan dynasty and made up much of the era's fictional works. Variety plays were influential in the Early Yuan period, with Khanbaliq, present-day Beijing, as the cultural center of variety plays. As the 14th century began, variety play writers moved to Hangzhou, though variety plays declined and they did not achieve the same prominence. The nanxi was developed as a genre of play at the same time, reflecting the unique political life of the Yuan dynasty in which civil service, infidelity, and inter-clan politics all played a major role. Tale of the Pipa by Gao Ming was an influential nanxi drama. Qu was a common type of poetry in the Yuan dynasty that was used both as a standalone work and part of the structure of a play.

Two of the earliest Chinese novels, Romance of the Three Kingdoms and Water Margin, first appeared in the Yuan dynasty. Poetry in the Yuan dynasty remained the primary form of expression for classical writers, though the Song tradition of intellectual poetry was replaced by poetry that expressed strong emotion. Northern Yuan poetry was influenced by the works of Yuan Haowen while Southern Yuan poetry was influenced by Yan Yu.

=== Classical and feudal Japan ===
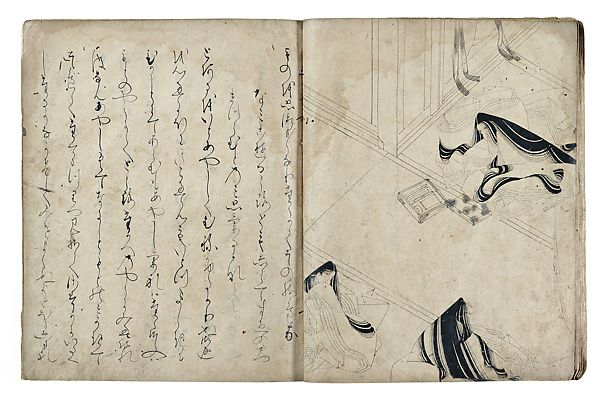
Illustrated 13th century copy of The Tale of Genji

Japanese literature first diverged from Chinese literature around the eighth century. Fudoki were eighth century records that were typically written in Chinese and documented both historical and mythological stories. Folk ballads were also common, including those recorded in the fudoki and musical ballads. These ballads were written to be chanted and often had a syllabic structure, with the tanka being highly regarded in particular. The writing of waka poetry became increasingly important in the Heian period as it became a necessary skill for the aristocracy in both social and courtship settings.

The Man'yōshū is the oldest collection of Japanese poetry, written in Japanese with Chinese characters through Man'yōgana and compiling waka poetry from the fifth to eighth centuries. The Kokin Wakashū was a collection of ninth century waka poetry compiled by imperial command. While the Man'yōshū was varied in the classes and professions of its writers, the poems of the Kokin Wakashū were limited to those of aristocratic poets. The Tales of Ise is a collection of loosely connected poems and narratives based on the life of Ariwara no Narihira.

Utsubo Monogatari and Ochikubo Monogatari were early prose works from the 10th century that realistically portrayed the lives of the aristocracy, and the former is sometimes considered to be the first full-length novel. At the same time, women of the aristocracy began keeping diaries that followed aristocratic life. The Tale of Genji was the next major prose work in Japan, written in the 11th century. Its use of realism and romantic idealization inspired later works of Heian period prose fiction, including historical works such as Eiga Monogatari and Ōkagami; romantic novels such as The Tale of Sagoromo, Yoru no Nezame, Hamamatsu Chūnagon Monogatari, and Torikaebaya Monogatari; and short story collections such as Tsutsumi Chūnagon Monogatari. While these stories typically portrayed the aristocracy, Konjaku Monogatarishū was written in the 12th century, compiling roughly one thousand stories from different walks of life in Japan, China, and India. Japanese literature expanded beyond the aristocracy in the 13th century and became increasingly accessible to lower classes, often through the narration of religious texts such as The Tale of the Heike by blind priests. In the 14th and 15th centuries, poetry such as renga and drama such as noh and kyōgen was written by professional writers under the patronage of the court, temples, or local lords.

=== Southeast Asia ===
The literary tradition of Java and the Kawi language is most well known for kakawin poetry. These were narrative poems based on the traditions of Sanskrit poetry, and they often incorporated religious elements. The oldest surviving kakawin is Kakawin Ramayana from the 9th century, a Javanese localization of the Sanskrit Bhaṭṭikāvya.

=== Pre-Columbian Mesoamerica ===
Mesoamerican literature was typically recorded on codices, though most surviving codices of pre-Columbian literature were written in the Latin alphabet to preserve oral tradition after colonization. Nahuatl literature was divided into cuícatl, which included song and poetry, and tlahtolli, which included prose works of history and discourses. The teocuícatl were divine hymns that were sung to praise the gods, while other Nahuatl poetry was sung in celebration of life and friendship, to honor warriors, or to pose philosophical questions. King Nezahualcoyotl of Tetzcoco was a notable poet and songwriter.

Literature in the Mayan languages was closely related to oral tradition in which writing guided memorized passages that were often performed. It was highly symbolic and incorporated heavy use of wordplay. Metaphor and imagery involving the natural world was also common. Mayan literature was often religious in nature, including information on religious practices, divination, and the gods. Much of this literature was later condemned as heretical and destroyed by Christian priests. The Dresden Codex, the Paris Codex, and the Madrid Codex are the only surviving pre-Columbian Mayan codices. Notable surviving Mayan texts include the Popol Vuh, the Chilam Balam, and the Annals of the Cakchiquels that describe the religious beliefs of Mesoamerican cultures.

== Early modern (15th century–18th century) ==
=== Early modern Europe ===
The Renaissance encompassed much of European culture during the early modern period. This period saw a renewed interested in the classical works of Ancient Greece and Rome and a proliferation of artistic and scientific achievement. Literature, as with most forms of art in the early modern period, was financed through patronage by nobles. Fiction writing was not considered a profession in its own right and was typically undertaken by those who already possessed independent wealth. The invention of the printing press in the mid-15th century revolutionized European literature. The production of printed books allowed for more uniformity in literary works and the spread of literacy. Religious literature in particular was affected by the printing press, as churches funded and involved themselves in the printing process. Literary criticism also developed as literary works became more accessible.

The form of writing now commonplace across the world—the novel—originated from the early modern period and grew in popularity in the next century. Before the modern novel became established as a form there first had to be a transitional stage when "novelty" began to appear in the style of the epic poem. Petrarch popularized the sonnet as a poetic form; Giovanni Boccaccio's Decameron made romance acceptable in prose as well as poetry; François Rabelais rejuvenates satire with Gargantua and Pantagruel; Michel de Montaigne single-handedly invented the essay and used it to catalog his life and ideas. Perhaps the most controversial and important work of the time period was a treatise printed in Nuremberg, entitled De Revolutionibus Orbium Coelestium: in it, the astronomer Nicolaus Copernicus removed the Earth from its privileged position in the universe, which had far-reaching effects, not only in science, but in literature and its approach to humanity, hierarchy, and truth.

Plays for entertainment (as opposed to religious enlightenment) returned to Europe's stages in the early modern period. William Shakespeare is the most notable of the early modern playwrights, but numerous others made important contributions, including Molière, Pierre Corneille, Jean Racine, Pedro Calderón de la Barca, Lope de Vega, Christopher Marlowe, and Ben Jonson. From the 16th to the 18th century Commedia dell'arte performers improvised in the streets of Italy and France. Some Commedia dell'arte plays were written down. Both the written plays and the improvisation were influential upon literature of the time, particularly upon the work of Molière. Shakespeare drew upon the arts of jesters and strolling players in creating new style comedies. All the parts, even the female ones, were played by men (en travesti) but that would change, first in France and then in England too, by the end of the 17th century.

==== British literature ====
As England grew to become a world power, focus on England itself appeared in English literature. This tradition began with The Faerie Queene by Edmund Spenser, written through the 1590s in honor of Queen Elizabeth I. Metaphysical poetry developed in the 17th century, led by John Donne, most well known for his love poems. The Augustan literature movement developed in the 18th century, led by Samuel Johnson, seeking to imitate the classical tastes of Ancient Greece and Rome. Augustan critics condemned metaphysical poetry for its frivolity and subversion. John Milton wrote the epic poem Paradise Lost to create an English Christian epic that rivaled those of Homer and Virgil. During the rule of Oliver Cromwell in the 1650s, the arts were restricted along Puritan ideals. This censorship contributed to the fall of the Commonwealth of England and the restoration of the British monarchy. Under the restored monarchy, the arts were freer than they had been previously, and King Charles II became a patron of the theater.

William Shakespeare was a famed playwright in the late-16th and early-17th centuries, and he is generally recognized as the greatest author in the English language. He is known for his comedies, his dramas, and his histories, as well as his use of blank verse, sonnet, and soliloquy. Shakespeare's historical plays ignored historical accuracy and often contemplated royal succession, reflecting the concerns of his day regarding the succession of Elizabeth I. Early English novels include The Pilgrim's Progress by John Bunyan and Oroonoko by Aphra Behn, both published in the 1680s. Bunyan introduced into English literature ideas of individualism and the quest of personal fulfillment. Behn used her writing as social criticism to question the Atlantic slave trade. Robinson Crusoe by Daniel Defoe is considered to be the first modern English novel, written as a celebration of the social mobility introduced by capitalism. The book was written in a realistic style, and the original edition was marketed as a true autobiography without any mention of Defoe as an author. Jonathan Swift introduced the fantasy novel to English literature, most notably through Gulliver's Travels, which was similarly marketed as a true story.

==== French literature ====
Gargantua and Pantagruel was written by François Rabelais in five parts throughout the mid-16th century. It was an early influence of the novel, using an informal style and subversive humor.

The 17th century in France is known as the Grand Siècle (Great Century). The most famous French authors, beside playwrights, include Jean de La Fontaine and Charles Perrault known primarily for their fables.

==== Italian literature ====
The Italian Renaissance was the starting point of what would become the European Renaissance over the following centuries.

The earliest work considered an opera in the sense the work is usually understood dates from around 1597. It is Dafne, (now lost) written by Jacopo Peri for an elite circle of literate Florentine humanists who gathered as the "Camerata".

==== Spanish literature ====
Don Quixote by Miguel de Cervantes was published in the early-17th century and is recognized as an early novel. It was a picaresque novel that parodied chivalric romance. The 16th and 17th centuries are recognized as the Spanish Golden Age.

=== Early modern East Asia ===
==== Qing dynasty ====
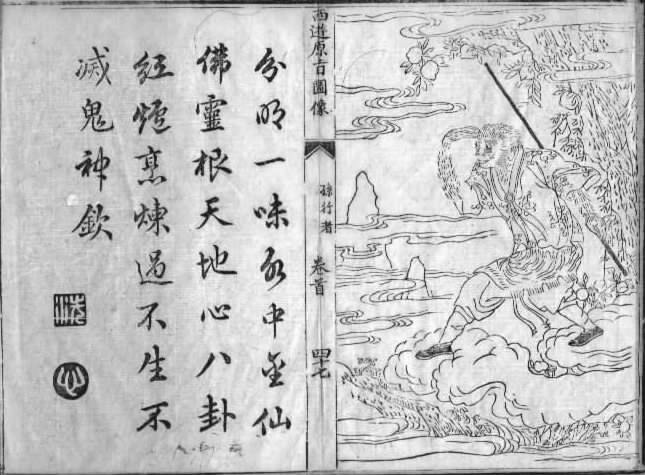
An illustrated copy of Journey to the West

Printing became prominent in China during the Ming dynasty in the beginning of the 16th century. By this time, urban areas were highly literate, assisted by the availability of paper in China. Written works were divided into four categories, including classics, histories, philosophy, and belles-lettres. Among the lower class, aria and folk songs were common, often performed by entertainers. Literature was suppressed by the Ming dynasty's founding Hongwu Emperor, and writers that did not comply with his rule were executed, beginning a decline in Chinese literature in the 14th and 15th centuries. Jiandeng Xinhua by Qu You was a collection of supernatural and chuanqi stories, and it was one of the few works that maintained influence despite the suppression of literature. Variety plays were the most common type of drama in the Early Ming period, and Prince Zhu Youdun was the most influential playwright of the time. A literary revival took place in the Middle Ming period. The revival of poetry was led by literary groups such as the Four Talents of Suzhou and the Earlier Seven Masters and continued by groups such as the Tang-Song School and the Latter Seven Masters. Xu Wei became an influential poet and prose writer after his death for his use of authenticity and his rejection of the preceding literary schools. Early Chinese novels were developed in the Middle Ming period, including works such as Water Margin, Romance of the Three Kingdoms, and Journey to the West.

In the Late Ming period, literature increasingly focused on the role of individuals within a society, beginning with the works of Li Zhi. Chinese philosophy developed humanist elements that challenged subservience to community and imperial hierarchy. The Gong'an School, led by the Three Yuan Brothers, produced literature of "natural sensibility" that favored delight and simplicity over reason and ambition. The Jingling School, led by Zhong Xing and Tan Yuanchun, was a response to the Gong'an School that accepted the concept of "natural sensibility" but rejected the carefree style of Gong'an poetry. Novels became more common in the Late Ming period as book publishers emerged. Jin Ping Mei is recognized as a great novel of the Late Ming period and the first novel to follow day-to-day life of commoners. Huaben stories were also common in this period, such as those collected by Feng Menglong in the Three Words and by Ling Mengchu in Slapping the Table in Amazement. Dramas became more common in the Late Ming period as it became fashionable for the aristocracy to entertain guests with private theater troupes. Tang Xianzu was an influential playwright of this period, and the Wujiang School led by Shen Jing was responsible for expanding upon drama as an artform with emphasis on its musical elements.

==== Japanese literature ====
Wood block printing became popular in the 17th century, and over a thousand books were sold annually by 1670. By the 17th century, increasing social divisions separated drama, with samurai watching noh and chōnin watching kabuki. Writers typically dedicated themselves to the government, to a specific clan, to the commons, or to a reclusive lifestyle. Ishikawa Jōzan was an influential 17th century poet.

==== Korean literature ====
Korean literature diverged from Chinese literature in the Joseon dynasty. The akjang, the sijo, and the gasa are forms of lyric composition that were popular in the Joseon dynasty. Yongbieocheonga was a major collection of poems produced in the 1440s. Korean vernacular fiction was developed by Hŏ Kyun at the beginning of the 17th century with Hong Gildong jeon. The structure of Hong Gildong jeon was used to develop heroic fiction. The Cloud Dream of the Nine was written by Kim Man-jung to reflect historical and philosophical changes of the time using dream structure. Pansori fiction was developed in the early 18th century.

== Late modern (18th century–20th century) ==
=== Late modern Europe ===
The 18th century was the Age of Enlightenment and its most important authors are Voltaire, Jean-Jacques Rousseau, Immanuel Kant and Adam Smith. The second half of the century sees the beginnings of Romanticism with Goethe. In the later 19th century, Romanticism is countered by Realism and Naturalism. The late 19th century, known as the Belle Époque, with its Fin de siècle retrospectively appeared as a "golden age" of European culture, cut short by the outbreak of World War I in 1914. Modernist literature was written from roughly 1900 to 1940.

In Britain, the 19th century was dominated by the Victorian era, characterized by Romanticism, with Romantic poets such as William Wordsworth, Lord Byron or Samuel Taylor Coleridge and genres such as the gothic novel. Charles Dickens, perhaps the most famous novelist in the history of English literature, was active during this time and contributed to the novel's emergence as the leading literary genre of Victorian England.

In Romania, the first novels were published in the 19th century by Dimitrie Bolintineanu and Nicolae Filimon. During the same century, one of the most-known Romanian poets was Mihai Eminescu.

In Denmark, the early 19th century Golden Age produced prolific literary authors such as Søren Kierkegaard and Hans Christian Andersen.

In Germany, the Sturm und Drang period of the late 18th century merges into a Classicist and Romantic period, epitomized by the long era of Goethe's activity, covering the first third of the century. The conservative Biedermeier style conflicts with the radical Vormärz in the turbulent period separating the end of the Napoleonic wars from the Revolutions of 1848.

=== United States ===
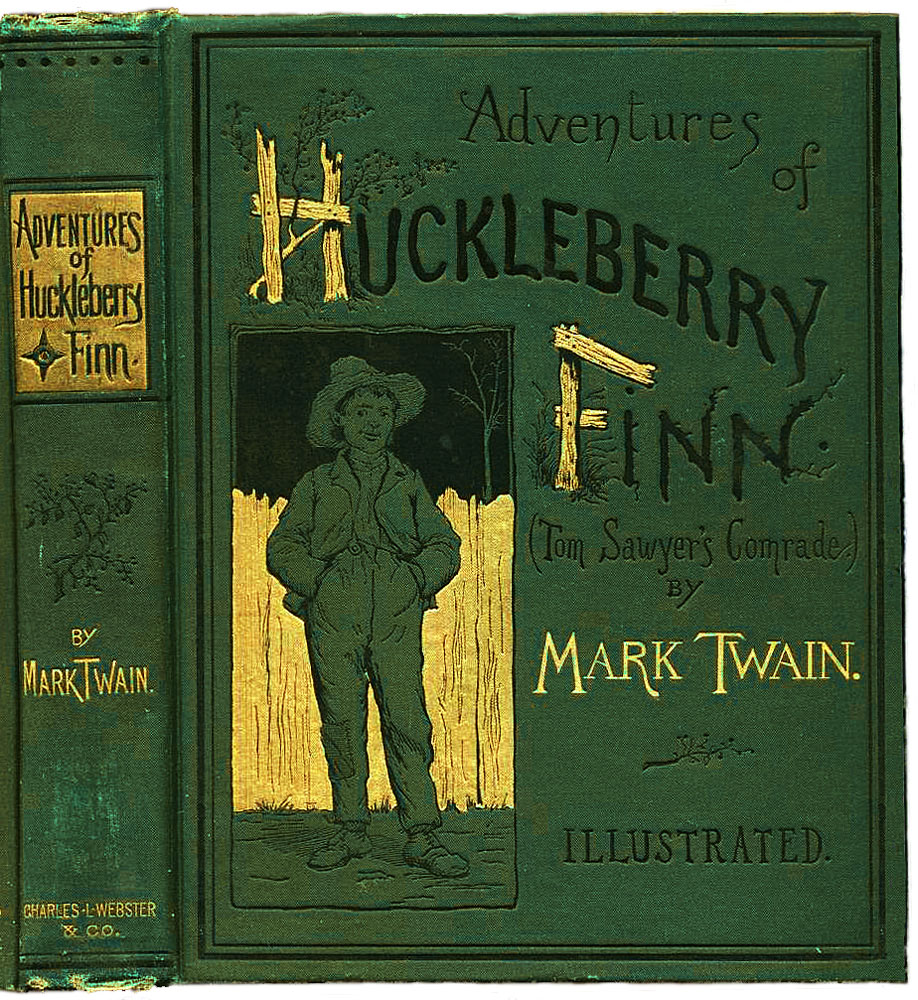
1884 cover of Adventures of Huckleberry Finn

Literature of the American Revolution included A Summary View of the Rights of British America by Thomas Jefferson and Common Sense by Thomas Paine. The Power of Sympathy by William Hill Brown was the first American novel, written in a realistic style with a clear moral message. Judith Sargent Murray is credited with establishing American feminism through her essays and poetry. The United States quickly achieved widespread literacy in the early-19th century, and many authors made fiction-writing their primary source of income. Washington Irving set precedent for comic literature and short stories, and he established the Knickerbocker School that wrote affectionately of New York. James Fenimore Cooper similarly set the precedent for American sea stories, novels of manners, political satire, dynastic novels, and frontier stories. Edgar Allan Poe was highly influential in fiction writing, poetry, and essays, and he is particularly credited for his contributions to Gothic fiction and mystery fiction as genres. Nathaniel Hawthorne wrote moralistic stories such as The Scarlet Letter inspired by colonial-era Puritan literature. Herman Melville explored human contradiction in sea stories such as Moby-Dick, though his work did not become influential until the 1920s. William Cullen Bryant was credited as the "founding father of American poetry", Walt Whitman is celebrated as defining the essence of America in his day with his poetry collection Leaves of Grass. Emily Dickinson was refused to publish her poetry during her lifetime, but her works of this period were later acclaimed.

Transcendentalism evolved as a philosophical school in the early-19th century, and authors such as Ralph Waldo Emerson contributed to transcendentalist literature. Many works were written on the topic of slavery in the early United States, including Uncle Tom's Cabin by Harriet Beecher Stowe. Freed slaves such as Frederick Douglass and Harriet Jacobs also wrote autobiographies that promoted the cause of abolitionism. Native American literature in the early-19th century was in conflict between retaining traditional elements and incorporating elements of contemporary American literature. Realism and naturalism became popular in the United States in the late-19th century. Mark Twain saw wide acclaim for his novels, including Adventures of Huckleberry Finn. Regionalism developed in which different literary traditions evolved in the West, the Midwest, the South, and New England. African American and Native American literature also evolved as distinct literary traditions.

A movement of backlash against small-town and middle-class values emerged at the beginning of the 20th century, including authors such as Theodore Dreiser, H. L. Mencken, Sinclair Lewis, and Sherwood Anderson. Civil rights literature of the early-20th century was written by authors such as W. E. B. Du Bois, Booker T. Washington, and James Weldon Johnson. American poetry expanded significantly during the 20th century, introducing or incorporating modernist poetry traditions such as Imagism, Vorticism, and Objectivism. Poets such as Edwin Arlington Robinson, Robert Frost, and Robinson Jeffers were influential in developing poetic form. Authors such as F. Scott Fitzgerald, Ernest Hemingway, and William Faulkner analyzed their own places in American society through modernist novels, while authors such as Thomas Wolfe and John Steinbeck sought to find a future identity for the United States. Counter-movements emerged in response to modernism, including traditionalism in the South and populism in Chicago literature. The early-20th century also saw the emergence of American drama distinct from that of Europe. Popular genre fiction at the time included westerns and detective fiction.

=== Canada ===
Early Canadian novels adapted the literary trends of Europe. The History of Emily Montague was the first Canadian novel, published in 1769. The aftermath of the Seven Years' War was a significant influence on Canadian literature in the 18th and 19th centuries as French Canada was transferred to the British. Popular novels, such as those of Julia Catherine Beckwith, came about in the early-19th century with an emphasis on day-to-day experiences rather than grand narrative. Nature featured prominently in Canadian literature by the mid-19th century. Edward Hartley Dewart was a prominent figure in early Canadian poetry, having published the first Canadian poetry anthology in 1864. He identified the formation of a Canadian literary body as a part of a conflict between colonial origins and a distinct Canadian identity. Octave Crémazie led the French Canadian literature movement in the 1860s. Notable Canadian poets of this period included Charles Sangster, Alexander McLachlan, Charles Heavysege, and the Confederation Poets. Victorian poetry remained prominent in Canada through the early-20th century, though international modernist movements such as Imagism gained influence after World War I. Poets such as Arthur Stringer and Frank Oliver Call lead a free verse movement in the 1910s and 1920s.

=== Latin America ===
Latin American literature diverged from European literature and began as its own literary tradition at the start of the 19th century. The primary change was in the subject matter and theme of the literature, while the form remained relatively European. It began with an individualist trend associated with the Latin American independence movements that were developing at the time. Within this movement developed the individual literature of each Latin American country as they formed their own national identities. Andrés Bello is recognized as a founder of modern literature in Hispanic America, and he is credited for popularizing Romanticism in the region. The balance of national and continental literary identities was a major issue in early Latin American literature, particularly within the Spanish language.

=== Late modern East Asia ===
==== Qing dynasty and Republic of China ====
The Qing dynasty saw the return of prose literature as a vehicle primarily for Confucian teaching, and individualist literature declined. The Three Masters of Jiangdong were the most prominent poets during the transition from Ming to Qing. Wang Shizhen led poetry trends in the Early Qing period through the expression of sentimentality through imagery and prosody rather than vocabulary, particularly with his Autumn Willows: Four Poems. Song lyrics also reemerged as a popular poetic form as literary critics viewed the individual aria as unrefined. Heroic fiction was adapted to popular novels in the Early Qing period. Supernatural fiction also became popular, including Strange Tales from a Chinese Studio by Pu Songling.

In the Middle Qing period, Shen Deqian, Weng Fanggang, and Yuan Mei each formed new trends in poetry in opposition to the style of Wang Shizhen. Pianwen became popular among prose writers in the Middle Qing period in opposition to the Tongcheng school. Six Records of a Floating Life was an autobiography by Shen Fu that emphasized direct language and emotional appeal over style. Performing arts of the Middle Qing period included the northern guci drum lyric and the southern tanci strummed lyric, the latter of which was often written by women poets. Novels of the Middle Qing period included The Scholars and Dream of the Red Chamber, both of which eschewed popular taste in favor of philosophy. Drama went out of fashion among the Qing literati, though theatrical performances remained common entertainment for the public. In the Late Qing period, Western culture was a significant influence on Chinese society. The Tongguang school was popular among adherents to typical Chinese poetry, styled after that of the Song dynasty. Chivalrous novels telling the tales of folk heroes, political novels that were critical of the falling Qing government, and genre fiction all became popular in the final years of the Qing dynasty.

Literature in the Republic of China reflected the societal changes brought about by the 1911 Revolution. Chinese literature broke away from classical tradition and literary restrictions with the New Literature Movement in 1919, beginning with works such as Experiments by Hu Shih, Diary of a Madman by Lu Xun, and The Goddess by Guo Moruo. The May Fourth Movement was a further cultural movement that promoted the use of vernacular Chinese. Advocates of liberal reform in China supported these shifts in literary tradition to challenge imperial institutions, and these works typically supported humanism and individualism. A refutation of individualism emerged in response at the onset of the Chinese Civil War, and revolutionary literature was spread in support of the Chinese Red Army.

== Contemporary (20th century–21st century) ==
Contemporary literature is defined as literature written after the end of World War II in 1945. Postmodern literature was written from roughly 1945 to 1980. Popular literature developed its own genres such as fantasy and science fiction. Ignored by mainstream literary criticism, these genres develop their own establishments and critical awards, such as the Nebula Award (since 1965), the British Fantasy Award (since 1971) or the Mythopoeic Awards (since 1971).

== See also ==
- History of art
- History of books
- History of fantasy
- History of film
- History of poetry
- History of science fiction
- History of theater
- Intellectual history
- Literature by country

== Bibliography ==
- Cohen, Walter (2017). A History of European Literature: The West and the World from Antiquity to the Present. Oxford University Press. ISBN 9780198732679.
- Gray, Richard (2011). A Brief History of American Literature. Wiley-Blackwell. ISBN 9781405192316.
- Kato, Shuichi (1997). A History of Japanese Literature: From the Man'yōshū to Modern Times. Translated by Sanderson, Don (New Abridged ed.). Japan Library. ISBN 1-873410-48-4.
- Lane, Richard J. (2011). The Routledge Concise History of Canadian Literature. Routledge.
- Lee, Peter H. (2003). A History of Korean Literature. Cambridge University Press. ISBN 9781139440868.
- Luo, Yuming (2011). A Concise History of Chinese Literature. Translated by Ye, Yang. Brill. ISBN 9789004203662.
- Sutherland, John (2013). A Little History of Literature. Yale University Press. ISBN 9780300188363.
