= Feng Ban =

Chinese poet and calligrapher

Feng Ban (simplified Chinese: 冯班; traditional Chinese: 馮班; pinyin: Féng Bān; Wade–Giles: Feng Pan; 1602–1671) was a Chinese poet and calligrapher from Changshu, Jiangsu, during the time of the late Ming dynasty and early Qing dynasty. His courtesy name was Dingyuan 定遠, his style Dunyin Laoren 鈍吟老人.

He is especially known for his collection Dunyin zalu (simplified Chinese: 钝吟杂录; traditional Chinese: 鈍吟雜錄; Wade–Giles: Tun-yin tsa-lu), a biji collection with miscellaneous sketches, which the Hanyu da zidian f.e. is using in the edition of the Jieyueshanfang huichao 借月山房汇钞.

According to the short biography in the Draft History of Qing (Qingshi gao), he strongly opposed Yan Yu in his views on poetry; he particularly rejected the Jiangxi school, and stylistically moved between Li Shangyin (Yishan), Du Mu (Muzhi), and Wen Tingyun (Feiqing).

== Works ==
- Dunyin zalu 鈍吟雜錄 (collection)
- Dunyin shuyao 鈍吟書要
- Dingyuan ji 定遠集 (collected writings)
- Dunyin ji 鈍吟集
- Dunyin shiwen gao 鈍吟詩文稿
- Pingdian caidiao ji 評點才調集

== See also ==
- Jiangxi shipai 江西诗派

== Bibliography ==
- Qingshi gao 清史稿, juan 484 (Feng Ban 馮班) - Chinese
- Li Xueqin, Lü Wenyu (eds.): Siku da cidian 四庫大辭典, 2 vols., Changchun: Jilin daxue chubanshe 1996 (vol. 2, p. 2021b: Dunyin zalu)
- Wei-Ping Liu: A Study of the Development of Chinese Poetic Theories in the Ch'ing Dynasty (1644-1911). 1967 (Diss. University of Sydney)
