= James Liu =

James Liu may refer to:

- James T. C. Liu (Chinese: 劉子健, 1919–1993), historian of China
- James J. Y. Liu (Chinese: 劉若愚, 1926–1986), scholar of Chinese literature

== See also ==
- James Lau (born 1950), Hong Kong official
