= Short Biography of Li He =

Chinese poet

The Short Biography of Li He (traditional Chinese: 李賀小傳; simplified Chinese: 李贺小传; pinyin: lǐ hè xiǎo chuán) is the earliest surviving record of the life of the Chinese poet Li He (c. 790 – c. 816). It was compiled by the poet Li Shangyin. Du Mu's preface to the collected poems of Li He, which predates the Short Biography, was compiled in 831, but it contains almost no biographical details on Li. Other, later, biographies are given in chapter 137 of the Old Book of Tang and chapter 203 of the New Book of Tang.

== Contents ==
The work opens with an allusion to Du Mu's preface, and contrasts the "curiosity" of Li's poetry as discussed by Du Mu with the actual account of the man Li which the Short Biography purports to give. The opening passages also make a claim to being based on an account of Li given by his elder sister. The work's physical description of Li ("skinny, unibrow, long fingernails") resembles that given to Taoist immortals in hagiographies such as the Liexian Zhuan.

The Short Biography goes on to discuss Li's poetic composition and his friendships with the renowned poet Han Yu, Wang Shenyuan (王參元/王参元), Yang Jingzhi (楊敬之/杨敬之), Quan Qu (權璩/权璩) and Cui Zhi.

== Analysis ==
Japanese scholar Hidenobu Wada speculates this was included not only to lend the work an air of credibility as coming from someone who knew the subject intimately, but also to tell the reader that the work would be an account of the "private" as opposed to "public" life of the poet. He attributes it to this reason, for example, that the Short Biography completely neglects the notorious incident in which Li was prevented from pursuing a public service career because of a naming taboo, which saw Li famously defended by Han Yu.

Wada further speculates that Wang Shenyuan, who was the younger brother of Li Shangyin's father-in-law Wang Maoyuan (王茂元), was the husband of Li He's sister.

== Works cited ==
- Endō, Seiki (15 April 2005). "Gafu Bungaku Shijō ni okeru Ri Ga no Ichi: "Fuzan Takashi" ni motozuku kōsatsu" (PDF). Tōkyō Daigaku Chūgokugo Chūgoku Bungaku Kenkyūshitsu Kiyō (in Japanese). 8 (1). University of Tokyo: 1–24. Archived from the original (PDF) on 2 February 2017.
- Fukazawa, Kazuyuki (2013). "Li He (Ri Ga in Japanese)". In Ozaki, Yūichirō; Chikusa, Masaaki; Togawa, Yoshio (eds.). Chūgoku Bunkashi Daijiten 中国文化史大事典 (in Japanese). Vol. 1. Tokyo: Taishūkan Shoten. pp. 1219–1220. ISBN 978-4469012842.
- Morise, Toshizō (1975). "Ri Ga (791–817): Shin Tō Sho kan 203". In Ogawa, Tamaki (ed.). Tōdai no Shijin: Sono Denki 唐代の詩人 : その伝記. Tokyo: Taishūkan Shoten. pp. 477–484.
- Wada, Hidenobu (28 April 2001). "Ri Ga to iu shijin-zō: Ri Shōin 'Ri Ga Shō Den' to Ri Ga no monogatari". Ochanomizu Joshi Daigaku Daigaku Chūgoku Bungaku Kaihō (in Japanese). 20 (1). Ochanomizu University: 50–68. Archived from the original on 2017-09-17.
