= Fuchang County =

Former administrative division of Henan, China

Fuchang (Chinese: 福昌) was a county of China during the Tang and Song dynasties, under the administration of Henan Prefecture (Henanfu, modern Luoyang). It was renamed as Fuqing (福庆) County during the Later Tang dynasty, but reverted to its original name in 960 during the Song. The county seat was located in modern Fuchang Village of Yiyang County, Henan Province, 27 kilometers west of downtown Yiyang. Tang dynasty poet Li He was a native of Fuchang County. In 1072 the county was abolished and merged into Shou'an County, which was renamed as Yiyang in 1186.
