= Gao Bing =

Chinese poet and anthologist

Gao Bing (高棅, 1350 to 1423), was a Chinese poetry anthologist and poet. A native of Fuzhou, he flourished during the newly established Ming dynasty (1368–1644) as an author and poetry theorist. Gao Bing collected and arranged Tang poetry-era poems and wrote commentary material upon them in a work published as the Graded Compendium of Tang Poetry (Tangshi Pinhui, 唐詩品彙), a seminal work using prosodic principles in a systematic method to classify poetry by Classical Chinese poetry forms. It contained 5,769 poems by 620 poets, along with notes and commentary. The Tangshi Pinhui aimed in part to correct what Gao Bing saw as lacking in previous works, particularly those of Song critic Yan Yu and Yuan critic Yang Shihong (fl 1340). Other works would later build upon the Tangshi Pinhui system which would later greatly influence the perception of Chinese poetry: in part because of Gao Bing's explicit nine-rank grading system (similar to the nine-rank grading system of the Imperial examination system), by which he evaluated the works of poets such as Du Fu, Li Bai, and Wang Wei.

== Gao's Pinhui ranking system ==
Gao Bing's ranking system for qualifying Tang dynasty poetry used a 9-rank system. The lowest rank which Gao declared worthy of inclusion in his Tang Shi Ping Hui was what he referred to as zhengshi (正始). Zhengshi is translatable as "pioneers of orthodoxy". The highest ranking classes of poetry (and thus rated most worthy of study and emulation), reserved for the 8th century, "High Tang" poetry were the "patriarchs" (zhengzong, 正宗) and the "masters", dajia (大家) and mingjia (名家).

== See also ==
- Three Hundred Tang Poems, another Ming dynasty Tang poetry anthology
