= Li Yishan wenji =

9th-century Chinese literary collection

Li Yishan wenji (simplified Chinese: 李义山文集; traditional Chinese: 李義山文集; Wade–Giles: Li I-shan wen-chi; "Literary Collection of Li Yishan") refers to the collected works of Li Yishan, i.e. the literary anthology of the famous late Tang dynasty Chinese poet Li Shangyin (李商隱) (813–858), whose courtesy name was Yishan. It is a key source for his profound poetry and prose, often found in compilations like the Sibu congkan (Four Branches of Literature).

His poems are collected under the title Yuxi sheng shizhu 玉谿生诗注 in the same collectaneum Sibu congkan, there is also a Qing time commentary under the titel Yuxi Sheng shiji jianzhu 玉谿生诗集笺注 (Shanghai guji chubanshe, 1979).

== Bibliography ==
The Hanyu da zidian (HYDZD) uses the edition of the Sibu congkan (SBCK) and the following five editions and comments, all from the time of the Qing dynasty:

- Zhu Heling 朱鹤龄: Li Yishan shizhu 李义山诗注 (Siku quanshu 四库全书)
- Ji Yun dianlun 纪昀点论: Li Yishan shiji 李义山诗集 (Jingyantang shizhong 镜烟堂十种)
- Qian Zhenlun 钱振伦, Qian Zhenchang zhu 钱振常注: Fannan wenji bubian 樊南文集补编>> (Sibu beiyao 四部备要)
- Feng Hao 冯浩: Fannan wenji xiangzhu 樊南文集详注 (Sibu beiyao 四部备要)
- Xu Shugu 徐树谷, Xu Jiong 徐炯: Li Yishan wenji jianzhu 李义山文集笺注 (Chizaotang Siku quanshu huiyao 摛藻堂四库全书荟要)

== See also ==
- Sibu congkan (Chinese)

== Bibliography ==
- Hanyu da zidian. 1993 (one-volume edition)
