= François Jullien =

French philosopher, hellenist and sinologist (born 1951)

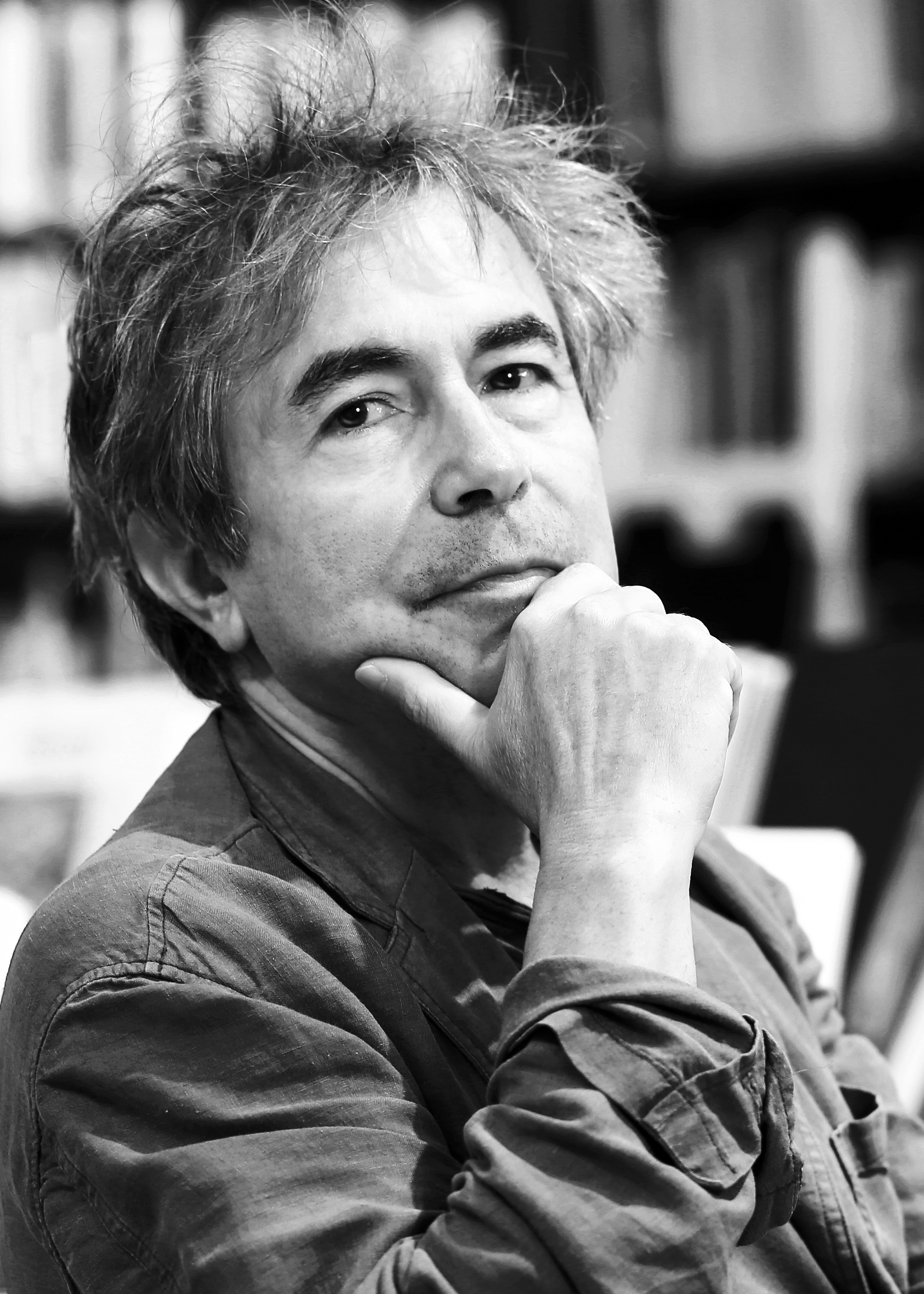
- Fondation des Treilles
- Born: 2 June 1951 (age 75); Embrun, Hautes-Alpes, France

Philosophical work
- Era: Contemporary philosophy
- Main interests: Chinese philosophy

François Jullien (born 2 June 1951) is a French philosopher, Hellenist, and sinologist.

== Biography ==
An alumnus of the École Normale Supérieure (Paris) and holder (since 1974) of the agrégation, France's professorial degree, François Jullien studied Chinese language and taught at Peking University and Shanghai University from 1975 to 1977. He received his French university doctorate (doctorat de troisième cycle) in 1978 and his French research doctorate (doctorat d'État) in Far East studies in 1983.

Since then Jullien has been head of the Antenne Française de Sinologie in Hong Kong (1978–1981), a guest of the Maison Franco-Japonaise in Tokyo (1985–1987), president of the Association Française d'Etudes Chinoises (1988–1990), director of the East Asia department (UFR) of Paris Diderot University–Paris VII (1990–2000), president of the Collège International de Philosophie (1995–1998), professor at Paris Diderot University, and director of both the Institut de la Pensée Contemporaine and the Centre Marcel-Granet.

He was a senior member of the Institut Universitaire de France from 2001 to 2011 and is the current Chair of Alterity at the Fondation Maison des Sciences de l'Homme (Paris).

Jullien has edited several anthologies for the Presses Universitaires de France (PUF) and for the Agenda de la Pensée Contemporaine, the latter published first by PUF, then by Éditions Hermann. Several conferences dealing with his philosophy have been held in France and abroad (Germany, Argentina, China, Vietnam). Among the most recent are:

- "Dérangements-aperçus: autour du travail de François Jullien" (conference proceedings published by Hermann, 2011), at Paris Diderot University and the Bibliothèque Nationale de France (December 2010)
- "Dialogue au sommet" with Chung-ying Cheng (proceedings published as Sixiang yu fangfa, December 2014), at the Beijing Normal University (December 2012)
- "Des possibles de la pensée, l'itinéraire philosophique de François Jullien" (proceedings to be published by Hermann, 2015), in Cerisy-la-Salle (September 2013)
- A conference at the Academia Sinica, Taiwan (November 2013; proceedings to be published by the Academia Sinica in spring 2015)

Jullien received the Hannah Arendt Prize for Political Thought in Germany in 2010 and the Grand Prix de Philosophie of the Académie Française for his body of work in 2011.

Marcel Gauchet has summed up François Jullien's work in the following terms: "The work of François Jullien seems to me to follow the grand lines of the unwritten but oh-so-influential program of what I shall call the twentieth-century anthropological school. Primarily but not exclusively French, this school came to fruition in the work of Durkheim, Mauss, Granet, Lévi-Strauss, and a few others as well. It is, in a word, the school of Western decentralization. [...] These various undertakings have made it possible for us to conceive of an "outside" ["dehors"], to borrow a particularly felicitous term from François Jullien. [ ... ] But François Jullien is not content to contribute to this most difficult of enterprises. He has brought the decentralization to its fulfilment, for he has turned it back on the West. In particular, he has done this in the field of philosophy, something no one had ever done before, and by taking on China's alterity, which, it must be said, provided a privileged standpoint. He has thus carried decentralization further than his predecessors. He has shown us how to look from 'elsewhere' at our most theoretical and abstract thought, dealing with the fundamental categories that allow us to apprehend any object spontaneously. He has become the ethnologist of our conceptual universe."

When Jullien was awarded the Grand Prix de Philosophie of the Académie Française (2011), Angelo Rinaldi presented his work as follows: "The variety of subjects this philosopher-sinologist has taken on could lead one to imagine a scattershot oeuvre. On the contrary, there is in François Jullien's work a strong unity of thought and a clear progression. Pierre Nora sums it up in a phrase: the thought that lies between China and Greece. The purpose, indeed, is to consider the unthought-of in our thought, which has arisen on the foundations laid by Greece. To this end, China offers an oblique way in, a chance to redirect our gaze upon ourselves and see ourselves from without. The priority for François Jullien is to constitute this exteriority, and the remainder of his work consists of a reevaluation of the foundations of European thought. Awaiting us at the far end of this road are the general questions that interest us all directly: does 'the universal' exist, what might we hold in 'common,' what is the meaning of 'unity,' 'difference,' or 'conformity'? What we now call the 'dialogue of cultures' is clearly at the center of this philosopher's concerns, and it is this ever-present theme that makes him relevant for us today."

François Jullien is among the most translated of contemporary thinkers, with works appearing in some twenty-five countries. More than twenty of his essays have been translated into German, Italian, and Spanish, and a dozen have been translated into English, Chinese, Vietnamese, and Portuguese.

== Work and concepts ==
Since first establishing what he refers to as his philosophical construction yard (chantier) to explore the écart between Chinese and European thought François Jullien has been organizing a vis-à-vis between cultures, rather than comparing them, so as to map out a common field for reflection. His work has led him to examine such various disciplines as ethics, aesthetics, strategy, and the systems of thought (pensées) of both History and nature. The aim of this "deconstruction" from without (du dehors) is to detect buried biases, in both cultures, as well as to elucidate the unthought-of (l'impensé) in our thought. It serves also to bring out the resources (ressources) or fecundities (fécondités) of languages and cultures, rather than consider them from the perspective of their "difference" or "identity." Moreover, it launches philosophy anew by extricating it from the bog of its atavisms and purging it of facile notions (évidences). The enterprise has not failed to raise hackles in both philosophical and Orientalist circles. Jullien has argued in response that the way to produce the common (produire du commun) is to put écarts to work. Because they establish distance, écarts bring out "the between" ("l'entre") and put our reflection into tension. "The similar" ("le semblable"), on the other hand, produces only what is uniform, which we then mistake for "universals." Within this construction yard between the languages and systems of thought of China and Europe, Jullien has since developed a philosophy of "living" (philosophie du "vivre"). This marks a departure from Being, the major bias of Greek philosophy. The result is a general philosophy that unfolds (se déploie) as a philosophy of existence. Some of Jullien's recent developments in this area include reflections on intimacy ("l'intime") and "landscape" ("paysage"). For a survey of Jullien's work, see De l'Être au vivre, lexique euro-chinois de la pensée, Gallimard, 2015. The readership for Jullien's work has been expanding of late beyond the disciplines of Orientalism and philosophy. The world of management has begun to adopt such concepts as situational potential (potentiel de situation), as opposed to "plans of action"; maturation (of conditions), as opposed to projected modelizations; and the initiation of silent transformations ("transformations silencieuses"), to induce change rather than impose it. Cf. A Treatise on Efficacy, 2004; Conférence sur l'efficacité, 2005. The world of psychology and analysis has begun to adopt the concept of "silent transformation" (cf. The Silent Transformations, 2011); the distinction between the word and speech (cf. Si parler va sans dire, 2006); and the concepts of the allusive (l'allusif), availability (la disponibilité), indirectness (le biais), and obliquity (l'obliquité) (cf. Cinq concepts proposés à la psychanalyse, 2012). The art world has begun to adopt the concepts of silent transformation; of the "great image" ("The great image has no form"); of soaring (l'essor) and slackness (l'étale) (slackness is what is determined, what has completely come to pass, and has therefore lost its effect; soaring is the upstream of the effect, when the effect is still occurring, still at work, and has not yet gone slack); of the frontal and the oblique (evocation, being oblique, might be preferable to representation, which is frontal: "paint the clouds so as to evoke the moon"); of coherence, as opposed to sense (if a work does not deliver a "sense," then is it not co-herence that confers the work's con-sistency, that makes it "hold together" as a work?); of the evasive, as opposed to the assignable); of the allusive, as opposed to the symbolic. The art world has also begun to adopt the concepts of the écart and the between (l'entre). Because it is based on distinction, difference specifies an essence and stores it away as knowledge. An écart, however, establishes a distance and thus maintains a tension between the things it separates. Even while producing its disturbance, the écart brings forth a between, precisely because of the distance established. If the "between" is the thing of which ontology cannot conceive—because it has no in-itself: i.e., no essence—it is also the space through which [the thing] passes, or occurs: the space of the operatory and the effective. Cf. In Praise of Blandness, 1997; The Impossible Nude, 2007; The Great Image Has No Form, 2012; This Strange Idea of the Beautiful, 2016.

In 2025, François Jullien develops the concept of pensivity, regarding the effect of literature on the human mind.

== Works ==
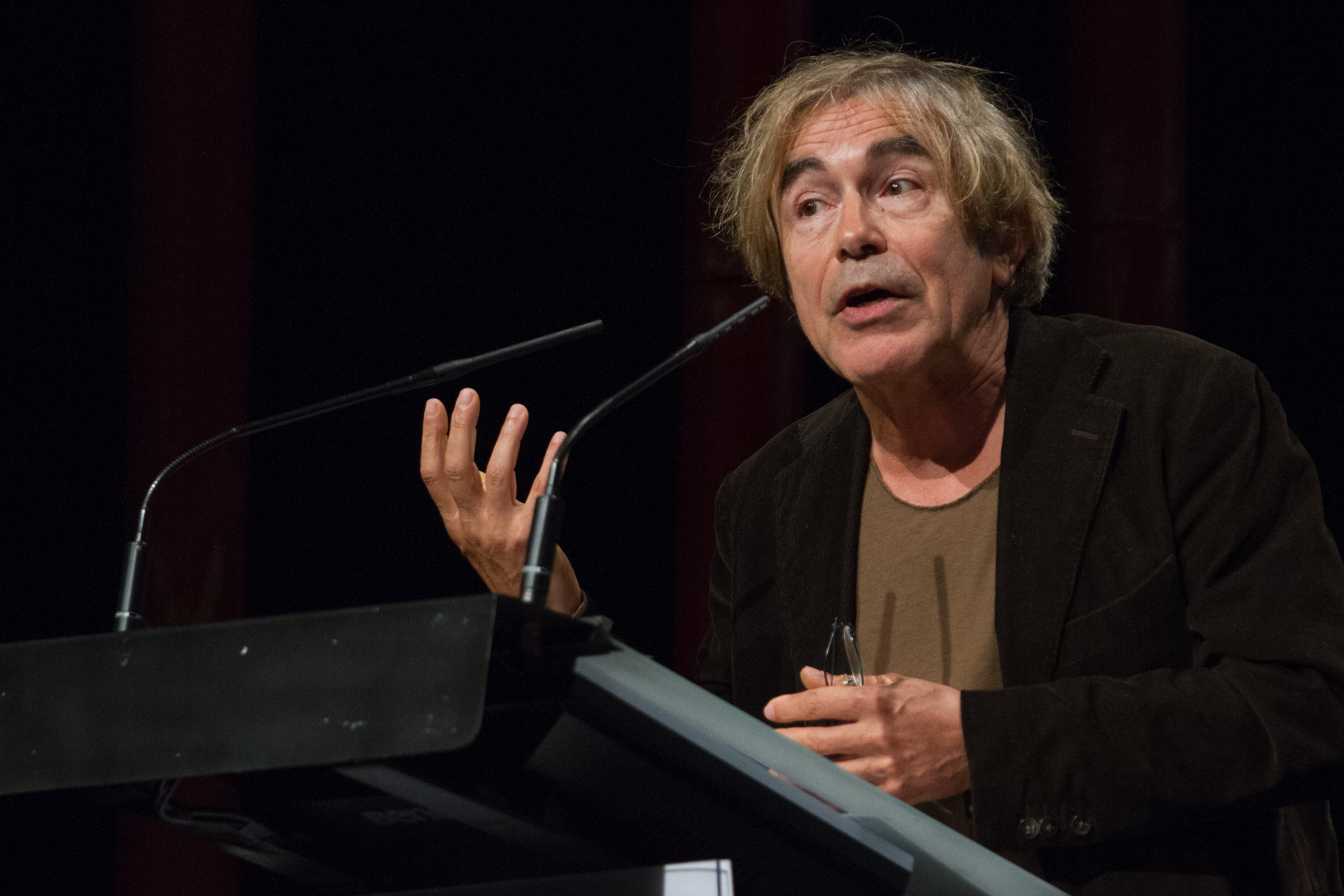
François Jullien at the International Geography Festival of Saint-Dié-des-Vosges, October 2013

Translated into English:

- The Propensity of Things, Toward a History of Efficacy in China (La propension des choses), Zone Books, New York, 1995
- Detour and Access, Strategies of Meaning in China and Greece (Le détour et l'accès), Zone books, New York, 2000
- In Praise of Blandness, Proceeding from Chinese Thought and Aesthetics (Eloge de la fadeur), Zone books, New York, 2004
- A Treatise on Efficacy: Between Western and Chinese Thinking (Traité de l'efficacité), University of Hawaii Press, Honolulu, 2004.
- Vital Nourishment: Departing from Happiness (Nourrir sa vie: à l'écart du bonheur), Zone books, Brooklin, 2007.
- The Impossible Nude, Chinese Art and Western Aesthetics (Le nu impossible), The University of Chicago Press, 2007
- The Silent Transformations (Les transformations silencieuses), Seagull, London New-York Calcutta, 2011.
- The Great Image has no Form (La grande image n'a pas de forme), University of Chicago Press, Chicago, London, 2012.
- On the Universal, the Uniform, the Common and Dialogue between cultures (De l'universel, de l'uniforme, du commun et du dialogue entre les cultures), Polity, Cambridge, 2014.
- The Book of Beginnings (Entrer dans une pensée), Yale University Press, New Heaven & London, 2015.
- This Strange Idea of the Beautiful (Cette étrange idée du beau), Seagull, London New-York Calcutta, 2016.
- The Philosophy of Living (Philosophie du vivre), Seagull, London New-York Calcutta, 2016.
- Conversation between Huang Yong Ping and François Jullien, Our Worlds in Tongues, Editions Kamel Mennour, 2016
- De-coincidence: Where Art and Existence Come From (Dé-coïncidence, D’où viennent l’art et l’existence), National Taiwan University of the Arts, Taipei, 2017.

Currently being translated:

- Vivre de paysage, Rowman & Littlefield, Londres.
- De l'être au vivre, lexique euro-chinois de la pensée, Sage, Londres.

In French:

- Lu Xun. Écriture et révolution, Presses de l’École Normale Supérieure, 1979.
- La Valeur allusive. Des catégories originales de l’interprétation poétique dans la tradition chinoise, École Française d’Extrême-Orient, 1985.
- La Chaîne et la trame. Du canonique, de l’imaginaire et de l’ordre du texte en Chine, Extrême-Orient/Extrême-Occident, no. 5, 11 and 12, Presses Universitaires de Vincennes; new edition in the Quadrige collection, PUF, 2004.
- Procès ou Création. Une introduction à la pensée des lettrés chinois, Seuil, 1989.
- Éloge de la fadeur. À partir de la pensée et de l’esthétique de la Chine, Philippe Picquier, 1991. Translated as In Praise of Blandness: Proceeding from Chinese Thought and Aesthetics, Zone Books, 2007.
- La Propension des choses. Pour une histoire de l’efficacité en Chine, Seuil, 1992. Translated as The Propensity of Things: Toward a History of Efficacy in China, Zone Books, 1995.
- Figures de l’immanence. Pour une lecture philosophique du Yi king, Grasset, 1993.
- Le Détour et l’Accès. Stratégies du sens en Chine, en Grèce, Grasset, 1995. Translated as Detour and Access: Strategies of Meaning in China and Greece, MIT Press, 2004.
- Fonder la morale. Dialogue de Mencius avec un philosophe des Lumières, Grasset, 1995.
- Traité de l’efficacité, Grasset, 1997. Translated as A Treatise on Efficacy, University of Hawaii Press, 2004.
- Un sage est sans idée ou L’Autre de la philosophie, Seuil, 1998.
- De l’Essence ou Du nu, Seuil, 2000. Translated as The Impossible Nude: Chinese Art and Western Aesthetics, University of Chicago Press, 2007.
- Du « temps ». Éléments d’une philosophie du vivre, Grasset, 2001.
- La Grande image n’a pas de forme ou Du non-objet par la peinture, Seuil, 2003. Translated as The Great Image Has No Form, or On the Nonobject through Painting, University of Chicago Press, 2012.
- L’ombre au tableau. Du mal ou du négatif, Seuil, 2004.
- Nourrir sa vie. À l’écart du bonheur, Seuil, 2005. Translated as Vital Nourishment: Departing from Happiness, Zone Books, 2007.
- Conférence sur l’efficacité, PUF, 2005.
- Si parler va sans dire. Du logos et d’autres ressources, Seuil, 2006.
- Chemin faisant, connaître la Chine, relancer la philosophie. Réplique à ***, Seuil, 2006.
- De l’universel, de l’uniforme, du commun et du dialogue entre les cultures, Fayard, 2008. Translated as On the Universal, the Common and Dialogue between Cultures, Polity, 2014.
- L’invention de l’idéal et le destin de l’Europe, Seuil, 2009.
- Les Transformations silencieuses, Grasset, 2009.
- Cette étrange idée du beau, Grasset, 2010. Translated as This Strange Idea of the Beautiful, Seagull Books, 2015.
- Le Pont des singes (De la diversité à venir). Fécondité culturelle face à identité nationale, Galilée, 2010.
- Philosophie du vivre, Gallimard, 2011.
- Entrer dans une pensée ou Des possibles de l’esprit, Gallimard, 2012.
- L’écart et l’entre. Leçon inaugurale de la Chaire sur l’altérité, Galilée, 2012.
- Cinq concepts proposés à la psychanalyse, Grasset, 2012.
- De l’intime. Loin du bruyant Amour, Grasset, 2013.
- Vivre de paysage ou L’impensé de la Raison, Gallimard, 2014.
- Vivre en existant, une nouvelle Ethique, Gallimard, 281 p., 2016.
- Près d'elle, présence opaque, présence intime, Galilée, 2016; German translation (Passagen Verlag, Vienna); Italian translation (Mimesis, Milan).
- Il n'y a pas d'identité culturelle, Éd. de l’Herne, 2016.
- Une seconde vie, Grasset, 2017.
- Dé-coïncidence. D'où viennent l'art et l'existence?, Grasset, 2017.
- Si près tout autre, De l'écart et de la rencontre, Grasset, 2018.
- Ressources du christianisme, Mais sans y entrer par la foi, Éd. de L'Herne, 2018.
- L'inouï, Grasset, 2019.
- De l'écart à l'inouï, Éd. de L'Herne, 2019.
- De la vraie vie, Éditions de l'Observatoire, 2020.
- Politique de la décoïncidence, Éd. de L'Herne, 2020.
- Ce Point obscur d'où tout a basculé, Éditions de l'Observatoire, 2021.
- Moïse ou la Chine. Quand ne se déploie pas l'idée de Dieu, Éditions de l'Observatoire, 2022.
- L’Incommensurable, Éditions de l'Observatoire, 2022.
- Rouvrir des possibles. Décoïncidence, un art d'opérer, Éditions de l'Observatoire, 2023.
- La Transparence du matin, Éditions de l'Observatoire, 2023.
- Raviver de l'esprit en ce monde, un diagnostic du contemporain, Éditions de l'Observatoire, 2023.
- Dieu est dé-coïncidence, Labor et Fides, 2024.
- Puissance du pensif, Actes Sud, 2025.
