= Yiyang County, Henan =

Yiyang County 宜阳县
- County
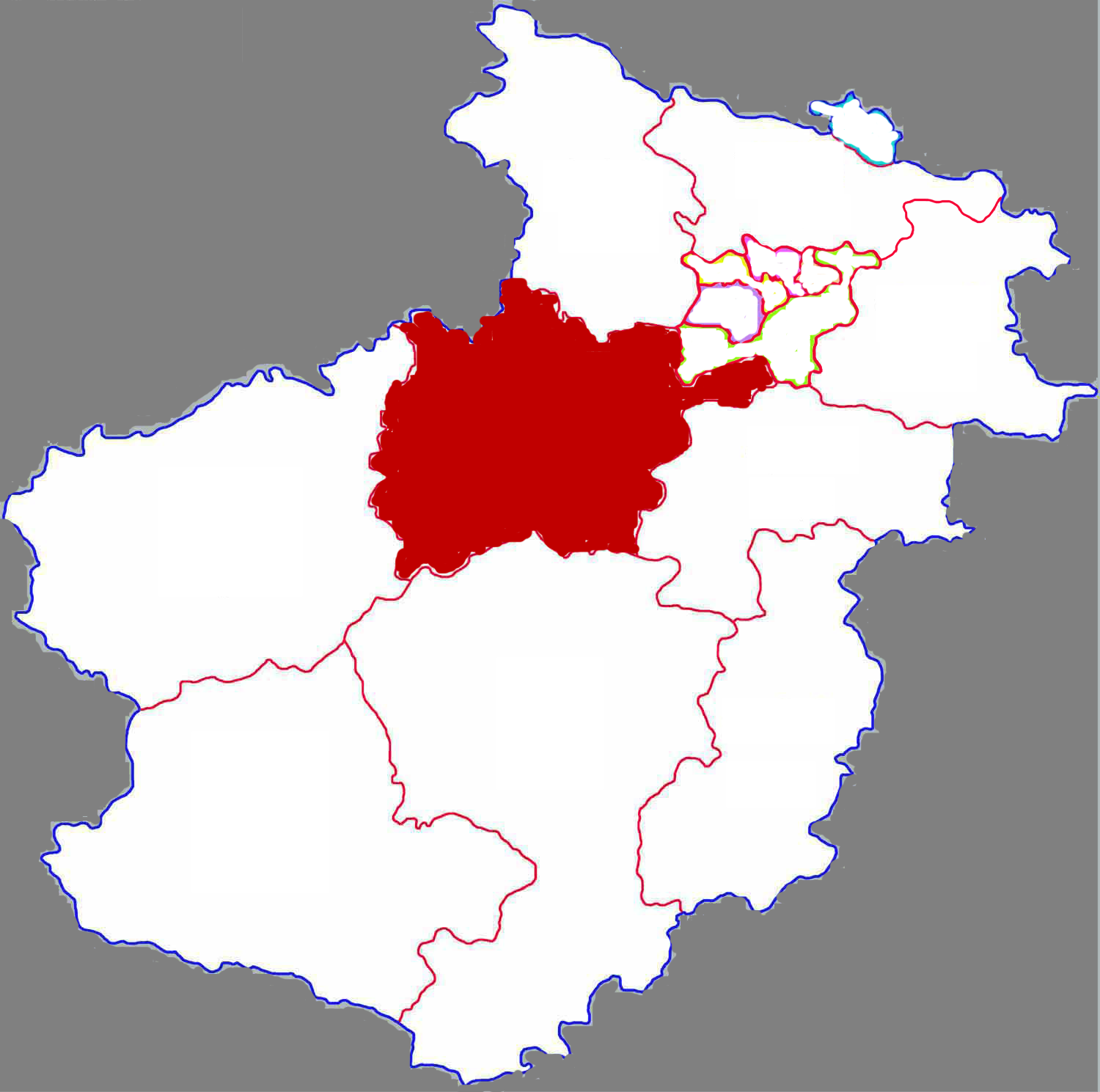
- Yiyang in Luoyang

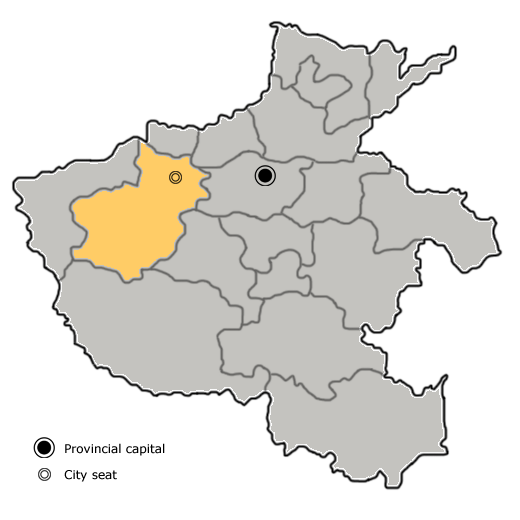
- Luoyang in Henan
- Coordinates: 34°30′53″N 112°10′45″E
- Country: People's Republic of China
- Province: Henan
- Prefecture-level city: Luoyang

Area
  - Total: 1,666 km^{2} (643 sq mi)

Population (2019)
  - Total: 608,300
  - Density: 365.1/km^{2} (945.7/sq mi)
- Time zone: UTC+8 (China Standard)
- Postal code: 471600

Yiyang County, Henan
- Traditional Chinese: 宜陽縣
- Simplified Chinese: 宜阳县
- Hanyu Pinyin: Yíyáng Xiàn
Transcriptions
Standard Mandarin
- Hanyu Pinyin: Yíyáng Xiàn

Yiyang is a county under the administration of the prefecture-level city of Luoyang city, Henan province, China, historically called Shou'an County (simplified Chinese: 寿安县; traditional Chinese: 壽安縣). Fuchang County of the Tang and Song dynasties was located in Yiyang. In 1072, Fuchang was merged into Shou'an, and in 1186, Shou'an was renamed as Yiyang.

== Administrative divisions ==
As of 2012, this county is divided to 7 towns and 10 townships.

Towns

- Chengguan (城关镇)
- Fengli (丰李镇)
- Liuquan (柳泉镇)
- Hancheng (韩城镇)
- Baiyang (白杨镇)
- Xuncun (寻村镇)
- Jinping (锦屏镇)

Townships

- Yanzhen Township (盐镇乡)
- Gaocun Township (高村乡)
- Sanxiang Township (三乡乡)
- Zhangwu Township (张坞乡)
- Muce Township (穆册乡)
- Shangguan Township (上观乡)
- Lianzhuang Township (莲庄乡)
- Zhaobao Township (赵堡乡)
- Dongwangzhuang Township (董王庄乡)
- Xiangcun Township (樊村乡)

== Climate ==
Climate data for Yiyang, elevation 195 m (640 ft), (1991–2020 normals, extremes 1991–present)
Month	Jan	Feb	Mar	Apr	May	Jun	Jul	Aug	Sep	Oct	Nov	Dec	Year
Record high °C (°F)	21.1 (70.0)	26.9 (80.4)	32.6 (90.7)	40.4 (104.7)	39.6 (103.3)	42.8 (109.0)	41.1 (106.0)	39.7 (103.5)	39.1 (102.4)	33.2 (91.8)	28.6 (83.5)	23.7 (74.7)	42.8 (109.0)
Mean daily maximum °C (°F)	6.6 (43.9)	10.4 (50.7)	15.7 (60.3)	23.2 (73.8)	28.0 (82.4)	32.3 (90.1)	32.3 (90.1)	30.5 (86.9)	26.6 (79.9)	21.5 (70.7)	14.7 (58.5)	8.5 (47.3)	20.9 (69.6)
Daily mean °C (°F)	1.2 (34.2)	4.5 (40.1)	9.5 (49.1)	16.3 (61.3)	21.5 (70.7)	26.0 (78.8)	27.2 (81.0)	25.5 (77.9)	21.0 (69.8)	15.5 (59.9)	8.8 (47.8)	3.2 (37.8)	15.0 (59.0)
Mean daily minimum °C (°F)	−2.8 (27.0)	0.1 (32.2)	4.5 (40.1)	10.6 (51.1)	15.8 (60.4)	20.4 (68.7)	23.2 (73.8)	22.0 (71.6)	17.0 (62.6)	11.2 (52.2)	4.5 (40.1)	−0.7 (30.7)	10.5 (50.9)
Record low °C (°F)	−10.9 (12.4)	−10.5 (13.1)	−6.4 (20.5)	0.2 (32.4)	5.6 (42.1)	12.3 (54.1)	16.3 (61.3)	12.9 (55.2)	8.6 (47.5)	1.2 (34.2)	−7.2 (19.0)	−9.6 (14.7)	−10.9 (12.4)
Average precipitation mm (inches)	9.0 (0.35)	14.5 (0.57)	27.6 (1.09)	34.7 (1.37)	56.6 (2.23)	59.2 (2.33)	127.3 (5.01)	113.2 (4.46)	94.1 (3.70)	43.1 (1.70)	27.6 (1.09)	8.2 (0.32)	615.1 (24.22)
Average precipitation days (≥ 0.1 mm)	4.1	4.4	6.0	6.1	7.7	7.8	11.2	10.8	9.9	7.0	5.3	3.6	83.9
Average snowy days	4.3	3.4	1.5	0.2	0	0	0	0	0	0	1.2	3.7	14.3
Average relative humidity (%)	53	56	58	58	61	62	76	79	76	69	62	55	64
Mean monthly sunshine hours	137.4	132.6	166.0	189.3	199.2	191.7	152.1	143.6	138.2	147.5	140.0	137.1	1,874.7
Percentage possible sunshine	44	43	44	48	46	44	35	35	38	43	46	45	43
Source: China Meteorological Administrationall-time February high

== Notable people ==
- Liang Jun (梁 軍) - teacher and activist
