= James J. Y. Liu =

American writer

James J.Y. Liu
- 劉若愚
- Born: 1926; Beijing, China
- Died: 26 May 1986 (aged 59–60)
- Education: Fu Jen Catholic University; University of Bristol
- Scientific career
- Fields: Chinese literature
- Workplaces: Stanford University; University of London; University of Hong Kong; University of Hawaii; University of Pittsburgh

James J.Y. Liu (Chinese: 劉若愚, 1926 – 26 May 1986) was an expert in Chinese literature research and Chinese literary theorists.

== Biography ==
Liu graduated from the Department of Western Languages at Fu Jen Catholic University in 1948, and received a master's degree from the University of Bristol in 1952.

He taught Chinese and English literature at the University of London, University of Hong Kong, University of Hawaii, and the University of Pittsburgh. In 1967, he served as professor of Chinese literature at Stanford University. His main research was in the fields of Chinese classical poetry, poetry and literary theory, as well as Chinese and Western comparative literature and comparative poetics.
