= Canglang Shihua =

Chinese book written by Yan Yu

The Canglang Shihua (traditional Chinese: 滄浪詩話; simplified Chinese: 沧浪诗话) is a Chinese book of poetic criticism compiled in the Southern Song dynasty. It was written by Yan Yu, and its title, which translates as "Canglang Poetry Talks", derives from his art name, Canglang Buke (滄浪逋客).

== Author and date ==
The Canglang Shihua was written by Yan Yu. According to the 1268 preface written by Huang Gongshao (黄公紹), it was written in the 1230s.

== Contents ==
The work consists of five parts:

- Shibian (詩弁/诗弁)
- Shiti (詩體/诗体)
- Shifa (詩法/诗法)
- Shiping (詩評/诗评)
- Kaozheng (考証/考证)

This orderly layout is unique among Song poetic works.

== Works cited ==
- Yokoyama, Iseo (1994). "Canglang Shihua (Sōrō Shiwa in Japanese)". Encyclopedia Nipponica (in Japanese). Shogakukan.
