= Yan Yu (poetry theorist) =

Yan Yu (Chinese: 严羽; 1191–1241) was a Chinese poetry theorist and poet of the southern Song Dynasty. He was born in Shaowu and was active during the reign of Lizong. Yan never became an officer all through his life, and he spent most of his lifetime at home. But he was very concerned about national affairs, and wrote many poems to impugn those affairs of state. He was most famous for his poetic theory book Canglang Shihua (《沧浪诗话》), in which he first proposed that High Tang poetry be taken as the model for all poetry.

== See also ==
- Classical Chinese poetry
- Gao Bing
