= Li Shangyin =

Chinese poet and politician

- 李商隱
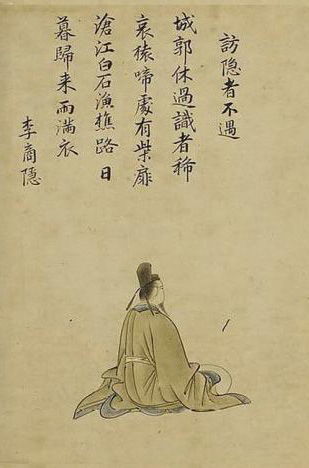
- Born: c. 813
- Died: c. 858
- Occupations: Poet, politician

Chinese name
- Traditional Chinese: 李商隱
- Simplified Chinese: 李商隐
Transcriptions
Standard Mandarin
- Hanyu Pinyin: Lǐ Shāngyǐn
- Wade–Giles: Li^{3} Shang^{1}-yin^{3}
- IPA: [lì ʂáŋ.ìn]
Yue: Cantonese
- Jyutping: Lei^{5} Soeng^{1}-jan^{2}
- IPA: [lej˩˧ sœŋ˥ jɐn˧˥]
Middle Chinese
- Middle Chinese: Ljɨ^{B} Śjang-Ɂjən^{B}

Japanese name
- Kanji: 李商隠
- Hiragana: り しょういん
Transcriptions
- Romanization: Ri Shō-in

Li Shangyin (Chinese: 李商隱; pinyin: Lǐ Shāngyǐn, c. 813–858), courtesy name Yishan (Chinese: 義山), was a Chinese poet and politician of the late Tang dynasty, born in the Henei Commandery (now Qinyang, Henan). He is noted for his imagist and "no-title" (Chinese: 無題; pinyin: wútí) poetic style. Li has been frequently anthologized, and many of his poems have been translated into various languages, including several collections in English.

== Biography ==
Li Shangyin was born in 812 or 813 CE. The exact date is uncertain. His career was rough, and he never obtained a high-ranking position, because of either factional disputes or his association with Liu Fen (劉蕡), a prominent opponent of the eunuchs.

== Historical background ==
Li lived at a time when the Tang dynasty was rapidly declining, after 200 years of prosperity.

Culturally, politically, and economically, the Tang was one of the greatest periods in Chinese history. The cosmopolitan capital of Chang'an was filled with traders from the Middle East and other parts of Asia where many Asian vassal states sent envoys to pay tribute. The empire covered a vast territory, the largest yet in Chinese history. Under the reign of Emperors Gaozuyi through Taizong, Empress Wu, and Emperor Xuanzong, the Tang empire steadily grew to the height of its prosperity.

But after the An Lushan Rebellion, the country's political and economic structure began to disintegrate. The rebel generals fighting against the Tang court during and after the rebellion were allowed to surrender and given military governor posts, even after the rebellion's leaders were vanquished. Peace and stability over the entire area of Hebei was heavily bought by a compromise settlement. These provincial governors paid only lip service to the central government. The court, now weak and impotent, tolerated their growing independence, wary also of the aggression of the Tibetans toward the northwest who posed a constant threat to the capital.

During the subsequent years, military governors repeatedly challenged imperial authority with attempts to claim hereditary succession, resulting in revolts and bloodshed. Apart from this loss of control over the provincial military leaders and other problems at the frontiers, the Tang court was internally plagued by the increasingly powerful eunuchs and the fierce Niu–Li factional strife.

=== Rise of the eunuchs ===
The eunuchs first gained political influence as a group when Gao Lishi helped Emperor Xuanzong rise to power. Later, Li Fuguo also helped put Emperor Suzong on the throne. By gaining royal patronage, eunuchs gradually controlled personal access to the emperors and participated in the business of the central government. They also involved themselves with provincial appointments, at times even intervening with armed forces in disputes over imperial successions. By the time of Li Shangyin, the emperors had allowed the eunuchs to become fully entrenched both militarily and politically. After Xuanzong, all Tang emperors (except Jingzong) were put on the throne by the eunuchs.

=== Sweet Dew Incident ===
In 835 the infamous "Sweet Dew Incident" occurred during the reign of Emperor Wenzong. A palace coup, designed by Li Xun (the prime minister) and Zheng Zhu (the military governor of Fengxiang) in support of Wenzong's effort to overthrow the eunuchs, failed. The eunuchs, led by Qiu Shiliang, slaughtered the clans of many high officials and chief ministers. Many other innocent people were killed in connection with this event. The eunuchs, whose power had been growing out of control, now completely dominated the Emperor and the affairs of state.

=== Niu-Li factional strife ===
The Niu-Li factional strife was another destructive internal force haunting the Tang court. The Niu and Li factions were not organized political parties, but two groups of rival politicians, hostile toward each other as a result of personal animosity. The Niu faction was represented by Niu Sengru and Li Zongmin and the Li faction by Li Deyu. In the 830s the two contending factions created much turmoil in court through the reigns of Emperors Muzong, Jingzong, Wenzong, Wuzong, and Xuanzong, a period coinciding almost exactly with Li Shangyin's life. According to Chen Yinke, the struggle was also due to a difference in social background between the two groups, one representing the traditional ruling class of North China and the other the newly risen class of scholar-officials who reached their positions through the civil service examinations. In any case, many intellectuals and high officials were involved in this struggle. When members of one faction were in power, people associated with the other would be demoted, or out of favor. The factional strife kept court officials from uniting against the increasing power of the eunuchs.

=== Decline of the eunuchs ===
The emperors, rendered completely helpless, tried to play one force against another. It was 50 years after Li Shangyin's death that the eunuchs were finally eradicated with the help of the military governors, precipitating the Tang dynasty's downfall. The 45 years of Li Shangyin's life spanned the reign of six emperors. Among them, Xianzong and Jingzong were murdered by the eunuchs. Muzong, Wuzong, and Xuanzong indulged in escapist practices; Wuzong, for example, died of an overdose of elixir drugs.

== Poetry ==
Li Shangyin is well known for his poetry. In the many published editions of the poetry anthology Three Hundred Tang Poems, the number of his poems ranks below only Du Fu, Li Bai, and Wang Wei. Li's poetry is distinguished from mainstream Classical Chinese poetry by his extensive use of love as a major theme as well as the unconventional decision to leave many collected verses untitled.

Li was a typical Late Tang poet: his works were sensuous, dense and allusive. The latter quality made adequate translation extremely difficult. The political, biographical, or philosophical implications contained in some of his poems have been a subject of debate for many centuries in China.

=== Poetic style ===
Li's poetry takes various Classical Chinese poetry forms. The Chinese critical tradition tends to depict Li as the Tang dynasty's last great poet. The Tang dynasty ended in 907 CE and, after a period of disunity, was succeeded by the Song dynasty in 960 CE. The Song poetry style, although drawing on traditional forms, is especially noted for the development of the ci (Wade-Giles: t'zu) form, which was characterized by providing fresh lyrics to fixed-meter tunes. Li Shangyin's poetry played an important transitional role as part of this developmental process. James J. Y. Liu, who shared the first comprehensive collection of English translations of Li's poetry, described him as "one of the most ambiguous if not the most ambiguous poets."

=== The Brocade Zither (Chin-se, 錦瑟) ===
Li's most famous and cryptic poem is arguably "Jin Se", or "Chin-se" (錦瑟) ("The Brocade Zither", also translated as "The Ornamented Zither" or "The Exquisite Zither") (the title is taken from the first two characters of the first verse, as this is one of Li's "no title" poems) (original text and translation seen below), consisting of 56 characters and a string of images.

James J. Y. Liu noted that there were five major interpretations of what Li intended to convey, including frustration about his career trajectory and commemoration of his deceased wife, among others.

=== Derangements of My Contemporaries (Za Zuan, 雜纂) ===
Derangements of My Contemporaries (Za Zuan, 雜纂, or "random compilations") was not viewed as poetry nor prose in Li's lifetime, but some scholars considered it a precedent for The Pillow Book authored by Sei Shōnagon, and believed that it offered a peak into the Tang dynasty beyond its classic image of a cultural "golden age".

Chloe Garcia Roberts translated it in 2013 with a grant from PEN America. The volume was published in 2014 with New Directions. Lucas Klein of Arizona State University, another key translator of Li's poetry, described Roberts' work as a "small rebirth of the poetic vanguard of Chinese poetry translation" in a 2016 Los Angeles Review of Books essay titled Tribunals of Erudition and Taste: or, Why Translations of Premodern Chinese Poetry Are Having a Moment Right Now.

== Selected poems ==
The Brocade Zither (Chin-se, 錦瑟)

錦瑟無端五十弦，
一弦一柱思華年。
莊生曉夢迷蝴蝶，
望帝春心托杜鵑。
滄海月明珠有淚，
藍田日暖玉生煙。
此情可待成追憶，
只是當時已惘然。

Translation:

It just happens that the brocade zither has fifty strings,
Each string, each peg turns thoughts to the flowering years.
Zhuang Zhou’s morning dream lost in a butterfly,
Emperor Wang’s spring heart lodged in a cuckoo.
When the moon grows bright on the gray sea, there are tears in pearl.
When the sun warms Indigo Fields, the jade gives off a mist.
One could wait until these feelings become remembrance,
It’s just that at the moment I was already in a daze.

—Translated by Stephen Owen in The Late Tang: Chinese Poetry of the Mid-Ninth Century (827–860)

I wonder why this splendid zither has fifty strings
Every string, every peg evokes those glorious springs
Perplexed as the sage, waking from his butterfly dream
Like the king, entrust to the cuckoo my heart evergreen
The moon bathes the teardrop pearl in the blue sea
The sun lights the radiant jade in indigo mountain
These feelings remain a cherished memory
But I was already lost at that moment

—Alternate translation by Lien W.S. and Foo C.W. in Tang Poems Revisited, and as cited by Maja Lavrač of the University of Ljubljana in Li Shangyin and the Art of Poetic Ambiguity.

Falling Petals (Luo-hua, 落花)

高閣客竟去， 小園花亂飛。
參差連曲陌， 迢遞送斜暉。
腸斷未忍掃， 眼穿仍欲歸。
芳心向春盡， 所得是沾衣。

Gone is the guest from the Chamber of Rank,
And petals, confused in my little garden,
Zigzagging down my crooked path,
Escort like dancers the setting sun.
Oh, how can I bear to sweep them away?
To a sad-eyed watcher they never return.
Heart's fragrance is spent with the ending of spring
And nothing left but a tear-stained robe.

— Translated by Witter Bynner, in Tang Shi San Bai Shou (300 Tang Poems)

Untitled (Wu-ti, 無題)

相见时难别亦难，东风无力百花残。
春蚕到死丝方尽，蜡炬成灰泪始干。
晓镜但愁云鬓改，夜吟应觉月光寒。
蓬山此去无多路，青鸟殷勤为探看。

Time was long before I met her, but is longer since we parted,
And the east wind has arisen and a hundred flowers are gone,
And the silk-worms of spring will weave until they die
And every night the candles will weep their wicks away.
Mornings in her mirror she sees her hair-cloud changing,
Yet she dares the chill of moonlight with her evening song.
...It is not so very far to her Enchanted Mountain
O blue-birds, be listening! Bring me what she says!

— Translated by Witter Bynner, in Tang Shi San Bai Shou (300 Tang Poems)

== In popular culture ==
More recently, Li Shangyin's poem "When Will I Be Home?" is alluded to and quoted from by the protagonist of Peter Heller's 2012 novel, The Dog Stars. The novel ends with a reprinting of the poem in full.

His name is mentioned, and one of his poems is quoted, in Episode 119 of the Korean TV series 구암 허준.

== See also ==
- Li Yishan wenji
