= List of common misconceptions about arts and culture =

Each entry on this list of common misconceptions is worded as a correction; the misconceptions themselves are implied rather than stated. These entries are concise summaries; the main subject articles can be consulted for more detail.

== Business ==
- Federal legal tender laws in the United States do not require that private businesses, persons, or organizations accept cash for payment, though it must be treated as valid payment for debts when tendered to a creditor.
- Adidas is not an acronym for "All day I dream about sports", "All day I dream about soccer", or "All day I dream about sex". The company was named after its founder Adolf "Adi" Dassler in 1949. The earliest publication found of the latter backronym was in 1978, as a joke.
- The letters "AR" in AR-15 stand for "ArmaLite Rifle", reflecting the company ArmaLite that originally manufactured the weapon. They do not stand for "assault rifle".

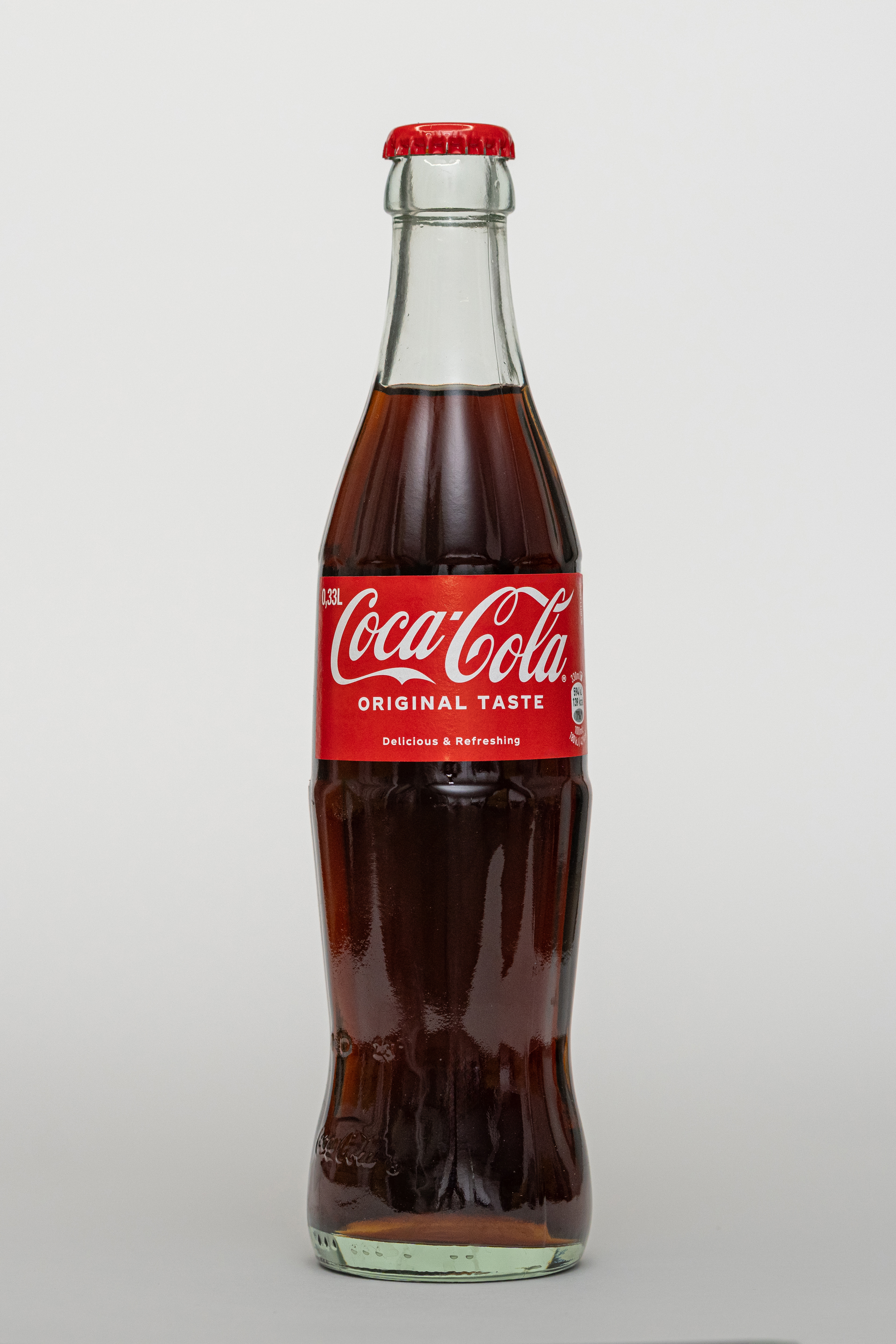
A Coca-Cola bottle

- The Coca-Cola bottle's contour bottle was not designed by the industrial designer Raymond Loewy.
- The common image of Santa Claus (Father Christmas) as a large jolly man in red garments was not created by the Coca-Cola Company as an advertising tool. Santa Claus had already taken this form in American popular culture by the late 19th century, long before Coca-Cola used his image in the 1930s.
- The Chevrolet Nova sold well in Latin American markets; General Motors did not rename the car. While no va does mean "doesn't go" in Spanish, nova was easily understood to mean "new".
- Netflix was not founded after its co-founder Reed Hastings was charged a $40 late fee by Blockbuster. Hastings made the story up to summarize Netflix's value proposition; Netflix's founders were actually inspired by Amazon.
- PepsiCo in no real sense ever owned the "6th most powerful navy" in the world after a deal with the Soviet Union. In 1989, Pepsi acquired several decommissioned warships as part of a barter deal. The oil tankers were leased out or sold and the other ships sold for scrap. A follow-on deal involved another 10 ships.

== Fine arts ==
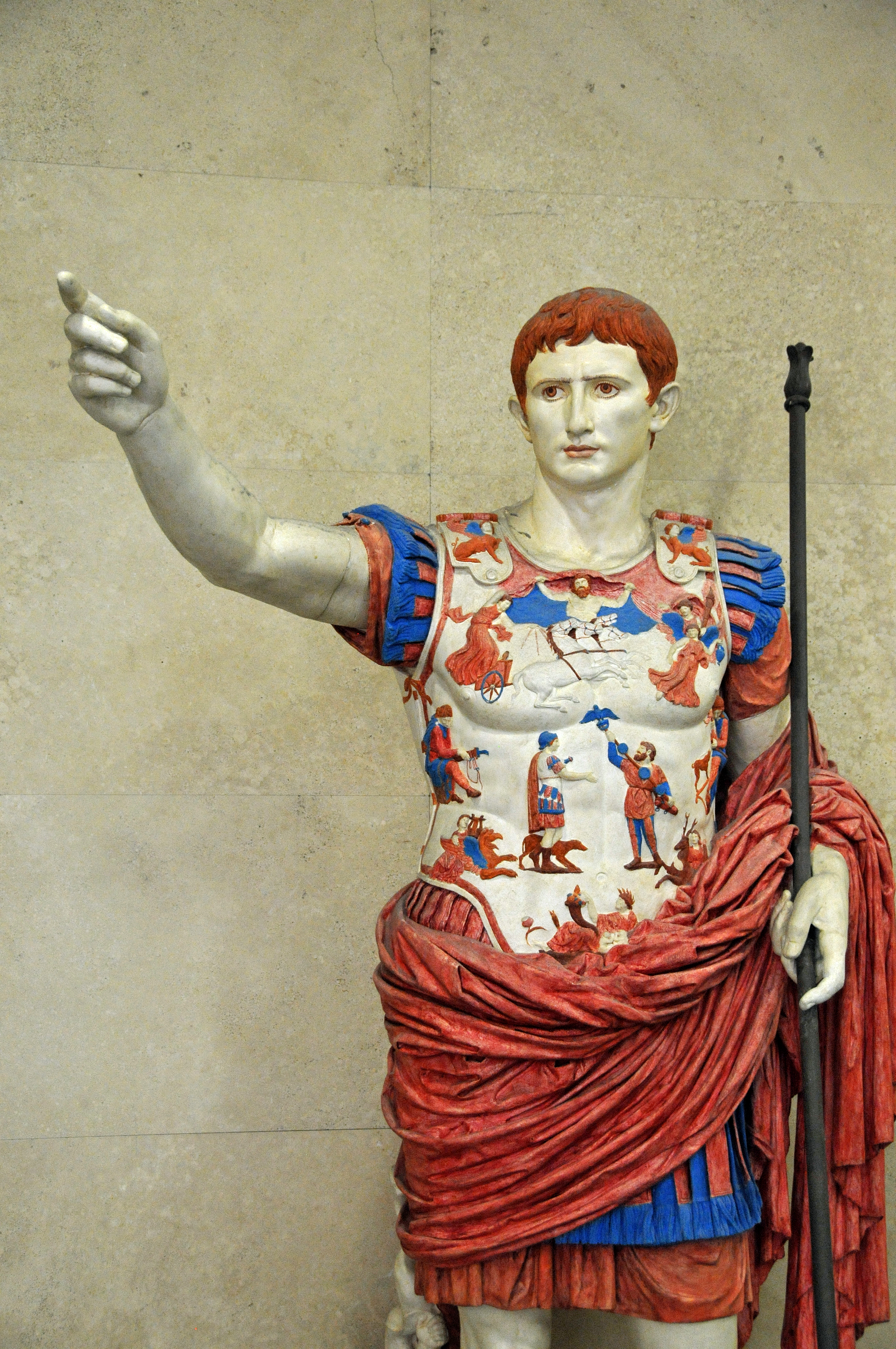
Classical sculptures were originally painted in colors.

- Ancient Greek and Roman sculptures were originally painted in colors; they appear white today only because the original pigments have deteriorated. Some well-preserved statues still bear traces of their original coloration.
- Michelangelo was standing, not lying down, while painting the ceiling of the Sistine Chapel.

== Food and cooking ==
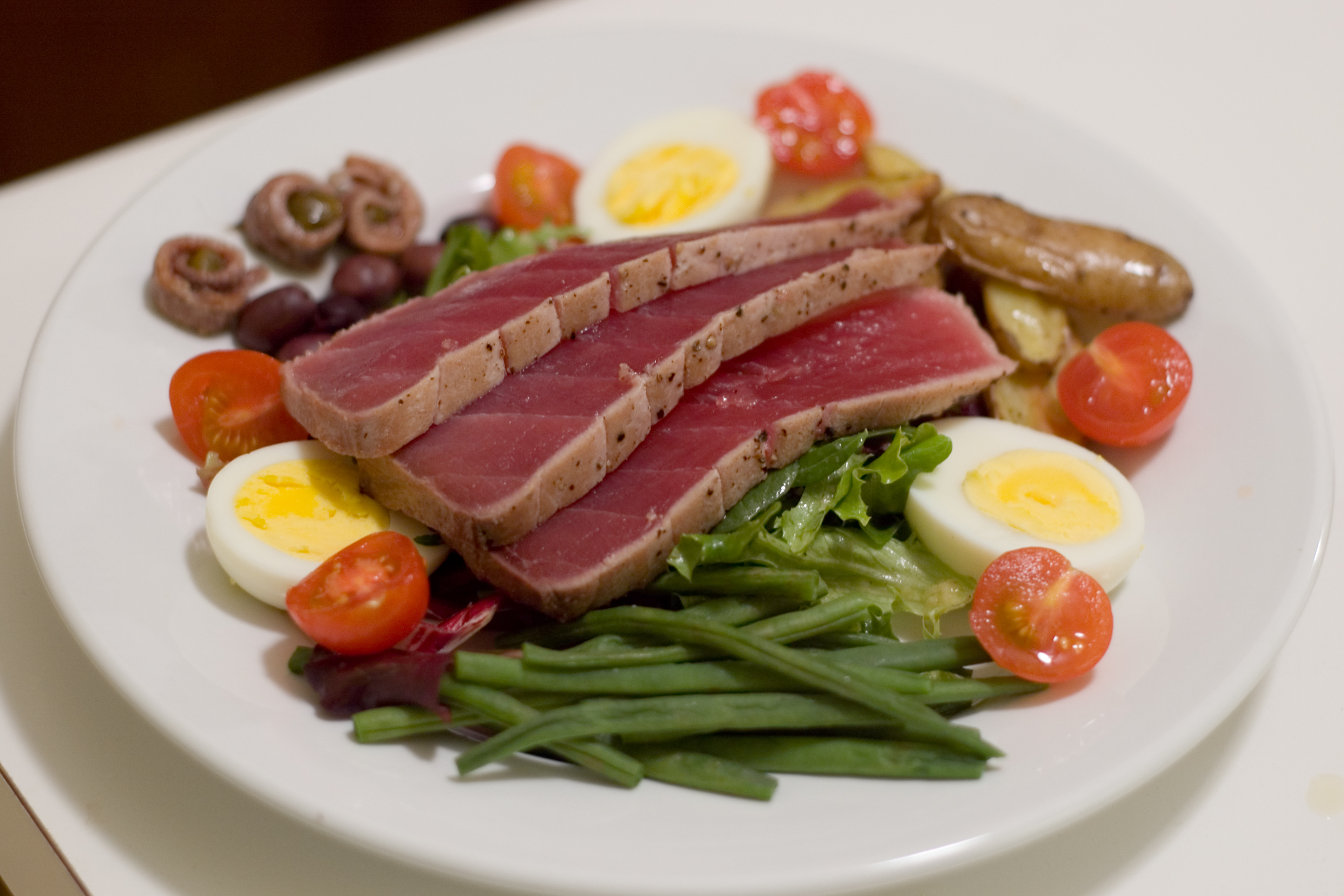
Seared tuna

- Searing does not seal in moisture in meat; it causes it to lose some moisture. Meat is seared to brown it and to affect its color, flavor, and texture.
- Braising meat does not add moisture; it causes it to lose some moisture. Moisture appears to be added when the gentle cooking breaks down connective tissue and collagen, which lubricates and tenderizes fibers.
- Mussels and clams that do not open when cooked can still be fully cooked and safe to eat.
- Twinkies, an American snack cake generally considered to be "junk food", have a shelf life of around 25 days, despite the (usually facetious) common claim that they remain edible for decades. The official shelf life is 45 days and they normally remain on a store shelf for 7 to 10 days.
- Packaged foods, when properly stored, can safely be eaten past their "expiration" dates in the US. While some US states regulate expiration dates for some products, and federal law requires them for infant formula, generally "use-by" and "best-by" dates are manufacturer suggestions for best quality.
- Storing bread in the refrigerator makes it go stale faster than leaving it at room temperature. It does, however, slow mold growth.

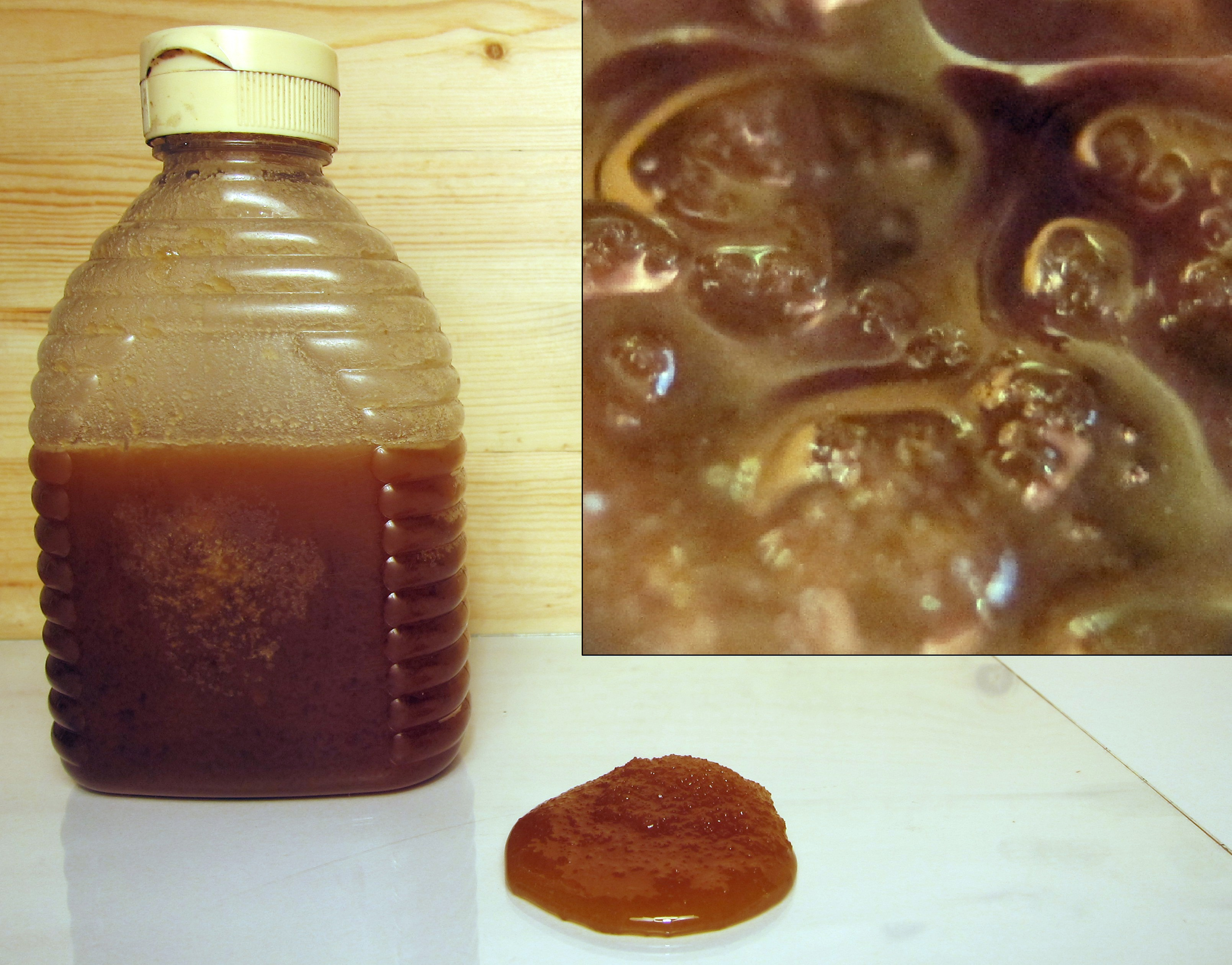
Crystallized honey

- Crystallized honey is not spoiled. The crystals are formed by low temperature crystallization, a high glucose level, and the presence of pollen. The crystallization can be reversed by gentle heating.
- Seeds are not the spiciest part of chili peppers. Seeds contain a low amount of capsaicin, one of the compounds which induce the hot sensation (pungency)—. The highest concentration of capsaicin is located in the placental tissue (the pith) to which the seeds are attached.
- Turkey meat is not particularly high in tryptophan, and does not cause more drowsiness than other foods. Drowsiness after large meals such as Christmas or Thanksgiving dinner generally comes from overeating.
- Darker roasts of coffee do not always contain more caffeine than lighter roasts. When coffee is roasted, it expands. When the roasted coffee is ground and measured volumetrically, the denser lighter roasts have more coffee, and thus caffeine, per cup.
- Bourbon whiskey does not have to be distilled in Kentucky. Bourbon is also distilled in states such as New York, California, Wyoming and Washington, as the legal requirement is only that it be made in the US. However, Kentucky does produce the majority of bourbon.
- Using mild soap on well-seasoned cast-iron cookware will not damage the seasoning.

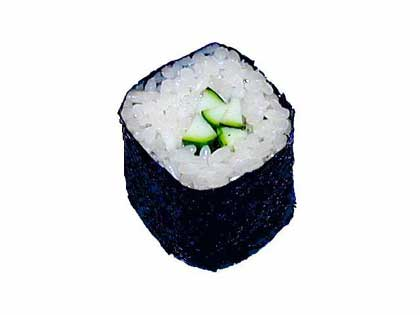
Kappa-maki contains cucumber and no fish

- Although most sushi contains some form of seafood, the term does not mean 'raw fish', as it refers to the vinegar-prepared rice the dish contains, nor is fish a defining ingredient of sushi. Some sushi, such as kappamaki, contain no fish.
- Allspice is not a mix of spices. It is a single spice—sourced from the Caribbean tree Pimenta dioica, also known as pimenta, pimento, and Jamaican pepper in various places around the world—so called because it seems to combine the flavours and scents of many spices, especially cinnamon, nutmeg, cloves and black pepper.
- Monosodium glutamate (MSG) has not been found to cause headaches and other feelings of discomfort, known as "Chinese restaurant syndrome" in placebo-controlled trials. Although there are reports of MSG sensitivity among a subset of the population, this has not been demonstrated in trials.

=== Food and drink history ===
- Steak tartare was not invented by Mongol warriors who tenderized horse meat under their saddles. It is likely named after the French tartar sauce, evolving from an early 20th century French dish where the sauce was served with steaks.
- Marco Polo did not introduce pasta to Italy from China. The misconception originated as promotional material in the Macaroni Journal, a newsletter published by an association of American pasta makers.
- Spices were not used in the Middle Ages to mask the flavor of rotten meat before refrigeration. Spices were an expensive luxury item; those who could afford them could afford good meat, and no contemporaneous documents call for using spices to disguise the taste of bad meat.
- Catherine de' Medici's cooks did not introduce Italian foods and techniques to the French royal court, laying the foundations for the development of French haute cuisine.
- Whipped cream (crème Chantilly) was not invented by François Vatel in 1661 and later named at the Château de Chantilly where it was served; similar recipes are attested a century earlier in Italy and France.
- Dom Pérignon did not invent champagne. Wine naturally starts to bubble after being pressed, and bubbles at the time were considered a flaw which Pérignon worked unsuccessfully to eliminate.
- Potato chips (also known as potato crisps) were not invented by a frustrated chef in response to a customer who complained that his French fries were too thick and not salty enough. Recipes for potato chips were published as early as 1817. The misconception was popularized by a 1973 advertising campaign by the St. Regis Paper Company.
- George Washington Carver was not the inventor of peanut butter. The first peanut butter related patent was filed by John Harvey Kellogg in 1895, and peanut butter was used by the Incas centuries prior to that. Carver did compile hundreds of uses for peanuts, in addition to uses for pecans and sweet potatoes. An opinion piece by William F. Buckley Jr. may have been the source of the misconception.

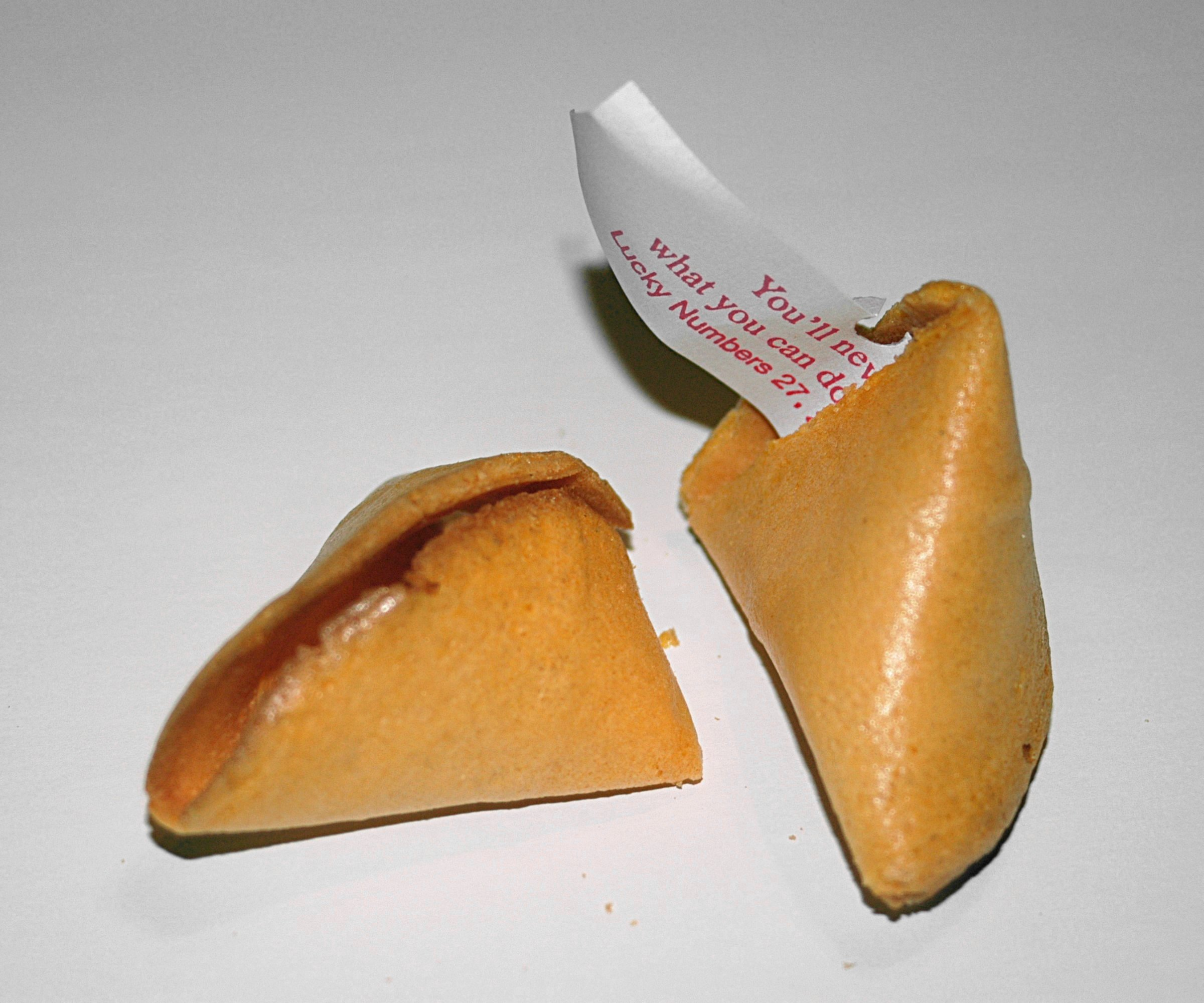
Fortune cookies are rarely found in China

- Fortune cookies are not authentically part of Chinese cuisine, despite their ubiquity in Chinese restaurants in the United States and other Western countries. They originated in Japan and were introduced to the US by the Japanese. In China, they are considered American, and are rare.
- Julius Caesar did not invent Caesar salad. Its creator was Caesar Cardini, an Italian-American restaurateur, in Tijuana, Mexico, in 1924.
- Hydrox is not a knock-off of Oreos. Hydrox, invented in 1908, predates Oreos by four years and was initially more popular than Oreos. The name "Hydrox" being said to sound like a laundry detergent contributed to its market decline.
- The difference between the taste of "banana-flavored" candy and a real banana is not due to the former being specifically designed to replicate the taste of Gros Michel bananas, the cultivar that dominated the American banana market before the rise of Cavendish bananas. All banana cultivars derive their flavor from a complex mix of many compounds, while a single compound, isoamyl acetate, gives banana candy its flavor. Isoamyl acetate naturally occurs in bananas as well as many other fruits and fermented beverages. It is more concentrated in Gros Michel bananas than in Cavendish bananas, but its use in candy production was due to its simple production, not any specific resemblance to a banana's flavor.
- Neither Mongolian beef nor Mongolian barbeque, which are Chinese dishes, have anything to do with Mongolian cuisine nor were they even inspired by it. They were conceived in Taiwan in the 1950s and were originally going to be named after Beijing, the hometown of its creator, but this choice was avoided due to the association of Beijing with Communism. The name Mongolia was chosen for its exoticism.
- There were never any laws, regulations, or contracts forbidding serving lobster to prisoners or servants in colonial New England more than twice a week, although it was cheap and abundant, serving as poor people's food.
- The belief that tomatoes were poisonous was not widespread in the United States in the early 19th century, and no one had to publicly eat a tomato to demonstrate that it was not poisonous. The apocryphal story of someone doing this dates from the 20th century.

=== Microwave ovens ===
- Microwave ovens are not tuned to any specific resonant frequency for water molecules in the food. They cook food via dielectric heating of polar molecules, including water.
- Microwave ovens do not cook food from the inside out. 2.45 GHz microwaves can only penetrate approximately 1–1.5 inches (2.5–3.8 centimeters) into most foods. The inside portions of thicker foods are mainly heated by heat conducted from the outer layers.
- The radiation produced by a microwave oven is non-ionizing, similar to visible light or radio waves. It therefore does not have the cancer risks associated with ionizing radiation such as X-rays and high-energy particles, nor does it render the food radioactive. All microwave radiation dissipates as heat. Long-term rodent studies to assess cancer risk have so far failed to identify any carcinogenicity from 2.45 GHz microwave radiation even with chronic exposure levels (i.e. large fraction of life span) far larger than humans are likely to encounter from any leaking ovens. The risk of injury from direct exposure to microwaves is not cumulative, but instead the result of a high-intensity exposure resulting in tissue burns, in much the same way that a high-intensity laser can burn.
- Microwaving food does not significantly reduce its nutritive value more than other ways of heating and may preserve it better than other cooking processes due to shorter cooking times.

== Film and television ==
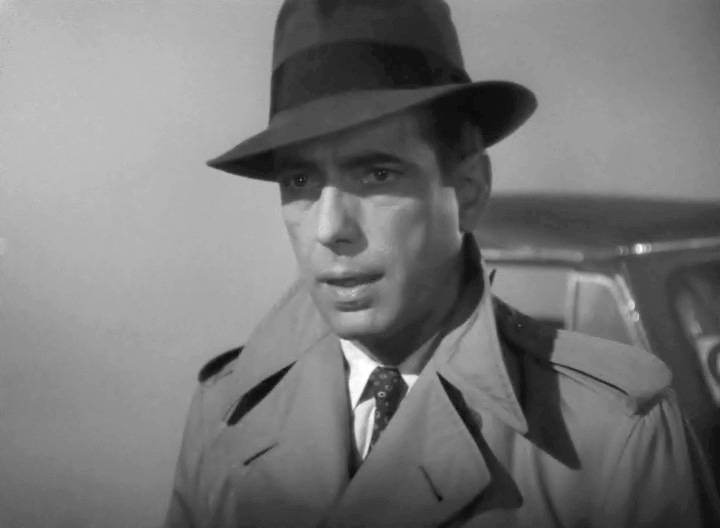
Humphrey Bogart in Casablanca

- Ronald Reagan was never seriously considered for the role of Rick Blaine in the 1942 film Casablanca, eventually played by Humphrey Bogart. An early studio press release mentioned Reagan, but the studio already knew that Reagan was unavailable because of his upcoming military service. Indeed, the producer had always wanted Bogart for the part.
- Walt Disney Studios' Snow White and the Seven Dwarfs was not the first animated film to be feature-length. El Apóstol, a lost 1917 Argentine silent film that used cutout animation, is considered the first. The Adventures of Prince Achmed, a German film from 1926 also using the cutout technique, is the oldest animated feature that survives. The misconception comes from Snow White and the Seven Dwarfs being the first feature-length film to be animated on cels.
- The 1939 film The Wizard of Oz was not the first film in color. Kinemacolor was used starting in 1902, and the first Technicolor process debuted in 1917.
- A 1990s film titled Shazaam starring American comedian and actor Sinbad as a genie has never existed. False memories of this film are often cited as an example of the Mandela effect, and are commonly attributed to the 1996 film Kazaam, which featured basketball player Shaquille O'Neal as the titular genie, along with Sinbad's appearance wearing a genie costume while introducing the 1977 film Sinbad and the Eye of the Tiger on TNT in 1994.

== Language ==
Chinese word for "crisis"

- The Chinese word for "crisis" (危機) is not composed of the symbols for "danger" and "opportunity"; the first does represent danger, but the second instead means "inflection point" (the original meaning of the word "crisis").
- The pronunciation of coronal fricatives in Spanish did not arise through imitation of a lisping king. Only one Spanish king, Peter of Castile, is documented as having a lisp, and the current pronunciation originated two centuries after his death.
- Sign languages are not the same worldwide. Aside from the pidgin International Sign, each country generally has its own native sign language, and some have more than one.
- The word "gringo" did not originate during the Mexican–American War (1846–1848) as a corruption of "Green, go home!", in reference to the green uniforms of American troops. The word originally simply meant "foreigner", and is probably a corruption of the Spanish word griego for "Greek" (along the lines of the idiom "It's Greek to me").
- The Guugu Yimithirr word gangurru, which is the basis for the English word "kangaroo," is not a misinterpretation by James Cook of a word meaning "I don't know." Instead, it refers to eastern grey kangaroos.
- There is no known equivalent in the Chinese language for the so-called "Chinese curse", "May you live in interesting times." The nearest related Chinese expression translates as "Better to be a dog in times of tranquility than a human in times of chaos." (寧為太平犬，不做亂世人), which originates from Volume 3 of the 1627 short story collection by Feng Menglong, Stories to Awaken the World.

=== English language ===
- Irregardless is a word. It appears in numerous dictionaries along with other nonstandard, slang, or colloquial terms.
- It is permissible to end a sentence with a preposition. The supposed rule against it originated in an attempt to imitate Latin, but modern linguists agree that it is a natural and organic part of the English language. Similarly, modern style and usage manuals allow split infinitives.
- African American Vernacular English speakers do not simply replace "is" with "be" across all tenses, with no added meaning. AAVE speakers use "be" to mark a habitual grammatical aspect not explicitly distinguished in Standard English.
- "420" did not originate from the Los Angeles police or penal code for marijuana use. California Penal Code section 420 prohibits the obstruction of access to public land. The use of "420" started in 1971 at San Rafael High School, where a group of students would go to smoke at 4:20 pm.
- Xmas did not originate as a secular plan to "take Christ out of Christmas". X represents the Greek letter chi, the first letter of Χριστός (Christós), "Christ" in Greek, as found in the chi-rho symbol (ΧΡ) since the 4th century. In English, "X" was first used as a scribal abbreviation for "Christ" in 1021.
- The word crap did not originate as a back-formation of British plumber Thomas Crapper's apt surname. The word crap ultimately comes from Medieval Latin crappa.
- The word fuck did not originate in the Middle Ages as an acronym. Proposed acronyms include "fornicating under consent of king" or "for unlawful carnal knowledge", purportedly used as a sign posted above adulterers in the stocks. Nor did it originate as a corruption of "pluck yew" (an idiom falsely attributed to the English for drawing a longbow). It is most likely derived from Middle Dutch or other Germanic languages, where it either meant "to thrust" or "to copulate with" (fokken in Middle Dutch), "to copulate", or "to strike, push, copulate" or "penis".
- The expression "rule of thumb" did not originate from an English law allowing a man to beat his wife with a stick no thicker than his thumb, and there is no evidence that such a law ever existed. The expression originates from the late seventeenth century from various trades where quantities were measured by comparison to the width or length of a thumb.
- The term "blue laws", denoting laws banning certain activities on specific days, did not originate from such laws being originally written on blue paper.
- The word the was never pronounced or spelled "ye" in Old or Middle English. The confusion, seen in the common stock phrase "ye olde", derives from the use of the character thorn (þ), which in Middle English represented the sound now represented in Modern English by "th". This evolved as early printing presses replaced the word the with "yͤ", a "y" character with a superscript "e".
- The anti-Italian slur wop did not originate from an acronym for "without papers" or "without passport"; it is actually derived from the term guappo (roughly meaning thug), from the Spanish guapo.

== Law, crime, and military ==
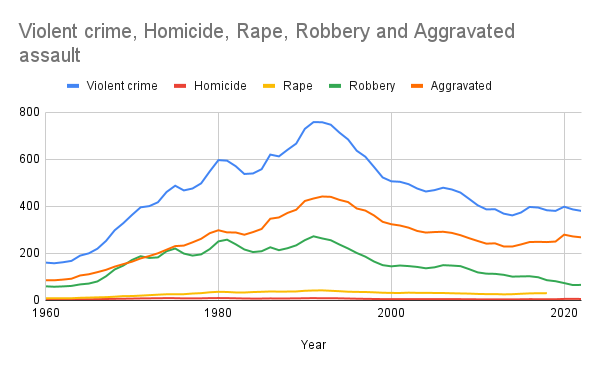
Violent crime rates in the United States declined between 1991 and 2022.

- Crime rates are declining for most types of crime, beginning in the mid to late 1980s and early 1990s. In Europe, crime statistics show this is part of a broader pattern of crime decline since the late Middle Ages, with a reversal from the 1960s to the 1980s and 1990s, before the decline continued. In the United States, between 1993 and 2022, the rate of violent crime per 100,000 people fell by almost 50%, and the rate of property crime fell by more than half. The number of gun homicides also decreased.
- Studies consistently find that corporal punishment may have the opposite of its intended effect in the long run, decreasing long-term obedience, while increasing the chances of aggressive behavior, depression, anxiety, suicide, and physical abuse. See also Alternatives to spanking.
- Chewing gum is not punishable by caning in Singapore. Although importing and selling chewing gum has been illegal in Singapore since 1992, and corporal punishment is still an applicable penalty for certain offenses in the country, the two facts are unrelated; chewing gum-related offenses have always been only subject to fines and incarceration, and the possession or consumption of chewing gum itself is not illegal.
- Employees of the international police organization Interpol cannot conduct investigations, use fake passports or arrest criminals. However, Interpol does issue travel documents to its officials in some circumstances. Interpol's role is facilitating international communication between law enforcement agencies of sovereign states.
- No cases have been proven of strangers killing or severely injuring children by intentionally hiding poisons or sharp objects such as razor blades in candy or apples during Halloween trick-or-treating. In one case, adult family members spread this story to cover up filicide.
- There are no documented cases of pet black cats being tortured or ritually sacrificed around Halloween. Where violent deaths of black cats have been documented around Halloween, it was caused by natural predators such as coyotes, eagles, or raptors.
- It is not necessary to wait 24 hours before filing a missing person report. When there is evidence of violence or of an unusual absence, it is important to start an investigation promptly. Criminology experts say the first 72 hours in a missing person investigation are the most critical.
- Perry Mason moments, where a surprising revelation during a trial exonerates the accused, are rare, despite their ubiquity in legal drama. The vast majority of evidence, both documentary and testimonial, is exchanged in pretrial discovery; should new information come to light, the trial is usually stayed until both sides can review it.
- Diplomatic missions do not necessarily enjoy full extraterritorial status and are generally not sovereign territory of the represented state. The sending state gives embassies sovereign status only in a minority of countries. Although they receive special privileges (such as immunity from most local laws) by the Vienna Convention on Diplomatic Relations, the premises of an embassy remain under the jurisdiction of the host state.

=== United States ===
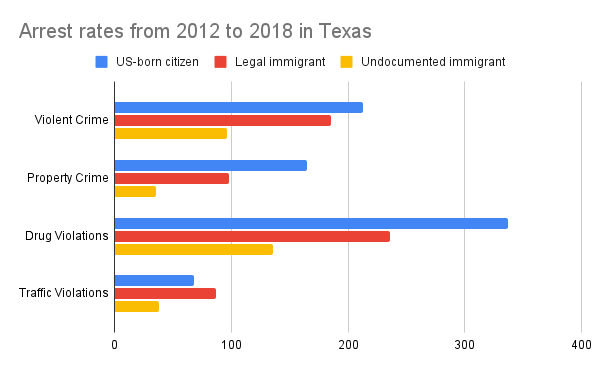
Immigrants had lower arrest rates than citizens in Texas, 2012–2018

- Undocumented immigrants in the US have substantially lower crime rates than US-born citizens. Compared to undocumented immigrants, US-born citizens are more than twice as likely to be arrested for violent crimes, 2.5 times more likely to be arrested for drug crimes, and over 4 times more likely to be arrested for property crimes. Immigrants are 60% less likely to be incarcerated than US-born citizens.
- The First Amendment to the United States Constitution generally prevents only government restrictions on the freedoms of religion, speech, press, assembly, or petition, not restrictions imposed by other entities unless they are acting on behalf of the government. Other laws may limit the ability of private businesses and individuals to restrict the speech of others.
- In the United States, a defendant may not have their case dismissed simply because they were not read their Miranda rights at the time of their arrest. If a person is not given a Miranda warning before the interrogation is conducted, statements made by them during the interrogation may not be admissible in a trial, but the prosecution may still present other forms of evidence, or statements made during interrogations where the defendant was read their Miranda rights.
- Police officers in the United States are not required to identify themselves as police in undercover work, and may lie when engaged in such work. Claiming entrapment as a defense depends on whether the defendant was improperly induced by undue pressure from government agents (or others acting under police direction) to commit crimes they would not have otherwise committed.
- It is not illegal in the US to shout "fire" in a crowded theater. Although this is often given as an example of speech that is not protected by the First Amendment, it is not now nor has it ever been binding law. The phrase originates from Justice Oliver Wendell Holmes Jr.'s opinion in the United States Supreme Court case Schenck v. United States in 1919, which held that the defendant's speech in opposition to the draft during World War I was not protected free speech. However, that case was not about shouting "fire" and the decision was later overturned by Brandenburg v. Ohio in 1969.
- The US Armed Forces have generally forbidden military enlistment as a form of deferred adjudication (that is, an option for convicts to avoid jail time) since the 1980s. US Navy protocols discourage the practice, while the other four branches have specific regulations against it.
- Last meal requests do not have to be fulfilled. States have various restrictions on what can be requested, up to not permitting them at all.
- Although popularly known as the "red telephone", the Moscow–Washington hotline was never a telephone line, nor were red phones used. The first implementation of the hotline used teletype equipment, which was replaced by facsimile (fax) machines in 1988. Since 2008, the hotline has been a secure computer link over which the two countries exchange email. Moreover, the hotline links the Kremlin to the Pentagon—based in Arlington County, Virginia—and not the White House.
- The nuclear football, the briefcase used by presidents to launch nuclear attacks, does not contain a large red button to launch an attack. Rather, its primary use is to confirm the president's identity, and to facilitate communication with the Pentagon.
- Twinkies were not claimed to be the cause of San Francisco mayor George Moscone's and supervisor Harvey Milk's murders. In the trial of Dan White, the defense successfully argued White's diminished capacity as a result of depression. While eating Twinkies was cited as evidence of this depression, it was never claimed to be the cause of the murders.
- Neither the Mafia nor other criminal organizations regularly use or have used cement shoes to drown their victims. There are only two documented cases of this method being used in murders: one in 1964 and one in 2016 (although, in the former, the victim had concrete blocks tied to his legs rather than being enclosed in cement). The French Army did use cement shoes on Algerians killed in death flights during the Algerian War.
- Embalming is not legally required in the United States. The Federal Trade Commission passed a rule in 1984 forbidding making this claim, to prevent the funeral industry from promoting the misconception for financial gain.
- Half of marriages do not end in divorce. Rates peaked at around 41% in the 1970s but have since declined. Marriages in more recent generations have been lasting longer and are less likely to end in divorce. Those wed in the 2000s were divorcing at the lowest rates since the 1970s, and it was predicted that eventually around two-thirds of marriages would last if present trends continue.
- It is legal to use the .50 BMG cartridge, for example in the M2 Browning machine gun, against enemy personnel. There have been limitations on the use of .50 caliber ammunition against enemy soldiers, but for tactical and not for legal reasons.

== Literature ==
- Many quotations are incorrect or attributed to people who never uttered them, and quotations from obscure or unknown authors are often attributed to more famous figures. Commonly misquoted individuals include Mark Twain, Oscar Wilde, Albert Einstein, Adolf Hitler, Winston Churchill, Abraham Lincoln, William Shakespeare, Bill Gates, Steve Jobs, Confucius, Sun Tzu, and the Buddha.
- Mary Shelley's 1818 novel Frankenstein is named after the fictional scientist Victor Frankenstein, who created the sapient creature in the novel, not the creature itself, which is never named in the novel and is now usually called Frankenstein's monster. However, as later adaptations started to refer to the monster itself as Frankenstein, this usage became well-established, and some no longer regard it as erroneous.
- Ernest Hemingway did not author the flash fiction story "For sale: baby shoes, never worn". The story was not attributed to him until decades after he died.

== Music ==
=== Classical music ===
- Beethoven was never entirely deaf. Even by the end of his life, he could detect certain frequencies, albeit in a very diminished way.
- The musical interval tritone was not banned by the Catholic Church and was not associated with devils during the Middle Ages. Early medieval music used the tritone in Gregorian chant for certain modes. Guido of Arezzo (c. 991 – c. 1033) was the first theorist to discourage the interval.
- Mozart did not die from poisoning, and was not poisoned by his colleague Antonio Salieri or anyone else. The rumor originated soon after Salieri's death and was dramatized in Alexander Pushkin's play Mozart and Salieri (1832), and later in the 1979 play Amadeus by Peter Shaffer and the subsequent 1984 film Amadeus. See Mozart myths § Death for further information.
- The minuets in G major and G minor by Christian Petzold is commonly attributed to Johann Sebastian Bach, although the piece was identified in the 1970s as a movement from a harpsichord suite by Petzold. The misconception stems from Notebook for Anna Magdalena Bach, a book of sheet music by various composers (mostly Bach) in which the minuet is found. Compositions that are doubtful as works of Bach are cataloged as "BWV Anh.", short for "Bach-Werke-Verzeichnis Anhang" ("Bach works catalogue annex"); the minuet is assigned to BWV Anh. 114.
- Listening to Mozart or classical music does not enhance intelligence (or IQ). A study from 1993 reported a short-term improvement in spatial reasoning. However, the weight of subsequent evidence supports either a null effect or short-term effects related to increases in mood and arousal, with mixed results published after the initial report in Nature.

Minute Waltz
Pronunciation of minute in "Minute Waltz"

- The "Minute Waltz" by Frédéric Chopin takes, on average, two minutes to play as originally written. Its name comes from the adjective minute, meaning "small", and not the noun referring to a period of sixty seconds spelled the same.

=== Popular music ===
- "Edelweiss" is not the national anthem of Austria, but an original composition created for the 1959 musical The Sound of Music. The Austrian national anthem is "Land der Berge, Land am Strome" ("Land of the Mountains, Land by the River [Danube]").
- The Beatles' 1965 appearance at Shea Stadium was not the first time that a rock concert was played at a large, outdoor sports stadium in the United States; such venues were employed by Elvis Presley in the 1950s and the Beatles themselves in 1964.
- The Monkees did not outsell the Beatles' and the Rolling Stones' combined record sales in 1967. Michael Nesmith originated the claim in a 1977 interview as a prank.
- The Rolling Stones were not performing "Sympathy for the Devil" at the 1969 Altamont Free Concert when Meredith Hunter was stabbed to death by a member of the local Hells Angels chapter that was serving as security. The stabbing occurred later as the band was performing "Under My Thumb".
- Concept albums did not begin with rock music in the 1960s. The format had already been employed by singers such as Frank Sinatra in the 1940s and 1950s.
- Cass Elliot (of The Mamas & the Papas) did not die from choking on a ham sandwich. This falsehood was initiated by her manager who wanted to avoid the implication that her death was associated with substance abuse.
- Phil Collins did not write his 1981 hit "In the Air Tonight" about witnessing someone drowning and then confronting the person in the audience who let it happen. According to Collins himself, it was about his emotions when divorcing from his first wife.
- Popular musicians are not more likely to die at the age of 27. The notion of a "27 Club" arose after the deaths, in a ten-month period, of Jimi Hendrix, Janis Joplin, and Jim Morrison, and later the deaths of Kurt Cobain and Amy Winehouse. Statistical studies have shown that there is no scientific basis for this idea.
- The song "Puff, the Magic Dragon" was not written about drugs. Both of the song's co-writers consistently and emphatically denied this interpretation throughout their lives, stating that the song is solely about the loss of childhood innocence.

== Religion ==
=== Buddhism ===
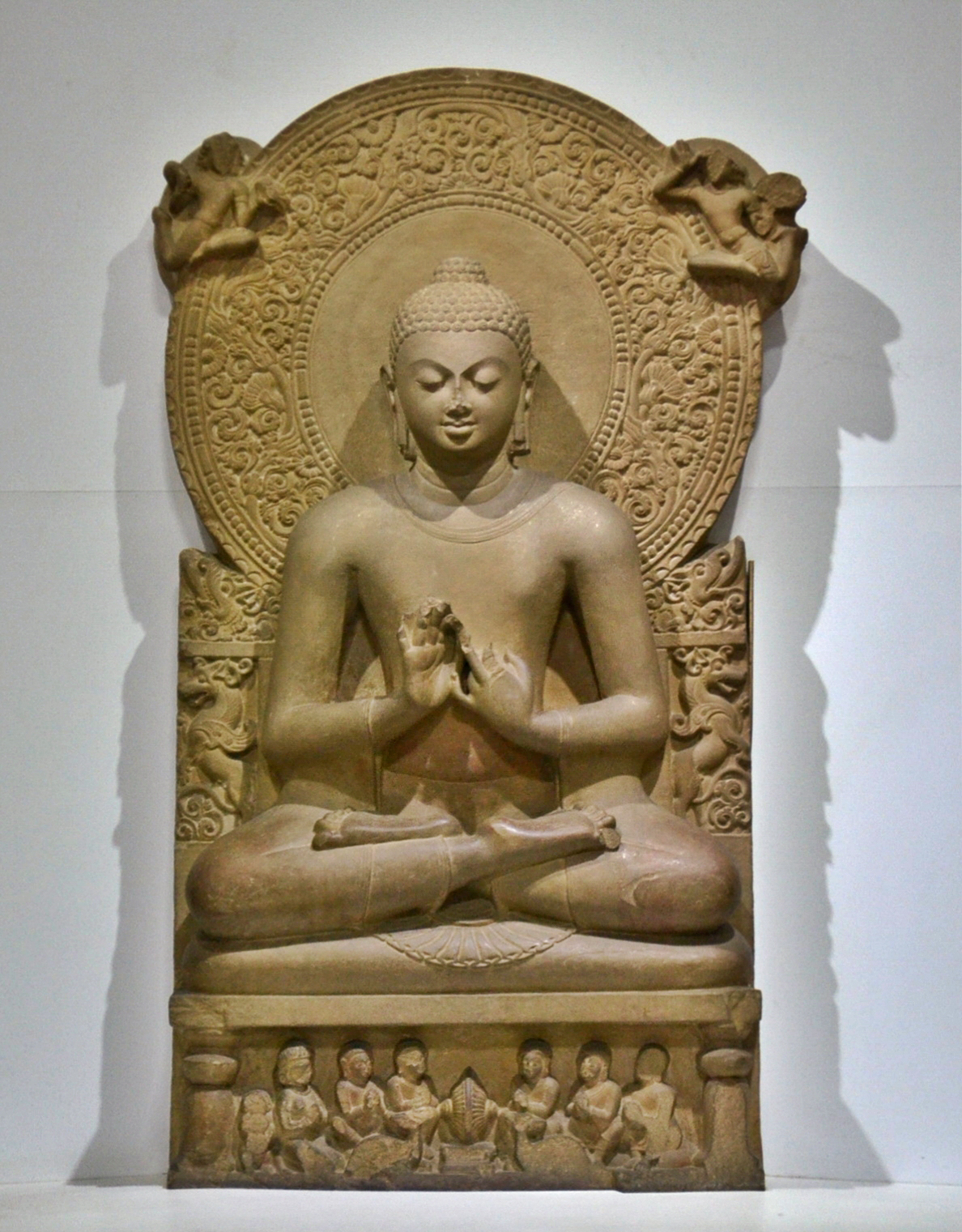
Statue of the Buddha (Siddhartha Gautama)

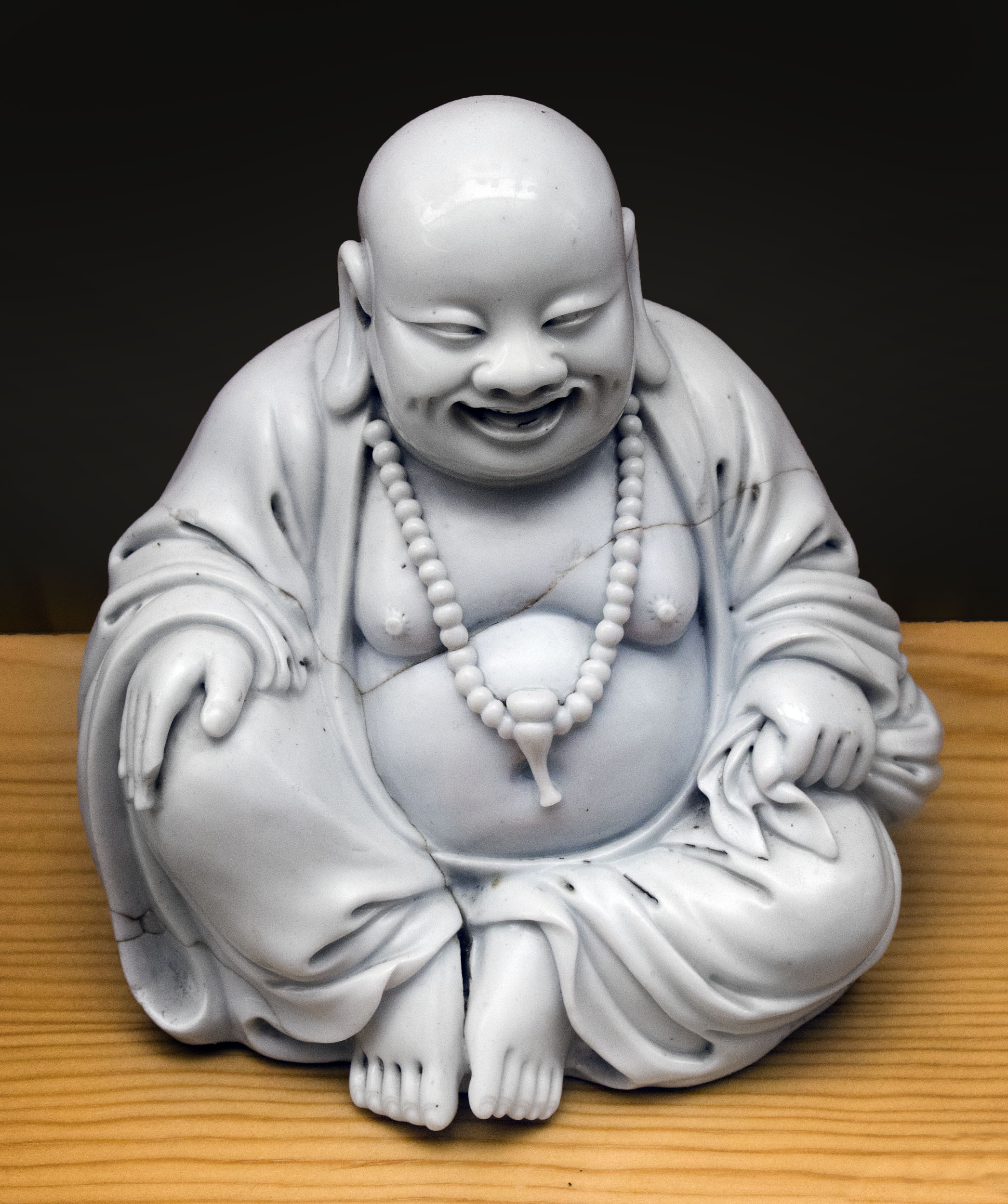
Statue of Budai, often incorrectly referred to as the "Buddha"

- The chubby, bald monk with lengthened ears who is often depicted laughing, known as the "fat Buddha" or "laughing Buddha" in the West, is a depiction of the Chinese Buddhist folk hero Budai, not Siddhartha Gautama, the historical figure usually referenced by the phrase 'the Buddha.' 'Buddha' is a role or title in Buddhism which can properly be applied to both Budai and Siddhartha, but they are separate figures. Siddhartha is most often depicted as a thin man, concentrated in meditation.

=== Christianity ===
- Jesus was most likely not born on December 25, when his birth is traditionally celebrated as Christmas. It is more likely that his birth was in either the season of spring or perhaps summer. Although the Common Era ostensibly counts the years since the birth of Jesus, it is unlikely that he was born in either AD 1 or 1 BC, as such a numbering system would imply. Modern historians estimate a date closer to between 6 BC and 4 BC.
- The Bible does not say that exactly three magi came to visit the baby Jesus, nor that they were kings, or rode on camels, or that their names were Caspar, Melchior, and Balthazar, nor what color their skin was. Three magi are inferred because three gifts are described, but the Bible says only that there was more than one magus.

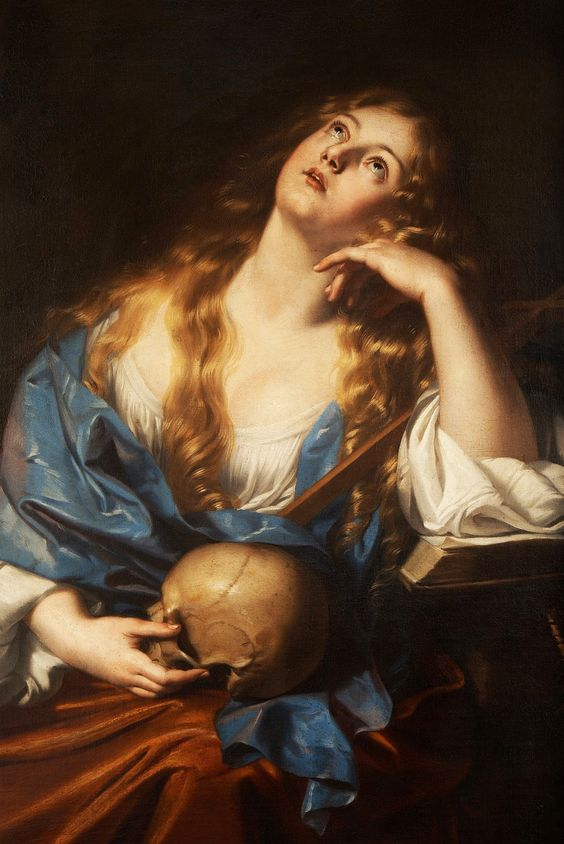
No evidence supports Mary Magdalene having been a prostitute.

- The idea that Mary Magdalene was a prostitute before she met Jesus is not found in the Bible or in any of the other earliest Christian writings. It has been a disputed doctrine in several theological traditions whether Mary Magdalene, Mary of Bethany (who anoints Jesus' feet in John 11:1–12), and the unnamed "sinful woman" who anoints Jesus' feet in Luke 7:36–50 were the same woman.
- Paul the Apostle's name was not changed from Saul. He was born a Jew, with Roman citizenship inherited from his father, and thus carried both a Hebrew and a Greco-Roman name from birth, as mentioned by Luke in Acts 13:9: "...Saul, who also is called Paul...".
- The Roman Catholic dogma of the Immaculate Conception is unrelated to the Christian doctrine that Mary conceived and gave birth to Jesus while remaining a virgin. The Immaculate Conception is the belief that Mary was free of original sin from the moment of her own conception by her parents, Joachim and Anne. A less common mistake is to think that the Immaculate Conception means that Mary herself was conceived without sexual intercourse.
- Roman Catholic dogma does not say that the pope is either sinless (as is commonly believed among non-Catholic Christians) or always infallible. Catholic dogma since 1870 does state that a divine revelation by the pope (generally called ex cathedra) is free from error, but it does not hold that he is always free from error, even when speaking in his official capacity.
- Members of the Church of Jesus Christ of Latter-day Saints (LDS Church) no longer practice polygamy. The Church excommunicates any members who practice polygamy within the organization. Some Mormon fundamentalist sects do practice polygamy.
- The First Council of Nicaea did not establish the books of the Bible. The Old Testament had likely already been established by Hebrew scribes before Christ. The development of the New Testament canon was mostly completed in the third century before the Nicaea Council was convened in 325; it was finalized, along with the deuterocanon, at the Council of Rome in 382.
- Constantine the Great did not make Christianity the official religion of the Roman Empire. While he was the first Christian emperor and promoted religious tolerance with the Edict of Milan, Christianity was not declared the official religion of the Roman Empire until AD 380, some 43 years after Constantine's death.
- The Seven Deadly Sins are not listed in the Bible. The concept originated with the early-Christian theologian Tertullian, with Gregory I listing them in the form that is common today.

=== Islam ===
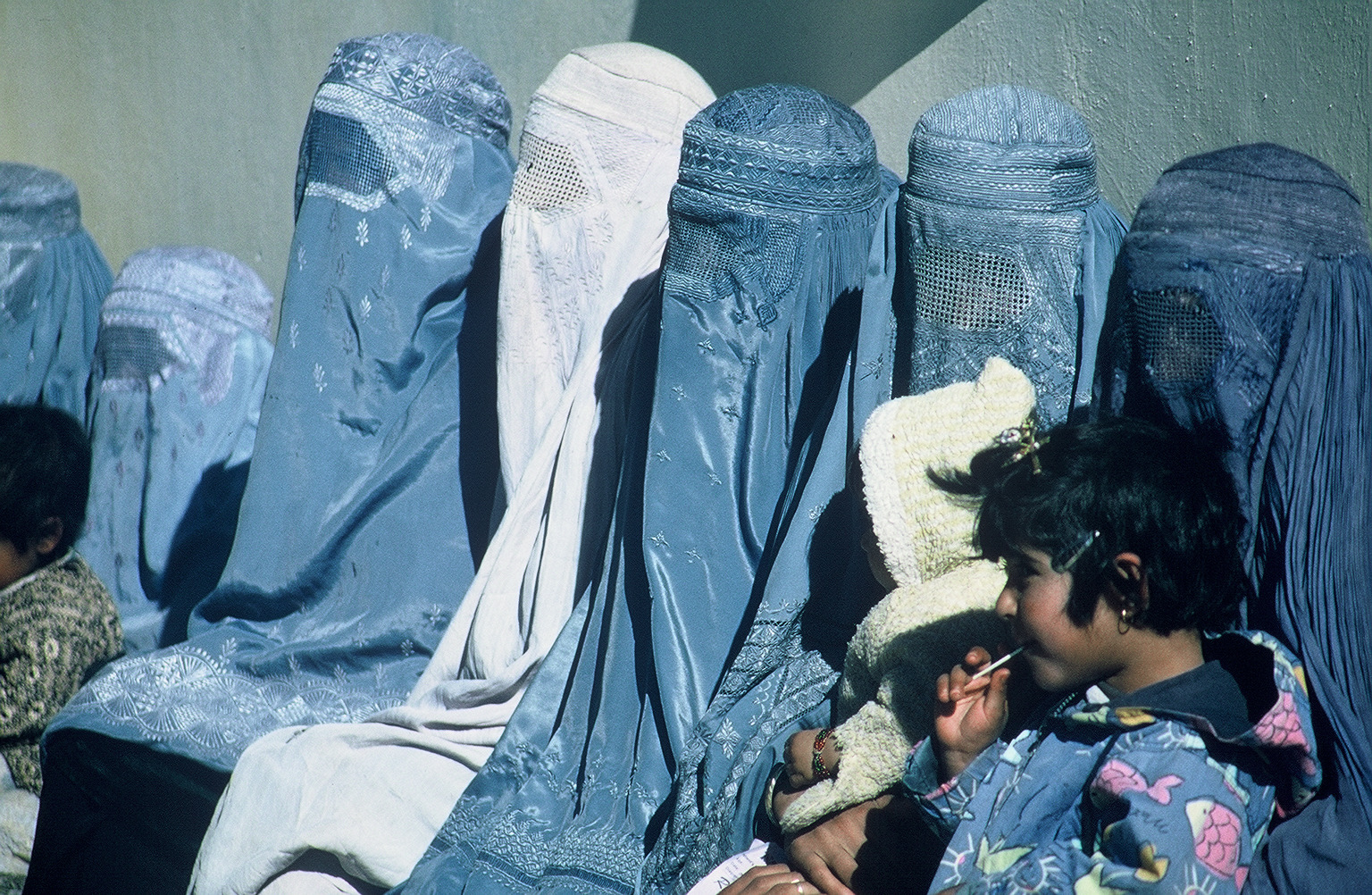
Afghan women wearing burqas

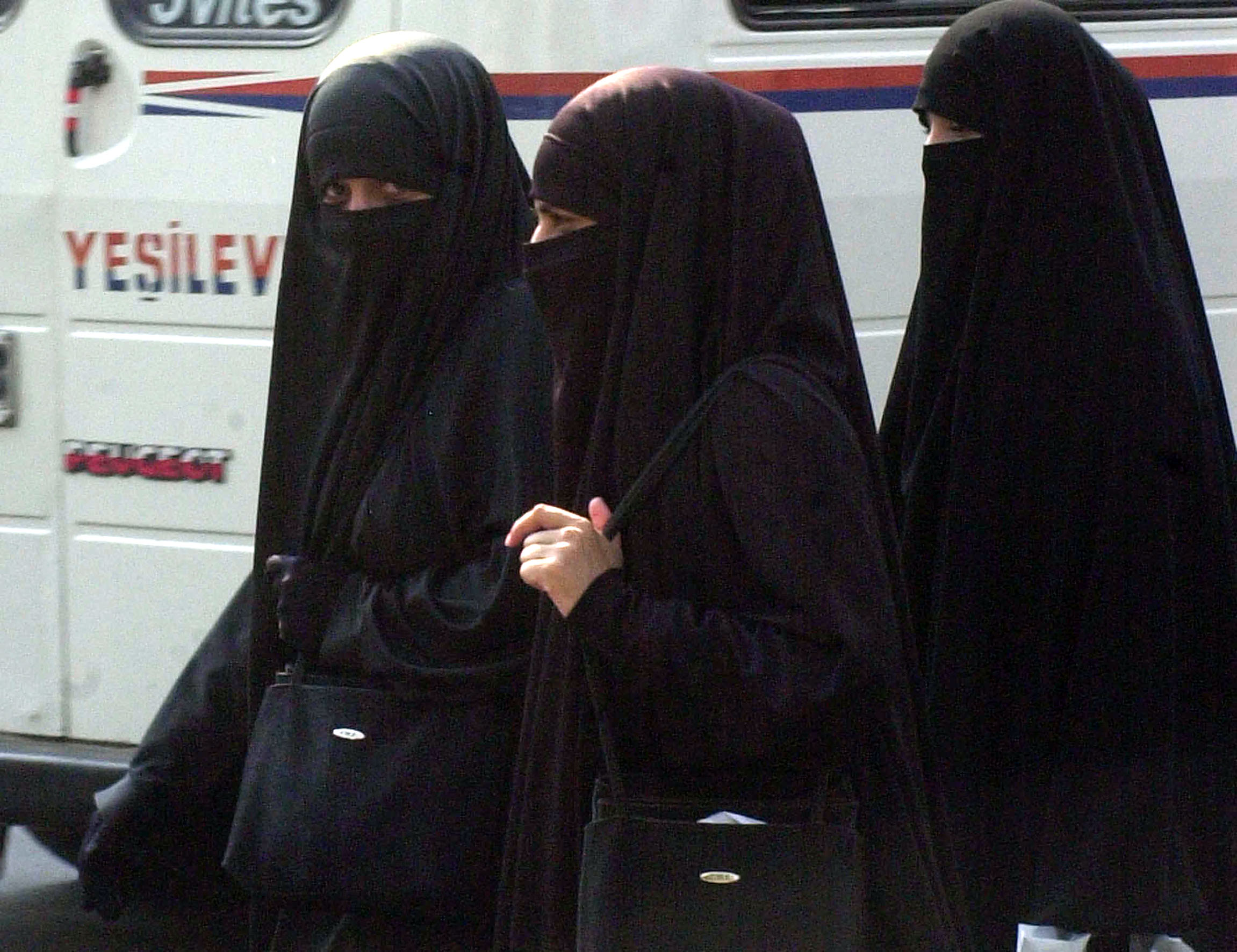
Turkish women wearing niqābs

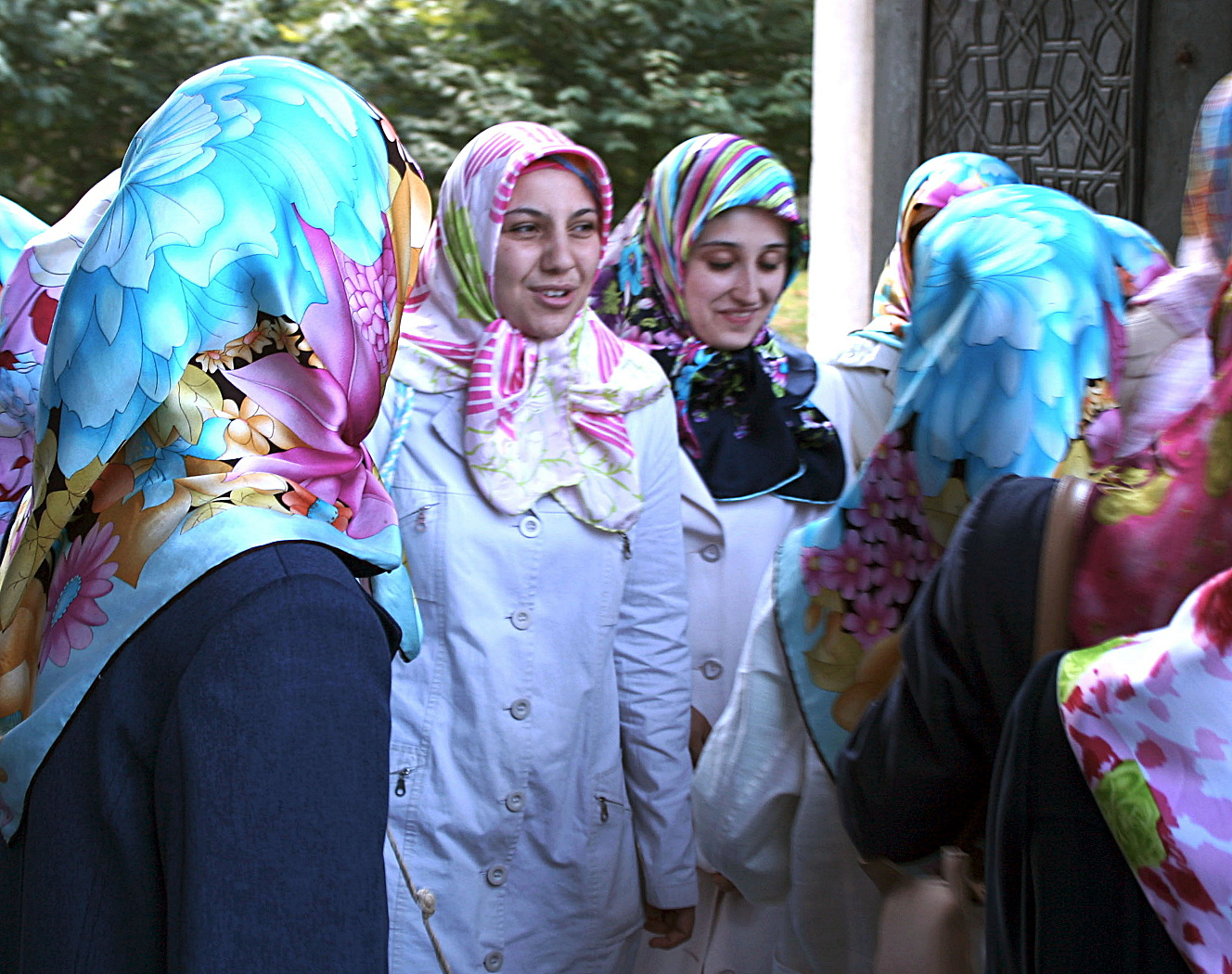
Turkish women wearing hijabs

- The burqa (also transliterated as burka or burkha) is often confused with other types of head-wear worn by Muslim women, particularly the niqāb and the hijab. A burqa covers the body, head, and face, with a mesh grille to see through. A niqab covers the hair and face, excluding the eyes. A hijab covers the hair and chest but not the face.
- Not all Muslim women wear face or head coverings.
- A fatwa is a generally non-binding legal opinion issued by an Islamic scholar under Islamic law; it is therefore commonplace for fatwa from different authors to disagree. The misconception that it is a death sentence stems from a decree issued by Ayatollah Ruhollah Khomeini of Iran in 1989 where he said that the author Salman Rushdie had earned a death sentence for blasphemy. It is debated whether this was a fatwa.
- The word jihad does not always mean 'holy war'; its literal meaning in Arabic is 'struggle'. While there is such a thing as jihad by the sword, jihad can be any spiritual or moral effort or struggle, such as seeking knowledge, putting others before oneself, and inviting others to Islam.
- The Quran does not promise martyrs 72 virgins in heaven. It only mentions that companions, houri, are given to all people in heaven (men and women, martyr or not). Arabic words translated as "virgins" in Western media could be more accurately translated as "angel" or "heavenly being".

=== Judaism ===
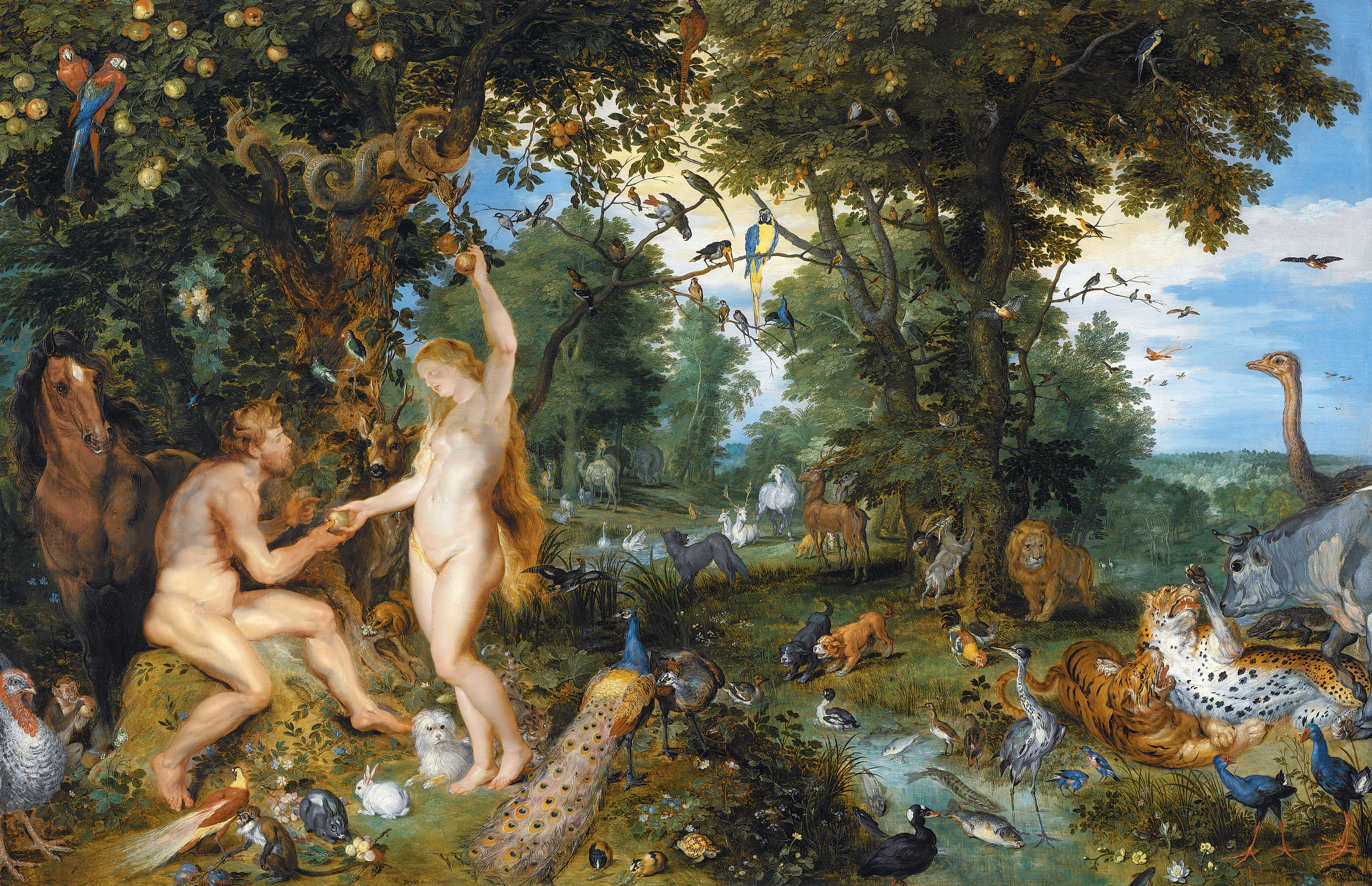
The fruit in the Garden of Eden is not named in the Book of Genesis.

- The forbidden fruit mentioned in the Book of Genesis is never identified as an apple, as widely depicted in Western art. The original Hebrew texts mention only fruit.
- While tattoos are forbidden by the Book of Leviticus, Jews with tattoos are not barred from being buried in a Jewish cemetery, just as violators of other prohibitions are not barred, as is commonly believed among American Jews.

== Sports ==
- Artificial turf is not maintenance free. It requires regular maintenance, such as raking and patching, to keep it functional and safe.
- The name golf is not an acronym for "Gentlemen Only, Ladies Forbidden". It may have come from the Dutch word kolf or kolve, meaning "club", or from the Scottish word goulf or gowf meaning "to strike or cuff".
- Baseball was not invented by Abner Doubleday, nor did it originate in Cooperstown, New York. Lacking a singular inventor, it is believed to have evolved from bat-and-ball games such as rounders and first took its modern form in New York City.

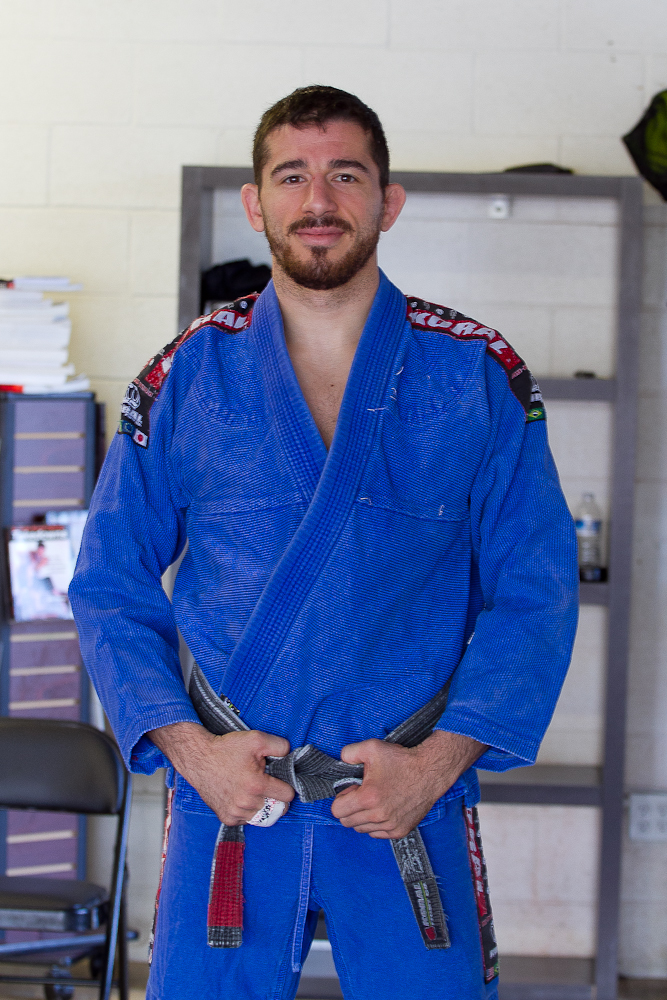
A BJJ black belt with a red bar indicating first degree

- The black belt in martial arts does not necessarily indicate expert level. It was introduced for judo in the 1880s to indicate competency at all of the basic techniques of the sport. Promotion beyond 1st dan (the first black belt rank) varies among different martial arts.
- The use of triangular corner flags in English football is not a privilege reserved for those teams that have won an FA Cup in the past, as depicted in a scene in the film Twin Town. The Football Association's rules are silent on the subject, and the decision over what shape flag to use has been up to the individual club's groundskeepers.
- India did not withdraw from the 1950 FIFA World Cup because their squad wanted to play barefoot. In reality, India withdrew because the country's managing body, the All India Football Federation (AIFF), was insufficiently prepared for the team's participation.

== Video games ==
- There is no definitive proof that violent video games cause people to become violent. Some studies have found no link between aggression and violent video games, and the popularity of gaming has coincided with a decrease in youth violence, though the two trends have not been definitively linked. The moral panic surrounding video games in the 1980s through to the 2020s, alongside several studies and incidents of violence and legislation in many countries, likely contributed to proliferating this idea.
- The so-called "Nuclear Gandhi" glitch, in which peaceful leader Mahatma Gandhi would become unusually aggressive if democracy was adopted, did not exist in either the original Civilization game or Civilization II. The games' designer Sid Meier attributed the origins of the rumor to both a TV Tropes thread and a Know Your Meme entry, while Reddit and a Kotaku article helped popularize it. Gandhi's supposed behavior did appear in the 2010 Civilization V as a joke, and in 2016's VI as a reference to the legend.
- The Japanese government did not pass a law banning Square Enix from releasing the Dragon Quest games on weekdays due to it causing too many schoolchildren to cut class. This rule is self-imposed by the developers.
- The release of Space Invaders in 1978 did not cause a shortage of ¥100 coins in Japan. An advertising campaign by Taito and an erroneous 1980 article in New Scientist are the sources of this claim.
