= Folk etymology =

Process of reinterpretive word formation

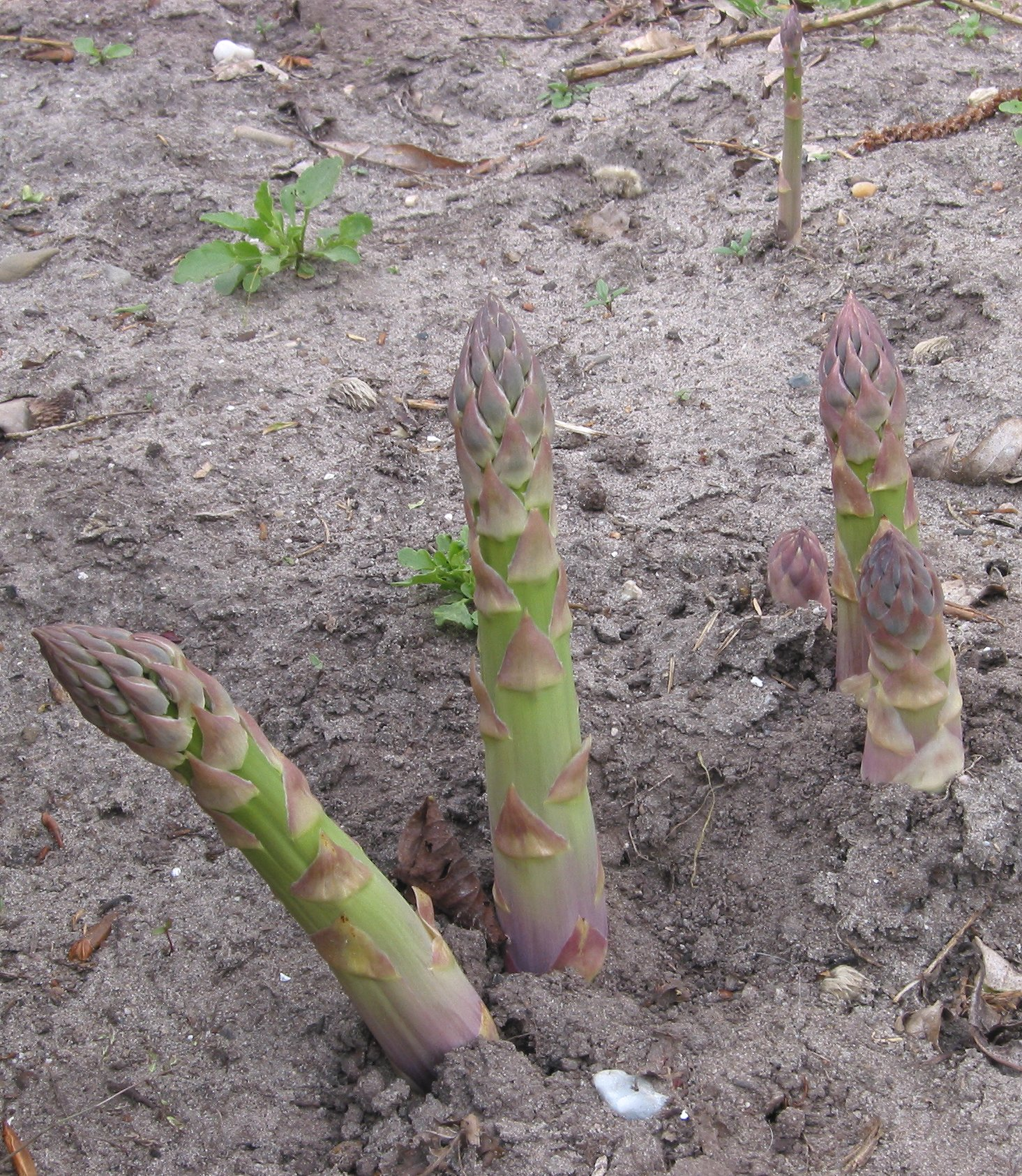
An example of folk etymology is the dialectal English word sparrowgrass for asparagus.

Folk etymology (Note: Also known as generative popular etymology, analogical reformation, morphological reanalysis, spook etymology, and etymological reinterpretation.) is a change in a word or phrase resulting from the replacement of an unfamiliar form by a more familiar one through popular usage. The form or the meaning of an archaic, foreign, or otherwise unfamiliar word is reinterpreted as resembling more familiar words or morphemes.

The term folk etymology is a loan translation from German Volksetymologie, coined by Ernst Förstemann in 1852. Folk etymology is a productive process in historical linguistics, language change, and social interaction. Reanalysis of a word's history or original form can affect its spelling, pronunciation, or meaning. This is frequently seen in relation to loanwords or words that have become archaic or obsolete.

Folk/popular etymology may also refer to a popular false belief about the etymology of a word or phrase that does not lead to a change in the form or meaning, also known as a false etymology. To disambiguate the usage of the term "folk/popular etymology", Ghil'ad Zuckermann proposes a clear-cut distinction between the derivational-only popular etymology (DOPE) and the generative popular etymology (GPE): the DOPE refers to a popular false etymology involving no neologization, and the GPE refers to neologization generated by a popular false etymology.

Examples of words created or changed through folk etymology include the English dialectal form sparrowgrass, originally from Greek ἀσπάραγος ("asparagus") remade by analogy to the more familiar words sparrow and grass. When the alteration of an unfamiliar word or phrase is spontaneously performed by an individual, it is known as an eggcorn.

== Productive force ==
The technical term "folk etymology" refers to a change in the form of a word caused by erroneous popular suppositions about its etymology. Until the academic development of comparative linguistics and description of laws underlying sound changes, the derivation of a word was mostly guess-work. Speculation about the original form of words in turn feeds back into the development of the word and thus becomes a part of a new etymology.

Believing a word to have a certain origin, people begin to pronounce, spell, or otherwise use the word in a manner appropriate to that perceived origin. This popular etymologizing has had a powerful influence on the forms which words take. Examples in English include crayfish or crawfish, which are not historically related to fish but come from Middle English crevis, cognate with French écrevisse. Likewise chaise lounge, from the original French chaise longue ("long chair"), has come to be associated with the word lounge.

== Related phenomena ==
Other types of language change caused by reanalysis of the structure of a word include rebracketing and back-formation.

In rebracketing, users of the language change, misinterpret, or reinterpret the location of a boundary between words or morphemes. For example, the Old French word orenge 'orange tree' comes from Arabic النَّرَنْج an-naranj 'the orange tree', with the initial ⟨n⟩ of naranj understood as part of the article. Rebracketing in the opposite direction saw the Middle English a napron and a nadder become an apron and an adder.

In back-formation, a new word is created by removing elements from an existing word that are interpreted as affixes. For example, Italian pronuncia 'pronunciation, accent' is derived from the verb pronunciare 'to pronounce, to utter' and English edit derives from editor. Some cases of back-formation are based on folk etymology.

== Examples in English ==
In linguistic change caused by folk etymology, the form of a word changes so that it better matches its popular rationalisation. Typically this happens either to unanalysable foreign words or to compounds where the word underlying one part of the compound becomes obsolete.

=== Loanwords ===
There are many examples of words borrowed from foreign languages, and subsequently changed by folk etymology.

The spelling of many borrowed words reflects folk etymology. For example, andiron borrowed from Old French was variously spelled aundyre or aundiren in Middle English, but was altered by association with iron. Other Old French loans altered in a similar manner include belfry (from berfrey) by association with bell, female (from femelle) by male, and penthouse (from apentis) by house. The variant spelling of licorice as liquorice comes from the supposition that it has something to do with liquid. Anglo-Norman licoris (influenced by licor 'liquor') and Late Latin liquirītia were respelled for similar reasons, though the ultimate origin of all three is Ancient Greek γλυκύρριζα glucúrrhiza 'sweet root'.

Reanalysis of loan words can affect their spelling, pronunciation, or meaning. The word cockroach, for example, was borrowed from Spanish cucaracha but was assimilated to the existing English words cock and roach. The phrase forlorn hope originally meant "storming party, body of skirmishers" from Dutch verloren hoop "lost troop". But confusion with English hope has given the term an additional meaning of "hopeless venture".

Sometimes imaginative stories are created to account for the link between a borrowed word and its popularly assumed sources. The names of the serviceberry, service tree, and related plants, for instance, come from the Latin name sorbus. The plants were called syrfe in Old English, which eventually became service. Fanciful stories suggest that the name comes from the fact that the trees bloom in spring, a time when circuit-riding preachers resume church services or when funeral services are carried out for people who died during the winter.

A seemingly plausible but no less speculative etymology accounts for the form of Welsh rarebit, a dish made of cheese and toasted bread. The earliest known reference to the dish in 1725 called it Welsh rabbit. The origin of that name is unknown, but presumably humorous, since the dish contains no rabbit. In 1785 Francis Grose suggested in A Classical Dictionary of the Vulgar Tongue that the dish is "a Welch rare bit", though the word rarebit was not common prior to Grose's dictionary. Both versions of the name are in current use; individuals sometimes express strong opinions concerning which version is correct.

=== Obsolete forms ===
When a word or other form becomes obsolete, words or phrases containing the obsolete portion may be reanalyzed and changed.

Some compound words from Old English were reanalyzed in Middle or Modern English when one of the constituent words fell out of use. Examples include bridegroom from Old English brydguma 'bride-man'. The word gome 'man' from Old English guma fell out of use during the sixteenth century and the compound was eventually reanalyzed with the Modern English word groom 'male servant'. A similar reanalysis caused sandblind, from unattested Old English *sāmblind 'half-blind' with a once-common prefix sām- 'semi-', to be respelled as though it is related to sand. The word island derives from Old English igland. The modern spelling with the letter s is the result of comparison with the synonym isle from Old French and ultimately as a Latinist borrowing of insula, though the Old French and Old English words are not historically related. In a similar way, the spelling of wormwood was likely affected by comparison with wood.

The phrase curry favour, meaning to flatter, comes from Middle English curry favel 'groom a chestnut horse'. This was an allusion to a fourteenth-century French morality poem, Roman de Fauvel, about a chestnut-coloured horse who corrupts men through duplicity. The phrase was reanalyzed in early Modern English by comparison to favour as early as 1510.

Words need not completely disappear before their compounds are reanalyzed. The word shamefaced was originally shamefast. The original meaning of fast 'fixed in place' still exists, as in the compounded words steadfast and colorfast, but by itself mainly in frozen expressions such as stuck fast, hold fast, and play fast and loose. The songbird wheatear or white-ear is a back-formation from Middle English whit-ers 'white arse', referring to the prominent white rump found in most species. Although both white and arse are common in Modern English, the folk etymology may be euphemism.

Reanalysis of archaic or obsolete forms can lead to changes in meaning as well. The original meaning of hangnail referred to a corn on the foot. The word comes from Old English ang- + nægel 'anguished nail, compressed spike', but the spelling and pronunciation were affected by folk etymology in the seventeenth century or earlier. Thereafter, the word came to be used for a tag of skin or torn cuticle near a fingernail or toenail.

== Other languages ==
Several words in Medieval Latin were subject to folk etymology. For example, the word widerdonum meaning 'reward' was borrowed from Old High German widarlōn 'repayment of a loan'. The l → d alteration is due to confusion with Latin donum 'gift'. Similarly, the word baceler or bacheler (related to modern English bachelor) referred to a junior knight. It is attested from the eleventh century, though its ultimate origin is uncertain. By the late Middle Ages its meaning was extended to the holder of a university degree inferior to master or doctor. This was later re-spelled baccalaureus, probably reflecting a false derivation from bacca laurea 'laurel berry', alluding to the possible laurel crown of a poet or conqueror.

Likewise in Greek myth, many religious terms are folk-etymologised to suit common vocabulary. In Plato’s dialogue Cratylus, the name of Zeus is folk-etymologised to connect it to zô (the verb for "to live"), giving it the meaning "cause of life always to all things", because of puns connecting alternate variants and declensions of his name (Zḗn and Día) with the Greek words for "to live" and "because of"; in reality, his name is a reflex of *Dyēus, an PIE root meaning "bright/shining one".

Diodorus Siculus likewise wrote that Zeus was also called Zen, because the humans believed that he was the cause of life. Meanwhile, Lactantius wrote that he was called Zeus and Zen not because he is the giver of life, but because he was the first who lived of the children of Cronus—therefore making the meaning of his name "the one who lived". The name of Orion, likewise, is folk-etymologised as a polite alteration of "Urion", referring to his conception through the gods urinating on his mother's ashes; his name is speculated today to have been borrowed from Akkadian Uru-annak, meaning "Heaven's light".

In the fourteenth or fifteenth century, French scholars began to spell the verb savoir 'to know' as sçavoir on the false belief it was derived from Latin scire 'to know'. In fact it comes from sapere 'to be wise'.

The Italian word liocorno, meaning 'unicorn' derives from 13th-century lunicorno (lo 'the' + unicorno 'unicorn'). Folk etymology based on lione 'lion' altered the spelling and pronunciation. Dialectal liofante 'elephant' was likewise altered from elefante by association with lione.

Islambol, a folk etymology meaning 'Islam abounding', is one of the names of Istanbul used after the Ottoman conquest of 1453.

An example from Persian is the word شطرنج shatranj 'chess', which is derived from the Sanskrit चतुरङ्ग chatur-anga ("four-army [game]"; 2nd century BCE), and after losing the u to syncope, became چترنگ chatrang in Middle Persian (6th century CE). Today it is sometimes factorized as sad 'hundred' + ranj 'worry, mood', or 'a hundred worries'.

Some Indonesian feminists discourage usage of the term wanita ('woman') and replacing it with perempuan, since wanita itself has misogynistic roots. First, in Javanese, wanita is a portmanteau of wani ditata (dare to be controlled), also, wanita is taken from Sanskrit वनिता vanitā (someone desired by men).

In Turkey, the political Democrat Party changed its logo in 2007 to a white horse in front of a red background because many voters folk-etymologized its Turkish name Demokrat as demir kırat 'iron white-horse'.

== See also ==
- Backronym
- Chinese word for "crisis"
- Eggcorn
- Etymological fallacy
- Expressive loan
- False etymology
- False friend
- Folk linguistics
- Hobson-Jobson
- Hypercorrection
- Hyperforeignism
- Johannes Goropius Becanus
- Nirukta
- Okay
- Phono-semantic matching
- Pseudoscientific language comparison
- Semantic change
- Slang dictionary
- Wiktionary list of back-formations
- Wiktionary list of rebracketings
