= Wei-chi =

Wei-chi may refer to:

- Go (game)
- Chinese word for crisis
