= Norimaki =

Various Japanese dishes wrapped with nori

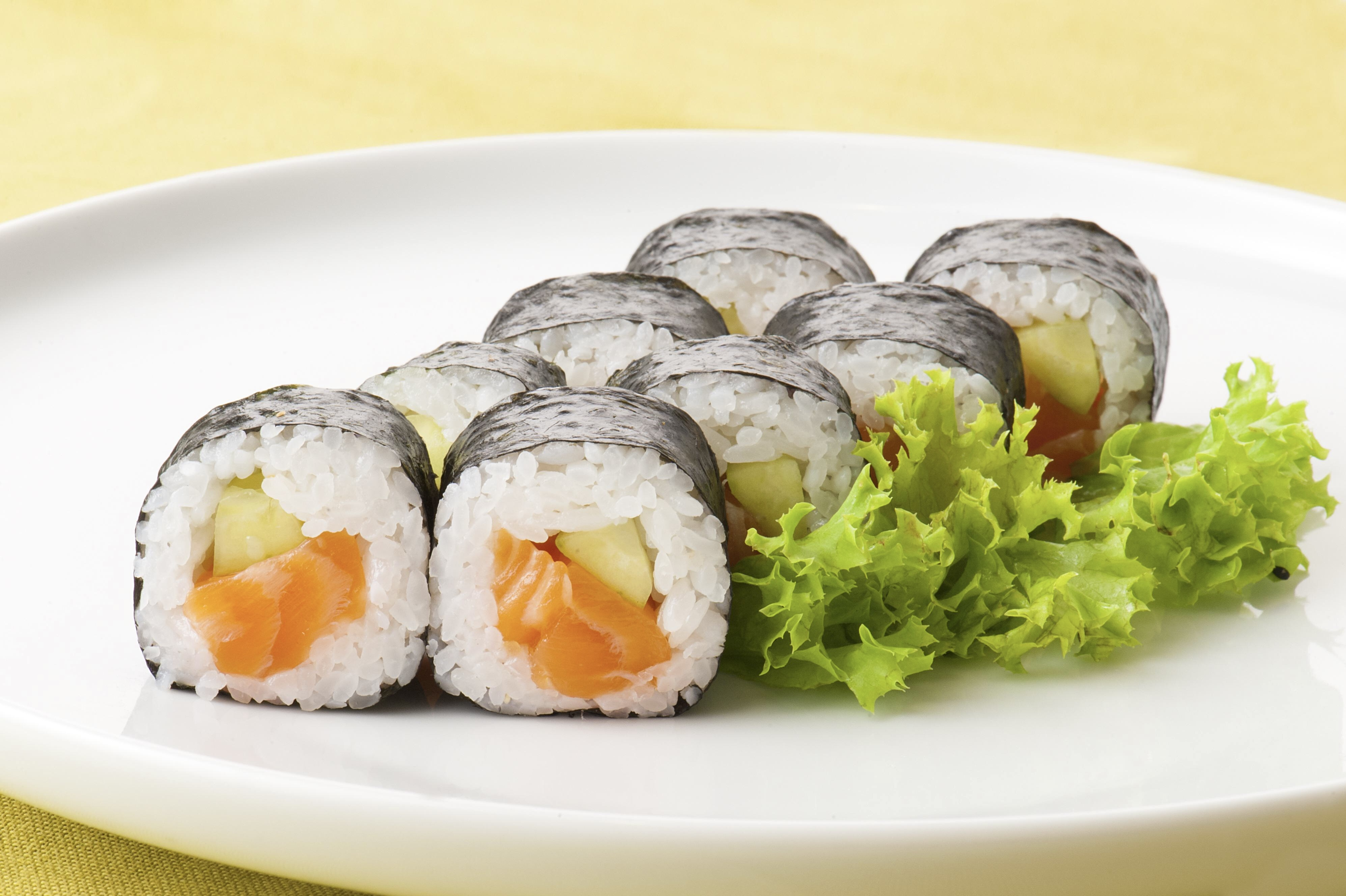
Norimaki + sushi = makizushi

Norimaki (海苔巻) also known as "seaweed rolls" is a name for many different types of Japanese foods wrapped in nori seaweed. The most common kind of norimaki is makizushi (巻き寿司), which is rolled sushi.

Other than makizushi, onigiri (おにぎり, rice balls), sashimi, senbei (煎餅, rice crackers), and chikuwa (竹輪, bamboo ring) are also regarded as norimaki if they are wrapped with seaweed.

Makizushi can be eaten as an appetizer, a main course, or part of a bento box. It is usually served with soy sauce for dipping.

== Description ==
=== Makizushi ===
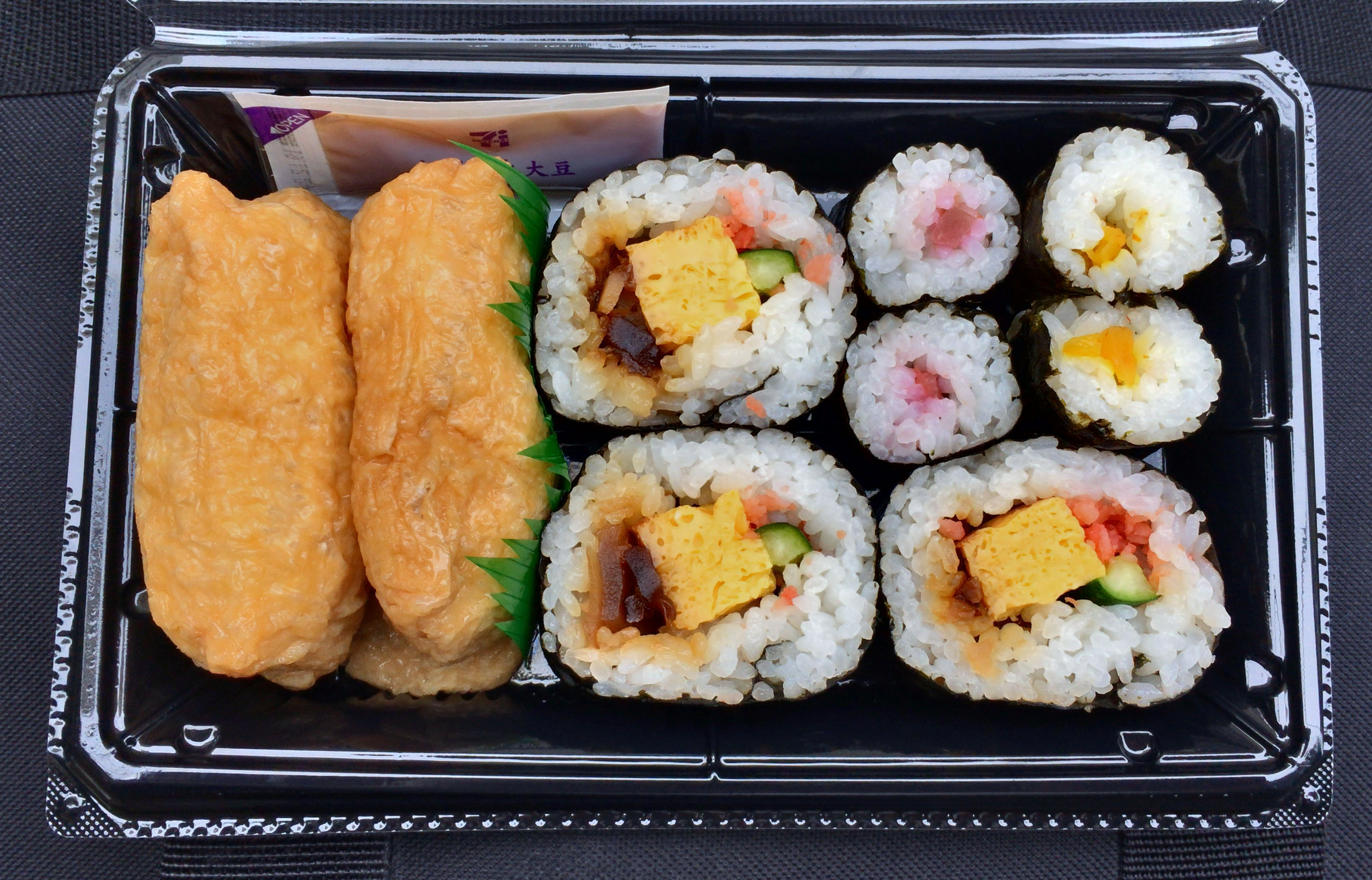
Inarizushi + makizushi = sukeroku

Makizushi (巻き寿司, "rolled sushi") was first described in the 1750 publication "Ryori SanKaigo" as makizushi (巻鮓).

In the 1787 publication "Shichigokobi", it was mentioned as being on the menus of sushi restaurants in Edo as sushi that does not stain the hands. Maki rolls are typically prepared in two ways, hand-rolled, also known as temaki, or rolled using a makisu (bamboo mat). They are usually cut into bite-sized pieces.

In the early days of makizushi, there were many other types of sushi rolled in other than seaweed, such as those rolled in thinly roasted eggs, or those rolled in shallow seaweed, wakame seaweed, or bamboo bark and so on. In Tokyo, there exists kampyo-maki (干瓢巻, dried gourd rolls) made in the Edo period.

=== Norimaki-onigiri ===
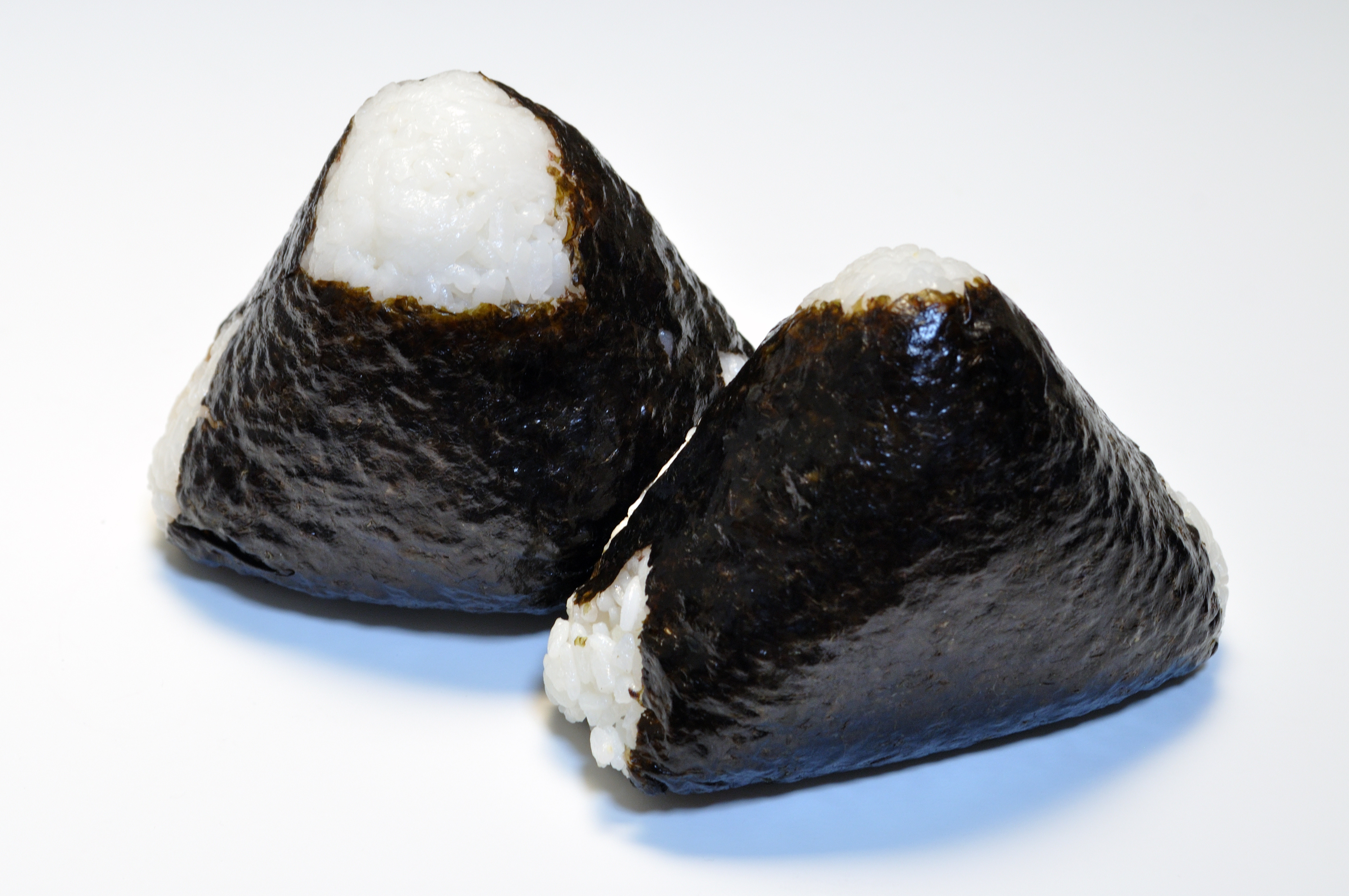
Norimaki-onigiri

The type of onigiri wrapped in nori is commonly called norimaki-onigiri (海苔巻きおにぎり). Norimaki-onigiri is a popular Japanese snack that is enjoyed by people of all ages. Nori is a type of edible seaweed that is commonly used in Japanese cuisine and adds a unique flavor and texture to the dish.

The process of making norimaki-onigiri involves cooking Japanese rice, seasoning it with vinegar and sugar, and shaping it into a ball or a triangle. The nori seaweed is then wrapped around the rice ball, creating a distinctive appearance. Norimaki-onigiri can be filled with a variety of ingredients such as salmon, tuna, or pickled vegetables. Norimaki-onigiri is convenient to eat on the go. It is often sold in convenience stores, supermarkets, and food stalls in Japan. It is also a popular snack to bring on picnics or to enjoy as a light lunch.

=== Norisenbei ===
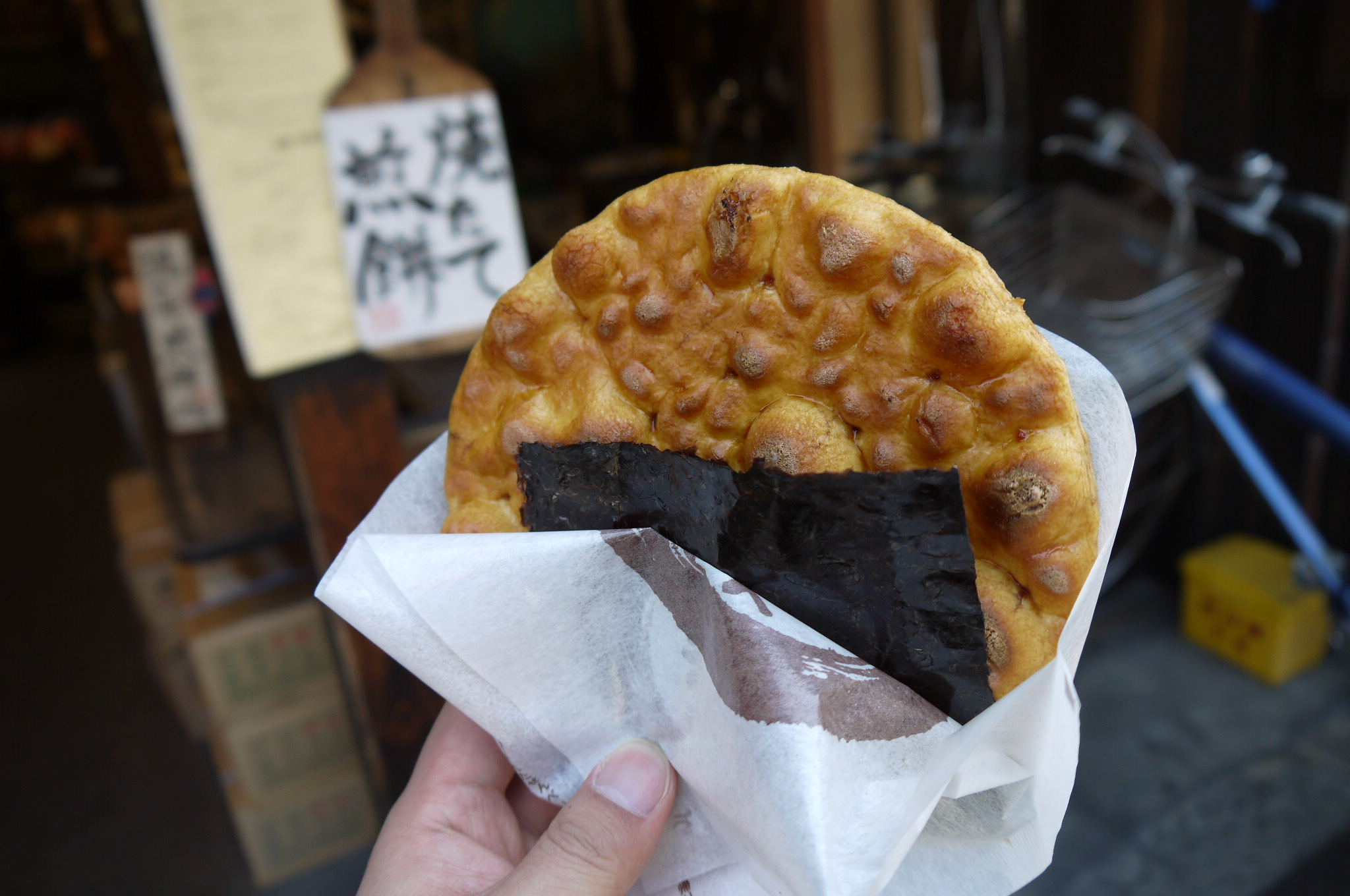
Norisenbei or Norimaki-senbei

While the type of senbei wrapped in nori is commonly abbreviated and called Norisenbei (海苔煎餅), its full expression Norimaki-senbei (海苔巻煎餅) is also possible. As small size of senbei is called arare, the wrapped type is called Norimaki-arare (海苔巻あられ), and stick type is called Shinagawa-maki (品川巻). To make norisenbei, a batter is made from rice flour, water, and sometimes other ingredients such as soy sauce or mirin. The batter is then spread onto a sheet of nori seaweed and dried in the sun or oven until crispy. The dried sheet is then cut into smaller pieces and seasoned with salt or other seasonings such as wasabi or furikake.

Norisenbei is a popular snack in Japan and is often sold in convenience stores and supermarkets. It is also commonly eaten as a snack during hanami, the Japanese tradition of enjoying the beauty of cherry blossoms in the spring.

=== Other instances ===
- Chikuwa (竹輪, bamboo ring): As chikuwa is made of fish surimi, it is often tried to add nori flavor to it in home cooking. Although it is often tried to wrap nori on it, as chikuwa itself is not sticky, it is not easy and may require tempura deep frying technique to hold the nori wrapper.
- Mochi (餅): Mochi is often cooked into isobeyaki (磯辺焼き) style, by once baked, dip shōyu (醤油) and wrap nori. It is called Isobeyaki-mochi (磯辺焼き餅). Nowadays, it is also possible to dip shōyu just before eating.
- Vienna sausage: In home cooking for preparing bento, Vienna sausage is an easy choice for its side dish. It is often wrapped with nori to eliminate discomfort within other Japanese dishes in the lunch box.
- Chicken nugget: Convenience store chain 7-Eleven Japan has been selling frozen food Norimaki-chicken (海苔巻きチキン) made in Thailand since October 2020.
- Cucumber (きゅうり): Cucumber is often used as a filling for Norimaki, particularly in vegetarian sushi rolls, such as kappamaki.
