= Kappamaki =

Seaweed-wrapped sushi roll with cucumber filling

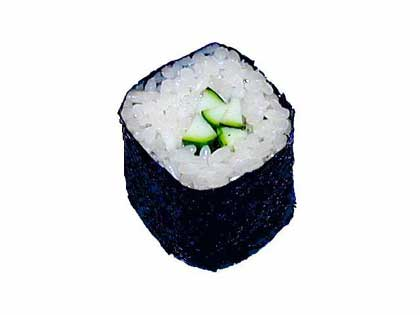
Kappa-maki

Kappamaki (Japanese: かっぱ巻き), cucumber sushi roll, is a norimaki (seaweed roll) with cucumber core. It is a typical thin sushi roll along with dried gourd rolls and tekka (thunnus sashimi) rolls.

The name "Kappa" is thought to refer to the Japanese monster kappa, but there are various theories as to the origin of this name (see below).

== History ==
Sushi rolls were born in the mid-Edo period. It is thought to have originated in Kamigata (Osaka) between 1750 and 1776. While thick sushi rolls were the norm in the Kamigata region, thin sushi rolls became the preferred sushi in Edo (present-day Tokyo). In Edo, thin sushi rolls made of kanpyō, became the most common type of sushi rolls. Later, from the end of the Edo period to the beginning of the Meiji period or in the middle of the Meiji period, tekkamaki was created with thunnus as the core.

It is widely believed that the idea of using cucumbers in sushi rolls came about in the Shōwa era (1926–1989).

There is a theory that it originated at the sushi restaurant Jingoro in Sonezaki, Kita-ku, Osaka, which was founded in 1929. According to this theory, the owner of the Jingoro invented the idea inspired by tekkamaki, and a stone pillar with the "original cucumber roll" was erected in front of the restaurant.

Naokichi Abe, who was the living embodiment of Osaka sushi, said, "There are so many originators of cucumber rolls, I don't know which one is the real one. It was conceived relatively recently, perhaps just before the Pacific War."

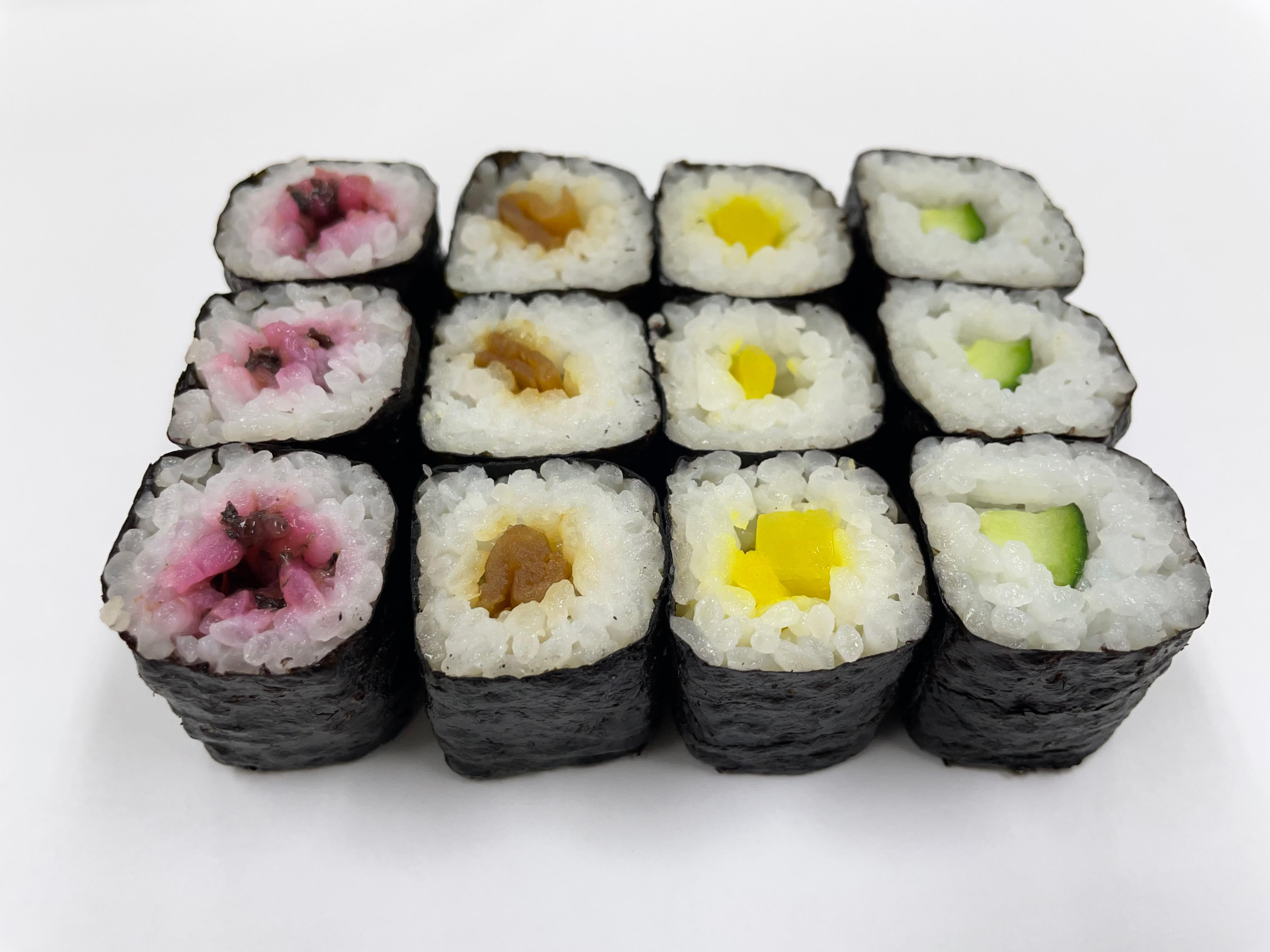
Thin sushi rolls (The rightmost row is kappamaki. Second row from the left is kanpyomaki)

There is a known theory about the origin of norimaki with cucumber that it was made at a sushi restaurant "Yahatazushi" in Nishi-Waseda, Shinjuku, Tokyo. According to this hypothesis, it was invented by Hiroshi Yasui, the fourth generation of Yahatazushi, which was founded in 1868 as a dango shop and converted to a sushi restaurant in the mid Taishō era, along with his elderly sister. Yasui was wondering if cucumbers could be used as a sushi ingredient when supplies were scarce immediately after the end of the Pacific War, and after much trial and error, he came up with the idea of rolling cucumbers raw. Since cucumber is a summer vegetable, when the cucumber roll was invented, it was a summer-only norimaki, and its light flavor with wasabi was good for summer.According to Yasui, even the family predecessor called it "wicked sushi."

The crunchy texture and refreshing coolness of cucumber made it the perfect palate freshener and its cheap price helped it spread nationwide in the 1960s.

Nowadays, due to advances in cultivation technology, cucumbers are available all year round, so kappamaki is also available throughout the year. The simple, refreshing taste of kappamaki along with dried gourd rolls, have become a staple after a nigirizushi meal. A seaweed roll with cucumber and other ingredients has also been invented and has become popular.

== Etymology and Alias ==
Kappamaki was not called so when it was created; it was called "cucumber roll." It is not clear when it became known as kappamaki. There are many theories, but they all agree that kappa means the Japanese monster kappa.

The following is a theory:

- Cucumber is a favorite food of kappa.
- The cut end of a cucumber when cut into round slices resembles the plate of a kappa's head.
- Gozu Tennō is a water deity, it is sometimes commonly referred to as the king of kappa. The crest of the shrine dedicated to Gozu Tennō is based on the cucumber flower. Gion Shrines and Ebara Shrine are mentioned as such shrines.
- Yasui of Yahatazushi, the self-proclaimed originator of the kappamaki, says that the name may have come from a picture of a kappa often drawn by the cartoonist Kon Shimizu at the time, which happened to have a cucumber in it, then seeing that, people called cucumber rolls kappamaki.

Today, "kappa" is a sign for sushi restaurants meaning cucumber. Kappa is sometimes used as an abbreviation for kappamaki. In Japanese, raincoats are also called kappa(合羽), so kappamaki is sometimes called raincoat. Around 1993, kappamaki was also called "Alcindomaki" after Alcindo Sartori of the Kashima Antlers, who was active in the early days of the J.League, which was launched that year, and was nicknamed "Kappa" because of his appearance.

== Variations ==
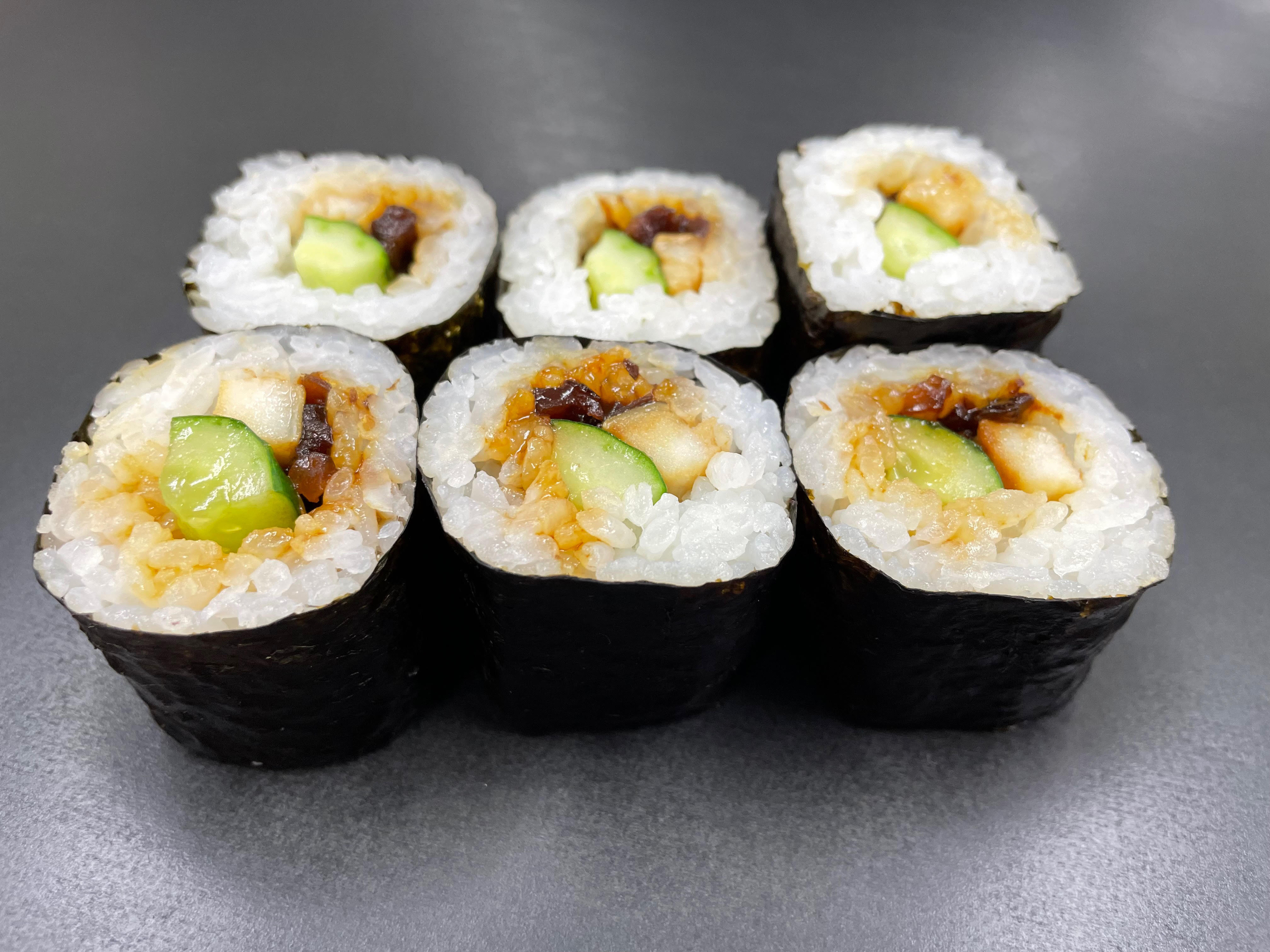
Anakyumaki

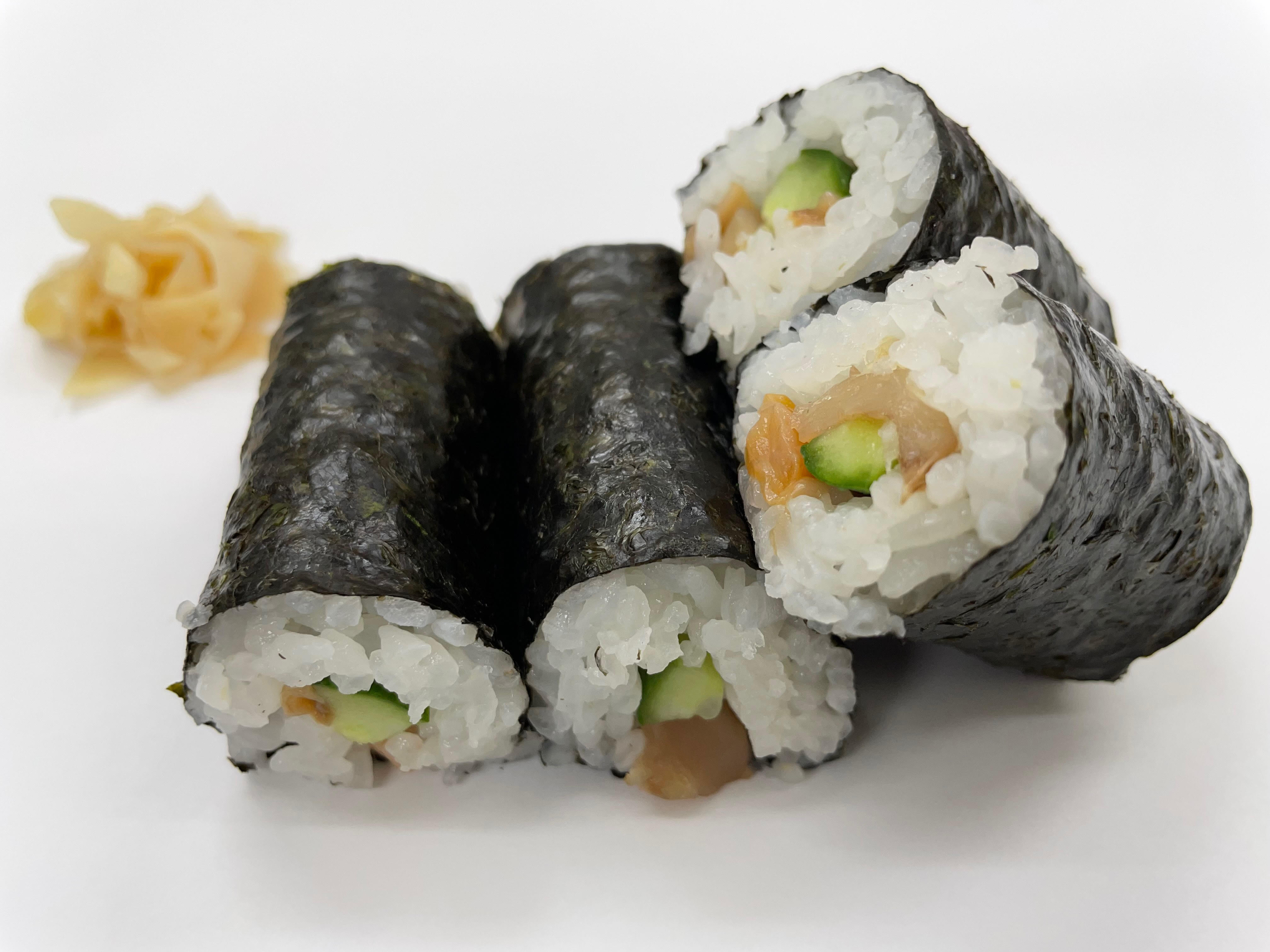
Himokyumaki

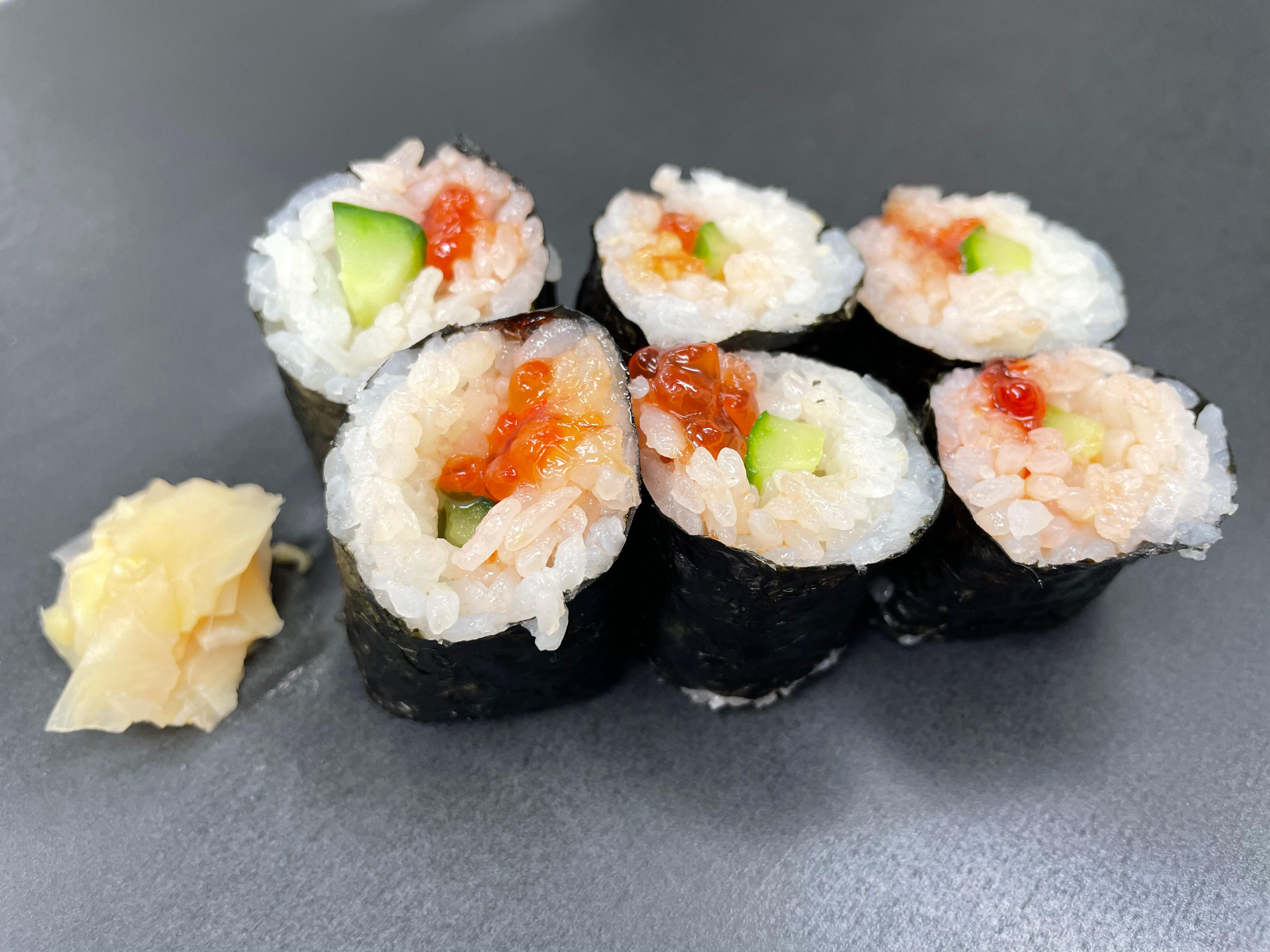
Mambomaki

Anakyumaki (穴きゅう巻き)
Norimaki with anago (whitespotted conger) and kyuri (cucumber).
Himokyumaki (紐きゅう巻き)
In the sushi industry, the mantle of red clams is called a himo (twine). Himokyumaki is a norimaki with himo and kyuri.
Unakyumaki (うなきゅう巻き)
Norimaki with unagi (Japanese eel Kabayaki) and kyuri.
Harasumaki (ハラス巻き)
Norimaki with harasu (Salmon abdomen sashimi) and kyuri.
Mambomaki (マンボ巻き)
Norimaki with sujiko (Salmon ovaries) and kyuri. The origin of the name is said to be that the red and green colors evoke the costumes of the Mambo, a Cuban musical dance popular in Japan at the time, but there are various theories.

== In popular culture ==
The title of the American animated TV series Kappa Mikey is a pun on the food kappamaki and the mythical kappa, both of which are part of the show's many references to Japanese culture.

== See also ==
- Cucumber
- Sushi
- Norimaki
- Alcindo Sartori
