= Irregardless =

Controversial English word

Irregardless is a word sometimes used in place of regardless or irrespective, which has caused controversy since the early twentieth century, though the word appeared in print as early as 1795. The word is mostly known for being controversial and often proscribed, and is often mentioned in discussions on prescriptive and descriptive lexicography.

== Origin ==
The origin of irregardless is unknown, but speculation among dictionary references suggests it is a blend, or portmanteau word, of the standard English words irrespective and regardless. The blend creates a word with a meaning not predictable from the meanings of its constituent morphemes. Since the prefix ir- means "not" (as it does with irrespective), and the suffix -less means "without", the word contains a double negative. The word irregardless could therefore be expected to have the meaning "in regard to", thus being the opposite of regardless. In reality, irregardless is used as a synonym of regardless.

According to the Oxford English Dictionary (OED), irregardless was first acknowledged in 1912 by the Wentworth American Dialect Dictionary as originating from western Indiana, though the word was in use in South Carolina before Indiana became a territory. The usage dispute over irregardless was such that in 1923 Literary Digest published an article titled "Is There Such a Word as Irregardless in the English Language?" The OED goes on to explain the word is primarily a North American colloquialism.

== Appearance in reference books ==
The progress of and sentiments toward irregardless can be studied through its description in references throughout the twentieth century. Webster's New International Dictionary (2nd. ed. unabridged, 1934) described the word as an erroneous or humorous form of regardless, attributing it to the United States. Although irregardless had spread to the American lexicon, it was not universally recognized and was missing completely from Fowler's Modern English Usage, published in 1965, neither was irregardless mentioned under the entry for regardless. In the last twenty-five years, irregardless has become a common entry in dictionaries and usage reference books, although commonly marked as substandard or dialect. It appears in a wide range of dictionaries including Webster's Third New International Dictionary of the English Language Unabridged (1961, repr. 2002), The Barnhart Dictionary of Etymology (1988), The American Heritage Dictionary (Second College Edition, 1991), Microsoft Encarta College Dictionary (2001), and Webster's New World College Dictionary (Fourth Edition, 2004). The definition in most dictionaries is simply listed as regardless (along with the note nonstandard, or similar). Merriam–Webster even states, "Use regardless instead." The Chicago Manual of Style calls irregardless "[a]n error" and instructs writers to "[u]se regardless (or possibly irrespective)."

Australian linguist Pam Peters (The Cambridge Guide to English Usage, 2004) suggests that irregardless has become fetishized because natural examples of this word in corpora of written and spoken English are greatly outnumbered by examples where it is in fact only cited as an incorrect term.

== Prescriptive vs. descriptive ==
The approach taken by lexicographers when documenting a word's uses and limitations can be prescriptive or descriptive. The method used with irregardless is overwhelmingly prescriptive. Much of the criticism comes from the double negative pairing of the prefix (ir-) and suffix (-less), which stands in contrast to the negative polarity exhibited by most standard varieties of English. Critics also use the argument that irregardless is not – or should not be – a word at all, because it lacks the antecedents of a "bona fide nonstandard word." A counterexample is provided in ain't, which has an "ancient genealogy" at which scholars have not leveled such criticisms.

English professor Anne Curzan, writing for The Wall Street Journal, in an article discussing the word, said that objection to irregardless "taps into some deep-seated feelings about language".
