= May you live in interesting times =

Apocryphal purported Chinese curse

"May you live in interesting times" is an English expression that is claimed to be a translation of a traditional Chinese curse. The expression is ironic: "interesting" times are usually times of trouble.

Despite being so common in English as to be known as the "Chinese curse", the saying is apocryphal, and no actual Chinese source has ever been produced. The most likely connection to Chinese culture may be deduced from analysis of the late-19th-century speeches of Joseph Chamberlain, probably erroneously transmitted and revised through his son Austen Chamberlain.

== Origins ==
Despite the phrase being widely attributed as a Chinese curse, there is no known equivalent expression in Chinese. The nearest related Chinese expression translates as "Better to be a dog in times of tranquility than a human in times of chaos." (寧為太平犬，不做亂世人) The expression originates from Volume 3 of the 1627 short story collection by Feng Menglong, Stories to Awaken the World.

Evidence that the phrase was in use as early as 1936 is provided in a memoir written by Hughe Knatchbull-Hugessen, the British Ambassador to China in 1936 and 1937, and published in 1949. He mentions that before he left England for China in 1936, a friend told him of a Chinese curse, "May you live in interesting times."

Frederic René Coudert Jr. also recounted having first heard the phrase in 1936:

Some years ago, in 1936, I had to write to a very dear and honoured friend of mine, who has since died, Sir Austen Chamberlain, brother of the present Prime Minister, and I concluded my letter with a rather banal remark "that we were living in an interesting age". Evidently he read the whole letter, because by return mail he wrote to me and concluded as follows: "Many years ago I learned from one of our diplomats in China that one of the principal Chinese curses heaped upon an enemy is, 'May you live in an interesting age.'" "Surely", he said, "no age has been more fraught with insecurity than our own present time." That was three years ago.

The phrase is again described as a "Chinese curse" in an article published in Child Study: A Journal of Parent Education in 1943.

Research by philologist Garson O'Toole shows a probable origin in the mind of Austen Chamberlain's father Joseph Chamberlain dating around the late-19th and early-20th centuries. Specifically, O'Toole cites the following statement Joseph made during a speech in 1898:

I think that you will all agree that we are living in most interesting times. (Hear, hear.) I never remember myself a time in which our history was so full, in which day by day brought us new objects of interest, and, let me say also, new objects for anxiety. (Hear, hear.) [emphasis added]

Over time, the Chamberlain family may have come to believe that the elder Chamberlain had not used his own phrase, but had repeated a phrase from Chinese.

== Use ==
This phrase was used as a title for the 2019 edition of the Venice Biennale exhibition.

== See also ==
- Chinese word for "crisis"
- Interesting Times, a Terry Pratchett novel
