= Chinese word for crisis =

Linguistic misconception

Crisis
- Traditional Chinese: 危機
- Simplified Chinese: 危机
- Hanyu Pinyin: wēijī (Mainland); wéijī (Taiwan)
Transcriptions
Standard Mandarin
- Hanyu Pinyin: wēijī (Mainland); wéijī (Taiwan)
- Bopomofo: ㄨㄟ ㄐㄧ (Mainland); ㄨㄟˊ ㄐㄧ (Taiwan)
- Gwoyeu Romatzyh: ueiji (Mainland); weiji (Taiwan)
- Wade–Giles: wei^{1}-chi^{1} (Mainland); wei^{2}-chi^{1} (Taiwan)

In Western popular culture, the Chinese word for crisis (simplified Chinese: 危机; traditional Chinese: 危機; pinyin: wēijī, wéijī) is often incorrectly said to comprise two Chinese characters meaning 'danger' (wēi, 危) and 'opportunity' (jī, 机; 機). The second character is a component of the Chinese word for opportunity (jīhuì, 机会; 機會), but has multiple meanings, and in isolation means something more like 'change point' or inflection point. The mistaken etymology became a trope after it was used by John F. Kennedy in his presidential campaign speeches and has been widely repeated in business, education, politics and the press in the United States.

== Origins ==
Sinologist Victor H. Mair of the University of Pennsylvania stated that the popular interpretation of weiji as "danger" plus "opportunity" is a "widespread public misperception" in the English-speaking world. The first character wēi (危) does indeed mean "dangerous" or "precarious", but the second character jī (机; 機) is highly polysemous. It is argued that jī does not mean "opportunity" in this case, but something more like "change point". The confusion likely arises from the fact that the character for jī is a component of the Chinese word for "opportunity", jīhuì (机会; 機會).

== History ==
American linguist Benjamin Zimmer has traced mentions in English of the Chinese term for crisis as far as an anonymous editorial in a 1938 journal for missionaries in China. The American public intellectual Lewis Mumford contributed to the spread of this idea in 1944 when he wrote: "The Chinese symbol for crisis is composed of two elements: one signifies danger and the other opportunity." However, its use likely gained momentum in the United States after John F. Kennedy employed this trope in presidential campaign speeches in 1959 and 1960, possibly paraphrasing Mumford: "In the Chinese language, the word "crisis" is composed of two characters, one representing danger and the other, opportunity."

The word has since become a staple meme for American business consultants and motivational speakers, as well as gaining popularity in educational institutions, politics and the popular press. For example, in 2007, Secretary of State Condoleezza Rice applied it during Middle East peace talks. Former Vice President Al Gore has done so numerous times, such as in testimony before the U.S. House of Representatives, in the introduction of An Inconvenient Truth, and in his Nobel Peace Prize acceptance lecture.

Benjamin Zimmer attributes the appeal of this anecdote to its "handiness" as a rhetorical device and optimistic "call to action", as well as to "wishful thinking".

== See also ==
- May you live in interesting times
