= Stork Tower =

Ancient monument in China

- 鹳雀楼
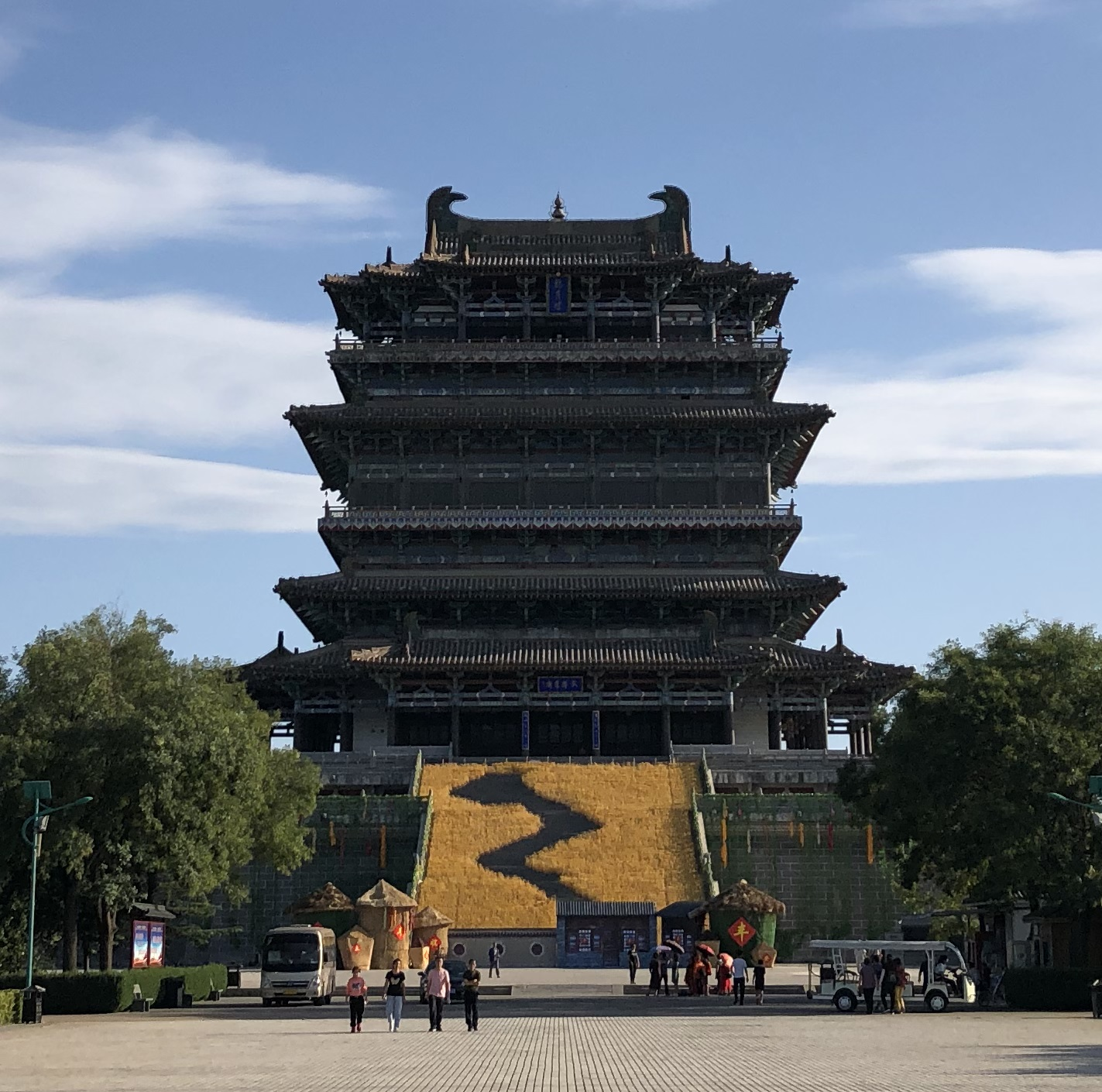
- Stork Tower, in 2020

- Location within Shanxi

General information
- Type: Tower
- Location: Puzhou, Yongji, Shanxi, China
- Coordinates: 34°50′55″N 110°16′36″E
- Opened: 26 September 2002
- Renovated: 31 December 2000

Height
- Height: 73.9-metre (242 ft)

Technical details
- Material: Brick and wood
- Floor area: 33,206-square-metre (357,430 sq ft)

Design and construction
- Architects: Zheng Xiaoxie; Luo Zhewen
- Known for: "On the Stork Tower" by Tang poet Wang Zhihuan

The Stork Tower or Guanque Tower (simplified Chinese: 鹳雀楼; traditional Chinese: 鸛雀樓; pinyin: Guànquè Lóu) is an ancient Chinese tower in Puzhou Town, Yongji, Shanxi, China. It was located in the southwest outside the Puzhou ancient city, and near to the Pujin Ferry (蒲津渡). The Stork Tower had reached unprecedented heyday in the Tang dynasty (618-907) due to an eternally famous poem "On the Stork Tower" (《登鹳雀楼》) written by poet Wang Zhihuan (688-742). Alongside the Pavilion of Prince Teng, Yueyang Tower and Yellow Crane Tower, it is one of the Four Great Towers of China.

== Location ==
Located in the juncture of Shanxi, Shaanxi and Henan, it has been an important traffic fort since ancient times. Yongji City, backing to the Zhongtiao Mountains and facing the Yellow River, is called Puzhou (蒲州) historically. Now, the site of Puzhou ancient city still exists. The thick city walls and tall gate towers are showing the prosperity of Puzhou City back then. Puzhou Ferry (蒲津渡) is built outside the west gate of the Puzhou City. Four burly iron bulls and iron human statues in different folk costumes were once tightly tied to Pujin Floating Bridge (蒲津浮桥) across the Yellow River.

== History ==
=== Northern Zhou dynasty (557–581) ===
According to the historical records, the Stork Tower was first built in the Northern and Southern dynasties (420-589) by Yuwen Hu (513-572), a powerful minister of the Northern Zhou dynasty (557-581). Arrogating all powers to himself, Yuwen Hu presided over state affairs of the Northern Zhou dynasty for over ten years. During his reign, he went in for large-scale construction to build many palaces and towers. Back then, Puzhou was the only way from Chang'an, the capital of the Northern Zhou dynasty, to Jinyang, the political center of the neighboring state Northern Qi dynasty (550-577). Guarding Puzhou, Yuwen Hu had Puzhou city reinforced to make it impregnable. Meanwhile, in order to keep a lookout for the enemy's situation, he also had a three-story tower built outside the city. It's said that after the tower was built, storks often perched on the tower, so it was named the Stork Tower. Some people say that Yuwen Hu had the Stork Tower built for not only military purposes, but also watching his mother by looking into the distance. It turned out that Yuwen Hu's mother was detained in Jinyang, today's Taiyuan in Shanxi, by the Northern Qi dynasty, a neighboring state of the Northern Zhou dynasty. The emperor of the Northern Qi dynasty asked Yuwen Hu's mother to write a letter with the clothes Yuwen Hu wore in childhood attached. After receiving the letter and clothes from his mother, he felt deeply sad and immediately wrote a letter back to his mother. Afterwards, he always kept up regular correspondence with his mother. It's said that Yuwen Hu often ascended the Stork Tower and overlooked the direction to Jinyang to ease his longing for his mother. In AD 572, Yuwen Hu was killed. Yuwen Yong (543-578), the emperor of the Northern Zhou dynasty, advocated frugality, so he had all gorgeous buildings built by Yuwen Hu destroyed by fire. Fortunately, the Stork Tower was preserved because of its military function of keeping a lookout for the border.

=== Tang dynasty (618–907) ===
The Stork Tower was built in the Northern Zhou dynasty and became prosperous in the Tang dynasty (618-907). Around in AD 704, Wang Zhihuan (688-742), a poet of the Tang dynasty, ascended the Stork Tower at dusk one day and wrote an eternally famous poem "On the Stork Tower" (《登鹳雀楼》). From then on, the Stork Tower became well known in the world. Countless people were attracted here by its reputation. Hezhong Prefecture (河中郡) refers to Puzhou. In the 8th year of the Kaiyuan period of the Tang dynasty, namely in AD 720, Puzhou was upgraded to a prefecture and gained the name Hezhong Prefecture as it located in the midstream of the Yellow River.

=== Jin dynasty (1115–1234) ===
In the Zhenyou period of Jin dynasty (1115-1234), Emperor Xuanzong of Jin, Wanyan Xun (1163-1224), deeply felt the great threat from the Mongolian army and decided to move the capital to Hezhong Prefecture, also Puzhou, which was easy to guard but hard to attack. However, due to slow action, shortly after he decided to move the capital, the Mongolian army had occupied Pingyang, today's Linfen in Shanxi province. Puzhou became an isolated city. Emperor Xuanzong of Jin decided to abandon it. He ordered Aludai (阿禄带), the garrison general of Puzhou, to set fire to Puzhou city. According to the records of "Prefecture Annals of Puzhou" (《蒲州府志》), in the first year of the Yuanguang period of Jin dynasty, namely in 1222, the Jin army fought against the Mongolian army, Hou Xiaoshu (侯小叔), the general of Jin army, set fire to the Stork Tower. But "History of Jin" (《金史》) denied this view.

=== Yuan dynasty (1271–1368) ===
Early in the 13th century, Mongolian tribes led by Genghis Khan (1162-1227) developed rapidly, extremely threatening the Jin dynasty (1115-1234). When attacking the Central Plains, the Mongolian cavalry fought with the Jin army fiercely. It is said that the Stork Tower was probably destroyed in the battle for the control of Puzhou between both sides.

In the Yuan dynasty, when the famous scholar Wang Yun (王恽; 1227–1304) came to the Stork Tower, he only saw the ruined base site of the Stork Tower. In the Yuan dynasty, people only saw the ruined base site, not the high-rise tower when visiting the Stork Tower.

=== Ming dynasty (1368–1644) ===
In the Ming dynasty (1368-1644), even the site of the Stork Tower couldn't be seen. In the Longqing period of the Ming dynasty, the Yellow River was breached. The river water flowed backward into Puzhou city and the site of Stork Tower was deeply buried in the sediment from then on.

=== Modern era ===
In 1990s, relevant departments decided to rebuild the Stork Tower. However, when browsing the historical material, people didn't find many records about the Stork Tower. And its exterior specification and structural features weren't narrated very clearly in the ancient documents.

In March 1992, the relevant departments investigated the three towers south of the Yangtze River, back then, they spent ten days visiting five provinces and four cities with a distance of 8,000-kilometre (5,000 mi). They first visited Yellow Crane Tower, then Yueyang Tower, Pavilion of Prince Teng and Xunyang Tower in Jiujiang. When relevant departments visited each of these four towers, they should have a detailed discussion with the chief engineer of the construction unite to investigate and learn the reconstruction of ancient buildings, especially the reconstruction of high towers and pavilions, including their historical background, design basis, architectural styles and management in a detailed way, thus laying a solid foundation for the reconstruction of the Stork Tower. As the changes of old courses and sediment deposition of the Yellow River, experts decided to settle the site of the rebuilt Stork Tower on the shore of the Yellow River 3-kilometre (1.9 mi) away from the Puzhou ancient city. Therefore, experts designed it according to the architecture form of the Tang dynasty (618-907), this time, experts also visited Shaanxi and Gansu from afar to look for train of thought from the imperial tombs of the Tang dynasty (618-907) and the Dunhuang grotto murals. What was worth mentioning was that, as the Stork Tower was very important historically, Chinese ancient architecture experts Zheng Xiaoxie (郑孝燮; 1916–2017) and Luo Zhewen (罗哲文; 1924–2012) always paid great attention to the reconstruction of the Stork Tower. They carefully and thoroughly examined and approved of the design schemes and finally decided to take the second one of the four schemes as the criterion and put forward amendment opinions. The color decoration of Stork Tower was designed by Ma Ruitian (马瑞田), a Chinese color painting expert of ancient architecture. More importantly, currently, the imitation color painting of the Tang dynasty (618-907) is very rare in China. The color decoration of the Stork Tower is a classical work among them. With joint efforts of many ancient architectural experts and constructors, the reconstructed Stork Tower finally showed up in front of people. Experts say that the famous towers represent a kind of emotion and the culture of famous towers is an important carrier of Chinese culture, as well as the bridge and link connecting the feelings for homeland of all Chinese in the world.

== Architecture ==
The Stork Tower, has a total height of 73.9-metre (242 ft), which is equivalent to the height of a building with over 20 stories now, being a typical Tang-style stories building with a high base (唐式高台楼阁建筑). With three stories and four eaves, it has a circle corridor on the first floor and four backrooms. With a protruding corridor on the waist eaves, it also has a hipped roof. The inside layout and beautiful colored decoration both contain the style of the Tang dynasty (618-907).

The present Stork Tower isn't located beside the Puzhou ancient city, but is about 3-kilometre (1.9 mi) away from it. The tower is rebuilt, majestic and splendid, it sets off green trees and facing the rising sun, looking loftier.

== Literature ==
The Tang-era poet Wang Zhihuan (688-742) wrote a famous poem "On the Stork Tower" (《登鹳雀楼》) that helped to immortalize the tower.

白日依山尽，
黄河入海流。
欲穷千里目，
更上一层楼。

The white day sinks behind the mountains,
The Yellow River flows into the sea,
If you want to reach a thousand-mile view,
Just climb up one storey more.

Shen Kuo (1031-1095), an eminent scholar of Northern Song dynasty (960-1127), described the prosperity of the Stork Tower bin his book "Dream Pool Essays" (夢溪筆談): The three-story Stork Tower in Hezhong Prefecture, faces the Zhongtiao Mountains and overlooks the Yellow River. Many people of the Tang dynasty left poems here. However, only the poems of Li Yi (746/748–827/829), Wang Zhihuan (688-742) and Chang Zhu (暢諸) can vividly describe the scenery of it.

The Stork Tower appeared in the traditional Chinese painting "Painting of the Prosperous Middle Capital Puban" (《中都蒲坂繁盛图》).
