= Guishan =

Guishan may refer to:

== Mainland China ==
- Guishan Guanyin of the Thousand Hands and Eyes (沩山千手千眼观音圣像), colossal Buddha statue in Changsha
- Guishan TV Tower, also known as Tortoise Mountain TV Tower, in Wuhan
- Dong Guishan (董贵山), lieutenant general in the People's Liberation Army (PLA)
- Guishan, Guangdong (桂山镇), town in Xiangzhou District, Zhuhai
- Guishan, Macheng (龟山镇), town in Macheng, Huanggang, Hubei
- Guishan Township, Zhejiang (皈山乡), in Anji County
- Guishan Subdistrict (桂山街道), Xinping Yi and Dai Autonomous County, Yunnan

== Taiwan ==
- Guishan Island (龜山島), island of Yilan County off the northeastern coast of Taiwan
- Guishan District (龜山區), district in Taoyuan, Taiwan

== People ==
- Guishan Lingyou (771–853 CE), a Chinese Buddhist monk of the Tang dynasty
