= Four Great Towers of China =

Four towers in China

The Four Great Towers of China (Chinese: 中国四大名楼) are four historically renowned towers in China. The list usually includes the following:

- Yellow Crane Tower (黄鹤楼), Wuhan, Hubei province - (30°32′49″N 114°17′49″E)
- Pavilion of Prince Teng (滕王阁), Nanchang, Jiangxi Province - (28°41′2.76″N 115°52′32.88″E)
- Yueyang Tower (岳阳楼), Yueyang, Hunan Province - (29.384723°N 113.088262°E)
- Penglai Pagoda (蓬莱阁), Yantai, Shandong Province - 37.82613°N 120.74966°E)

The first three towers are not disputable. However, Penglai Pagoda is often excluded in favour of Stork Tower (鹳雀楼), situated in Shanxi. This is in order to have a list where all four towers are linked to famous pieces of literature, as follows:

- Yellow Crane Tower: Yellow Crane Tower by Cui Hao
- Pavilion of Prince Teng: Tengwang Ge Xu (Preface to a Poem on the Pavilion of Prince Teng), by Wang Bo
- Yueyang Tower: Memorial to Yueyang Tower, by Fan Zhongyan
- Stork Tower: Ascending Guanque Tower, by Wang Zhihuan

Also, Yuewang Tower (Tower of Prince Yue, 越王楼), situated in Mianyang, Sichuan Province, is also considered to be one of the Four Great Towers. Yuewang Tower is linked with more than 100 pieces of literature, and the most famous one is:

- Yuewang Tower: Ascending Tower by Li Bai

The Three Great Towers of Jiangnan (江南三大樓) excludes both Penglai Pagoda and Stork Tower, which are in northern China, and only includes:

- Yellow Crane Tower (Hubei, on the southern bank of the Yangtze River)
- Pavilion of Prince Teng (Jiangxi)
- Yueyang Tower (Hunan)
