= Wang Changling =

Tang dynasty politician in China

- 王昌齡
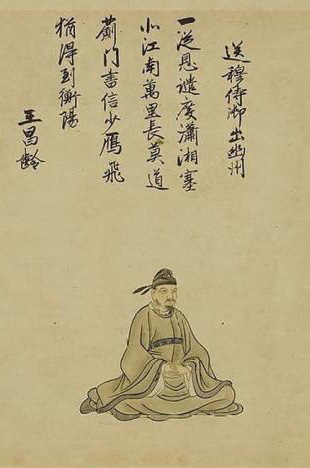
- Wang Changling, painted by Kanō Tsunenobu in the 18th century.
- Born: 698; Taiyuan, Shanxi, China
- Died: 756 (aged 57–58); Bozhou, Anhui, China
- Occupation: Poet

Chinese name
- Chinese: 王昌齡
Transcriptions
Standard Mandarin
- Hanyu Pinyin: Wáng Chānglíng

Shaobo
- Chinese: 少伯
Transcriptions
Standard Mandarin
- Hanyu Pinyin: Shàobó

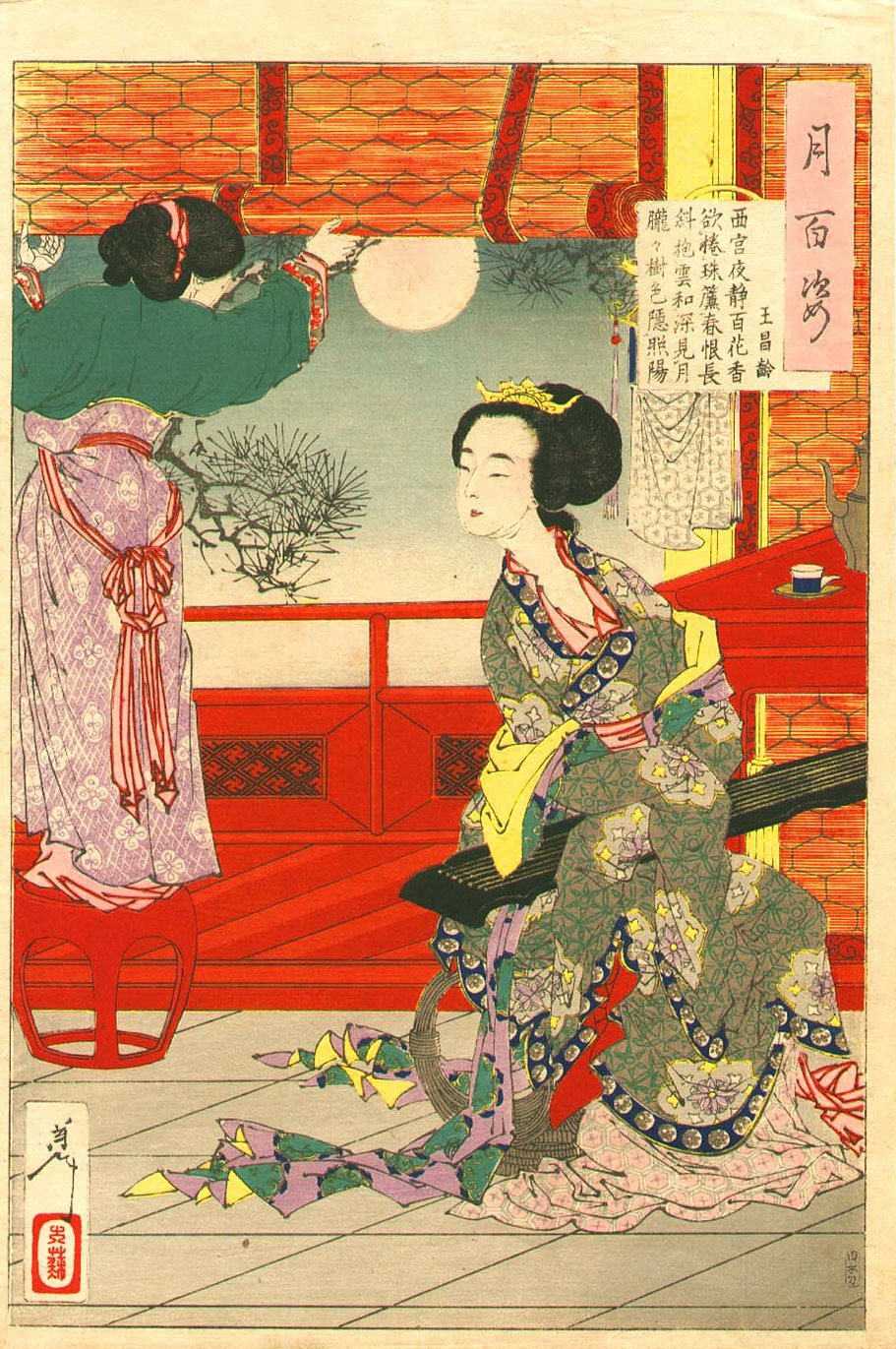
Yoshitoshi illustrating one of Wang Changling's poems, 100 Aspects of the Moon #54, 1887.

Wang Changling (Chinese: 王昌齡; pinyin: Wáng Chānglíng; 698–756) was a major Tang dynasty poet. His courtesy name was Shaobo (少伯). He was originally from Taiyuan in present-day Shanxi province, according to the editors of the Three Hundred Tang Poems, although other sources claim that he was actually from Jiangning near modern-day Nanjing. After passing the prestigious jinshi examination, he became a secretarial official and later held other imperial positions, including that of an official posting to Sishui (汜水), in what is currently Xingyang, in Henan province. Near the end of his life he was appointed as a minister of Jiangning county. He died in the An Lushan Rebellion; between the 10th month of the 14th year of the Tianbao era (755 CE) and the second year of the Zhide era (757 CE), he was executed by the Tang official Lü Qiuxiao (閭丘曉). When Lüqiu later was sentenced to death by another official Zhang Hao (張鎬), he pleaded for mercy, citing the fact that he had kin to take care of. Zhang's retort was, "Then, who's left to take care of Wang Changling's kin?". Lüqiu went silent after that.

He is best known for his poems describing fictional battles in the frontier regions of western China. He also wrote an homage to the Princess Pingyang, Lady Warrior of the early Tang dynasty. Wang Changling was one of the competitors in the famous wine shop competition along with Gao Shi and Wang Zhihuan.
