= Wuhan Yangtze River Bridge =

Bridge in Hubei, China

Wuhan Yangtze River Bridge 武汉长江大桥
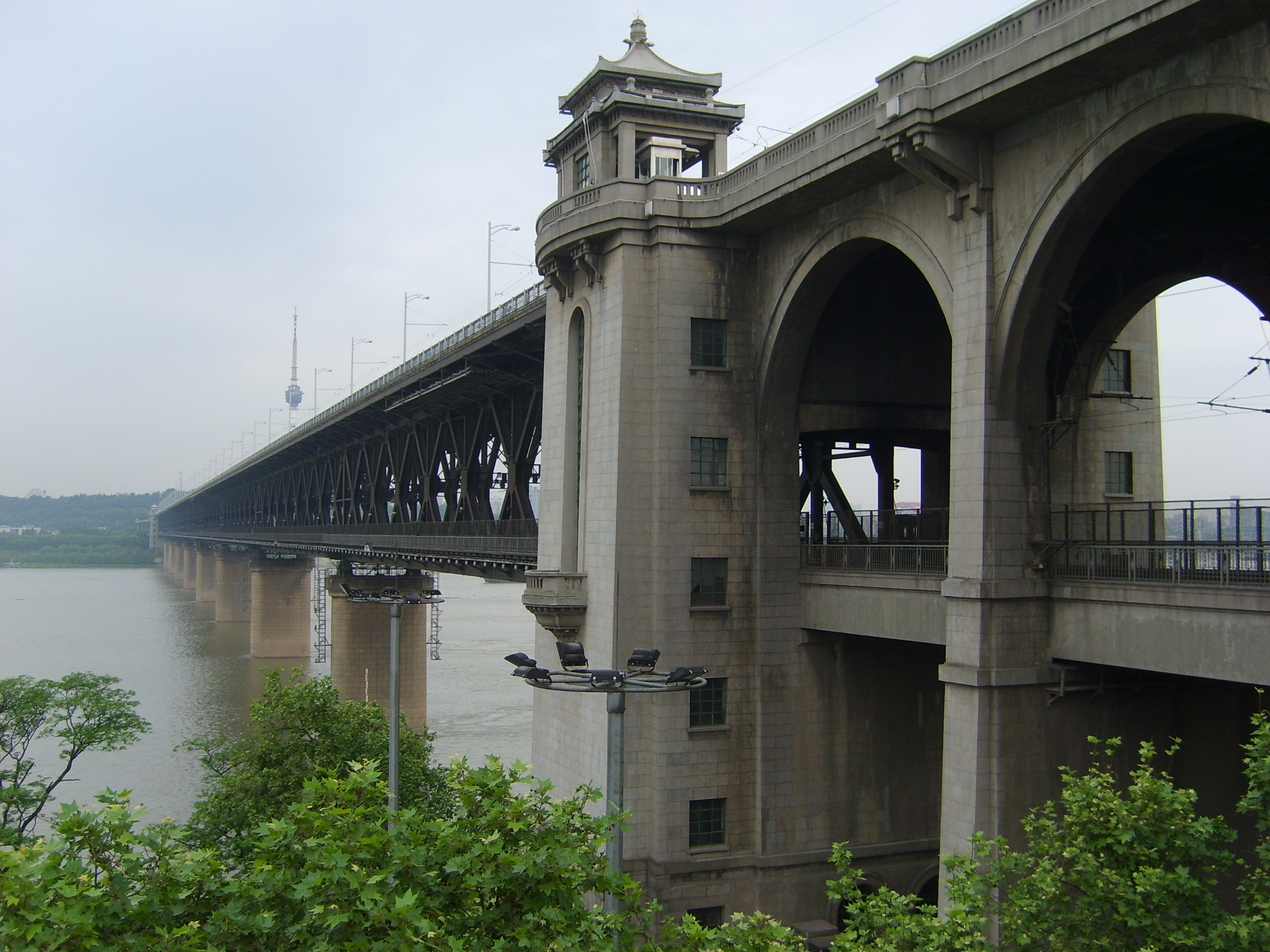
- Coordinates: 30.5497°N 114.2882°E
- Carries: 4 lanes Highway; 2 tracks of the Beijing–Guangzhou Railway
- Crosses: Yangtze River
- Locale: Wuhan, Hubei, China
- Other name: Wuhan Great Bridge

Characteristics
- Design: Truss bridge
- Total length: 1,670 metres (5,480 ft)
- Width: 22.5 metres (74 ft)
- Longest span: 128 metres (420 ft)

History
- Constructed by: Wuhan Great Bridge Engineering Bureau
- Construction start: 1 September 1955
- Construction end: September 1957
- Opened: 15 October 1957

Location
- Interactive map of Wuhan Yangtze River Bridge

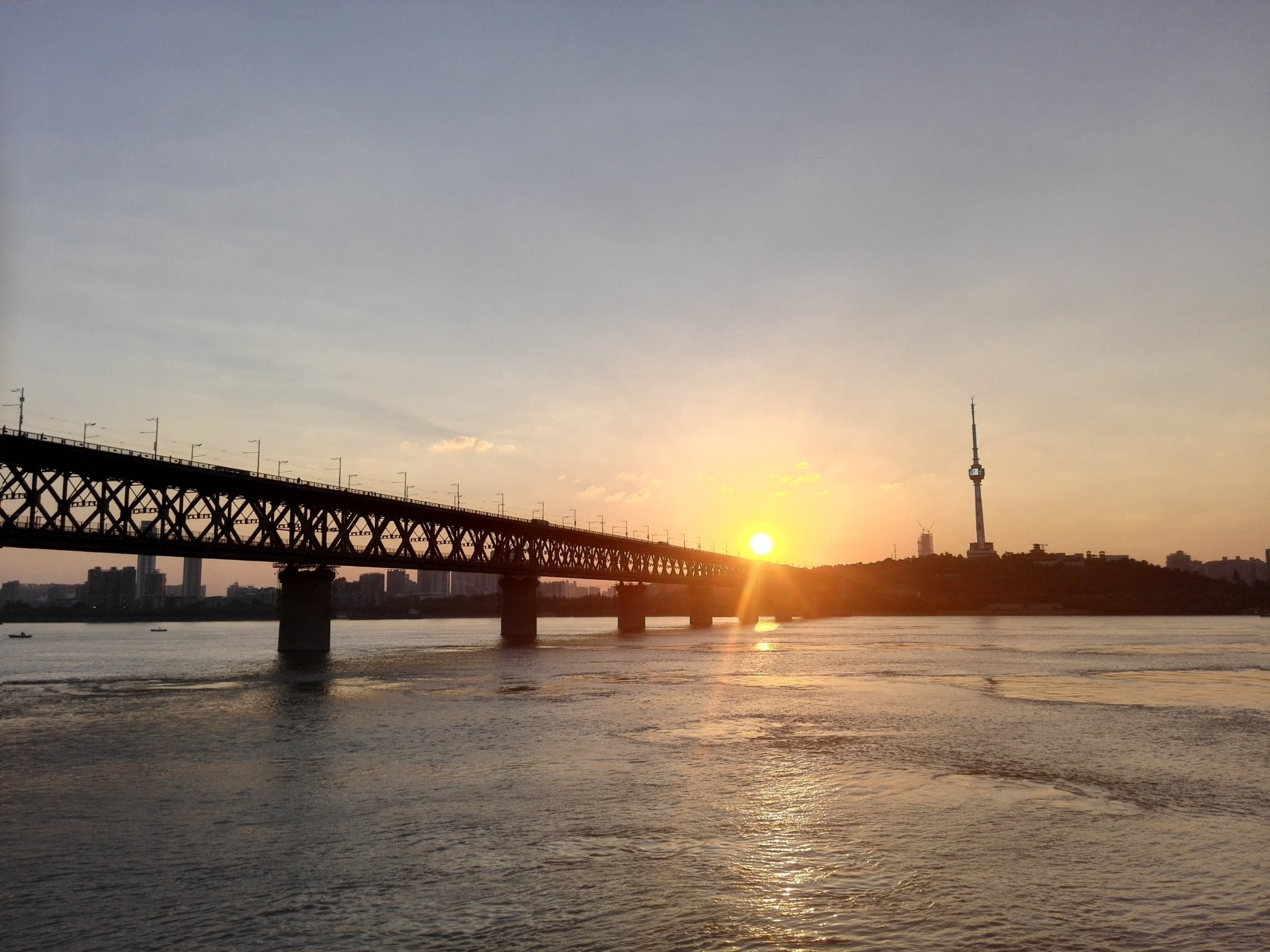
Wuhan Yangtze River Bridge

The Wuhan Yangtze Great Bridge (simplified Chinese: 武汉长江大桥; traditional Chinese: 武漢長江大橋; pinyin: Wǔhàn Chángjiāng Dàqiáo), commonly known as Wuhan First Yangtze Bridge, is a double-deck road and rail bridge across the Yangtze River in Wuhan, in Central China. At its completion in 1957, the bridge was the easternmost crossing of the Yangtze, and was often referred to as the "First Bridge of the Yangtze".

The bridge extends 1.6 kilometers (1 mile) from Turtle Hill in Hanyang, on the northern bank of the Yangtze, to Snake Hill in Wuchang, on the southern bank of the Yangtze. Plans for the bridge's construction were first made in 1910. A total of four exploratory surveys were made between 1913 and 1948 to identify a suitable site, but economic limitations and the combination of World War II and the Chinese Civil War prevented the bridge's building until the 1950s. Actual construction began in September 1955 and was completed in October 1957.

The upper level of the bridge is a two-way, four-lane automobile highway. The lower level is a double-track railway on the Beijing-Guangzhou railway line.

== History ==
=== Background ===
The Wuhan metropolis is an amalgamation of three cities situated at the confluence of the Han River and the Yangtze: Wuchang, located on the southern bank of the Yangtze, Hanyang, located on the northern bank of the Yangtze and the west bank of the Han, and Hankou, located on the northern bank of the Yangtze and the eastern bank of the Han. Wuhan lies at the heart of Central China and is a hub from transportation between the Central Plain in northern China and the trading ports of Guangzhou and Hong Kong in southern China. The Beijing-Wuhan railway line went into full service in 1906, followed in 1936 by the Wuhan-Guangzhou railway line. Between that time and the bridge's completion in 1957, railway cars travelling between northern and southern China had to be ferried over the Yangtze on barges, a laborious and dangerous practice.

=== Early planning ===
Early formulations of plans for a railway bridge over the Yangtze at Wuhan were put forward by Zhang Zhidong in the late 19th century. In May 1912, railroad engineer Jeme Tien Yow was made head of the Wuhan-Guangzhou railway association by the Beiyang Government. While working on the Wuchang railroad station, Jeme incorporated plans for connection of the Beijing and Guangzhou lines into the railroad's construction.

In 1913, Peking University professor of engineering George Miller brought Xia Changchi (Chinese: 夏昌熾), Li Wenji (Chinese: 李文驥), and 13 other Chinese engineering students to Wuhan to do surveying for a possible bridge location. At the same time, Peking University President Yan Fu submitted the initial proposal for bridge construction to the Department of Transportation. The earliest designs for the bridge were modeled after the Forth Bridge, near Edinburgh, which had been completed in 1890. Although their work never proceeded past the planning phase, the area identified in the 1913 surveys proved to be an excellent site, and is the location where the bridge was eventually built. Wang Yuan Tang also contributed to this work. He was a lead engineer in designing this bridge.

Sun Yat-sen's treatise The International Development of China, published in 1919, emphasized the economic importance of finding a suitable location for building a bridge over or a tunnel under the Yangtze along the Wuhan railway line. At the time, Sun wrote, "There ought to be a tunnel constructed under the first turn of the Yangtze at Wuhan to connect the two banks. Moreover, there ought to be a tunnel or bridge at the mouth of the Han River to link the three cities of Wuchang, Hankou, and Hanyang together into one metropolis." However, contemporary work on the railway bridge over the Yellow River at Zhengzhou sapped China of its limited bridge-building resources.

=== Construction ===
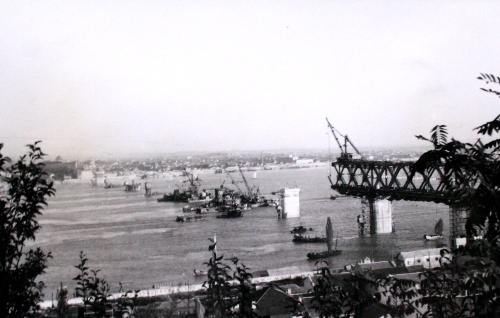
Wuhan Yangtze River Bridge under construction in 1956

In 1949, shortly after the Chinese Communist Party's victory in the Chinese Civil War and its founding of the People's Republic of China, former Peking University engineering student Li Wenji, by then 63 years old, and bridge engineer Mao Yisheng (Chinese: 茅以升) submitted a proposal to the new government for the construction of the Wuhan bridge as "a memorial to the success of the new democratic revolution." Li and the others were invited to the first Chinese People's Political Consultative Conference in September 1949 to participate in discussions on the bridge's construction.

The proposals were accepted, and a bridge committee was created in January 1950. Li was able to participate in the first year of the planning and building work before he became ill and died in August 1951. Between 1950 and 1953, three conferences were held to discuss the plans, designs, and construction of the bridge as they developed. In February 1953, Mao Zedong traveled to Wuhan to receive reports on the project's progress, and was taken to the Yellow Crane Tower to view the proposed bridge site. On 1 April 1953, Zhou Enlai approved the creation of the Wuhan Great Bridge Engineering Bureau, which was responsible for overseeing the design and building of the bridge, with Peng Min (Chinese: 彭敏) as bureau chief and party secretary and Wang Juqian (Chinese: 汪菊潜) as chief engineer.

Chinese engineers in the 1950s were still heavily reliant on Russian expertise on major projects. Between July and September 1953, Chinese engineers brought a large number of the bridge's plans and blueprints to Moscow for consultation with Soviet engineers. In July 1954, the State Council of the People's Republic of China gave approval for a 28-person delegation of Soviet engineers, led by Konstantin Sergeyevich Silin (1913–1996), to travel to China and assist the Chinese with the bridge's design and construction.

Construction officially began on 1 September 1955. Silin had predicted that using pressured-air caissons would be impractical due to the Yangtze's unpredictable water level, which made drilling holes for the bridge's supports much more difficult. The cantilever bridge design was used, and construction proceeded for over two years. Mao Zedong returned to Wuhan on 6 September 1957 to inspect the nearly-completed bridge, and was able to walk from the Hanyang side to the Wuchang side. The bridge formally opened to public traffic on 15 October 1957.

On 20 September 1958, trolleybus route 1, which crosses the Yangtze River using the bridge, officially started operations. It continues to utilize this bridge till today.

On January 31, 2018, Theresa May, Prime Minister of the United Kingdom, visited Wuhan and took pictures on the Wuchang District side of the Yangtze River at the First Yangtze River Bridge.

== See also ==
- Wuhan#Completion and opening-to-traffic of the First Yangtze River Bridge
- Yangtze River bridges and tunnels
- List of bridges in China
