= Gao Shi =

Chinese Tang dynasty poet (704–765)

- 高適
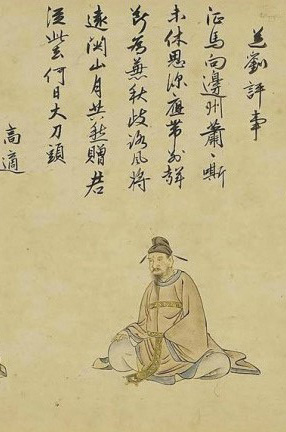
- Gao Shi, painted by Kanō Tsunenobu in the 18th century
- Born: 704; Cangzhou, Hebei, China
- Died: 765 (aged 60–61); Cangzhou, Hebei, China
- Occupation(s): Military general, poet, politician

Chinese name
- Traditional Chinese: 高適
- Simplified Chinese: 高适 (Note: The traditional form "高適" is also used in some books in Simplified Chinese, for the Chinese character 适 may have ambiguous meaning.)
Transcriptions
Standard Mandarin
- Hanyu Pinyin: Gāo Shì
- Wade–Giles: Kao Shih
Yue: Cantonese
- Jyutping: Gou^{1} Sik^{1}

Dafu
- Traditional Chinese: 達夫
- Simplified Chinese: 达夫
Transcriptions
Standard Mandarin
- Hanyu Pinyin: Dáfū

Zhongwu
- Chinese: 仲武
Transcriptions
Standard Mandarin
- Hanyu Pinyin: Zhòngwǔ

Gao Changshi
- Chinese: 高常侍
Transcriptions
Standard Mandarin
- Hanyu Pinyin: Gāo Chángshì

Gao Shi (c. 704 – 765) was a Chinese military general, poet, and politician of the Tang dynasty, two of whose poems were collected in the popular anthology Three Hundred Tang Poems. His courtesy name was Dáfū (達夫).

Born into an impoverished family, Gao eventually became a secretary in the military, enjoying a successful career. His hometown was either in modern Hunan Province or Shandong Province.

Gao Shi was one of the competitors in the famous wine shop competition, along with Wang Zhihuan and Wang Changling.

== Life ==
=== Early years ===
Gao Shi is generally considered to have been born in 704, in Cangzhou(沧州). He spent his childhood in Guangzhou, where his father worked as an officer in Shaozhou(广东韶关). Afterward, Gao Shi traveled around middle and southern China for more than 10 years and moved to Songzhou(宋州). During this time, he failed to find a way to become an official. In 731, Gao Shi moved to Shuofang(朔方) and joined the army. He witnessed the fight with the Khitan people and created many of his masterpieces like "A Song of the Yan Country".

=== Becoming an official ===
After the war, Gao Shi moved back to Songzhou and started another round of traveling. In the next 10 years, Gao Shi met Li Bai, Du Fu, and many other famous poets. In 749, Gao Shi was recommended by Zhang Jiugao(张九皋). He became a county lieutenant in that autumn and visited the frontier as an official for the next 2 years. In the next several years, Gao Shi traveled around the frontier with the army. As the war was going well, Gao Shi kept getting promoted.

=== Success in old age ===
In 755, the An Lushan Rebellion took place. As a secretary in the military, Gao Shi had more chances to meet the emperor and show his talent. After a chain of promotions, Gao Shi finally became the jiedushi of Chengdu.

== Poems ==
One of Gao Shi's poems (as translated by Witter Bynner), appearing in the Tang 300, was "A Song of the Yan Country", referring to the Yan territory of the An and Shi "Yan dynasty", the other being "To Vice-prefects Li and Wang degraded and transferred to Xiazhong and Changsha". He moved back to the capital in 764 and in his last days, he became the deputy minister of the ministry of punishment. On February 17, 765, Gao Shi died in his home in Chang'an.

Gao's farewell poetry – particularly Farewell to Dongda (Chinese: 別董大) – is notable for its optimism and encouragement, contrasting with the "debilitating grief" found in farewell poetry of the era. This optimism was massively influential on the works of Song dynasty poet Li Gonglin, to whom the themes of human agency and potential appealed.
