= An Zhengwen =

Chinese painter

An Zhengwen (Chinese: 安正文; pinyin: Ān Zhèngwén; Wade–Giles: An Cheng-wen); (Date of birth and death unknown) was an imperial Chinese painter during the Ming dynasty (1368–1644).

An was born in Wuxi and was known for painting people, landscapes, and buildings.

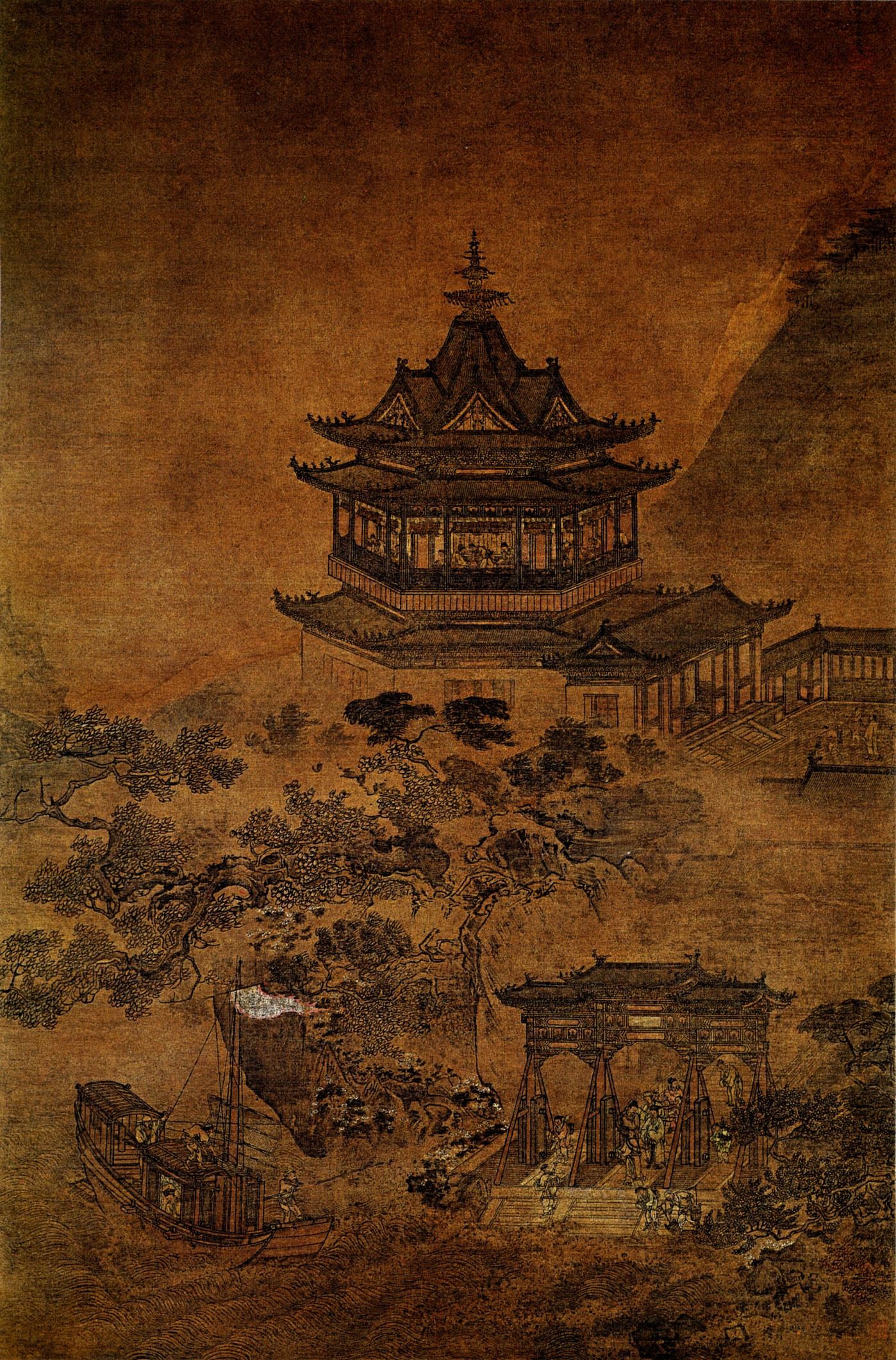
Yueyang Tower

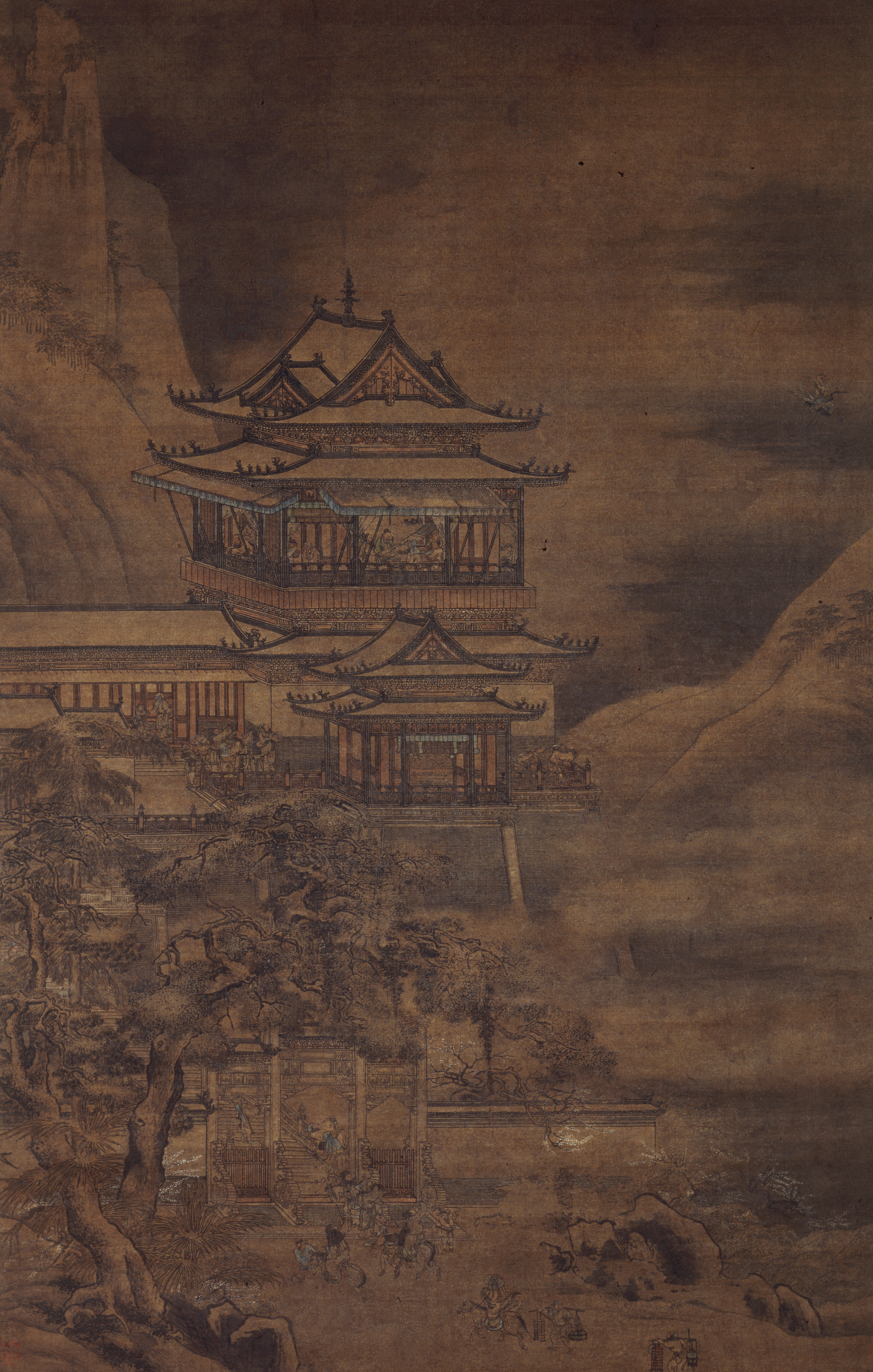
Yellow Crane Tower
