= Wuhan trolleybus route 1 =

Trolleybus route in Wuhan, China

Trolleybus route 1
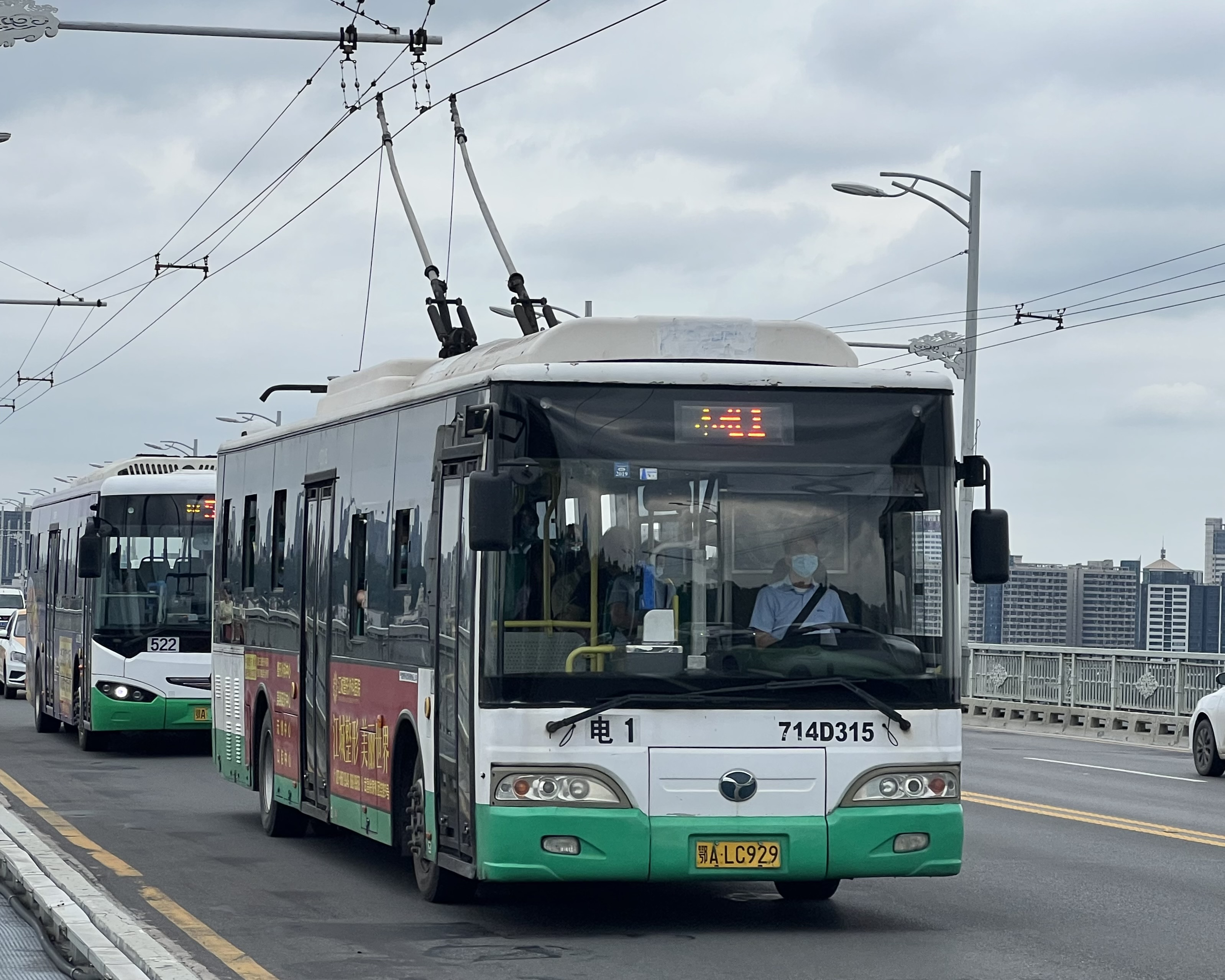
- A Yangtze WG6124BEVH on Wuhan Yangtze River Bridge in May 2023

Overview
- Operator: Wuhan Public Transport Group Trolleybus Operating Company
- Began service: 20 September 1958

Route
- Route type: Trolleybus route
- Start: Jinghan Avenue & Qianjin 1st Road
- Via: Zhongshan Avenue, Jianghan Bridge, Yingwu Avenue, Wuhan Yangtze River Bridge, Wuluo Road
- End: Shuiguohu Road & Shuiguohu

Service
- Level: 06:00-22:30

Trolleybus route 1 is a trolleybus route in Wuhan, China. Operating since 20 September 1958, it is the first bus route in Wuhan to be operated by trolleybuses. The route currently runs between Jinghan Avenue & Qianjin 1st Road (Note: Chinese: 京汉大道前进一路) and Shuiguohu Road & Shuiguohu (Note: Chinese: 水果湖路水果湖) stops, and is operated by Wuhan Public Transport Group Trolleybus Operating Company. (Note: Chinese: 武汉市公交集团电车营运公司)

Planning for the route started in the 1950s, when the construction of a trolleybus system was of major public interest. Construction started in 1957, lasting one year, and test runs began in August 1958. An opening ceremony was held a month later, with attendees ranging from government officials to civilian representatives.

The route passes by several landmarks in the city, including shopping district Hanzheng Street and Wuhan Yangtze River Bridge, and formerly a statue of Sun Yat-sen in Hankou. The route was described as "a specialty of Wuhan" and is particularly memorable to locals.

== Planning ==
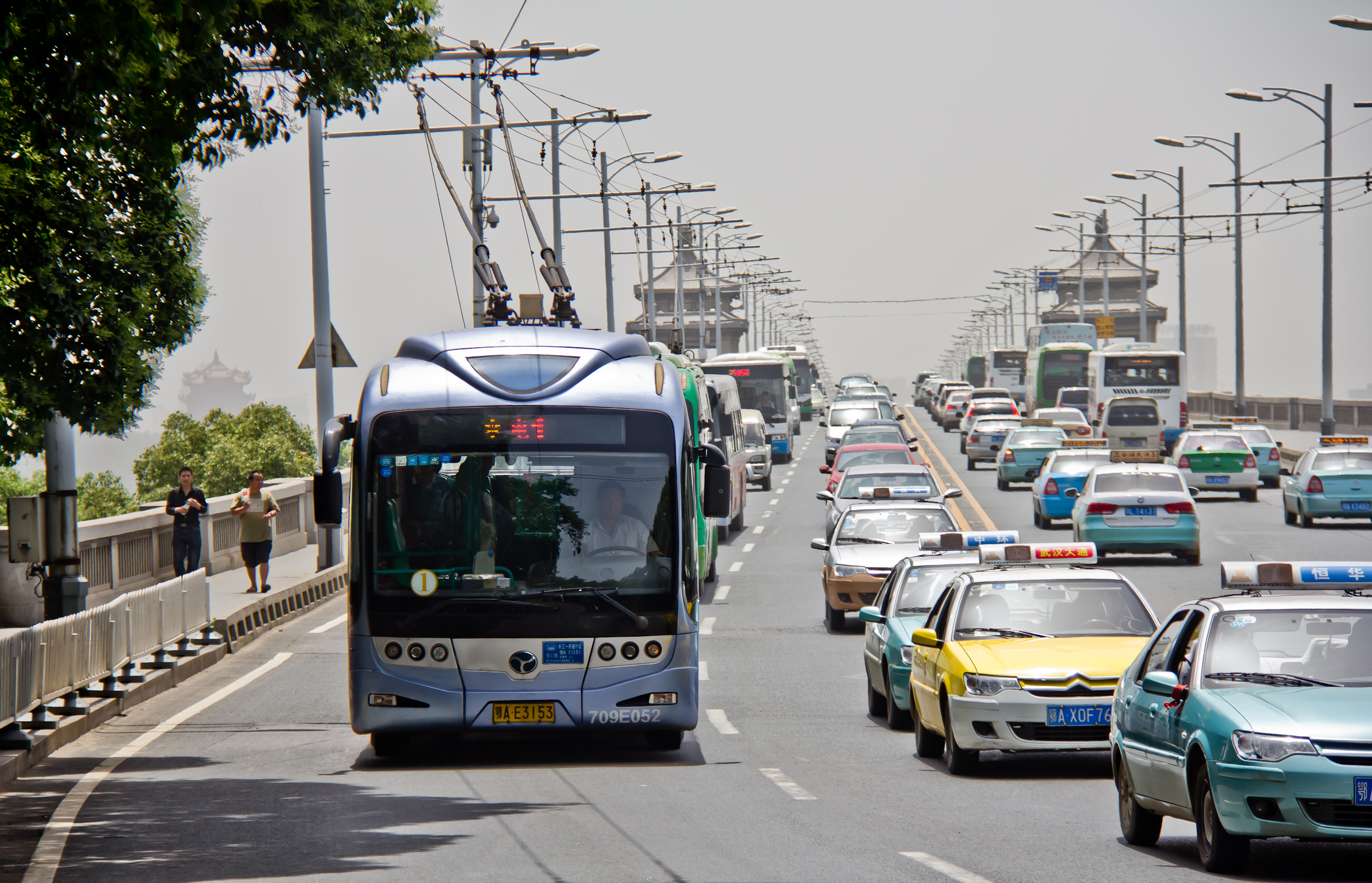
A Yangtze WG6120DHA exiting Wuhan Yangtze River Bridge in 2014

In the 1950s, the main perception of communism among the general public in mainland China refers to "Soviet and electrification" as suggested by Vladimir Lenin. As a result, the topic of trolleybuses was of great public interest. In 1955, Zhou Huanzhang was appointed Director of Wuhan Public Utilities Bureau and started to prepare for the establishment of a trolleybus company.

In 1956, following the establishment of a preparatory office for trolleybus operations, a team of six engineers, after consultation with the construction team of Wuhan Yangtze River Bridge and experts from the Soviet Union, decided to model the network in Wuhan after systems in Soviet cities. Construction works were put off to autumn 1957, after the opening of the bridge.

In March 1958, the design phase of trolleybus route 1 was completed, with the route running between Sanmin Road in Hankou and Dadongmen in Wuchang. Between April and August, construction for various trolleybus facilities and equipment, including power supply rectification stations and a bus park, went underway. Test runs began on 25 August 1958.

== Operations ==
On September 20, 1958, officials of various municipal offices of Wuhan and the trolleybus company held an opening ceremony in front of the headquarters of Wuhan Trolleybus Company on Wusheng Road to announce the establishment of the trolleybus company and the start of operations of trolleybus route 1. A fleet of 25 trolleybuses then departed from the headquarters and split to depart from the two termini. Passengers on the first bus included officials as well as civilian representatives. According to the local newspaper, Changjiang Daily, 30,000 people attended the opening ceremony. The paper also claimed that the opening of trolleybus route 1 was "the start of electrification for Wuhan's public transport industry."

In April 1960, the route was extended and the terminus in Wuchang was replaced by one at Shuiguohu. The original route to Dongdamen remained in operation as a short-trip variant. It would later be split out and become trolleybus route 4 between Qiaokou and Wuchang Railway Station in 1972. In 1980, articulated trolleybuses were introduced on route 1.

In 2015, the fleet of all trolleybus routes in Wuhan, including route 1, was converted to use battery trolleybuses. These buses use overhead wires to charge their batteries, but are able to travel solely on battery power, with their trolley poles lowered, when the battery is fully charged.

The overall route of trolleybus route 1 remained unchanged for over 60 years. On 20 January 2023, the terminus in Hankou was changed to Jinghan Avenue & Qianjin 1st Road.

== Cultural significance ==
Trolleybus route 1 passed by various landmarks, including shopping district Hanzheng Street, Jianghan Bridge and Yangtze River Bridge. When the route first opened, locals and even foreign visitors sought to buy tickets to ride the trolleybus line, with most passengers being tourists or shoppers. The route was described as "a specialty of Wuhan", and "visitors had to ride the route to appreciate the uniqueness of the city."

For nearly 65 years between 1958 and 2023, when the Hankou terminus was located at Sanmin Road, trolleybus route 1 circled around a statue depicting Sun Yat-sen at the end of Sanmin Road while making a turnaround towards Wuchang. As a result, the sight of trolleybuses circling the statue with their poles raised became a fond memory of residents in the area.

== See also ==
- List of trolleybus systems
- Transport in the People's Republic of China
