= Yingying Pagoda =

Pagoda in Shanxi, China

Coordinates: 34.84623°N 110.32800°E

The Yingying Pagoda (Chinese: 莺莺塔; pinyin: Yīng Yīng Tǎ) of Yongji County, Shanxi province, China, is a pagoda whose present structure dates from the Ming dynasty.

== History ==
The pagoda was first established in the Tang dynasty at the same time as the Pujiu temple, which no longer exists. The present-day pagoda dates from 1563 during the Ming dynasty. According to local legend, the designer of the pagoda hid two golden frogs somewhere inside the pagoda. It is popular for visitors to use rocks to knock against the walls in search of hollows where the frogs may be hidden.

== Structure ==
The pagoda is 50 meters tall, and square shaped. It has 13 floors.
