= Hezhong Prefecture =

Historical administrative division in Shanxi, China

- Chinese: 河中府
Transcriptions
Standard Mandarin
- Hanyu Pinyin: Hézhōng Fǔ
- Wade–Giles: Ho^{2}-chung^{1} Fu^{3}

Pu Prefecture
- Chinese: 蒲州
Transcriptions
Standard Mandarin
- Hanyu Pinyin: Pú Zhōu
- Wade–Giles: P'u^{2} Chou^{1}

Puzhou Prefecture
- Chinese: 蒲州府
Transcriptions
Standard Mandarin
- Hanyu Pinyin: Pú Zhōu Fǔ

Puzhou or Pu Prefecture, also known as Hezhong Prefecture between 760 and 1369 (and briefly in 720) and Puzhou Prefecture between 1728 and 1912, was a zhou or fu (prefecture) in Imperial China, centering on modern Yongji, Shanxi. It existed intermittently from 558 until 1912.

== See also ==
- Hedong Commandery
