= Tortoise Mountain TV Tower =

TV Tower in China

Coordinates: 30°33′28.81″N 114°16′30″E

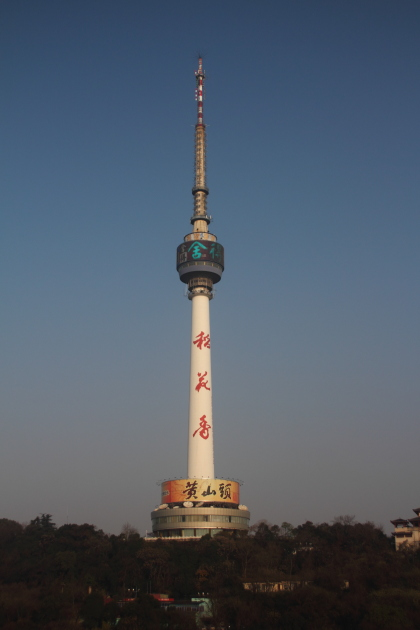
Guishan TV tower

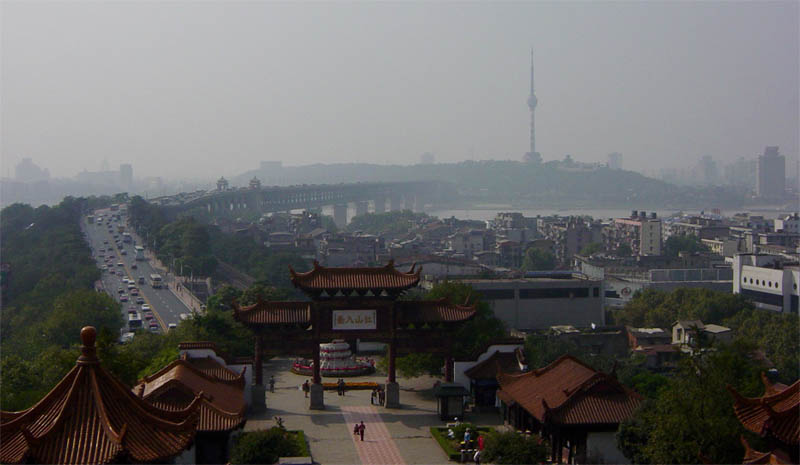
View from the Yellow Crane Pavilion (Huang He Lou Pavilion) on Sheshan Hill, The TV tower is seen in the distance on Guishan Hill on the opposite side of the river

Tortoise Mountain TV Tower (Chinese: 龟山电视塔; pinyin: Guī Shān Diànshì Tǎ) is a 311.4-metre (1,022 ft) high TV Tower in Hanyang District, Wuhan, Hubei, China. It is a concrete tower equipped with an observation deck in a height of 221.2 metres (726 ft). It does not stand directly upon the hill, which is occupied by an ancient temple complex (Qing Chuan Ge (晴川閣) from the Three Kingdoms, Song, and Ming dynasties). Guishan TV Tower is China's first self-developed TV tower, opened in 1986.

The tower is located on Guishan ("Tortoise Mountain" or "Turtle Mountain") on the left (northwestern) bank of the Yangtze river, in the part of Wuhan that was historically known as Hanyang. It is located upon the northwestern shoulder of the mountain, reducing the impact upon the ancient temple set upon the peak, that peak being one of the two famous hills of Wuhan, the other being Sheshan (the Snake Mountain) on the opposite, right bank of the Yangtze, in Wuchang; the ancient Yellow Crane Tower is located there. Both hills have many historic ruins, and rows of sculptures of ancient warriors line the hill.
