= Yellow Crane Tower =

Building in Wuhan of ancient Chinese origin

Coordinates: 30°32′49″N 114°17′49″E

- "Yellow Crane Tower" in Simplified (top) and Traditional (bottom) Chinese characters
- Simplified Chinese: 黄鹤楼
- Traditional Chinese: 黃鶴樓
Transcriptions
Standard Mandarin
- Hanyu Pinyin: Huáng hè lóu
- IPA: [xwǎŋ xɤ̂ lǒʊ]
Yue: Cantonese
- Yale Romanization: Wòhng hohk làuh
- Jyutping: Wong4 hok6 lau4
- IPA: [wɔŋ˩ hɔk̚˨ lɐw˩]
Southern Min
- Tâi-lô: N̂g ho̍h lâu (col.); Hông ho̍k lâu (lit.)

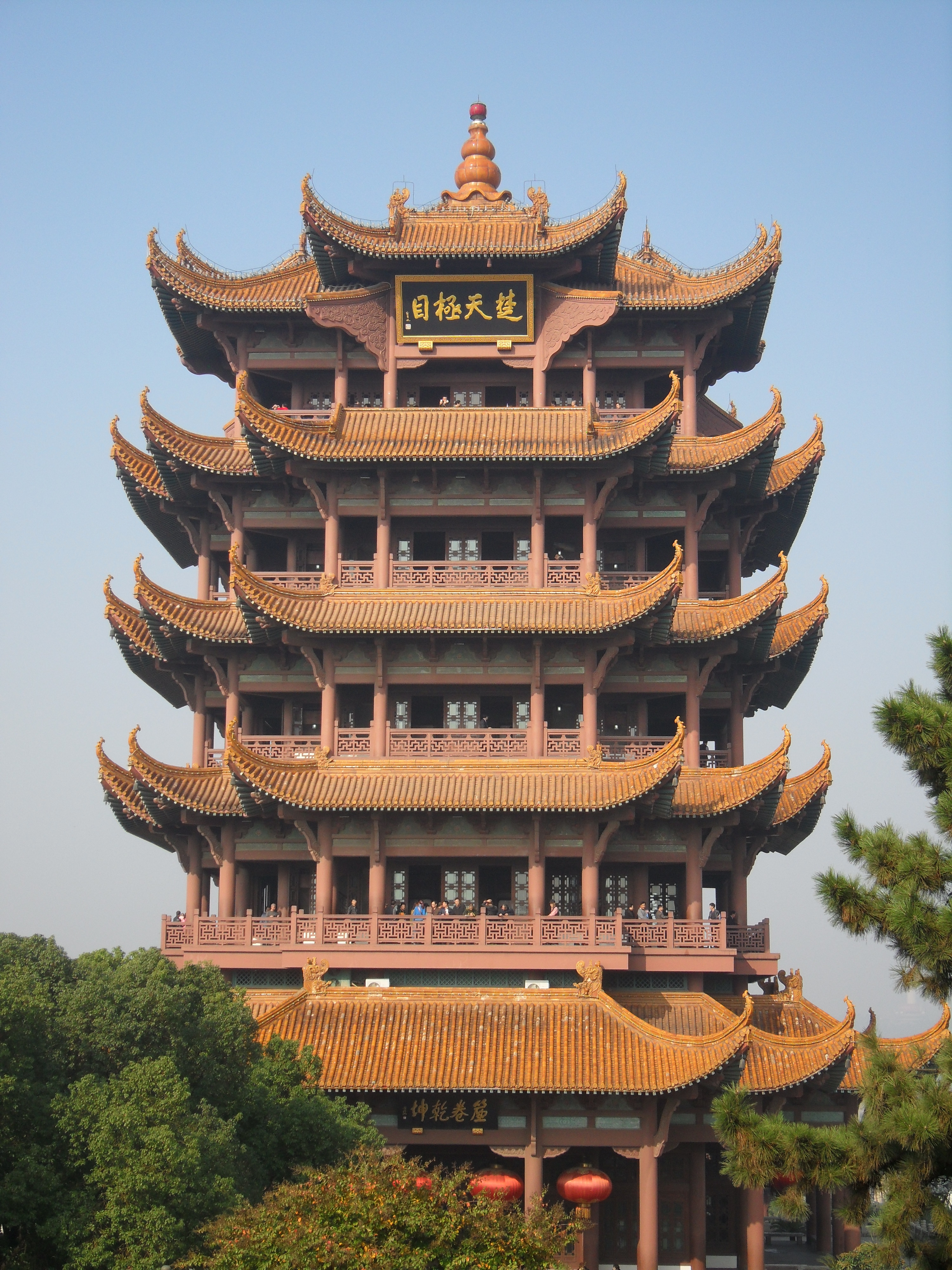
The modern Yellow Crane Tower, rebuilt from 1981 to 1985. The plaque reads Chǔtiān Jímù (楚天極目 "Gaze upon the southern sky, as far as the eye can see.")

Yellow Crane Tower (simplified Chinese: 黄鹤楼; traditional Chinese: 黃鶴樓; pinyin: Huánghè Lóu) is a traditional Chinese tower located in Wuhan. The current structure was built from 1981 to 1985, but the tower has existed in various forms from as early as AD 223. The current Yellow Crane Tower is 51.4 m (169 ft) high and covers an area of 3,219 m^{2} (34,650 sq ft). It is situated on Snake Hill (蛇山), one kilometer away from the original site, on the banks of the Yangtze River in Wuchang District.

== History ==
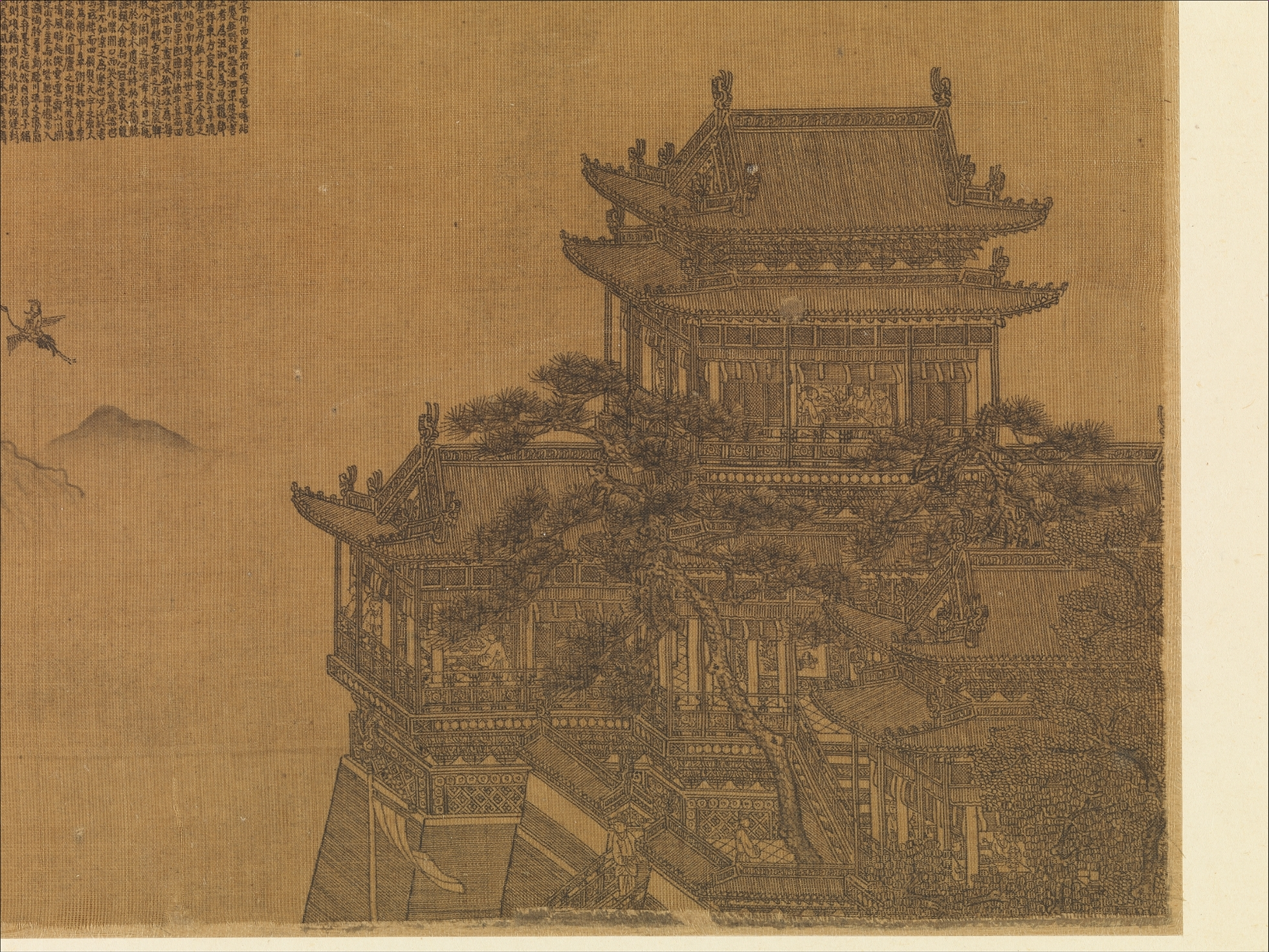
Jiehua painting of the Yellow Crane Tower by Xia Yong. Yuan Dynasty, circa 1350 CE

The Yuanhe Maps and Records of Prefectures and Counties, written almost 600 years after the construction of the tower, notes that after Sun Quan, founder of the kingdom of Eastern Wu, built the fort of Xiakou in 223, a tower was constructed at/on the Yellow Crane Jetty, west of Xiakou, and hence its name.

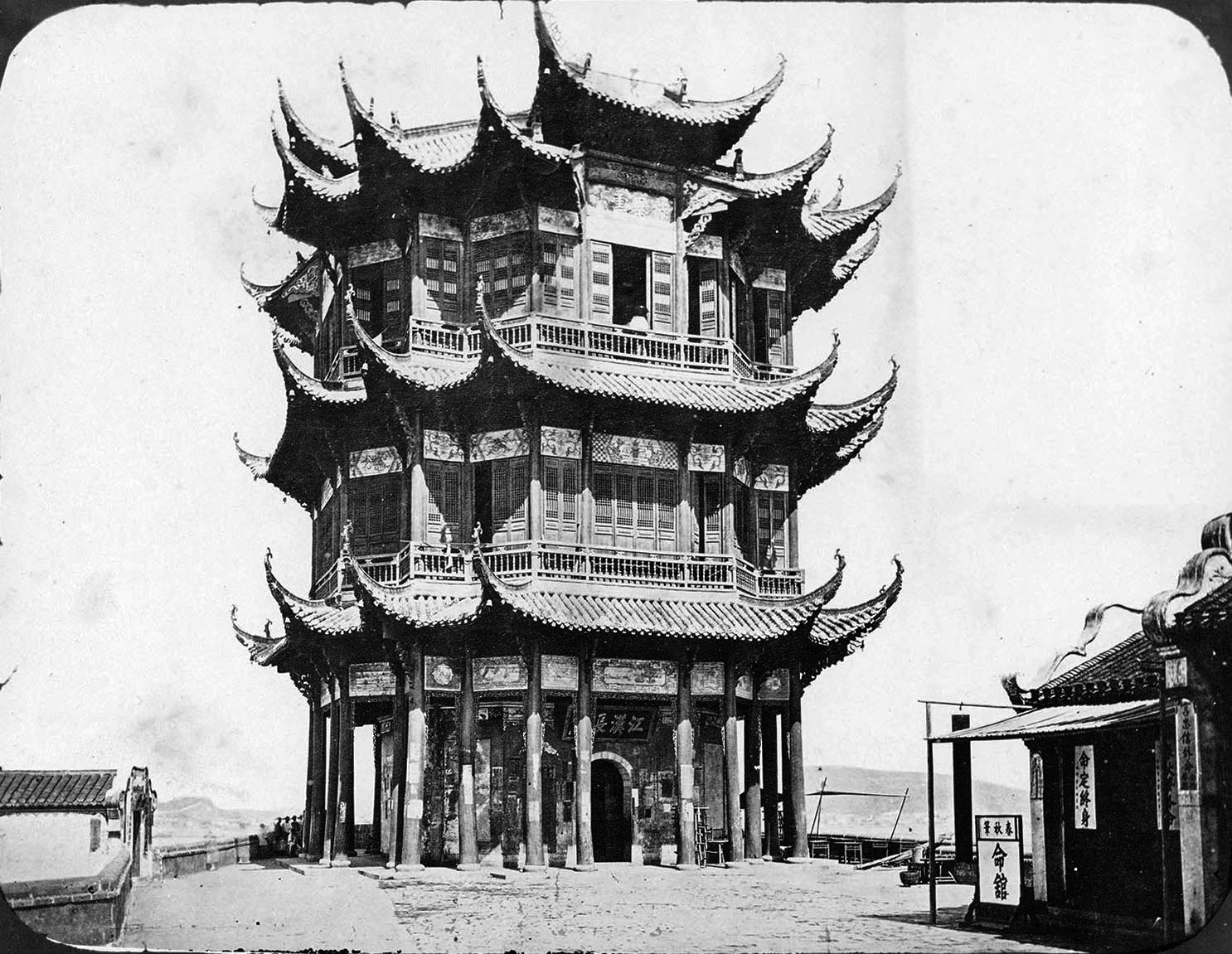
Photographed between 1866-1900

The tower has been destroyed twelve times, both by warfare and by fire, in the Ming and Qing dynasties and was repaired on ten separate occasions. The last tower at the original site was built in 1868 and destroyed in 1884. In 1907, a new tower was built near the site of the Yellow Crane Tower. Zhang Zhidong proposed "Aolüe Tower" (Chinese: 奧略樓; pinyin: Àolüè lóu) as the name of this tower and wrote an antithetical couplet for it. In 1957, the Wuhan Yangtze River Bridge was built with one trestle of the bridge on the Yellow Crane Tower's site. In 1981, the Wuhan City Government commenced reconstruction of the tower at a new location, about 1 km (0.62 mi) from the original site, and it was completed in 1985.

== Architecture ==
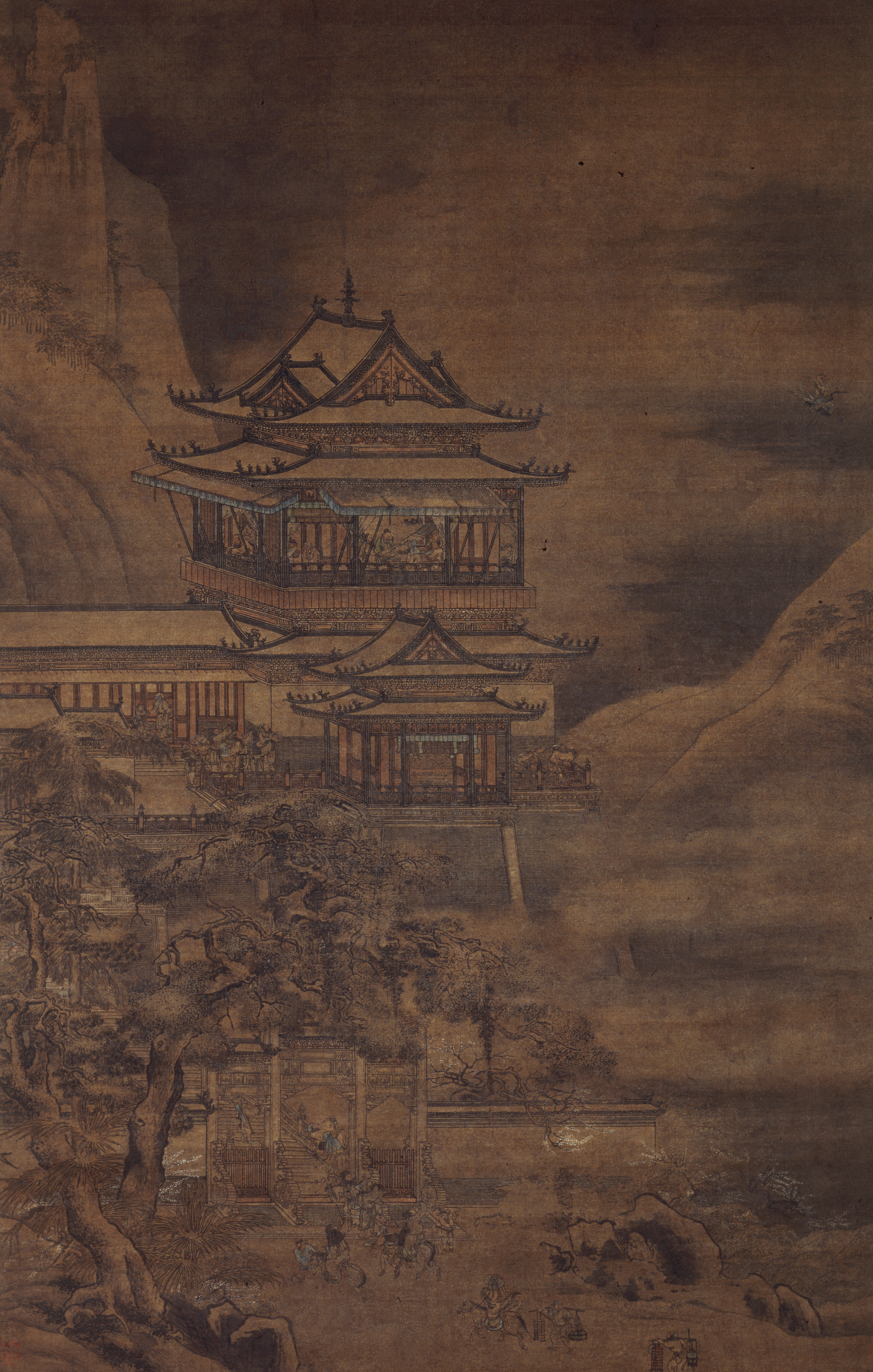
Yellow Crane Tower, painting by An Zhengwen, Ming dynasty (1368–1644)

Although the exterior of Yellow Crane Tower appears to have five stories, its interior contains nine levels, symbolizing the imperial power associated with the number nine. The eaves of the tower extend outward like the wings of a crane, embodying its cultural significance and blending traditional Chinese architectural aesthetics with cultural meaning.

=== First Floor ===
The first floor features a grand and spacious hall with a coffered ceiling over 10 meters high in the center. The front wall is adorned with a massive ceramic mural titled "White Clouds and Yellow Crane." On both sides of the hall, tall pillars bear a couplet, each line measuring up to 7 meters:

- "Refreshing air comes from the west, clearing away the mist and shaking heaven and earth;*
- The great river flows eastward, washing away sorrows of the past and present."*

=== Second Floor ===
The front wall of the second-floor hall is engraved with the "Record of Yellow Crane Tower" by Tang Dynasty writer Yan Bolu, detailing the history of the tower's construction, renovation, and the stories of notable figures. On either side of this inscription are two murals: one depicting "Sun Quan Building the City," illustrating the simultaneous rise of Yellow Crane Tower and Wuchang City; the other showing "Zhou Yu's Banquet," reflecting the visits of Three Kingdoms-era figures to the tower.

=== Third Floor ===
The third-floor hall showcases a series of portrait murals featuring renowned poets of the Tang and Song dynasties, such as Cui Hao, Li Bai, and Bai Juyi. Alongside the paintings, their famous verses about Yellow Crane Tower are inscribed.

=== Fourth Floor ===
The fourth floor is divided into several smaller halls using folding screens, displaying contemporary calligraphy and paintings by renowned artists, available for visitors to appreciate and purchase.

== Nearby structures ==
The Sacred Stupa (Chinese: 胜像宝塔; pinyin: Shèngxiàng Bǎotǎ) is 9.36 meters high and 5.68 meters wide. It is built with external stone and internal bricks, mainly stone masonry. A small amount of bricks are used in the internal tower room. It is the oldest and most complete single building preserved on the former site of the Yellow Crane Tower. The Sacred Stupa is a stupa of Tibetan Buddhism, and it is an example of the first type of stupa after Buddhism was brought from India to China. It is the only existing Lama-style white stupa in Wuhan, and it provides important physical materials for studying the history and religion of the historical and cultural significance of Wuhan in the late Yuan and early Ming Dynasties.

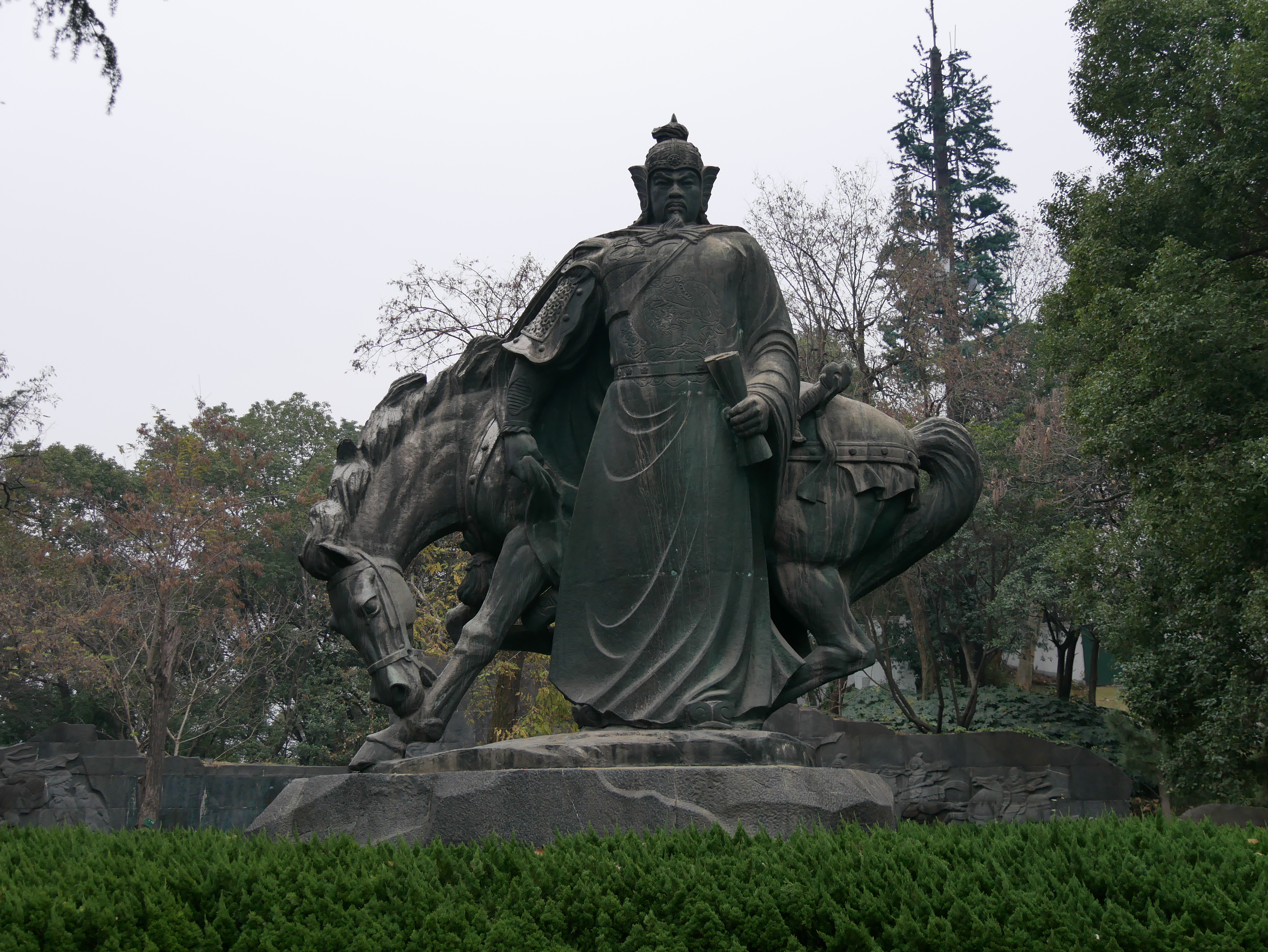
Bronze statue of Yue Fei (岳飛像)

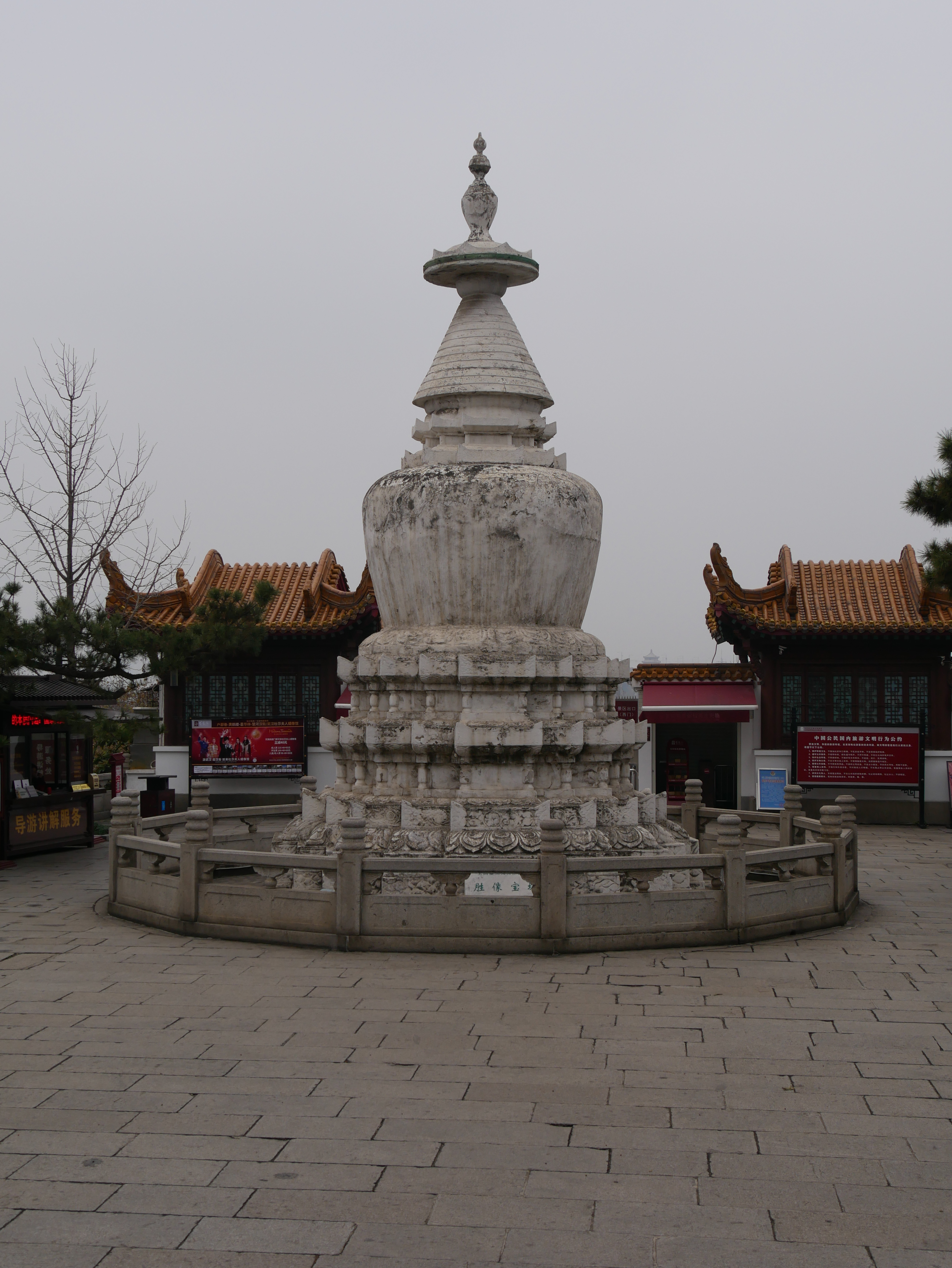
Sacred Stupa

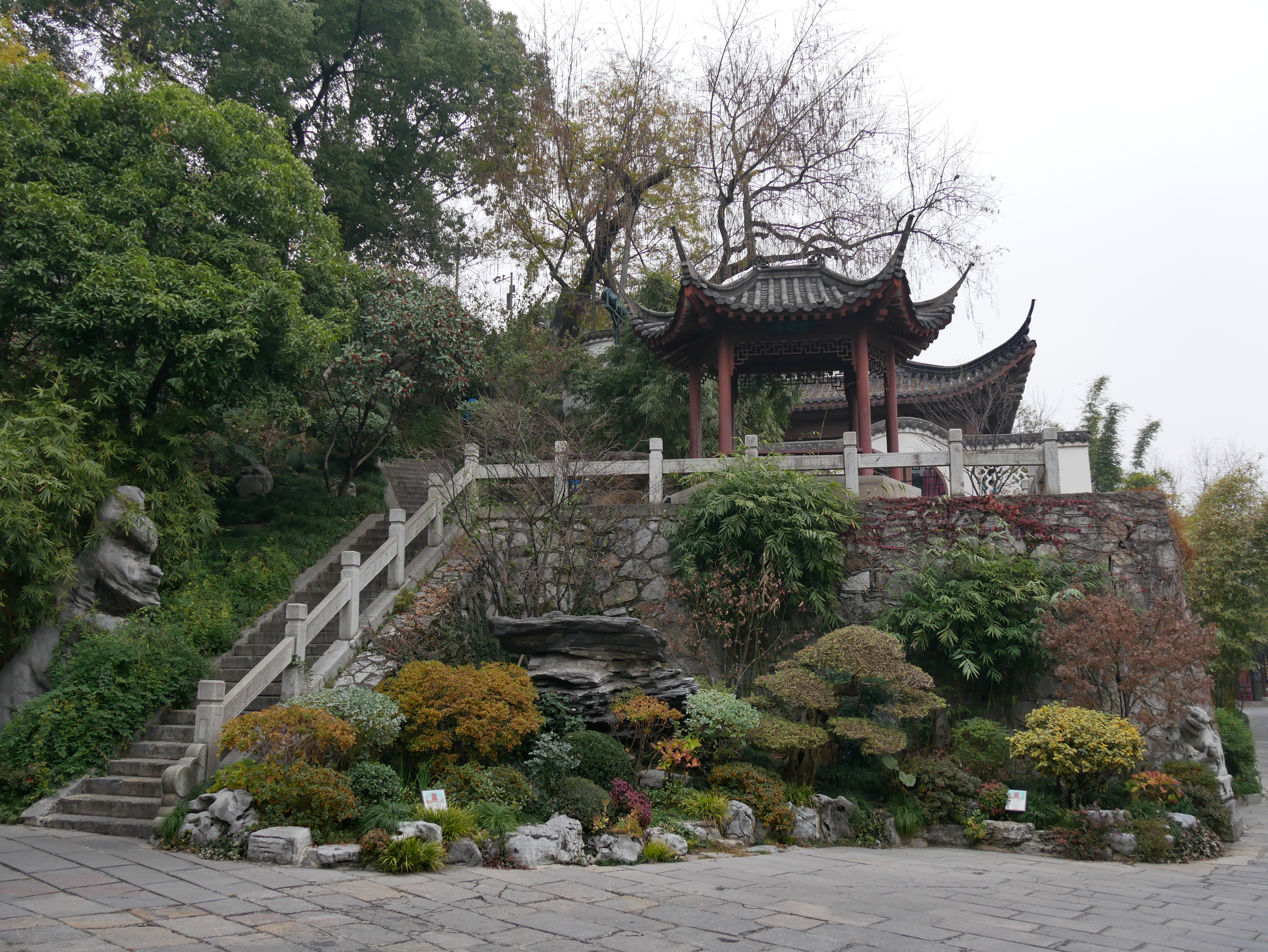
Crane-Ridding Pavilion

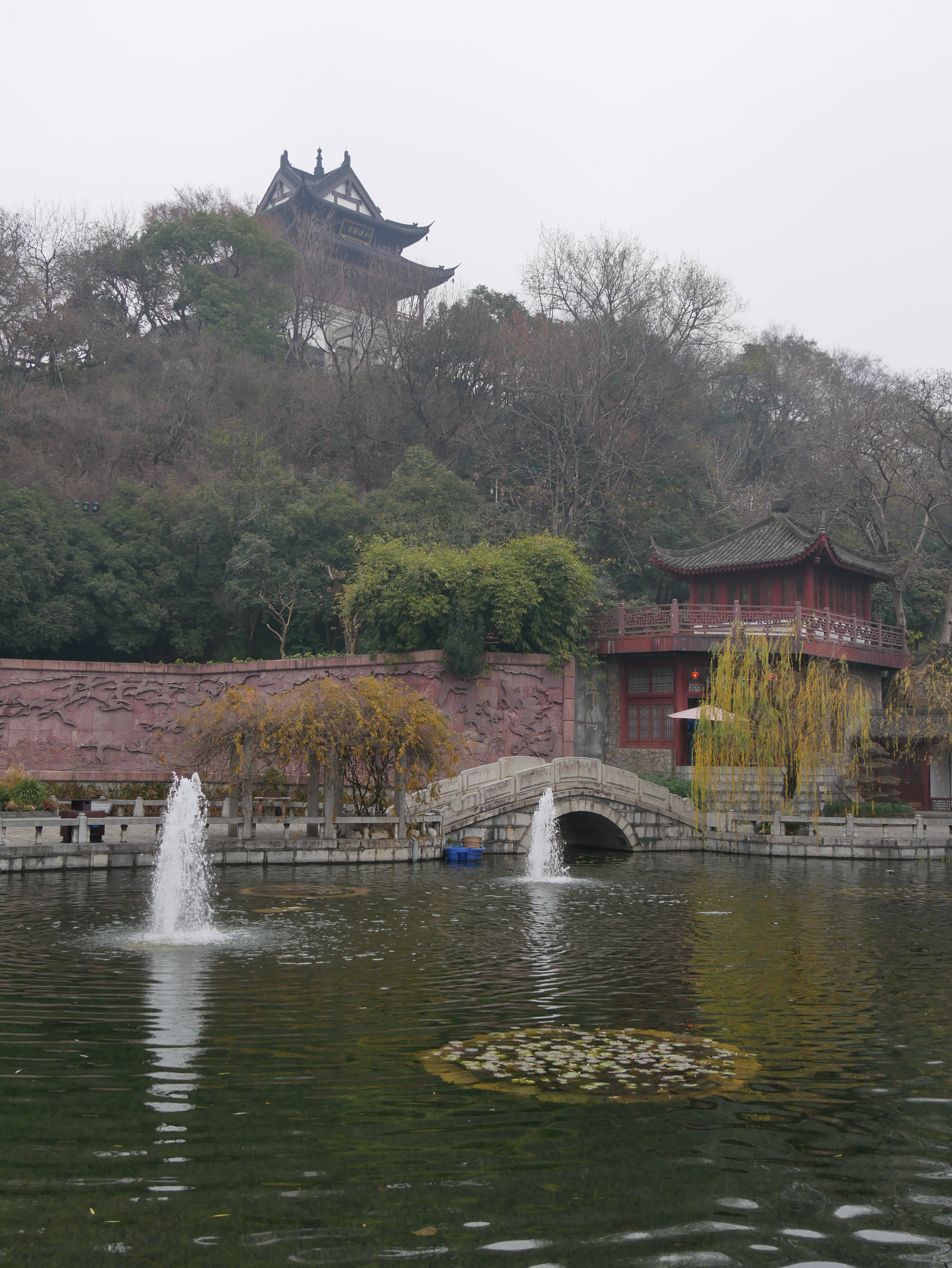
Goose Pond

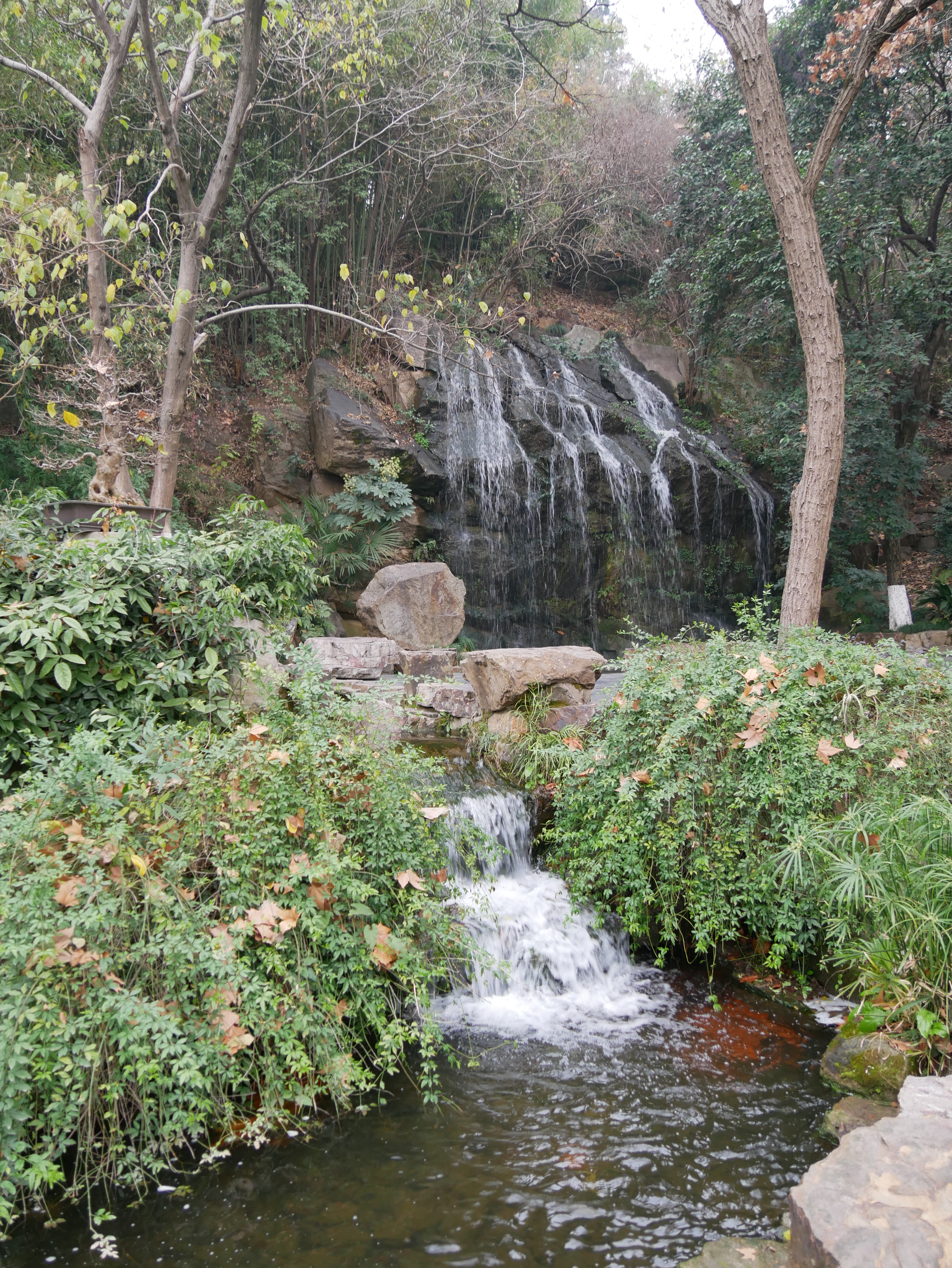
Waterfall

== Legends ==
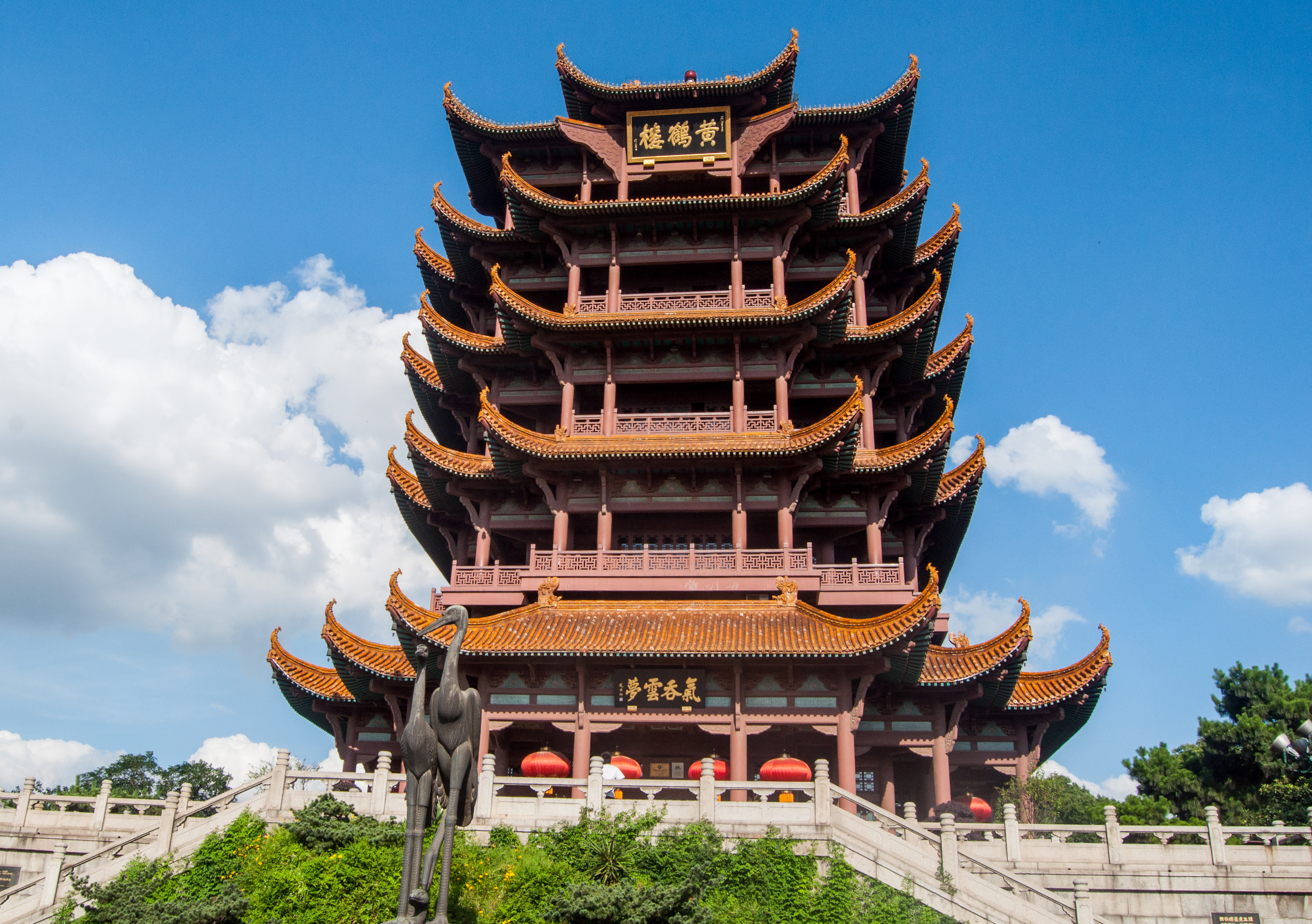
Current structure

Notwithstanding the tower's current location on Snake Hill being unrelated to its original location one kilometre away, the two popular legends related to it invoke the hill. In the first, an Immortal (仙人) named Wang Zi'an (王子安) rode away from Snake Mountain on a yellow crane and a tower was later built in commemoration of this story. In the second legend, Fei Yi becomes immortal and rides a yellow crane, often stopping on Snake Hill to take a rest.

The tower is also a sacred site of Taoism. Lü Dongbin is said to have ascended to heaven from here. There is a small cave in the hill beneath the tower with Lü Dongbin statue. The cave has been called Lü Zu Dong, literately meaning cave of Lü Dongbin.

== Literature ==
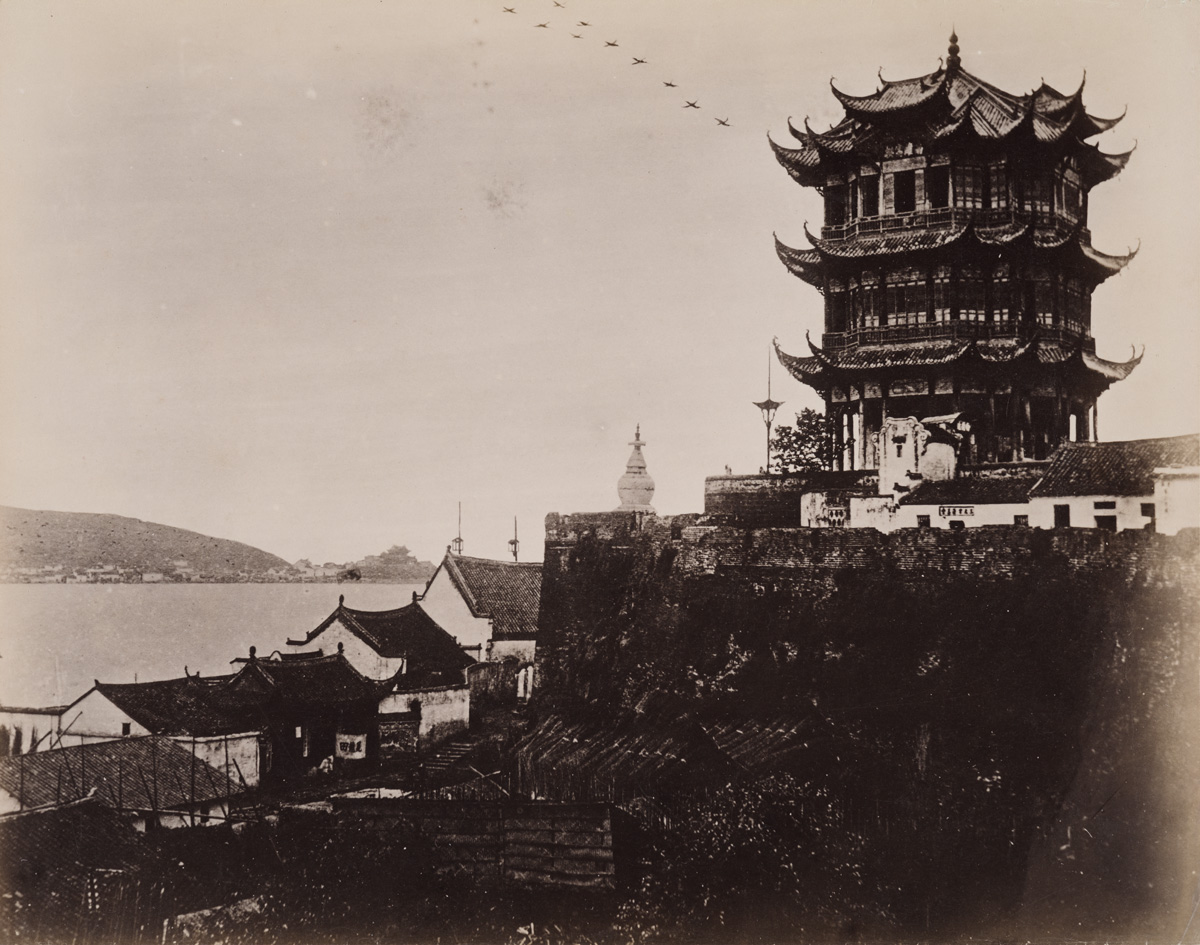
Yellow Crane Tower in the 1870s. Albumen silver print. The Loewentheil Photography of China Collection

=== Poem by Cui Hao ===
Yellow Crane Tower was made famous by an 8th-century poem written by Cui Hao, titled "Yellow Crane Tower" (黃鶴樓). The original text of the poem is shown below:

昔人已乘黃鶴去， 此地空餘黃鶴樓。
黃鶴一去不復返， 白雲千載空悠悠。
晴川歷歷漢陽樹， 芳草萋萋鸚鵡洲。
日暮鄉關何處是， 煙波江上使人愁。

A modern English translation is:

Long ago one's gone riding the yellow crane, all that remained is the Yellow Crane Tower.
Once the yellow crane left it will never return, for one thousand years the clouds wandered carelessly.
The clear river reflects each Hanyang tree, fragrant grasses lushly grow on Parrot Island.
At sunset, which direction leads to my hometown? One could not help feeling melancholy along the misty river.

=== Poem by Li Bai ===
There are other poems about the Yellow Crane Tower by Li Bai. One was written on the occasion of Li Bai parting with his friend and poetic colleague, Meng Haoran. The poem is titled "Seeing off Meng Haoran for Guangling at Yellow Crane Tower" (黃鶴樓送孟浩然之廣陵), and is shown in its original form below:

故人西辭黃鶴樓，
煙花三月下揚州。
孤帆遠影碧空盡，
唯見長江天際流。

A modern English translation is:

My old friend bids farewell to me in the west at Yellow Crane Tower.
Amid March's mist and flowers he goes down to Yangzhou.
The distant image of his lonely sail disappears in the blue sky,
And all I see is the Long River flowing to the edge of sky.

=== Poem by Mao Zedong ===
Mao Zedong produced a poem about the Yellow Crane Tower in Spring 1927, referencing Cui Hao's historical piece. It was produced at Tortoise Mountain in Wuhan after the failure of the Autumn Harvest Uprising in Henan due to problems garnering support from Changsha.

The poem has the rhyme scheme of Pu Sa Man.

菩萨蛮·黃鶴樓
現代-毛澤東
茫茫九派流中國，沈沈一線穿南北。
煙雨莽蒼蒼，龜蛇鎖大江。
黃鶴知何去？剩有遊人處。
把酒酹滔滔，心潮逐浪高！

China is vague and immense where the nine rivers pour.
The horizon is a deep line threading north and south.
Blue haze and rain.
Hills like a snake or tortoise guard the river.

The yellow crane is gone.
Where?
Now this tower and region are for the wanderer.
I drink wine to the bubbling water - the heroes are gone.
Like a tidal wave a wonder rises in my heart.

== Tourism ==
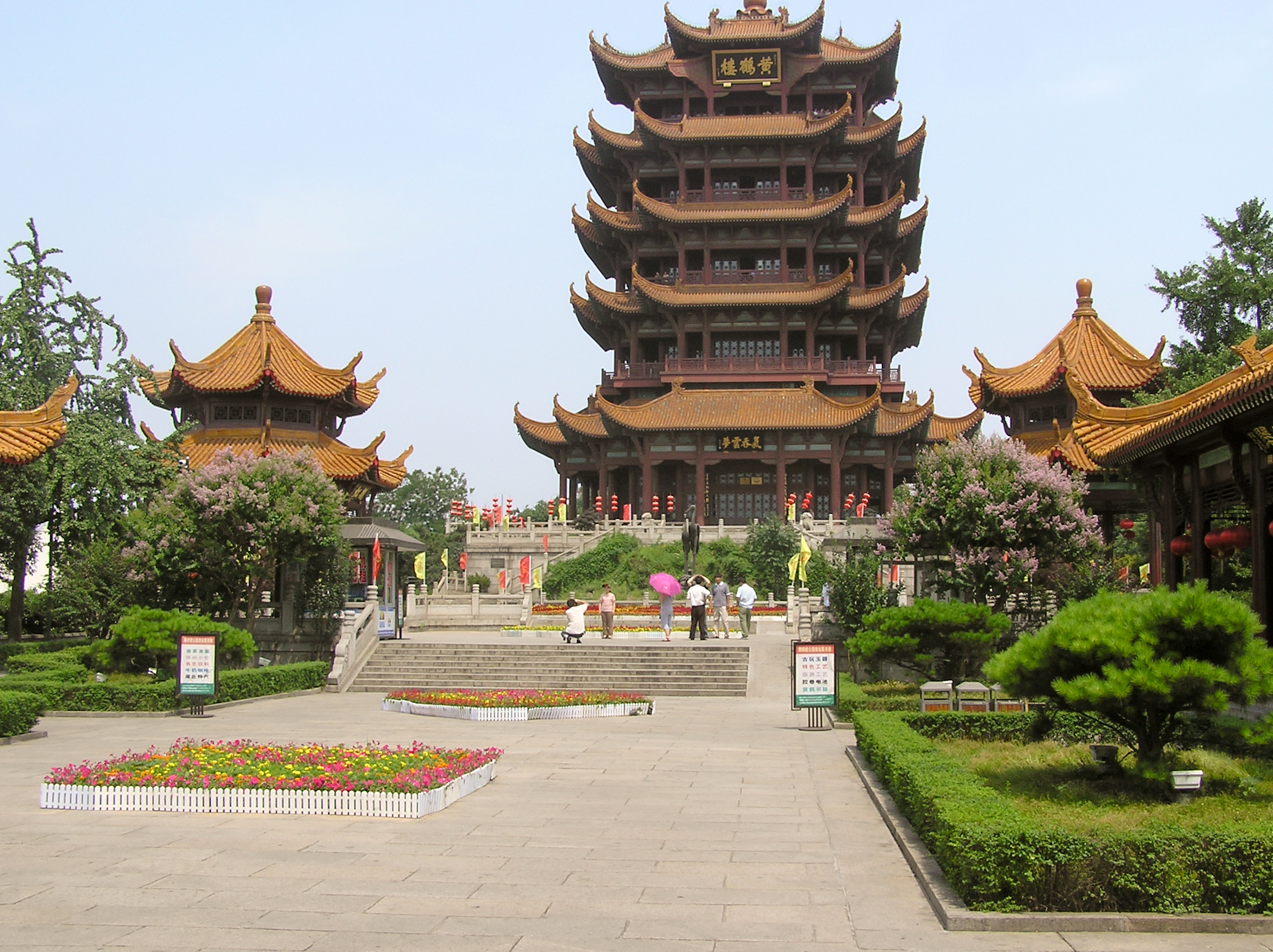
With nearby structures

The tower and its surroundings have been marked as Yellow Crane Tower Park. There are tour services that can be hired for a fee at the entrance. The top of the tower has a broad view of its surroundings and the Yangtze River. Yellow Crane Tower is considered one of the Four Great Towers of China. In its modern version, it has the appearance of an ancient tower but is built of modern materials, including an elevator. Each level has its own display. To the east on the hill, a large temple bell may be rung by tourists for a small fee. There are court dances in the western yard during the week-long National Day of the People's Republic of China celebration. The tower is classified as an AAAAA scenic area by the China National Tourism Administration. At the south side of the tower, there is a statue of Yue Fei because he was the garrison around this area in Song Dynasty.

== Gallery ==
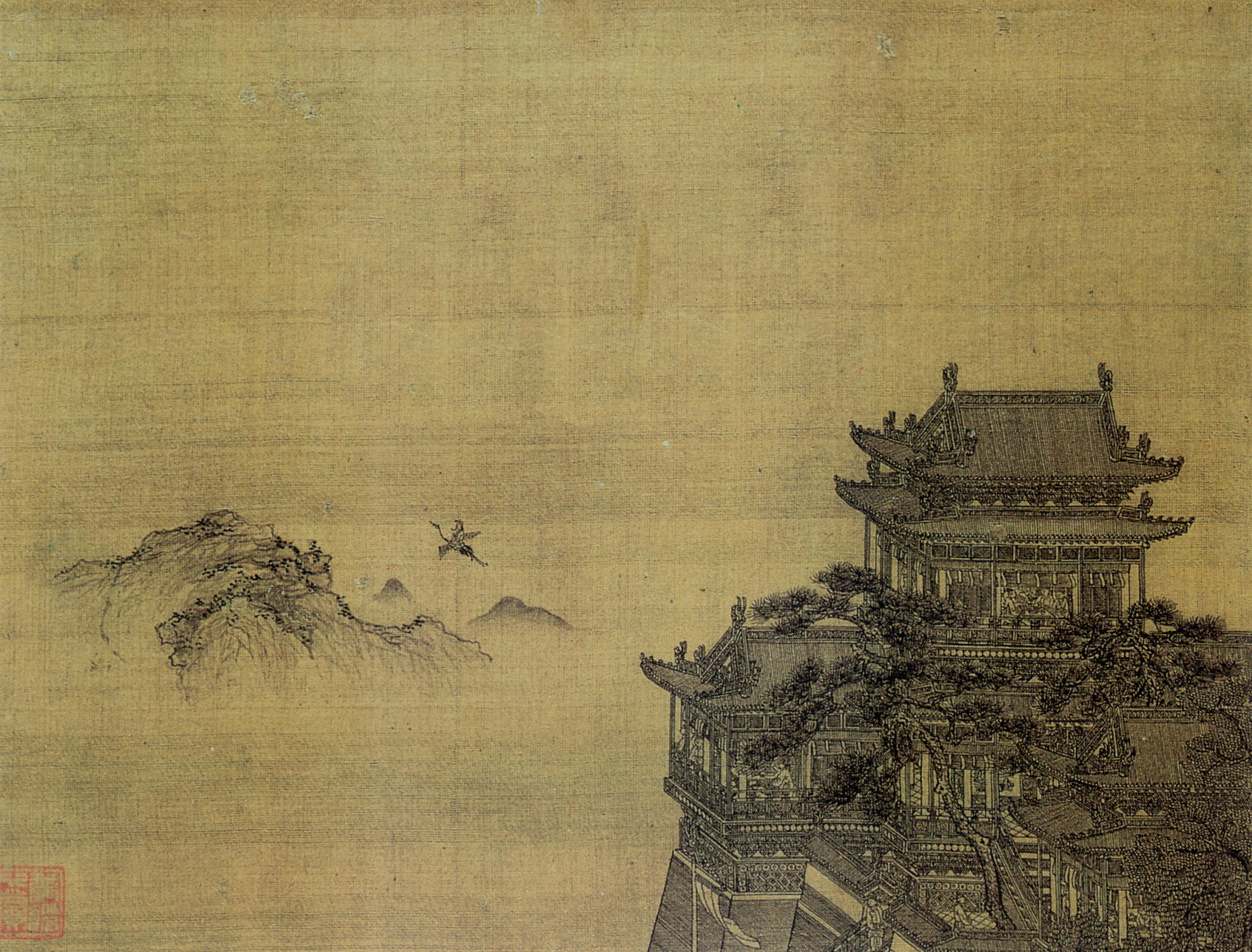
Yellow Crane Tower by Xia Yong, Yuan dynasty

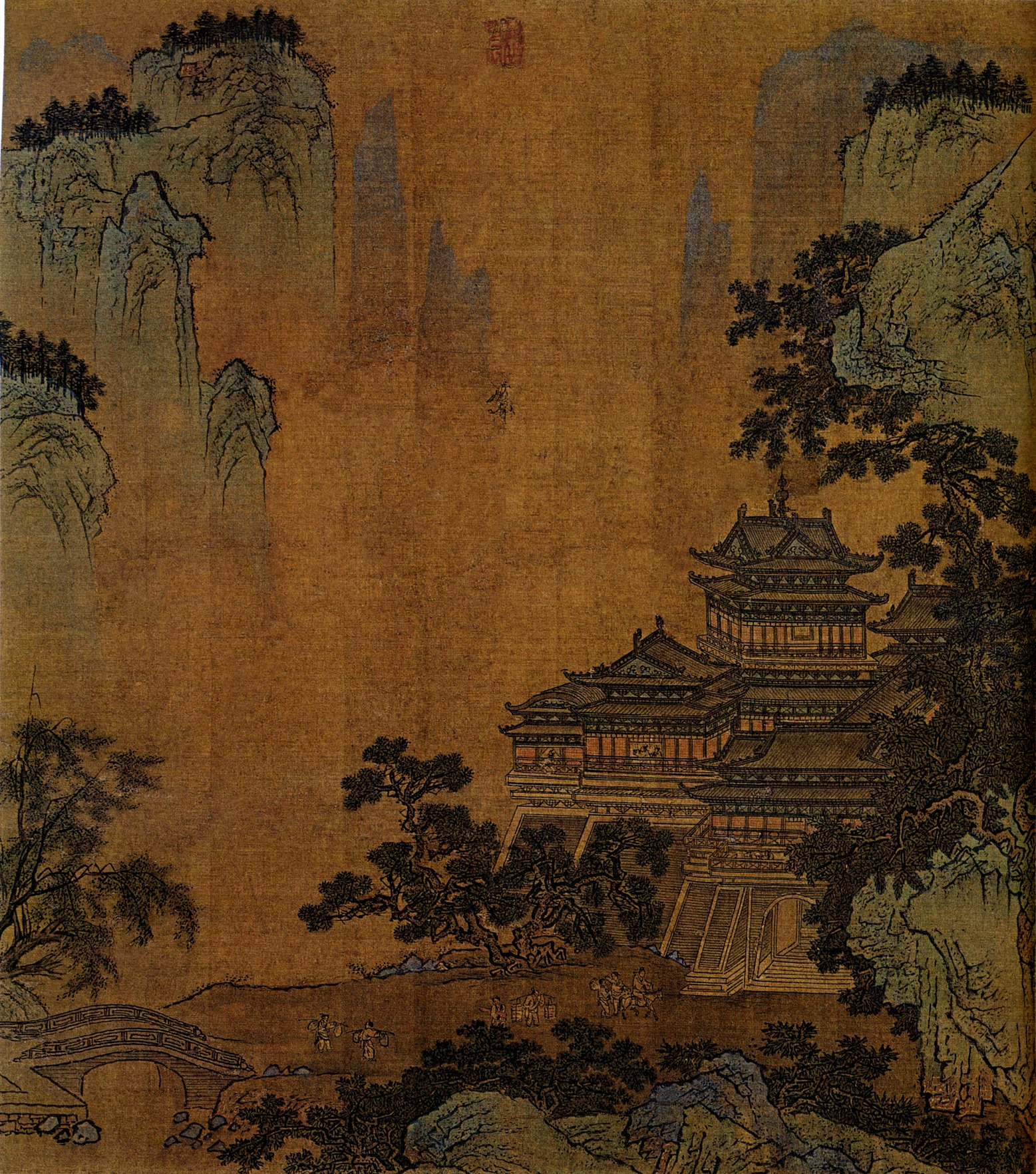
Yellow Crane Tower, anonymous artist, Ming dynasty

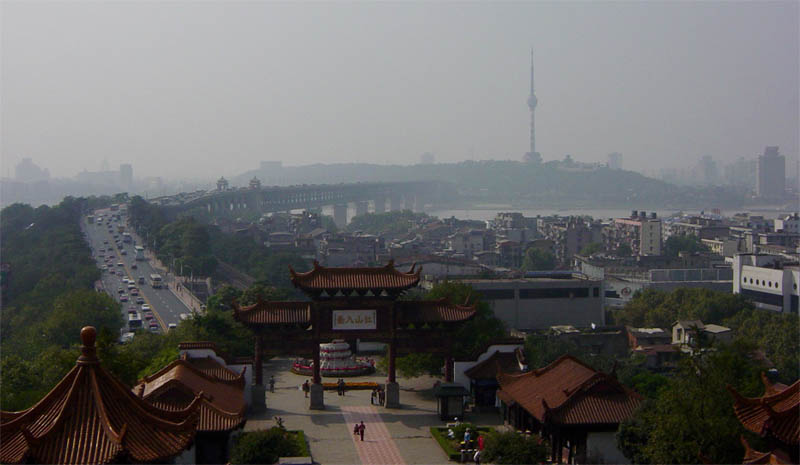
View to the west with Tortoise Hill and the Tortoise Mountain TV Tower

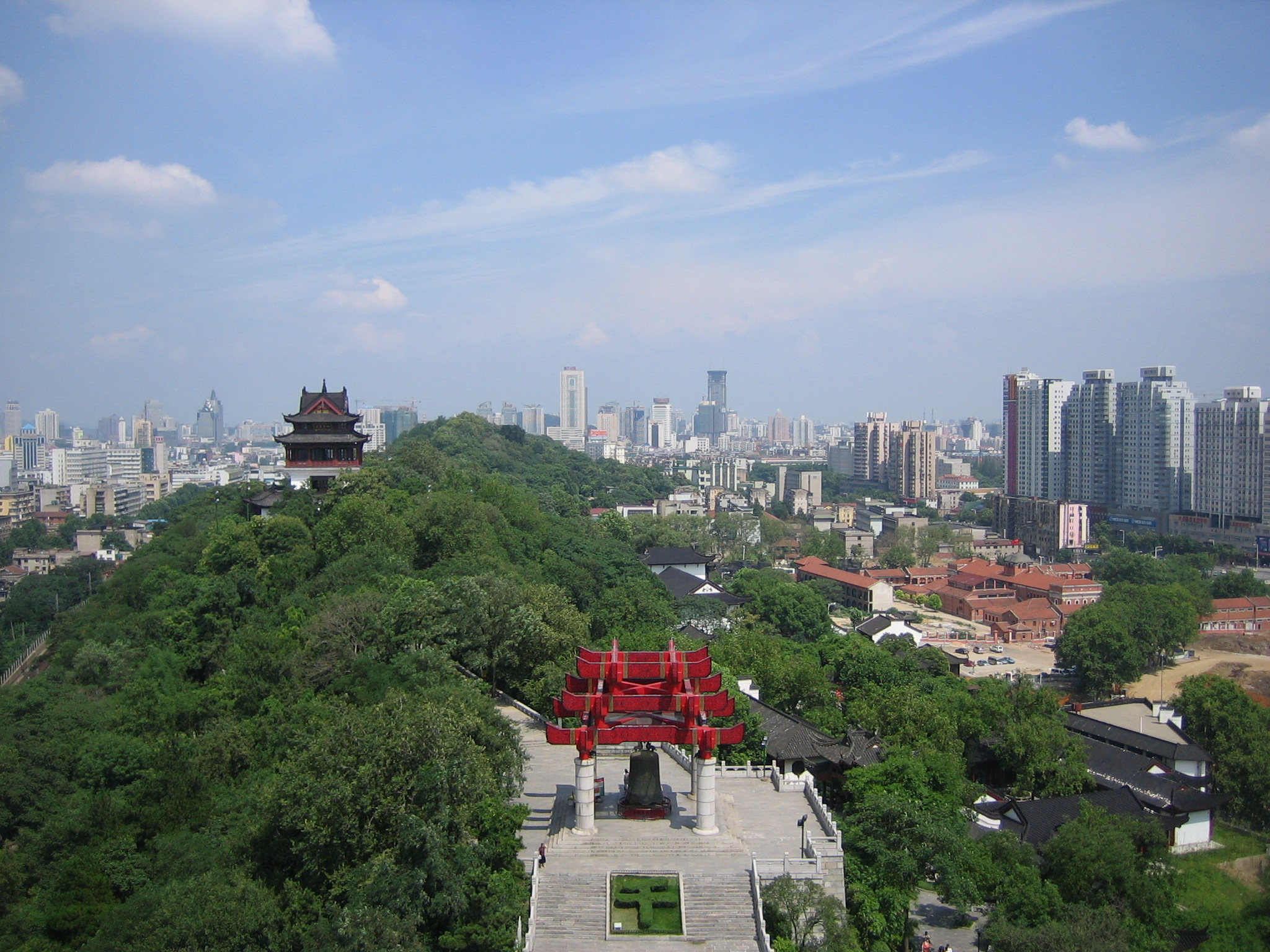
View to the east from the Yellow Crane Tower. Snake Hill is in the middle and the red-brick compound of the Wuchang Uprising memorial is to the right

== See also ==
- Crane (bird)
- Crane in Chinese mythology
- Four Great Towers of China
- Pavilion of Prince Teng
- Poetry of Mao Zedong
- Yueyang Tower
- Wuhan
- Yangtze River
- Xian (Taoism)
