= Yongji, Shanxi =

Yongji 永济市 Yungtsi
- County-level city
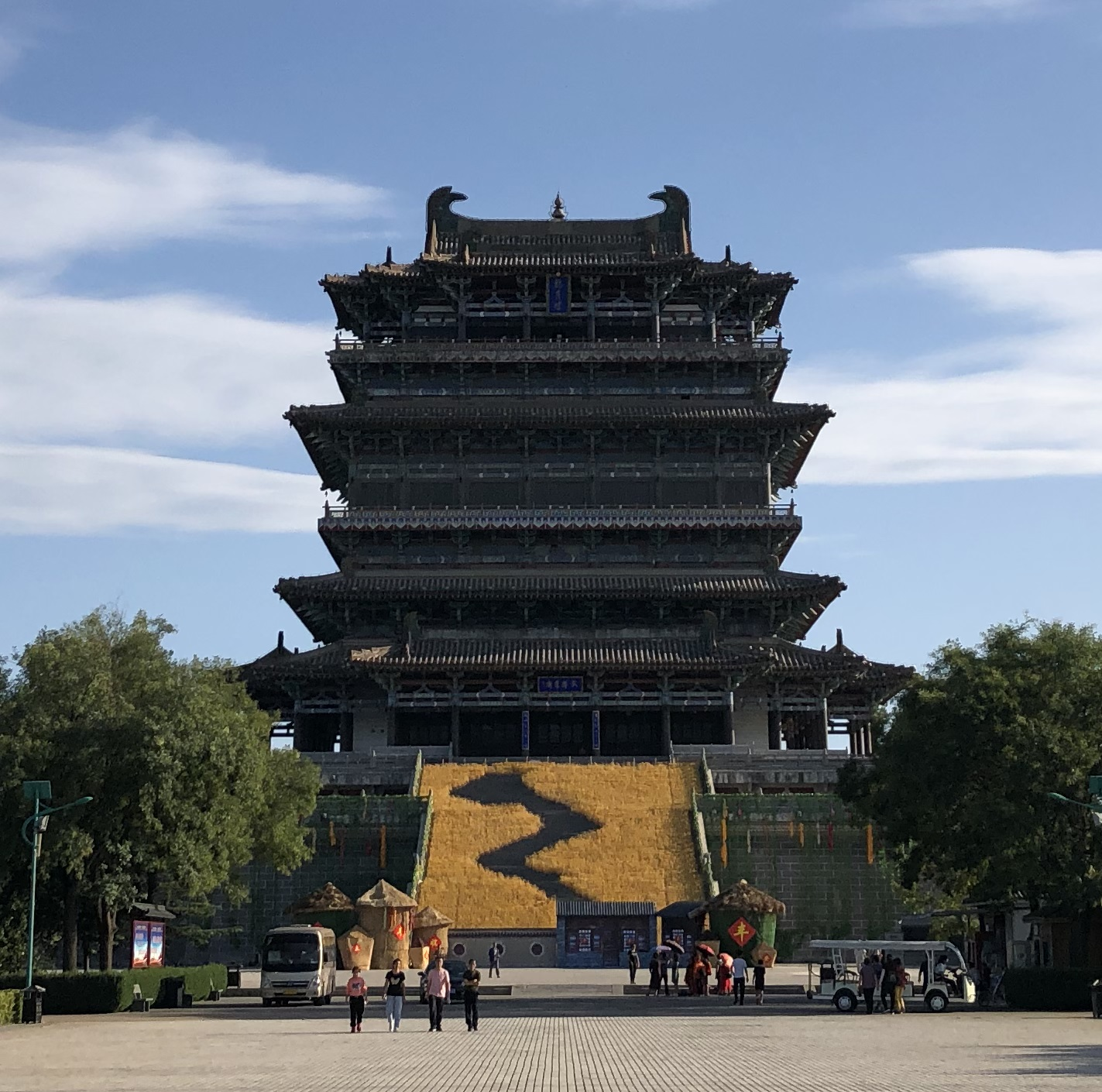
- Stork Tower

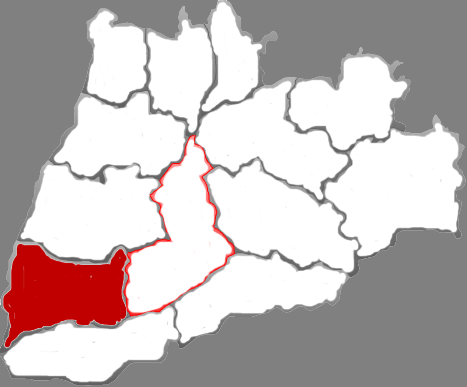
- Location in Yuncheng

- Location in Shanxi
- Coordinates: 34°52′01″N 110°26′53″E
- Country: People's Republic of China
- Province: Shanxi
- Prefecture-level city: Yuncheng

Area
  - County-level city: 1,221.1 km^{2} (471.5 sq mi)
  - Urban: 214.34 km^{2} (82.76 sq mi)

Population (2017)
  - County-level city: 452,000
  - Density: 370/km^{2} (959/sq mi)
  - Urban: 171,000
- Time zone: UTC+8 (China Standard)
- Website: www.yongji.gov.cn/site/tpl/4371165

Yongji (simplified Chinese: 永济; traditional Chinese: 永濟; pinyin: Yǒngjì) is a county-level city in the prefecture-level city of Yuncheng, in the southwest of Shanxi province, China, bordering Shaanxi province to the west.

According to a census in 2011, the population in Yongji was 446,000.

== Culture ==
Stork Tower and Yingying Pagoda are located in the area.

== Climate ==
Climate data for Yongji, elevation 354 m (1,161 ft), (1991–2020 normals, extremes 1981–2010)
Month	Jan	Feb	Mar	Apr	May	Jun	Jul	Aug	Sep	Oct	Nov	Dec	Year
Record high °C (°F)	15.5 (59.9)	20.7 (69.3)	29.8 (85.6)	34.1 (93.4)	39.6 (103.3)	41.0 (105.8)	41.1 (106.0)	40.0 (104.0)	40.2 (104.4)	32.2 (90.0)	24.2 (75.6)	18.4 (65.1)	41.1 (106.0)
Mean daily maximum °C (°F)	5.5 (41.9)	10.1 (50.2)	16.5 (61.7)	23.0 (73.4)	28.1 (82.6)	32.7 (90.9)	33.2 (91.8)	31.3 (88.3)	26.5 (79.7)	20.3 (68.5)	13.1 (55.6)	6.8 (44.2)	20.6 (69.1)
Daily mean °C (°F)	−0.1 (31.8)	3.9 (39.0)	10.0 (50.0)	16.3 (61.3)	21.4 (70.5)	26.1 (79.0)	27.5 (81.5)	25.8 (78.4)	20.8 (69.4)	14.5 (58.1)	7.4 (45.3)	1.2 (34.2)	14.6 (58.2)
Mean daily minimum °C (°F)	−4.4 (24.1)	−0.9 (30.4)	4.6 (40.3)	10.4 (50.7)	15.3 (59.5)	20.0 (68.0)	22.6 (72.7)	21.3 (70.3)	16.3 (61.3)	10.1 (50.2)	2.9 (37.2)	−3.1 (26.4)	9.6 (49.3)
Record low °C (°F)	−13.6 (7.5)	−14.3 (6.3)	−8.5 (16.7)	−1.2 (29.8)	1.6 (34.9)	11.1 (52.0)	16.0 (60.8)	13.0 (55.4)	5.6 (42.1)	−3.4 (25.9)	−10.0 (14.0)	−13.2 (8.2)	−14.3 (6.3)
Average precipitation mm (inches)	4.4 (0.17)	8.0 (0.31)	13.5 (0.53)	35.6 (1.40)	49.3 (1.94)	54.4 (2.14)	83.4 (3.28)	74.5 (2.93)	83.1 (3.27)	52.4 (2.06)	20.2 (0.80)	3.7 (0.15)	482.5 (18.98)
Average precipitation days (≥ 0.1 mm)	2.9	3.2	4.4	6.2	7.7	7.4	8.9	8.5	9.4	7.7	5.2	2.5	74
Average snowy days	3.8	2.4	0.9	0	0	0	0	0	0	0	1.0	2.2	10.3
Average relative humidity (%)	57	56	54	57	57	58	69	73	74	72	68	59	63
Mean monthly sunshine hours	136.1	139.7	180.2	213.0	230.8	224.2	225.5	213.3	160.3	152.8	138.5	140.8	2,155.2
Percentage possible sunshine	43	45	48	54	53	52	52	52	44	44	45	46	48
Source: China Meteorological Administration
