= Wang Zhihuan =

Wang Zhihuan (traditional Chinese: 王之渙; simplified Chinese: 王之涣; pinyin: Wáng Zhīhuàn; c. 688–742), alternatively transliterated as Wang Tsu-huan, was a Chinese poet of the Kaiyuan era of Emperor Xuanzong of Tang. He is best known for his jueju "Climbing Stork Tower" (登鸛雀樓).

== Poetry ==
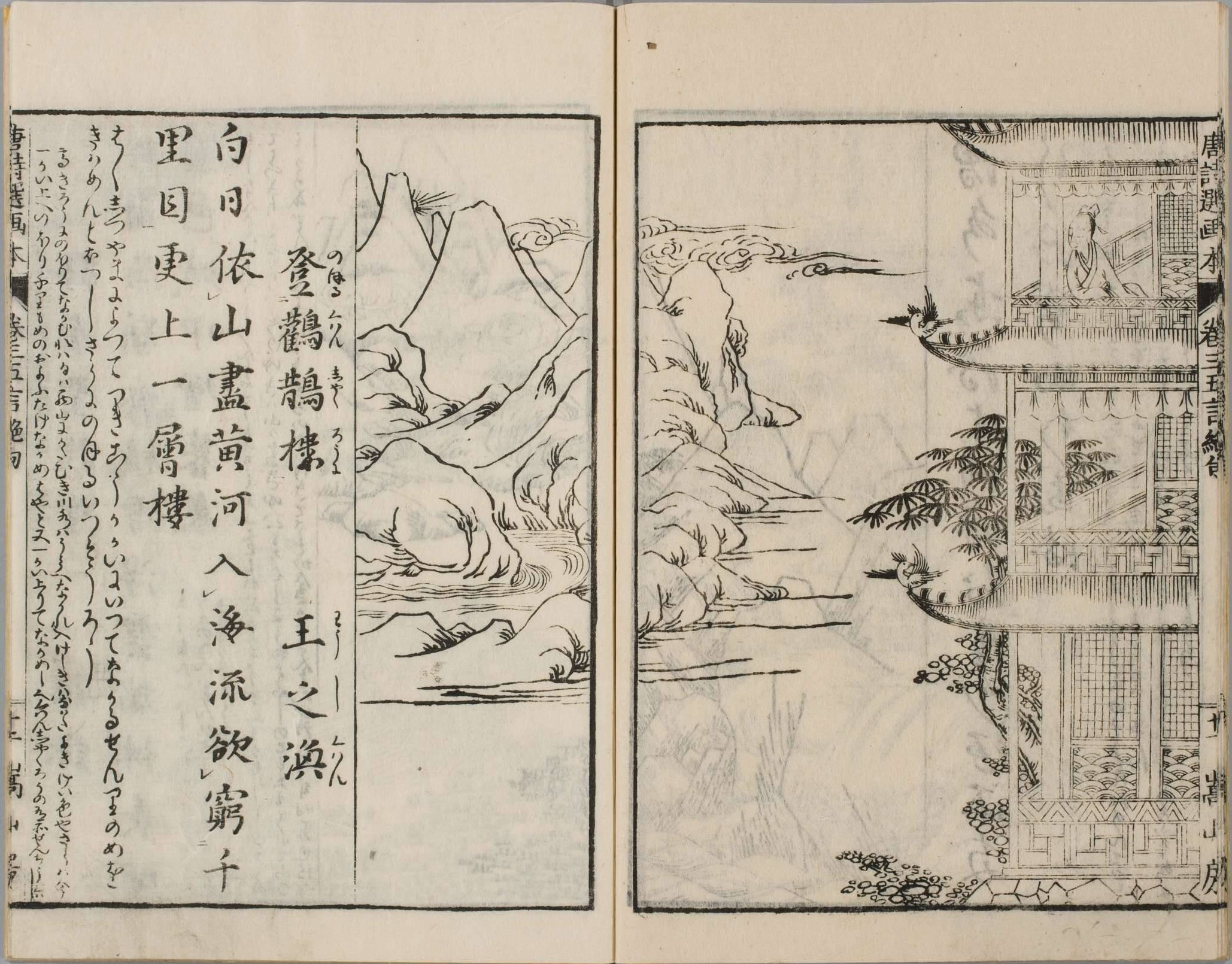
"Climbing Stork Tower" (登鸛雀樓) by Wang Zhihuan, in a Japanese illustrated edition of selected Tang poems (1836).

No collection of Wang's poems seems to have been made. Only six of his poems survive, all of which are quatrains, but almost every one has become a classic.

Two poems were included in the famous poetry anthology Three Hundred Tang Poems, translated by Witter Bynner as "Climbing Stork Tower" (also called "On the Stork Tower" or "At Heron Lodge", a five-character-quatrain) and "Beyond the Border", a folk-song-styled-verse.

== Famous competition at the wine shop ==
Wang Zhihuan was once involved in a famous incident at a wine shop with fellow poets Gao Shi and Wang Changling, in which they agreed to compete as to which of their poems would be most sung by the professional entertainers who happened to show up in the course of that evening's entertainment. Towards the beginning of the evening, one performer happened to sing one of Wang Changling's poems. Not too long after that, another performer sang one of Gao Shi's poems. And, then another performer recited another lyric of Wang Changling's. The performance then went on, with one for Gao Shi, two for Wang Changling, and none for Wang Zhihuan. It so happened that one of the female entertainers known as the most beautiful finally gave her performance: she delivered a piece, based on a poem of Wang Zhihuan's (this was the one, which, much later, Witter Bynner translated as "Beyond the Border").

== See also ==
- Tang poetry
- Three Hundred Tang Poems
