= Yueyang Tower =

- 岳阳楼
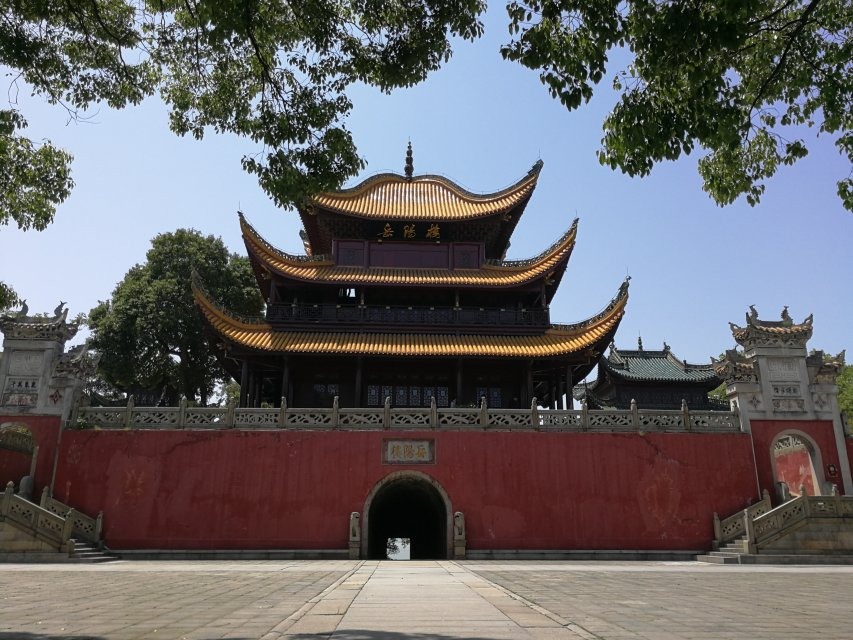
- Picture of Yueyang Tower

- Location within Hunan

General information
- Type: Tower
- Location: Yueyang, Hunan, China
- Coordinates: 29°23′05″N 113°05′18″E
- Opened: 1950
- Renovated: 1950

Height
- Height: 19.42 metres (63.7 ft)

Technical details
- Material: Brick and wood
- Floor area: 39,000 square metres (420,000 sq ft)

Design and construction
- Known for: Memorial to Yueyang Tower by Fan Zhongyan

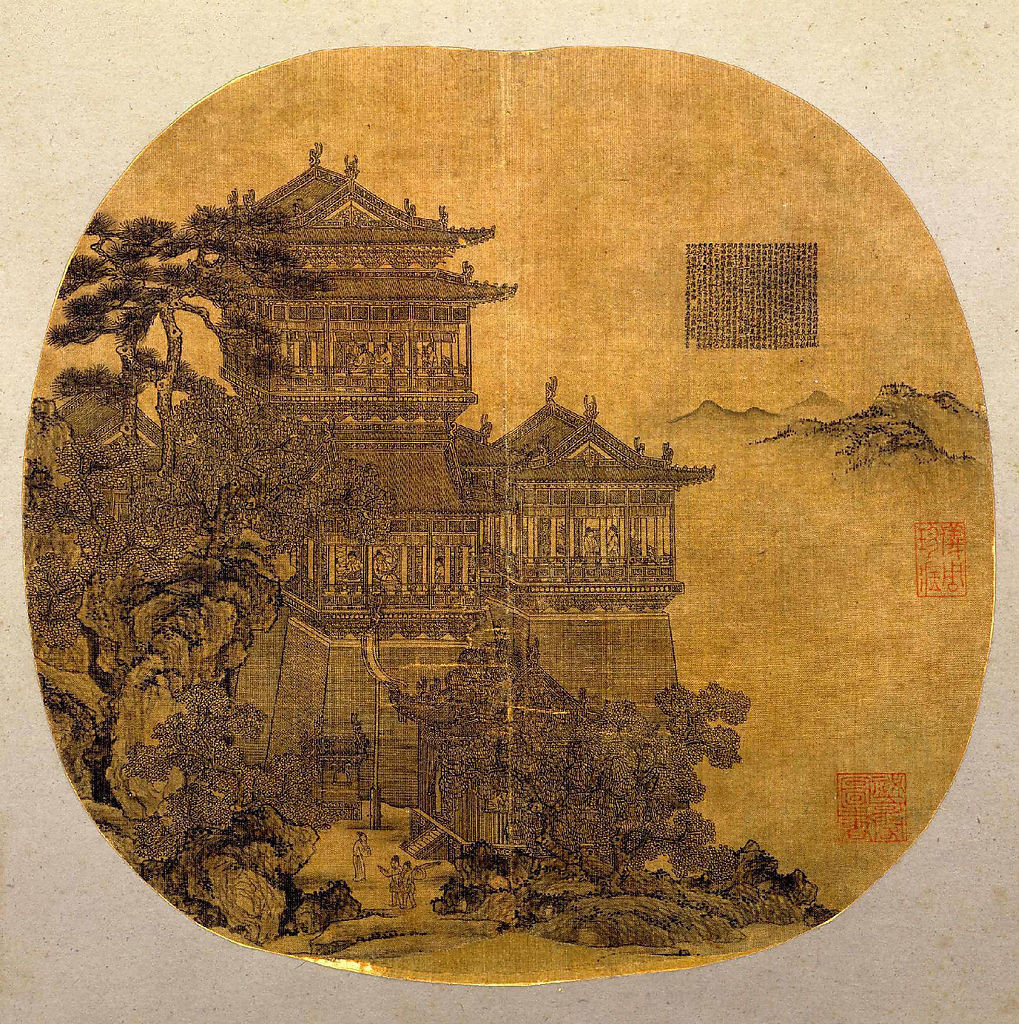
Xia Yong - Yueyang Lou (岳阳楼). Yuan dynasty

Yueyang Tower (simplified Chinese: 岳阳楼; traditional Chinese: 岳陽樓; pinyin: Yuèyáng Lóu) is an ancient Chinese pavilion in Yueyang, Hunan Province, on the shore of Lake Dongting. Alongside the Pavilion of Prince Teng and Yellow Crane Tower, it is one of the Three Great Towers of Jiangnan. Yueyang Tower became famous for Memorial to Yueyang Tower (岳阳楼记) written by Fan Zhongyan, an eminent scholar and statesman of the Northern Song dynasty (960–1127) in China.

Located on the city wall of the west gate of the ancient city in Yueyang city, Hunan province, China, Yueyang Tower faces Junshan Island and overlooks Dongting Lake, being exquisite and imposing. Since ancient times, it has enjoyed the good reputation that Dongting Lake is the best among lakes, and Yueyang Tower is incomparable among towers. Yueyang Tower with yellow tiles and overhanging eaves set the green forest off (黄瓦飞檐). Its roof covered with yellow glazed tiles (黄色琉璃瓦) has a smooth curve, precipitous yet warped, just like a general's helmet in ancient China. It is the only ancient building with a helmet roof structure in China.

== History ==
Legend has it that this helmet roof was specially designed to commemorate a general of the Three Kingdoms period (220–280): Lu Su, the famous general of Eastern Wu (222–280).

In the 13th year of the Jian'an period of the Eastern Han dynasty (25–220), namely AD 208, in the famous Battle of Red Cliffs, Lu Su, the senior general of the Eastern Wu, joined the alliance of Sun Quan and Liu Bei.

The allied forces of Sun Quan and Liu Bei launched fire attacks on 800,000 soldiers of the troops of Cao Cao, in the red cliff (today's Chibi city, Hubei province), thus forming the tripartite confrontation of Cao Wei (220–265), Shu Han (221–263), and Eastern Wu (222–280) from then on. Later, Sun Quan of Eastern Wu dispatched Lu Su to lead troops to defend Baqiu (巴丘; today's Yueyang), so as to scramble for Jingzhou with Liu Bei. Lu Su built Yuejun Tower (阅军楼) on the top of the city wall by Dongting Lake, to train and review the navy. Yuejun Tower was the former Yueyang Tower. Under the Yueyang Gate, and by Dongting Lake, was the site of the Call-officers-roll Platform (点将台), where Lu Su reviewed the navy of Eastern Wu at that time.

Before the Tang dynasty (618–907), Yueyang Tower was mainly used for the military. After the Tang dynasty, it gradually became a famous scenic spot where men of letters chanted poetry and composed fu.

Li Bai, a poet of the Tang dynasty, drank against the wind and wrote: "The water and the sky merge in one color, and the wonders of natural beauty and boundless" (水天一色，风月无边). Du Fu, another poet of the Tang dynasty, ascended Yueyang Tower while ill and wrote the verse, famous through the ages, that "I heard of Dongting Lake before, and now I ascend Yueyang Tower" (昔闻洞庭水，今上岳阳楼). The verses "the waters around Dongting Lake are covered by steam, and the rolling waves shock Yueyang city" (气蒸云梦泽，波撼岳阳城) by Meng Haoran and "the vast waters cover an area of 500,000 metres (1,600,000 ft), and layer upon layer of mountains are as tall as 100 floors" (江国逾千里，山城仅百层) by Du Fu in the Tang dynasty, describe this place. However, it was Fan Zhongyan, an eminent minister of the Northern Song dynasty (960–1127), that really made Yueyang Tower world-famous. In the fifth year of the Qingli period, namely 1045, Fan Zhongyan was dismissed from his post of assistant administrator (参知政事) and demoted to Deng Prefecture (today's Deng county), Henan, because the reform viewpoint he proposed influenced the interests of the conservative party of the court. In the next year, Fan Zhongyan suddenly heard from his good friend Teng Zijing (滕子京). In the letter, Teng Zijing said he was demoted to Yueyang and served as magistrate. He planned to have Yueyang Tower rebuilt. So he invited Fan Zhongyan to write a memorial article. Painting Autumn Night by Dongting Lake (《洞庭秋晚图》) was also attached. After hearing from Teng Zijing, Fan Zhongyan had complex feelings. Unexpectedly, his good friend Teng Zijing also suffered the same hardship. He expressed his emotion with landscapes to console his good friend. At the same time, he also expressed his ideal wish: To be the first to worry and to be the last to enjoy pleasure in the world is our credo. On September 15 that year, Fan Zhongyan wrote down the eternally famous article Memorial to Yueyang Tower.

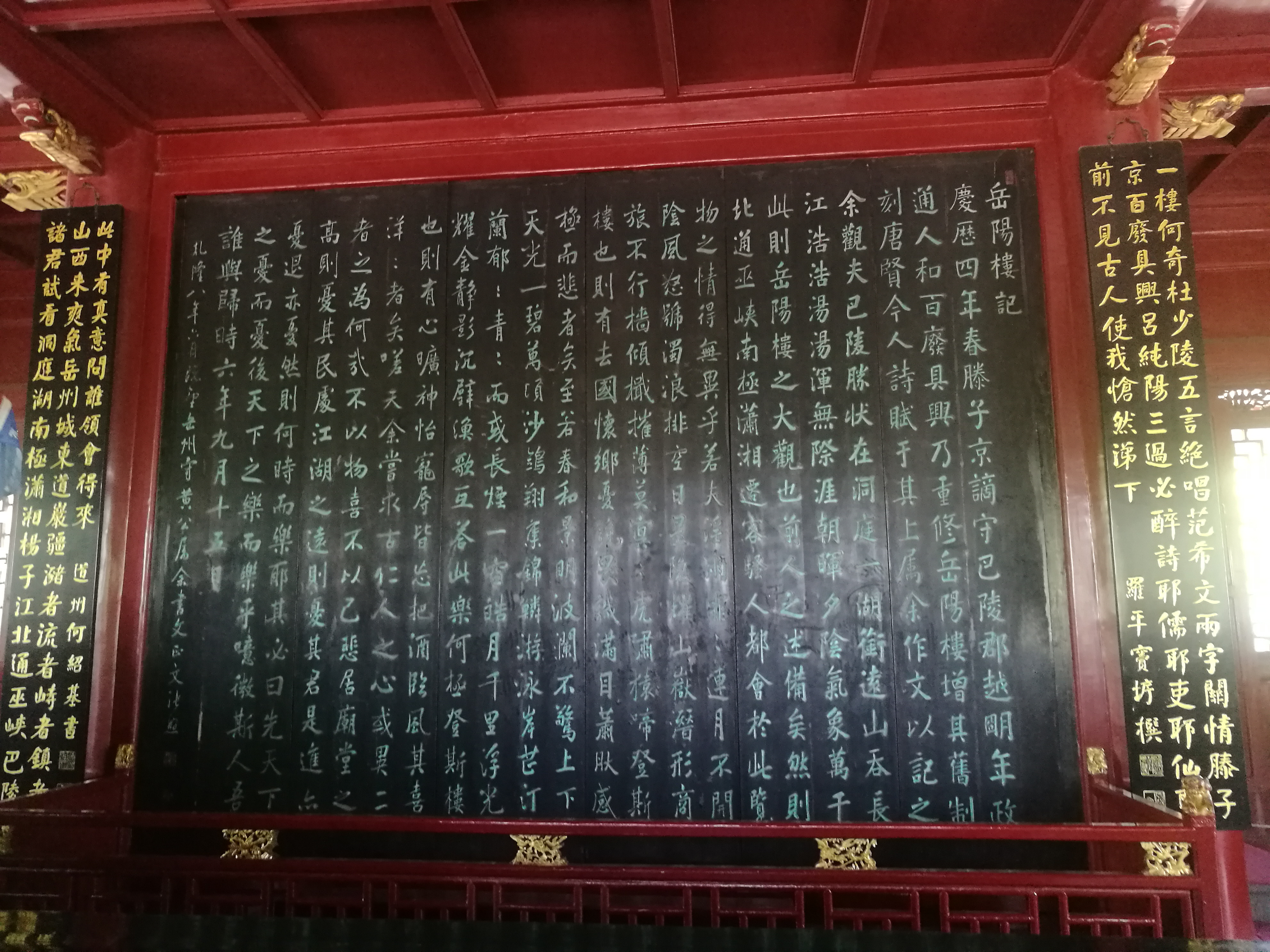
Wooden screen of Memorial to Yueyang Tower, drawn by calligrapher Zhang Zhao

Yueyang Tower is famous for Memorial to Yueyang Tower (《岳阳楼记》) written by Fan Zhongyan. Many calligraphers have reproduced Memorial to Yueyang Tower. Works by Su Shunqin, the ci poet and calligrapher of the Northern Song dynasty, are the most famous. The famed engraver Shao Song (邵竦), engraved the work on a wooden screen, but it was lost. During the Qianlong period of the Qing dynasty (1644–1911), Huang Ningdao (黄凝道), magistrate of Yueyang, decided to have a wooden screen of Memorial to Yueyang Tower engraved again. Just when Huang Ningdao tried hard to find a proper person to reproduce Memorial to Yueyang Tower, the calligrapher Zhang Zhao (张照), minister of the Ministry of Justice, was escorting army provisions in transportation via Yueyang. Huang Ningdao invited Zhang Zhao to re-engrave it. In the beginning, Zhang Zhao introduced Teng Zijing's recent situation and Yueyang Tower in formal regular script (正楷); he wrote in semi-cursive script (行书) to describe landscape in the middle part; and he wrote in the style between semi-cursive script and regular script (行楷) in the last part. Later, Huang Ningdao selected 12 pieces of best-quality rosewood for the screen and asked a carpenter to engrave Memorial to Yueyang Tower written by Zhang Zhao on the screen. Now, the engraved screen is inlaid in the hall of the second floor of Yueyang Tower.

== Architecture ==
According to the record in Baling County Annals (《巴陵县志》), its name is Yueyang, and it was first built in the Han and Jin dynasties (楼名岳阳，肇自汉晋). Since Yueyang Tower was built, it has enjoyed a history of over 1,700 years so far. It was destroyed and rebuilt amid wind and rain. The existing Yueyang Tower was built in the sixth year of the Guangxu period in the Qing dynasty (1644–1911), namely 1880. In 1983, according to the principle of remaining old as before (整旧如旧原则), it was pulled down for overhaul, and the original artistic style and architectural features of the Qing dynasty were kept.

The current Yueyang Tower is of pure wood structure. The main tower is 19.42 metres (63.7 ft) with three layers of overhanging eaves (三层飞檐). Four nanmu hypostyle columns in the tower go straight to the roof of the tower. To commemorate Lu Su, the famous general of Eastern Wu, the roof of Yueyang Tower is designed into a helmet roof held by a ruyi bracket system (如意斗拱盔顶式). The ruyi bracket system under a helmet roof is in the shape of a honeycomb, being dainty and exquisite. Three layers of overhanging eaves set off the helmet roof, looking like a roc spreading its wings, and flying up.

This roof structure is in the shape of a general's helmet, which is unique in ancient Chinese architecture. The helmet roof may be a nod to martial prowess and heroism.

== In folktale ==
Lü Dongbin Drunk at Yueyang Tower Three Times is a well-known Chinese Taoist tale often depicted in plays, novels, and other forms of art. It tells the story of Lü Dongbin, who helps two spirits, a willow and a plum, to become immortals. He reincarnated them as humans, had them marry, and tested their devotion through many difficult trials. The story recounts that Lü Dongbin visited Yueyang Tower and met the willow spirit, who wanted to become a god but was trapped in a wooden body. Lü Dongbin told the willow spirit to be reborn as a human, promising to return and help him after thirty years.

The willow spirit was reborn as Guo Maer, and the plum spirit as He Lamei. They grew up, married, and opened a teahouse below Yueyang Tower. Lü Dongbin visited Guo Maer twice, but Guo was unable to understand his guidance. On his third visit, Lü Dongbin instructed Guo Maer to kill his wife and become a monk. Though Guo Maer couldn't bring himself to do it, He Lamei still died, and he was blamed for her death. Later that day, Lü Dongbin returned and revealed that He Lamei was not truly dead. The judges then realized they were all immortals in disguise. Guo Maer learned he was the reincarnated willow spirit, and He Lamei the plum spirit. Together, they followed Lü Dongbin into the Dao and became immortals.

== Literature ==
Like the other two great towers of Jiangnan, Yueyang Tower is famous partly due to its literary associations. These include the piece Yueyang Lou Ji (《岳阳楼记》; 《岳陽樓記》, loosely translated as "Memorial to Yueyang Tower"), which was written by the renowned Song dynasty Chancellor and poet Fan Zhongyan (范仲淹) at the invitation of his friend Teng Zijing (滕子京, who in 1044 became local governor and rebuilt the tower) as well as the Yuan dynasty era play Yueyang Tower by Ma Zhiyuan, one of China's most eminent dramatists.

== Gallery ==
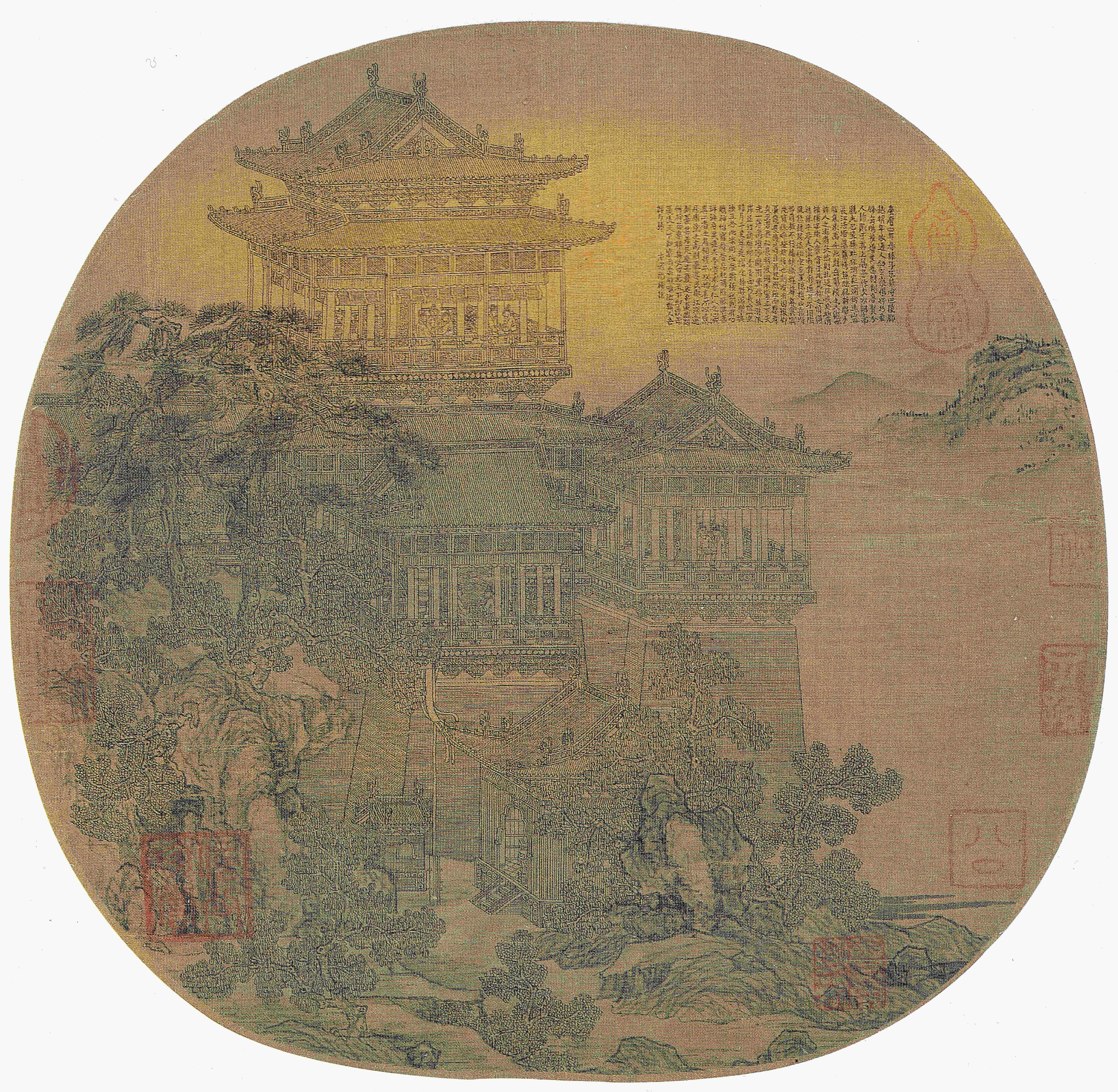
The Yueyang Tower by Li Sheng (fl. 908–925), Five Dynasties and Ten Kingdoms

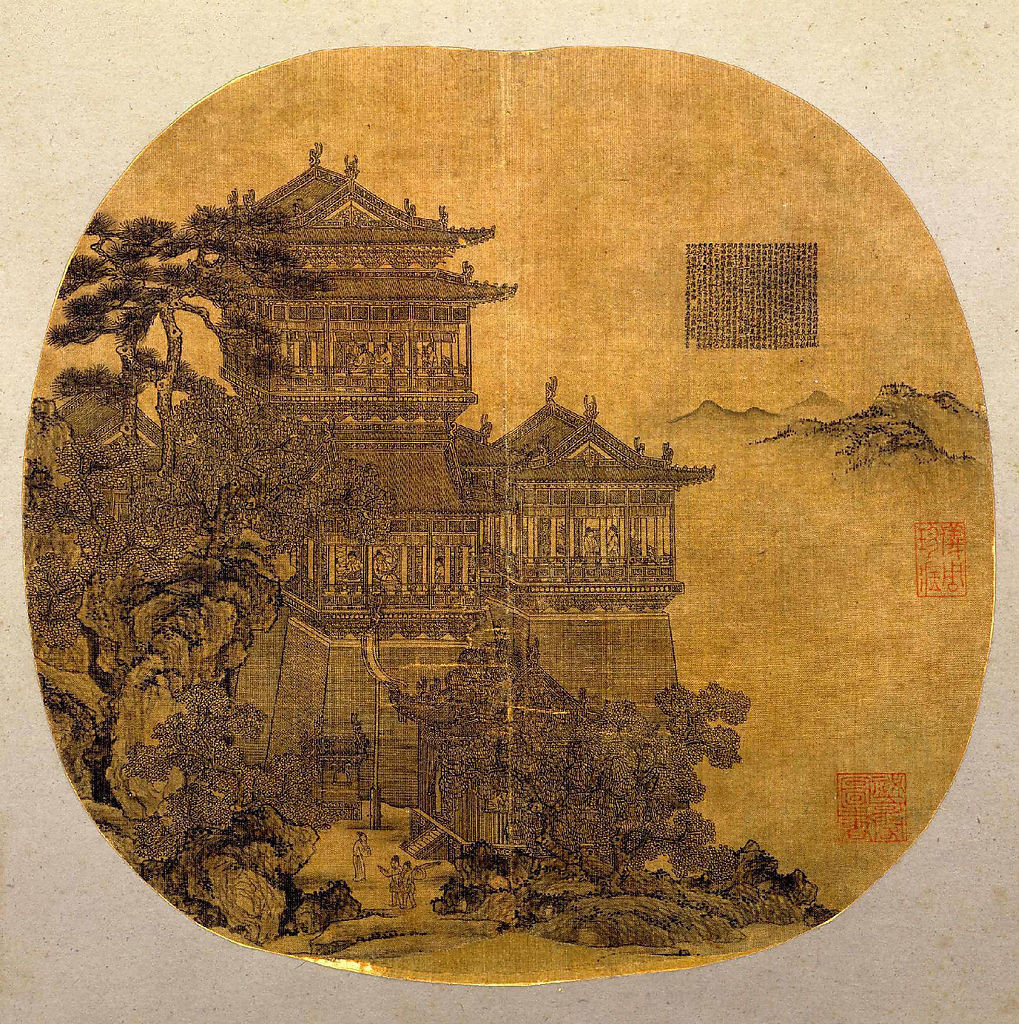
The Yueyang tower during the Yuan dynasty

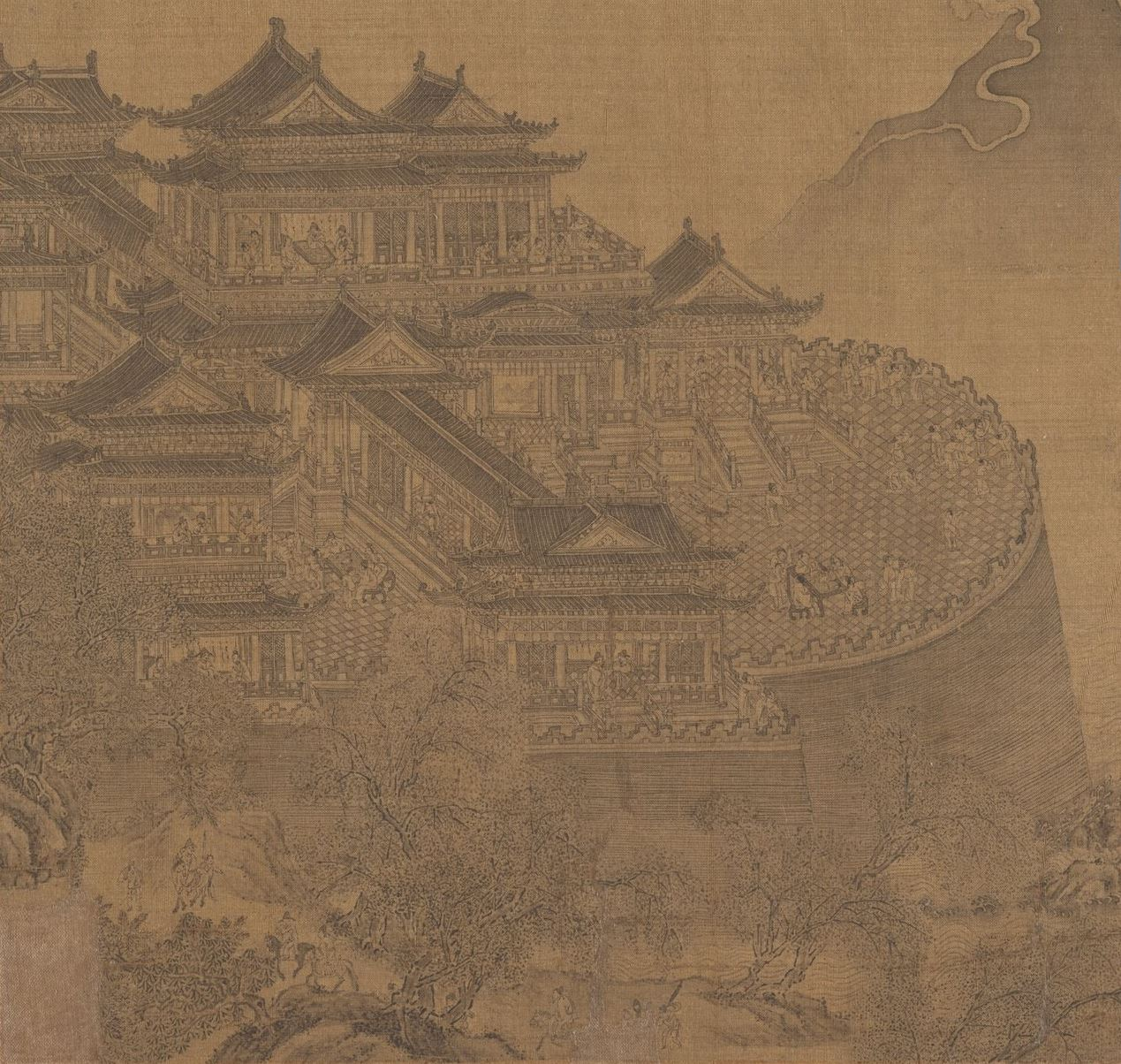
Lü Dongbin passing the Yueyang Tower by Xia Yong, Yuan dynasty

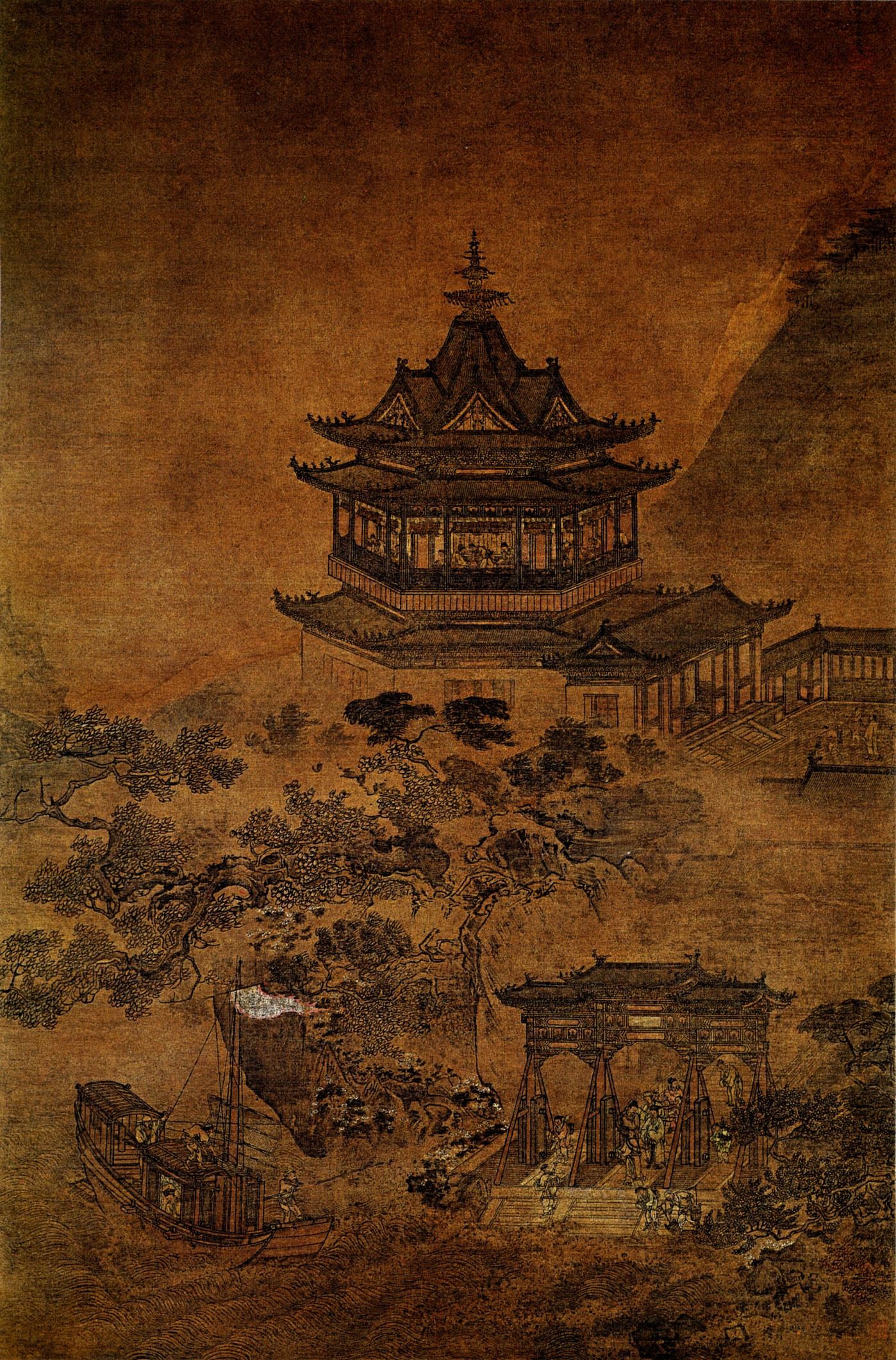
The Yueyang tower during the Ming dynasty

Japanese depiction of the Yueyang tower in the 18th century

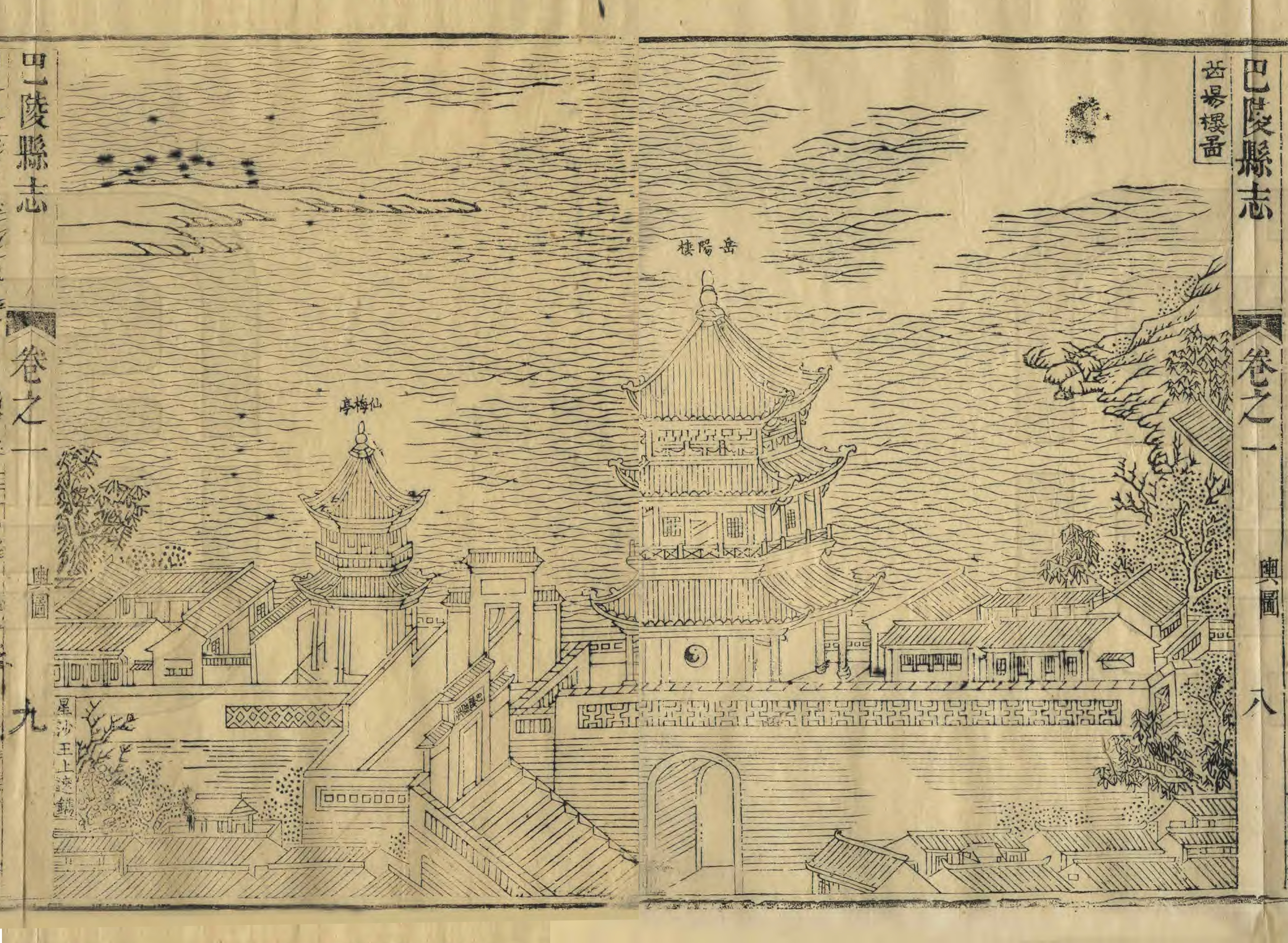
The Yueyang tower in 1804
