= Teng Zongliang =

Song dynasty person

Teng Zongliang (traditional Chinese: 滕宗諒; simplified Chinese: 滕宗谅; pinyin: Téng Zōngliàng, 991-1047), courtesy name Zijing (子京), a native of Luoyang, Henan, was an official during the northern Song dynasty. In his youth, he was known as a wandering knight-errant. He passed the imperial examination in the eighth year of the Dazhong Xiangfu era (1015). During his official tenure, he was impeached for using public funds to reward soldiers and was subsequently demoted to Baling prefecture, Hunan Province. Teng Zijing is known for his close friendship with the statesman and reformer Fan Zhongyan. Fan's frequently quoted essay "On the Yueyang Tower" was written to commemorate Teng's service in Baling and his reconstruction of the Yueyang Tower, a prominent landmark.

According to Song dynasty scholar Wang Bishi’s historical Biji collection Mianshui Yantanlu (澠水燕談錄), "Teng Zijing, after being exiled to Baling, governed so well that it was said to be the best administration in the country." The History of Song praised him, stating: "Zongliang was driven by a strong sense of honor, unconventional and self-assured, generous in giving, and when he passed away, he left no personal wealth behind."

== Life and career ==
In the eighth year of Dazhong Xiangfu era (1015), Teng Zongliang passed the imperial examination in the same year as Fan Zhongyan. He was appointed a military official of Taizhou and later promoted to serve as the county magistrate of Dangtu and Shaowu. During the early years of the Tiansheng period (1023-1032, specifically before 1031), Teng Zijing was assigned the chief judge of the Court of Judicial Review (大理寺丞, Dalisi Cheng). In the ninth year of Tiansheng (1031), he was demoted and sent to serve as the prefect of Shaowu in northern Fujian. The Book of Fujian (闽书, Minshu) written by He Qiaoyuan during the Ming dynasty remarked Teng as such: "He was once again appointed as the administrator of Shaowu, and he was known for being generous, enthusiastic about building schools, and had a bold and unrestrained character. He was upright and maintained no surplus wealth to himself."

At the recommendation of Fan Zhongyan, Teng was summoned to serve at the central court from 1032 to 1034, initially in charge of the emperor's daily affairs, then as a remonstrator. He was demoted to regional post again in 1034 for being outspoken on the emperor's excessive indulgence in his favored concubines.

Between 1040 and 1042, Teng Zijing was posted on the frontier to defend against Western Xia. In the 1042 Battle of Dingchuan Zhai (定川寨之战), the Song army suffered a major defeat, with General Ge Huaimin killed in action. In the aftermath, Teng Zijing mobilized local farmers to defend the city gates and recruited courageous soldiers to scout enemy movements. With both the soldiers and townspeople dispirited and fearful, Teng organized a grand feast to reward the troops with meat and wine, and generously compensated the families of the fallen. Impressed by these actions, Fan Zhongyan recommended Teng Zijing for the post of Governor of Qingzhou.

In the eighth month of the third year of the Qingli era, Fan Zhongyan was appointed as Vice Chancellor to implement the Qingli Reforms. In the following month, Zheng Jian, the head of the Shaanxi regional command, impeached Teng Zongliang for misappropriation of public funds in Jingzhou, accusing him of "purchasing cattle and donkeys at low prices in Jingzhou," "indulging in feasts and entertainment in Binzhou for several days," and "spending 160,000 strings of public cash after assuming office, without accountable book keeping." Fan Zhongyan defended Teng against these accusations. The court dispatched Yan Du to investigate. Yan Du, seemingly intent on aggravating charges against Teng Zongliang, complicated the investigation, resulting in overcrowded jails and widespread complaints. In an effort to curb further inquiries and reduce the number of potential defendants, Teng Zongliang openly destroyed the financial records. Subsequently, Teng was demoted to serve as Governor of Fengxiang Prefecture (now within Baoji, Shaanxi) and later further demoted to Guozhou (now within Lingbao, Henan).

The Deputy Censor-in-Chief, Wang Gongchen, submitted a memorial to the throne, arguing that "the punishment for Teng, who misappropriated public funds, is too light". Wang even declared to the emperor that if the matter were not handled in accordance with the law, he would resign. As a result, the emperor, who initially intended a more lenient judgment, demoted Teng Zongliang to Baling Prefecture in Yuezhou (modern-day Yueyang, Hunan) in the spring of the fourth year of the Qingli reign (1044). During his three-year tenure in Yuezhou, Teng Zongliang issued a proclamation to private lenders, stating that, upon paying a certain fee, the government would pursue debt collection from borrowers who had failed to repay. Many lenders entrusted the matter to the government, which collected 10,000 strings of cash and used it to renovate the Yueyang Tower. According to the county chronicles, the newly constructed tower was grand and magnificent. Teng Zongliang then wrote a letter to Fan Zhongyan, requesting that he compose a commemorative inscription for the tower. Teng also enclosed a painting titled "Autumn Evening on Dongting Lake". In response, Fan Zhongyan penned the celebrated essay, "On the Yueyang Tower", a masterpiece that would become widely known and highly esteemed by future generations.

In the seventh year of the Qingli reign (1047 AD), Teng Zongliang was reassigned to Suzhou. Three months later, he died while serving in Suzhou at the age of 57. He was buried in Suzhou, but his descendants later relocated his grave to south of Qingyang County in Anhui Province.

== See also ==
- Fan Zhongyan
- Yueyang Tower
- Western Xia (1038-1048)
