= Xia Yong =

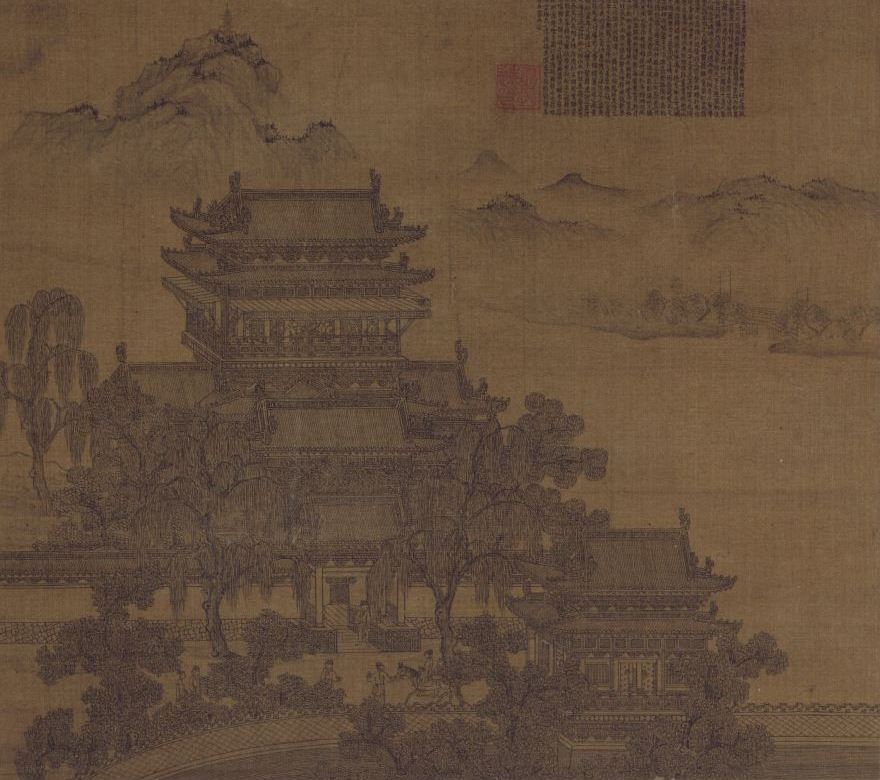
Fengle lou

Xia Yong (Chinese: 夏永; pinyin: Xià Yǒng; Wade–Giles: Hsia Yung); was a mid 14th century Chinese painter who lived during the late Yuan dynasty. His specific dates of birth and death are not known. Most of the information on his origins comes from an inscription on the painting of Yueyang Tower.

Xia Yong, style name "Ming Yuan" (明远), was a native of Qian Tang (钱塘, the present day Hangzhou) in the Zhejiang province. He is known for his paintings of palaces and temples. His painting style is based on that of Wang Zhenpeng.

== Notable Works of Xia Yong ==
- 岳阳楼 ("Yueyang Tower")
- 黄鹤楼 ("Yellow Crane Tower")
- 滕王阁 ("Pavilion of Prince Teng")

== Gallery ==
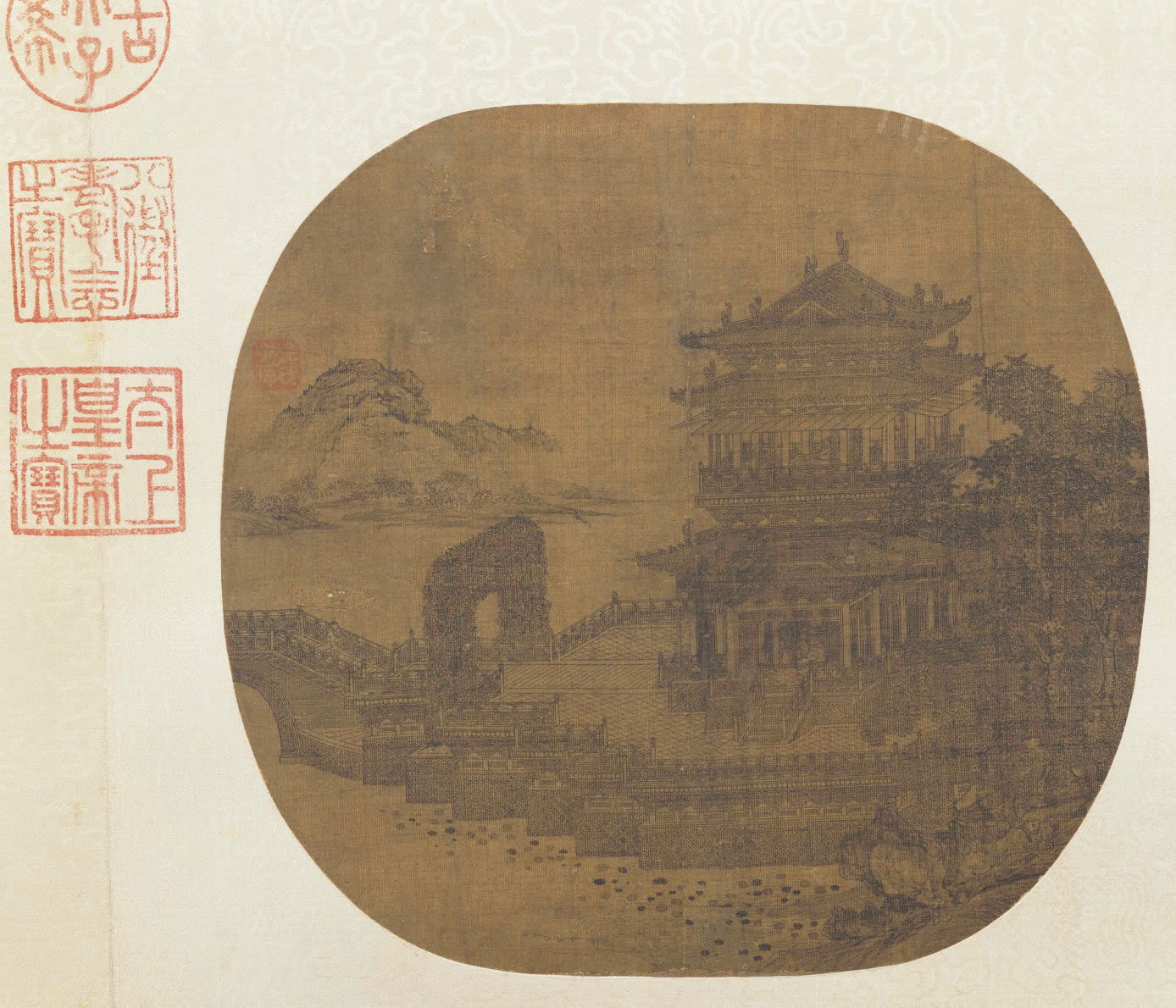
Yingshui Loutai

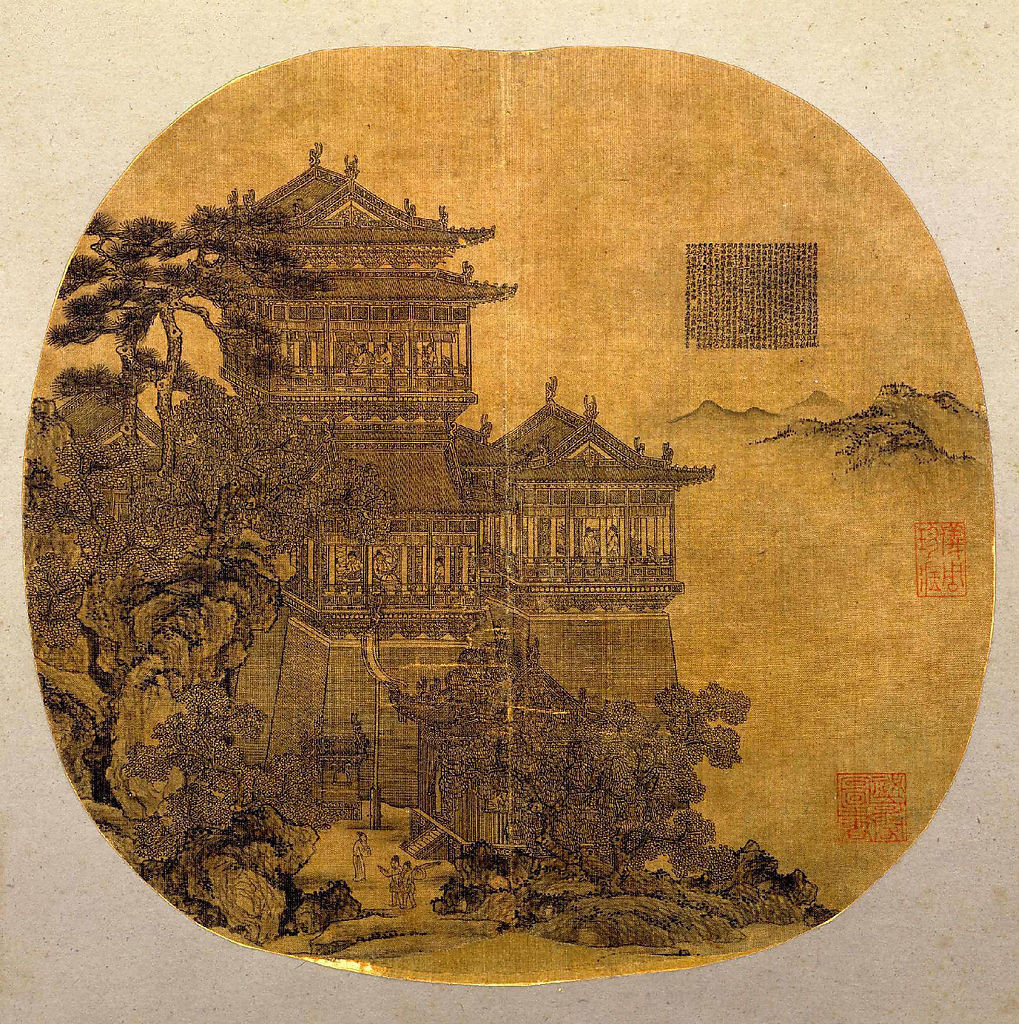
Yueyang Tower

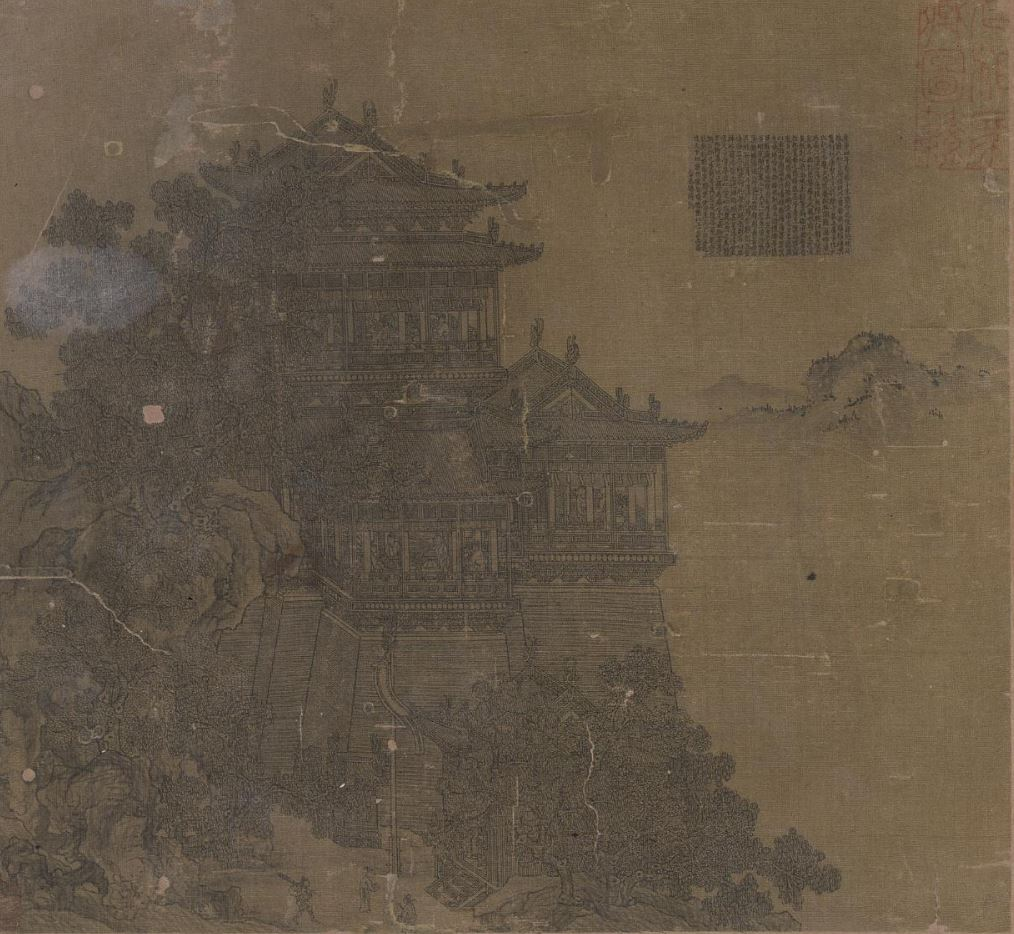
Yueyang Tower

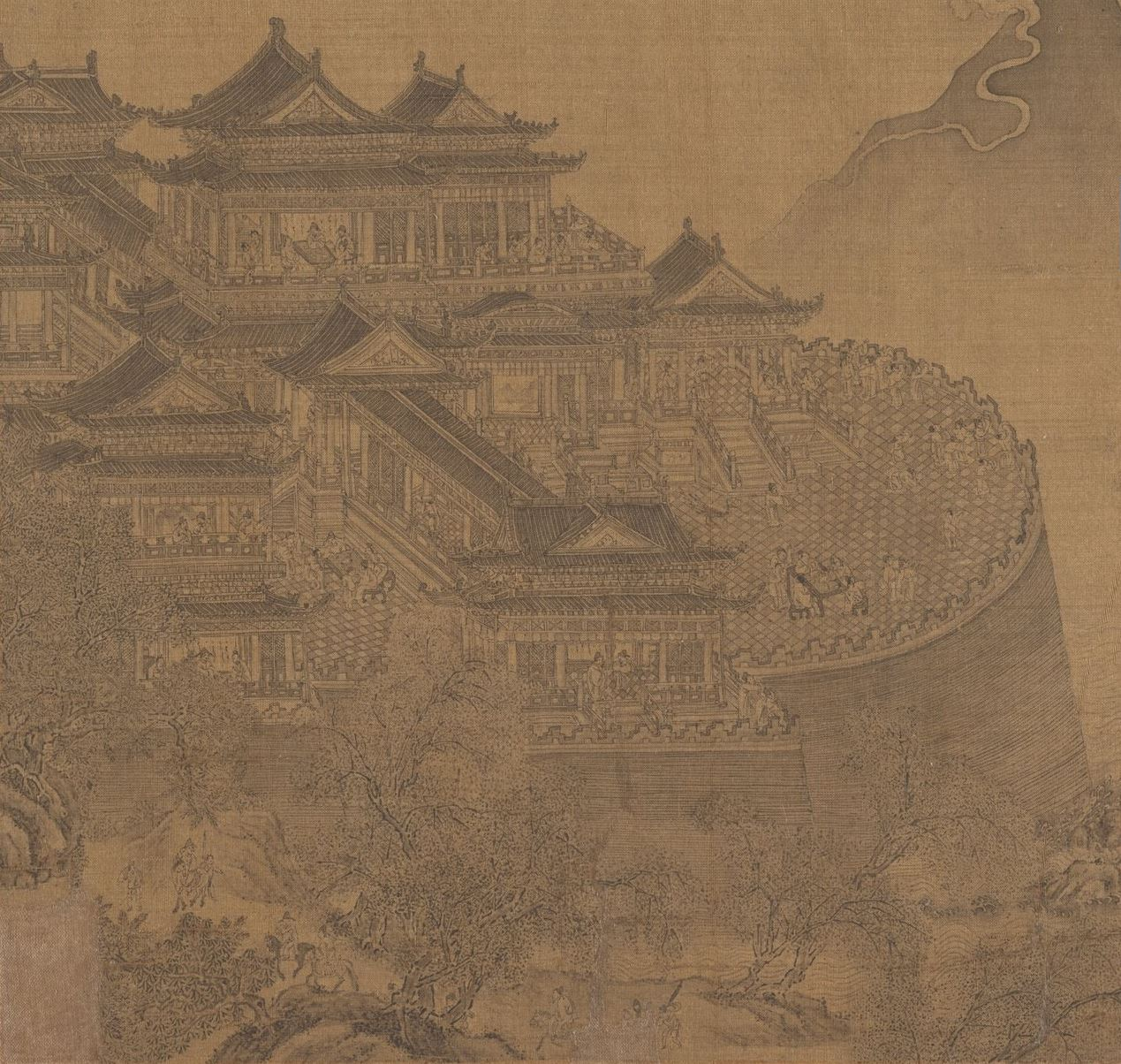
Lü Dongbin passing Yueyang Tower

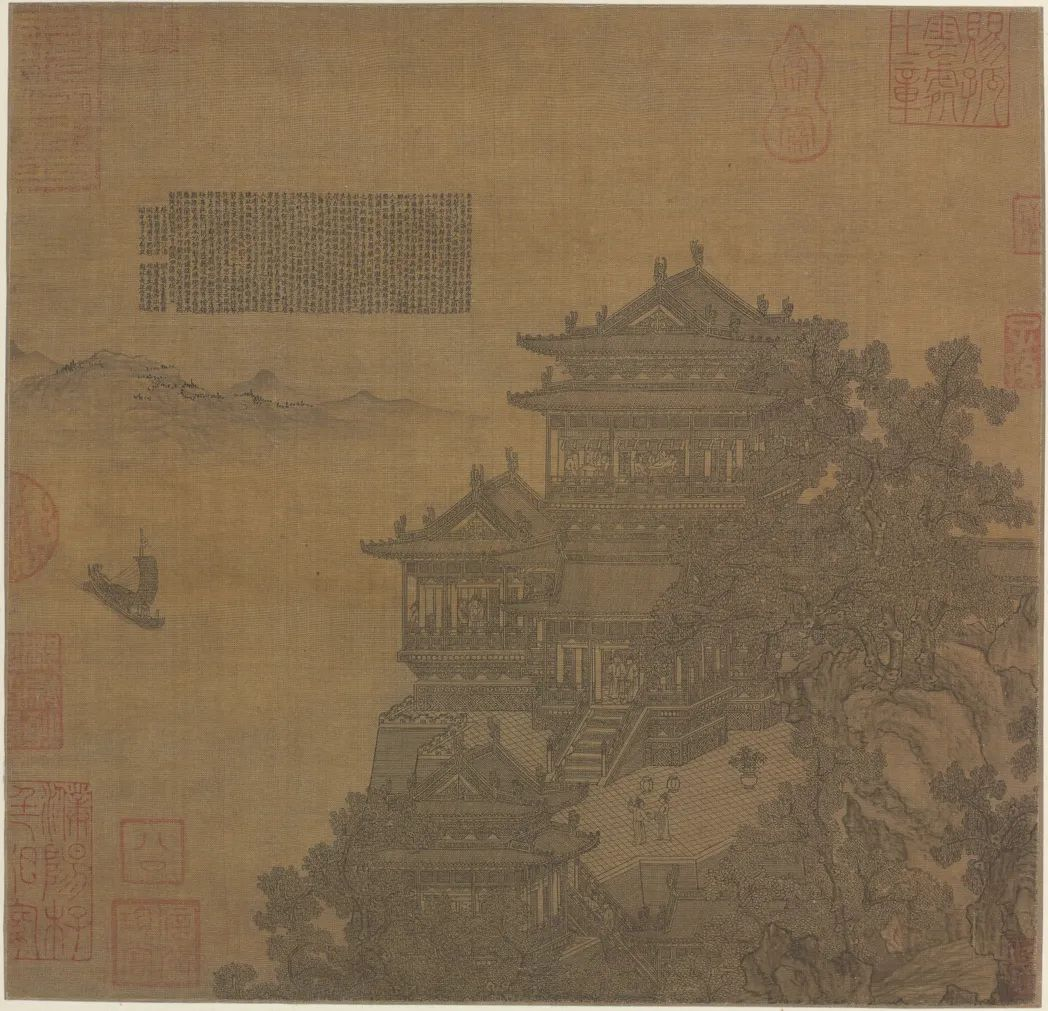
Pavilion of Prince Teng

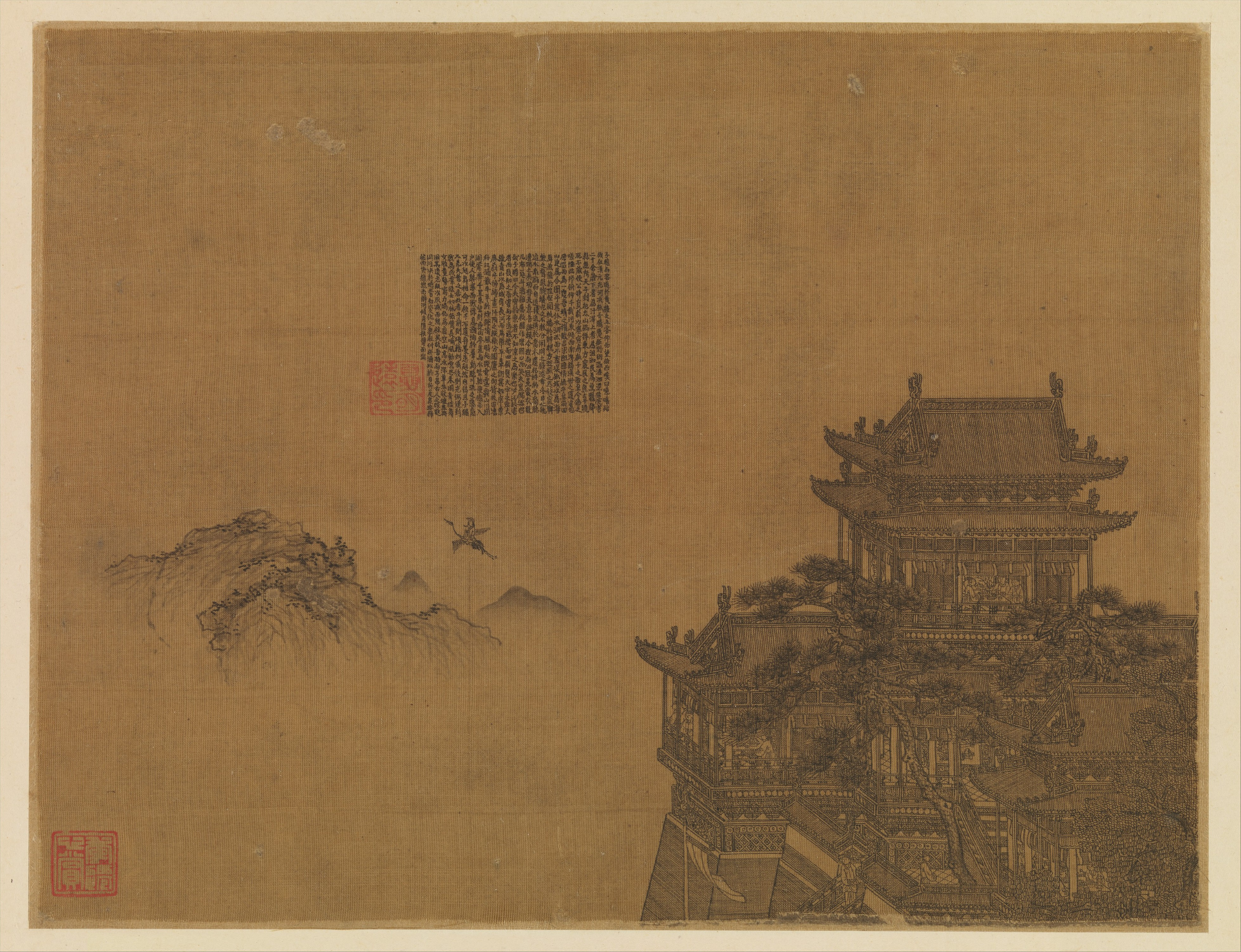
The Yellow Tower

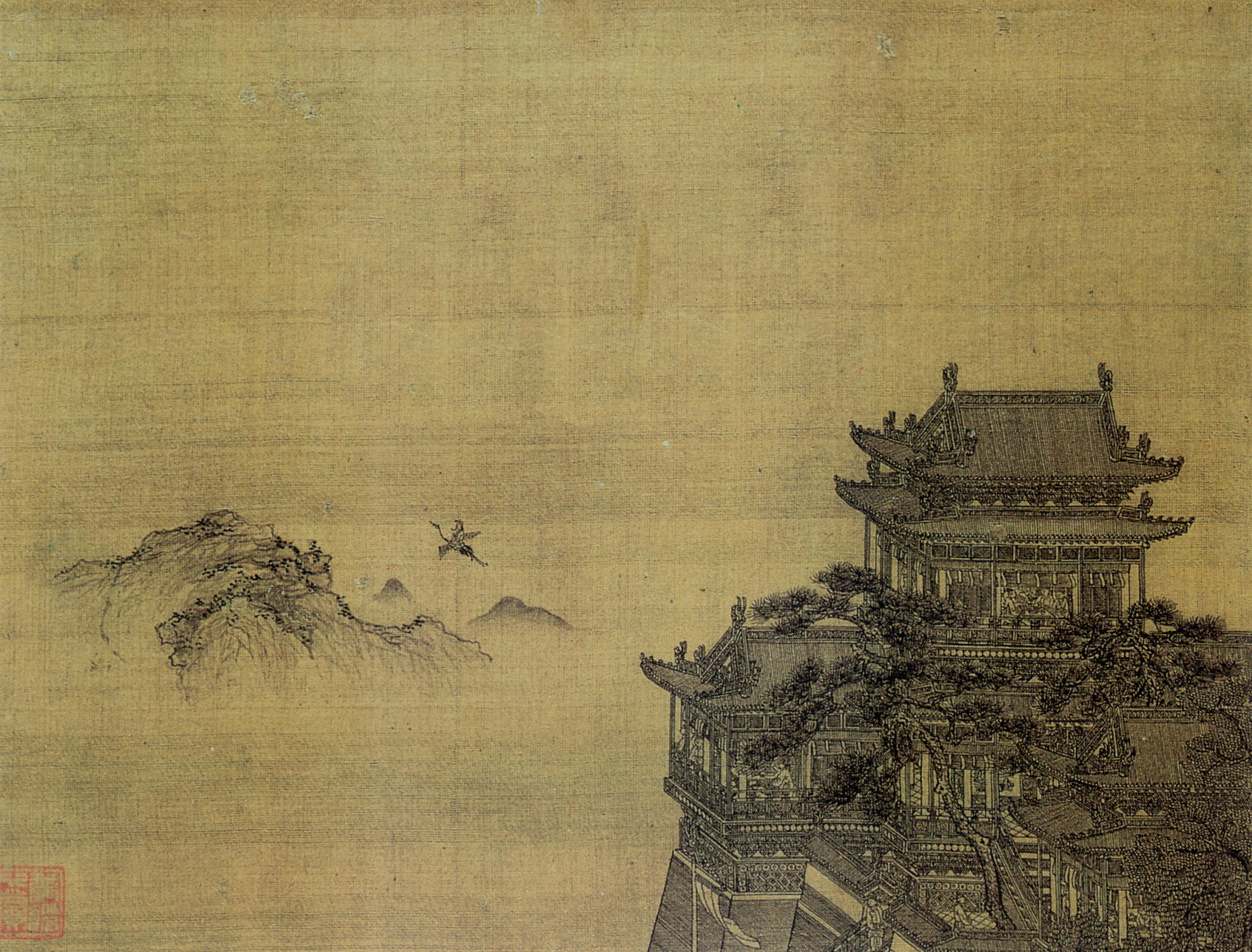
Yellow Crane Tower
