= Pavilion of Prince Teng =

Tower in Nanchang, China

Coordinates: 28°41′2.76″N 115°52′32.88″E

- "Pavilion of Prince Teng" in Simplified (top) and Traditional (bottom) Chinese characters
- Traditional Chinese: 滕王閣
- Simplified Chinese: 滕王阁
Transcriptions
Standard Mandarin
- Hanyu Pinyin: Téngwáng Gé
- IPA: [tʰə̌ŋ.wǎŋ kɤ̌]
Yue: Cantonese
- Yale Romanization: Tàhng-wòhng gok
- Jyutping: Tang^{4} Wong^{4} Gok^{3}
- IPA: [tʰɐŋ˩.wɔŋ˩ kɔk̚˧]

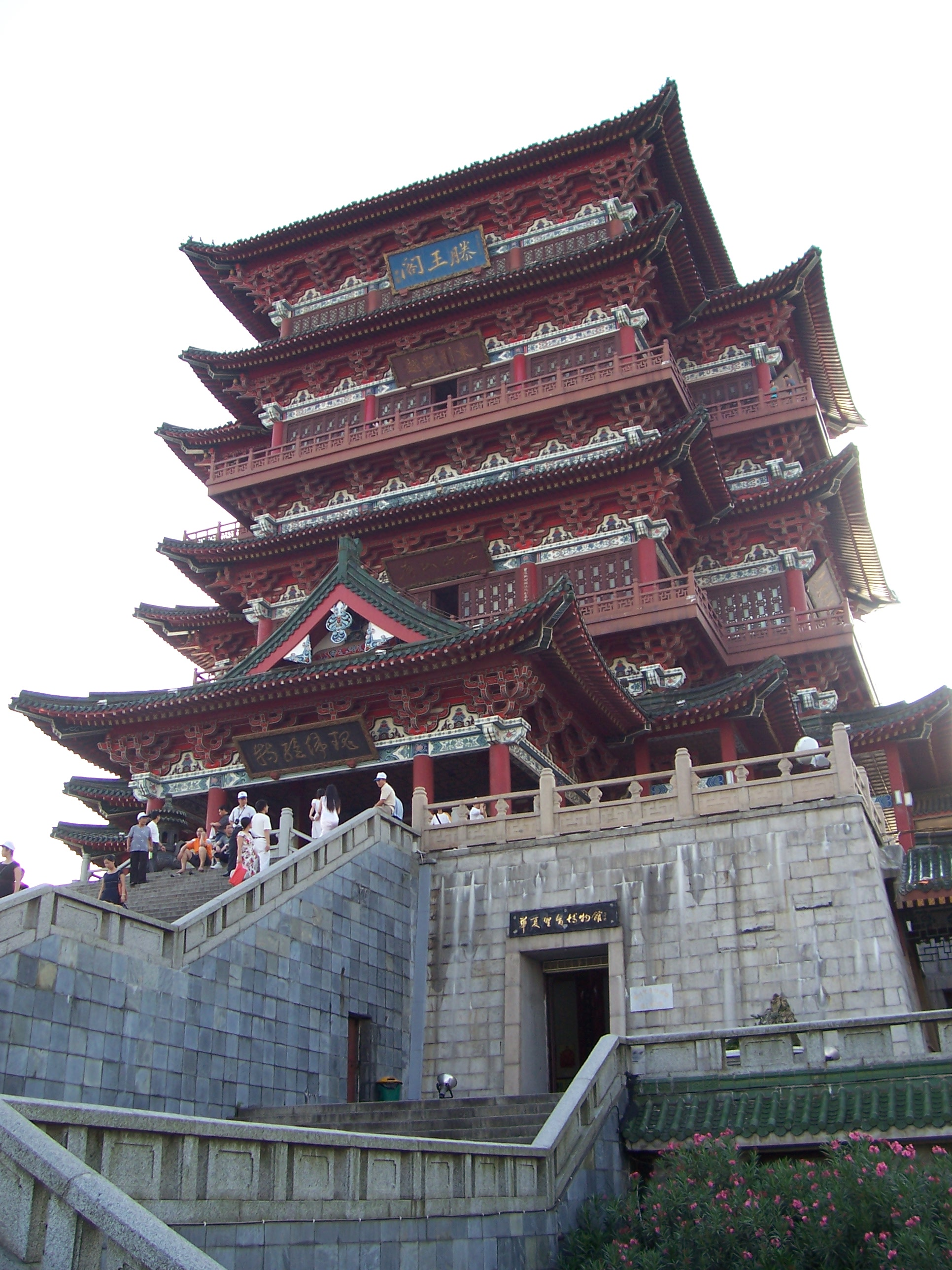
Front view of the reconstructed Pavilion of Prince Teng

The Pavilion of Prince Teng (traditional Chinese: 滕王閣; simplified Chinese: 滕王阁; pinyin: Téngwáng Gé) is a building in the North West of the city of Nanchang, in Jiangxi province, China, on the east bank of the Gan River and is one of the Three Great Towers of southern China. The other two are the Yueyang Tower and the Yellow Crane Pavilion. It has been destroyed and rebuilt many times over its history. The present building was rebuilt in 1989 on the original site. The rebuilding plan was devised by the architect Liang Sicheng, and now the Pavilion of Prince Teng is the landmark of Nanchang. There are nine floors in total. The main architectural structure is in Song dynasty wooden style, showing the magnificence of the Pavilion.

== History ==
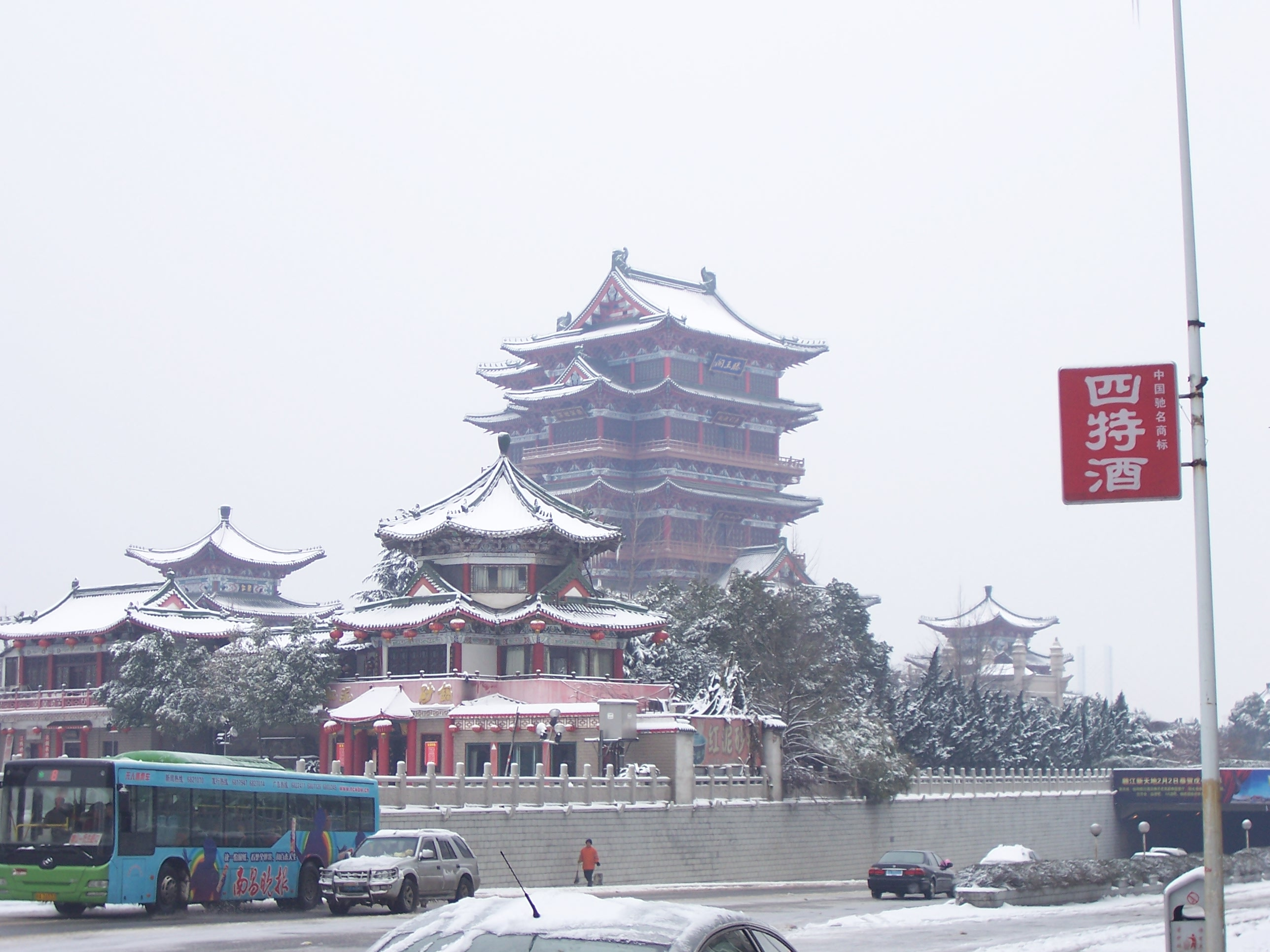
The Pavilion in winter.

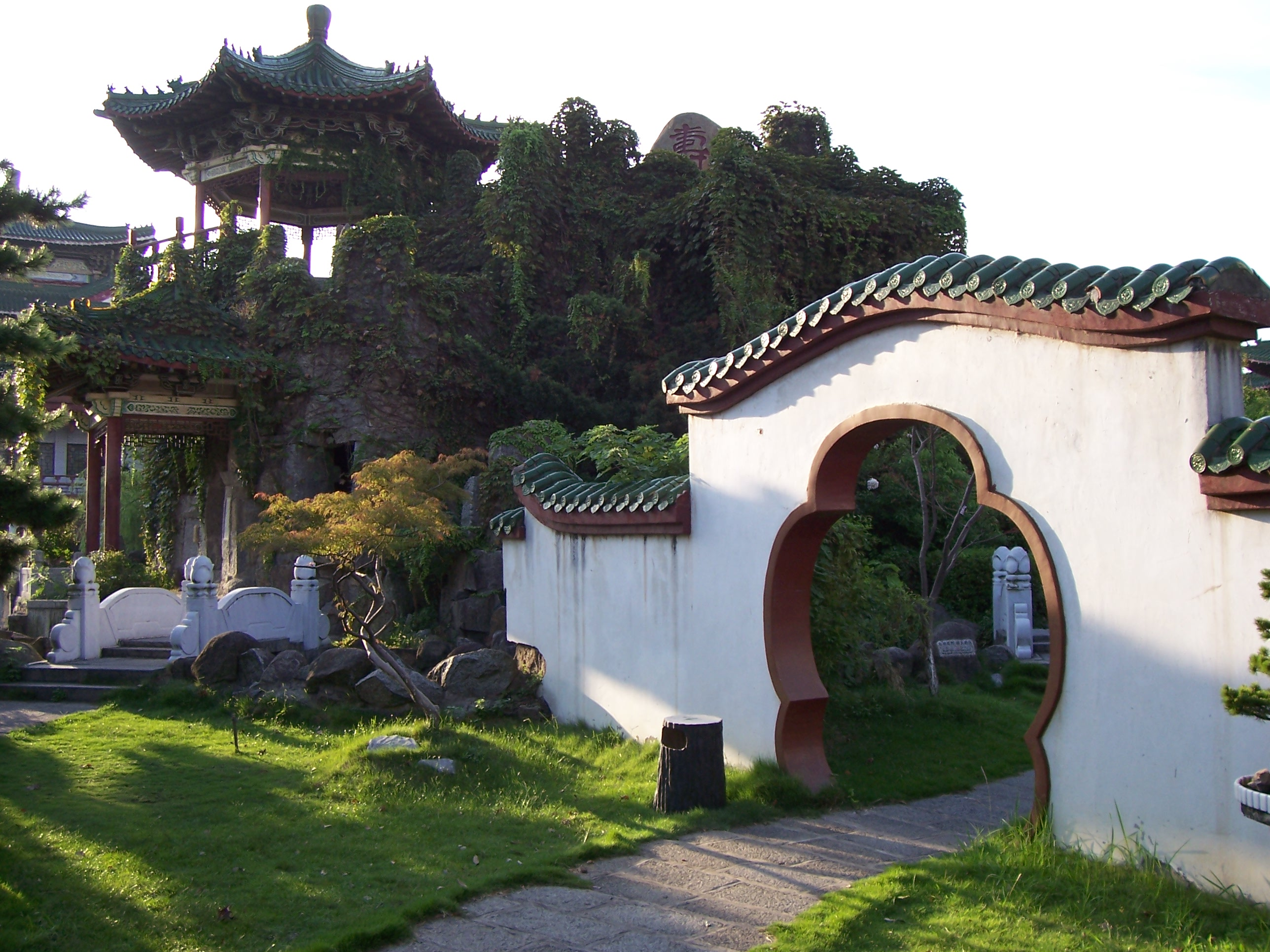
The pavilion grounds.

The Pavilion of Prince Teng was first built in 653 AD, by Li Yuanying, the younger brother of Emperor Taizong of Tang and uncle of Emperor Gaozong of Tang. Li Yuanying was enfeoffed as Prince Teng in 639 and spent his early years in Suzhou. In 652 he was assigned the governorship of Nanchang where the pavilion served as his townhouse. Twenty years later, the building was rebuilt by the new governor. Upon its completion, a group of local intelligentsia gathered to compose prose and poetry about the building. The most famous of these is the Preface to the Pavilion of Prince Teng by Wang Bo. This piece made the Pavilion of Prince Teng a household name in China down to the present day.

The Pavilion was subsequently destroyed and rebuilt a total of 29 times over the next centuries. The building itself changed shape and function many times. The penultimate construction was during the Tongzhi era of the Qing Dynasty. That building was destroyed in October 1926 during the chaotic Warlord Era.

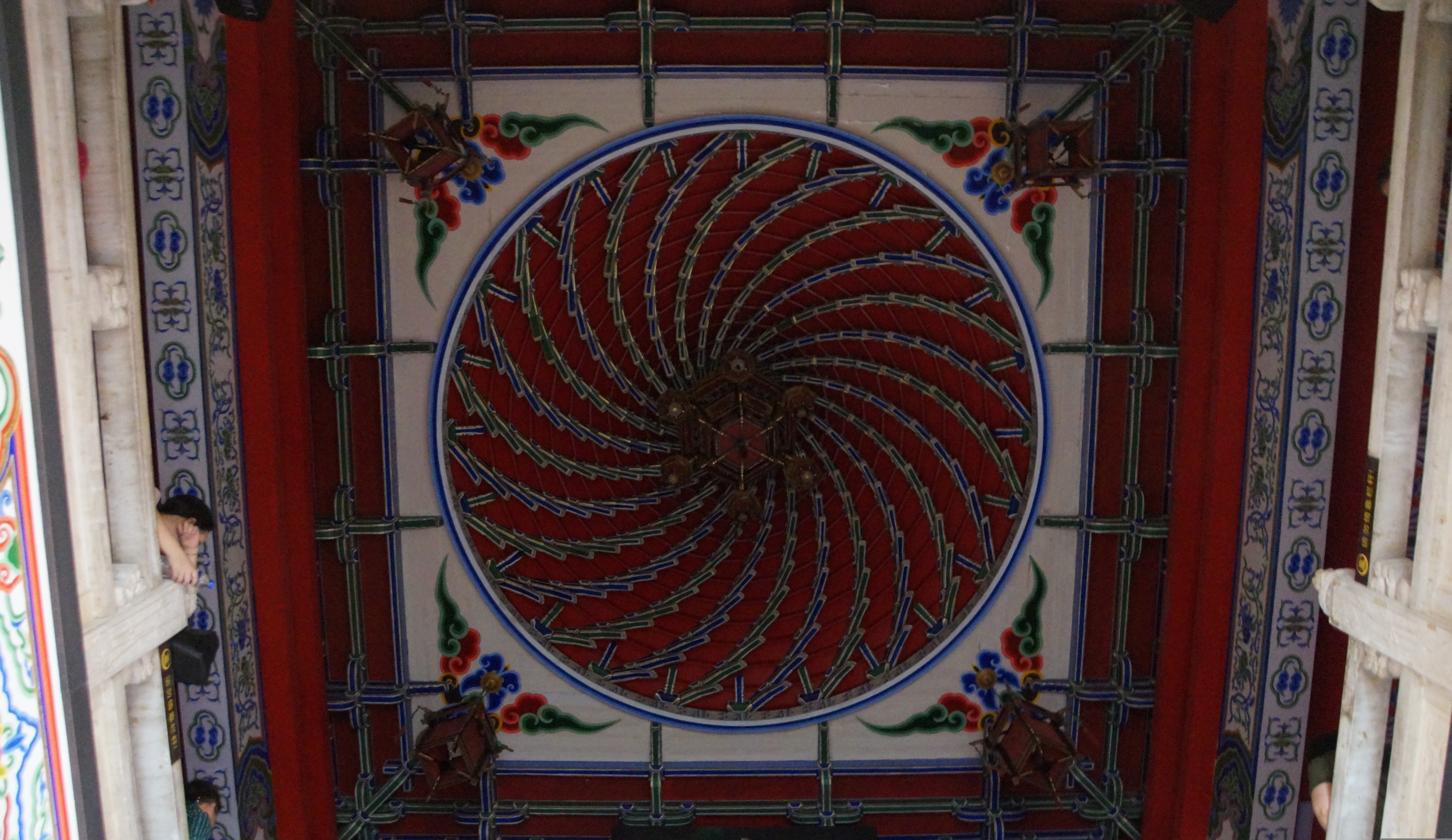
Yueyang Tower caisson.

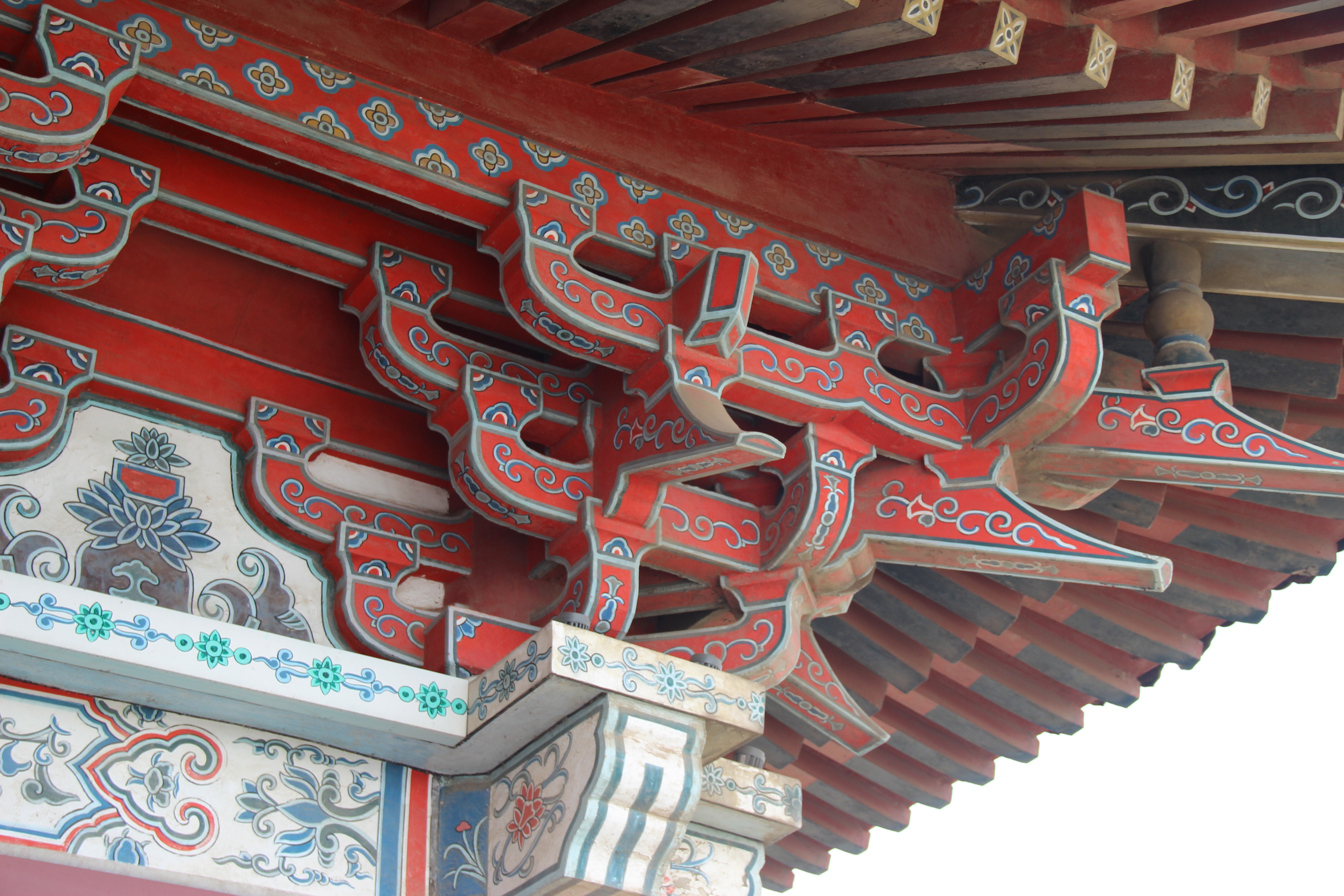
Caihua-decorations, inspired by Song dynasty's decorations as detailed in Yingzao Fashi.

== Recent ==
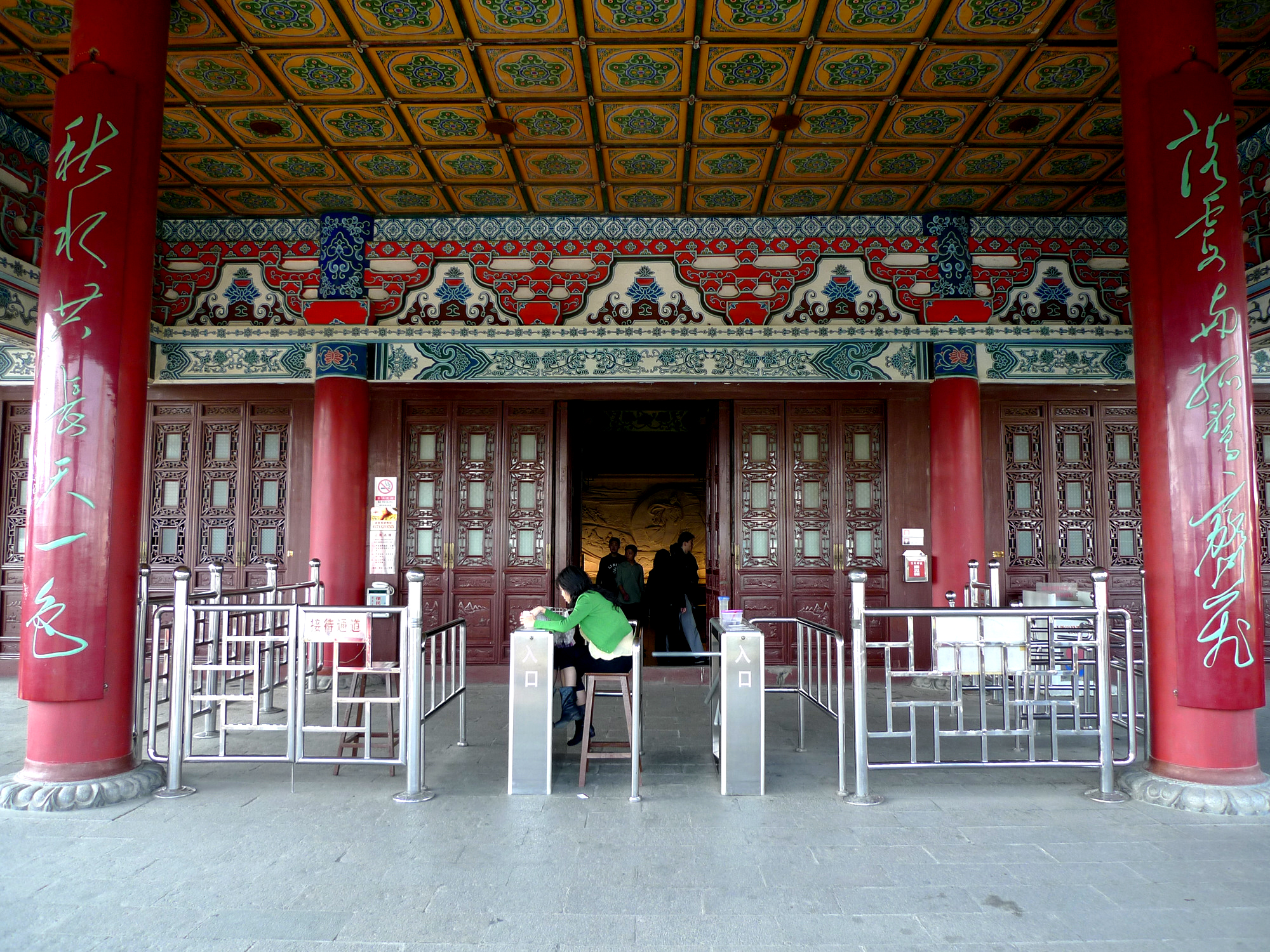
Calligraphy of Mao Zedong in its entrance hall

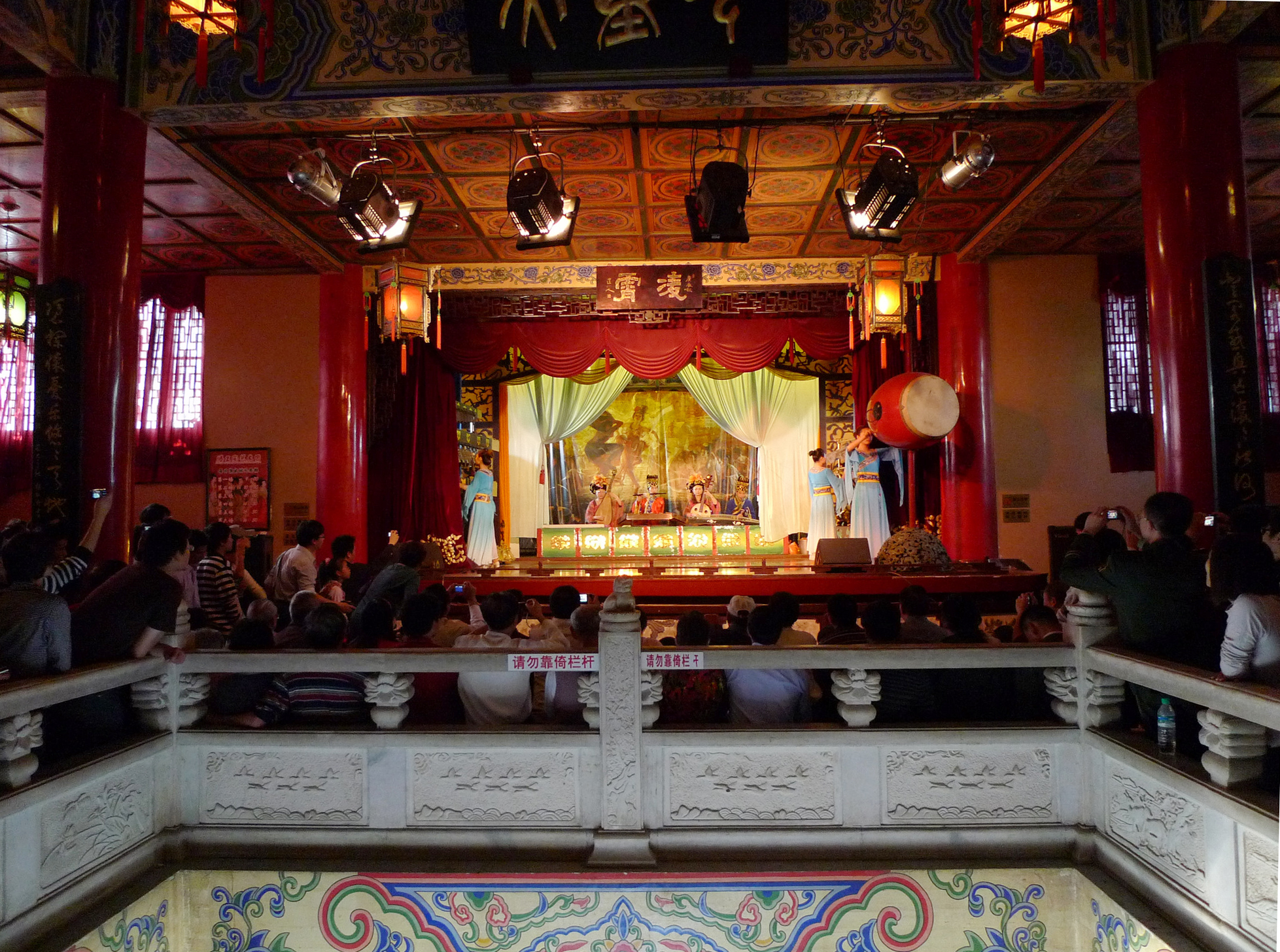
Theater stage

The present Pavilion of Prince Teng was built according to the design of architect Liang Sicheng, and was completed on 8 October 1989; now a landmark of Nanchang. The building is of reinforced concrete, but decorated in Song Dynasty style. It is 57.5 meters (189 ft) tall and has nine stories. The building has a total floor area of 13,000 square meters (140,000 sq ft).

The building sits atop a 12-meter (39 ft) tall concrete platform, which symbolizes the now-destroyed ancient city wall. A stainless steel tablet at the entrance is engraved with a calligraphy work of Mao Zedong: 「落霞与孤鹜齐飞，秋水共长天一色。」 ("Falling sunset and lone goose flying together; a single hue, autumn water and the long stretch of sky."), a quotation from Preface to the Pavilion of Prince Teng.

The garden was also built in 1989. The building mainly serves as a tourist attraction. Apart from internal decoration, attractions include a theater that stages performances of period music and displays of reconstructed ancient instruments. There are some restaurants and souvenir shops. The streets around the pavilion have been designed to conform with its style. This area has become the epicenter of Nanchang's antiques trade.

== Influences ==
The Pavilion of Prince Teng achieved national fame through the Preface to the Pavilion of Prince Teng. As a result, it was endowed by later generations with almost legendary status as an example of magnificent architecture. When the Forbidden City was built, its corner towers were built to imitate the Pavilion of Prince Teng and the Yellow Crane Pavilion as depicted in Song Dynasty paintings. (Strangely, both pavilions are depicted identically in surviving paintings.) These uniquely structured corner towers remain some of the most valued architectural treasures of the Forbidden City. The Pavilion of Prince Teng was very highly regarded in several dynasties during the history of China. It also served as an ancient library, storing a large number of precious scriptures and poems.

== Construction timeline ==
According to Wang:

Year	Event
653	Constructed
675	Reconstructed
790	Reconstructed
820	Reconstructed
848	Reconstructed after being destroyed in a fire
1108	Reconstructed. Smaller structures added to the north and south of the main pavilion. The northern structure is named "Pulling Emerald-Green Pavilion" (Chinese: 挹翠亭; pinyin: Yì Cuì Tíng) and the southern structure is named "Pressing River Pavilion" (Chinese: 压江亭; pinyin: Yā Jiāng Tíng).
1294	Placed on top of the city walls after being damaged several times during wars.
1336	Reconstruction started in 1334 and completed in 1336
1436	Reconstructed after sinking into the river. It is renamed "Greeting Kindness Hall" (Chinese: 迎恩堂; pinyin: Yíng Ēn Táng).
1452	Reconstructed after being destroyed in a fire. It is renamed "Number 1 Building in Xi Jiang" (Chinese: 西江第一楼; pinyin: Xī Jiāng Dí Yì Lóu).
1468	Reconstructed after it collapses. Its original name restored.
1527	Reconstructed after being destroyed earlier in the Chen Hao Uprising (Chinese: 宸濠之乱; pinyin: Chén Háo zhi Luàn).
1599	Reconstructed after being near collapse.
1616	Reconstructed after being destroyed in a fire.
1634	Reconstruction starts in 1633 and completes the following year.
1648	Destroyed when it catches fire while defending Ming generals torch surrounding area to open a clear perimeter against advancing Qing troops.
1654	Reconstructed
1679	Reconstructed after being destroyed in a fire.
1682	Reconstructed after being destroyed in a fire.
1685	Reconstructed after being destroyed in a fire.
1702	Reconstructed
1706	Reconstructed after being destroyed in a fire.
1731	Destroyed in a fire
1736	Reconstructed
1743	Reconstructed and again renamed "Number 1 Building in Xi Jiang".
1788	Reconstructed after it collapses.
1805	Reconstructed
1812	Reconstructed
1847	Reconstructed twice after multiple fires.
1853	Destroyed with much of Nanchang in a three-day fire during Tai Ping Rebellion attack.
1873	Reconstruction started in 1872 and completed the following year.
1909	Reconstructed after being destroyed in a fire.
1926	Destroyed by defenders when Nanchang is attacked by the Northern Expedition.
1935	An attempt to reconstruct is halted due to the Japanese invasion.
1985	Reconstructed
1991	The smaller buildings "Pulling Emerald-Green Pavilion" and "Pressing River Pavilion" are restored.

== Gallery ==
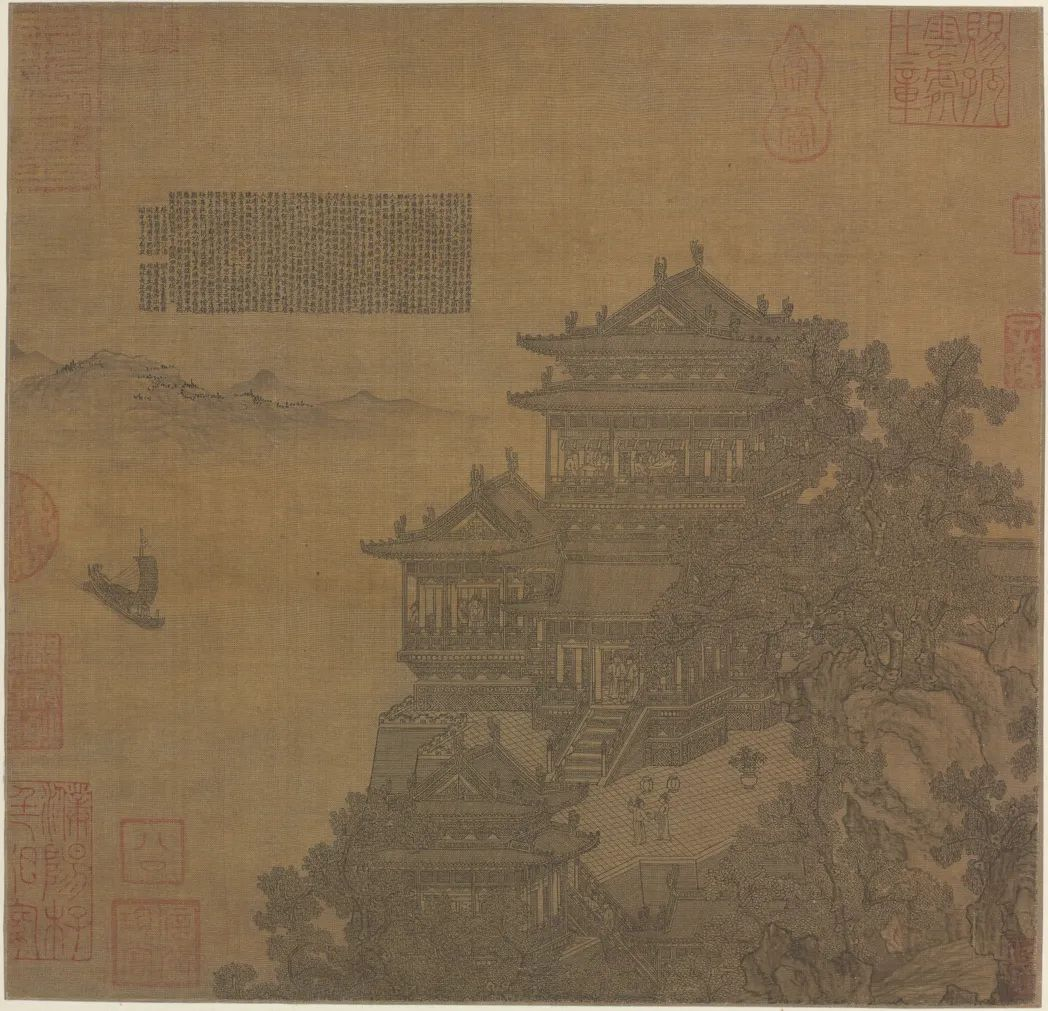
Prince Teng Pavilion by Xia Yong, Yuan dynasty

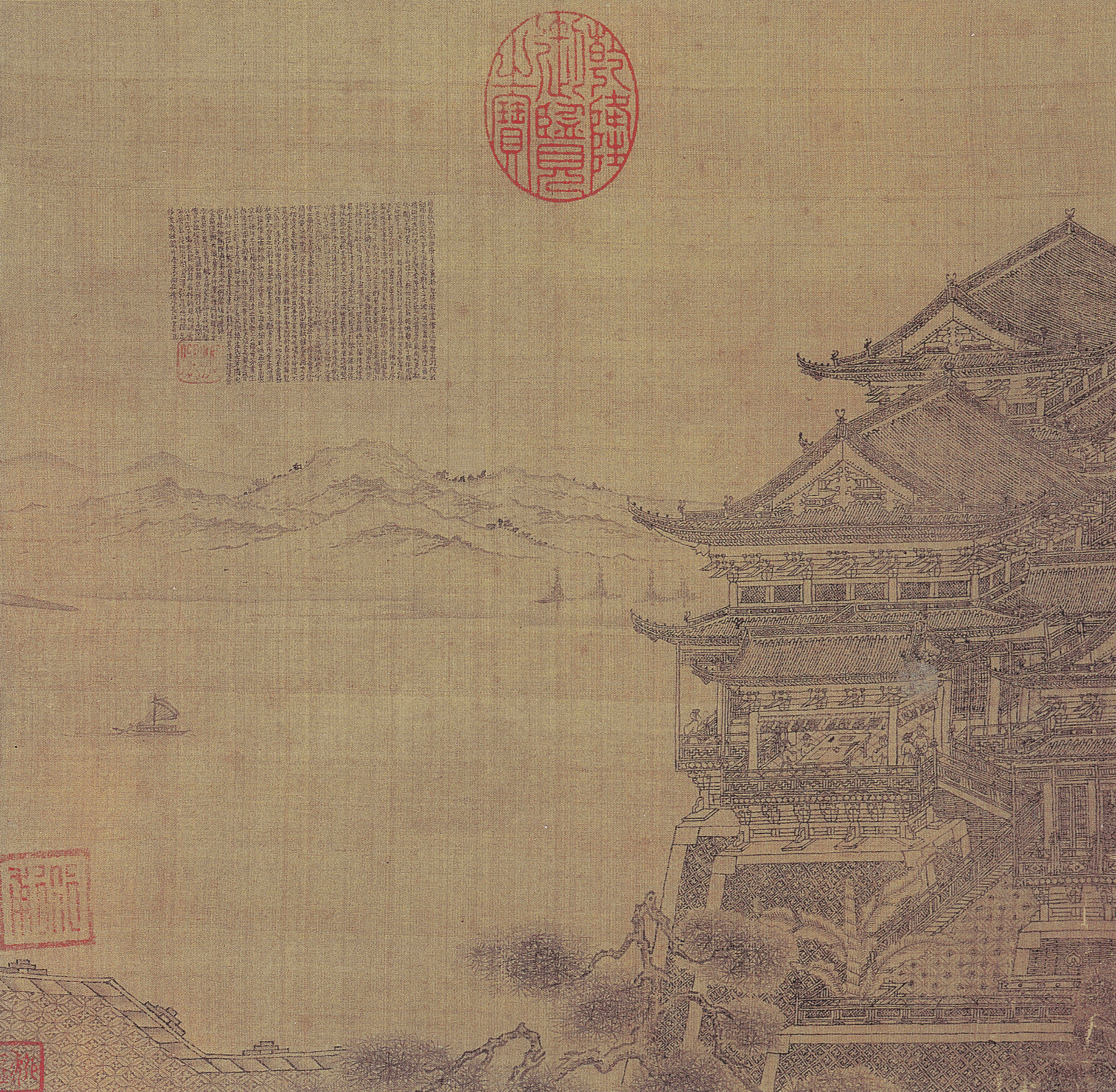
Prince Teng Pavilion by anonymous, Yuan dynasty

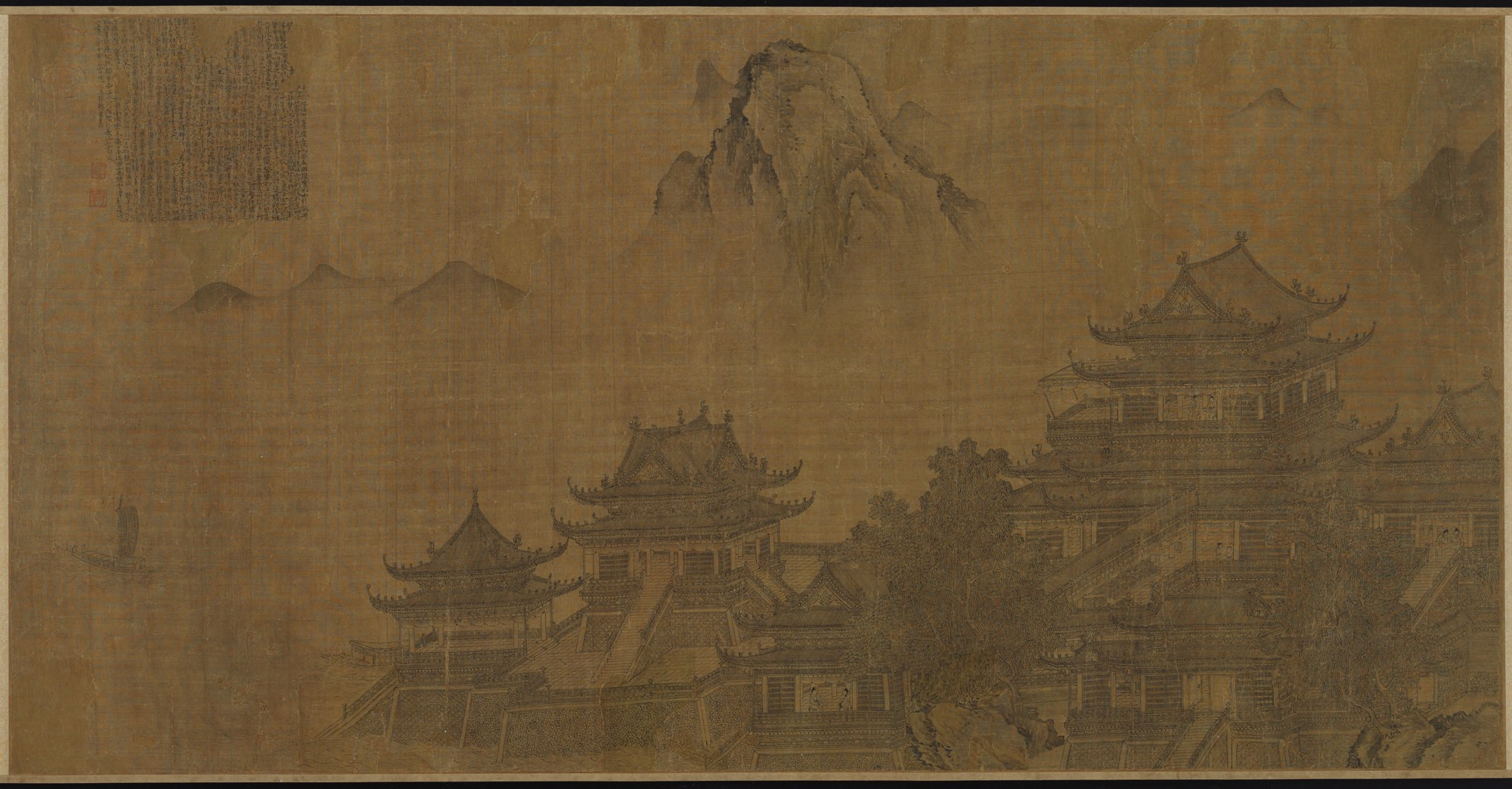
Pavilion of Prince Teng by Wang Zhenpeng, Yuan dynasty

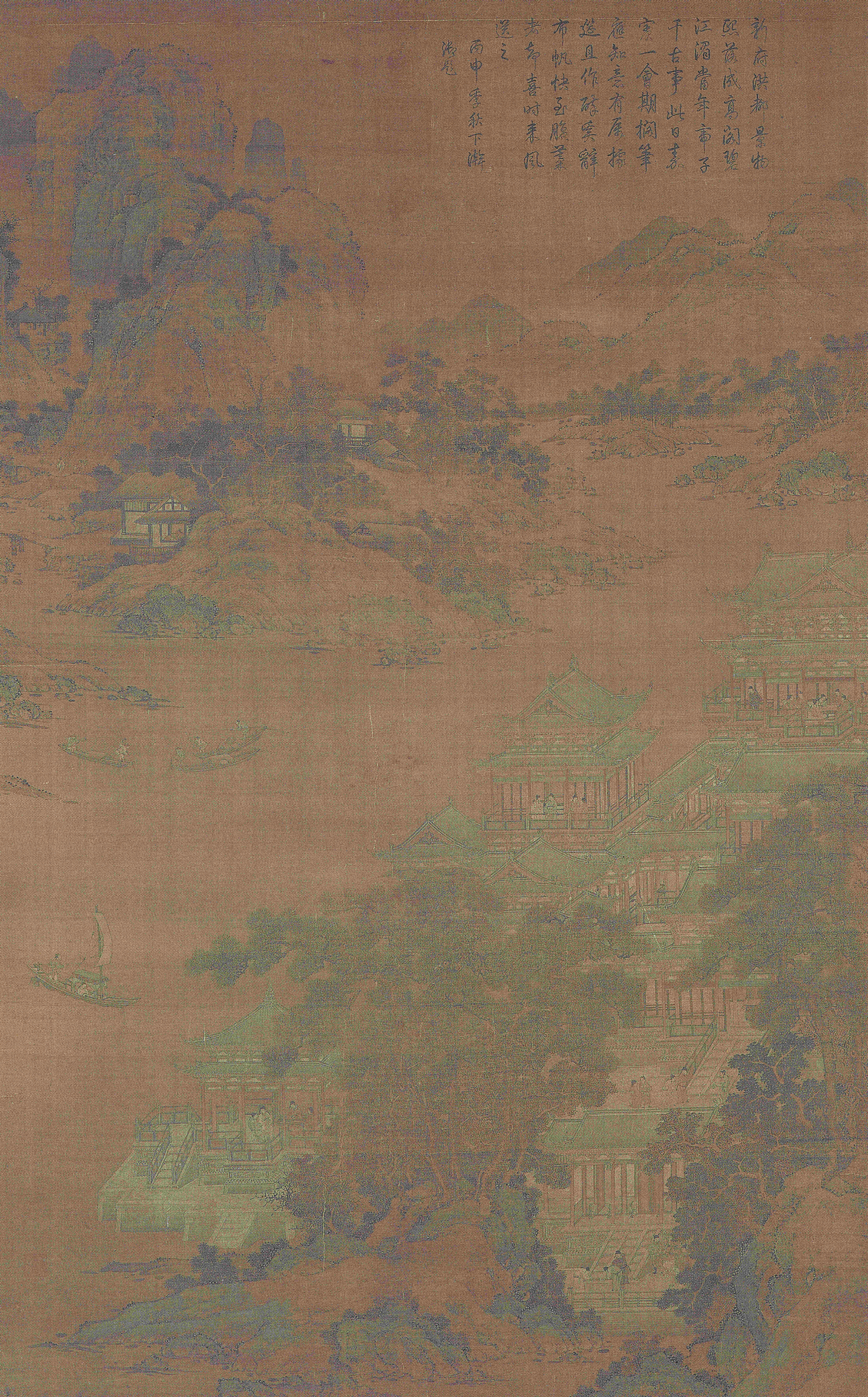
Prince Teng Pavilion by anonymous, Yuan dynasty

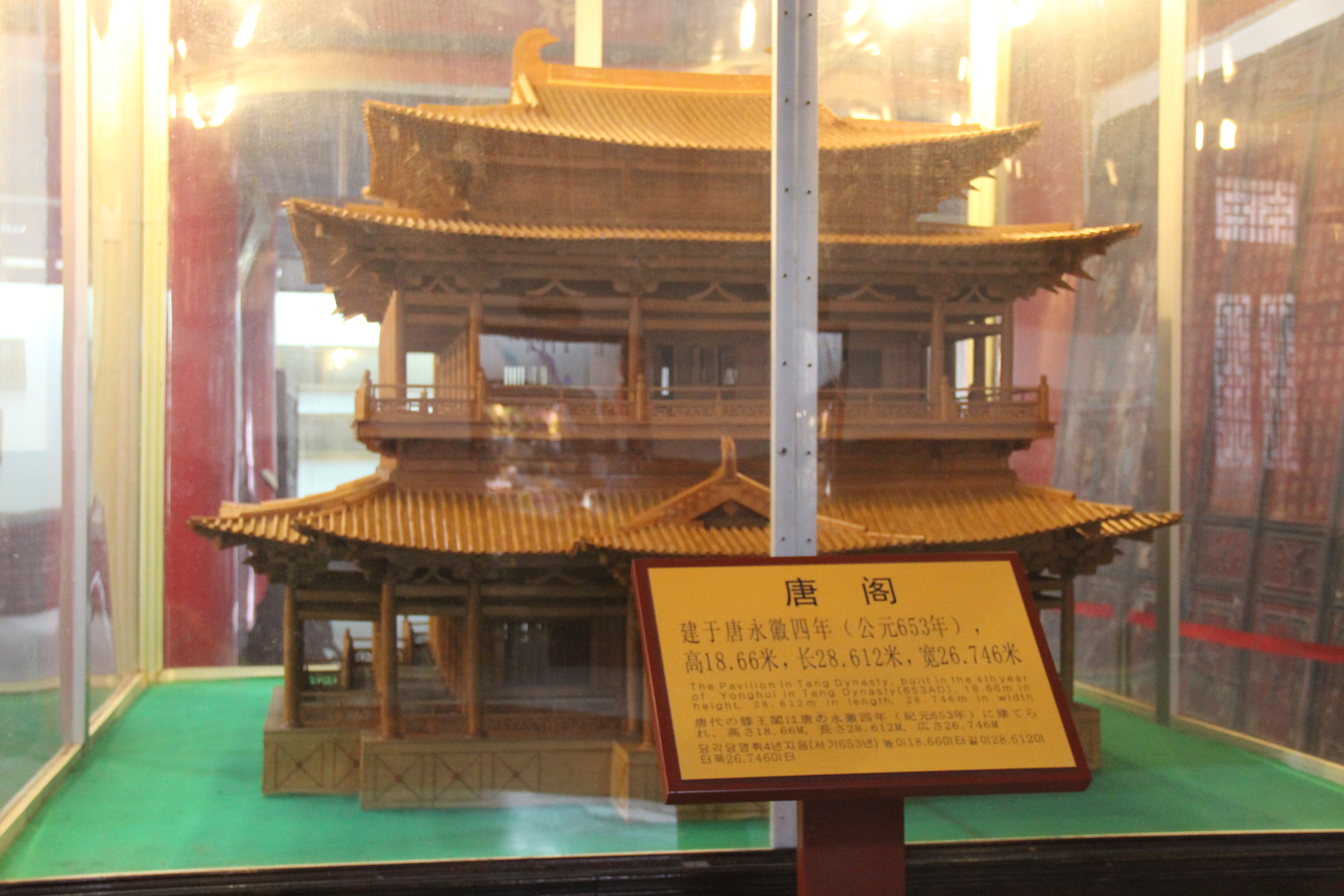
Model of Tang dynasty Prince of Teng Pavilion.

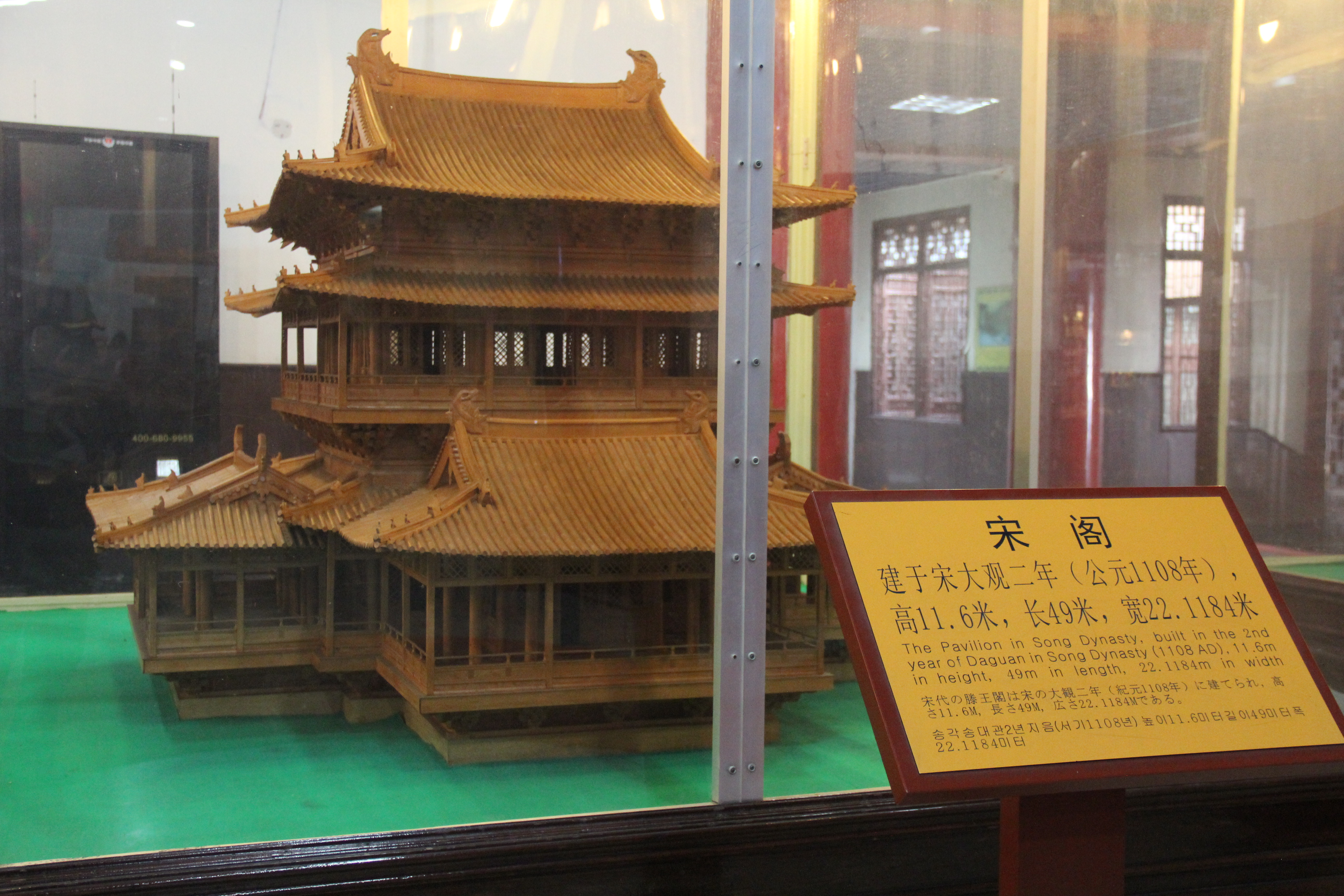
Model of Song dynasty Prince of Teng Pavilion.

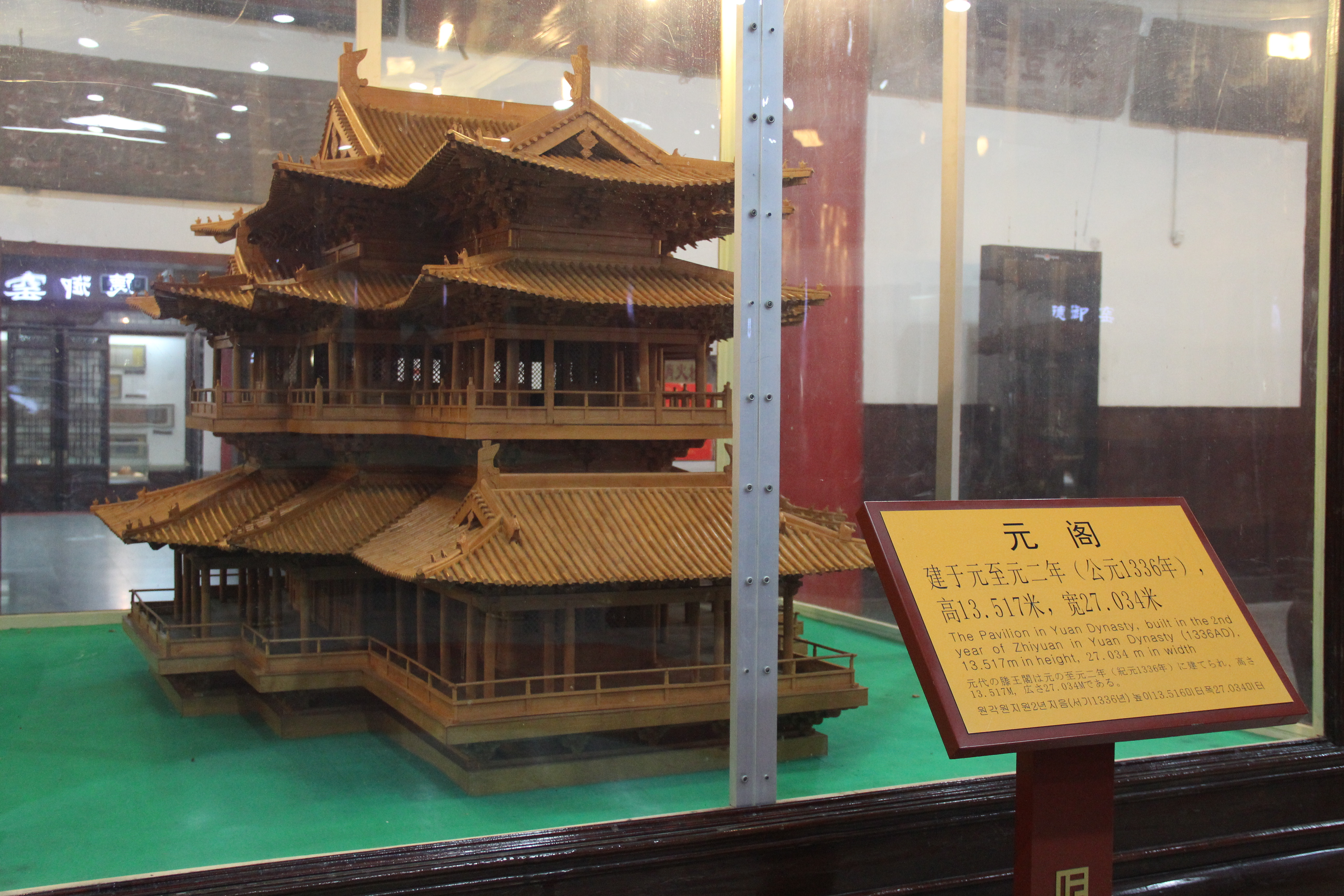
Model of Yuan dynasty Prince of Teng Pavilion.

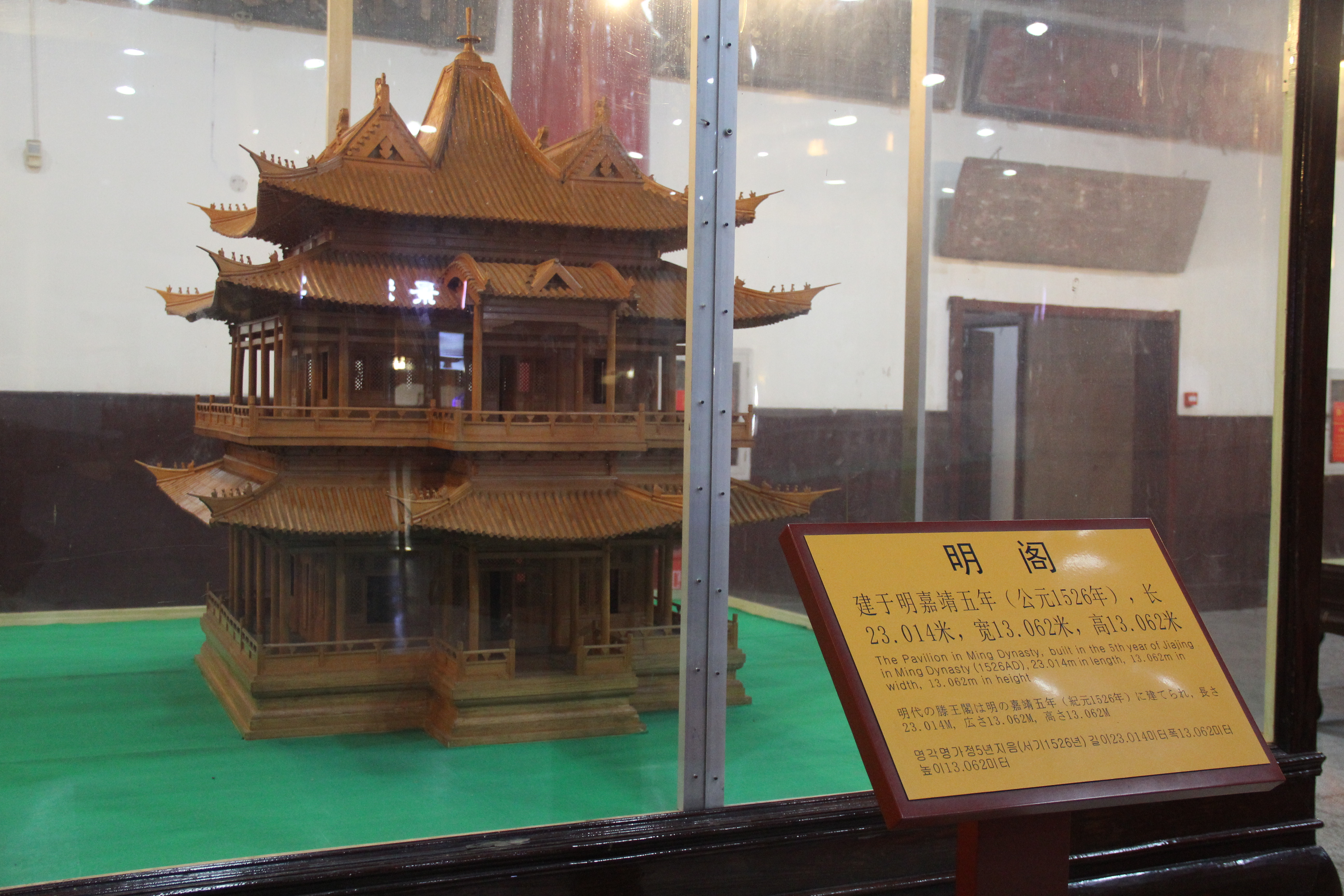
Model of Ming dynasty Prince of Teng Pavilion.

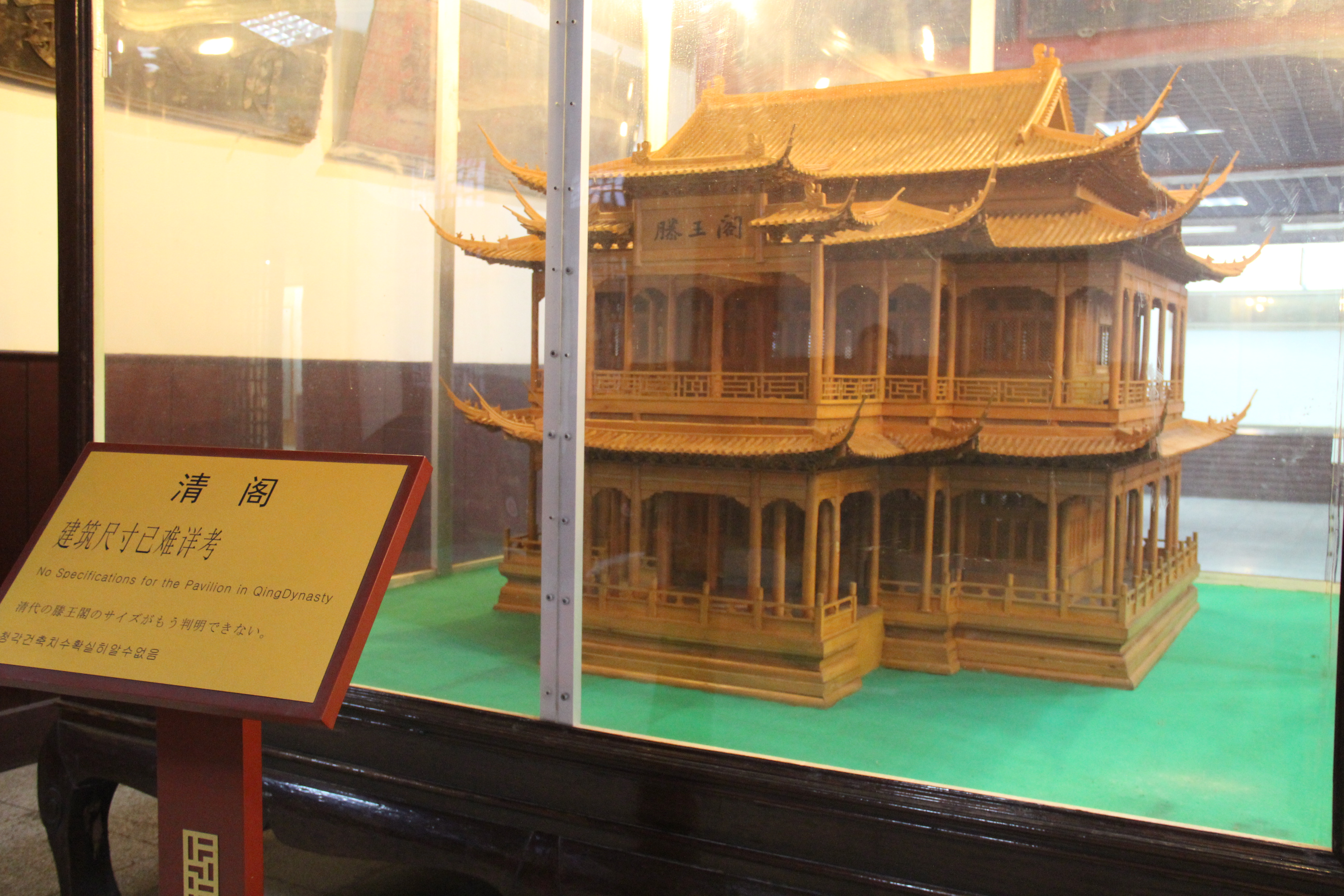
Model of Qing dynasty Prince of Teng Pavilion.

== See also ==
- Four Great Towers of China
- Yellow Crane Tower
- Yueyang Tower
- Penglai Pagoda
